= Die Reihe =

Periodical literature

Die Reihe (German pronunciation: [diː ˈʀaɪ̯ə]) was a German-language music academic journal, edited by Herbert Eimert and Karlheinz Stockhausen and published by Universal Edition (Vienna) between 1955 and 1962 (ISSN 0486-3267). An English edition was published, under the original German title, between 1957 and 1968 by the Theodore Presser Company (Bryn Mawr) in association with Universal Edition (London) (ISSN 0080-0775). A related book series titled "Bücher der Reihe" was begun, but only one title ever appeared in it, Herbert Eimert's Grundlagen der musikalischen Reihentechnik.

== Origin ==
The journal, whose title means "The Row" or "The Series", owes its genesis to the founding of the Studio for Electronic Music of the Nordwestdeutscher Rundfunk (NWDR) in Cologne (later WDR) under the influence of Werner Meyer-Eppler, and the realisation that technology was becoming an important element in the work of younger composers. The contributions from composers working in the studio were frequently based on their projects there, and in the early stages of competing with the radio-play department for resources, Eimert found having such a journal useful. It helped to raise the studio's educational and academic profile above the entertainment aims of other departments of the radio station, as well as providing opportunities to young authors for publication.

== Character and history ==
The subtitle of the original edition, "Information über serielle Musik" ("information on serial music") reflected the intent of the editors, but was changed for the English edition to "A Periodical Devoted to Developments in Contemporary Music", a phrase that did not effectively represent the journal's specific context and may have been one reason for an unfavourable reaction from American composers and critics. There were just eight volumes published, each under a thematic title. Further issues had been planned, but publication was broken off when deteriorating relations between the two editors reached the point of open rupture. In 1958, a competing journal, the Darmstädter Beiträge zur Neuen Musik, was launched by Wolfgang Steinecke, director of the Darmstädter Ferienkurse. When Stockhausen agreed to let Steinecke co-publish an article that Eimert had expected exclusively for Die Reihe, Eimert felt he was being disloyal. When other young composers began following Stockhausen's lead, and Stockhausen himself authorised a short version of another article originally published in Die Reihe, it put increasing pressure on Eimert, who was threatened with a cut in funding by Alfred Schlee of Universal Edition. On the other side, on 24 May 1961 Eimert published in the Kölnische Rundschau a glowing review of Hans Werner Henze's opera Elegy for Young Lovers. Since Henze's style was comparatively old-fashioned, Stockhausen regarded this as a betrayal of the principles of serial music underlying Die Reihe, and vehemently broke with Eimert over it.

== English edition ==
Differences between the German and English editions can be seen from a comparison of their respective tables of contents. Occasionally items were omitted or substituted, but more commonly these involve the order of the articles. In some cases, however, these resulted in a different tone or emphasis, contributing to the problematic reception of Die Reihe in America. For example, the foreword to the first volume (1955) of the German edition declared it to be the mouthpiece for the younger generation, but this foreword was omitted in the 1957 English edition. In addition, the quality of the translations vary considerably. The first volume of the English edition, in particular, "is often content to avoid, rather than understand, the more complex formulations and metaphors in the text".

== Reception ==
Die Reihe became the most important source of information about European serial and electronic music, thanks in part to the appearance of the English edition.

Die Reihe excited considerable controversy, especially after the English editions began appearing in 1957. George Perle and John Backus wrote particularly scornful reviews (Grant points out an example of wilful misquotation in Backus's review,) but even in his relatively factual report on the first volume, Arthur Jacobs could not resist making a joke with reference to the contentiousness surrounding the journal, in connection with a suggestion that the title should also have been translated: "if 'The Row' is open to mispronunciation, 'the Series' would have done". Dika Newlin, reporting on volume five, concludes (apparently with reference to the item in it by John Cage) by saying "Many readers will be disquieted by the periodical's continuing mixture of worthwhile investigation with pretentious phoniness". John Backus especially singled out articles by Eimert, Stockhausen, Henri Pousseur, and Paul Gredinger 1955 in his review of the first four volumes, where he described the extensive use of scientific methodology as inaccurate and pseudo-scientific; the use of jargon disregarded the meanings of scientific terms and made the articles unintelligible; and all the contents lacked any reference to the results of other workers as support for their statements. Werner Meyer-Eppler's article in volume 1 is singled out as the sole exception: "an interesting account of some experimental results in psychoacoustics, [which] is adequately supplied with references, and is a model of lucidity". Backus makes it clear that his concern is exclusively with the use or misuse of scientific terminology: "We shall not concern ourselves with their musical content".(Backus 1962)

One of the most severe critiques was published in the last issue of Die Reihe itself. This was by the Dutch physicist Adriaan Fokker, and was directed primarily at Stockhausen's article "... wie die Zeit vergeht ...". A response defending Stockhausen was published by his colleague, the composer Gottfried Michael Koenig, in the same issue.

Austrian composers Friedrich Cerha and Kurt Schwertsik founded the Ensemble die reihe, dedicated to the performance of Neue Musik, in 1958. American experimental musician Jack Callahan named his recording project in 2014 after this magazine.

== Subject matter ==
Each of the eight issues of Die Reihe was dedicated to a different theme, announced in a subtitle.

=== German edition ===
- Band 1 "Elektronische Musik" (1955)
  - 5: "Gruss an Hanns Hartmann"
  - 7: "Vorwort"
  - 8–13: Herbert Eimert, "Die sieben Stücke"
  - 14–16: Karel Goeyvaerts, "Das elektronische Klangmaterial"
  - 17–19: H. H. Stuckenschmidt, "Die dritte Epoche"
  - 20–21: Giselher Klebe, "Erste praktische Arbeit"
  - 22–28: Werner Meyer-Eppler, "Statistische und psychologische Klangprobleme"
  - 29–30: Gottfried Michael Koenig, "Studiotechnik"
  - 31–33: Ernst Krenek, "Den Jüngeren über die Schulter geschaut"
  - 34–41: Paul Gredinger, "Das Serielle"
  - 42–46: Henri Pousseur, "Strukturen des neuen Baustoffs"
  - 47–56: Pierre Boulez, "An der Grenze des Fruchtlandes"
  - 57–63: Karlheinz Stockhausen, "Aktuelles"
- Band 2 "Anton Webern" (1955)
- (1. Teil) Dokumente—Bekenntisse
  - 7: Igor Stravinsky, "Geleitwort"
  - 8–11: Friedrich Wildgans, "Biografische Tabelle"
  - 12–13: "Verzeichnis der Werke"
  - 14–15: Hildegard Jone, "Eine Kantate"
  - 15: Arnold Schoenberg, "Vorwort zu den Sechs Bagatellen"
  - 16–17: Anton Webern, "Bekenntniss zu Schoenberg"
  - 18: "Der Dirigent Anton Webern"
  - 19: Ernst Krenek, "Der Stein, den die Bauleute verworfen haben, der ist zum Eckstein worden"
  - 20–28: Ernst Krenek, "Aus dem Briefwechsel"
  - 29: Ernst Krenek, "Der UE-Lektor"
  - 30–32: Anton Webern, "Choralis Constantinus"
- (2. Teil) Erkenntnisse—Analysen
  - 35–41: Herbert Eimert, "Die notwendige Korrektur"
  - 42–44: Karlheinz Stockhausen, "Zum 15. September 1955"
  - 45–46: Pierre Boulez, "Für Anton Webern"
  - 47–50: Heinz-Klaus Metzger, "Webern und Schönberg"
  - 51–55: Leopold Spinner, "Eine Analyse (Konzert für 9 Instrumente, 2. Satz)"
  - 56–65: Henri Pousseur, "Weberns organische Chromatik (1. Bagatelle) "
  - 66–68: Christian Wolff, "Kontrollierte Bewegung (Werkauswahl)"
  - 69–79: Karlheinz Stockhausen, "Struktur und Erlebniszeit (Streichquartett, 2. Satz) "
  - 80–84: Heinz-Klaus Metzger, "Analyse des Geistlichen Liedes op. 15 Nr. 4"
  - 85–96: Armin Klammer, "Weberns Variationen für Klavier, 3. Satz"
  - 97–102: Herbert Eimert, "Intervallproportionen (Streichquartett, 1. Satz)"
- Band 3: "Musikalisches Handwerk" (1957)
  - 5–12: Herbert Eimert, "Von der Entscheidungsfreiheit des Komponisten"
  - 13–42: Karlheinz Stockhausen, "...wie die Zeit vergeht... "
  - 43–45: John Cage, "Beschreibung der in Music for Piano 21–52 angewandten Kompositionsmethode"
  - 46–88: Henri Pousseur, "Zur Methodik"
- Band 4: "Junge Komponisten" (1958)
  - 5–8: Wolf-Eberhard von Lewinski, "Junge Komponisten"
  - 9–17: Udo Unger, "Luigi Nono: Polifonica–Monodia–Ritmica, Il canto sospeso"
  - 18–31: Gottfried Michael Koenig, "Henri Pousseur"
  - 32–37: Rudolf Stephan, "Hans Werner Henze"
  - 38–63: György Ligeti, "Pierre Boulez. Entscheidung und Automatik in der Structure 1a"
  - 64–80: Heinz-Klaus Metzger, "Intermezzo I: Das Altern der Philosophie der neuen Musik"
  - 81–84: Herbert Eimert, "Intermezzo II"
  - 85–88: Gottfried Michael Koenig, "Bo Nilsson"
  - 89–97: Wolf-Eberhard von Lewinski, "Giselher Klebe"
  - 98–102: Piero Santi, "Luciano Berio"
  - 103–12: Reinhold Schubert, "Bernd Alois Zimmermann"
  - 113–18: Giacomo Manzoni, "Bruno Maderna"
  - 119–33: Dieter Schnebel, "Karlheinz Stockhausen"
- Band 5: "Berichte—Analyse" (1959)
  - 5–22: Herbert Eimert, "Debussys Jeux"
  - 23–37: Mauricio Kagel, "Ton-Cluster, Anschläge, Übergänge"
  - 38–40: György Ligeti, "Zur III. Klaviersonate von Boulez"
  - 41–49: Heinz-Klaus Metzger, "Gescheiterte Begriffe in Theorie und Kritik der Musik"
  - Karlheinz Stockhausen, "Zwei Vorträge: "
    - 50–59: I "Elektronische und instrumentale Musik"
    - 59–73: II "Musik im Raum"
  - 74–83: Gottfried Michael Koenig, "Studium im Studio"
  - 84: Hans G. Helms, "Zu John Cages Vorlesung 'Unbestimmtheit'")
  - 85–121: John Cage, "Unbestimmtheit" [Übersetzung und räumliche Anordnung, Hans G. Helms]
- Band 6: "Sprache und Musik" (1960)
  - 5–29: Hans Rudolf Zeller, "Mallarmé und das serielle Denken"
  - 30–35: Dieter Schnebel, "Brouillards. Tendenzen bei Debussy"
  - 36–58: Karlheinz Stockhausen, "Musik und Sprache"
  - 59–70: Nicolas Ruwet, "Von den Widersprüchen der seriellen Sprache"
  - 71–87: Henri Pousseur, "Musik, Form und Praxis (Zur Aufhebung einiger Widersprüche)"
- Band 7: "Form—Raum" (1960)
  - 5–17: György Ligeti, "Wandlungen der musikalischen Form"
  - 18–23: Ursula Burghardt-Kagel, "Das Raumtheater von Amancio Williams"
  - 24–30: Christian Wolff "Über Form"
  - 31–61: Mauricio KagelMauricio Kagel, "Translation – Rotation"
  - 62–72: John Whitney, "Bewegungsbilder und elektronische Musik"
  - 73–76: Rainer Fleischhauer, Jörn Janssen, "Hochbau für 200 000 E"
  - 77–86: Jörn Janssen, "Erstes Projekt"
- Band 8: "Rückblicke" (1962)
  - 5–6: Herbert Eimert, "Nachruf auf Werner Meyer-Eppler"
  - 7–10: Werner Meyer-Eppler, "Informationstheoretische Probleme der musikalischen Kommunikation"
  - 11–25: Helmut Kirchmeyer, "Vom historischen Wesen einer rationalistischen Musik"
  - 26–34: Walter Schulze-Andresen "Das dreidimensionale Notenbild"
  - 35–61: Walter O'Conell, "Der Ton-Raum"
  - 62–72: Adriaan D. Fokker, "Wozu und Warum?"
  - 73–92: Gottfried Michael Koenig, "Kommentar"
  - 93–95: "Publikationen der Reihe"

=== English edition ===
- Vol. 1 "Electronic Music" (1957)
  - vi: G. [= Alexander Goehr] "Translator's Preface"
  - 1–10: Herbert Eimert, "What Is Electronic Music?"
  - 11–13: H. H. Stuckenschmidt, "The Third Stage"
  - 14–16: Ernst Krenek, "A Glance over the Shoulders of the Young"
  - 17–18: Giselher Klebe, "First Practical Work"
  - 19–29: Pierre Boulez, "At the Ends of Fruitful Land..."
  - 30–34: Henri Pousseur, "Formal Elements in a New Compositional Material"
  - 35–37: Karel Goeyvaerts, "The Sound Material of Electronic Music"
  - 38–44: Paul Gredinger, "Serial Technique"
  - 45–51: Karlheinz Stockhausen, "Actualia"
  - 52–54: Gottfried Michael Koenig, "Studio Technique"
  - 55–61: Werner Meyer-Eppler, "Statistic and Psychologic Problems of Sound"
- Vol. 2 "Anton Webern" (1958)
- (Part 1) Biographical
  - vii: Igor Stravinsky, "Foreword"
  - 1–4: Friedrich Wildgans, "Biographical Table" [tr. Leo Black]
  - 5–6: "Index of Works"
  - 7–8: Hildegard Jone, "A Cantata" [tr. Eric Smith]
  - 8: Arnold Schoenberg, "Foreword to Webern's Six Bagatelles, Op. 6" [tr. Eric Smith]
  - 9–10: Anton Webern, "Homage to Arnold Schoenberg" [tr. Eric Smith]
  - 11: "Webern as a Conductor" [tr. Eric Smith]
  - 12: Ernst Krenek, "The Same Stone Which the Builders Refused Is Become the Headstone of the Corner" [tr. Eric Smith]
  - 13–21: Ernst Krenek, "From the Correspondence" [tr. Eric Smith]
  - 22: Ernst Krenek, "The UE Reader" [tr. Eric Smith]
  - 23–25: Anton Webern, "Choralis Constantinus" [tr. Leo Black]
- (Part 2) Analytical
  - 29–36: Herbert Eimert, "A Change of Focus" [tr. Leo Black]
  - 37–39: Karlheinz Stockhausen, "For the 15th of September, 1955" [tr. Leo Black]
  - 40–41: Pierre Boulez, "The Threshold" [tr. Leo Black]
  - 42–45: Heinz-Klaus Metzger, "Webern and Schoenberg" [tr. Leo Black]
  - 46–50: Leopold Spinner, "Analysis of a Period" [tr. Leo Black]
  - 51–60: Henri Pousseur, "Anton Webern's Organic Chromaticism" [tr. Leo Black]
  - 61–63: Christian Wolff, "Movement"
  - 64–74: Karlheinz Stockhausen, "Structure and Experiential Time" [tr. Leo Black]
  - 75–80: Heinz-Klaus Metzger, "Analysis of the Sacred Song, op. 15, no. 4" [tr. Leo Black]
  - 81–92: Armin Klammer, "Webern's Piano Variations, op. 27, 3rd Movement" [tr. Leo Black]
  - 93–99: Herbert Eimert, "Interval Proportions" [tr. Leo Black]
- Vol. 3 "Musical Craftmanship"'(1959)
  - 1–9: Herbert Eimert, "The Composer's Freedom of Choice" [tr. Leo Black]
  - 10–40: Karlheinz Stockhausen, "... How Time Passes ... " [tr. Cornelius Cardew]
  - 41–43: John Cage, "To Describe the Process of Composition used in Music for Piano 21–52"
  - 44–88: Henri Pousseur, "Outline of a Method" [tr. Leo Black]
    - 44–47: "Introduction"
    - 48–55: "Quintet in Memory of Webern: (a) Problems and Solutions; (b) Notation; (c) New Problems"
    - 56–63: "Impromptu: (a) Problems and Solutions; (b) Notation"
    - 64–81: "Variations I"
    - 82–88: "Variations II"
- Vol. 4 "Young Composers" (1960) [vol. translated by Leo Black]
  - 1–4: Wolf-Eberhard von Lewinski, "Young Composers"
  - 5–13: Udo Unger, "Luigi Nono"
  - 14–28: Gottfried Michael Koenig, "Henri Pousseur"
  - 29–35: Rudolf Stephan, "Hans Werne Henze"
  - 36–62: György Ligeti, "Pierre Boulez. Decision and Automaticism in Structure 1a"
  - 63–80: Heinz-Klaus Metzger, "Intermezzo I: Just Who Is Growing Old?"
  - 81–84: Intermezzo II [Juxtaposed excerpts from Theodor W. Adorno and Hellmut Kotschenreuther
  - 85–88: Gottfried Michael Koenig, "Bo Nilsson"
  - 89–97: Wolf-Eberhard von Leweinski, "Giselher Klebe"
  - 98–102: Piero Santi, "Luciano Berio"
  - 103–13: Reinhold Schubert, "Bernd Alois Zimmermann"
  - 114–20: Giacomo Manzoni, "Bruno Maderna"
  - 121–34: Dieter Schnebel, "Karlheinz Stockhausen"
  - 135: Wolf-Eberhard von Lewinski, "Conclusion"
- Vol. 5 "Reports—Analyses" (1961)
  - 3–20: Herbert Eimert, "Debussy's 'Jeux'" [tr. Leo Black]
  - 21–29: Heinz-Klaus Metzger, "Abortive Concepts in the Theory and Criticism of Music" [tr. Leo Black]
  - 30–39: Gottfried Michael Koenig, "Studium im Studio" [tr. Leo Black]
  - 40–55: Mauricio Kagel, "Tone, Clusters, Attacks, Transitions" [tr. Leo Black]
  - 56–58: György Ligeti, "Some Remarks on Boulez' 3rd Piano Sonata" [tr. Leo Black]
  - Karlheinz Stockhausen, "Two Lectures":
    - 59–67: I "Electronic and Instrumental Music" [tr. Ruth Koenig]
    - 67–82: II "Music in Space" [tr. Ruth Koenig]
  - 83: Hans G. Helms, "John Cage's Lecture 'Indeterminacy'" [tr. Leo Black]
  - 84–120: John Cage, "Lecture"
- Vol. 6 "Speech and Music" (1964)
  - 5–32: Hans Rudolf Zeller, "Mallarmé and Serialist Thought" [tr. Margaret Shenfield]
  - 33–39: Dieter Schnebel, "Brouillards. Tendencies in Debussy" [tr. Margaret Shenfield]
  - 40–64: Karlheinz Stockhausen, "Music and Speech" [tr. Ruth Koenig]
  - 65–76: Nicolas Ruwet, "Contradictions within the Serial Language" [tr. Margaret Shenfield]
  - 77–93: Henri Pousseur, "Music, Form and Practice (An Attempt to Reconcile Some Contradictions)" [tr. Margaret Shenfield]
- Vol. 7 "Form—Space" (1964)
  - 5–19: György Ligeti, "Metamorphoses of Musical Form" (tr. Cornelius Cardew)
  - 20–25: Ursula Burghardt-Kagel, "Amancio Williams' Space Theatre" [tr. Cornelius Cardew]
  - 26–31: Christian Wolff, "On Form"
  - 32–60: Mauricio Kagel, "Translation-Rotation" [tr. Cornelius Cardew]
  - 61–71: John Whitney, "Moving Pictures and Electronic Music" [tr. Cornelius Cardew]
  - 72–75: Rainer Fleischhauer, Jörn Janssen, "Project for 200,000 Inhabitants" [tr. Cornelius Cardew]
  - 76–85: Jörn Janssen, "Initial Project: Designed for Gottfried Michael Koenig" [tr. Cornelius Cardew]
- Vol. 8 "Retrospective" (1968)
  - 5–6: Herbert Eimert, "Werner Meyer-Eppler"
  - 7–10: Werner Meyer-Eppler, "Musical Communication as a Problem of Information Theory"
  - 11–24: Helmut Kirchmeyer, "On the Historical Constitution of a Rationalistic Music"
  - 25–34: Walter Schulze-Andresen, "The Three-Dimensional Music Stave"
  - 35–67: Walter O'Connell, "Tone Spaces"
  - 68–79: Andriaan D. Fokker, "Wherefore, and Why?"
  - 80–98: Gottfried Michael Koenig, "Commentary"
