= Hans G. Helms =

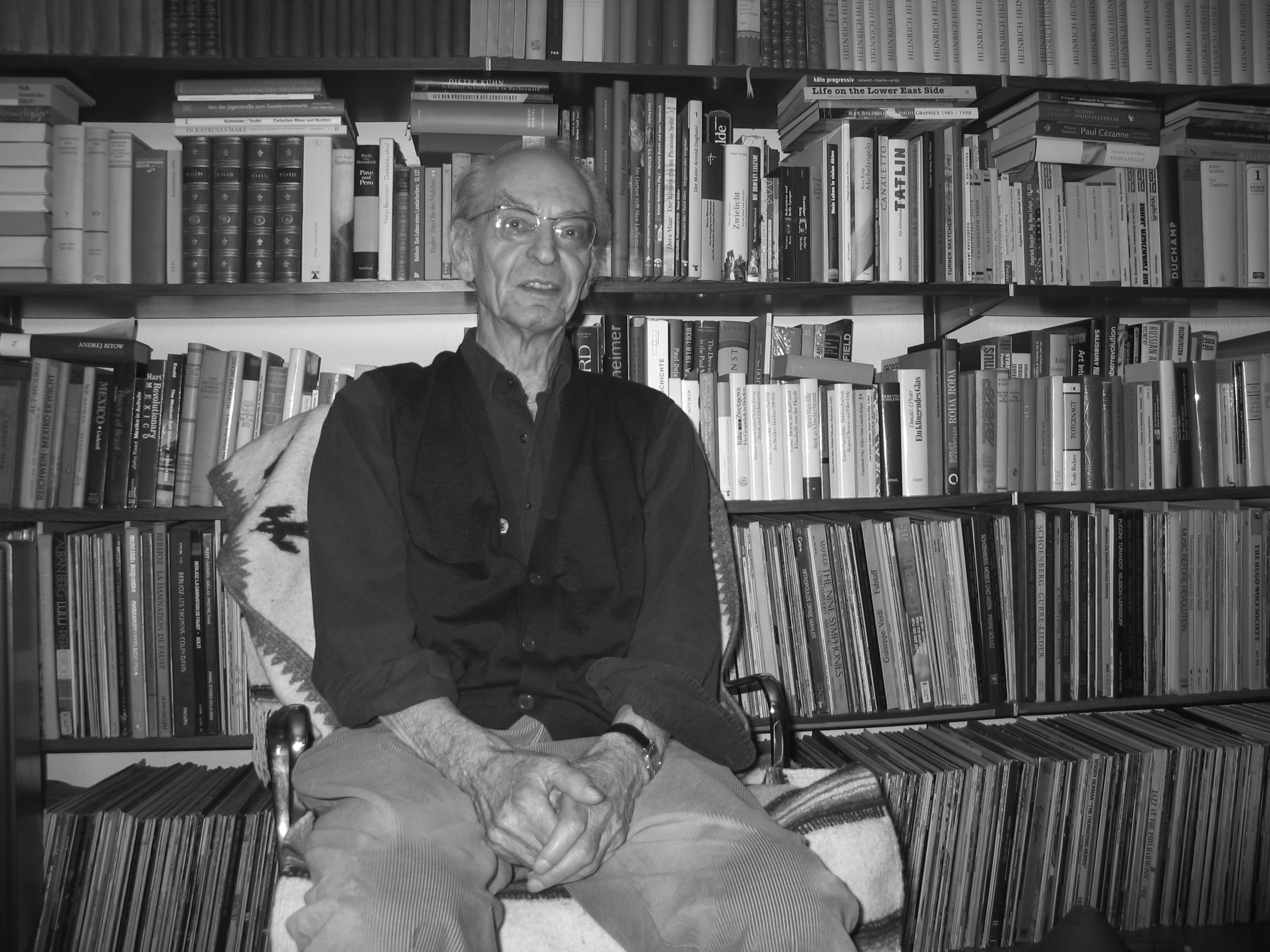
Hans G. Helms (2009)

Hans G Helms (8 June 1932 – 11 March 2012) was a German experimental writer, composer, and social and economic analyst and critic.

== Life ==
Helms was born in Teterow into a Jewish family, who were able to escape the Holocaust by using falsified papers. He spent his childhood and youth in Teterow and Berlin. He received his first musical education whilst young, learning the piano and theory from an immigrant from Byelorussia. During the Nazi era he became acquainted with Swing and jazz from secretly listening to "enemy transmitters".

In the years immediately after World War II, Helms studied tenor saxophone with a member of the US army and appeared from 1950 until 1952 in Sweden as a jazz musician. He played with, amongst others, Charlie Parker and Gene Krupa, and also in 1953 in Vienna with Hans Koller. As well as being preoccupied with new music (Charles Ives, Henry Cowell, Alban Berg and the Second Viennese School) Helms, working at the Viennese radio station Rot-Weiß-Rot (RWR), created with, amongst others, Ingeborg Bachmann, the radio genre Jazz & Lyrik.

In Göttingen, where he lived from 1953 onwards, Helms first made the acquaintance of the philosopher and sociologist Helmuth Plessner, then later with Theodor W. Adorno. His social and cultural critiques were significantly influenced by the Frankfurt School and critical theory. He also studied comparative linguistics with Roman Jakobson and philosophy and social theory with Max Horkheimer and Siegfried Kracauer; however, Helms describes the Marxist economist Jürgen Kuczynski as his most important teacher.

In 1955, the self-taught Helms began to compose. From 1957 onwards he made his base in Cologne, where he worked together with the composer Gottfried Michael Koenig at the buildings of the Studio for Electronic Music at Westdeutscher Rundfunk (WDR). He directed phonetic experiments together with the physicist and communications researcher Werner Meyer-Eppler, who also advised Herbert Eimert and Karlheinz Stockhausen at the same time. This work consisted of speech and sound analyses as well as linguistic and cybernetic studies.

Helms made contacts with Stockhausen, Pierre Boulez and John Cage through the Donaueschingen Festival and the Darmstädter Ferienkurse (where Helms visited and sometimes lectured from 1957 to 1970); he was especially drawn to Cage's music using radio broadcasts and writings. In Helms' abode a circle was formed, which included, as well as Koenig, also Mauricio Kagel and the musicicologist Heinz-Klaus Metzger; a central preoccupation was James Joyce's Finnegans Wake. From this influence, Helms developed two 'language-music compositions' (Sprach-Musik-Kompositionen), Fa:m Ahniesgwow and daidalos; later, in collaboration with Hans Otte, came GOLEM and KONSTRUKTIONEN. His Text for Bruno Maderna (1959), a work consisting entirely of phonemes, was used by Maderna in his stagework Hyperion (1964). Helms would apply principles to language which derived from musical techniques of serialism, organising phonemes and morphemes to create new linguistic constructions in such a manner. This work paralleled that of other contemporaries of the time, in particular Dieter Schnebel.

During the 1960s, when Helms became a private pupil of Adorno, he studied the critical theory of the Frankfurt School and its roots in Marxism. Thereby he discovered Max Stirner, whose work Der Einzige und sein Eigentum (The Ego and Its Own) had provoked a violent critique from Marx, which led in consequence to his basic concept of historical materialism. Helms worked for many years upon this work of Stirner and its reception, producing his literary magnum opus, the 600-page Die Ideologie der anonymen Gesellschaft in 1966.

Helms saw himself, with his critique of Stirner, in the tradition from both Marx and some contemporary Marxists, who had already recognised 'the suppurative focus' and Stirner's 'current danger'. In his work, Helms presented the view that Stirner created 'the first consistent formulation ... of the ideology of the middle class' and further that Hitler articulated a specifically middle-class ideology and that Stirner-ism and National Socialism are both variations upon the same fascist demons. "Because this demon lives on in West Germany, controlled by the middle classes, he has written this book to fight it."

Afterwards he stopped composing in order to concentrate on producing music broadcasts and films (including works on Ives, Boulez and Stockhausen), believing radio and television as the more effective media for presenting social critique. He concluded his studies in sociology with a doctorate at the University of Bremen in 1974; as well as travelling to European and North African countries, he held a Guest Professorship between 1976 and 1978 at the University of Illinois. In 1978, he moved to the United States, and from 1982 lived in New York City.

Here Helms investigated the effects of the computer and telecommunications development on the field of employment, engaging in critiques of capitalism and globalization, as well as the social consequences of modern town planning. He predominantly made use of field research and interviews. He published his findings in political and scientific, music and literary magazines, trade union journals, and daily papers; and compiled radio and television productions for several ARD broadcasting corporations.

In 1988, Helms returned to Germany, first living in Cologne; in 2003 he moved to Berlin. He adds to his studies work on the history of the Jews in Eastern Europe, as well as, separately, looking critically at the conditions of work of contemporary composers who use electronics and computers.

== Works ==
=== Music ===
- Fa:m' Ahniesgwow. Experimental literature/speech-composition/radio play, DuMont-Schauberg, Cologne 1959/60
- Text for Bruno Maderna. Rendering and incorporation from Bruno Maderna in his Dimensione II und Hyperion. Cologne 1959, Milan 1959, 1964 ff.
- daidalos. Composition in seven scenes for four vocal soloists, instrumental ensemble, and conductor. With Hans Otte 1961
- Yahud-Geschichten. Reading and listening pieces. 1961–65 (unfinished)
- GOLEM. Polemic for nine singers. 1962
- KONSTRUKTIONEN über das Kommunistische Manifest für 16 Sänger (on The Communist Manifesto for sixteen singers). 1968
- Birdcage – 73'20.958" for a Composer. Film composition. With John Cage. 1972
- Fa:m' Ahniesgwow. Radio version (excerpts). Radio Westdeutscher Rundfunk Cologne 1979
- Hieronymus-John von Münchhausen: Fabulierer, Adventurer, Erfinder Neuer Klangwelten. In: Jahresring 40: Mythologie der Aufklärung – Geheimlehren der Moderne. (ed. Beat Wyss). Verlag Silke Schreiber, Munich 1993
- Rapprochements à John Cage. A radio composition with an integration of Music of Changes of John Cage. Cologne and Baden-Baden 1995–96. – Verbal score in Protokolle 1–2/1997

=== Writings (selected) ===
- "Marihuana". In: Jazz-Podium, vol. III, nos. 6 and 8, June and August 1954
- "Zu John Cages Vorlesung 'Unbestimmtheit'". In: Die Reihe V, 1959
- "Über die gesellschaftliche Funktion der Kritik". In: Kritik – von wem/für wen/wie, Munich 1959
- Die Ideologie der anonymen Gesellschaft: Max Stirners "Einziger" und der Fortschritt des demokratischen Selbstbewußtseins vom Vormärz bis zur Bundesrepublik. DuMont Schauberg, Cologne 1966
- Fetisch Revolution. Marxismus und Bundesrepublik. Sammlung Luchterhand, Neuwied 1969
- "Vom Proletkult zum Bio-Interview". In: Literatur als Praxis? Aktualität und Tradition operativen Schreibens. (eds. Raoul Hübner, Erhard Schütz). Lesen 4. Westdeutscher Verlag, Opladen 1976.
- Textverarbeitungssysteme. Neue Computertechnologien – Arbeitsplatzkiller oder technischer Fortschritt. (ed. HBV-Hauptvorstand). Arbeitsmaterial zur Tarifpolitik. HBV, Düsseldorf 1978
- Auf dem Weg zum Schrottplatz. Zum Städtebau in den USA und in Canada. Pahl-Rugenstein, Cologne 1984
- Künstliche Intelligenz. Eine Studie ihrer historischen Entwicklung, ihrer Triebkräfte und ihrer sozio- und politökonomischen Implikationen. author's edition, New York 1985.
- "Detroit – Motor City mit Motown Sound. Eine Metropole unter dem Diktat der Automobilkonzerne". In: Die Zukunft der Städte und der Regionen. (ed. IMSF) Arbeitsmaterialien des IMSF 21. IMSF, Frankfurt/Main 1988
- " Electronic Battlefields' oder 'Die Einübung des imitativen Gehorsams'". In: Imitationen – Nachahmung und Modell: Von der Lust am Falschen. (eds. Jörg Huber, Martin Heller, Hans Ulrich Reck). Stroemfeld/Roter Stern, Basel, Frankfurt/Main 1989
- "Manhattans neue Kapitalfabriken. Zu den technologischen Ursachen und baulichen Konsequenzen der Konzentration des Weltfinanzkapitals in New York". In: Die Janusgesichter des Booms. (eds. Ulrich Becker, Annalie Schoen). VSA, Hamburg 1989
- "Ford und die Nazis". In: Zwangsarbeit bei Ford. Dokumentation. (ed. Projektgruppe "Messelager" im Verein EL-DE-Haus e.V. Cologne). Rode-Stankowski, Cologne 1996
- "Plüsch und deutsches Mittelgebirge. Zu den Schriften Siegfried Kracauers". In Siegfried Kracauer. Zum Werk des Romanciers, Feuilletonisten, Architekten, Filmwissenschaftlers und Soziologen. (ed. Andreas Volk). Seismo, Zürich 1996
- "Zur Ästhetik des Widerstands. Anknüpfungen an Werner Mittenzwei. Eine historische Mär von den Zwisten und Kümmernissen konservativer Literaten. / 'Und so ein Mann wollte ich eigentlich werden' oder 'Das Geheimnis des Theaters'". In Dialog mit Werner Mittenzwei. Beiträge und Materialien zu einer Kulturgeschichte der DDR. (ed. Simone Barck, Inge Münz-Koenen, Gabriele Gast). trafo, Berlin 2002
- Musik zwischen Geschäft und Unwahrheit (Musik-Konzepte, vol. 111, eds. Heinz-Klaus Metzger and Rainer Riehn). Text+Kritik, Munich 2001
- "Zu Albert Speers Bürokratie der systematischen Verelendung und Deportation der Berliner Juden". In: Zeitschrift Marxistische Erneuerung. Z. 51, 2002
- "Zu Kompromissen nicht bereit. Erlebnisse und Erfahrungen mit Franco Evangelisti." In: Hin zu einer neuen Welt. Notate zu Franco Evangelisti.. (ed. Harald Muenz) Pfau, Saarbrücken 2002
- Oświęcim – Oshpitsin – Auschwitz. Zentrum jüdischen Lebens, Stätte des Massenmords. Chronik einer polnischen Stadt. Verlag 8. Mai, Berlin 2007
- Editor and co-author of the following volumes:
  - Max Stirner: Der Einzige und sein Eigentum und andere Schriften. Hanser, Munich 1968
  - Kapitalistischer Städtebau. (with Joern Janssen). Luchterhand, Neuwied 1970
  - Petr Kropotkin: Die Eroberung des Brotes und andere Schriften. Hanser, Munich 1973
  - Die Stadt als Gabentisch: Beobachtungen der aktuellen Städtebauentwicklung. Reclam, Leipzig 1992, ISBN 3-379-00732-3

=== Discography ===
- Fa:m' Ahniesgwow. Experimental speech-music-composition/radio play. Integral recording (Ensemble sprechbohrer: Sigrid Sachse, Harald Muenz, Georg Sachse). WERGO/HR, Mainz 2011. Preis der deutschen Schallplattenkritik, Vierteljahresliste 3/2011, Top 10 Picks 2011 The Wire, London.
