= Aleatoricism =

Art works resulting from actions by chance

Aleatoricism (or aleatorism) is a term for musical compositions and other forms of art resulting from "actions made by chance".

The term was first used "in the context of electro-acoustics and information theory" to describe "a course of sound events that is determined in its framework and flexible in detail", by Belgian-German physicist, acoustician, and information theorist Werner Meyer-Eppler. In practical application, in compositions by Mozart and Kirnberger, for instance, the order of the measures of a musical piece were left to be determined by throwing dice, and in performances of music by Pousseur (e.g., Répons pour sept musiciens, 1960), musicians threw dice "for sheets of music and cues". However, more generally in musical contexts, the term has had varying meanings as it was applied by various composers, and so a single, clear definition for aleatory music is defied. The term was popularised by the musical composer Pierre Boulez, but also Witold Lutosławski and Franco Evangelisti.

Its etymology derives from alea, Latin for "dice", and it is the noun associated with the adjectival aleatory and aleatoric.

Aleatory should not be confused with either indeterminacy, or improvisation.

== In different fields ==
=== Architecture ===
Sean Keller and Heinrich Jaeger coined the term aleatory architecture to describe "a new approach that explicitly includes stochastic (re-) configuration of individual structural elements — that is to say 'chance.'"

=== Literature ===
Charles Hartman discusses several methods of automatic generation of poetry in his book The Virtual Muse.

=== Music ===
The term aleatory was coined by Werner Meyer-Eppler in 1955 to describe a course of sound events that is "determined in general but depends on chance in detail". When his article was published in English, the translator mistakenly rendered his German noun Aleatorik as an adjective, and so inadvertently created a new English word, "aleatoric". Pierre Boulez applied the term "aleatory" in this sense to his own pieces to distinguish them from the indeterminate music of John Cage. While Boulez purposefully composed his pieces to allow the performer certain liberties with regard to the sequencing and repetition of parts, Cage often composed through the application of chance operations without allowing the performer liberties.

Another composer of aleatory music was the German composer Karlheinz Stockhausen, who had attended Meyer-Eppler's seminars in phonetics, acoustics, and information theory at the University of Bonn from 1954 to 1956, and put these ideas into practice for the first time in his electronic composition Gesang der Jünglinge (1955–56), in the form of statistically structured, massed "complexes" of sounds.

Aleatoric techniques are sometimes used in contemporary film music, e.g., in John Williams's film scores and Mark Snow's music for X-Files: Fight the Future.

== See also ==
- 20th-century classical music
- 21st-century classical music
- Aesthetics
- Aleatory variable
- Avant-garde
- Biomusic
- Biomusicology
- Constrained writing
- Contemporary classical music
- Generative art
- New-age music
- Philosophy of film
- Philosophy and literature
- Philosophy of music
- Stochastic
- Zoomusicology
