= Herbert Eimert =

German musicologist and composer (1897–1972)

Herbert Eimert (8 April 1897 – 15 December 1972) was a German music theorist, musicologist, journalist, music critic, editor, radio producer, and composer.

== Education ==
Herbert Eimert was born in Bad Kreuznach. He studied music theory and composition from 1919 to 1924 at the Cologne Musikhochschule with Hermann Abendroth, Franz Bölsche, and August von Othegraven. In 1924, while still a student, he published an Atonale Musiklehre (Atonal Music Theory Text) which, together with a twelve-tone string quartet composed for the end-of-term examination concert, led to an altercation with Bölsche, who withdrew the quartet from the program and expelled Eimert from his composition class.

In 1924, he began studies in musicology at the University of Cologne with Ernst Bücken, Willi Kahl, and Georg Kinsky, and read philosophy with Max Scheler (a pupil of Husserl) and Nicolai Hartmann. He attained his doctorate in 1931 with a dissertation titled Musikalische Formstrukturen im 17. und 18. Jahrhundert. Versuch einer Formbeschreibung (Musical Form Structures in the 17th and 18th Century. Attempt at a Description of Form).

== Career ==
From 1927 until 1933 he was employed at the Cologne Radio and wrote for music magazines such as Melos and the Neue Zeitschrift für Musik. In 1930 he became a music critic for the Kölner Stadt-Anzeiger, and from 1935 until 1945 worked as an editor at the Kölnische Zeitung.

In 1945, he became the first salaried staff member of the Cologne Radio (NWDR), administered by the British occupation forces. In 1947, he took over the NWDR Department of Cultural Reporting, and, in 1948, initiated the Musikalische Nachtprogramme (late-night music programs), which he directed until 1965. In 1951, Eimert and Werner Meyer-Eppler persuaded the director of NWDR, Hanns Hartmann, to create a Studio for Electronic Music, which Eimert directed until 1962. This became the most influential studio in the world during the 1950s and 1960s, with composers such as Michael von Biel, Konrad Boehmer, Herbert Brün, Jean-Claude Éloy, Péter Eötvös, Franco Evangelisti, Luc Ferrari, Johannes Fritsch, Rolf Gehlhaar, Karel Goeyvaerts, Hermann Heiss, York Höller, Maki Ishii, David C. Johnson, Mauricio Kagel, Gottfried Michael Koenig, Petr Kotik, Włodzimierz Kotoński, Ernst Krenek, Ladislav Kupkovič, György Ligeti, Mesías Maiguashca, Bo Nilsson, Henri Pousseur, Roger Smalley, Karlheinz Stockhausen (who succeeded Eimert as director), Dimitri Terzakis, Iannis Xenakis, and Bernd Alois Zimmermann working there. Cornelius Cardew also worked there in 1958. The last composer invited by Eimert to work in the Studio was Konrad Boehmer, recruited in 1959 when he was still a "school boy."

In 1950, he published the Lehrbuch zur Zwölftonmusik, which became one of the best-known introductory texts on Schoenbergian twelve-tone technique, and was translated into Italian, Spanish, and Hungarian. From 1955 until 1962 he edited in conjunction with Karlheinz Stockhausen the influential journal Die Reihe. His book Grundlagen der musikalischen Reihentechnik appeared in 1964. From 1951 until 1957 he lectured at the Darmstadt International Vacation Courses for New Music. In 1965 he became professor at the Hochschule für Musik in Cologne and directed their Studio for Electronic Music until 1971. Together with Hans Ulrich Humpert, his successor at the electronic studio of the Musikhochschule, he worked on the Lexikon der elektronischen Musik (Dictionary of Electronic Music). Just short of completing the manuscript, Eimert died on 15 December 1972, either in Düsseldorf or Cologne.

Among Eimert's notable students was Clarence Barlow.

== Compositions (selective list) ==
- String Quartet (1923–25)
- Der weiße Schwan for saxophon, flute, and specially made noise instruments (1926)
- Kammerkonzert for five instruments (1926)
- Suite for chamber orchestra (1929)
- Musik für Violine und Violoncello (1931)
- Second String Quartet (1939)
- Variations for piano (1943)
- Trio for violin, viola, and cello (1944)
- Bläsermusik (1947)
- Four Pieces (jointly composed with Robert Beyer) (1953)
- Struktur 8, electronic music (1953)
- Glockenspiel, electronic music (1953)
- Etüde über Tongemische, electronic music (1954)
- Five Pieces, electronic music (1956)
- Zu Ehren von Igor Strawinsky (1957)
- Selektion I (1960)
- Epitaph für Aikichi Kuboyama, for speaker and electronically transformed speech sounds (1962)
- Six Studies, electronic music (1962)

== Principal writings ==
- 1924. Atonale Musiklehre. Leipzig: Verlag von Breitkopf & Härtel.
- 1932. Musikalische Formstrukturen im 17. und 18. Jahrhundert; Versuch einer Formbeschreibung. Augsburg: B. Filser.
- 1950. Lehrbuch der Zwöfltontechnik. Wiesbaden: Breitkopf & Härtel.
- 1955a. "Die sieben Stücke" Die Reihe 1: "Elektronische Musik": 8–13 [not included in the English edition].
- 1955b. "Die notwendige Korrektur" Die Reihe 2: "Anton Webern": 35–41 [English edition 1958, as "A Change of Focus", pp. 29–36].
- 1955c. "Intervallproportionen (Streichquartett, 1. Satz)." Die Reihe 2: "Anton Webern": 97–102 [English edition 1958, as "Interval Proportions", pp. 93–99].
- 1957a. "Von der Entscheidungsfreiheit des Komponisten." Die Reihe 3: "Musikalische Handwerk": 5–12 [English edition 1959, as "The Composer's Freedom of Choice," pp. 1–9].
- 1957b. "Debussys Jeux." Die Reihe 5: "Berichte—Analyse": 5–22 [English edition 1961, as "Debussy's Jeux," pp. 3–20].
- 1957c. "What is Electronic Music?" Die Reihe 1: "Electronic Music" (English edition only): 1–10.
- 1958. "Intermezzo II." Die Reihe 4: "Junge Komponisten": 81–84 [English edition 1960, pp. 81–84].
- 1962. "Nachruf auf Werner Meyer-Eppler." Die Reihe 8: "Rückblicke": 5–6 [English ed. 1968, as "Werner Meyer-Eppler," pp. 5–6].
- 1964. Grundlagen der musikalischen Reihentechnik. Bücher der Reihe. Vienna: Universal Edition.
- 1972. "So begann die elektronische Musik." Melos 39, no. 1 (January/February): 42–44. [Translated into English as "How Electronic Music Began," The Musical Times 113, no. 1550 (April 1972): 347–49.]
- 1973. Lexikon der elektronischen Musik (with Hans Ulrich Humpert). Regensburg: Bosse.
