= Paul Gredinger =

Swiss architect

- Born: July 27, 1927
- Died: October 6, 2013 (aged 86); Thalwil
- Occupations: Architect, advertiser, painter

Paul Gredinger (27 July 1927 – 6 October 2013) was a Swiss architect and one of the leading figures in the German advertising scene. Between 1953 and 1957, he worked together with Karlheinz Stockhausen and Herbert Eimert at the Studio for Electronic Music. He also painted in a Cubist style.

== Career ==
At the end of the 1950s, he met the advertisers Karl Gerstner and Markus Kutter and became their partner in 1962. The agency then traded as Gerstner, Gredinger, Kutter, or GGK. After Gerstner and Kutter retired in 1975, Gredinger took over their shares and expanded the agency into a European network with up to 20 branches. In the 1970s and 1980s, Gredinger's company was regarded as a first address for top creative professionals. Gredinger himself was the protagonist of one of the first colour ad campaigns I drink Jägermeister because... by Jägermeister.

Gredinger supported his artist friends such as Dieter Roth, André Thomkins and Donald Judd. In 1990, he sold his shares to the Swiss Trimedia. Gredinger was elected honorary member for Germany by the Art Directors Club of New York in 1992.

Gredinger was brought to ETH Zurich in 1999 by the then guest lecturer, Valerio Olgiati, as a fictitious client, for whom one of the residential buildings was designed by Raphael Zuber.

== Personal life ==
Between 1953 and 1957, Gredinger collaborated with Karlheinz Stockhausen and Herbert Eimert at the Studio for Electronic Music in Cologne.

Gredinger died in Thalwil at the age of 86.

== Literature ==
- Heinz Wirz (ed.): 14 student projects with Valerio Olgiati. 1998-2000. Quart Verlag, Lucerne 2000, ISBN 3-907631-04-8. Design: Raphael Zuber
