= List of compositions by Jean-Claude Éloy =

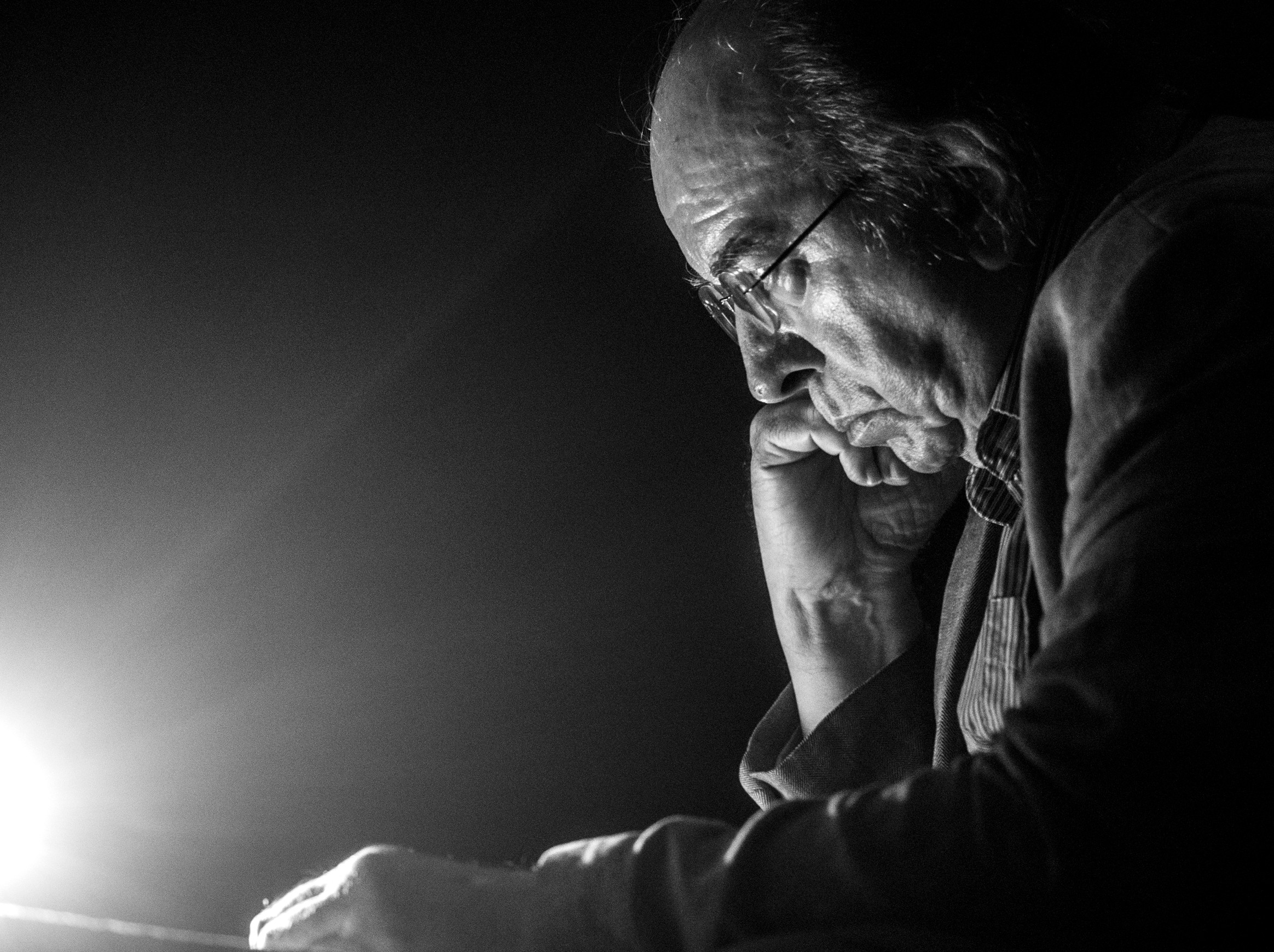
Jean-Claude Éloy in 2015

This is a complete list of compositions by Jean-Claude Éloy, arranged in chronological order.

== Early works (unpublished) ==
- Nocturne, for piano (1954)
- Le bois amical, for soprano and piano; text by Paul Valéry (1954)
- Féerie, for soprano and piano; text by Paul Valery (1954)
- Après une lecture d’André Breton, for piano, ondes Martenot, harp, glockenspiel (or celesta), vibraphone, xylophone, crotales (antique cymbals), percussion, (1954); unfinished
- Chant de Vitrail, for mixed chorus and orchestra, (1955); unfinished
- Vitrail multicolore, for piano (1955)
- Sur la nappe d'un étang glacé, for soprano, vibraphone and marimba; text by René Char (1957)
- Claire comme le jour, for soprano and piano; texts by Claude Roy (1959)
1. Le poseur de questions
2. Belle à couper le souffle
3. Absence
4. Claire
5. Le ciel et l’enfer
6. Claire au loin
7. Petit matin
- Encore une aube, for soprano and piano; texts by Jean-Claude Eloy (1959)
- Deux poèmes, for soprano and piano; texts by Jacques Prévert and Robert Desnos (1959)
1. Automne
2. Le dernier poème
- Pièce pour piano (1959)
- Robaïa n° 104 de Omar Khayyam, for soprano and ondes Martenot (1959)
- L'Herbe du songe, for soprano and piano; texts by Yvan Goll (1959)
1. Vague ma sœur...
2. J’entends monter de toi...
3. Tant d’hirondelles...
4. Grandit un arbre de poussière...
- Trois pièces pour piano (1960)
- Cantate de chambre, for soprano, two ondes Martenot, piano, harp, vibraphone, marimba, three percussions; texts by Jean-Claude Eloy (1960)
1. Hiver
2. Ombre
- Interactions, for soprano, two vibraphones and percussion; text by Paul Éluard (1960)
- Stèle pour Omar Khayyam, for soprano, piano, harp, and percussion (1960)
1. Sommeil sur la terre...
2. Quand mon âme pure...
3. Chaque matin la rosée...
4. Lampes qui s’éteignent...
- Cinq poèmes de Saigyô, for soprano and piano (1960)
1. Que vraie la réalité...
2. Comment cette passion...
3. Aucun désir de vivre...
4. Mon unique désir...
5. Oh! combien plaintivement...
- Parenthèses, five short pedagogic pieces for piano solo (1960)
1. Hommage à Schoenberg (for getting familiar with atonalism)
2. Hommage à Webern (for studying the hand's crossing, the changes of tempi, the nuance precision)
3. Bali (for getting the habits to the wide registers and to the numerous passings of the thumb)
4. Flûte égyptienne (for working on the grace notes and the irrational values)
5. Amitabha: lumière infinie. Hommage à Messiaen (to acquire a subtle touch)
- Mobile, for solo flute (1961)
- Pièce pour piano, introduction to the Chants pour une ombre (1961)
- Chants pour une ombre, for soprano piano, harp, ondes Martenot, and three percussionists; texts by Jean-Claude Eloy (1961)
1. Chant 1
2. Chant 2
- Vître d’oubli, for soprano and six female voices (1961)
- Études I and II, for flute, violoncello, and harp (1962)

== Publicly performed works ==
- Étude III, for orchestra, with five percussionists, celesta, harp, and piano (1962)
- Équivalences, for 18 players (1963); commissioned by Pierre Boulez for the Darmstadt Festival
- Polychronies, for wind orchestra, six percussionists, piano, and harp (1964); first version premiered under the title Fragments; commissioned by the SWF for the Donaueschingen Festival
  - Silence du lac des étoiles
  - Vitres d’aurore
- Macles, for six instrumental groups (1967); from the film score for The Nun by Jacques Rivette
  - Version I (short)
  - Version II (long)
- Séquence et boucle, for a small instrumental group (1968); from the film score for Mad Love by Jacques Rivette
  - Séquence
  - Boucle
- Faisceaux-Diffractions, for 28 players (1970); commissioned by the Library of Congress, Washington
- Kâmakalâ ("Le Triangle des énergies"), for three orchestral groups, five choral groups, with three conductors (1971); commissioned by Maurice Fleuret and the French Ministry of Culture for the SMIP Festival (Semaines Musicales Internationales de Paris)
- Shânti ("Paix"), for electronic and concrete sounds (1972–73); commissioned by the WDR and realized at the WDR Studio for Electronic Music, Cologne
  - Overture: Les foules de la mémoire / Son de méditation
  - Extension part: Prémonition / Flash-back / Interview (Aurobindo / Mao)
  - Central part: Mantra des étoiles / Soldats
  - Final part: Vagues lentes, boucles de feu / Contemplation aux enfants / Vastitude
- Fluctuante-Immuable, for large orchestra (1977); commissioned by the French Ministry of Culture and the Orchestre de Paris
- Gaku-no-Michi ("Les Voies de la musique" or "Le Tao de la musique"), film without images for electronic and concrete sounds (1977–78); realized at the NHK Electronic Music Studio, Tokyo
  - Pachinko – Son d'introduction
    - Tokyo – La Voie des sons quotidiens. From the concrete to the abstract
    - Fushiki-e ("Vers ce qui n'est pas connaissable"). La Voie des sons de meditation. From the abstract to the concrete
  - Mokuso ("Contemplation") – Son d'immobilisation
    - Banbutsu-no-Ryudo ("Le flot incessant de toutes les choses"). La Voie des métamorphoses du sens. From the concrete to the concrete
    - Kaiso ("Réminiscence") – La Voie du sens au-delà des métamorphoses
  - Han – Son de prolongation
- Poème Picasso, radio work to text by Jean-Claude Eloy (1978); commissioned by Georges Leon for France-Culture and realized with two EMS synthesizers (VCS and AKS) plus a Revox (A77)
- Étude IV: Points-Lines-Landscape, electroacoustic music (1979); created on a UPIC computer at the studio of the CEMAMu, Issy-les-Moulineaux
- Yo-In ("Réverbérations"), théâtre sonore for an imaginary ritual in four acts, for electronic and concrete sounds (1980); realized at the Instituut voor Sonologie, Rijkuniversiteit, Utrecht
  - Act 1 Aube. Appel. Rituel d'imploration.
  - Act 2 Midi. Unification. Rituel d'absorption, d'intégration.
  - Act 3 Soir. Méditation. Rituel de contemplation.
  - Act 4 Nuit. Exorcisme. Rituel de libération.
- A l'approche du feu méditant, for 27 players of a Japanese gagaku orchestra, two choruses of Buddhist monks from the Tendai and Shingon sects (including 4 solo singers from the Shômyô tradition), six percussionists, and five bugaku dancers (1983); commissioned by the National Theater of Japan (Kokuritsu Gekijo), Tokyo
1. Le Regard vers la conscience contemplative [Towards contemplative awareness], for four solo monk singers (Shômyô technics), monk choir (unseen), one Ô-Hichiriki solo, two Ô-Shô, a few isolated percussion instruments
2. L'Appel vers le mouvement des choses [Beckoned by the movement of things], for nine gagaku wind instruments (3 Ryûteki, 2 Hichiriki, 1 Ô-Hichiriki, 2 Shô, 1 Ô-Shô)
3. Le Cheminement à travers les mondes [Progressing through worlds], for 27 gagaku instrumentalists, four groups of monk choirs (Shômyô technics – Sect Tendai and Shingon) including four soloists, six percussionists, and five bugaku dancers
- Anâhata ("Vibration primordiale" or "Vibration d’origine"), for five Japanese traditional musicians (three gagaku players and two Shômyô singers), percussion, electronic and concrete sounds, staging and lights (1984–86); commissioned by the Festival d’Automne à Paris
1. Âhata-Anâhata ("Le son frappé, le son non-frappé"), for two solo voices of Japanese Buddhist monks (Shômyô technics from the Tendai and Shingon sects), one Ô-Hichiriki solo, one percussionist with a percussion instruments orchestra, electronic and concrete sounds, with sound and light system
2. Akshara-Kshara ("L'immuable, le muable"), for Ryûteki solo, Hichiriki solo, electronic and concrete sounds, with sound and light system
3. Nîmîlana-Unmîlana ("Ce qui s'éveille, ce qui se replie"), for Shô solo (plus Ô-Shô and Sheng-Alto), electronic and concrete sounds, with sound and light system
- Libérations (1989, renamed Chants pour l'autre moitié du ciel [Songs for the Other Half of the Sky] in 2011); commissioned by the Festival d’Automne à Paris
1. Butsumyôe ("La cérémonie du repentir"), for two female voices (sopranos with extended vocal techniques, using varied percussion instruments); text by Ihara Saikaku (The Life of an Amourous Woman) in ancient Japanese from the Osaka area. Part I of the cycle Songs for the Other Half of the Sky
2. Sappho hiketis ("Sappho implorante"), for two female voices (sopranos with extended vocal techniques), and electroacoustic music; text by Sappho (fragments) in Greek language, with modern pronunciation. Part II of the cycle Songs for the Other Half of the Sky
- Erkos ("Chant, Louange"), for a solo Satsuma-Biwa player using vocal extended techniques and several percussion instruments, with electroacoustic music, to an extract from the Devi Upanishad and Devi Mahatmya in Sanskrit (1990–91); commissioned by the WDR and realized at the WDR Studio for Electronic Music, Cologne. Part III of the cycle Songs for the Other Half of the Sky
1. Introduction
2. Biwa 1
3. Unban
4. Biwa 2
5. Chœurs
- Galaxies (Sigma version), with the vocal solo ...kono yo no hoka... ("... ce monde au-delà ..."), for a vocalist using extended Shômyô vocal techniques from Japan, with electroacoustic music, light and staging; texts by Izumi Shikibu and Chiyojo in Japanese (1996); commissioned by Roger Lafosse for the festival Sigma and realized at the Electronic music studio of the Sweelinck Conservatory, Amsterdam. Part IV of the cycle Songs for the Other Half of the Sky
- Rosa, Sonia... Hannah, for two solo sopranos without accompaniment; texts by Rosa Luxemburg (Letters from Prison to Sophie Liebknecht) and Hannah Arendt (on Rosa Luxemburg) in German (1991); unfinished
- Gaia-songs, for soprano voice (sung) and actress voice (spoken), with electroacoustic music; texts by Jean-Claude Eloy in English (1992, new version 2015). Part V of the cycle Songs for the Other Half of the Sky
1. To Her
2. Call
3. Song (Eileithyia)
- Two American women, for soprano voice (sung) and actress voice (spoken), with electroacoustic music; texts by Anne Sexton and Mabel Dodge Luhan (1992, new version 2015). Part VI of the cycle Songs for the Other Half of the Sky
1. She (The Consecrating Mother)
2. I am
- Galaxies Full-Electro (Warsaw version), for electronic and concrete sounds (1986–1994); realized at the Electronic music studio of the Sweelinck Conservatory, Amsterdam
- Electro-Anâhata I-II-III. Electroacoustic (electronic and concrete sounds) electroacoustic parts alone from Anâhata, with several unpublished parts (1986–1994, revision and new master 2013); realized at the Electronic music studio of the Sweelinck Conservatory, Amsterdam
  - Part 1: Metal Metamorphoses. Five electroacoustic works of a contemplative nature
    - Station I: Multiplied Bells
    - Station II: Meditation Episode
    - Station III: Extension towards Infinity
    - Station IV: Metametal (short version)
    - Station V: The Revealed Sound
  - Part 2:
    - The Bird-Mirror in the Magic Forest (a tribute to Paul Klee)
    - The Reed, the Sea and the Stars (Introduction and Main part)
- L'Anneau des sept lumières [The Ring of the Seven Lights]; Metametal (long version). Seven continuous variations from a single Bonshô sample (Buddhist temple traditional bell from Japan). A tribute to Inayat and Vilayat Khan, for electronic and concrete sounds (1994–95, revision and new master 2013)
- Etats-Limites, ou les cris de Petra [Borderlines, or Petra's Shouts]. To the memory of Petra Meinel-Winkelbach, for electronic and concrete sounds (2013). Part VII of the cycle Songs for the Other Half of the Sky
- Le Minuit de la Foi [The Midnight of the Faith], for electronic and concrete sounds, to selected sentences by Edith Stein, recorded by German actress Gisela Claudius (2014). Part VIII a/b of the cycle Songs for the Other Half of the Sky
  - Morgendämmerung (Proposition, agitation, contemplation, illumination-jubilation-sublimation)
  - Dämmerlicht (Interrogation, tension, confrontation)
