= John McGuire (composer) =

American composer

John McGuire (born June 27, 1942 in Artesia, California) is an American composer, pianist, organist, and music editor.

== Biography ==
John McGuire initially studied composition with Robert Arthur Gross at Occidental College, where he earned a BA in 1964. He received a succession of three Alfred E. Hertz Traveling Scholarships from the University of California at Berkeley (1965–66, 1966–67, 1967–68), and a Fulbright Traveling Scholarship (1966–67), which together enabled him to study with Krzysztof Penderecki at the Folkwang Hochschule in Essen from 1966 to 1968, and at the Fourth Cologne Courses for New Music, under Karlheinz Stockhausen, in 1967. Two scholarships from the State of North Rhine–Westphalia for studies in Germany made it possible for him to participate in the composition studios given by Stockhausen at Darmstadt in 1967 and again in 1968. Returning to the United States, he continued his studies at the University of California, Berkeley, where his composition teachers included Ingolf Dahl and Seymour Shifrin. After completing his MA there in 1970, he once again moved to Europe, at first studying computer composition with Gottfried Michael Koenig at the Institute of Sonology of the University of Utrecht from 1970 to 1971.

Having found the atmosphere in Germany congenial, following his studies in Utrecht he settled in Germany again in 1972 and remained for the next twenty-five years, at first working as a pianist with the Rundfunk-Sinfonieorchester Saarbrücken from 1972 to 1975. From 1975 to 1977 he studied electronic music with Hans Ulrich Humpert at the Hochschule für Musik Köln, later working as an organist at the Kirche St. Nikolaus von Tolentino in Rösrath from 1979 to 1982.

He received six commissions from WDR in Cologne for pieces he realised in the electronic-music studio there, among them Pulse Music III in 1978, Vanishing Points in 1988, and A Cappella in 1997. He has also had works commissioned by Radio Bremen, from pianist Herbert Henck (48 Variations, for 2 pianos), from Dartmouth College, and from the Ministry of Culture of North Rhine–Westphalia. In 1995 he was composer-in-residence at the Akademie Schloss Wiepersdorf in Brandenburg.

In 1998 he returned to his native country, working for a time as an editor for the Carl Fischer music-publishing firm in New York City starting in 1998. From 2000 to 2002 he taught advanced composition and twentieth-century music as a part-time Visiting Adjunct Professor at Columbia University.

He is married to the soprano Beth Griffith, for whom he composed A Cappella in 1990–97 and Contradance in 2000–2004.

== Musical style and influences ==
Kyle Gann describes McGuire as a "postminimalist". His music seeks a synthesis of minimalism and the serialism with which he had become acquainted during his studies in Germany, especially with Stockhausen. "His work over the next 25 years was devoted entirely to the exploration and development of various aspects of this synthesis, in particular the fusion of elemental tonal functions with chromatic time structures". He is regarded as one of the key figures in the Cologne School.

His music is published by Feedback Studio (Cologne) and Breitkopf & Härtel

== Compositions ==
- String Trio No. 1 (1963–64)
- Study, for orchestra (1965)
- Divergences, for piano, 2 violins, 2 violas, 2 cellos (1965–66)
- String Trio No. 2 (1966)
- Cadenza, for string quartet (1966)
- Decay, for 8 horns (1967–70)
- Frieze, for 4 Pianos (1969–74)
- Pulse Music I, for tape (1975–76)
- Pulse Music II, for four pianos and small orchestra (1975–77)
- 48 Variations, for 2 pianos (1976–80)
- Pulse Music III, for tape (1978)
- Music for Horns, Pianos and Cymbals (1981)
- Cadence Music, for 21 players (1982–85)
- Vanishing Points, for tape (1985–88)
- A Cappella, for soprano and tape (1990–97)
- Contradance, for soprano and string quartet (2000–2004)
- Ordinary Measures, for mixed chorus (2004–05)

== Discography ==
- John McGuire. 1987. 48 Variations for Two Pianos. Largo (CD), 7243 5 56630 2 3.
- John McGuire. 2002. Pulse Music III; Vanishing Points; A Cappella. Beth Griffith, soprano. Sargasso (CD), SCD 28043.
- John McGuire. 2008. Cadence Music; Exchanges; Decay; Frieze; Music for Horns, Piano and Cymbals. Edition RZ 20003-4.
