= TriMedia =

TriMedia may refer to:

- TriMedia (mediaprocessor), a media processor made by Philips/NXP Semiconductors
- Trimedia International, a European public-relations agency
- Trimedia, a planthopper in subfamily Dictyopharinae

Similarly named pages:

- Trymedia, a digital distribution company
