= August von Othegraven =

August von Othegraven (2 June 1864 in Cologne – 11 March 1946 in Wermelskirchen) was a German composer and music pedagogue.

He worked as a professor of choral singing at the Cologne Musikhochschule. Amongst his pupils were Theodor Schwake and Herbert Eimert. The "August von Othegraven Plakette" named after him is bestowed as a medal and badge in bronze, silver, and gold, for services to the cultural care and promotion of choral singing.

== Sources ==
- Voss, Bert. August von Othegraven: Leben und Werke. Beiträge zur rheinischen Musikgeschichte 49. Cologne: Arno Volk Verlag, 1961.
