= Karl Gerstner =

Swiss designer, typographer, author and artist

- Born: 2 July 1930
- Died: 1 January 2017 (aged 86); Basel, Switzerland
- Occupations: Typographer, designer, author and artist
- Known for: Co-founded GGK advertising agency

Karl Gerstner (2 July 1930 – 1 January 2017) was a Swiss designer, typographer, author, and artist.

== Career ==
Gerstner attended Allgemeine Gewerbeschule Basel.

From 1944 to 1948, Gerstner apprenticed as a typographer for artist Fritz Bühler's studio, alongside graphic designer Armin Hofmann, in Basel, Switzerland.

His supervisor at Bühler's studio, Max Schmid, later went on to work at the Geigy chemical company. In 1949, Gerstner began freelancing for Geigy after Schmid recruited him.

In 1958, he and Markus Kutter formed Gerstner+Kutter advertising agency in Basel. In 1962, they partnered with Paul Gredinger, and Gerstner+Kutter became GGK (Gerstner, Gredinger + Kutter), a leading Swiss advertising agency.

In 2006 Gerstner donated his entire archive to the Swiss National Library in Bern, and the Karl Gerstner Archive sets out to document his design process from the earliest drafts to the final product.

Gerstner died in Basel University Hospital on 1 January 2017.

== Exhibitions ==
designing programs/programming designs by Karl Gerstner was a solo exhibition on view from February 5 to March 30, 1973, at the Museum of Modern Art, New York directed by Emilio Ambasz. The exhibition was based on Gerstner's book Designing Programms.

== Typefaces ==
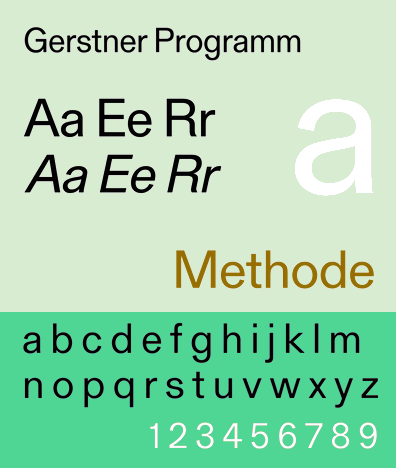
Specimen of the typeface Gerstner Programm

Gerstner Programm was designed by Karl Gerstner between 1964–67 and first published in Berthold's Diatype filmsetting format. 16 versions of the programme were generated, 8 regular and 8 italic, using the Sinar camera under the expert direction of GGK staff member Werner Richli. Templates were executed by Christian Mengelt. It was successful in the U.S., where it was issued by Aaron Burns, but soon perished with the Diatype system.

A digital restoration by Stephan Müller of Gerstner Programm has been released in 2017.

== Bibliography ==
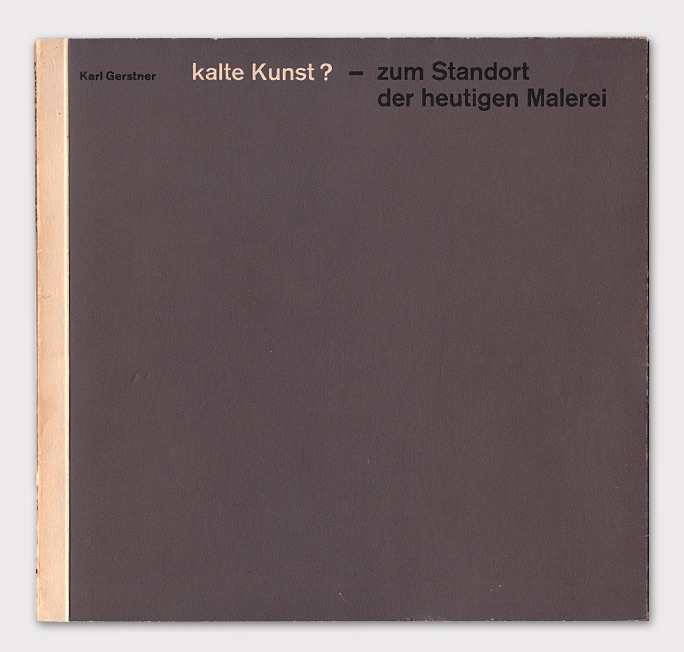
Cover of kalte Kunst?

- Gerstner, Karl (1957). kalte Kunst? (in German) (1st ed.). Teufen, Switzerland: Arthur Niggli.
- Gerstner, Karl (1963). kalte Kunst? (in German) (2nd ed.). Teufen, Switzerland: Arthur Niggli.

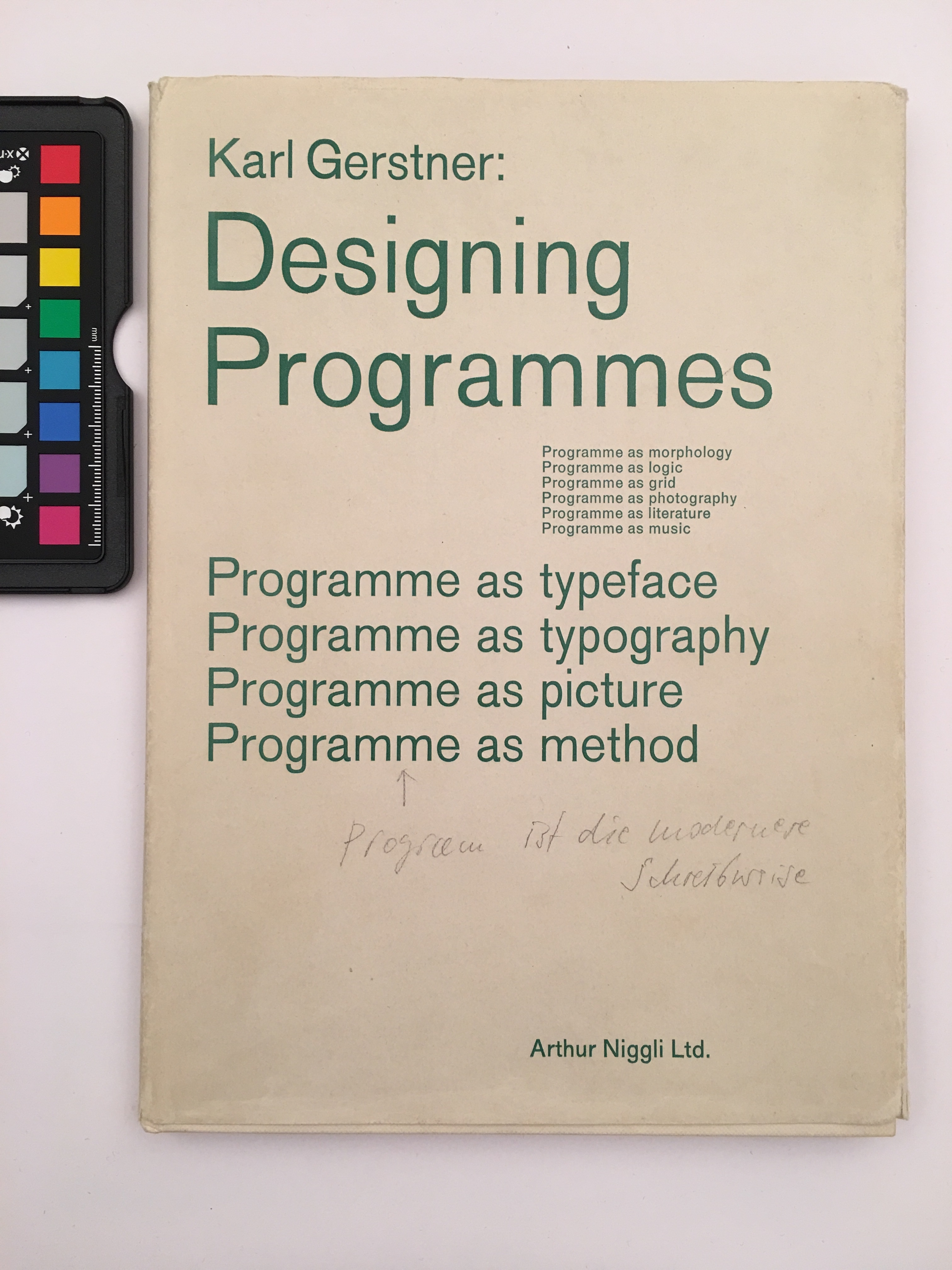
Cover of Designing Programmes, English edition from 1968

- Gerstner, Karl (1964). Programme Entwerfen [Designing Programmes]. Teufen, Switzerland: Arthur Niggli.
- Gerstner, Karl (1968). Designing Programmes (four essays and an introduction, 2nd enlarged ed.). Teufen, Switzerland: Verlag Arthur Niggli AG. p. 112.
- Gerstner, Karl (1972). Kompendium für Alphabeten: Systematik der Schrift von Karl Gerstner [Compendium for Literates - A System of Writing by Karl Gerstner]. Teufen, Switzerland: Arthur Niggli. ISBN 3-7212-0236-8.
- Gerstner, Karl (1981). Der Geist der Farbe: Karl Gerstner und seine Kunst [The Spirit of Colors: The Art of Karl Gerstner]. Stuttgart: Deutsche Verlags-Anstalt. ISBN 978-3421060631.
- Gerstner, Karl (1986). Die Formen der Farben [The Forms of Color]. Frankfurt: Athenäum. ISBN 978-3761084175.
- Gerstner, Karl (1986). Der Künstler und die Mehrheit. Frankfurt: Syndikat Verlag. ISBN 3-434-46073-X.
- Gerstner, Karl (1990). Avant Garde Küche - Prinzipien statt Rezepte [Avant Garde Kitchen - principles instead of recipes]. Heiden, Switzerland: Verlag Arthur Niggli AG. ISBN 3-7212-0237-6.
- Gerstner, Karl (2001). Review of 5 x 10 Years of Graphic Design etc. Hatje Cantz. p. 256. ISBN 978-3775790598.
- Gerstner, Karl (2004). Karl Gerstner: Review Of Seven Chapters Of Constructive Pictures, Etc. Hatje Cantz. p. 256. ISBN 978-3775791519.
- Gerstner, Karl (2007). Geisler, Harald; Pabst, Jonas (eds.). Designing Programmes (five essays and an introduction, 3rd revised and enlarged by the author ed.). Baden, Switzerland: Lars Müller Publishers. p. 120. ISBN 978-3-03778-093-0. "Typography is an art not in spite of its serving a purpose but for that very reason. The designer's freedom lies not at the margin of a task but at its very centre. Only then is the typographer free to perform as an artist when he understands and ponders his task in all its parts. And every solution he finds on this basis will be an integral one, will achieve a unity between language and type, between content and form. Integral means: shaped into a whole. There the Aristotelian dictum that the whole is greater than the sum of its parts is assumed. And this vitally concerns typography. Typography is the art of making a whole out of predetermined parts. The typographer "sets". He sets individual letters into words, words into sentences. Letters are the elementary particles of the written language – and thus of typography. They are figurative signs for sounds without content, parts which acquire a meaning and a value only if they are combined."
