= Jean-Claude Éloy =

French composer (1938–2025)

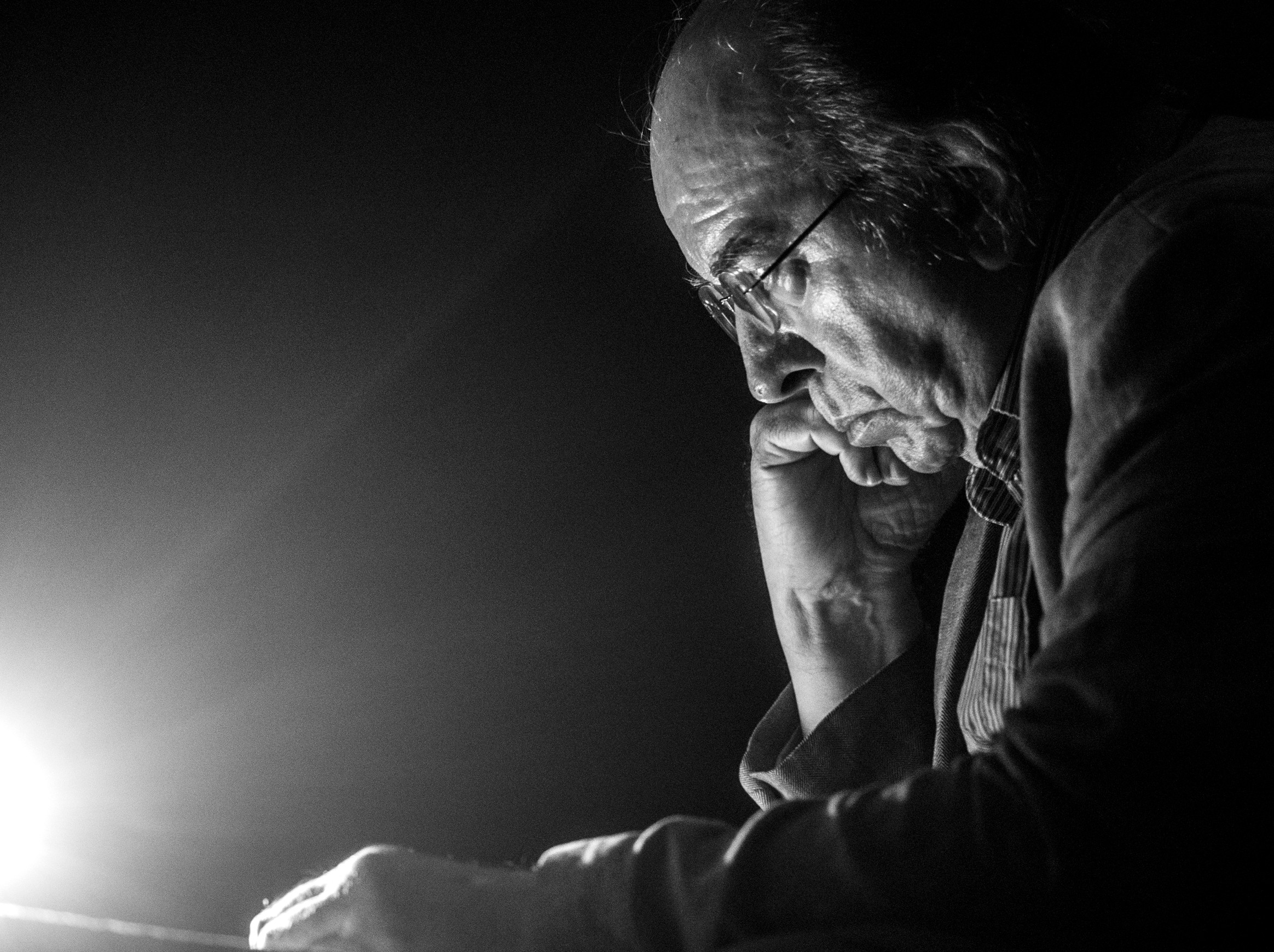
- Éloy in 2015
- Born: 15 June 1938; Mont-Saint-Aignan, France
- Died: 19 November 2025 (aged 87); Neuilly-sur-Seine, France
- Education: Conservatoire de Paris
- Occupations: Composer; Academic teacher
- Organizations: University of California, Berkeley; Studio for Electronic Music (WDR); Electronic Music Studio of NHK
- Works: List of compositions

Jean-Claude Éloy (15 June 1938 – 19 November 2025) was a French composer of instrumental, vocal and electroacoustic music. He taught at the University of California, Berkeley, and collaborated with studios of electronic music in Cologne and in Tokyo. Inspired beyond Western classical music traditions by Hindu and Japanese philosophy and music, he composed long ritual pieces.

== Life and career ==
Éloy was born in Mont-Saint-Aignan near Rouen on 15 June 1938. He studied with Darius Milhaud and Maurice Martenot at the Conservatoire de Paris from the age of twelve. He was awarded four premier prix: in piano (1957), in chamber music (1958), in counterpoint (1959), and in ondes Martenot (1960). During this same period he attended the Darmstädter Ferienkurse in 1957, 1960, and 1961, where he studied with Hermann Scherchen, Olivier Messiaen, Pierre Boulez, and Karlheinz Stockhausen. He was especially impressed by Henri Pousseur. Between 1961 and 1963, he also studied with Boulez at the City of Basel Music Academy.

In 1966, he joined the faculty of the University of California, Berkeley, where he taught until 1968. Afterwards, he moved away from serial music and turned to references to philosophy and music of Asian traditions, with a focus on the ritual function of music. He travelled to India and Japan to study philosophies and mythologies. His 1971 composition Kâmakalâ (Triangle of Energies) marks a turning point.

At Stockhausen's invitation, he spent 1972–73 working at the Studio for Electronic Music of the broadcaster WDR in Cologne, where he produced Shânti (Peace, revised in 1974), for electronic and concrete sounds, in which he explored timbre and aspects of musical time. It was influenced by Heraclitus's philosophy about the struggle of opposites, and by writings of Sri Aurobindo. In 1977, Éloy spent long periods of time in Japan, realising one of the high-points in his electronic-music output, the nearly four-hour-long Gaku-no-Michi (The Paths of Music), at the Electronic Music Studio of NHK in Tokyo, He created a dialectic music of concrete sounds from everyday life in Japan and abstract, purely synthetically generated sounds. From 1978, he worked at the Centre d'Études de Mathématiques et Automatique Musicales (CCMIX), founded by Iannis Xenakis. From 1983 to 1993, he was a co-founder of the Centre d'informatique appliquée à la musique et à l'image (CIAMI).

In the late 1980s, Éloy embarked on a cycle of compositions collectively titled Libérations, focusing on women or the feminine principle, and developed in collaboration with exceptional vocalists such as Junko Ueda, Fátima Miranda, and Yumi Nara. Each work is devoted to one or another woman from mythology, literature, or cultural history, and features female solo voices with instruments and electro-acoustics. The first two works of the cycle, Sappho Hikètis (The Imploring Sappho) and Butsumyôe (Ceremony of Repentance) were composed in 1989. These were followed in 1990–91 by Erkos (Hymn of Praise), then by Gaia Songs (1991–92), and finally Galaxies (Sigma version 1996). In 2011, the composer decided to re-title the cycle Chants pour l'autre moitié du ciel (Songs for the Other Half of the Sky), subtitled Songs of Loneliness, of Supplication, of Revolt, of Celebrations, or of Prayers.

Éloy founded his own publishing house and record company, hors territoires, with the aim of documenting his artistic work through the publication of books and compact discs.

Éloy died after a long serious illness on 19 November 2025, at the age of 87.

== Style and technique ==
Through most of his career, Asian (especially Hindu) music and aesthetics have had a strong influence on Éloy's music. In some earlier works, Fibonacci numbers played a part – in a very obvious way in Équivalences, where fermatas are assigned values of 1/2, 1, 1 1/2, 2 1/2, 4, and 6 1/2 seconds, and disguised by arbitrary arithmetic transformations in the rhythms of the withdrawn composition Macles.

Regarding Équivalences (1963), the composer stated:

The title refers to numerous aspects of the piece and should be interpreted in the sense of an equilibrium between contrasting forces. In the simplest terms, there is the deployment of musical instruments: A triple symmetry in an arc formed by 6 percussionists, 3 groups of winds and piano-celesta with harp. On a higher plane, we may regard it as a depiction of the contrasting elements that make up the work: density: zero to maximum; registers: fixed to mobile; coordination: absolute to relative, etc. The whole form itself reflects these oppositions, this dialectic play, whence derives a contrasting sonority, an extension of the dynamic field. Certain structures are variable from one performance to another, utilizing modifiable intensities that affect mainly the duration of the percussion instruments' resonances. To illustrate: a contrast is created between wind instruments producing long held sounds on the one hand, and on the opposite side are percussion instruments, piano, harp, etc., producing sounds of rapid growth and decay. Bit by bit, these sounds are drawn closer until they are confronted. The movement continues until the sounds are at their initial state, but on opposite sides: the winds producing "pointed" sounds, while the percussion instruments, by means of complicated trills, etc., produce long held sounds. Henri Pousseur describes this development as an "arc of duration".

== Work ==
- Nocturne, for piano (1954)
- Stèle pour Omar Khayyam, for soprano, piano, harp, and percussion (1960)
- Étude III, for orchestra, with five percussions, celesta, harp, and piano (1962)
- Équivalences, for 18 players (1963)
- Faisceaux-Diffractions, for 28 players (1970)
- Kâmakalâ (Le Triangle des énergies), for three orchestral groups, five choral groups, with three conductors (1971)
- Shânti (Paix), for electronic and concrete sounds (1972–73)
- Fluctuante-Immuable, for large orchestra (1977)
- Gaku-no-Michi (Les Voies de la musique or Le Tao de la musique), film without images for electronic and concrete sounds (1977–78); realized at the NHK Electronic Music Studio, Tokyo
- Yo-In (Réverbérations), théâtre sonore for an imaginary ritual in four acts, for electronic and concrete sounds (1980); realized at the Instituut voor Sonologie, Rijkuniversiteit, Utrecht
- A l'approche du feu méditant, for 27 players of a Japanese gagaku orchestra, two choruses of Buddhist monks from the Tendai and Shingon sects, six percussionists, and five bugaku dancers (1983); commissioned by the National Theater of Japan (Kokuritsu Gekijo), Tokyo
- Anâhata (Vibration primordiale or Vibration d’origine), for five Japanese traditional musicians (three gagaku players and two Shômyô singers), percussion, electronic and concrete sounds, staging and lights (1984–86); commissioned by the Festival d’Automne à Paris
- Libérations (1989, renamed Chants pour l'autre moitié du ciel (Songs for the Other Half of the Sky) in 2011); commissioned by the Festival d’Automne à Paris
1. Butsumyôe (La cérémonie du repentir), for two female voices (sopranos with extended vocal techniques, using varied percussion instruments)
2. Sappho hiketis (Sappho implorante), for two female voices (sopranos with extended vocal techniques), and electroacoustic music
- Erkos (Chant, Louange), for a solo Satsuma-Biwa player using vocal extended techniques and several percussion instruments, with electroacoustic music (1990–91); commissioned by the Westdeutscher Rundfunk and realized at the WDR Studio for Electronic Music, Cologne
- Galaxies (Sigma version), with the vocal solo ...kono yo no hoka... (... ce monde au-delà ...), for a vocalist using extended Shômyô vocal techniques, with electroacoustic music, light and staging (1996); commissioned by Roger Lafosse for the Sigma festival and realized at the Electronic music studio of the Sweelinck Conservatory, Amsterdam
- L'Anneau des sept lumières (The Ring of the Seven Lights); Metametal (long version). Seven continuous variations from a single Bonshô sample, for electronic and concrete sounds (1994–95, revision and new master 2013)
- Etats-Limites, ou les cris de Petra (Borderlines, or Petra's Shouts), for electronic and concrete sounds (2013)
- Le Minuit de la Foi (The Midnight of the Faith), for electronic and concrete sounds (2014)
