= Peter von Zahn =

- Born: 29 January 1913; Chemnitz, Germany
- Died: 26 July 2001 (aged 88); Hamburg, Germany
- Occupation: Author

Peter von Zahn (29 January 1913 – 26 July 2001) was a German author, film maker, and journalist.

Born in Chemnitz as a son of an officer, he grew up in Dresden and studied law, history, and philosophy. He was drafted at the beginning of World War II. After the war, he was one of the founders of the Nordwestdeutscher Rundfunk (NWDR). For three years, he managed the NWDR Studio in Düsseldorf where he introduced Anglo-Saxon style journalism with self-critical irony.

In 1951, he went to the United States as a foreign correspondent. He worked until a very advanced age and produced over 3000 radio shows and 1000 television films.

He received many awards such as the Adolf-Grimme-Preis (3), the DAG-Fernsehpreis in Silver and Gold, the Goldene Kamera and the Bavarian TV Award, and is considered the standard for subsequent radio and television journalism. The State of Hamburg promoted him in 1995 to a Professor honoris causa.

He died in Hamburg aged 88.
