= Karl Gottfried Brunotte =

German composer and music philosopher

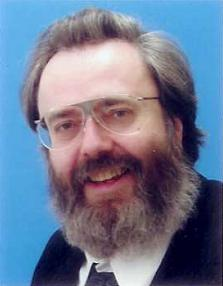
Karl Gottfried Brunotte

Karl Gottfried Brunotte (born 2 June 1958 in Frankfurt) is a German composer and music philosopher, particularly noted for his contributions to church music.

== Life ==
Brunotte studied music sociology, music psychology, ancient languages, aesthetics, piano, organ, harpsichord, violin, viola, recorder, singing, conducting, and musical composition, as well as electronic music, with (amongst others) Heinz Werner Zimmermann, Lothar Hoffmann-Erbrecht, Hans Peter Haller, Gottfried Michael Koenig, and Karlheinz Stockhausen.

From 1974 to 1977 he held the position of Cantor at the Christuskirche in Bad Homburg, where he later was a lecturer at the Hochschule für Musik und darstellende Kunst (1982–1985). From 1980 to 1986 he was Senior Lecturer at the International Vacation Courses for New Music in Darmstadt, and a member of the Darmstadt Institute for Music and Musical Education. In the 1984–85 year he was Rapporteur für Ernste Musik at the Landsmusikrat Hessen. Once a Jesuit novice, in 1987 he joined the Church of Jesus Christ of Latter-day Saints.

Since 1993 he has worked at the University of Frankfurt in the Institut für Musikwissenschaft und Musikpädagogik, as well as at the Fachhochschule Frankfurt für elektronische Musik.

He has composed nearly 300 pieces for the most diverse forces.

In addition to his compositional and teaching activities, Brunotte has been involved for decades in academic administration. In May 2012 he stood unsuccessfully against the incumbent, Hans-Eberhard Schurk, in the election for President of the Augsburg University of Applied Sciences.

== Select list of compositions ==
- Apokrypta, for organ (1999)
- Dimensiones orbitalis IV, for harp (2006)
- Dunkelziffer, for maximum-range voice, percussion, and electronic sounds (1997)
- Erdenlicht, in memoriam Marc Chagall, for flute, bassoon, and piano (with assistant)
- Hypotosis … selene …, for a clarinetist, a pianist/percussionist, and electronic sounds (1997)
- In aeternum II, for organ
- Intemporale, for clarinet, piano, and metronome
- Lehis Traum
- Mater dolorosa, for violin and piano
- Nachruf für Werner Heissenberg, electronic and concrete music
- Tangenten, for piano (1975)
- Ultravox I & III
