= Zoltán Pongrácz =

Hungarian composer

Zoltán Pongrácz (5 February 1912 – 3 April 2007) was a Hungarian composer.

Pongrácz was born in Diószeg and studied composition from 1930 to 1935 with Zoltán Kodály at the Budapest Academy of Music, in Hungary. He became professor of composition at the Debrecen Conservatory in 1947 and continued in that position until 1958.

For a time he ceased compositional activity, until attending the Darmstadt summer courses in 1964, 1965, and 1972, and the third Cologne Courses for New Music in 1965–66 with Karlheinz Stockhausen, Henri Pousseur, Luc Ferrari, and Jaap Spek, and in Utrecht with Gottfried Michael Koenig stimulated an interest in electronic composition. He was professor of electronic composition at the Budapest Academy from 1975 to 1995. He died in Budapest on 2 April 2007.

== Compositions (selective list) ==
- Az ördög ajándéka [The Devil's Present], ballet to a libretto by the composer (1936)
- Apollo musagètes, women's voices, clarinet, piano, and percussion (1958)
- Negritude, for chorus and percussion (1962)
- Ispirazioni, for chorus, orchestra, and tape (1965)
- Phonothese, for tape (1965–66)
- Hangok és zörejek [Tones and Noises], for orchestra (1966)
- Mariphonia, for tape (1972)
- Concertino for Saxophone and Tape (1972)
- Rapszódia, voices and gypsy band (1976)
- 144 hang [144 sounds], for tape (1977)
- Madrigál Petrarca LXI. Szonett [Madrigal on Petrarca's Sonnet No LXI] (1980)
- Contrasts polaires et succesifs, for tape (1986)
- Contrastes polaires et successifs (1987)
- Concertino for Cimbalom and Electronics (1989)
- Ut omnes unum sint, for chorus, reciting chorus, 3 trumpets, 3 trombones, tuba, 2 pianos, 3 violins, contrabass, 2 synthesizers, and tape (1995)
