= Hans Heinz Stuckenschmidt =

German composer, musicologist, and historian and critic of music

Hans Heinz Stuckenschmidt (1 November 1901 – 15 August 1988) was a German composer, musicologist, and historian and critic of music.

== Life ==
Stuckenschmidt was born in Strasbourg. At as early an age as 19, he was the Berlin-based music critic/correspondent for the Prague-based periodical Bohemia, and lived as a freelance music writer in Hamburg, Vienna, Paris, Berlin and Prague, becoming personally acquainted with numerous composers of avant-garde music.

Amongst his most prominent musical productions were the "new music" concert cycle in Hamburg, and the 1927-8 concerts of the Berlin November Group with Max Butting.

In 1929, Stuckenschmidt became the successor to Adolf Weissmans as the music critic at the Berliner Zeitung am Mittag. In December 1934, he was forbidden by the fascist government to continue as a musical critic because of his positive review of Alban Berg's opera Lulu. Due to political pressure owing to the newly empowered Nazi regime, he left the paper, later moving to Prague before the Nazi work ban went into effect and continued writing for foreign newspapers. In March 1939, the German forces occupied Prague and seized Stuckenschmidt's passport, cutting off his opportunity for emigration. In 1941, he was given the choice between arrest and military service and became an English and French interpreter for the German army.

After the end of the war, Stuckenschmidt became the director of "new music" at the RIAS American-run radio station in Berlin. In 1947 he became the music critic of the Neuen Zeitung and of the influential Berlin Newspaper Der Tagesspiegel, later also becoming a professor at the Music Department of the Technische Universität Berlin.

Amongst his most prominent work were writings on Arnold Schoenberg, Boris Blacher, Ferruccio Busoni and Maurice Ravel. Stuckenschmidt was married to the singer Margot Hinnenberg-Lefebre (1901-1981), well known for her performances of contemporary music, particularly Schoenberg. He received numerous honours for his work, and was a member of the Deutsche Akademie für Sprache und Dichtung, Darmstadt.

In Darmstadt he also taught at the Darmstädter Ferienkurse. He died in Berlin, aged 86.

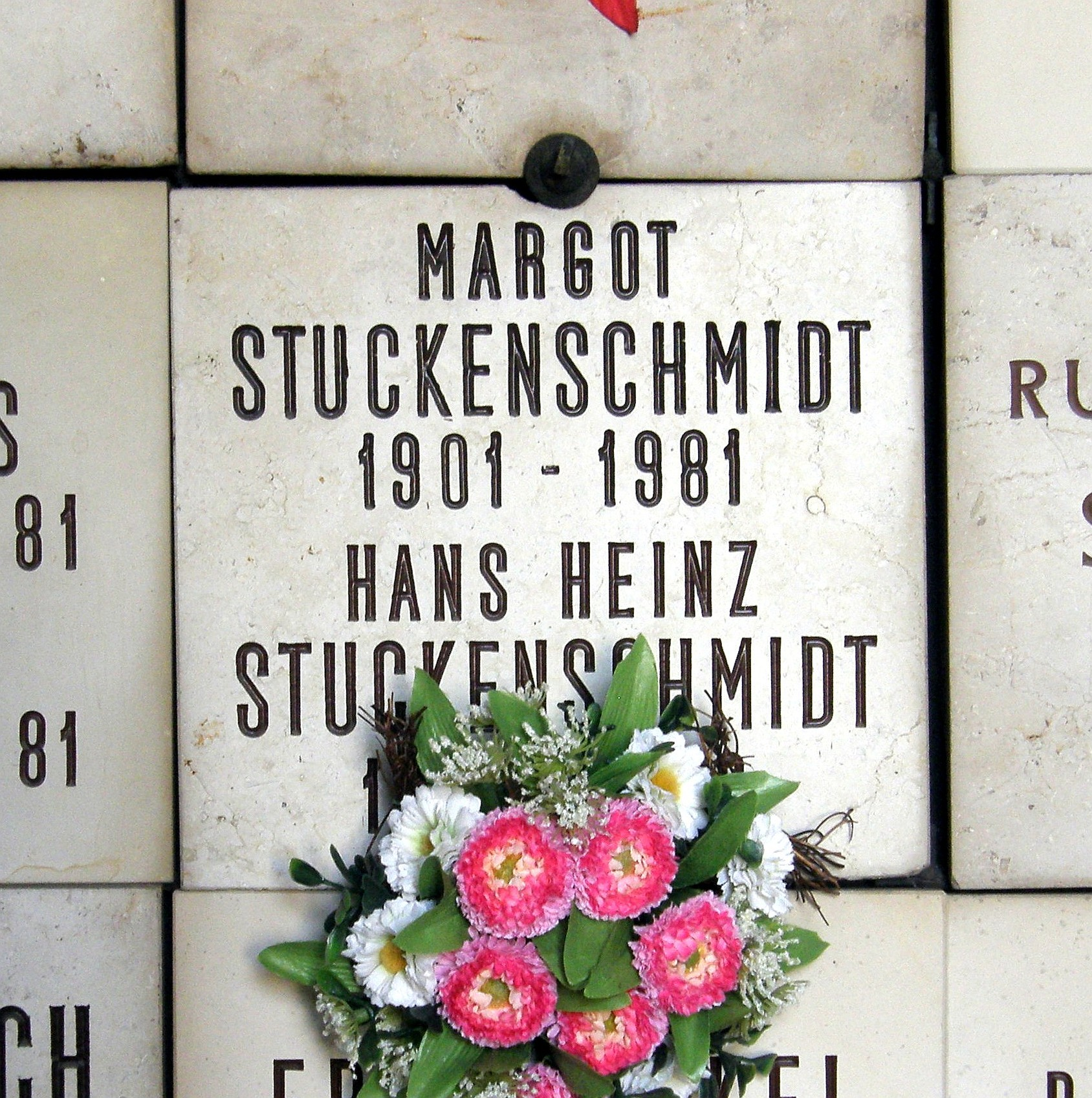
Grave of Stuckenschmidt

== Books ==
- Arnold Schoenberg (1951, tr. 1959 by Edith Temple Roberts and Humphrey Searle, published by John Calder)
- Maurice Ravel: Variations on his Life and Work (London, Calder & Boyars, 1969)
- Twentieth Century Music (New York, McGraw Hill, 1969)
- Germany and Central Europe (Vol. 2 of Twentieth Century Composers, Holt, Rinehart, and Winston, 1971)
- Ferruccio Busoni: Chronicle of a European (New York, St Martin's Press, 1972)
- Schoenberg: Leben, Umwelt, Werk (Zurich, 1974)
  - Schoenberg: His Life, World and Work (London, John Calder, translated by Humphrey Searle, 1977)
- Zum Hören geboren. Ein Leben mit der Musik unserer Zeit (R. Piper, 1979)
- Boris Blacher: Biographie und Werkanalysen (Bote & Bock, 1985)
