= Trimedia International =

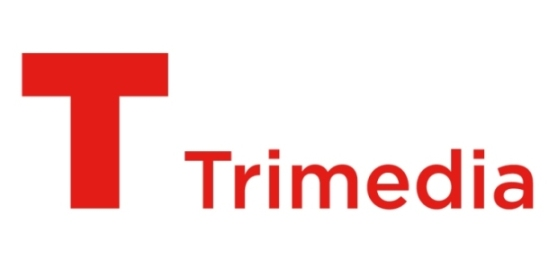
- Industry: PR agency
- Founded: 1961; 64 years ago in Switzerland
- Defunct: 2009
- Fate: Merged with sister company Mmd
- Successor: Grayling Global
- Number of locations: 30 offices
- Number of employees: Approx. 600
- Parent: Huntsworth (2004-2009)

Trimedia International was a pan-European PR agency employing around 600 staff in 30 offices and 11 European countries. In August 2009, Huntsworth, the parent company of Trimedia, announced that Trimedia would merge with sister company Mmd which has 18 offices in Central Europe, Russia and Eurasia and Grayling which has offices in The Americas, Middle East, and Asia Pacific. The new company is called Grayling Global and is the second largest independent PR firm in the world. The changes took effect from 1 January 2010.

== History ==
Established in 1961 in Switzerland, Trimedia was acquired by Huntsworth in 2004. Michael Murphy, was appointed International CEO, leading to rapid growth across Europe.

In 2005, Huntsworth’s merger with Incepta plc brought former Citigate offices into the family. Huntsworth axed the Citigate Communications brand in the UK following its takeover of Incepta in 2005.

In January 2007, Harrison Cowley merged with Trimedia in the UK, placing the consultancy into the Top 15 in PR Week’s annual Top 150.

== Awards ==
- Agency of the year - European Excellence Awards 2008

== Clients ==
Trimedia's clients include many global brands. Some of these clients include the following:

- BT plc
- COLT Telecom Group
- Land Rover
- NHS Blood and Transplant
- Xerox

== Archive: Major News ==
- 2009 - Huntsworth announced that it was to consolidate its global brands into four companies; Grayling, Citigate, Red and Huntsworth Health.
- 2009 - Trimedia Germany appoints new CEO.
- 2009- Vivien Hepworth and Loretta Tobin to lead new Grayling.
- 2005 - Huntsworth puts Murphy at helm of Citigate firms.
- 2004 - Huntsworth plc bought Grayling, Hudson Sandler and continental PR network Trimedia to take the group's annual fee income above pounds 50m. The deal, unveiled by CEO Lord Chadlington, saw Huntsworth acquire Trimedia, the largest independent PR network in Europe.
