= Franco Evangelisti (composer) =

Italian composer

Franco Evangelisti (January 21, 1926 – January 28, 1980) was an Italian composer specifically interested in the scientific theories behind sound.

== Biography ==
Born in Rome, Evangelisti abandoned engineering studies in order to dedicate himself to musical composition. In 1948 he became a composition student of Daniele Paris in Rome, where he also studied piano with Erich Arndt. In 1952 he moved to Germany, where he pursued advanced composition studies with Harald Genzmer at the Hochschule für Musik Freiburg. Starting in 1952 he took part in the Darmstädter Ferienkurse, where he had the opportunity of meeting Werner Meyer-Eppler of the University of Bonn, thanks to which he began to be interested in electronic music. At the invitation of Herbert Eimert, in 1956–57 he worked in the electronic studio of the Westdeutscher Rundfunk in Cologne.

In 1957, the orchestral conductor Hermann Scherchen invited him to work in the Studio of Experimental Electroacoustics of UNESCO in Gravesano, where he became involved with biophysics and explored the possibility of directly translating brain impulses into sonic vibrations.

In 1960, together with other musicians such as Francisco Pennisi and Aldo Clementi, he founded the Nuova Consonanza association and, in 1964, the improvisation group of the same name.

In 1980, after nearly twenty years' work, he finished his book Dal silenzio a un nuovo mondo sonoro (From Silence to a New Sonorous World), which has come to be regarded as "an important record of one of the most radical minds of the Italian postwar avant garde". He died in Rome on 28 January 1980.

== Compositions (selective list) ==
- Concerto, for cello and orchestra (1953)
- La terra ha sete di pianto, for soprano and piano (1953)
- Quattro fattoriale (4!), little pieces for violin and piano (1954–55)
- Ordini, for 16 instruments (1955)
- Due conversari, for oboe, strings, and percussion (1954–56)
- Proiezioni sonore, for piano (1955–56)
- Incontri di fasce sonore, electronic composition (1956–57)
- Random or Not Random, for orchestra (1956–62)
- Proporzioni, structures for solo flute (1958)
- Aleatorio, for string quartet (1959)
- Spazio a cinque, for voices, 5 percussionists, and electronics (1959–61)
- Campi integrati no. 2, game for 9 instruments (1959–79)
- Condensazioni, for orchestra (1960–62)
- Die Schachtel (The Box), pantomime, for mimes, projections, and chamber orchestra, on a text by Franco Nonnis (1962–63)
- Campi integrati no. 2, game for nine instruments (1959–79)

== Publications ==
- Dal silenzio a un nuovo mondo sonoro, Franco Evangelisti, Roma: Semar 1991. ISBN 88-7778-019-3
