= Konrad Boehmer =

German-Dutch composer, educator, and writer

Konrad Boehmer (24 May 1941 – 4 October 2014) was a German-Dutch composer, educator, and writer.

== Life ==
Boehmer was born in Berlin. A self-declared member of the Darmstadt School, he studied composition in Cologne with Karlheinz Stockhausen and Gottfried Michael Koenig. At the University of Cologne he studied philosophy, sociology, and musicology, earning a PhD in 1966. Then he settled in Amsterdam, working at Utrecht University's Institute for Sonology until 1968. In 1972, he became professor of music history and theory at the Royal Conservatory of The Hague.

== Musical style ==
His compositions characteristically employ serial organization or montage, sometimes with elements of jazz and rock music (as in his opera Doktor Faustus and the electronic Apocalipsis cum figuris). In other works, such as Canciones del camino and Lied uit de vert, Marxist songs serve as basic material.

In 2001, the Holland Festival commissioned Boehmer to write a composition for the rock band Sonic Youth, which they performed at both concerts during that festival in the Stadsschouwburg Amsterdam.

== Death ==
On 10 August 2014, while on holiday in the south of France, he suffered a cerebral infarction. He was taken to Amsterdam, where he died on 4 October 2014.

== Selected compositions ==
- Variation for chamber orchestra (1959–61)
- Position for electronic sounds, vocal sounds, and orchestra (1960–61)
- Zeitläufte for eight instruments (1962)
- Information (1964–65)
- Aspekt electronic music (1964–66)
- Canciones del camino for orchestra (1973–74)
- Schrei dieser Erde for percussion and tape, (1979)
- Doktor Faustus opera (1980–83)
- Apocalipsis cum figuris, electronic music (1984)
- Woutertje Pieterse for nine vocalists and orchestra (1985–1987)
- Il combattimento for violin, cello, and orchestra (1989–90)
- Et in Arcadia ego for string quartet (1992)
- Kronos protos for 14 instruments (1995)
- Nuba for flute, viola and harp (1998)
- Orpheus Unplugged (1999–2000) piano and tape
- Ouroboros for piano (2002)
- Doktor Fausti Höllenfahrt for orchestra (2006)
