= Gottfried Michael Koenig =

German-Dutch composer (1926–2021)

Gottfried Michael Koenig (5 October 1926 – 30 December 2021) was a German-Dutch composer.

== Biography ==
Born in Magdeburg, Koenig studied church music in Braunschweig at the Niedersächsische Musikschule Braunschweig, followed by musical composition, piano, analysis, and acoustics at the Hochschule für Musik Detmold. He continued his studies in music representation techniques at the Hochschule für Musik Köln and computer technique at the University of Bonn. Koenig attended the Darmstädter Ferienkurse (Darmstadt music summer schools) and later served there as a lecturer.

From 1954 to 1964, Koenig worked in the electronic studio of West German Radio (WDR), where he produced his electronic compositions Klangfiguren, Essay and Terminus 1, and wrote chamber and orchestral music. During this period, he also assisted other composers, including Mauricio Kagel, Franco Evangelisti, György Ligeti (with Artikulation), Herbert Brün and Karlheinz Stockhausen (with the realization of Gesang der Jünglinge and Kontakte).

From 1961 to 1965, Koenig taught at the Gaudeamus Foundation in Bilthoven, and from 1962 to 1964 at the Hochschule für Musik Köln. In 1964 he moved to the Netherlands, where he taught at Utrecht University and was, until 1986, director and later chairman of the electronic music studio (later the Institute of Sonology). There he developed his computer composition programs Project 1 (1964) and Project 2 (1966), designed to formalise the composition of musical structure-variants. Both programs had a significant impact on the development of algorithmic composition systems.

His sound synthesis program SSP (started 1971) is based on the representation of sound as a sequence of amplitudes in time. It makes use of the methods of aleatoric and groupwise selection of elements employed in Project 1 and Project 2. He continued to produce electronic works (Terminus 2, the Funktionen series). These were followed by the application of his computer programs, resulting in chamber music (Übung for piano, the Segmente series, 3 ASKO Pieces, String Quartet 1987, String Trio) and works for orchestra (Beitrag, Concerti e Corali).

Koenig later taught Algorithmic Composition in 2002/03 at Technische Universität Berlin.

== Writings ==
Six volumes of his theoretical writings were published between 1991 and 2008 under the title Ästhetische Praxis by Pfau Verlag. An Italian selection appeared under the title Genesi e forma (Rome: Semar, 1995), and an English one under the title Process and Form (Hofheim: Wolke, 2018).

== Reception ==
His works Terminus 2 and Funktion Grün were selected by the British magazine The Wire in 1998 for its list of 100 Records That Set the World on Fire (While No One Was Listening).

== Students ==
Among his notable students are Jorge Antunes, Mario Bertoncini, Konrad Boehmer, Karl Gottfried Brunotte, Miguel Ángel Coria, Johannes Fritsch, Annea Lockwood, Luca Lombardi, Tomás Marco, Pierre Mariétan, Zoltán Pongrácz, Kees van Prooijen, Atli Heimir Sveinsson, Claude Vivier and Jan Vriend. (Note: See: List of music students by teacher: K to M#Gottfried Michael Koenig.)
