= Werner Meyer-Eppler =

German physicist

Werner Meyer-Eppler (30 April 1913 – 8 July 1960), was a Belgian-born German physicist, experimental acoustician, phoneticist and information theorist.

Meyer-Eppler was born in Antwerp. He studied mathematics, physics, and chemistry, first at the University of Cologne and then in Bonn, from 1936 until 1939, when he received a doctorate in Physics. From 1942 to 1945 he was a scientific assistant at the Physics Institute of the University of Bonn. From the time of his habilitation on 16 September 1942, he was also Lecturer in Experimental Physics. After the end of the war, Meyer-Eppler turned attention increasingly to phonetics and speech synthesis. In 1947 he was recruited by Paul Menzerath to the faculty of the Phonetic Institute of the University of Bonn, where he became Scientific Assistant on 1 April 1949. During this time, Meyer-Eppler published essays on synthetic language production and presented American inventions like the Coder, the Vocoder, the Visible Speech Machine. He contributed to the development of the electrolarynx, which is still used today for the speech-impaired.

In 1949, Meyer-Eppler published a book promoting the idea of producing music by purely electronic means, and in 1951 joined the sound engineer/composer Robert Beyer and the composer/musicologist/journalist Herbert Eimert in a successful proposal to the Nordwestdeutscher Rundfunk (NWDR) for the establishment of an electronic-music studio in Cologne. After two years of work, it was officially opened with a broadcast lecture-concert on 26 May 1953, and was to become the most important such studio in Europe.

In 1952, Meyer-Eppler habilitated for the second time, which qualified him for a professorship in phonetics and communication research. At the end of 1957 he was appointed successor to Professor Menzerath, who had died in 1954. During these years he published and lectured frequently on the subject of electronic music, introducing the term “aleatoric” with respect to concepts of statistical shaping of sounds based on his studies of phonology. Amongst his students at the University of Bonn in 1954–56 was the composer Karlheinz Stockhausen, who was also working as an assistant in the Cologne electronic music studio, and whose compositions did the most to propagate Meyer-Eppler’s ideas.

In 1959, Meyer-Eppler published his most important work. He died suddenly in Bonn of a kidney ailment from which he had been suffering for many years.

== See also ==
- Ring modulator
