= Nordwestdeutscher Rundfunk =

Defunct German public broadcasting organization

- Country: Germany
- Broadcast area: Hamburg, Lower Saxony, Schleswig-Holstein, North Rhine-Westphalia
- Headquarters: West Berlin, Germany

History
- Launched: 22 September 1945; 80 years ago
- Closed: 31 December 1955; 70 years ago (10 years, 100 days)
- Replaced by: NDR and WDR

Nordwestdeutscher Rundfunk (NWDR; Northwest German Broadcasting) was the organization responsible for public broadcasting in the German Federal States of Hamburg, Lower Saxony, Schleswig-Holstein and North Rhine-Westphalia from 22 September 1945 to 31 December 1955. Until 1954, it was also responsible for broadcasting in West Berlin. NWDR was a founder member of the consortium of public-law broadcasting institutions of the Federal Republic of Germany, the ARD.

On 1 January 1956, NWDR was succeeded by Norddeutscher Rundfunk (NDR) and Westdeutscher Rundfunk (WDR).

== History ==
=== Pre-war ===
Broadcasting in what was to become NWDR's post-war transmission area was initiated in the early 1920s:

- On 2 May 1924, Nordische Rundfunk AG (NORAG) began broadcasting from Hamburg; the company was renamed Norddeutsche Rundfunk GmbH in November 1932.
- On 10 October 1924, Westdeutsche Funkstunde AG (WEFAG) began broadcasting from Münster; the company was renamed Westdeutsche Rundfunk AG (WERAG) in 1926 and moved its base of operations to Cologne.
- Both of these stations contributed programming to the national Reichs-Rundfunk-Gesellschaft (RRG), founded on 15 May 1925, in which the Deutsche Reichspost (post office) became the principal shareholder in 1926.
- In 1933 the RRG was fully nationalized by the Nazi government and from 1 April 1934 the two stations broadcast as, respectively, the Reichssender Hamburg and the Reichssender Köln.

=== Reichssender Hamburg ===
From 1934 the north German station operated, under the name of Reichssender Hamburg, as an integral part of the national broadcasting organization RRG – now controlled by Joseph Goebbels's Reich Ministry of Public Enlightenment and Propaganda and known from 1 January 1939 as Großdeutscher Rundfunk.

Externally, the Reichssender Hamburg transmitted propaganda material to listeners overseas – in particular to those living in the British Isles – and, during World War II, broadcast regular programming aimed at sapping the morale of the civilian population of the United Kingdom. Its most famous wartime broadcaster in English was William Joyce (popularly known, from his accent and speaking-manner, as "Lord Haw-Haw").

The Reichssender Hamburg was the last short-wave station to remain on the air in wartime Germany. Its substation in Flensburg, known as the Reichssender Flensburg, broadcast the last announcements from the headquarters of the German army, OKW, over local cable radio and announced the death of Adolf Hitler to the German people on 1 May 1945.

=== Post-war ===
All radio broadcasting ceased at the end of World War II and implementation of the Allied occupation of Germany.

In the British Zone of occupation, the military authorities quickly established a station known as "Radio Hamburg" to provide information to the population of the area. On 4 May 1945, transmission started with the announcement: "This is Radio Hamburg, a station of the Allied Military Government". The British Control Commission appointed Hugh Carleton Greene, on secondment from the BBC, to manage the creation of public service broadcasting in their Zone. On 22 September 1945, Radio Hamburg became Nordwestdeutscher Rundfunk (NWDR), the single broadcasting organisation of the British Zone. The army unit allocated to run the station was part of REME Royal Electrical and Mechanical Engineers and its commander was Lt Col Paul Archibald Findlay.

=== Infiltration by the secret service ===
The forerunner organization of the Federal Intelligence Service, the Gehlen Organization, infiltrated several agents into the NWDR during the Cold War in order to keep alleged enemies of the state in the station under control. One of these agents was August Hoppe, editor from 1948 and later deputy editor-in-chief. According to documents from the BND archive, the NWDR was classified as a "threat to the development of a healthy Western democracy" at the time. Half of the top management was very open to Moscow, especially the general director Adolf Grimme and the reporter Peter von Zahn.

=== Split ===
In February 1955, the Länder of the NWDR's area decided to look again at the regulation of broadcasting. North Rhine-Westphalia decided to establish its own broadcaster, whilst Hamburg, Lower Saxony, Schleswig-Holstein continued with the existing system. To this end, the NWDR was split into two broadcasters - Norddeutscher Rundfunk (NDR) in the north and Westdeutscher Rundfunk (WDR) in North Rhine-Westphalia.

NDR continued to operate out of Hamburg, whilst the WDR was established in Cologne. The split was effective from 1 January 1956, although the station NWDR1 remained a joint operation with regional opt-outs.

The NWDR television service also remained a joint operation, from 1 April 1956 under the name Nord- und Westdeutscher Rundfunkverband (North and West German Broadcasting Federation - NWRV). The NDR and the WDR launched separate television services for their area in 1961.

== Stations ==
In 1955, the NWDR had three radio stations:

- NWDR1 – a station for the whole NWDR area, broadcast over FM and mediumwave.
- NWDR2 (or NWDR North) – a regional station on FM for north Germany, broadcast from Hamburg.
- NWDR3 (or NWDR West) – a regional program on FM for North Rhine-Westphalia, broadcast from Cologne.

NWDR was also the most active participant in ARD's Das Erste, the joint German public television service.

== See also ==
- NDR Chor
- NDR Elbphilharmonie Orchestra
- NDR Radiophilharmonie
