= Fresco (Stockhausen) =

1969 orchestral composition by Karlheinz Stockhausen

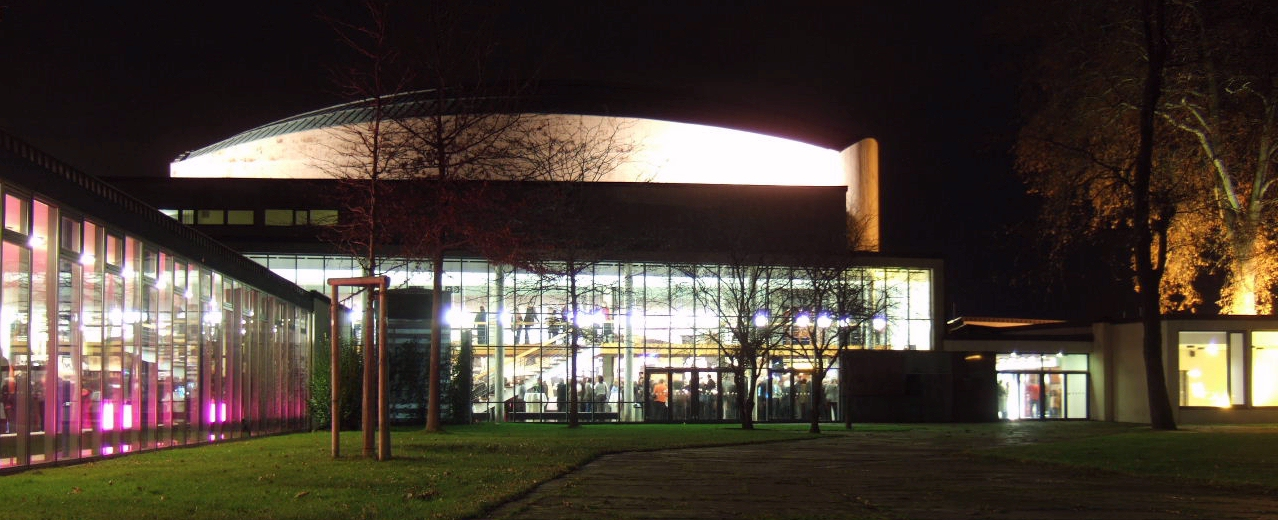
Beethovenhalle, Bonn

Fresco ("wall sounds for meditation") is an orchestral composition written in 1969 by the German composer Karlheinz Stockhausen as foyer music for an evening-long retrospective programme of his music presented simultaneously in three auditoriums of the Beethovenhalle in Bonn. It is Nr. 29 in his catalogue of works, and a performance takes about five hours.

== History ==
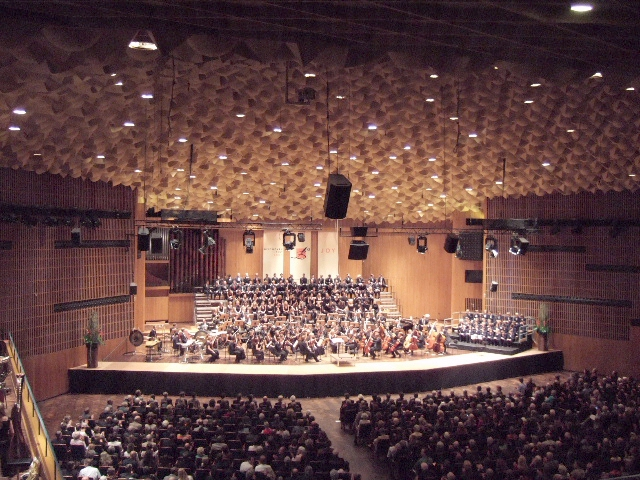
Großer Saal of the Beethovenhalle

In October 1968 Volker Wangenheim, Generalmusikdirektor (GMD) for Bonn, offered Stockhausen all of the rooms of the Beethovenhalle in Bonn for an evening concert of his music. In addition, he suggested that Stockhausen might consider writing a new piece for the Bonn Orchestra, though he could offer only three rehearsals, and warned that Bonn did not have much money for expenses. Wangenheim also wrote that he had heard about Stockhausen's Ensemble and Musik für ein Haus projects at Darmstadt in 1967 and 1968, implying that he hoped for something along the same lines. Stockhausen proposed an evening-long programme of his music to be performed simultaneously in all three auditoriums of the building. At the same time, there would be a new work played at four places in the foyer and lasting four-and-a-half hours. This work was composed in the Fall of 1969 for the Orchestra of the Beethovenhalle Bonn, and was titled Fresco, Wall Sounds for Meditation. The world premiere took place on 15 November 1969, with Volker Wangenheim conducting Orchestra I (winds and percussion) in the cloakroom foyer at the main entrance of the Großer Saal, Volkmar Fritsche conducting Orchestra II (strings) on the "bridge" in the foyer of the Großer Saal, Bernhard Kontarsky conducting Orchestra III (winds and strings) in the exhibition space by the inner courtyard, and Georg Földes conducting Orchestra IV (strings) in the small cloakroom foyer in front of the Studio auditorium.

=== Musik für die Beethovenhalle ===
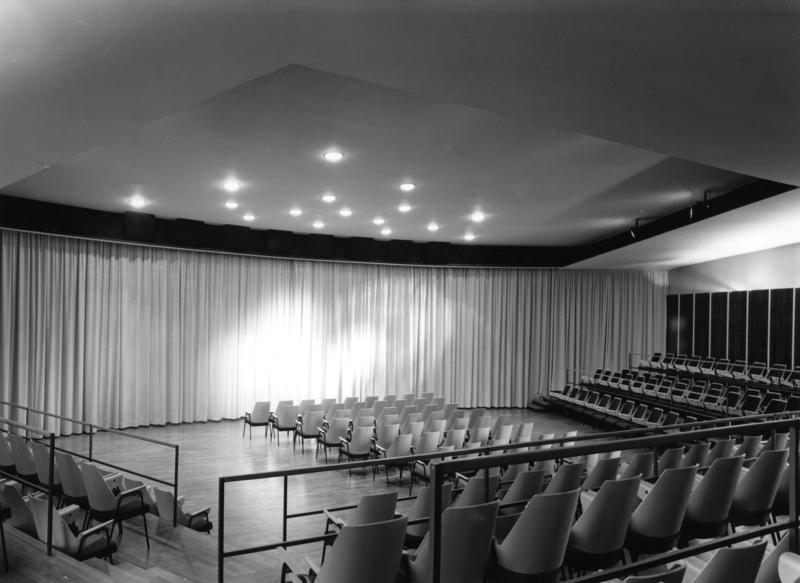
Studio auditorium of the Beethovenhalle

The larger project into which Fresco was incorporated was called "Music for the Beethoven Hall", and was described in the programme book as "3 × 4 hours of non-stop programmes simultaneously / in 3 halls and the foyers of the Beethovenhalle". The programmes in each of the three auditoriums were performed in the usual way, only the seats were removed and the audience was seated on the floor on rugs and mats. These programmes were carefully timed so that the intermissions would coincide, at which point the members of the audience were free to move to one of the other halls for the next segment. "The idea was that my music should be experienced like exhibits in a museum". Conceptually, "instead of the usual chatter, the whole house, from cloakroom to auditorium seat right up until the entrance of the conductor, could already be filled with sound, so that the listener could begin listening, if he wanted, from the moment of entry, making his own selection from a timetable placed at the entrance giving details of the three programmes to take place simultaneously in the three auditoriums":

Musik für die Beethovenhalle: time plan
	Großer Saal	Kammermusiksaal	Studio
20:00	Gesang der Jünglinge	Momente (from tape)	Kurzwellen
20:15	Kontakte		
20:50	Gruppen (from tape)		Aus den sieben Tagen: Litanei & Ankunft (poetry reading)
21:00		Klavierstück VI	Film: Eine Aufführung der Mikrophonie I
21:15	Refrain		
21:25	Carré (from tape)	Mikrophonie I (from tape)	
21:30			Prozession
21:55	Zyklus	"Gedicht für Dich" (poetry reading)	Klavierstück XI
22:05		Mikrophonie II (from tape)	"San Francisco" (poetry reading)
22:10	Hymnen with soloists		Stimmung
22:20		Klavierstücke I–IV/IX	
22:40		Mixtur (from tape)	
23:10		Klavierstücke V, VII, VIII	
23:15			Film: Momente
23:25		Spiral	
23:40		"An den der mit mir ist" (poetry reading)	
23:50		Klavierstück X	
00:05			(end)
00:10	(end)		
00:15		(end)	

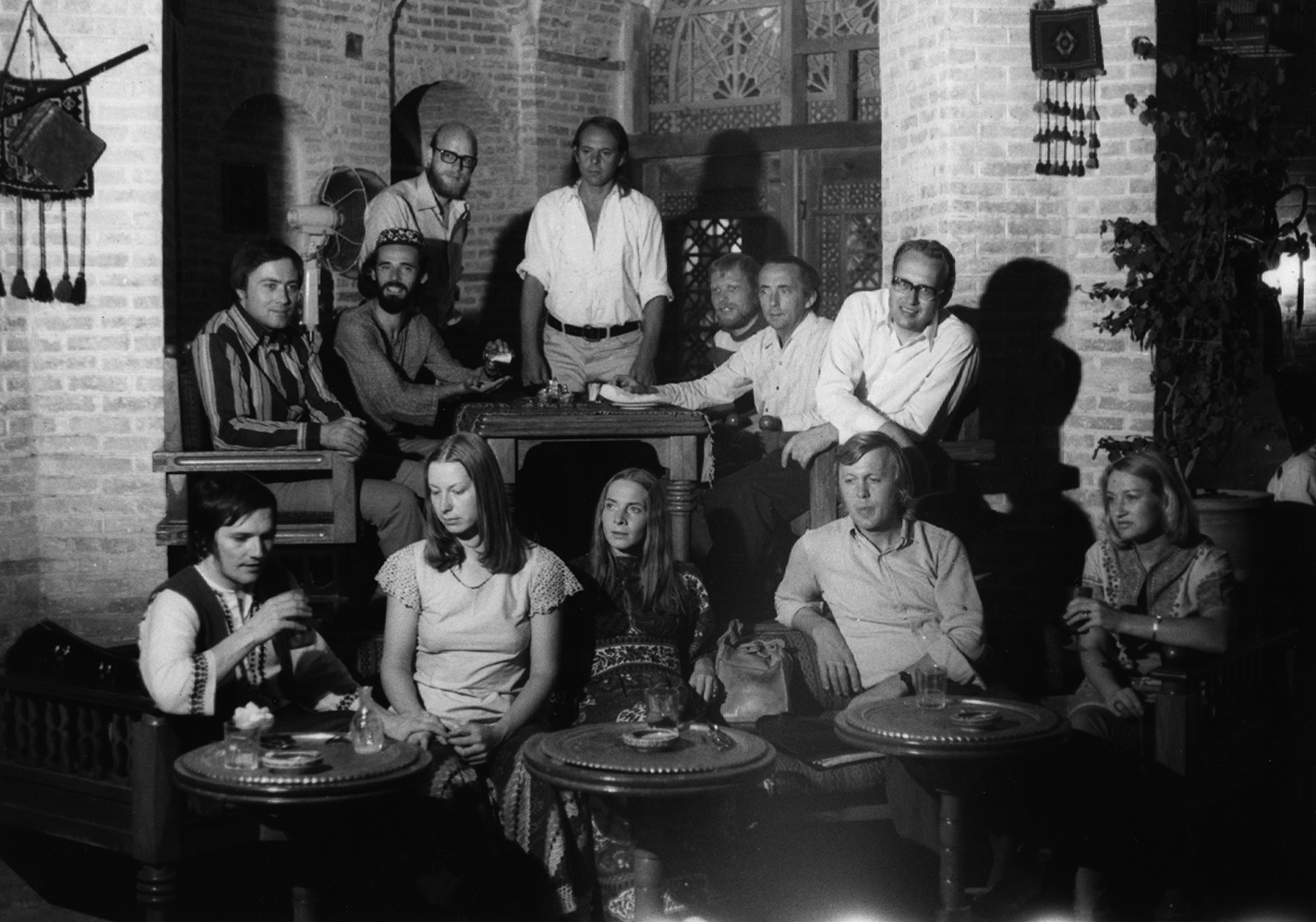
Stockhausen (back, centre) in September 1972, with several of the Beethovenhalle performers: front: P. Eötvös, 5 members of the Collegium Vocale: D. von Biel, G. Rodens, W. Fromme, H. Albrecht; second row, second from left: H.-A. Billig; and percussionist C. Caskel (for right)

Live performances were given by Alfred Alings and Rolf Gehlhaar, tamtam (Hymnen, Prozession, Kurzwellen), Harald Bojé, electronium (Klavierstück VI, Hymnen, Prozession, Kurzwellen), Christoph Caskel, percussion (Refrain, Zyklus), the Collegium Vocale Köln (Stimmung), Péter Eötvös, piano (Hymnen, Kurzwellen), Johannes Fritsch, viola (Hymnen, Prozession, Kurzwellen), Aloys Kontarksky, piano (Klavierstücke I–V, VII–XI, Kontakte, Refrain, Prozession), Gisela Kontarsky, speaker (poetry and texts written by Stockhausen), Michael Vetter, recorder with short-wave radio (Spiral), and Stockhausen himself, on celesta (Refrain), as reader of his own poem, "San Francisco", and as sound projectionist in Hymnen, Prozession, Kurzwellen, and Stimmung. Sound projectionists for the films and playback from tape were Péter Eötvös, David C. Johnson, and Mesías Maiguashca (also for Hymnen).

This type of programming, called a Wandelkonzert ("promenade concert"), had been pioneered in Germany by Stockhausen in 1967 with a Darmstadt group-composition project titled Ensemble. For over a year, Stockhausen had been involved in planning the auditorium and programming for the German Pavilion at Expo '70 in Osaka, which would open on 14 March 1970. In a programme note written for the premiere of Fresco, Stockhausen described his vision for future performance spaces:

I have published articles, given lectures, and taken part in many discussions about new auditoriums, especially about the music house, which I imagine to exist in any large city: a house in which one can continually hear music, a house that consists of a whole complex of different auditoriums, which are to be used separately or simultaneously for a composition; a sonorous labyrinth of rooms, corridors, balconies, bridges, movable platforms, nests, shells, caves, 'sound storehouses', 'vibratoriums', 'sound boxes'.

In the 1970s Stockhausen would return to this Wandelkonzert idea in Sternklang and Alphabet für Liège, and much later in the final scene, Hoch-Zeiten, of the opera Sonntag aus Licht (1998–2003), as well as in his last work, the unfinished cycle of twenty-four chamber-music compositions Klang.

== Material and form ==
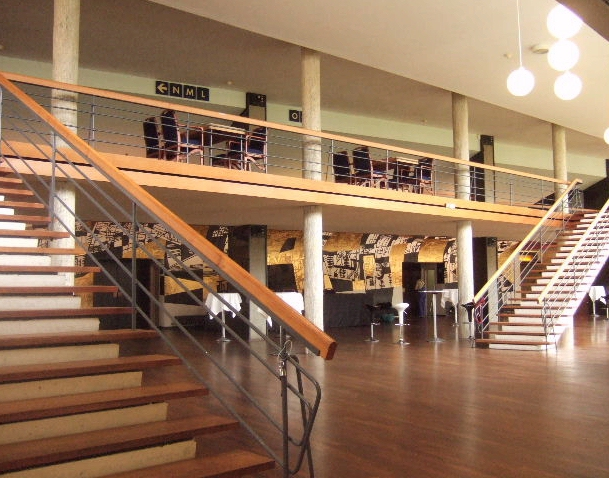
Foyer of the Beethovenhalle: Orchestra II was placed on the upper level "bridge"

The "wall sounds" of the composition's subtitle consist of slow rising and falling cluster-glissandos and scalewise progressions—slowly evolving bands and surfaces of sound that enter and depart against a background of silence. The division of the four orchestral groups into foyer spaces separated by walls and by distance makes only portions of the music audible at any one location. It is literally Wandelmusik—music for the "foyer" (Wandelgang or Wandelhalle)—and is intended as a spiritually superior form of "elevator music". By strolling (wandeln) through the space, the listeners constantly change their individual perspectives. This is the sort of music that, a few years later, Brian Eno would name "ambient music".

The glissando surfaces move independently in each of the four orchestral groups. The manner of their movement is prescribed in two ways, first according to whether they fall or rise, and secondly according to whether they become narrower or wider. The work begins with descending glissandos in all four orchestral groups. In three of these groups the glissando surfaces are progressively compressed into the low register (in processes with different lengths), while in the fourth group they widen as they descend. The direction then reverses, with a superimposion of a rising-spreading form of motion on a falling-compressing one. The development of the form continues in this way, with characteristically different forms of motion and section durations.

The orchestras were scheduled to play in overlapping segments, three per orchestra, with pauses of 30 or 40 minutes between segments.

Fresco: time plan
	Orchestra I	Orchestra II	Orchestra III	Orchestra IV
19:10		start		
19:20	start			start
19:30			start	
20:10		stop		
20:30				stop
20:50		start	stop	
21:00	stop			start
21:20			start	
21:40	start			
22:10		stop		
22:30				stop
22:40	stop	start		
23:00				start
23:10	start		stop	
23:35			start	
0:20				stop
0:25			stop	
0:30		stop		
0:40	stop			

The exact scoring is flexible. According to the score preface, the groups at the Beethovenhalle (including the conductors, who also played instruments) were arranged in rows in the following order:

- Group I: 1 tuba, 2 trombones, 2 bassoons, 3 horns, 1 percussionist (2 pedal timpani, marimba)—conductor (oboe)—2 oboes, 2 trumpets, 2 clarinets, 2 flutes, vibraphone (soft mallets)
- Group II: 2 contrabasses, 3 cellos, 4 violas—conductor (harmonium)—5 second violins, 6 first violins
- Group III: conductor (piano)—1 trombone, 2 contrabasses, 1 bassoon, 2 cellos, 2 horns, 2 violas, 1 oboe, 1 trumpet, 2 second violins, 1 clarinet, 2 first violins, 1 flute
- Group IV: 2 contrabasses, 3 cellos, 3 violas—conductor (accordion or chromatic harmonica)—4 second violins, 7 first violins

== World-premiere scandal ==
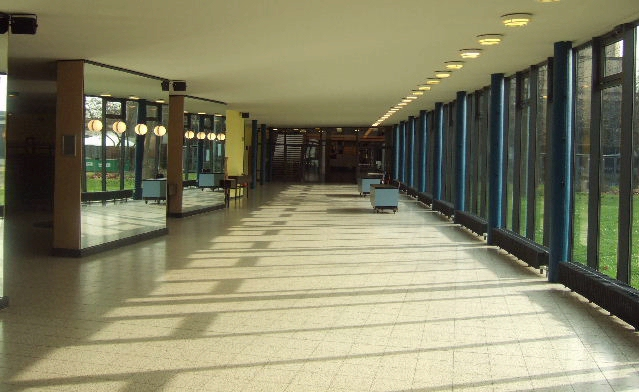
The cloakroom foyer at the main entrance: Orchestra I was positioned in a line along the windows at the right

Knowing that there would be only three rehearsals, Stockhausen had deliberately written music that would be simple enough to be sight-read. However, he greatly overestimated the good will of the Bonn orchestra, which was unaccustomed to playing contemporary music. Rebellion erupted already during the rehearsals. The Bonn musicians, "sworn bravely and honestly to their good old classics" according to the City Manager Fritz Brüse, complained they could not understand such "complex playing instructions" as to play "glissandos no faster than one octave per minute". Interpreting a Stockhausen score was clearly too much to ask from these traditionally trained musicians, who "plainly had had no time since their conservatory days to learn anything more". Still, the musicians requested Stockhausen to come for a "teach-in" at their next rehearsal and explain what he had in mind. According to one news report Stockhausen, who was preparing for an upcoming four-day festival of his music in Lebanon, declined their request—a decision described by Wangenheim as "unwise". Stockhausen's own account conflicts with this report. He reported that he was in fact present at the first rehearsal, where there was a dispute between him and some of the musicians. One objected that, "If we are not playing on the stage, then we won't get any applause," and Stockhausen conceded that this might be true. The musician retorted: "Yes, but in that case we won't play. It's absolutely out of the question! We are supposed to play for four hours. You're really crazy—and we are supposed only to make some kind of finger exercises, slow glissandos that go on for over 20 minutes? We're not a bunch of Bozos! You would be better doing this over loudspeakers!" When he explained what he wanted was "music internally animated through the concentration of the musicians", it made no difference. "They thought I meant to spoof them, in that I had given them something so simple to play that it could easily be accomplished in three rehearsals. ... They didn't understand this, and they also didn't want it. They wanted to play a piece, maybe with ten rehearsals, seven minutes long—and then quit" Some orchestra members telephoned their union to find out whether they really were obliged to play such a thing, and learned they were. The concertmaster, Ernesto Mompaey, chose to ignore this union ruling and, complaining he felt "so spiritually tormented by Mssrs. Wangenheim and Stockhausen", threatened to murder the head conductor and walked out of the rehearsal, followed by some like-minded comrades.

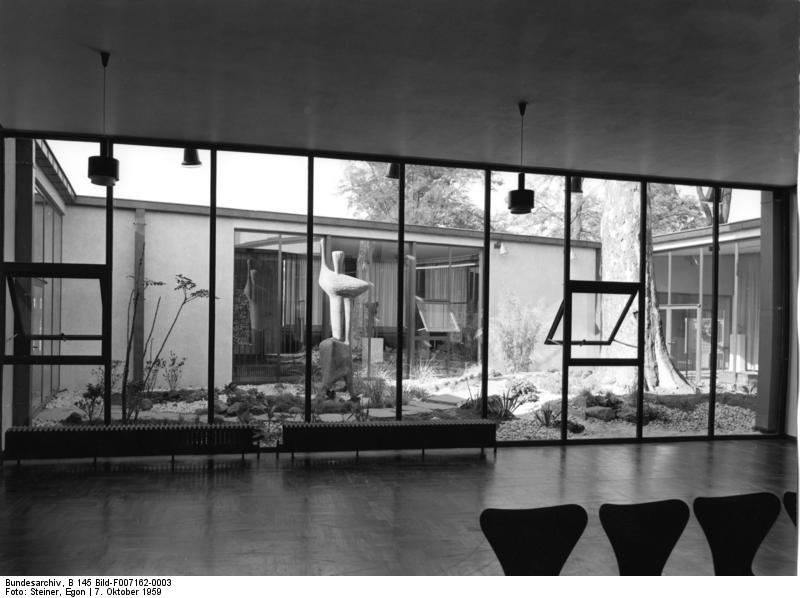
Orchestra III sat along the far wall of the exhibition space, across the inner courtyard

The remaining musicians participated in the well-attended (about two thousand listeners) performance on 15 November but many only under protest, leaving a hand-painted placard in the warm-up room reading, "We are playing, otherwise we would be fired!". As the evening progressed, things deteriorated as the four conductors lost control over their groups.

The performance of FRESCO was completely wrecked by the orchestra, whose players made a lot of crazy nonsense, got drunk during their breaks, and finally handed over their instruments to members of the audience. The whole thing ended up like a primitive student happening, whose actors were no longer really "with it"

During the performance, familiar excerpts from the standard repertoire, Rhenish folk songs, and the clatter of overturned ashtrays, beer bottles, and music stands filled the air of the foyer and corridors. Pranksters were at work, too, replacing some of the instruction sheets on the music desks with slogans like "Stockhausen Zoo. Please do not feed the animals!" Antagonists in the audience taunted the musicians, some of whom tired of the "monkeyshines" and went home after only an hour had gone by. Shortly after, another prankster switched off the stand lights, leaving the remaining musicians in the dark. The whole thing ground to a halt after 260 minutes. Apart from the hecklers, some of the mainly young listeners in the audience (many of whom were schoolchildren) were not experienced in concert etiquette and made so much noise that Stockhausen and the performers frequently had to ask for quiet. The really remarkable thing, according to the composer, was that so few of the children misbehaved in this way.

== Contemporary performance ==
Fresco was performed during a festival called Expozice nové hudby (Exposition of New Music) in Brno, Czech Republic in October 19, 2024 from 17:00 to 22:00 at Besední dům concert hall.
