= Composer tributes (classical music) =

Musical tributes or homages from one composer to another can take many forms. Following are examples of the major types of tributes occurring in classical music. A particular work may fit into more than one of these types.

== Variations ==
Variations on a theme by another composer. These are usually written as discrete sets of variations. There are hundreds of examples, including:

- Ludwig van Beethoven's Diabelli Variations
- Johannes Brahms's Variations on a Theme by Haydn (which theme was probably not written by Haydn at all)

== Works with other titles ==
Many works are based on a theme or themes by another composer (sometimes anonymous or traditional). They range from short pieces to extended major compositions. Sometimes these works are no more than sets of variations under another name, but sometimes they go beyond that. They appear under many titles, including:

- Works ending in -ana, such as:
  - Pyotr Ilyich Tchaikovsky's tribute to Wolfgang Amadeus Mozart by subtitling his Orchestral Suite No. 4 Mozartiana
  - Ottorino Respighi's tribute to Gioachino Rossini, titled Rossiniana
  - Robert Gerhard's hommage to Felip Pedrell, titled Pedrelliana
  - Manuel de Falla's Pedrelliana, to Pedrell too, fourth part of his Hommages suite
  - Joaquín Rodrigo's Soleriana (1953), on eight pieces by Antoni Soler
  - Carles Surinyach's Soleriana (1972), also on Antoni Soler
- Fantasia or Fantasy
  - Ralph Vaughan Williams's Fantasia on a Theme by Thomas Tallis
  - Franz Liszt's Fantasy on Themes from Mozart's Marriage of Figaro and Don Giovanni
  - Joaquín Rodrigo's Fantasía para un gentilhombre on themes from Gaspar Sanz's Instrucción de música sobre la Guitarra Española.
- Hommage
  - Carlos Chávez's Estudio IV: homenaje a Chopin, for piano (1949)
  - the second piece from Claude Debussy's piano suite Images is Hommage à Rameau
  - Lorenzo Ferrero's Thema 44 (ad honorem J. Haydn) for small orchestra
  - Manuel de Falla's Hommages for orchestra (1938–1939), four pieces devoted to Enrique Fernández Arbós, Claude Debussy, Paul Dukas and Felip Pedrell.
  - Robert Gerhard's Symphony Hommage to Pedrell
  - Edvard Grieg's Study (Hommage à Chopin), from Moods, Op. 73
  - György Kurtág
    - ...a Százévesnek – Hommage à Takács Jenő, for small string orchestra (2002)
    - Hommage à András Mihály, Op. 13, for string quartet (1977–78)
    - Hommage à Jacob Obrecht, for string quartet (2004–2005)
    - Hommage à R. Sch., for clarinet (and bass drum), viola, and piano (1990)
    - Looking Back: Old and New for Four Players, Hommage à Stockhausen, for trumpet, double-bass, and keyboard instruments (1993)
    - Négy initium az Hommage à Jacob Obrecht-ből, for viola and cello (2005)
    - Petite musique solennelle – En hommage à Pierre Boulez 90, for orchestra (2015)
  - Alexandre Tansman's Hommage à Chopin (for guitar)
  - Heitor Villa-Lobos's Hommage à Chopin for piano solo
- Paraphrase
  - Liszt's Paraphrase on the "Dies Irae", which he called Totentanz
- Rhapsody
  - Sergei Rachmaninoff's Rhapsody on a Theme of Paganini (the most famous of the many works based on Niccolò Paganini's Caprice No. 24 in A minor for solo violin)
- Reminiscences
  - Liszt's Réminiscences de Don Juan (based on themes from Mozart's opera Don Giovanni)
- Tombeau
  - Maurice Ravel's Le tombeau de Couperin
  - Manuel de Falla's Le Tombeau de Debussy
  - Arthur Benjamin's Le Tombeau de Ravel

== Use of composer's name or an associated name ==
Examples of the use of a composer's name as the title of a work include:

- Nicolas Isouard's opera Cimarosa (1808), after the eponymous composer
- Albert Lortzing's singspiel Szenen aus Mozarts Leben (1832), on Mozart's life
- Robert Schumann named two sections of his piano work Carnaval after Paganini and Chopin
- Alessandro Stradella's life was the basis for some operas with the title Stradella by Louis Niedermeyer (1837), César Franck (1841) and Friedrich von Flotow's Alessandro Stradella (1844)
- Emilio Arrieta's opera Pergolesi (1851), after this composer
- Johann Joseph Abert's opera Astorga (1866), a fictional work based on Emanuele d'Astorga's life
- Joachim Raff's opera Benedetto Marcello (1878, after the eponymous composer)
- Nikolai Rimsky-Korsakov's opera Mozart and Salieri (1897) was based on fictional events supposedly involving Mozart and Antonio Salieri
- Stanislao Falchi's opera Tartini. o Il trillo del Diavolo (1899), about Giuseppe Tartini
- Giacomo Orefice's opera Chopin (1901), a fictional treatment of the life of Frédéric Chopin, in which the arias were based on themes from that composer's piano works
- Hans Pfitzner's opera Palestrina (1917), depicting episodes in the life of Giovanni Pierluigi da Palestrina
- Franz Lehár's operetta Paganini (1925), a fictional treatment of Paganini's life
- Bernhard Paumgartner's opera Rossini in Neapel (1936) on Gioacchino Rossini
- Sir Peter Maxwell Davies's opera Taverner (1972), on John Taverner's life
- Alfred Schnittke's opera Gesualdo (1995), based on Carlo Gesualdo's life.

Sometimes the name of something strongly associated with the composer is used as the title of a work:

- Sergei Lyapunov named a symphonic poem written in tribute to Chopin after that composer's birthplace Żelazowa Wola
- Emil Ábrányi's opera A Tamás-templom karnagya (The cantor of Saint Thomas) (1947), on Johann Sebastian Bach, referring to him by the church where he worked.

== Transcription or adaptation ==
Transcriptions or adaptations of existing works for other forces, such as:

- Maurice Ravel's orchestration of Modest Mussorgsky's piano work Pictures at an Exhibition
- Franz Liszt's transcription for solo piano or two pianos of the nine symphonies of Beethoven
- Robert Wright and George Forrest's arrangements of the works of classical composers as songs for musicals (the best known are Kismet, based on Alexander Borodin; and Song of Norway, based on Grieg)

== Quotation ==
Quotation of a theme or themes by another composer. Many examples, including:

- Richard Strauss quoted the funeral march from Beethoven's Eroica Symphony (No. 3) in his Metamorphosen for 23 solo strings
- Igor Stravinsky quoted a theme from Franz Schubert's Marche Militaire No. 1 in D in his Circus Polka

== Transformation ==
Transformation of completed works, such as:

- Charles Gounod took the melody line from Bach's Prelude No. 1 in C major from Book I of The Well-Tempered Clavier, and added his own harmonies, setting it to the words of the prayer Hail Mary (in Latin, Ave Maria). His setting was called Ave Maria
- Grieg added an additional part for a second piano to existing solo piano sonatas by Mozart

== Synthesis ==
Synthesis of fragmentary notes into a conjectural whole, such as:

- Luciano Berio's Rendering (1989) embeds fragments of an unfinished symphony by Franz Schubert
- Anthony Payne's elaboration of Edward Elgar's notes for his Third Symphony (which he does not pretend is necessarily what Elgar would have written had he had the opportunity)
- Charles Wuorinen's A Reliquary for Igor Stravinsky (1975) incorporates sketch fragments by Igor Stravinsky

== Completion ==
Completion of substantially written but unfinished works, such as:

- Franz Xaver Süssmayr completing Mozart's Requiem in accordance with the outline sketched by the composer
- Franco Alfano completing Giacomo Puccini's opera Turandot
- Deryck Cooke's completion of Gustav Mahler's Tenth Symphony

== Imitation ==
Imitation, where a composer deliberately copies the compositional style of an earlier composer, such as:

- Siegfried Ochs wrote a set of 14 Humorous Variations on the German Volkslied "Kommt ein Vogel geflogen", in which each variation was in the style of a different composer (they included Bach, Haydn, Mozart, Beethoven and Wagner)
- Sergei Prokofiev imitated Joseph Haydn in his Symphony No. 1 in D Classical
- Maurice Ravel composed two piano pieces in 1913, titled A la manière de … Borodine, and A la manière de … Chabrier
- Heitor Villa-Lobos wrote a series of works called Bachianas Brasileiras, imitating the style of Bach
- Tchaikovsky wrote imitative piano pieces called Un poco di Schumann and Un poco di Chopin in his 18 Morceaux, Op. 72; also his Album des enfants, Op. 39, was subtitled 24 Children's Pieces à la Schumann

== Dedication ==
Dedication of a work to another composer or performer:

- Pierre Boulez's Rituel in memoriam Bruno Maderna
- Anton Bruckner's Symphony No. 3 is dedicated to Richard Wagner
- George Enescu's Octet for strings, Op. 7 (1900), is dedicated to André Gedalge
- York Höller
  - Mythos (1979–80) is dedicated to Hans Zender
  - Schwarze Halbinseln (1982) is dedicated to Karlheinz Stockhausen
  - Topic (1967) is dedicated to Bernd Alois Zimmermann
- The Messa per Rossini, a collaborative work by 13 composers spearheaded by Giuseppe Verdi, in a tribute to Rossini
- Aram Khachaturian's Violin Concerto is dedicated to David Oistrakh
- Witold Lutosławski's Musique funèbre "à la mémoire de Béla Bartók"
- Arvo Pärt's Cantus in Memoriam Benjamin Britten
- Wolfgang Rihm's Sub-Kontur (1974–75) is dedicated to Karlheinz Stockhausen
- Karlheinz Stockhausen
  - Gruppen for three orchestras, Nr. 6 (1955–57) is dedicated to Herbert Eimert
  - The four Regions of Hymnen are dedicated to Pierre Boulez, Henri Pousseur, John Cage, and Luciano Berio
  - The reduced-orchestra version of Mixtur, Nr. 16½ (1967) is dedicated to Ladislav Kupkovič
  - Pole for two performers, Nr. 30 (1970) is dedicated to Harald Bojé and Péter Eötvös
  - Spiral, Nr. 29 (1969) is dedicated to the six singers of the Collegium Vocale Köln (Dagmar Apel, Gaby Rodens, Helga Albrecht, Wolfgang Fromme, Siegfried Bernhöft, and Hans Alderich Billig), and David C. Johnson, Michael Vetter, Edward Tarr, Karlheinz Böttner, Christoph Caskel, Michael Ranta, Rolf Gehlhaar, Harald Bojé, Peter Eötvös, Gérard Frémy, Aloys Kontarsky, Johannes Fritsch, and Mesías Maiguashca
- Igor Stravinsky's Symphonies of Wind Instruments (1920) is dedicated to the memory of Claude Debussy
- Ralph Vaughan Williams' Symphony No. 5 is dedicated to Jean Sibelius.

== Cryptogram ==
Musical cryptograms, where the composer’s name is encoded in musical letters. The most famous example of this is the BACH motif, which has been used by over 400 composers in tribute to Johann Sebastian Bach (Bach himself used it more than once in his own works). Other examples include:

- Ravel's Menuet sur le nom d'Haydn
- Arnold Bax's Variations on the name Gabriel Fauré for harp and strings
- the DSCH motif, depicting Dmitri Shostakovich; it has been used by various other composers in tribute to him.
