= Prozession =

Prozession (Procession), for tamtam, viola, electronium, piano, microphones, filters, and potentiometers (six performers), is a composition by Karlheinz Stockhausen, written in 1967. It is Number 23 in the catalogue of the composer's works.

== Conception ==
Prozession is one of a series of works dating from the 1960s which Stockhausen designated as "process" compositions. These works in effect separate the "form" from the "content" by presenting the performers with a series of transformation signs which are to be applied to material that may vary considerably from one performance to the next. In Prozession, the performers choose material from specific earlier compositions by Stockhausen. In the subsequent companion works, Kurzwellen for six performers, Spiral for a soloist, Pole for two, and Expo for three, this material is to be drawn spontaneously during the performance from short-wave radio broadcasts. The processes, indicated primarily by plus, minus, and equal signs, constitute the composition and, despite the unpredictability of the materials, these processes can be heard from one performance to another as being "the same".

== History ==
Prozession was begun during a train journey to Basel in May 1967. and was written for and dedicated to the ensemble with which Stockhausen was regularly touring at that time: Alfred Alings and Rolf Gehlhaar (tamtam with hand-held microphone), Johannes Fritsch (viola), Harald Bojé (electronium), and Aloys Kontarsky (piano). Two performers are required for the tamtam: The world premiere was given by this ensemble in Helsinki on 21 May 1967, with subsequent performances in Stockholm, Oslo, at the Bergen Festival, in Copenhagen, London, and finally on 26 August 1967 at the Darmstädter Ferienkurse. Three performances were recorded in Darmstadt a few days later, and one was chosen for release on disc. Earlier recordings had been made for radio broadcast, during rehearsals at the WDR in Cologne, on 9 and 10 May 1967. In addition to recordings, over the scourse of three years this same ensemble performed Prozession approximately twenty-eight times.

== Structure and technique ==
Prozession consists of a sequence of 250 events in each of the four parts. There is no written score. Stockhausen explained that in pieces like this, "the first step is always that of imitating something and the next step is that of transforming what you're able to imitate". The tamtam players choose material from Mikrophonie I, the viola from Gesang der Jünglinge, Kontakte, and Momente, the electronium from Telemusik, and the piano from the Klavierstücke I–XI and Kontakte.

Each plus, minus, or equal sign indicates that, upon repetition of an event, the performer is to increase, decrease, or maintain the same level in one of four musical dimensions (or "parameters"): overall duration of the event, number of internal subdivisions, dynamic level, or pitch register/range. It is up to the performer to decide which of these dimensions is to be affected, except that vertically stacked signs must be applied to different parameters. Despite this indeterminacy, a large number of plus signs (for example) will result in successive events becoming longer, more finely subdivided, louder, and either higher or wider in range; a large number of minus signs will produce the reverse effect. In this way, a continuing process of changes is controlled, and the work's title is taken from this concept at its core: German Prozeß = "process", Prozess-ion, though of course it also means "procession" in the sense of a ceremonial parade or enfilade.

== Discography ==
- Stockhausen, Karlheinz. Prozession. Christoph Caskel, Joachim Krist, Péter Eötvös, Harald Bojé, Aloys Kontarsky, Karlheinz Stockhausen (recorded 1971). LP recording. DG 2530582. Hamburg: Deutsche Grammophon. Reissued on CD, together with Stockhausen's Ceylon (from Für Kommende Zeiten). Stockhausen Complete Edition CD 11. Kürten: Stockhausen-Verlag, 199?.
- Stockhausen, Karlheinz. Prozession. Alfred Alings, Rolf Gehlhaar, Johannes Fritsch, Aloys Kontarsky, Karlheinz Stockhausen. LP recording. Vox STGBY 615. New York: Vox Records. Also issued on Vox Candide 31 001 CE; CBS S 77230 (2-LP set, with Mikrophonie I and Mikrophonie II); Varese International VC81008. Excerpt issued on CD accompanying Hopp 1998.
- La Musica Moderna 98. Alfred Alings, Rolf Gehlhaar, Johannes Fritsch, Aloys Kontarsky, Karlheinz Stockhausen (a different take from the same recording sessions as the one issued on Vox STGBY 615). LP recording. Vox Fratelli Fabbri Editiori mm-1098.
- Stockhausen, Karlheinz. Prozession. Kazimieras Jušinskas, Monika Kiknadzė, Simonas Kaupinis, Deimantas Balys, Domantas Razmus, Kristupas Gikas, Kristupas Kmitas (recorded 2019). Digital album (streaming + download). NoBusiness NBCC 11. Vilnius: NoBusiness Records, 2022.
