= Caskel =

Caskel is a surname. Notable people with the surname include:

- Christoph Caskel (1932–2023), German percussionist and teacher
- Werner Caskel (1896–1970), German historian
