= Expo (Stockhausen) =

Stockhausen's Expo was written for the blue spherical auditorium (out-of-view at the right of this picture) of the German Pavilion at Expo '70

Expo, for three performers with shortwave radio receivers and a sound projectionist, is a composition by Karlheinz Stockhausen, written in 1969–70. It is Number 31 in the catalogue of the composer's works.

== Conception ==
Expo is the penultimate in a series of works dating from the late 1960s which Stockhausen designated as "process" compositions. These works in effect separate the "form" from the "content" by presenting the performers with a series of transformation signs which are to be applied to material that may vary considerably from one performance to the next. In Expo and three companion works (Kurzwellen for six performers, Spiral for a soloist, and Pole for two), this material is to be drawn spontaneously during the performance from short-wave radio broadcasts. The processes, indicated primarily by plus, minus, and equal signs, constitute the composition and, despite the unpredictability of the materials, these processes can be heard from one performance to another as being "the same".

Each plus, minus, or equal sign indicates that, upon repetition of an event, the performer is to increase, decrease, or maintain the same level in one of four musical dimensions (or "parameters"): overall duration of the event, number of internal subdivisions, dynamic level, or pitch register/range. It is up to the performer to decide which of these dimensions is to be affected, except that vertically stacked signs must be applied to different parameters. Despite this indeterminacy, a large number of plus signs (for example) will result in successive events becoming longer, more finely subdivided, louder, and either higher or wider in range; a large number of minus signs will produce the reverse effect. To the signs previously used in Prozession, Kurzwellen, and Spiral Stockhausen adds some new ones.

== History ==
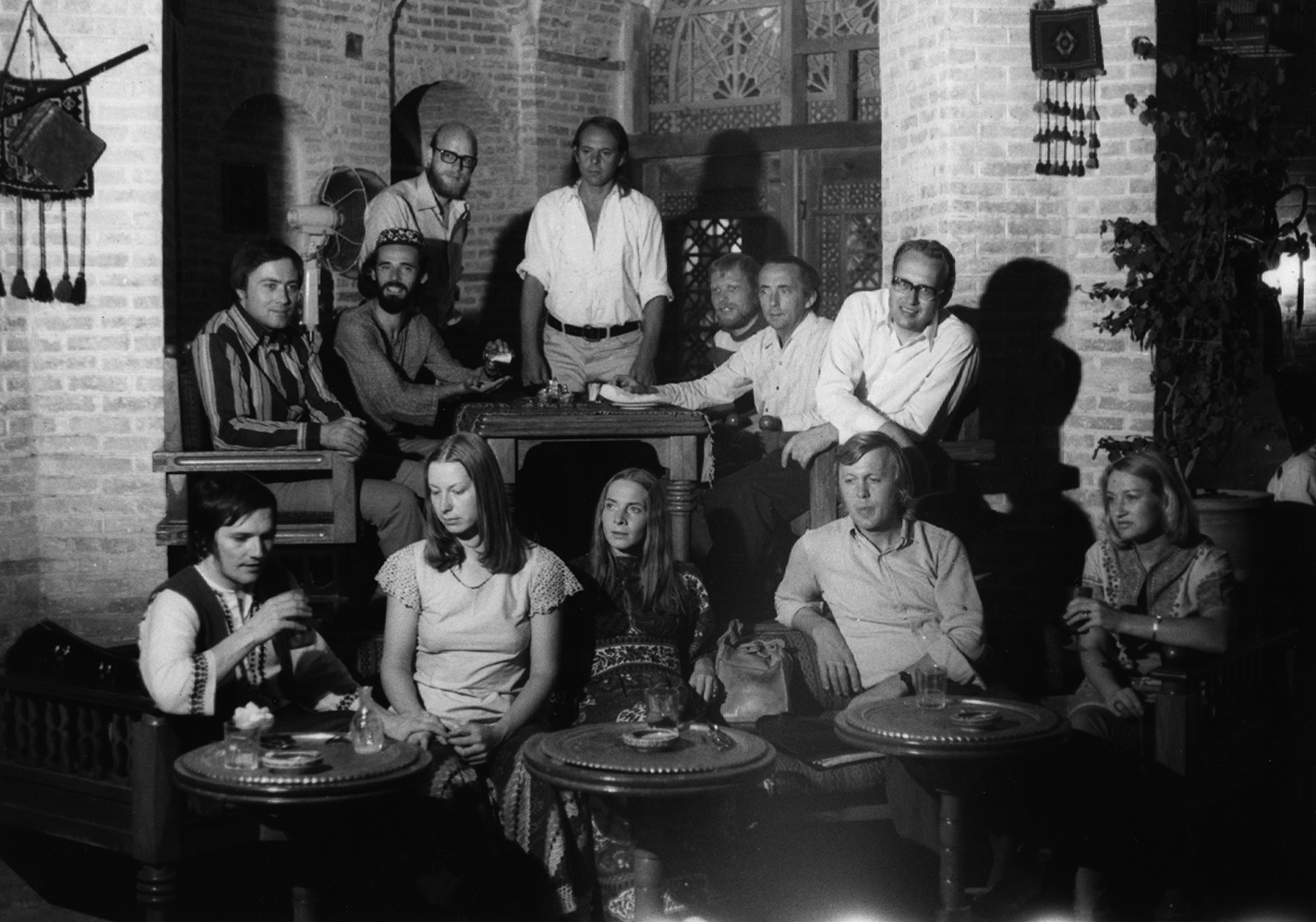
Stockhausen (back, centre) at the Shiraz Arts Festival, September 1972, with several of the Expo '70 performers: front: P. Eötvös, D. von Biel, G. Rodens, W. Fromme, H. Albrecht; second row, second from left: H.-A. Billig; far right: C. Caskel

In 1968 the West German World Fair Committee invited Stockhausen to collaborate on the German Pavilion at the 1970 World Fair in Osaka, Japan. Other collaborators on the project included the pavilion's architect, Fritz Bornemann, Fritz Winckel, director of the Electronic Music Studio at Technische Universität Berlin, and engineer Max Mengeringhausen. The pavilion theme was "gardens of music", in keeping with which Bornemann intended "planting" the exhibition halls beneath a broad lawn, with a connected auditorium "sprouting" above ground. Initially, Bornemann conceived this auditorium in the form of an amphitheatre, with a central orchestra podium and surrounding audience space. In the summer of 1968, Stockhausen met with Bornemann and persuaded him to change this conception to a spherical space with the audience in the center, surrounded by loudspeaker groups in seven rings at different "latitudes" around the interior walls of the sphere. In addition, Stockhausen would participate by presenting daily five-hour programs of his music. Stockhausen's works were performed for 5½ hours every day over a period of 183 days to a total audience of about a million listeners. Expo was written, as the title indicates, for these performances and was composed in Kürten in December 1969 and January 1970, at that time under the working title of Trio. Between 14 March and 14 September 1970, Expo was played and sung many times at the German Pavilion at Expo '70, in daily performances by twenty different musicians including the composer. The English group Intermodulation (Roger Smalley, Tim Souster, Peter Britton, and Robin Thompson) performed it a number of times and made recordings for the radio.

== Structure and technique ==
Expo is a more relaxed and cheerful piece than its companions, and features an unusual degree of synchronised gestures and canonic imitation. It consists of a sequence of approximately 135 events, grouped into two large sections divided in the score by wavy barlines, each interrupted once by an insert lasting up to 2½ minutes. One of these inserts is slow, the other fast; both are characterised by a synchronised periodic beat. Stockhausen explained that in pieces like this, "the first step is always that of imitating something and the next step is that of transforming what you're able to imitate" .

== Discography ==
- Karlheinz Stockhausen: Expo für 3 (Integrale Version in zwei Fassungen). Michael Vetter (voice, recorder, and short-wave radio), Natascha Nikeprelevic (voice and short-wave radio), F. X. Randomiz (lap-top computer system, voice, and short-wave radio). Recorded 12 October 2013 at Sound Studio N, Cologne. CD recording, 1 disc: digital, 12 cm, stereo. Stockhausen Complete Edition CD 104. Kürten: Stockhausen-Verlag, 2014.
