= Process music =

Music that arises from a process

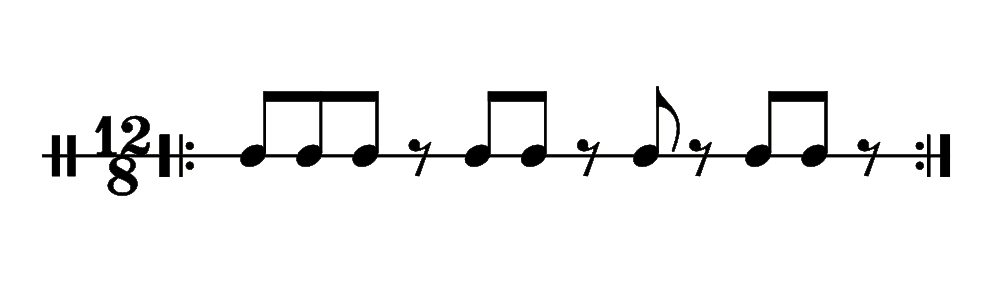
Basic rhythm from Clapping Music by Steve Reich, which is played against itself. First in rhythmic unison, then with one part moved ahead by an eighth note, then another, and so on, till they are back together—an example of Nyman's process-type 4. First two patterns, abbreviated

Process music is music that arises from a process. It may make that process audible to the listener, or the process may be concealed.

Primarily begun in the 1960s, diverse composers have employed divergent methods and styles of process. "A 'musical process' as Christensen defines it is a highly complex dynamic phenomenon involving audible structures that evolve in the course of the musical performance ... 2nd order audible developments, i.e., audible developments within audible developments". These processes may involve specific systems of choosing and arranging notes through pitch and time, often involving a long term change with a limited amount of musical material, or transformations of musical events that are already relatively complex in themselves.

Steve Reich defines process music not as, "the process of composition but rather pieces of music that are, literally, processes. The distinctive thing about musical processes is that they determine all the note-to-note (sound-to-sound) details and the overall form simultaneously. (Think of a round or infinite canon.)"

== History ==
Although today often used synonymously with minimalism, the term predates the appearance of this style by at least twenty years. Elliott Carter, for example, used the word "process" to describe the complex compositional shapes he began using around 1944, with works like the Piano Sonata and First String Quartet, and continued to use throughout his life. Carter came to his conception of music as process from Alfred North Whitehead's "principle of organism", and particularly from his 1929 book, Process and Reality.

Michael Nyman has stated that "the origins of this minimal process music lie in serialism". Kyle Gann also sees many similarities between serialism and minimalism, and Herman Sabbe has demonstrated how process music functions in the early serial works of the Belgian composer Karel Goeyvaerts, especially in his electronic compositions Nr. 4, met dode tonen [with dead tones] (1952) and Nr. 5, met zuivere tonen [with pure tones] (1953). Elsewhere, Sabbe makes a similar demonstration for Kreuzspiel (1951) by Karlheinz Stockhausen.

Beginning in the early 1960s, Stockhausen composed several instrumental works which he called "process compositions", in which symbols including plus, minus, and equal signs are used to indicate successive transformations of sounds which are unspecified or unforeseeable by the composer. They specify "how sounds are to be changed or imitated rather than what they are to be". In these compositions, "structure is a system of invariants; these invariants are not substances but relations. ... Stockhausen's Process Planning is structural analysis in reversed time-direction. Composition as abstraction, as generalization. Analysis of reality before its entry into existence". These works include Plus-Minus (1963), Prozession (1967), Kurzwellen, and Spiral (both 1968), and led to the verbally described processes of the intuitive music compositions in the cycles Aus den sieben Tagen (1968) and Für kommende Zeiten (1968–70).)

The term Process Music (in the minimalist sense) was coined by composer Steve Reich in his 1968 manifesto entitled "Music as a Gradual Process" in which he very carefully yet briefly described the entire concept including such definitions as phasing and the use of phrases in composing or creating this music, as well as his ideas as to its purpose and a brief history of his discovery of it.

For Steve Reich it was important that the processes be audible: "I am interested in perceptible processes. I want to be able to hear the process happening throughout the sounding music. ... What I'm interested in is a compositional process and a sounding music that are one and the same thing". This has not necessarily been the case for other composers, however. Reich himself points to John Cage as an example of a composer who used compositional processes that could not be heard when the piece was performed. The postminimalist David Lang is another composer who does not want people to hear the process he uses to build a piece of music.

== Theory ==
Michael Nyman has identified five types of process:

1. Chance determination processes, in which the material is not determined by the composer directly, but through a system he or she creates
2. People processes, in which performers are allowed to move through given or suggested material, each at his or her own speed
3. Contextual processes, in which actions depend on unpredictable conditions and on variables arising from the musical continuity
4. Repetition processes, in which movement is generated solely by extended repetition
5. Electronic processes, in which some or all aspects of the music are determined by the use of electronics. These processes take many forms.

The first type is not necessarily confined to what are normally recognised as "chance" compositions, however. For example, in Karel Goeyvaerts's Sonata for Two Pianos, "registral process created a form that depended neither on conventional models nor ... on the composer's taste and judgment. Given a few simple rules, the music did not need to be 'composed' at all: the notes would be at play of themselves".

Galen H. Brown acknowledges Nyman's five categories and proposes adding a sixth: mathematical process, which includes the manipulation of materials by means of permutation, addition, subtraction, multiplication, changes of rate, and so on.

Erik Christensen identifies six process categories:

1. Rule-determined transformation processes
2. goal-directed transformation processes
3. indeterminate transformation processes
4. Rule-determined generative processes
5. goal-directed, and generative processes
6. indeterminate generative processes

He describes Reich's Piano Phase (1966) as rule-determined transformation process, Cage's Variations II (1961) as an indeterminate generative process, Ligeti's In zart fliessender Bewegung (1976) as a goal-directed transformation process containing a number of evolution processes, and Per Nørgård's Second Symphony (1970) as containing a rule-determined generative process of a fractal nature.

== Notable works ==
- John Cage

As Slow as Possible (1987)

- Elliott Carter

Sonata for Cello and Piano (1948)
String Quartet No. 1 (1950–51)
String Quartet No. 2 (1959)
Double Concerto for Harpsichord and Piano with Two Chamber Orchestras (1959–61)
Piano Concerto (1964–65)
Duo for Violin and Piano (1974)

- Morton Feldman

Piece for Four Pianos (1957)

- Karel Goeyvaerts

Nr. 1, Sonata for Two Pianos (1950–51)
Nr. 4, met dode tonen (1952)
Nr. 5, met zuivere tonen (1953)

- Annea Lockwood

Piano Transplant No. 1. Burning Piano

- Alvin Lucier

I Am Sitting in a Room

- Steve Reich

It's Gonna Rain (1965)
Come Out (1966)
Reed Phase (1966)
Violin Phase (1967)
Piano Phase (1967)
Phase Patterns (1970)
Drumming (1971)

- Terry Riley

In C (1964)
Keyboard Studies

- Frederic Rzewski

Les Moutons de Panurge (1969)

- Karlheinz Stockhausen

Kreuzspiel (1951)
Kontakte
Plus-Minus (1963)
Mikrophonie I (1964)
Solo (1965–66)
Prozession (1967)
Kurzwellen (1968)
Aus den sieben Tagen (1968)
Spiral (1968)
Pole (1969–70)
Expo (1969–70)
Für kommende Zeiten (1968–70)
Ylem (1972)
Michaelion, scene 4 of Mittwoch aus Licht (1997)

- James Tenney

For Ann (rising) (1969)
Postal Pieces (1965–71)
Clang (1972)
Spectral CANON for CONLON Nancarrow (1974)
Three Pieces for Drum Quartet (1975)
Chromatic Canon (1980)
Glissade (1982)
Koan for String Quartet (1984)

- La Monte Young

Poem (1960)

== See also ==
- Tom Johnson
- Conlon Nancarrow
- Indeterminacy (music)
- Generative art
- Category:Process music pieces
