= Spiral (Stockhausen) =

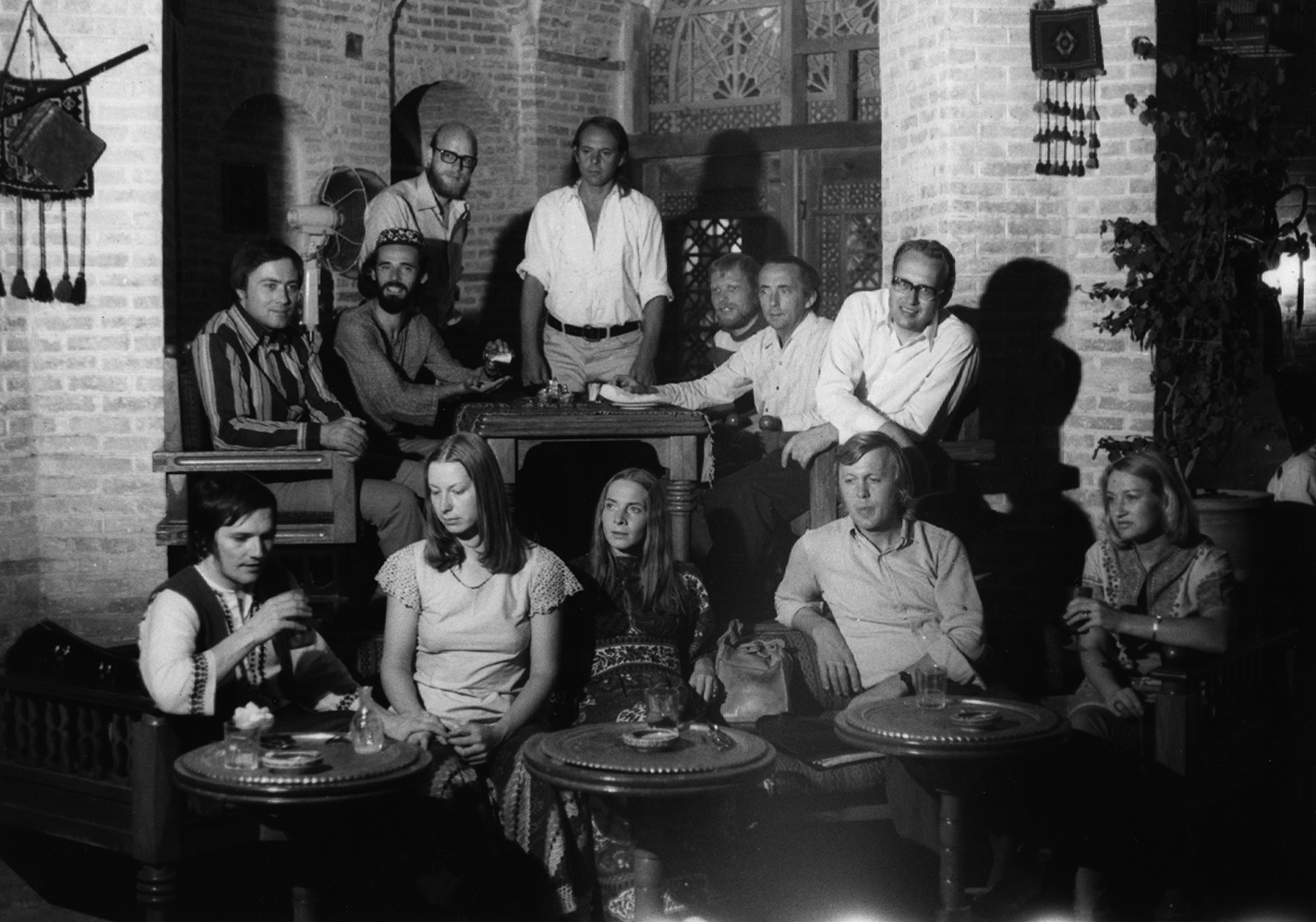
Stockhausen (back, centre) at the Shiraz Arts Festival, September 1972, with several of the Expo 70 performers: front: P. Eötvös, D. von Biel, G. Rodens, W. Fromme, H. Albrecht; second row, second from left: H.-A. Billig; far right: C. Caskel. Also in the photograph, but who was not involved in the Expo 70 performances of Spiral, standing at the left, next to the composer, is the sound engineer Volker Müller

Spiral (Spiral [adj.], Spirally), for a soloist with a shortwave receiver, is a composition by Karlheinz Stockhausen, written in 1968. It is Number 27 in the catalogue of the composer's works.

== Conception ==
Spiral is one of a series of works dating from the 1960s which Stockhausen designated as "process" compositions. These works in effect separate the "form" from the "content" by presenting the performers with a series of transformation signs which are to be applied to material that may vary considerably from one performance to the next. In Spiral and three companion works (Kurzwellen for six performers, Pole for two, and Expo for three), this material is to be drawn spontaneously during the performance from shortwave radio broadcasts. The processes, indicated primarily by plus, minus, and equal signs, constitute the composition and, despite the unpredictability of the materials, these processes can be heard from one performance to another as being "the same".

== History ==
German Pavilion at Expo '70, where Spiral was performed 1300 times in 1970, in the spherical auditorium (out of view to the right)

Spiral was composed in Madison, Connecticut, United States, in September 1968 and was premiered on 15 May 1969 at the Muzički Biennale in Zagreb, Yugoslavia, with oboist Heinz Holliger as the soloist. Holliger performed it subsequently in Saint-Paul-de-Vence, France, and on 10 July 1969 at the Cheltenham Music Festival in the United Kingdom. Between 14 March and 14 September 1970, Spiral was performed 1300 times at Expo '70 in Osaka, Japan, in daily performances by twenty different musicians including the composer. The score is dedicated to the other nineteen: the six singers of the Collegium Vocale Köln (Dagmar Apel, Gaby Rodens, Helga Albrecht, Wolfgang Fromme, Siegfried Bernhöft, and Hans Alderich Billig), and instrumentalists David C. Johnson (flute, synthesizer), Michael Vetter (electric recorder), Edward Tarr (trumpet), Karlheinz Böttner (electric guitar), Christoph Caskel and Michael Ranta (percussion), Rolf Gehlhaar (tamtam), Harald Bojé (Hohner Electronium and piano), Péter Eötvös (55-chord and piano), Gérard Frémy and Aloys Kontarsky (piano), Johannes Fritsch (electric viola), and Mesías Maiguashca (sound direction).

== Structure and technique ==
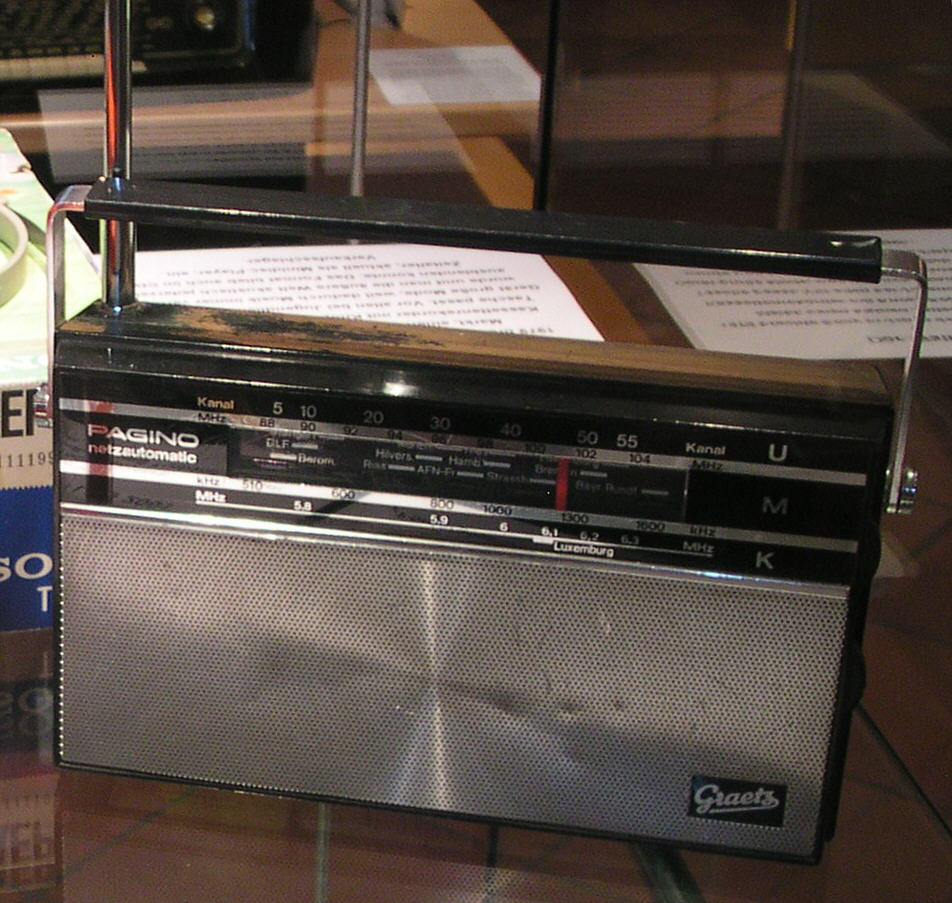
Graetz Pagino receiver, 1969

Spiral consists of a sequence of 206 events, grouped into ten sections which are divided in the score by wavy barlines. Stockhausen explained that in this and his other process pieces "the first step is always that of imitating something and the next step is that of transforming what you're able to imitate". The first event is realized with the short-wave receiver and the instrument/voice together. The subsequent events freely alternate performance by the radio, by the instrument or voice, and their combination, though the score specifies that the performer should attempt to balance the quantity of each type of event.

Each plus, minus, or equal sign indicates that, upon repetition of an event, the performer is to increase, decrease, or maintain the same level in one of four musical dimensions (or "parameters"): duration of the event, number of internal subdivisions, dynamic level, or pitch register. It is up to the performer to decide which of these dimensions is to be affected, though vertically stacked signs must be applied to different parameters. To the signs previously used in Prozession and Kurzwellen, Stockhausen adds a dozen new ones. An especially important one is the "spiral sign", consisting of a column of different combinations of four or five plus or minus signs bracketed by repeat marks. At this sign, the performer is to repeat the previous event several times, transposing it each time in all parameters, and attempt to transcend not only previous limits reached in the piece, but also to go beyond the limitations of the instrument/voice itself. In doing this, the performer is encouraged to employ visual and theatrical possibilities. Spiral is not ordinarily performed complete: the performer may end a version at any of the wavy barlines, and then for the next performance should resume where the previous one left off. On the other hand, the end of the score is marked "da capo" so that, should a chosen starting point result in the end being reached too soon, the performer may continue again from the beginning. Most performances last between fifteen and twenty-five minutes, and Stockhausen did not authorise a full-length version until Michael Vetter convinced him to permit such a thing. The first complete performance was realised by Michael Vetter and was recorded on 22 November 1995 at the Ballhorn Tonstudio in Odenthal, Germany.

== Discography ==
- Karlheinz Stockhausen, Sylvano Bussotti. Spiral für einen Spieler und Kurzwellen (1968); Rara (dolce) für Blockflöte (Duofassung) (1966). Michael Vetter, voice, amplified alto recorder head joint, shortwave radio. Wergo Taschendiskothek 20. Jahrhundert. 7-inch LP. Wergo WER 325. Baden-Baden: Wergo Schallplatten GmbH, [1969]. Spiral reissued (with two versions of Zyklus) 12-inch LP. WERGO Hörzu Black Label SHZW 903BL.
- Heinz Holliger (oboe and short-wave radio; Stockhausen, sound direction). With Holliger: Siebengesang. DG LP. DG 2561 109.
- Stockhausen: Spiral (Version Elektrochord), Wach (aus den 17 Texten intuitiver Musik Für kommende Zeiten), Spiral (Version Elektronium), Japan (aus den 17 Texten intuitiver Musik Für kommende Zeiten), Pole (Version Elektronium & Elektrochord). Harald Bojé (electronium, shortwave radio, Japanese woodblock); Péter Eötvös (electrochord, schalmai, Japanese bamboo flute, shortwave radio); Christoph Caskel (percussion); Karlheinz Stockhausen (sound direction). (Recorded 8–10 December 1971, No. 2 Studio, Abbey Road, London.) EMI 2-LP set. EMI Electrola C165-02 313/314. Cologne: The Gramophone Company Ltd., EMI Electrola GmbH, 1973. Reissued with additional material (Zyklus for a percussionist, Tristan Fry, percussion; Tierkreis for trumpet and organ, and In Freundschaft for trumpet, Markus Stockhausen, trumpet, Margareta Hürholz, organ). 2-CD set. EMI Classics 6 95598 2. [N.p.]: EMI Records, 2009.
- Bojé and Eötvös (different versions from the EMI set). Spiral (2 Versionen); Pole. Péter Eötvös, Harald Bojé, Karlheinz Stockhausen. (Recorded 18 April 1971 at WDR, Cologne.) Stockhausen Complete Edition CD 15. Kürten: Stockhausen-Verlag, 1994.
- Knut Sönstevold Plays Stockhausen. (Solo, In Freundschaft, Spiral, and Tierkreis.) Knut Sönstevold (bassoon); Kina Sönstevold (piano, in Tierkreis). CD. Nosag CD 042. Huddinge, Sweden: Nosag Records, 2000.
- Organic Oboe. Joseph Celli (oboe, cor anglais, shortwave receiver, voice, kazoo, wah-wah pedal, and various auxiliary sound producers). With Celli, Sky: S for J; Elliott Schwartz, Extended Oboe; Malcolm Goldstein, A Summoning of Focus. LP. O.O. Records 1. Hartford, Connecticut: Organic Oboe, Inc., 1978. Reissued on CD. O.O. Discs #1. [n.p.]: O.O. Disc Inc., 1991.
- Stockhausen, Karlheinz. Spiral (1968) for a Soloist. Eberhard Blum (flute, voice, and shortwave receiver). (4 versions). CD. hatART CD 6132. Therwil: Hat Hut Records, 1993.
- Stockhausen, Karlheinz. Solo (2 Versionen)—Spiral. Cathy Milliken (voice, oboe, didgeridoo), in Spiral; Dietmar Wiesner (flute) and Simon Stockhausen (synthesizer), each in one version of Solo. Stockhausen Complete Edition CD 45. Kürten: Stockhausen-Vrlag, 1995.
- Stockhausen, Karlheinz. Spiral, Integrale Version. Michael Vetter, voice and short-wave receiver. 2-CD set. Stockhausen Complete Edition CD 46 A–B. Kürten: Stockhausen-Verlag, 1996.
- Warp Works & Twentieth Century Masters. Clive Williamson; Rolf Hind; Clio Gould; Simon Haram; Jurjen Hempel; Stefan Asbury; Aphex Twin.; Conlon Nancarrow; John Cage; Steve Reich; Squarepusher (Musician); Karlheinz Stockhausen; Edgard Varèse; György Ligeti. 2006, 2003. 2-CD set. WARPCD144; [S.l.]: Warp,
