= Kurzwellen =

Composition by Karlheinz Stockhausen

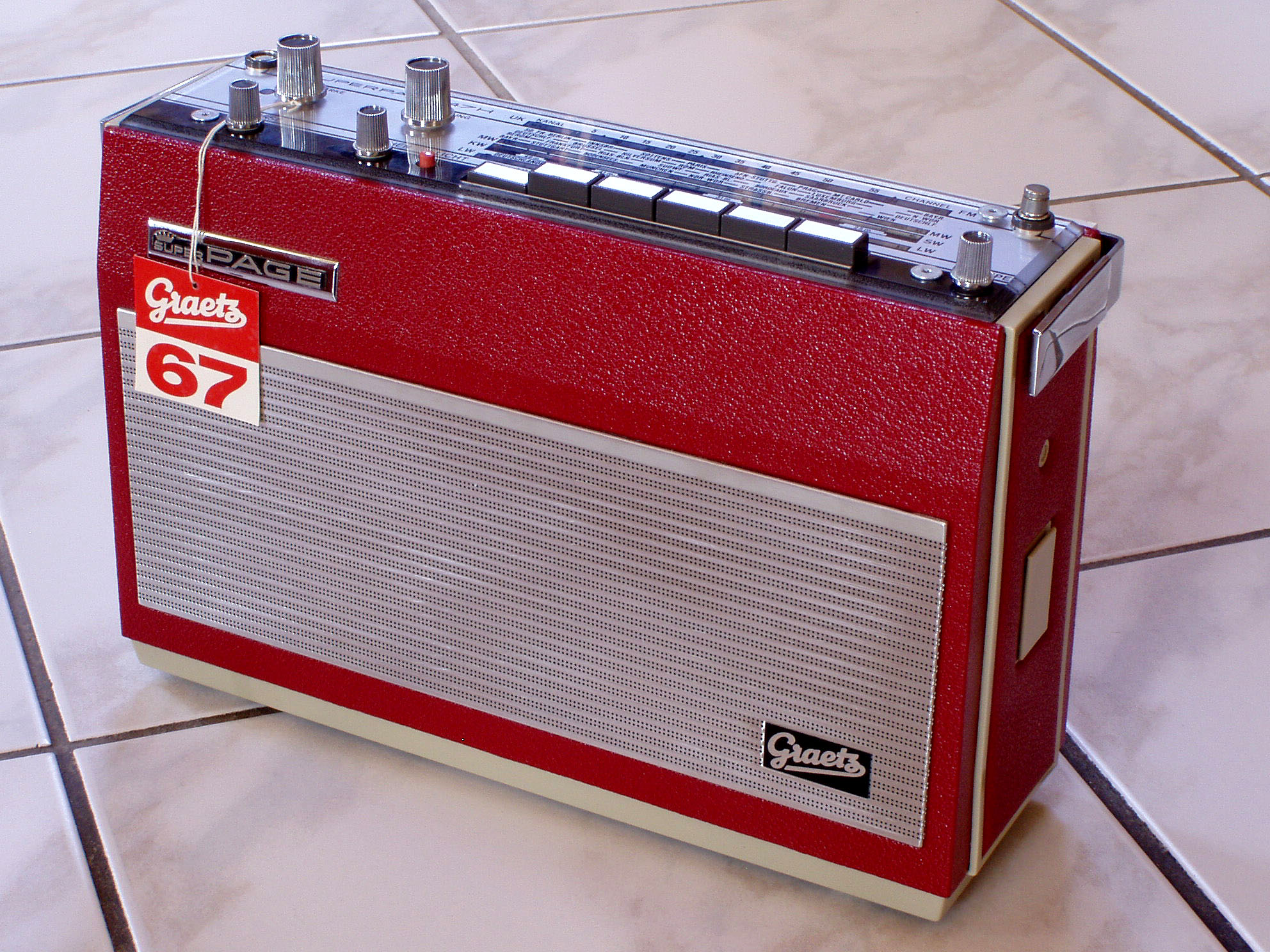
Graetz multiband radio receiver from the composition time of Kurzwellen

Kurzwellen (Short Waves), for six players with shortwave radio receivers and live electronics, is a composition by Karlheinz Stockhausen, written in 1968. It is Number 25 in the catalog of the composer's works.

== Conception ==
Kurzwellen is one of a series of works dating from the 1960s which Stockhausen designated as "process" compositions. These works in effect separate the "form" from the "content" by presenting the performers with a series of transformation signs which are to be applied to material that may vary considerably from one performance to the next. In Kurzwellen and three subsequent works (Spiral for a soloist, Pole for two, and Expo for three), this material is to be drawn spontaneously during the performance from shortwave radio broadcasts.

While this separate treatment of the genetic rules for development had existed in Stockhausen's earlier compositions, the emphasis on the process of transformation and less specificity of what is to be transformed is taken further than ever before in Kurzwellen. The overall formal process is therefore fixed, whereas the sound materials are extremely variable. The processes, indicated primarily by plus, minus, and equal signs, constitute the composition and, despite the unpredictability of the materials, these processes can be heard from one performance to another as being "the same".

While the use of radios in concert works dates back at least to 1942 with John Cage's Credo in Us, and Stockhausen may well have gotten the idea of using radios from Cage, their approaches could not have been more different. For Cage, the type of radio is a matter of indifference, since their purpose is merely to fill in prescribed time units with any sort of sound at all. Stockhausen, on the other hand, prescribed shortwave receivers because of their capability of bringing in broadcasts from far away, and for the rich variety of available sounds. These sounds are also not used indiscriminately: the performers are to search for and select only materials suitable for improvisational transformations.

== History ==
Kurzwellen was initially sketched during a tour of Czechoslovakia made by Stockhausen's ensemble in late March and early April 1968, and was completed soon afterward. The premiere took place on 5 May 1968 in the television studios of Radio Bremen, as part of the Pro Musica Nova festival, and is dedicated to Hugo Wolfram Schmidt, the initiator of the Cologne Courses for New Music. The performers at the premiere were Aloys Kontarsky, piano, Alfred Alings and Rolf Gehlhaar, tamtam, Johannes Fritsch, viola, Harald Bojé, electronium, and Karlheinz Stockhausen, filters and potentiometers.

== Performance practice ==
The composer explained that in pieces like this, "the first step is always that of imitating something and the next step is that of transforming what you're able to imitate". Each performer plays a series of events separated by pauses. An event may be played either with the radio or with an instrument, and it is also possible for a player to accompany an event on an instrument with the radio or vice versa, or to blend both together. Each event has a distinct duration defined by its subdivision into segments with a characteristic rhythm.

Each plus, minus, or equal sign indicates that, upon repetition of an event, the performer is to increase, decrease, or maintain the same level in one of four musical dimensions (or "parameters"): overall duration of the event, number of internal subdivisions, dynamic level, or pitch register/range. It is up to the performer to decide which of these dimensions is to be affected, except that vertically stacked signs must be applied to different parameters. Despite this, a large number of plus signs (for example) will result in successive events becoming longer, more finely subdivided, louder, and either higher or wider in range; a large number of minus signs will produce the reverse effect.

=== Opus 1970 ===
For the Beethoven bicentennial in 1970, Stockhausen created a version of Kurzwellen that supposed a special case in which all radio stations just happened to be broadcasting material by Beethoven. This version is known variously as Kurzwellen mit Beethoven, Kurzwellen mit Beethoven-Musik, Stockhoven-Beethausen, and Opus 1970. In order to produce this situation, Stockhausen replaced the radios with four different tape collages of excerpts from Beethoven compositions interspersed with readings (by Stockhausen) from the Heiligenstadt Testament, subjected to a variety of electronic transformations to simulate the effect of shortwave transmissions. These tapes could be "tuned in and out" by the performers, just like radio transmissions.

== Structure ==
Everything in Kurzwellen is governed by permutations of four-member sets. For example, the whole of the piece is divided into four large sections with increasing numbers of events, proportioned as 4:5:7:10.2. Within each of these progressively larger segments, the numbers of planned ensembles (synchronous or alternating duos, trios, and quartets) also increases: 5:6:7:14.

== Discography ==
- Karlheinz Stockhausen: Kurzwellen. Aloys Kontarsky, piano; Harald Bojé, electronium; Alfred Alings and Rolf Gehlhaar, tamtam with microphone; Johannes Fritsch, viola; Karlheinz Stockhausen, sound direction. Two performances, recorded 4 May 1968 and 9 April 1969. DGG 2-LP set. DG 2707 045. First recording reissued as part of compact disc Litanei 97—Kurzwellen. Stockhausen Complete Edition CD 61. Kürten: Stockhausen-Verlag, 2000. Second recording reissued on compact disc Kurzwellen. Stockhausen Complete Edition CD 13. Kürten: Stockhausen-Verlag, 1992.
- Karlheinz Stockhausen: Opus 1970: Stockhoven-Beethausen. Deutsche Grammophon LP. DG 139461. Reissued on disc 3 of 3-CD set, Stockhausen: "Stockhoven-Beethausen": Opus 1970, Gespräch 1977. Stockhausen Text-CD 23. Kürten: Stockhausen-Verlag, 2011 [liner notes by Wolfgang Rathert]. Two excerpts reissued on the CD accompanying.
- Stockhausen Played by The Negative Band: Short Wave [sic]; Set Sail for the Sun. The Negative Band (Michael Fink, percussion; Earl Howard, alto saxophone; Denman Maroney, piano; David Simons, percussion; Joseph Paul Taylor, synthesizer; Jonathan Weisberger, filter and sound direction). Recorded 29 May 1974. Finnadar LP SR 9009. New York: Finnadar Records, 1975.
- Stockhausen: Weltausstellung 1970. Two interviews, and the second half of Kurzwellen, recorded April 1970 in the spherical auditorium of the German pavilion at Expo 70. Péter Eötvös, piano; Johannes Fritsch, viola; Harald Bojé, electronium; Rolf Gehlhaar, tamtam; Mesías Maiguashca, potentiometers. Stockhausen Text-CD 21. Kürten: Stockhausen-Verlag, 2009.
- Stockhausen: Kurzwellen. C.L.S.I. Ensemble; Paul Méfano, conductor. Recorded January 2012 at GRM Studios, Radio France, Paris. Mode CD 302. Issued 2018.
