= Hymnen =

Electronic and concrete work by Karlheinz Stockhausen

- Electronic and concrete music by Karlheinz Stockhausen
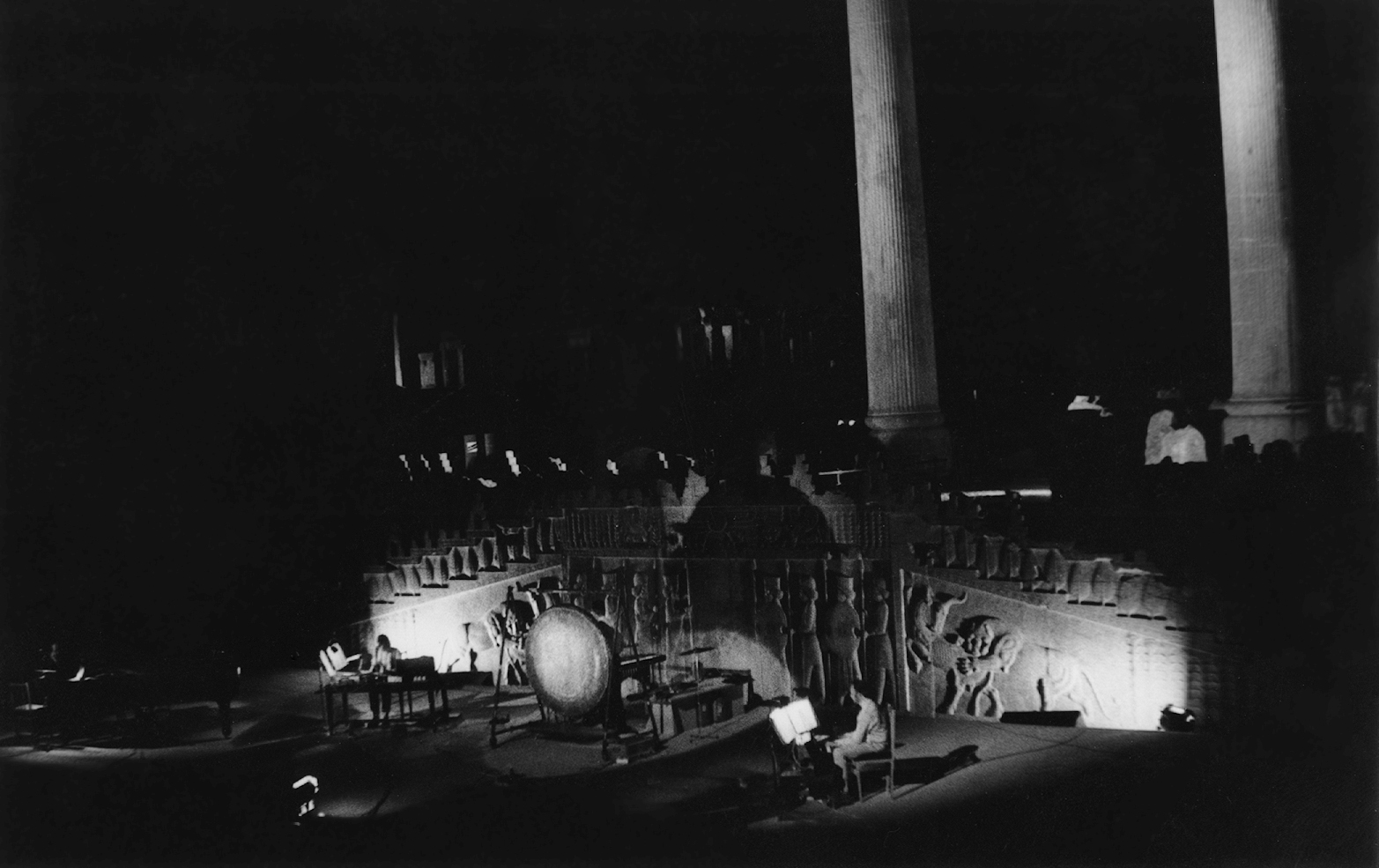
- Hymnen with soloists (Aloys Kontarsky, piano; Péter Eötvös, electrochord; Christoph Caskel, tam-tam; Harald Bojé, electronium), Shiraz Arts Festival, 3 September 1972
- Catalogue: 22
- Based on: National anthems
- Composed: 1966–67, revised 1969
- Dedication: Pierre Boulez; Henri Pousseur; John Cage; Luciano Berio
- Performed: 30 November 1967
- Movements: 4 Regions
- Scoring: Three versions

Hymnen (German for "Anthems") is an electronic and concrete work, with optional live performers, by Karlheinz Stockhausen, composed in 1966–67, and elaborated in 1969. In the composer's catalog of works, it is No. 22.

The extended work is based on national anthems. It is structured in four Regions: Region I is dedicated to Pierre Boulez and uses "The Internationale" and "La Marseillaise", Region II is dedicated to Henri Pousseur and uses the "Deutschlandlied", a group of African anthems, the beginning of the Russian anthem, and a fragment of the "Horst-Wessel-Lied", Region III is dedicated to John Cage and uses the continuation of the Russian anthem, The Star-Spangled Banner, and the "Marcha Real", Region IV is dedicated to Luciano Berio and uses the "Swiss Psalm". Stockhausen wrote three versions, one for electronic and concrete music alone, one for electronic and concrete music with soloists, and finally an orchestral version of Region III, which can be performed by itself, or together with either the first or second version of the other three regions.

Hymnen was first performed in collaboration with the Electronic Music Studio of the broadcaster Westdeutscher Rundfunk (WDR) in Cologne, in a version with soloists on 30 November 1967. The orchestral version was written for Leonard Bernstein and the New York Philharmonic. It was first performed by the orchestra conducted by Stockhausen in New York City on 25 February 1971, together with the American premiere of the other Regions in the version with soloists, taking three hours. A second performance of this version was performed at Yale University on 29 April 1972 in an outdoor performance with a scenario of flag designs real and projected.

== History ==
The quadraphonic electronic and concrete music of Hymnen was realised at the Electronic Music Studio of the Westdeutscher Rundfunk (WDR) in Cologne. The world première was of the version with soloists, and took place on 30 November 1967 in a concert of the WDR concert series Musik der Zeit, at the auditorium of the Apostel Secondary School in Cologne-Lindenthal. The soloists were Aloys Kontarsky, piano, Johannes G. Fritsch, viola, Harald Bojé, electronium, and Rolf Gehlhaar and David Johnson, percussion. Sound technicians were David Johnson and Werner Scholz, sound direction by the composer.

Between January and April 1969, in Madison, Connecticut, Stockhausen created a new version of the Third Region of Hymnen by adding a part for orchestra. This was to fulfill a commission from Leonard Bernstein and the New York Philharmonic, which was originally to have been for a never-completed work titled Projektion. The world premiere of the "Third Region with Orchestra" was given by the New York Philharmonic conducted by Stockhausen in Philharmonic Hall, New York, on 25 February 1971 as part of a special non-subscription concert of the New York Philharmonic, together with the American premiere of the other three regions of Hymnen in the version with soloists. The programme, which started fifteen minutes late due to an unprecedented demand for tickets, lasted for three hours (with two intervals) and was "the longest Philharmonic concert of the last generation, and, for all we know, in Philharmonic history". The first part consisted of the first and the first half of the second region, and was performed with the soloists of Stockhausen's group; after the first interval came the "Third Region with Orchestra", which actually begins halfway through region 2; the third part consisted of the fourth region, again with the soloists of Stockhausen's ensemble: Aloys Kontarsky (piano), Harald Bojé (electronium), Christoph Caskel (percussion), and Péter Eötvös (55-chord).

The second complete performance (following the New York premiere) of all four regions, including the third region performed with live orchestra, took place on the Yale University Cross Campus and in Beinecke Plaza with the Yale Symphony Orchestra, Yale Marching Band, Yale Glee Club, Yale Russian Chorus, Yale Aviation Squadron, WYBC Transistor Radio Band, Silliman College Dramat, etc., on 29 April 1972 in an outdoor performance with a scenario by Sterling Brinkley and John F. Mauceri, "with permission and suggestions by the composer". Flag designs (real and projected) by Chris and Esther Pullman.

Although both the tape-alone version and the version with soloists were performed in London in 1971 (at the Roundhouse during the English Bach Festival, and at St John's, Smith Square, with members of Stockhausen's own group), these both used the two-channel stereo reduction made for the Deutsche Grammophon record. The four-channel version did not receive its UK premiere until 18 August 1975, in the version with soloists performed by Triquetra-Plus, with newly revised parts for the soloists.

== Musical form and content ==
The German title means "(national) anthems", and the substance of the work consists of recordings of national anthems from around the world. There are four movements, called "regions" by the composer, with a combined duration of two hours. The composition exists in three versions: (1) electronic and concrete music alone (2) electronic and concrete music with soloists, and (3) the Third Region (only) with orchestra (composed in 1969). This version of the Third Region can be performed by itself, or together with either the first or second version of the other three regions.

Each region uses certain anthems as centres:

- Region I (dedicated to Pierre Boulez) has two: "The Internationale" and "La Marseillaise"
- Region II (dedicated to Henri Pousseur) has four: (1) the German anthem, (2) a group of African anthems, (3) the opening of the Russian anthem, and (4) a "subjective centre" which contains a fragment of the "Horst-Wessel-Lied", consisting of the recording of a moment during the studio work, "in which the present, the past and the pluperfect become simultaneous".
- Region III (dedicated to John Cage) has three: (1) the continuation of the Russian anthem (the only one made entirely from electronic sounds), (2) the American anthem, and (3) the Spanish anthem.
- Region IV (dedicated to Luciano Berio) has just one, but it is a "double centre": the Swiss anthem, whose final chord turns into an imaginary anthem of the utopian realm of "Hymunion in Harmondie under Pluramon".

Region I also includes a four-language "fugal" section featuring the voices of Stockhausen and his studio assistants David Johnson and Mesías Maiguashca. They speak variations on the colour "red". Stockhausen did not choose a political orientation, but rather used an enumeration of colours from the Artist's Water Colours catalogue from the English art supply company Windsor and Newton [sic], and Johnson concludes the section by naming the company out loud.

Stockhausen originally planned to compose "many more" regions, creating a much longer work. He had collected 137 anthems, of which only 40 are used in the four extant parts, and had organised materials for two further regions, according to contemporary reports:

- Region V: Communist-bloc countries
- Region VI: The United Arab Republic

Stockhausen's original vision for the piece was also much freer. He referred to it as a work "for radio, television, opera, ballet, recording, concert hall, church, out of doors..." in his original program note. He added, "The work is composed in such a way that different scenarios or libretti for films, operas, ballets could be written to the music."

== Performance practice ==
In the printed score, Stockhausen wrote, "The order of the characteristic sections and the total duration are variable. Depending on the dramatic requirement, Regions may be extended, added or omitted." However, in a text written on 18 March 1991 Stockhausen withdrew this option.

Stockhausen also withdrew the soloist version of Hymnen after receiving recordings of it from ensembles that displayed "arbitrary confusion and unembarrassed lack of taste".

The original conception for the version of the Third Region with orchestra was that the musicians should be so familiar with the sounds on the tape that they could react spontaneously by ear during the performance. After years of futile attempts, Stockhausen found it necessary because of limitations on rehearsal time to write out cue notes in the orchestral parts, and even then sometimes found the musicians were playing in the wrong places, because they were not paying attention to the tape: "The musicians improvise with the material that is written, even though they ought to be relying on their ears."

== Reception ==
Notwithstanding Stockhausen's planned but unrealised fifth region intended to focus on Communist countries, composer Konrad Boehmer, a staunch Marxist, castigated Hymnen on political grounds, claiming that its use of anthems primarily from capitalist and fascist nations presents "emblems" indicating the composer's political alignment. He calls the utopian realm of Hymunion "irrational petty-bourgeois supra-nationality".

Robin Maconie, on the contrary, regards any apparent political message as superficial, with less significance for younger audiences than for listeners who remember the student uprisings, Viet Nam, and other issues of mass protest from the time when Hymnen was composed, holding that the musical meaning of Stockhausen's chosen material is not what those sounds might represent, but what they are acoustically.

Johannes Fritsch called Hymnen a "masterpiece", comparable to Beethoven's Missa solemnis, Mahler's Eighth Symphony, and Schoenberg's Moses und Aron. Maconie concurs, while pointing out that the conventional symphony's reliance on instruments and tempos (as points of reference), and on themes and key changes (as variables) are replaced in Hymnen with the anthems and with "ways of hearing", respectively. These ways of hearing include the discovery of highly accelerated events in the midst of very slow ones, or elements of stasis in a context of extreme turbulence; sometimes the anthems are only glimpsed, or become hidden, are overlaid, or broken into fragments and recombined. The result can be interpreted as "a magisterial response from the German musical and intellectual tradition to a US cold war agenda of speech recognition and translation", that at the same time "comprehensively addresses the same underlying issues of melody synthesis by interpolation and substitution programming".

The New York Times included Hymnen in their 2011 history of the mashup, due to it being composed "by mixing national anthems with tape manipulation and signal processing."

== Discography ==
- Ausstrahlungen: Andere Welten: 50 Jahre Neue Musik in NRW. Koch / Schwann 2-5037-0 (2 CDs). Includes Hymnen: Dritte Region mit Orchester Radio-Symphonie-Orchester Köln conducted by Péter Eötvös (recorded 1979).
- Hymnen Elektronische und Konkrete Musik. Deutsche Grammophon DG 2707039 (2LPs). Reissued on CD as part of Stockhausen Complete Edition 10
- Hymnen Elektronische und Konkrete Musik; Hymnen Elektronische und Konkrete Musik mit Solisten. Aloys Kontarsky (piano), Alfred Ailings and Rolf Gehlhaar (amplified tamtam), Johannes G. Fritsch (electric viola), Harald Bojé (electronium). Stockhausen Complete Edition: Compact Disc 10 A-B-C-D (4 CDs)
- Hymnen Elektronische Musik mit Orchester. Gürzenich-Orchester der Stadt Köln, conducted by Karlheinz Stockhausen. Stockhausen Complete Edition: Compact Disc 47.
