= Pole (Stockhausen) =

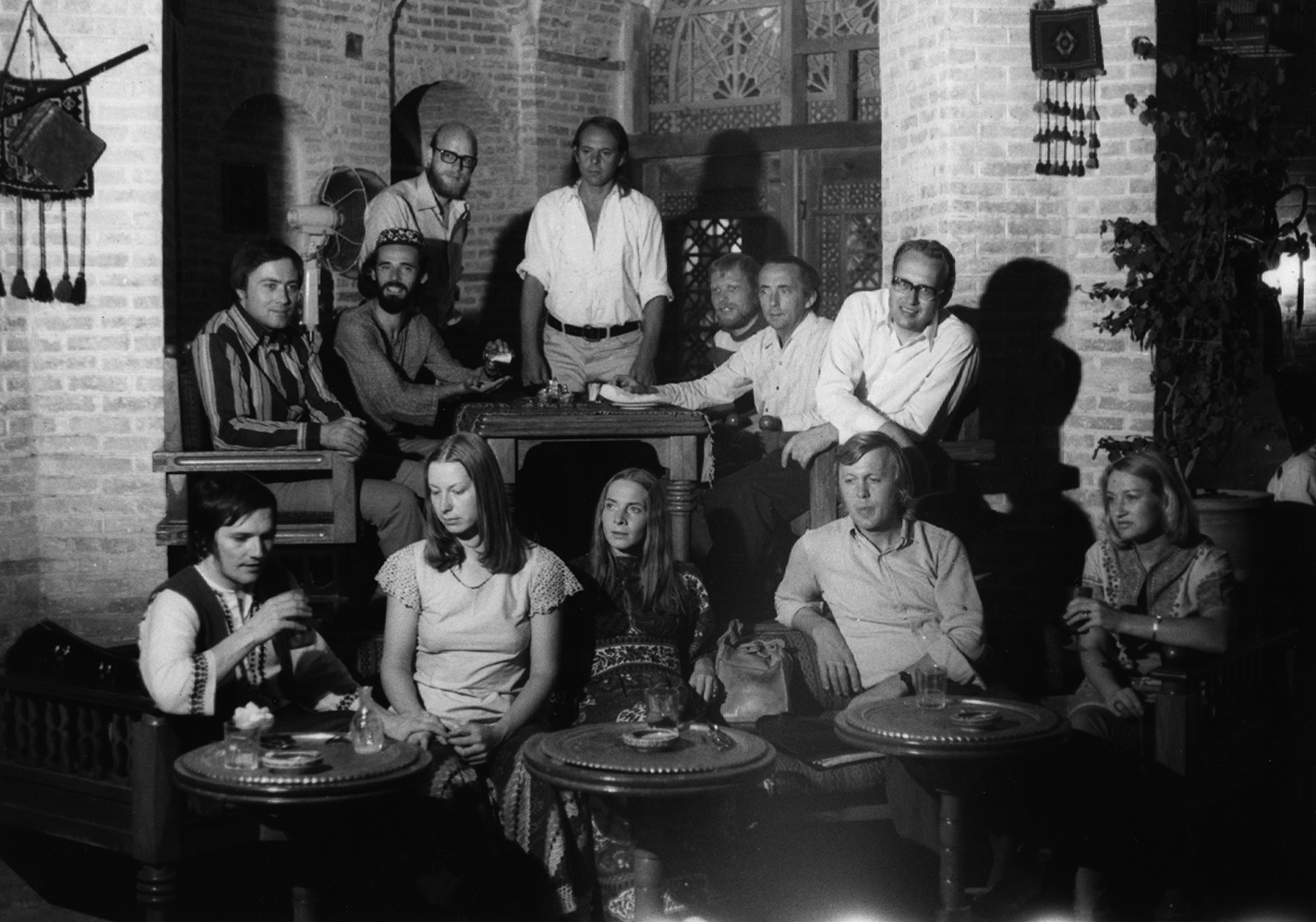
Stockhausen (back, centre) at the Shiraz Arts Festival, September 1972, with several of the Expo '70 performers: front: P. Eötvös, D. von Biel, G. Rodens, W. Fromme, H. Albrecht; second row, second from left: H.-A. Billig; far right: C. Caskel

Pole (Poles), for two performers with shortwave radio receivers and a sound projectionist, is a composition by Karlheinz Stockhausen, written in 1970. It is Number 30 in the catalogue of the composer's works.

== Conception ==
Pole is the last in a series of works dating from the late 1960s which Stockhausen designated as "process" compositions. These works in effect separate the "form" from the "content" by presenting the performers with a series of transformation signs which are to be applied to material that may vary considerably from one performance to the next. In Pole and three companion works (Kurzwellen for six performers, Spiral for a soloist, and Expo for three), this material is to be drawn spontaneously during the performance from shortwave radio broadcasts. The processes, indicated primarily by plus, minus, and equal signs, constitute the composition and, despite the unpredictability of the materials, these processes can be heard from one performance to another as being "the same".

== History ==
German Pavilion at Expo '70, where Pole was performed in the spherical auditorium (out of view to the right)

Pole was composed in Bali in February 1970, at that time under the working title of Duo. Between 14 March and 14 September 1970, Pole was played and sung over a thousand times at Expo '70 in Osaka, Japan, in daily performances by twenty different musicians including the composer. The score is dedicated to Harald Bojé and Péter Eötvös, who played in the majority of the early performances, and who also made a number of radio recordings and two commercially released recordings of the piece.

== Structure and technique ==
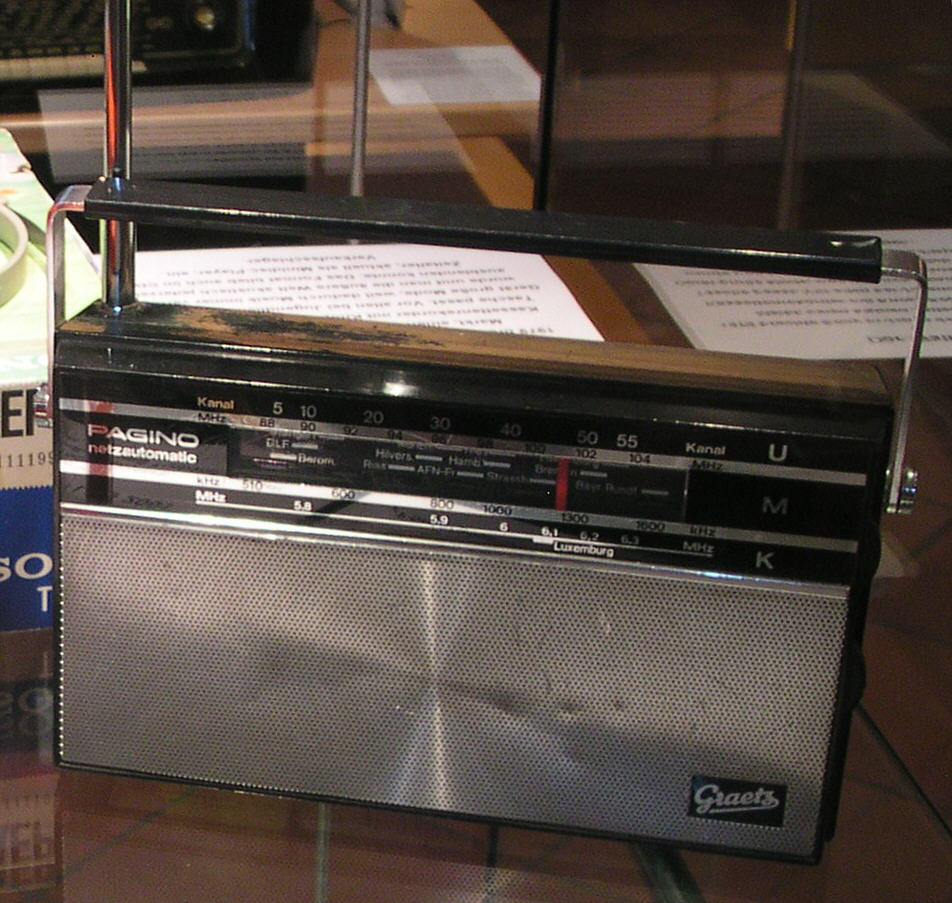
Graetz Pagino receiver, 1969

Pole consists of a sequence of approximately 200 events, grouped into seven sections divided in the score by wavy barlines. Stockhausen explained that in pieces like this, "the first step is always that of imitating something and the next step is that of transforming what you're able to imitate".

Each plus, minus, or equal sign indicates that, upon repetition of an event, the performer is to increase, decrease, or maintain the same level in one of four musical dimensions (or "parameters"): overall duration of the event, number of internal subdivisions, dynamic level, or pitch register/range. It is up to the performer to decide which of these dimensions is to be affected, except that vertically stacked signs must be applied to different parameters. Despite this indeterminacy, a large number of plus signs (for example) will result in successive events becoming longer, more finely subdivided, louder, and either higher or wider in range; a large number of minus signs will produce the reverse effect. To the signs previously used in Prozession, Kurzwellen, Spiral, and Expo Stockhausen adds some new ones and, for the first time, notated the sound-projectionist part which had been left to improvisation in the earlier pieces. At Expo '70, these movements were accomplished using a "rotation mill"—a small box with a crank on the top, like a small coffee grinder. The spherical auditorium of the German Pavilion literally had poles, one above and the other below the audience platform at the "equator". Boldface plus and minus signs represent the zenith and nadir. The sounds of the two soloists are initially placed at the opposite poles (which may be the front and back of the hall, in ordinary spaces, distributed over eight or more channels). At first these sounds occasionally dip toward each other, and then fan out over their respective axes, followed by stairstepping back and forth over independent paths in three dimensions in a breathtaking spatial experience.

== Discography ==
- Harald Bojé (electronium, shortwave radio) and Péter Eötvös (electrochord, schalmei, Japanese bamboo flute, shortwave radio). With Wach and Japan (from Für kommende Zeiten), and two versions of Spiral. (Recorded 8–10 December 1971 at No. 2 Studio, Abbey Road, London.) EMI 2-LP set. EMI Electrola C165-02 313/314. Reissued on 2-CD set, EMI Classics 6955982. London: The Gramophone Company Limited, 1973.
- Bojé and Eötvös (a different version from the EMI set). Spiral (2 Versionen); Pole. Peter Eötvös, Harald Bojé, Karlheinz Stockhausen. (Recorded 18 April 1971 at WDR, Cologne.) Stockhausen Complete Edition CD 15. Kürten: Stockhausen-Verlag, 1994.
- Pole für zwei (Integral Version). Michael Vetter and Natascha Nikeprelevic (voices and auxiliary instruments). Recorded at Sound Studio N, Cologne, on 27 October 2012. Stockhausen Complete Edition CD 103. Kürten: Stockhausen-Verlag, 2013.
