= Für kommende Zeiten =

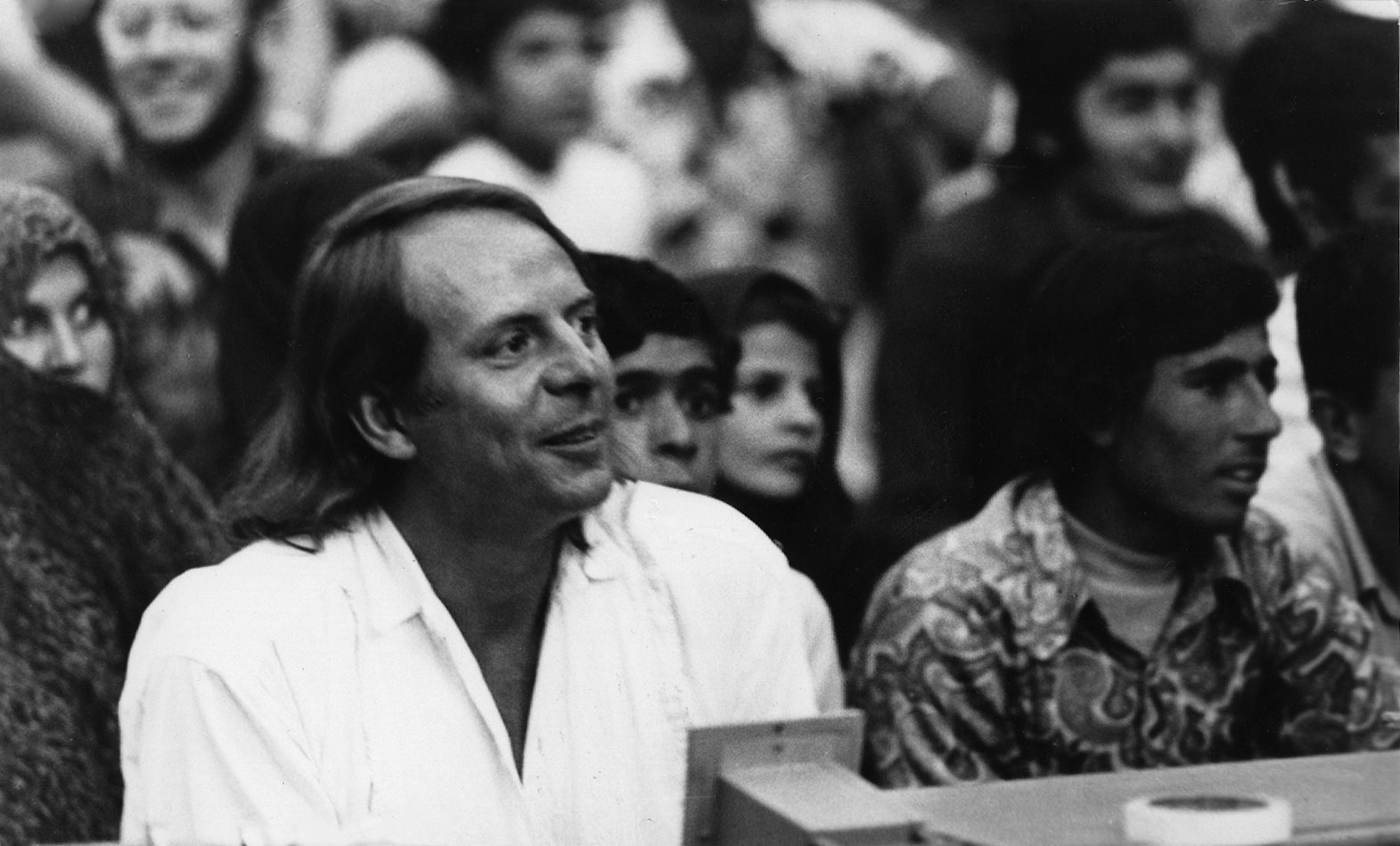
Karlheinz Stockhausen on 2 September 1972 at the Shiraz-Persepolis Festival of Arts, where two pieces from Für kommende Zeiten were performed on 4 and 6 September

Für kommende Zeiten (For Times to Come) is a collection of seventeen text compositions by Karlheinz Stockhausen, composed between August 1968 and July 1970. It is a successor to the similar collection titled Aus den sieben Tagen, written in 1968. These compositions are characterized as "Intuitive music"—music produced primarily from the intuition rather than the intellect of the performer(s). It is work number 33 in Stockhausen's catalog of works, and the collection is dedicated to the composer's son Markus.

== History ==
Unlike the fifteen texts of Aus den sieben Tagen, which were all written in a short span of time, the seventeen components of Für kommende Zeiten were written in four groups of texts, over a period of two years.

The first five pieces were written in August 1968 (the fourth text, Über die Grenze on 13 August), as examples for the students in Stockhausen’s composition seminar at the Darmstädter Ferienkurse. The sixth text, Intervall, was written more than a year later, on 22 September 1969, at the Couvent d'Alziprato in Corsica, for Henry-Louis de La Grange and Maurice Fleuret. The seventh, eighth, and ninth texts were written in February 1970, during a three-week stopover Stockhausen made in Bali, on his way to Japan for Expo '70 in Osaka. The remaining eight texts were composed on the return trip from Osaka, between 4 and 7 July 1970, during another three-week pause in Ceylon.

The first of the pieces to be premiered was Übereinstimmung, performed in London on 20 May 1970 by Gentle Fire (at that time its title was Annäherung). A little over two years later Gentle Fire also gave the first performance of Spektren at the Shiraz Arts Festival on 4 September 1972, in the context of a series of concerts featuring Stockhausen's music. Two days later in the same concert series, Kommunikation was premiered by another English group, Intermodulation, though another source says it was on 4 September and by Gentle Fire.

The piano duo Intervall was premiered in London by Roger Woodward and Jerzy Romaniuk on 5 May 1972, and Ceylon was first performed by the Stockhausen Group at the Metz Festival on 22 November 1973.

== Analysis ==
The seventeen constituent pieces are:

1. Übereinstimmung (Unanimity), for ensemble (originally titled Annäherung [Approximation])
2. Verlängerung (Elongation)
3. Verkürzung (Shortening)
4. Über die Grenze (Across the Boundary), for small ensemble
5. Kommunikation (Communication), for small ensemble
6. Intervall (Interval), for piano duo, four-hands
7. Außerhalb (Outside), for small ensemble
8. Innerhalb (Inside), for small ensemble
9. Anhalt (Halt), for small ensemble
10. Schwingung (Vibration), for ensemble
11. Spektren (Spectra), for small ensemble
12. Wellen (Waves), for ensemble
13. Zugvogel (Bird of Passage), for ensemble
14. Vorahnung (Presentiment), for 4–7 interpreters
15. Japan, for ensemble
16. Wach (Awake), for ensemble
17. Ceylon, for small ensemble

Some of the texts of Für kommende Zeiten provide more specific performance details about elements and processes than the texts from Aus den sieben Tagen do. Intervall, for example, is scored for piano duo, four-hands, and is quite explicit about the course the music is to follow, while Japan includes a written-out melodic formula and Ceylon specifies a rhythmic pattern for the Kandy drum (Geta Bera). Beyond what is written in the score, Stockhausen prepared a form scheme for the first performances of Ceylon—something he never did for any other of his text compositions. When asked if it might not be somehow "cheating" in a piece of intuitive music to prepare so much in advance, Stockhausen replied, "Oh, no! It's not. It helps." Nevertheless, these details actually make the later text pieces more difficult to play, because "they give more mental work to do" and, "because the mental activity of the musicians normally leads to products which relate to music which they know, which is similarly subdivided or organized", they become unable to play intuitively.

In spite of their primarily verbal nature, there is evidence that these seventeen pieces should be regarded as serial compositions.

== Discography ==
In chronological order of recording:

- Prima Vista. Stockhausen: Spektren, Übereinstimmung, and Kommunikation. With works by Kagel, Brown, Cage, Haubenstrock-Ramati, Fortner, Stahmer, Ligeti, and Pousseur. Pro Musica Da Camera (Henner Eppel, flute; Klaus Hinrich Stahmer, cello; Ekkehard Carbow, harpsichord). Recorded 1971. LP recording: 1 sound disc, analog, 33⅓ rpm, stereo, 12 in. Thorofon Capella 76.26016 MTH 224.
- Zauber der Baßklarinette: Due Boemi di Praga—ein Portrait. Stockhausen: excerpt from Über die Grenze (alias "Versetze dich in ein höheres Wesen 3. Teil"), with works by Frescobaldi, Handel, Martinů, Messiaen, Fukushima, Hába, Scharli, and Logothetis. Due Boemi di Praga (Josef Horák, bass clarinet; Emma Kovárnová piano). Recorded 27–28 July 1973. LP recording: 1 sound disc, analog, 33⅓ rpm, stereo, 12 in. Carus FSM 53 114.
- Karlheinz Stockhausen: Spiral (two versions); Wach and Japan from Für kommende Zeiten; Pole. Péter Eötvös, electrochord, shawm, Japanese bamboo flute, synthesizer, and short-wave receiver; Harald Bojé, electronium and short-wave receiver; Christoph Caskel, percussion. LP recording: 2 sound discs, analog, 33⅓ rpm stereo,12 in. EMI Electrola 1C 165 02313-1C 165 02314. Cologne: EMI Electrola GmbH, 1973. Reissued with additional Stockhausen material (Zyklus, Tierkreis, In Freundschaft), 2-CD set, EMI Classics 6955982. London: EMI Classics, 2009.
- Karlheinz Stockhausen: Ceylon/Bird of Passage. Harald Bojé, electronium; Aloys Kontarsky, piano. In Ceylon only: Peter Eötvös, camel bells, triangle, and synthesizer; Joachim Krist, viola; Karlheinz Stockhausen, Kandy drum; Tim Souster, sound projection. In Zugvogel only: Markus Stockhausen, electric trumpet and flugelhorn; John Miller, trumpet; Karlheinz Stockhausen, chromatic rin, lotus flute, Indian bells, bird whistle, voice. Recorded April 1975. LP recording: 1 sound disc, analog, 33⅓ rpm, stereo, 12 in. Chrysalis CHR 1110; Cassette tape recording. Chrysalis ZCHR 1110. Burbank, Calif: Chrysalis Records, 1975. Ceylon reissued (together with Prozession) on Stockhausen Complete Edition CD 11. Kürten: Stockhausen-Verlag, 1994. Zugvogel reissued on Stockhausen: "... ich werde die Töne" 1971; Elektronische Musik 1972. Stockhausen Text-CD 22. Kürten: Stockhausen-Verlag, 2008.
- Musique en Tête—auf Objekten der Austellung "Klangskulpturen '85". Stockhausen: Kommunikation. With works by Christoph Wünsch, Anestis Logothetis, and Klaus-Hinrich Stahmer. Ensemble Ex Improviso (M. Schmidt, Klaus-Hinrich Stahmer, P. Steinhagen, F. Tannenberg, J. Wolf, Christoph Wünsch). Recorded 1985, Würzburg, West Germany. LP recording: 1 sound disc, analog, 33⅓ rpm, stereo, 12 in. Recommended Music RM05.
- Piano Music of the Darmstadt School: Vol. 2. Stockhausen: Intervalle [sic], with works by Earle Brown, Kagel, Schleiermacher, Pousseur, and Lachenmann. Steffen Schleiermacher, piano; Josef Christof, piano (in Intervall). CD recording: 1 disc, digital, stereo, 12 cm. MDG Scene, MDG 613 1005-2. Detmold: Dabringhaus und Grimm Audiovision, 2004.
- Stockhausen: Für kommende Zeiten/For Times to Come. Verkürzung; Wach; Vorahnung; Anhalt; Innerhalb; Wellen. Ensemble for Intuitive Music Weimar (Matthias von Hintzenstern, cello; Hans Tutschku, synthesizer and live electronics; Daniel Hoffman, trumpet and flugelhorn; Michael von Hintzenstern, piano and synthesizer). Stockhausen Complete Edition CD 17.1. Kürten: Stockhusen-Verlag, 2005.
