= Michael Vetter =

German composer

Michael Vetter (18 September 1943 – 7 December 2013) was a German composer, novelist, poet, performer, calligrapher, artist, and teacher.

== Biography ==
Vetter was born in Oberstdorf in the Allgäu region of Germany, and received a conventional school education. He adopted the recorder as his preferred instrument, and began experimenting in the late 1950s with its timbres and techniques, such as multiphonics and microtones. He inspired composers such as Louis Andriessen, and Rob du Bois in the Netherlands, Sylvano Bussotti in Italy, and Mauricio Kagel and Karlheinz Stockhausen in Germany to use the instrument in their compositions. His technical discoveries were codified in a text, Il flauto dolce ed acerbo (The Sweet and Sour Flute, 1969), which included tables of some 2000 fingerings.

He began studying philosophy and theology in 1964, while continuing his career as a performer. In 1967 he began composing graphically and verbally notated music, and beginning in 1968 turned to writing experimental/improvisational vocal music for children.

German Pavilion at Expo '70 (the spherical auditorium is out of view to the right)

From March to September 1970, together with nineteen other musicians, he performed works by Stockhausen (including Hymnen, Spiral, Pole, and Aus den sieben Tagen ) in the spherical auditorium of the German Pavilion at Expo '70 in Osaka, Japan. Back in Europe, he continued his association with Stockhausen, taking part in the world premieres of Sternklang (1971) and Alphabet für Liège (1972). In 1973 he returned to Japan, where he stayed for ten years as a Zen monk. During this period he performed what he called "structural theatre" and in 1981 published a collection of writings on "experimental Zen arts" in a book titled Shijima no oto [The Sound of Silence]. He returned to Germany in 1983 to found the Zentrum für meditative Kommunikation und kommunikative Meditation in Todtmoos-Rütte. In 1993 he moved his "school in the art of living", now renamed Accademia Capraia, to Italy.

In 1997, Stockhausen composed for Vetter the central role of Luca, the Operator, in Michaelion, the fourth scene of his opera Mittwoch aus Licht. Vetter performed the part in the world premiere on 26 July 1998 in the Prinzregententheater, Munich (musica viva series).

Vetter died in Munich on 7 December 2013.

== Musical style ==
Vetter's compositions are based in improvisation. His earlier works are for voice, recorder, and piano, while later he turned to the koto, Tibetan singing bowls, tanpura, and gongs.

== Visual art ==
Vetter's early interest in graphically notated music turned to purely visual expression during his time in Japan, with works such as the ink-brush paintings in The Book of Signs, his 120 colour etched monotypes titled Strukturelle Mandalas and Zweistimmige Inventionen (Two-part Inventions), and the Codex Aureum (Gold-Violet Dialogue between Intention and Chance). Later works, executed after his return to Germany, include a series of panel paintings as entrances and views, titled Symphonies, Duets, Trios, Quartets, Der Kreuzweg des Lichtes, Wolkenbilder, and Die Gesetzestafeln.

== Writings ==
- 1969. Il flauto dolce ed acerbo 1: Anweisungen und Übungen für Spieler neuer Blockflötenmusik. Celle: Moeck-Verlag.
- 1973. Handbewegungen I/II—Roman, with a foreword by Helmut Heißenbüttel. Stuttgart: E. Klett. ISBN 3-12-908930-6 (v. 1); ISBN 3-12-908940-3 (v. 2)
- 1981. With Satoshi Yamanaka. しじまの音 : あるいは、音楽は精神の身体語 [Shijima no oto: arui wa ongaku wa seishin no shintaigo] [The Sound of Silence, or The Physical Language of the Music of the Soul]. Tokyo: Asahishuppansha.
- 1983. Blockflötenschule, 10 vols. Wiener Instrumentalschulen. Vienna: Universal Edition; Stuttgart: E. Klett.
- 1988. Seinserfahrung: das Buch von der Liebe zum Leben. Edition Esotera. Freiburg im Breisgau: Bauer. ISBN 3-7626-0357-X.
- 1990. Transverbal. Kirchzarten-Geroldstal: Selbstverlag.
- 1991. Sesshin: das Fest der Aufnahme des Herzens; dreizehn Vorträge gehalten gelegentlich des Jahreswendesesshins 1990/91 im Griesgethof bei St. Georgen im Schwarzwald. Geroldstal: Vetter-Verlag.
- 1995. Musik: Texte und Bilder zur Einführung in die Kunst, sich in Nichts zu verlieben. Spiritueller Reichtum. Petersberg: Verlag Via Nova. ISBN 3-928632-14-0.
- 1997. Die Psychologie der Seinserfahrung. Freiburg i. Br.: Lüchow. ISBN 3-925898-73-5.
- 2000. Form ist Leere und Leere ist Form: Vorträge während des Sommersesshins 1992 im Griesgethof. Oberried-Geroldstal: Vetter-Verlag.
- 2000. "Karlheinz Stockhausen: Spiral für einen Solisten mit Kurzwellenempfänger—Zur Interpretation des Werkes", transcribed by Henning Moersen. In Komposition und Musikwissenschaft im Dialog I (1997–1998), edited by Imke Misch and Christoph von Blumröder, 95–113. Signale aus Köln 3. Saarbrücken: Pfau-Verlag, ISBN 3-89727-049-8.

== Compositions ==
- Felder II, ein musikalisches Projekt für Kinder (1967)
- Rezitative, für einen Blockflötisten (1967)
- Figurationen III, für ein beliebiges Instrument (1968)
- Linienspiel (1973)
- Liebesspiele: musikalische Konzepte (1973)
- Schreibspiele ohne Worte (1973)
- Cosmic Comic (1975)
- Hörspiele I–IV (1977)
- Die Wiener Blockflötenschule (1983)
- Wenn Himmel und Erde wieder vereinen: Gedanken, Meditationen und Übungen zum Weg der Stimme (1987)
- Die Oberton-Schule (1987)
- Maria: muzikalische Auslegung eines mantrischen Namens (1991)
- Musik (1995)
- Pianissimo: Konzepte für Tasteninstrumente (1996)
- Sei-Un-Sho: ein musikalisches Orakel (1997)

== Discography ==
- Stockhausen, Karlheinz. Goldstaub (from Aus den sieben Tagen, Mai 1968). Péter Eötvös; Herbert Henck; Michael Vetter. Deutsche Grammophon 410 935-1; 2720 073; 2561 301. LP. Hamburg: Deutsche Grammophon. 1973. Reissued on CD as part of 7-CD set: stereo, 12 cm. Stockhausen Complete Edition CD 14. Kürten: Stockhausen-Verlag, 1993.
- Karlheinz Stockhausen: Expo für 3 (Integrale Version in zwei Fassungen). Michael Vetter (voice, recorder, and short-wave radio), Natascha Nikeprelevic (voice and short-wave radio), F. X. Randomiz (lap-top computer system, voice, and short-wave radio). Recorded 12 October 2013 at Sound Studio N, Cologne. CD recording, 1 disc: digital, 12 cm, stereo. Stockhausen Complete Edition CD 104. Kürten: Stockhausen-Verlag, 2014.
- Stockhausen, Karlheinz. Pole für zwei (Integral Version). Michael Vetter and Natascha Nikeprelevic (voices and auxiliary instruments). Recorded at Sound Studio N, Cologne, on 27 October 2012. Stockhausen Complete Edition CD 103. Kürten: Stockhausen-Verlag, 2013.
- Stockhausen, Karlheinz. "Spiral" für Blockflöte und Kurzwellen; Zyklus für einen Schlagzeuger; Klavierstück Nr. 10. Michael Vetter (recorder and shortwave radio); Max Neuhaus (percussion); Frederic Rzewski (piano); Christoph Caskel (percussion). LP. Wergo, Hörzu Black Label SHZW 903 BL. Mainz: Wergo.
- Stockhausen, Karlheinz. Spiral, Integrale Version. Michael Vetter, voice and short-wave receiver. 2-CD set. Stockhausen Complete Edition CD 46 A–B. Kürten: Stockhausen-Verlag, 1996.
- Stockhausen, Karlheinz. Sternklang. 2-LP set. Deutsche Grammophon 2707 123 (2531 281; 2531 282). [Hamburg]: Deutsche Grammophon, 1976. Polydor 2612 031 (2335 116; 2335 117). [Hamburg]: Polydor International, 1976. Reissued on 2-CD set, Stockhausen Complete Edition CD 18 A–B. Kürten: Stockhausen-Verlag, 1992.
- Szathmáry, Zsigmond. Organ Improvisations. Zsigmond Szathmáry: Omaggio a György Ligeti; Michael Vetter: Der Kreis; John Cage: Music for Carillon No. 5; Shinichi Matsushita: Konzentration; Roman Haubenstock-Ramati: Ohne Titel. Wergo CD 60119-50 (1983). Reissued in 1996 under the same catalog number as Music and Graphic: Organ Improvisations.
- Vetter, Michael. Ancient Voices. Michael Vetter and the Overtone Choir. Amiata Records New Music Series. CD. ARNR 0192. Florence. Amiata Records,1992.
- Vetter, Michael . Nocturne, Amiata Records New Music Series CD, Florence, Amiata Records, 1993
- Vetter, Michael. Clouds: Music for Koto Harp and Voice. Michael Vetter, koto harp and voice. Jecklin-Disco JD 636-2. 1990.
- Vetter, Michael. Il flauto dolce ed acerbo. Michael Vetter (recorder). LP recording. Jürg Baur, Mutazioni; Rob du Bois, Pastorale VII; Klaus Hashagen, Gesten; Dieter Schönbach, Canzona da sonar III; Michael Vetter, Figurationen III and Rezitative. Corono, 1974.
- Vetter, Michael. Flowers: Musical Icons for Piano and Voice. Michael Vetter, piano and voice. Jecklin-Disco JD 637-2. 1990.
- Vetter, Michael. Light: Music for Tamburas and Voice. Michael Vetter, tamburas and voice. Jecklin-Disco JD 640-2. 1990.
- Vetter, Michael. Missa Universalis: Obertonmesse für Stimme und Instrumentarium. LP, Spectrum SM 1051, Mainz: Spectrum, 1985. CD. Spectrum SM 1051-50. Mainz: Spectrum, 1986.
- Vetter, Michael. Om. 3-CD set. Ginkgo SM 1812-2, 1813-2, 1814-2; Ginkgo 281 812-2, 281 813-2, 281 814-2. [Mainz, Germany]: Ginkgo, 1996, 1987.
- Vetter, Michael. Overtones in Old European Cathedrals: Senanque. Compact Disc. Wergo SM 1078-50. Mainz: Wergo, 1989, 1987.
- Vetter, Michael. Overtones: Voice and Tambura. 2-LP set. Mainz: Wergo Spectrum, 1983.
- Vetter, Michael. Pianissimo. CD. WER T 335-2. Zürich: Atlantis Musikbuch-Verlag, 1996.
- Vetter, Michael. Silence. Michael Vetter, voice, singing bowls, and cymbals. CD. Jecklin Disco JD 641-2. Zürich: Jecklin Disco, 1990.
- Vetter, Michael. Spaces. Compact disc. Jecklin Disco JD 639-2. Zürich: Jecklin Disco, 1990.
- Vetter, Michael. Tambura Meditations. Compact disc . Mainz: Wergo Spectrum, 1984. Reissued on CD, Wergo Spectrum SM 1039-50. Mainz: Wergo Spectrum, 1990.
- Vetter, Michael. Wind: Music for Flutes, Voice and Gongs. Michael Vetter, flutes, voice, and gongs. Jecklin-Disco JD 638-2. 1990.
- Vetter, Michael. Zen Glocken. Wergo Spectrum SM 1054-2. Mainz: Wergo Spectrum, 1990.
- Vetter, Michael. Zen-Gong. Compact disc. Wergo Spectrum SM 1053-2. Mainz, W. Germany: Wergo Spectrum, 1990, 1986.
- Vetter, Michael. Zen-Flöte. Michael Vetter. LP recording. Spectrum SM 1062. Mainz, W. Germany: Spectrum, 1987.
- Vetter, Michael. Zen-Koto: Erinnerungen in die Gegenwart. Compact disc. Wergo Spectrum SM 1052-2. Mainz, W. Germany: Wergo Spectrum, 1990, 1985.
