= Johannes Fritsch =

German composer

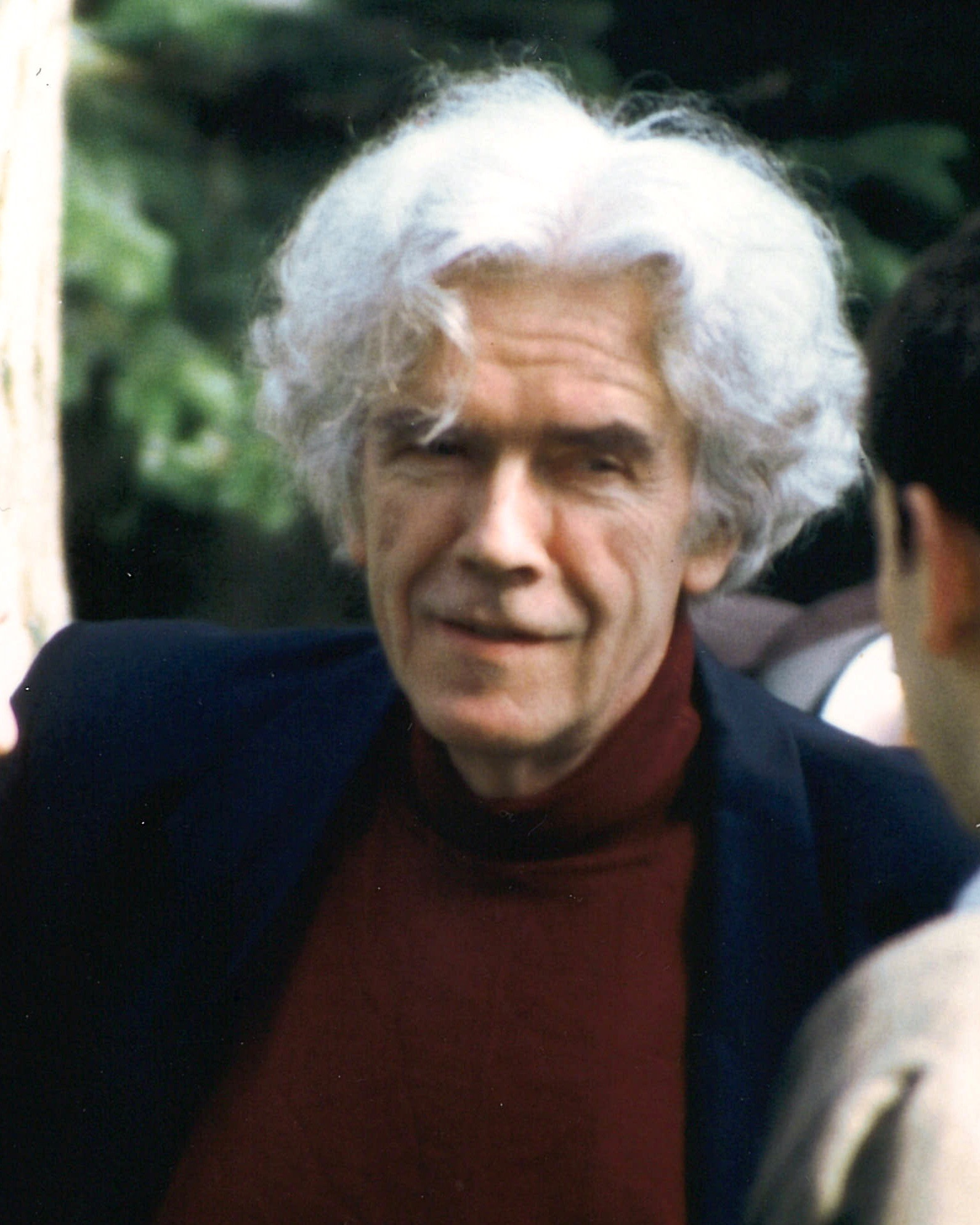
In 2002

Johannes Georg Fritsch (27 July 1941 – 29 April 2010) was a German composer.

At the age of seven, Fritsch found a violin in the attic of his uncle's house in Bensheim-Auerbach, Germany, and began lessons with a village music teacher named Knapp. When he was ten, his family moved to Cologne, and he began studying with the principal violist in the Gürzenich Orchestra.

He studied music, sociology, and philosophy from 1961 to 1965 at the University and the Staatliche Musikhochschule in Cologne with, amongst others, Bernd Alois Zimmermann and Gottfried Michael Koenig. In the following years he applied himself to the most varied musical activities. Amongst other things he played viola in the Stockhausen-Ensemble from 1964 to 1970, and took part in the German exhibition at Expo '70, the World's Fair in Osaka in 1970.

Although he had begun to compose at the age of 17, Fritsch regards as his first real composition the Duett für Bratsche (Duet for Viola), for viola and tape, which had a succès de scandale when he performed it at the Darmstädter Ferienkurse in 1962—one newspaper review called him a kühner Kratzer (audacious scraper).

In 1966 Fritsch received the Förderpreis (Monetary Award) of the Federal State of North Rhine–Westphalia, and in 1971 the Prize of the Paris Biennale. Since the 1970s there have been further awards, such as the Förderpreis of the City of Cologne, and the Robert-Schumann Prize of the City of Düsseldorf.

In 1970 Fritsch was one of the founders of the Feedback Studio of Cologne (together with Rolf Gehlhaar and David Johnson), and has been since 1975 active as the chief protagonist of the Feedback Studio Verlag, the first German composers' publishing house. He is a producer of compact discs, editor of the Feedback Studio Papers (one of the journals dedicated to electronic music), a publisher of scores of contemporary music, and a concert manager. In 1979, 1982, 1984, and 1986 he was with WDR manager of the World Music Congresses in Vlotho.

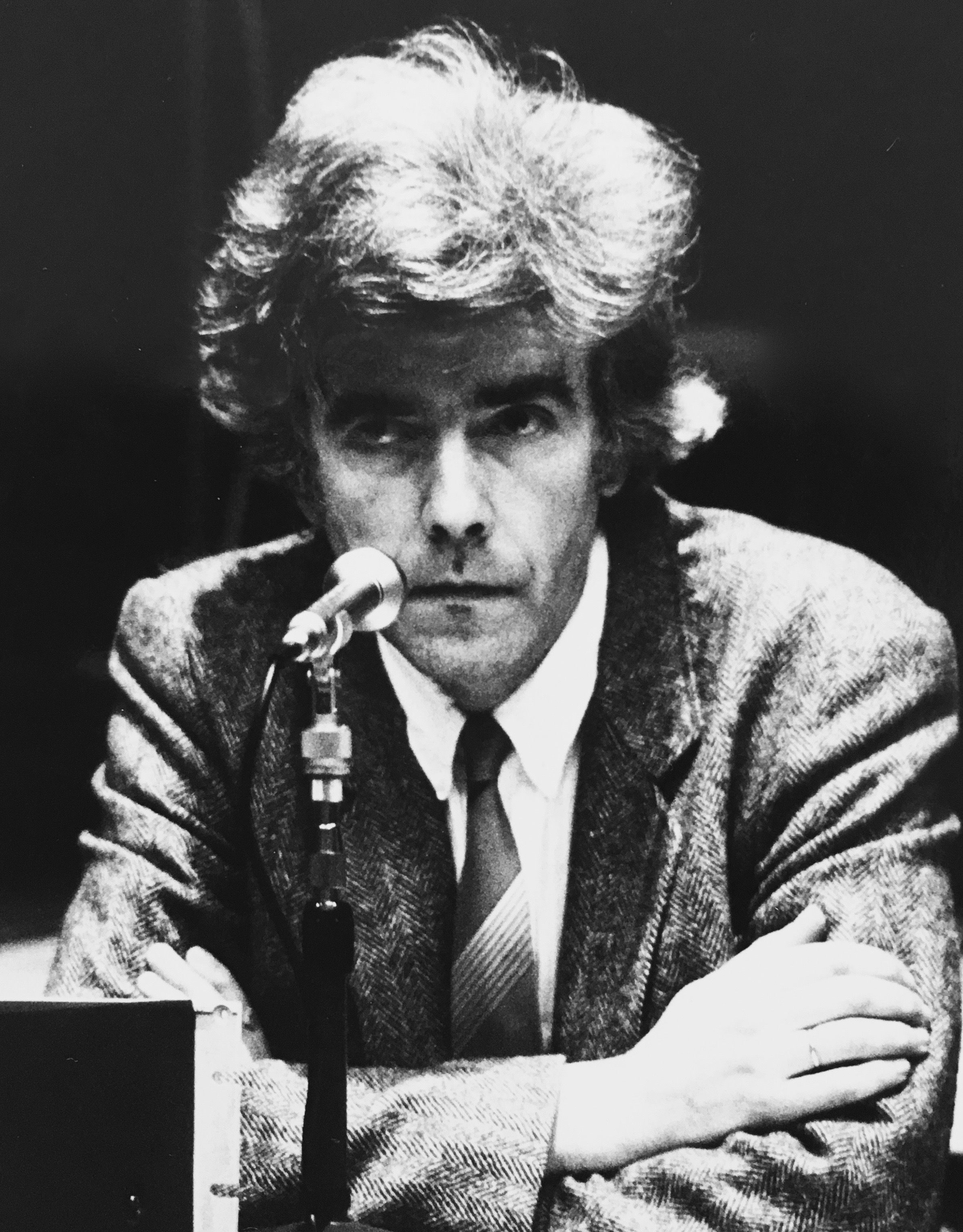
Johannes Fritsch in Japan 1987, photo by Hiroshige Kanoh, time up studio.

From 1984 he was Professor of Composition at the Staatliche Hochschule für Musik in Cologne, where his students have included Volker Staub, Caspar Johannes Walter, Juan María Solare, Josef Rebbe, Branimir Krstic and many other composers and improvisors.

He died at the age of 68 on 29 April 2010 after a long illness.
