= Aloys and Alfons Kontarsky =

German brothers and pianists

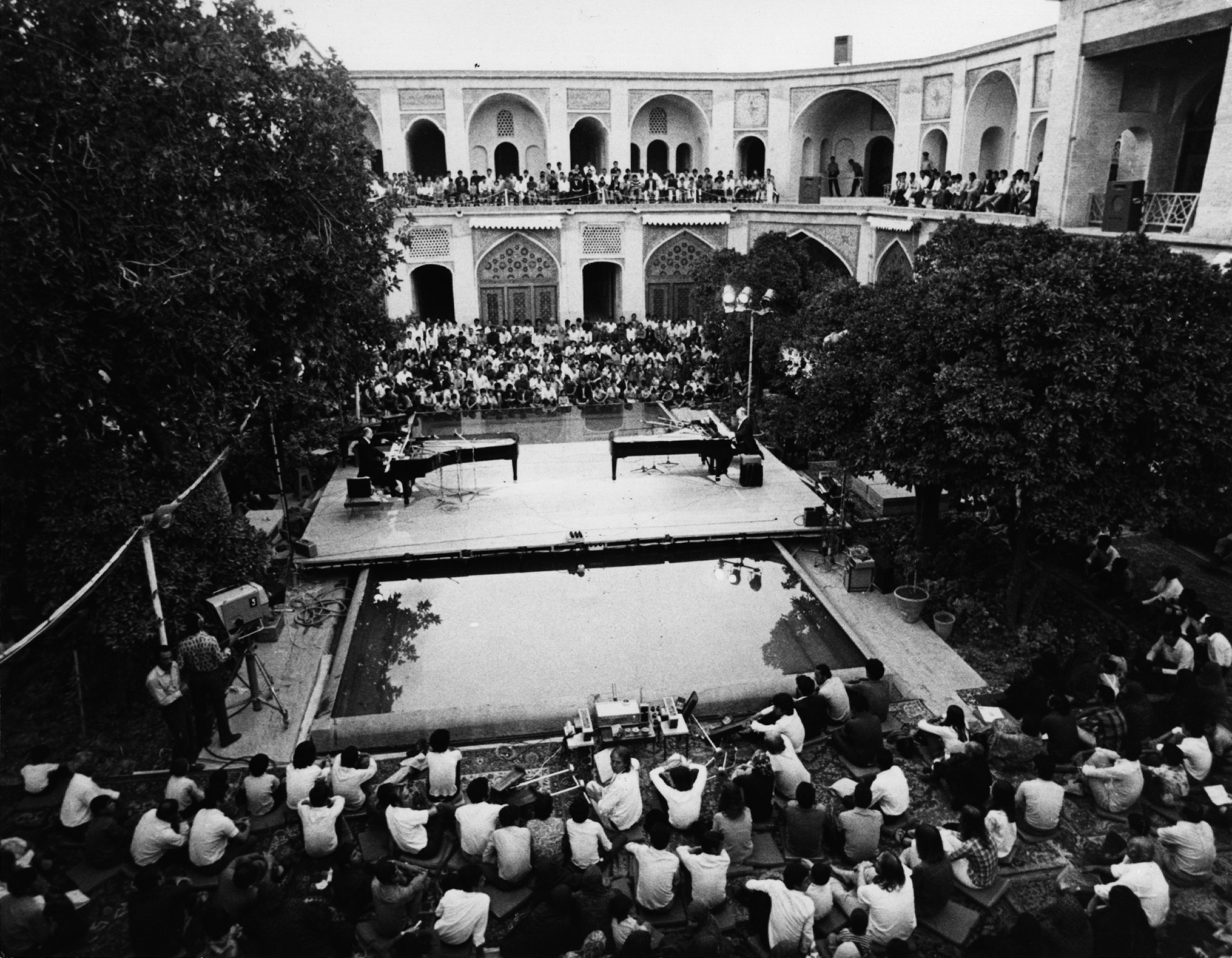
The Kontarskys performed Stockhausen's Mantra at the Shiraz Arts Festival, Iran on 2 September 1972. The composer at the mixing desk, foreground centre.

Aloys (14 May 1931 – 22 August 2017) and Alfons (9 October 1932 – 5 May 2010) Kontarsky were German duo-pianist brothers who were associated with a number of important world premieres of contemporary works. They had an international reputation for performing modern music for two pianists, although they also performed the standard repertoire and they sometimes played separately. They were occasionally joined by their younger brother Bernhard in performances of pieces for three pianos. After suffering a stroke in 1983, Aloys retired from performing.

== Biography ==
The Kontarsky brothers were both born in Iserlohn. Aloys received early tuition from Franz Hanemann. He later studied at Cologne and Hamburg with Else Schmitz-Gohr, and with Eduard Erdmann in Hamburg.

Their first public concert was in 1949, in which they played Stravinsky's Concerto for Two Pianos. In 1955 they formed their piano duo "Klavierduo Kontarsky" and performed regularly from 1959 until Aloys became paralyzed in 1983 as the result of two strokes. In 1955, they won first prize for piano duo at the fourth German Radio International Music Competition.

From 1962, Aloys and Alfons were instructors at the Darmstadt International Summer Courses for New Music. Aloys was also a member of the Darmstadt International Chamber Ensemble. From 1963, Aloys was an instructor at the Cologne Courses for New Music. Alfons was a member of the Bavarian Academy of Fine Arts and of the Deutscher Musikrat (German Music Council, a member of the International Music Council) and held professorships at Music Universities in Cologne, Munich. In 1965 Aloys formed a duo with the cellist Siegfried Palm.

Kontarsky brothers, 1967

As a piano duo, the brothers gave first performances of works by Luciano Berio, Sylvano Bussotti, Mauricio Kagel, Karlheinz Stockhausen, Henri Pousseur, Luis de Pablo, and Bernd Alois Zimmermann. They made frequent tours of Western European countries, the Middle East, and the Americas, and also appeared in Australia and on two tours in Southern Africa. Their recordings are numerous, and include Bartók's Sonata for Two Pianos and Percussion, Stockhausen's Mantra, supervised by the composer, once issued on LP by Deutsche Grammophon and reissued on CD 16 of the Stockhausen Complete Edition, and Structures for two pianos by Pierre Boulez. They also performed the standard repertoire. Their more traditional fare includes the complete Brahms Hungarian Dances and Schubert's Fantasia in F minor, D.940. They are heard on the soundtrack of the 1990 film Henry & June, playing Debussy's Petite Suite.

In 1974, Alfons made the first recording with the original instruments of Schubert's Arpeggione Sonata in A minor, D.821, the arpeggione played by Klaus Storck and Alfons playing fortepiano. Aloys appeared in a recording of Stockhausen's Mikrophonie I playing the tam-tam, and Alfons participated in Mikrophonie II, playing the Hammond organ.

In 1959 Aloys married the actress Gisela Saur. According to one source, Aloys may have appeared as a conductor, in the 1994 French premiere at the Opéra-Bastille in Paris of Bernd Alois Zimmermann's Die Soldaten, but another report names his younger brother, Bernhard, as conductor for this production. It seems unlikely this was Aloys, who in 1983 suffered two debilitating strokes, which left him paralyzed on one side with visual and speech disorders. His wife, Gisela Saur-Kontarsky, curtailed her artistic career as a singer in order to attend to her husband. In 2008, she was presented with a Medal of Merit from the City of Cologne by Mayor Fritz Schramma for her service to her husband.

Their students included: York Höller, Steffen Schleiermacher, Christine Gerwig and Efraín González Ruano, Anna Haas-Niewiedział and Piotr Niewiedział, Douglas Nemish and Dominique Morel, and many others. See: List of music students by teacher: K to M#Aloys and Alfons Kontarsky.

Alfons Kontarsky was awarded the Austrian Cross of Honour for Science and Art, 1st class in 1999.

== Sources ==
- Cadieu, Martine. 1994. "Les soldats de Zimmermann". Europe: Revue littéraire mensuelle 72, no. 779 (March): 194–96.
- Campbell, Margaret. 2005. "Siegfried Palm: Cellist and Opera Director". The Independent (2 July).
- Jarry, Hélène. 1994. "L’opéra de Zimmermann enfin montré à Paris". L’Humanité (26 January).
- Kennedy, Michael, and Joyce Bourne (eds.) 1996. "Kontarsky, Aloys". The Concise Oxford Dictionary of Music. Oxford: Oxford University Press.
- Lück, Rudolf, and Ateş Orga. 2001a. "Kontarsky, Alfons". The New Grove Dictionary of Music and Musicians, edited by Stanley Sadie and John Tyrrell. London: Macmillan.
- Lück, Rudolf, and Ateş Orga. 2001b. "Kontarsky, Aloys". The New Grove Dictionary of Music and Musicians, edited by Stanley Sadie and John Tyrrell. London: Macmillan.
- Schminke, Clemens. 2008. "Für vorbildlichen Einsatz geehrt" Kölner Stadt-Anzeiger (5 November)
- Stockhausen, Karlheinz. 1967. "Notes", translated by Hugh Davies. Karlheinz Stockhausen: Complete Piano Music, Aloys Kontarsky, piano. First recording, supervised by the composer. 2-LP set. CBS Masterworks 32 21 0008 (stereo) and 32 21 0007 (mono). Reprinted online, Analog Arts Ensemble.
- Thiollet, Jean-Pierre. 2015. "Solo de duo" in his 88 Notes pour piano solo, 97–98. [France]: Neva editions. ISBN 978-2-3505-5192-0.
