= Christoph Caskel =

German percussionist and teacher (1932–2023)

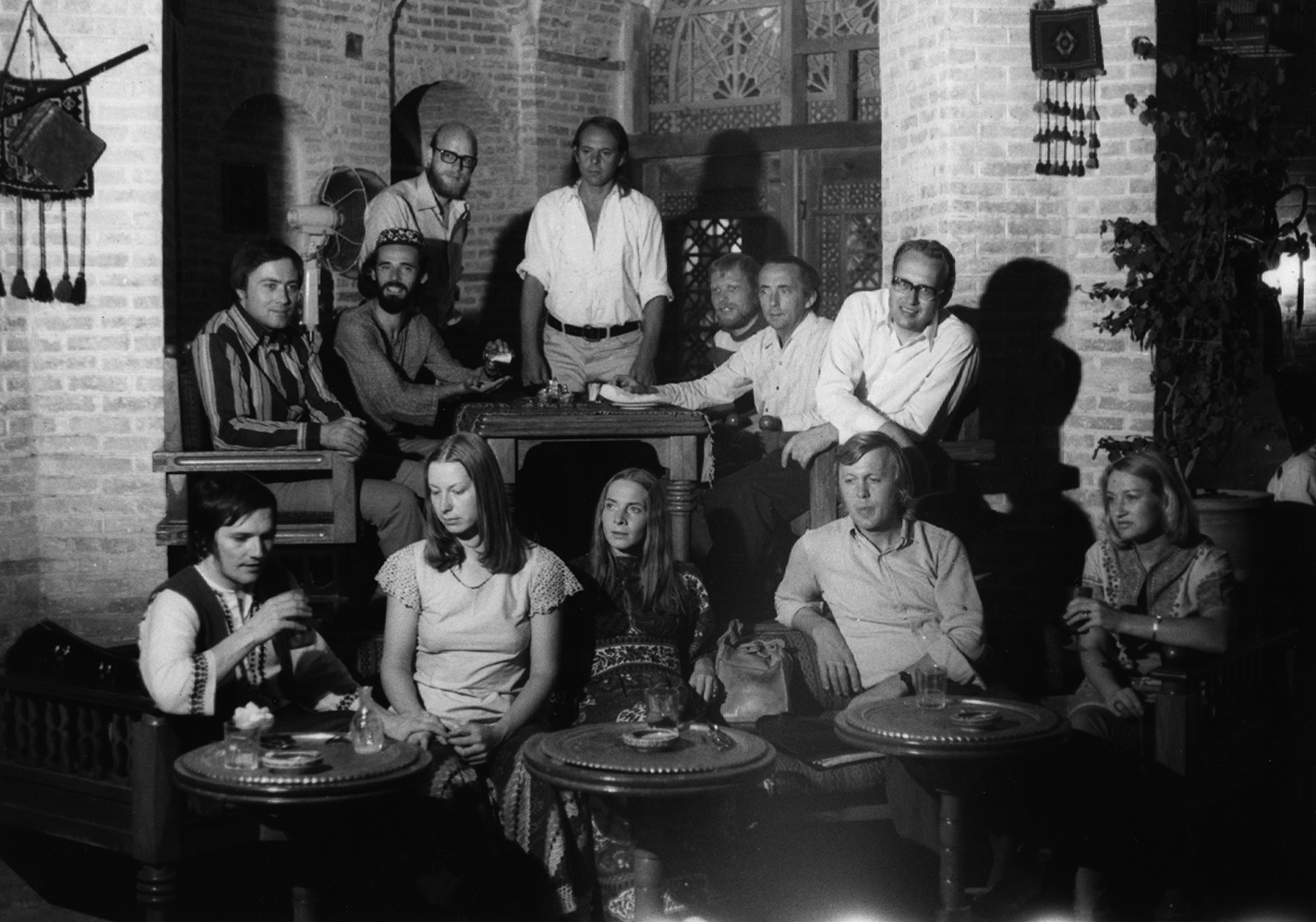
Caskel (sitting, 2nd row, far right) with Karlheinz Stockhausen (standing, center), Péter Eötvös (sitting, 1st row, far left), members of Collegium Vocale Köln (Shiraz Arts Festival 1972)

Christoph Caskel (12 January 1932 – 19 February 2023) was a German percussionist and teacher.

== Life and career ==
Born in Greifswald, Caskel began learning percussion at an early age, taking lessons at the age of five with a military musician and as a schoolboy with a percussionist from the Berlin State Opera. He studied percussion formally from 1949 to 1953 with Wenzel Pricha at the Staatliche Hochschule für Musik in Cologne. During these years, he began taking an interest in contemporary music under the influence of another lecturer at the Hochschule, the cellist Maurits Frank. After completing his conservatory training, he studied musicology from 1953 to 1955 at the University of Cologne.

By the beginning of the 1960s Caskel had become known internationally as a performer of chamber music and solo works by contemporary composers, taking part in the premieres of important works such as Karlheinz Stockhausen's Zyklus (1959) and Kontakte (1960), Helmut Lachenmann’s Intérieur (1966), and Mauricio Kagel’s Transición II (1958–59), all of which he also recorded. He has also taken an interest in historical percussion instruments, serving as timpanist in the early music orchestra Capella Coloniensis. In 1964 he joined the Stockhausen Ensemble. He also performed and recorded (twice, in 1963 and 1977) Béla Bartók's Sonata for Two Pianos and Percussion with Aloys and Alfons Kontarsky.

In 1963 he was appointed to the faculty of the Rheinische Musikschule in Cologne, and in the same year formed a duo with the harpsichordist Franzpeter Goebels. In 1973 he became professor of timpani and percussion at the Hochschule für Musik und Tanz Köln. Amongst his notable students are Manos Tsangaris, Sascha Dragićević, Paul Lovens, Hans Ulrich Humpert, Frank Köllges, Peter Eisheuer, and Cornel Țăranu. In addition, he has devoted himself to the instruction of beginning percussionists, publishing a book for complete beginners, Snare Drum... step by step.... , in 2005. He has published articles on percussion in Die Musik in Geschichte und Gegenwart, as well as an article on percussion notation in the Darmstädter Beiträge zur neuen Musik (1965).

Caskel died on 19 February 2023, at the age of 91.

== Awards ==
In 1963 he received the Förderpreis des Landes Nordrhein-Westfalen für junge Künstlerinnen und Künstler.

== Bibliography ==
- Caskel, Christoph. 1965. "Notation für Schlagzeug". In Notation neuer Musik, edited by Ernst Thomas, 110–116. Darmstädter Beiträge zur Neuen Musik 9. Mainz: Schott. English edition, as "Notation for Percussion Instruments", translated by Vernon Martin. Percussionist 8, no. 3 (March 1971): 80–84.
- Caskel, Christoph. 2005. Snare drum ... step by step ... : Trommel-Schule für Einsteiger von 8 bis 80 Jahren. Bergisch-Gladbach: Leu-Verlag.
