= Live electronic music =

Music genre

Live electronic music (also known as live electronics) is a form of music that can include traditional electronic sound-generating devices, modified electric musical instruments, hacked sound generating technologies, and computers. Initially the practice developed in reaction to sound-based composition for fixed media such as musique concrète, electronic music and early computer music. Musical improvisation often plays a large role in the performance of this music. The timbres of various sounds may be transformed extensively using devices such as amplifiers, filters, ring modulators and other forms of circuitry. Real-time generation and manipulation of audio using live coding is now commonplace.

== History ==
=== 1800s–1940s ===
==== Early electronic instruments ====
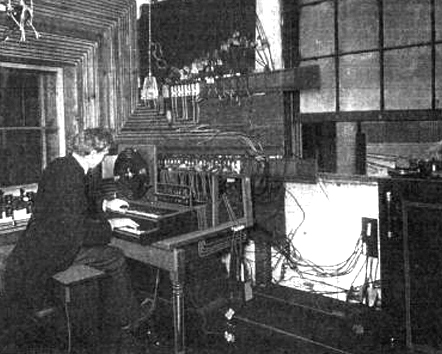
This Telharmonium console (likely pictured in the late 1890s) is an early electronic organ by Thaddeus Cahill, and one of the first electronic instruments used for live performance.

Early electronic instruments intended for live performance, such as Thaddeus Cahill's Telharmonium (1897) and instruments developed between the two world wars, such as the Theremin (1919), Spharophon (1924), Ondes Martenot (1928), and the Trautonium (1929), may be cited as antecedents, but were intended simply as new means of sound production, and did nothing to change the nature of musical composition or performance.

Many early compositions included these electronic instruments, though the instruments were typically used as substitutes for standard classical instruments. An example includes composer Joseph Schillinger, who in 1929 composed First Airphonic Suite for Theremin and Orchestra, which premièred with the Cleveland Orchestra with Leon Theremin as soloist. Percy Grainger, used ensembles of four or six theremins (in preference to a string quartet) for his two earliest experimental Free Music compositions (1935–37) because of the instrument's complete 'gliding' freedom of pitch.( The Ondes Martenot was also used as a featured instrument in the 1930s, and composer Olivier Messiaen used it in the Fête des belles eaux for six ondes, written for the 1937 International World's Fair in Paris.

Cage's Imaginary Landscape No. 1 (1939) was among the earliest compositions to include an innovative use of live electronic material; it featured two variable-speed phonograph turntables and sine-tone recordings. Cage's interest in live electronics continued through the 1940s and 1950s, providing inspiration for the formation of a number of live-electronic groups in America who came to regard themselves as the pioneers of a new art form.

The earliest use of live electronics together with acoustic instruments is in all likelihood Daphne Oram’s Still Point (1948), a work for turntable, double orchestra and five microphones. The work was unperformed until 2016.

=== 1950s–1960s ===
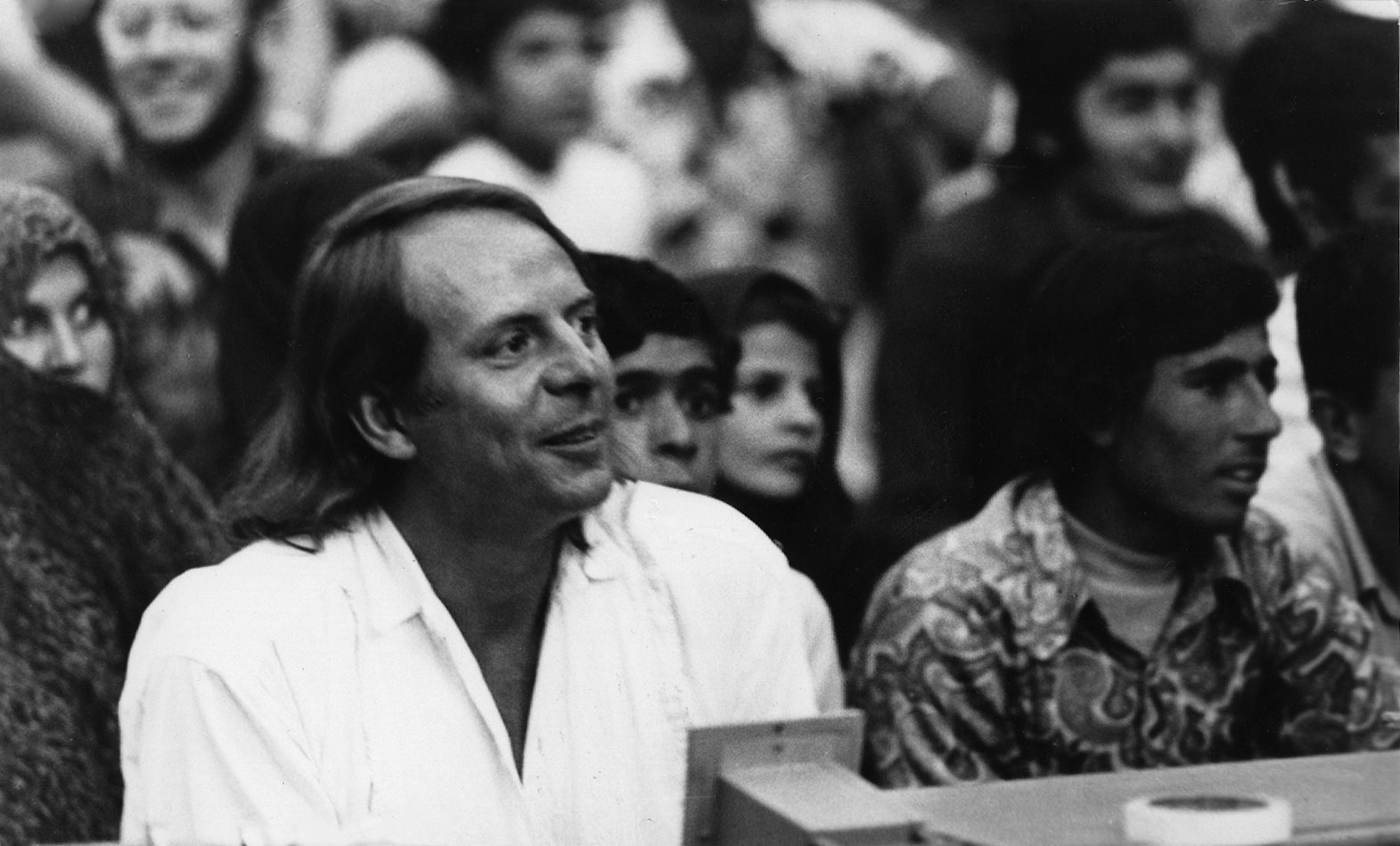
Stockhausen (2 September 1972 at the Shiraz Arts Festival, at the sound controls for the live-electronic work Mantra), who wrote a number of notable electronic compositions in the 1960s and 1970s in which amplification, filtering, tape delay, and spatialization was added to live instrumental performance

In Europe, Pierre Schaeffer had attempted live generation of the final stages of his works at the first public concert of musique concrète in 1951 with limited success. However, it was in Europe at the end of the 1950s and early 1960s that the most coherent transition from studio electronic techniques to live synthesis occurred. Mauricio Kagel's Transición II (1959) combined two tape recorders for live manipulation of the sounds of piano and percussion, and beginning in 1964 Karlheinz Stockhausen entered on a period of intensive work with live electronics with three works, Mikrophonie I and Mixtur (both 1964), and Mikrophonie II. While earlier live-electronic compositions, such as Cage's Cartridge Music (1960), had mainly employed amplification, Stockhausen's innovation was to add electronic transformation through filtering, which erased the distinction between instrumental and electronic music.

During the 1960s, a number of composers believed studio-based composition, such as musique concrète, lacked elements that were central to the creation of live music, such as: spontaneity, dialogue, discovery and group interaction. Many composers viewed the development of live electronics as a reaction against "the largely technocratic and rationalistic ethos of studio processed tape music" which was devoid of the visual and theatrical component of live performance. By the 1970s, live electronics had become the primary area of innovation in electronic music.

=== 1970s–1980s ===
The 1970s and 1980s were notable for contributions by electronic musician Jean-Michel Jarre. The success of Oxygene and his large scale concerts which he performed attracted millions of people, breaking his own record for largest audience four times.) In fact Jarre continued to break his own records up to the end of the century, with 3.5 million people attending 1997's Oxygene in Moscow.

=== 1990s ===
==== Laptronica ====
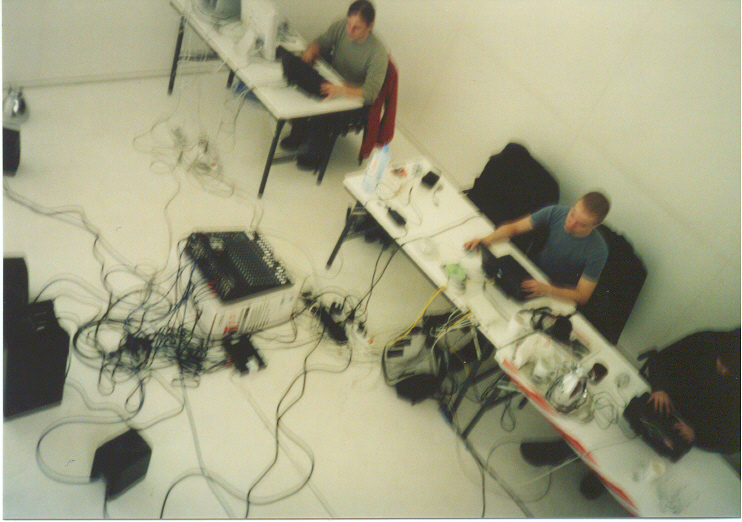
Farmers Manual 2002, performing laptronica

Laptronica is a form of live electronic music or computer music in which laptops are used as musical instruments. The term is a portmanteau of "laptop computer" and "electronica". The term gained a certain degree of currency in the 1990s and is of significance due to the use of highly powerful computation being made available to musicians in highly portable form, and therefore in live performance. Many sophisticated forms of sound production, manipulation and organization (which had hitherto only been available in studios or academic institutions) became available to use in live performance, largely by younger musicians influenced by and interested in developing experimental popular music forms. A combination of many laptops can be used to form a laptop orchestra.

==== Live coding ====
Live coding example using Impromptu

Live coding (sometimes referred to as 'on-the-fly programming', 'just in time programming') is a programming practice centred upon the use of improvised interactive programming. Live coding is often used to create sound and image based digital media, and is particularly prevalent in computer music, combining algorithmic composition with improvisation, Typically, the process of writing is made visible by projecting the computer screen in the audience space, with ways of visualising the code an area of active research. There are also approaches to human live coding in improvised dance. Live coding techniques are also employed outside of performance, such as in producing sound for film or audio/visual work for interactive art installations.

Live coding is also an increasingly popular technique in programming-related lectures and conference presentations, and has been described as a "best practice" for computer science lectures by Mark Guzdial.

==== Electroacoustic improvisation ====
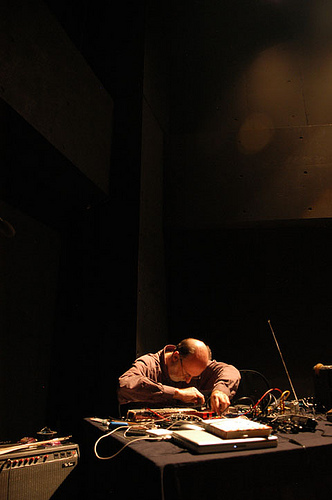
Keith Rowe (pictured in 2008) improvising with prepared guitar at a music festival in Tokyo

Electroacoustic improvisation (EAI) is a form of free improvisation that was originally referred to as live electronics. It has been part of the sound art world since the 1930s with the early works of John Cage. Source magazine published articles by a number of leading electronic and avant-garde composers in the 1960s.

It was further influenced by electronic and electroacoustic music and the music of American experimental composers such as John Cage, Morton Feldman and David Tudor. British free improvisation group AMM, particularly their guitarist Keith Rowe, have also played a contributing role in bringing attention to the practice.

== Notable works 1930s–1960s ==
The following is an incomplete list, in chronological order, of early notable electronic compositions:

- John Cage – Imaginary Landscape (1939–1952)
- John Cage – Cartridge Music (1960)
- Robert Ashley – Wolfman (1964), Lecture Series (1965), Purposeful Lady Slow Afternoon (1968)
- Karlheinz Stockhausen – Mikrophonie I & II (1964 and 1965); Mixtur (1964); Solo (1966); Prozession (1967); Kurzwellen (1968); Spiral (1968)
- Alvin Lucier – Music for Solo Performer (1965), North American Time Capsule (1967), Vespers (1968)
- Johannes Fritsch – Partita (1965–66) for viola, contact microphones, tape recorder, filters, and potentiometers (4 players); Modulation 2 (1967), for 13 instruments and live electronics; Akroasis (1966–68) for large orchestra with jazz band, two singers, live electronics, hurdy-gurdy, music box, and newsreader
- David Behrman – Wave Train (1967)
- Gordon Mumma – Hornpipe (1967)
- Steve Reich – Pendulum Music (1968)
- Max Neuhaus – Drive-in Music (1968)
- Larry Austin – Accidents (1968)
- Richard Teitelbaum – In Tune (1968)
- Louis Andriessen, Hoe het is (1969) for 52 strings and live electronics
- Louis Andriessen, Reinbert de Leeuw, Misha Mengelberg, Peter Schat, Jan van Vlijmen – Reconstructie (1969), Morality opera for soloists, 3 mixed choirs, orchestra, and live electronics
- George Brown – Splurge (1969)
- Takehisa Kosugi – 712-9374 (1969)
- Roger Smalley – Transformation I (1969)

== See also ==
- List of electronic music festivals
- New Interfaces for Musical Expression
- Operation Re-Information
- List of music software
