= Mikrophonie (Stockhausen) =

Compositions by Karlheinz Stockhausen

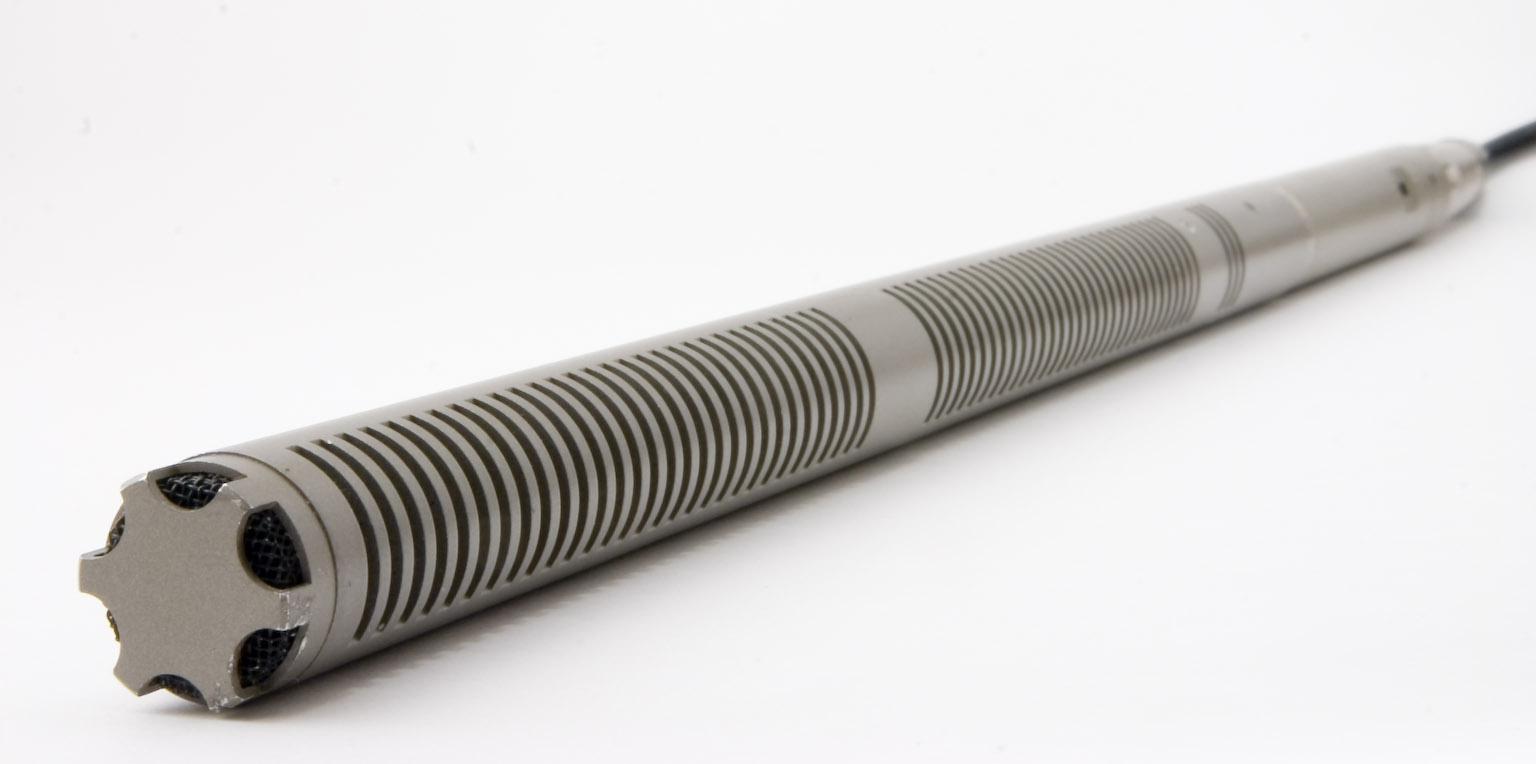
A highly directional microphone of the type required for Mikrophonie I

Mikrophonie is the title given by Karlheinz Stockhausen to two of his compositions, written in 1964 and 1965, in which "normally inaudible vibrations ... are made audible by an active process of sound detection (comparable to the auscultation of a body by a physician); the microphone is used actively as a musical instrument, in contrast to its former passive function of reproducing sounds as faithfully as possible".

Together with Stockhausen's immediately preceding work Mixtur (for five orchestra groups, four sine-wave generators and four ring modulators) they form a triptych of live-electronic works, where electronic transformations are accomplished during the performance (as opposed to studio-produced electronic music on tape). Similar to a group of three of the composer's works from the previous decade, Gruppen, Zeitmaße, and Gesang der Jünglinge, there is one work each for orchestral, chamber, and vocal forces.

== Derivation of the term ==
Stockhausen uses the term "microphony" here as the auditory analog to "microscopy" in the optical realm. That is, the microphone is used investigatively, to make perceptible "objects usually beneath our notice, but also for a kind of precise whimsy, ... like one of the micronauts in the film The Fantastic Voyage". (OED entry "microscopy", citing the London Review of Books, 26 March 1992)

I searched for ways to compose—flexibly—also the process of microphone recording. The microphone ... would have to become a musical instrument and, on the other hand, through its manipulation, influence all the characteristics of the sounds. In other words, it would have to participate in forming the pitches—according to composed indications—harmonically and melodically, as well as the rhythm, dynamic level, timbre and spatial projection of the sounds.

== Mikrophonie I ==
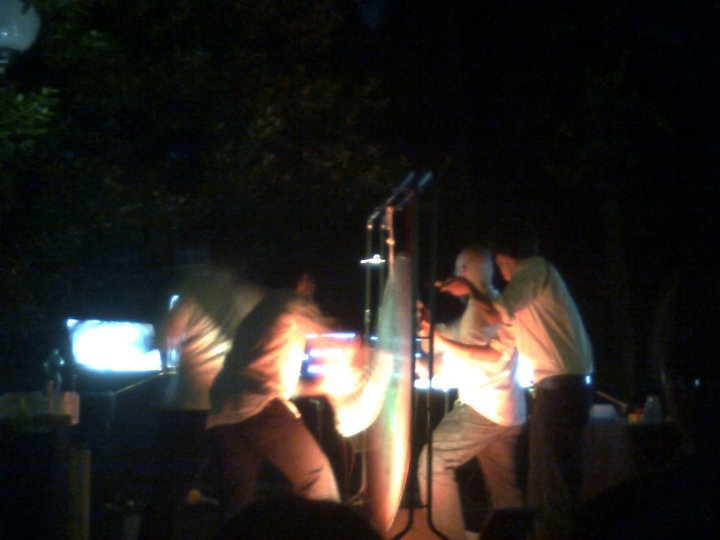
Performance of Mikrophonie I at the Conservatorio Niccolò Paganini, Genoa, in 2010

Mikrophonie I (Work Number 15), for tamtam, 2 microphones, 2 filters, and controllers, is an example of moment form, polyvalent form, variable form, and process composition. It consists of 33 structural units, or "moments", which can be ordered in a number of different ways, according to a "connection scheme" specifying the relationships between successive moments by a combination of three elements, one from each of the following groups: (1) similar, different, or opposite; (2) supporting, neutral, or destroying; (3) increasing, constant, or decreasing.

In Mikrophonie I two percussionists play a large tam-tam with a variety of implements. Another pair of players use hand-held microphones to amplify subtle details and noises, inflecting the sound through quick (and precisely scored) motions. The last two performers, seated in the audience, apply resonant bandpass filters to the microphone outputs and distribute the resulting sounds to a quadraphonic speaker system.

The piece was composed on the basis of the results of an experiment carried out by the composer and Jaap Spek in August 1964:

I had bought myself a large tamtam for my composition MOMENTE, and set it up in my garden. I now made some experiments, exciting the tamtam with a great variety of implements – of glass, cardboard, metal, wood, rubber, plastic – that I collected from around the house, and connected a microphone (with strong directional sensitivity) that I held in my hand and moved around, to an electrical filter, whose output led to a potentiometer and was then made audible over a loudspeaker. My collaborator Spek was in the house and changed the filter settings and the dynamic levels, improvising. At the same time, we recorded the result on tape. The tape recording of this first microphony experiment was for me a discovery of the greatest importance. We had made no agreement about what the other would do; I used some of the implements that lay to hand as the mood took me, and at the same time I probed the surface of the tamtam with the microphone, as a doctor probes a body with a stethoscope; Spek also reacted spontaneously to what he heard as the result of our combined activity. (preface to the score of Mikrophonie I, p. 9)

After an initial attempt to notate the actions and implements proved impractically complicated, Stockhausen decided to categorize the sounds according to their perceived qualities: "groaning", "trumpeting", "whirring", "hooting", "roaring", "grating", "chattering", "wailing", "sawing", "ringing", "choking", "cawing", "clacking", "snorting", "chirping", "hissing", "grunting", "crunching", "clinking", "tromboning", "scraping", etc., in a scale of 36 steps from the darkest and lowest to the brightest and highest sounds. Through this emphasis on subjectively perceived qualities, "For the first time a perceptual equivalent to totally organized structure has been discovered, and it is particularly significant that this has been done with very simple means. This successful fusion of abstract theory and expression makes Mikrophonie I a work of singular importance".

"Someone said, must it be a tam-tam? I said no, I can imagine the score being used to examine an old Volkswagen musically, to go inside the old thing and bang it and scratch it and do all sorts of things to it, and play MIKROPHONIE I, using the microphone." However, when it came to tam-tams, some were less suitable than others, and the assortment of implements used to excite the tam-tam in the original performances could be substituted only with difficulty, if the desired range of sounds was to be obtained.

Mikrophonie I was first performed in Brussels on 9 December 1964. The score is dedicated to the composer's godson, Alexander (Xandi) Schlee.

== Mikrophonie II ==
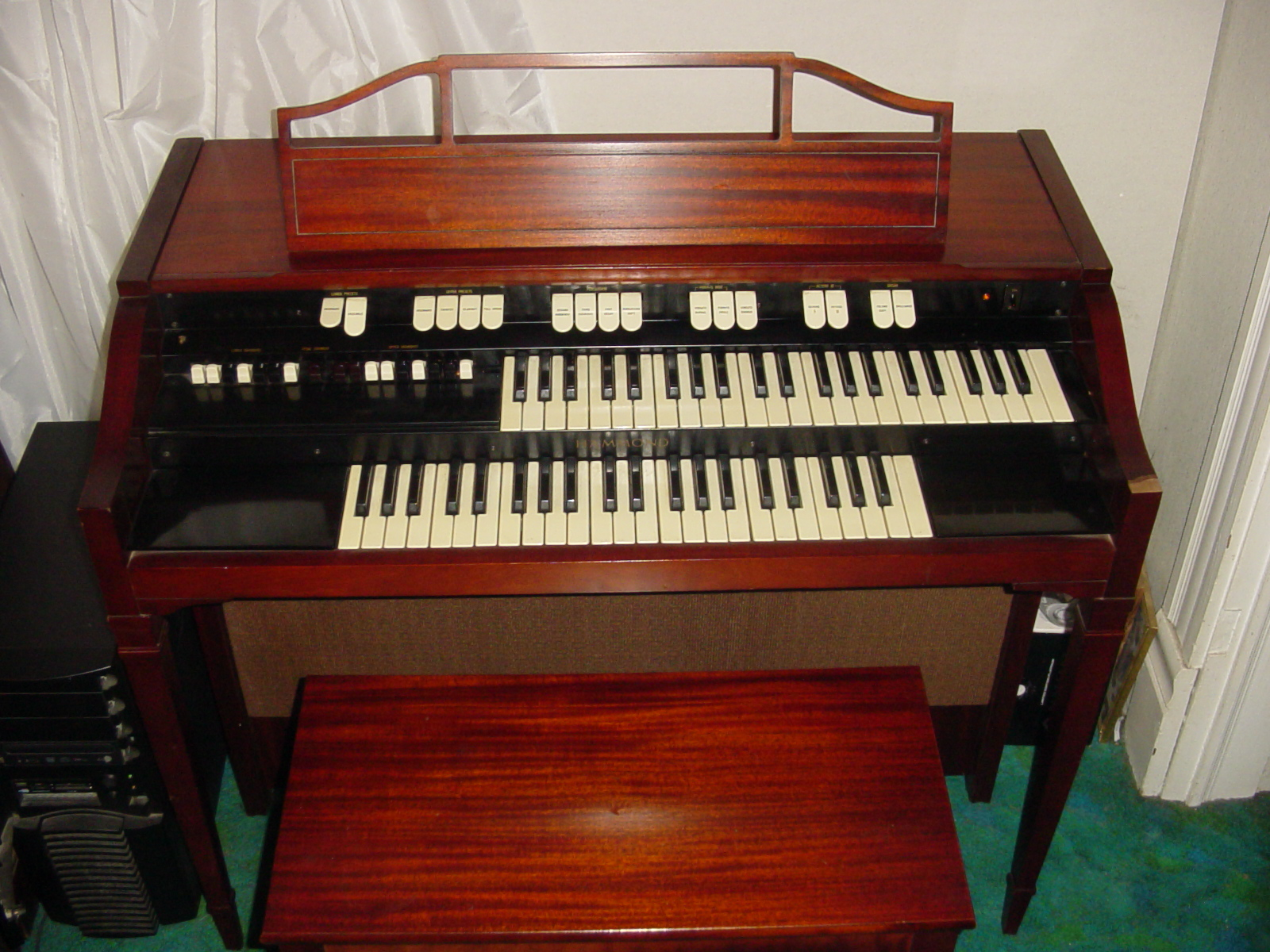
An L-series Hammond organ from the period 1961 to 1972

Mikrophonie II (Work Number 17), for choir, Hammond organ, and four ring modulators, like Mikrophonie I composed in moment form, also consists of 33 "moments", though, unlike the earlier work, their order is fixed in the score. The durations of these moments are made according to the Fibonacci series.

The work combines the electronically produced sounds of the Hammond organ with vocal sounds from the choir through ring modulation to produce transformations that in many places achieve distortions evoking wizardry (Frisius 2008, 167). Stockhausen's original idea had been to combine a choir with the tamtam from Mikrophonie I but the sounds proved too contrary, and so he settled on the Hammond organ instead.

The text used is Helmut Heißenbüttel's "nonsense" poem, "Einfache grammatische Meditationen" (Simple Grammatical Meditations), from Textbuch 1. Rather than following the text as printed, Stockhausen redistributes its 44 lines over the 33 moments of his composition in such a way that the six large sections of the poem are all present in all parts of the work, reflecting the text's pictorial, temporally simultaneous character in a manner "congenial to the poetic principal of the text itself".

The choir consists only of high and low voices: two sections each of sopranos and basses, who sit in an arc with their backs to the audience, facing the Hammond organ player at the back of the stage. Each section is picked up by a microphone and the signal is fed into one side of a ring modulator; the Hammond organ's output is fed into the other side. The sum and difference frequencies of the modulators' outputs are played back over four groups of loudspeakers, but the degree of modulation is controlled by potentiometers in order to produce gradations of transformation. Occasionally there are transitions from natural to artificial sound, or the reverse, at which points "sound windows" open, through which recorded excerpts from three of Stockhausen's earlier vocal compositions are played over a fifth loudspeaker group.

Mikrophonie II is interrupted eight times by coloured pauses (sections 2, 5, 8, 11, 17, 19, 20, 32): moments out of my earlier works Gesang der Jünglinge (Electronic Music 1955–56), Carré for 4 choirs and 4 orchestras (1959–60) and Momente for solo soprano, 4 choir groups and 13 instrumentalists (1962 to 1964) sound softly in the distance, and the choir singers of Mikrophonie II whisper synchronous and loudly to this. Vocal music of my past sounds through time-windows into the vocal music of my present. In the seventh time-window, music from Carré and Gesang der Jünglinge sounds simultaneously. (Liner notes to Stockhausen Complete Edition CD 9)

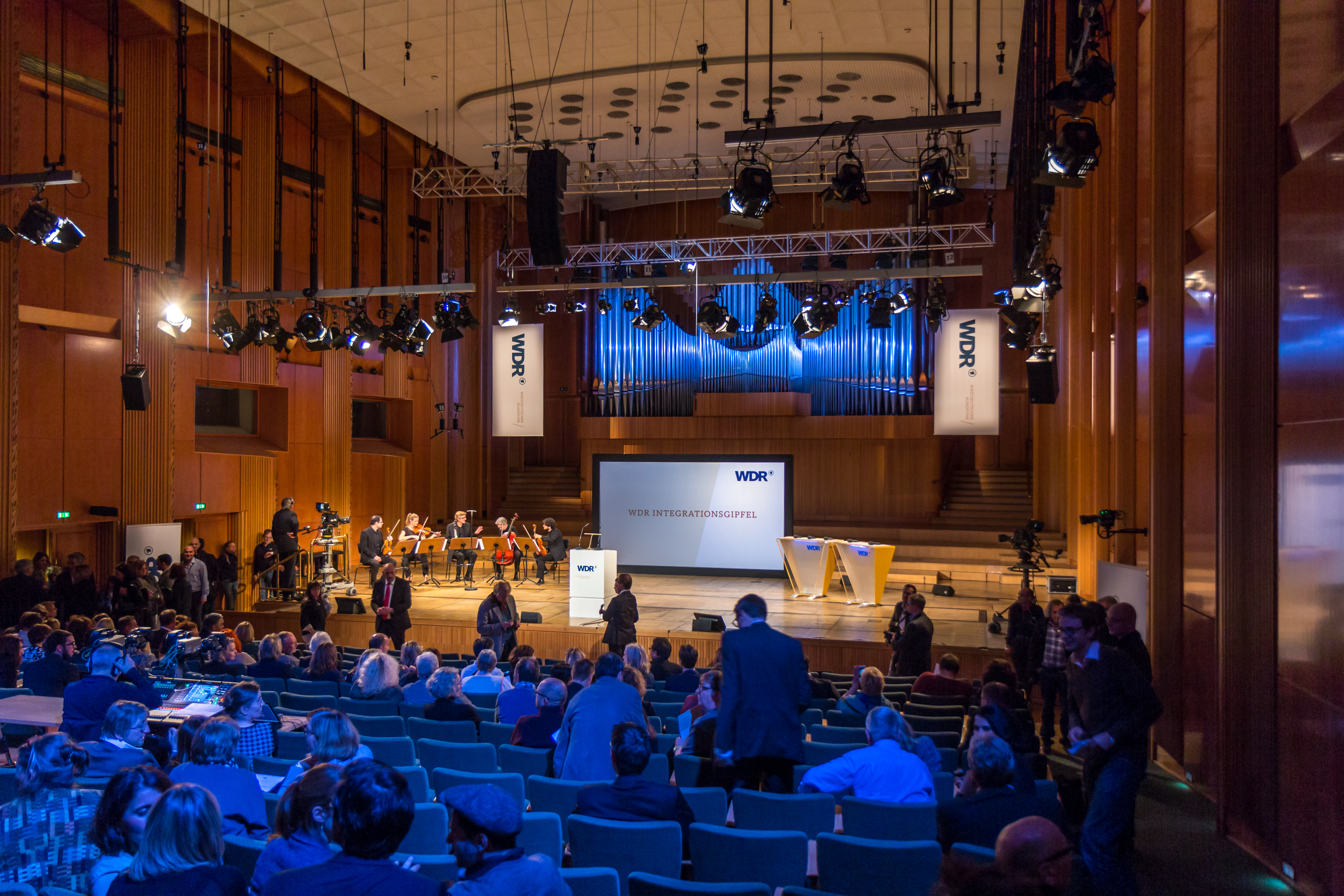
Großer Sendesaal of WDR in Cologne where Mikrophonie was first performed

Stockhausen remodels Heißenbüttel's text still further by the addition of interpretive directions for the singers, such as "solemn Levite chant", "à la jazz, cool, almost like a plucked double-bass, gradually transformed into: like a conceited snob", "like a baby", "like drunkards, sometimes bawling, with hiccups".

The result is a fusion of the suggestive and the concrete, of words and music, of vocalists and Hammond organ—a meditation on and reconfiguration of Heißenbüttel's text which does not destroy it but rather recreates it, so that free association may cause the listener's response to "vary between phantasmagorical visions and mathematical procedures".

The world première of Mikrophonie II took place on 11 June 1965 in a Musik der Zeit concert at the Große Sendesaal of WDR in Cologne. The score is dedicated to Judith Frehm (Pisar).

== Discography ==
Two recorded performances of Mikrophonie I by the Stockhausen ensemble have been released, but only one of Mikrophonie II, though the two compositions have always appeared together, on different labels and in different formats. The performers in the two versions of Mikrophonie I (both of the Brussels Version 1964) are:

1. Aloys Kontarsky and Christoph Caskel, tam-tam; Johannes G. Fritsch and Bernhard Kontarsky, microphones; Karlheinz Stockhausen, filter and potentiometers I; Jaap Spek, filter II; Hugh Davies, potentiometers II. (Recorded sometime between December 1964 and June 1965 at WDR.)
2. Aloys Kontarsky and Alfred Alings, tam-tam; Johannes G. Fritsch and Harald Bojé, microphones; Hugh Davies and Jaap Spek, filters; Karlheinz Stockhausen, sound projection (i.e., potentiometers). (Recorded 17 & 18 December 1965.)

The performers in Mikrophonie II are: Members of the WDR Choir and of the Studio Choir for New Music, Cologne, cond. Herbert Schernus; Alfons Kontarsky, Hammond organ; Johannes G. Fritsch, timer; Karlheinz Stockhausen, sound projection. (Recorded 10 June 1965).

The releases with the second performance of Mikrophonie I are:

- Stockhausen, Karlheinz. 1967. Mikrophonie I/Mikrophonie II. CBS 32 11 0044 / S77 230 / 72 647 (LP)
- Stockhausen, Karlheinz. 1975. Mikrophonie I/Mikrophonie II. Deutsche Grammophon DG 2530583 (LP)
- Stockhausen, Karlheinz. 1993. Klavierstücke I–XI Mikrophonie I & II. Sony Classical S2K 53346 (2 CDs) [Liner notes incorrectly claim the recording of Mikrophonie II is of the public performance on 11 June 1965.]
- Stockhausen, Karlheinz. 1995. Mikrophonie I and Mikrophonie II/Telemusik. Kürten: Stockhausen-Verlag. Stockhausen Edition 9 (CD).

The release with the earlier performance of Mikrophonie I is:

- Stockhausen, Karlheinz. 2007. Mikrophonie I 1964, Mikrophonie II 1965: 2 Vorträge. Kürten: Stockhausen-Verlag. Text-CD 14. Introductory lectures to each performance read by the composer, in German, recorded in 1965.

A more recent version has been released on:

- Stockhausen: Complete Early Percussion Works. Steven Schick, percussion James Avery, piano; Red Fish, Blue Fish (Ross Karre, Justin DeHart, Matthew Jenkins, Fabio Oliveira, Jonathan Hepfer, Gregory Stuart). CD recording, digital: 2 sound discs, stereo. Mode 274–275. New York: Mode Records, 2014.

== Filmography ==
- Brandt, Brian, and Michael Hynes (prod.). 2014. Stockhausen: Complete Early Percussion Works. Steven Schick, James Avery, Red Fish Blue Fish. DVD recording, region 0, NTSC, Dolby 5.1 surround/DTS 5.1 surround, aspect ratio 16:9, color. Mode 274. New York: Mode Records.
- Dhomme, Sylvain. 1966. Mikrophonie I (30 mins., colour). Studio recording of Mikrophonie I with the Stockhausen-Ensemble. Short introduction by Stockhausen in French and German.
