= Solo (Stockhausen) =

Solo for a melody instrument with feedback is a work for a soloist with live electronics (four technician assistants) composed in 1965–66 by Karlheinz Stockhausen. It is Nr. 19 in his catalogue of works. Performance duration can vary from 10½ to 19 minutes.

== History ==
Solo was first sketched in 1964 and is closely related to Plus-Minus, Momente, and Mikrophonie I. It was composed in March and April 1966 on a commission from the Japanese broadcasting network Nippon Hoso Kyokai and was premiered in two different versions on 25 April 1966 in a public concert at the NHK in Tokyo which also featured the world premiere of Stockhausen's Telemusik. The soloists were Yasusuke Hirata, trombone, and Ryū Noguchi, flute; the assisting technicians were Akira Honma, M. Nagano, Shigeru Satō, and the director of the NHK studio, Wataru Uenami. The score is dedicated to Alfred Schlee, the director of the Vienna branch of Universal Edition.

For the Tokyo premiere, a special table with adjustable guide rollers was constructed, to enable different delay times for the tape playback. In subsequent performances, a single tape was threaded through seven tape recorders, and eventually an apparatus was constructed especially for Solo in the Institute for Sonology at the University of Utrecht. However, this piece of equipment remained private property and was not made available for hire. By 1970, computers were already considered as a replacement for the tape delay, but was regarded prohibitively expensive.

Twenty years later, after initial difficulties, one such version was made at IRCAM in 1992, using Max/MSP on a NeXT Computer, and successfully performed in public in February and March 1993. In March 1998, this program was adapted to run on commercially available computers. Pre-programming on the computer can fulfill the functions originally assigned to the assistant technicians, thus requiring only a single assistant to control the sound. In notes for a 2002 performance also using a computerised system, Stockhausen acknowledged the IRCAM version, emphasising that it was done live, but nevertheless concluded that "It will still be a long time until young musicians ... will be able to learn the interpretation of SOLO with suitable mobile apparatuses." Bass clarinetist Jason Alder performed Solo in June 2010 in Amsterdam, and subsequently in later concerts, in this way. By developing a Max/MSP patch to run on his laptop, he is able to perform the piece anywhere without the original equipment constraints.

== Analysis ==
Feedback (Rückkopplung) in this case refers to tape delay, through which music played by the soloist is made to return after periods of time specified in six different form plans, one of which is to be chosen for any performance. The performer is given six pages of conventionally notated material constituting the "content" of the work, and selects material according to certain criteria, playing it into a stereo pair of microphones that feed into the tape-loop system. Three assistants choose one or both recording channels, the degree of feedback, and the level of sound to be emitted from the speakers. This results in a regular though transformed periodic recurrence of the initial material, while the soloist adds new material over it. The system of the feedback plan therefore is the piece, since any musical relationships present on the sheets of music are destroyed by the atomisation and reorganisation created by this system.

== Performance practice ==
Stockhausen discovered early on that the originally imagined spontaneous performance of Solo was far more difficult than expected. Consequently, versions prepared in advance were used from the outset, following Stockhausen's suggestions. In the first commercial recording, with Vinko Globokar on trombone, Stockhausen supplemented the live performance with excerpts from his electronic composition Hymnen, following the method he had already used in Mikrophonie II, where he inserted tape recordings of his own previous compositions. In the case of the trombone recording of Solo, this involved a lengthy section from the Second Region of Hymnen, including its prefatory "bridge". The trombone phrases are initially answered by electro-acoustically distorted military-band sounds of the German national anthem, similar to the way in which sounds from Gesang der Jünglinge, Carré, and Momente played back on tape answer the technologically alienated live voices of the mixed choir in Mikrophonie II. By 1969, Stockhausen had also taken to merging Solo with other works in a single composite performance.

== Discography ==
- Karlheinz Stockhausen: Solo, für Melodie-Instrument mit Rückkopplung; Vinko Globokar: Discours II pour cinq trombones; Luciano Berio: Sequenza V; Carlos Roqué Alsina: Consecuenza. Vinko Globokar (trombone). Avant Garde. LP recording. Deutsche Grammophon Gesellschaft 137 005. [Hamburg]: Deutsche Grammophon Gesellschaft 1969.
- Stockhausen, Karlheinz: Solo (Version für Flöte); Solo (Version für Synthesizer); Spiral (Version für Oboe). Dietmar Wiesner (flute), Simon Stockhausen (synthesizer), Catherine Milliken (oboe). CD recording. Stockhausen Complete Edition CD 45. Kürten: Stockhausen-Verlag, 1995.
- Knut Sønstevold, bassoon. Knut Sønstevold; Miklós Maros; Carel Brons; Arne Mellnäs; Lars-Gunnar Bodin; Karlheinz Stockhausen; Sten Hanson. [Solo recorded at Danviken Hospital Church, 23–26 June 1977]. LP recording Fylkingen Records FYLP 1011. [Stockholm]: Fylkingen Records, 1977.
- Sönstevold Plays Stockhausen. Karlheinz Stockhausen: Solo, In Freundschaft, Spiral, Tierkreis. Knut Sønstevold (bassoon); Kina Sønstevold (piano). Nosag CD 042; [Solo recorded by Swedish Radio on 4 October 1985 during the EAM Festival, Berwaldhallen]. [Sweden]: Nosag Records, 2000.
