= Telemusik =

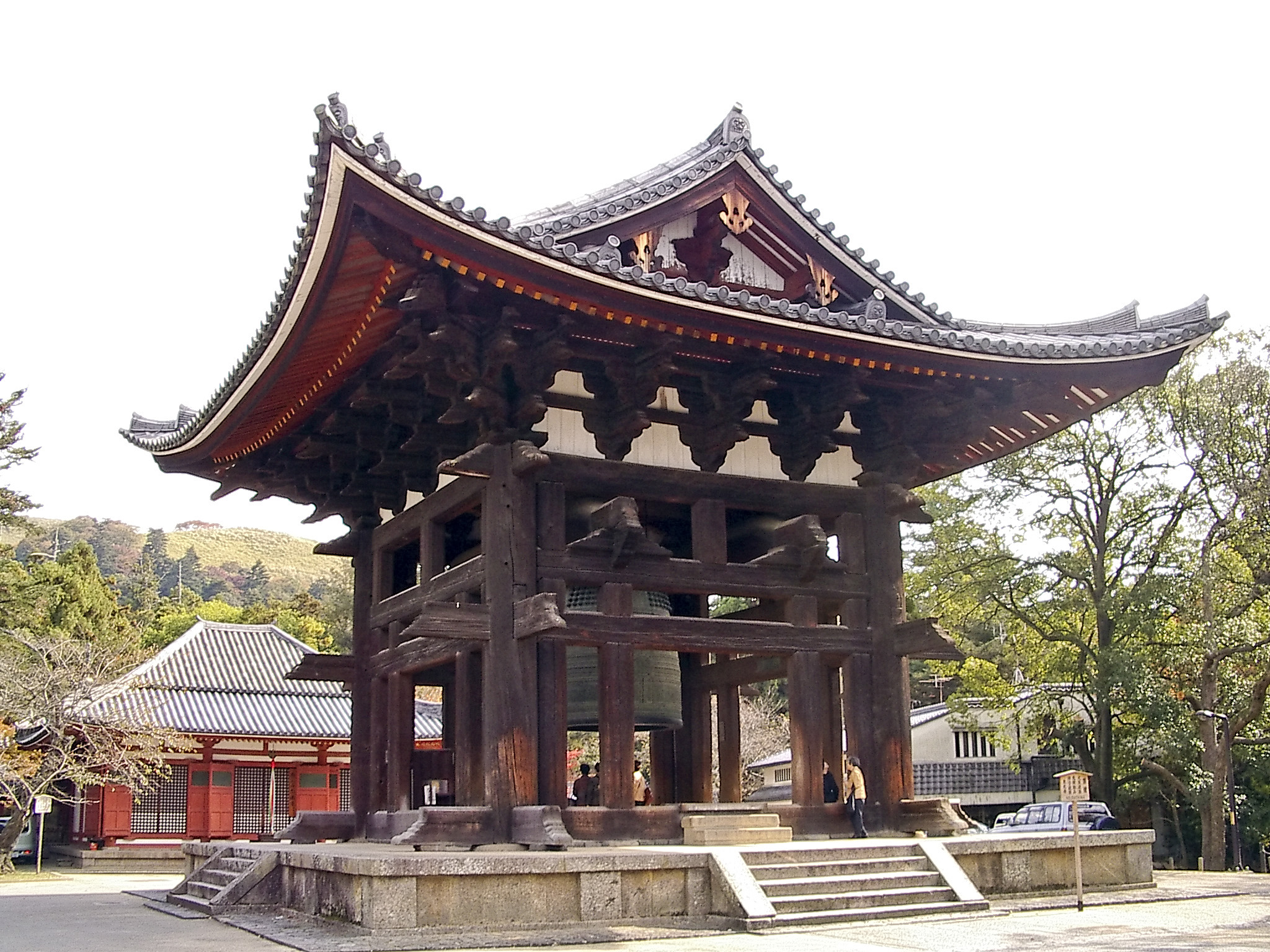
The belfry at Tōdai-ji in Nara, containing one of the four large bronze bells used in moment 31 of Telemusik

Telemusik is a 1966 electronic composition by Karlheinz Stockhausen, and is number 20 in his catalog of works.

== History ==
Through his composition student Makoto Shinohara, Stockhausen was invited by the NHK to visit Tokyo and carry out two commissions in their electronic music studio, in connection with the 50th anniversary of the founding of NHK in 1965. Because of other commitments, Stockhausen was unable to meet this schedule, but finally, under pressure from Tokyo, flew to Japan on 19 January 1966. According to a note in the score,

Telemusik was realized between January 23 and March 2, 1966 in the Studio for Electronic Music of the Japanese broadcasting system Nippon Hoso Kyokai (NHK), in collaboration with the director of the studio, Wataru Uenami and the studio technicians Hiroshi Shiotani, Shigeru Satô and Akira Honma.

The score is dedicated to the Japanese people. The first public performance took place at the NHK studios in Tokyo on 25 April 1966, in a program which also featured the first and second performances (in versions for trombone and for flute) of Stockhausen's other NHK commission, Solo.

== Materials and concepts ==
The substance of the work consists of recordings of a variety of traditional ethnic musics from around the world, together with electronically generated sounds. More than twenty of these recorded fragments are ring modulated with electronic sounds and with each other to produce "odd hybrid-types"—modulating, for example, "the chant of monks in a Japanese temple with Shipibo music from the Amazon, and then further impos[ing] a rhythm of Hungarian music on the melody of the monks. In this way, symbiotic things can be generated, which have never before been heard". Only seven of the work's thirty-two moments—nos. 1, 2, 4, 6, 8, 10, and 16—are restricted entirely to electronic sounds. The pitch range is deliberately kept rather high, between 6 and 12 kilohertz, so that the intermodulation can occasionally project sounds downwards through heterodyning, rendering sections "that seem to be so far away because the ear cannot analyse it" within "the normal audible range". In this way, register becomes a means of bringing the “distant” close up (Greek tele, "afar, far off", as in "telephone" or "television"), the concept from which the title of the work is derived.

The work was created using a six-track tape recorder custom-built for the NHK studios. One track was reserved for editing during production, with the completed music being intended for playback in five channels arranged in a circle around the audience. However, there are none of the spatialization techniques found in some of Stockhausen's other electronic works, such as Kontakte, Sirius, or Oktophonie. The spatial conception of Telemusik is therefore closer to that of Gesang der Jünglinge, which was also originally in five channels. For performances elsewhere, Stockhausen mixed down several stereo copies, using a panorama console to approximately position the five channels from left to right as I IV III II V.

== Form ==
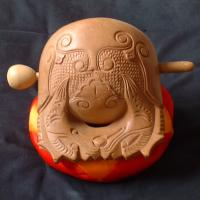
A mokugyo (木魚) marks the beginning of moments 3, 9, 15, 21, and 27.

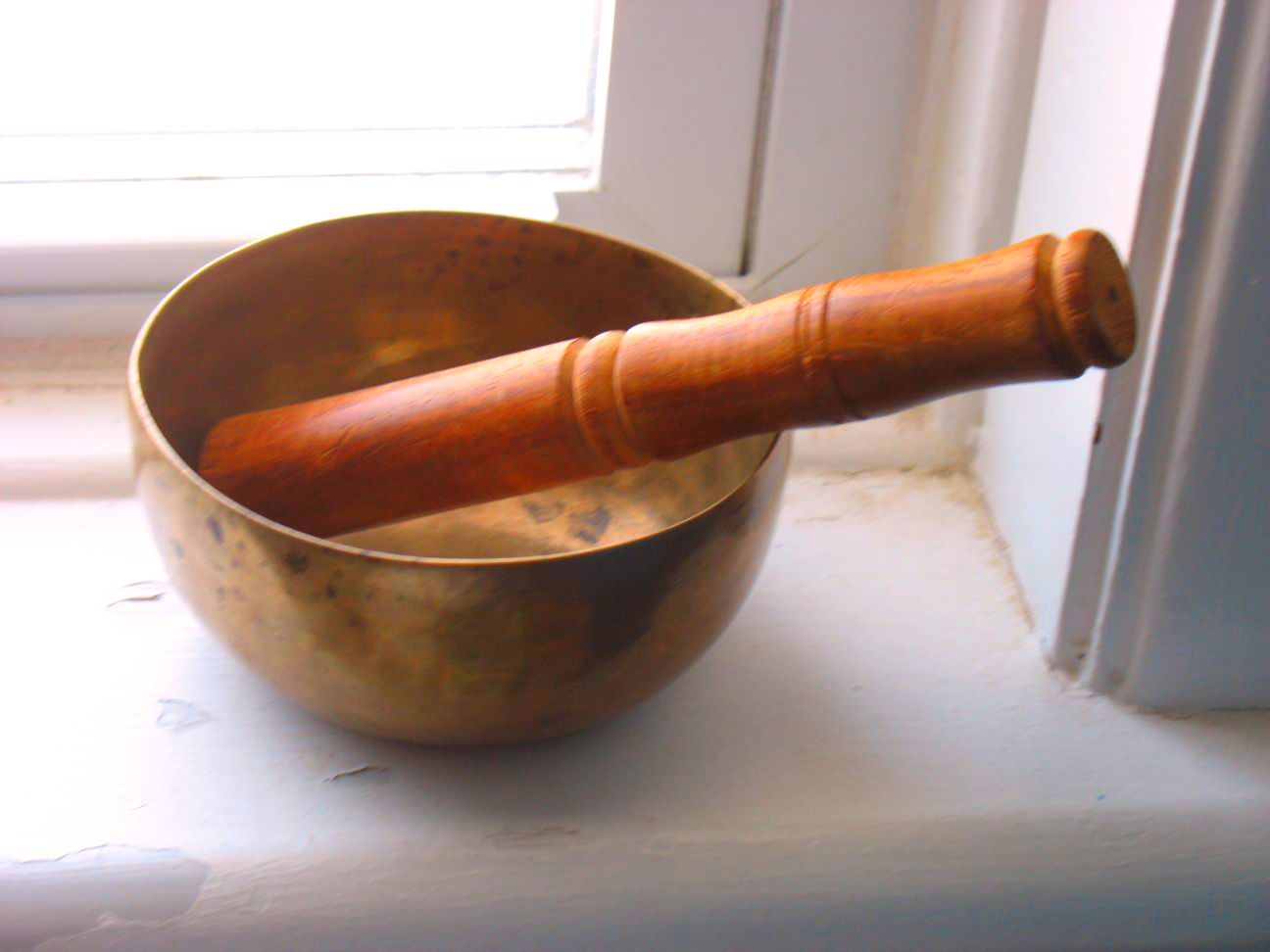
A Japanese rin marks the beginning of moments 8, 16, and 24.

The principal forming element of Telemusik is duration. The work consists of thirty-two structures, called "moments" by the composer. Each begins with the stroke of a Japanese temple instrument. These six instruments are each associated with a moment duration according to their natural decay time: the taku (a high-pitched sandalwood clapper with almost instantaneous decay) with the shortest duration, the bokushō (a larger clapper with longer decay time) with the next longer duration, then a hollow-sounding mokugyo ("wooden fish"), higher and lower-pitched cup gongs called rin and keisu, ending with a group of four large temple bells for the longest of the six durations used. The durations in seconds of these moments are taken from the six Fibonacci numbers between 13 and 144. The numbers of occurrences of these steps are also drawn from Fibonacci numbers, from 1 to 13. The longer the step, the fewer times it occurs, and vice versa:

144 × 1
89 × 2
55 × 3
34 × 5
21 × 8
13 × 13

However, the actual duration values used in the score are systematically varied above these base values so that from longest to shortest there are 1, 2, 3, 4, 3, and 2 variants (144, 89/91, 55/56/57, 34/35/36/37, 21/22/23, and 13/14). In order to achieve the specified numbers of moments, the variants of the shorter values are duplicated, again according to the Fibonacci series (13 × 5, 14 × 8; 21 × 3, 22 × 3, 23 × 2; 34 × 2, and the rest with single instances).

Distribution of moments in Telemusik
identifying instrument	duration (secs.)	no. of occurrences	total durations (secs.)
temple bells	144	1	144
keisu	89/91	1 + 1 = 2	180
rin	55/56/57	1 + 1 + 1 = 3	168
mokugyo	34/35/36/37	2 + 1 + 1 + 1 = 5	176
bokushō	21/22/23	3 + 3 + 2 = 8	175
taku	13/14	5 + 8 = 13	177

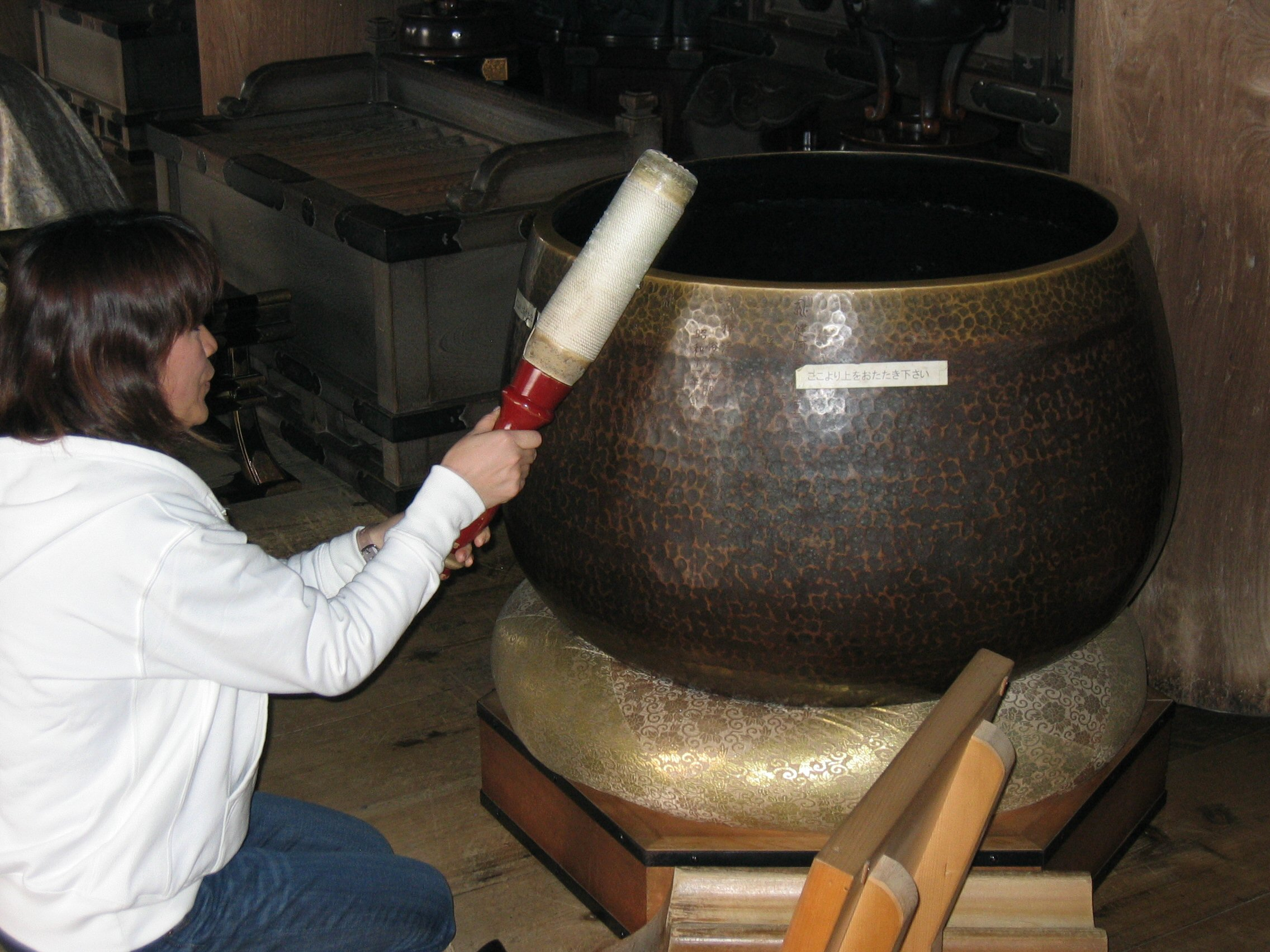
A keisu announces moments 11 and 22.

Each of the 32 moments is then subdivided into from two to thirteen subsections, again using Fibonacci numbers, in most cases with some values repeated. For example, one of the composer's sketches (reproduced in Erbe 2004, 146) shows that moment 22, with a total duration of 91 seconds, has subdivisions of 34 + 21 + 13 + 8 + 5 + 3 + 2 + 1 + 2 + 1 + 1, though not used in that order in the composition itself.

The moments' durations are distributed over the length of the composition as follows:

	taku	bokushō	mokugyo	rin	keisu	temple bells	cumulative durations
1		21					21
2	13						34
3			34				68
4	14						82
5		22					104
6	13						117
7	14						131
7 cont'd	13 + 14						158
8				55			213
9			35				248
10		21					269
11					89		358
12	13						371
13		23					394
14	14						408
15		↕	37				445
16				↕ 57	↑		502
17		22			↓		524
18	13		↕				537
19	14						551
20		23					574
21			36				610
22					91		701
23	14						715
24				56			771
25		21					792
26	14						806
27			34				840
28	14						854
29		22					876
30	14						890
31						144	1034
32	13						1047

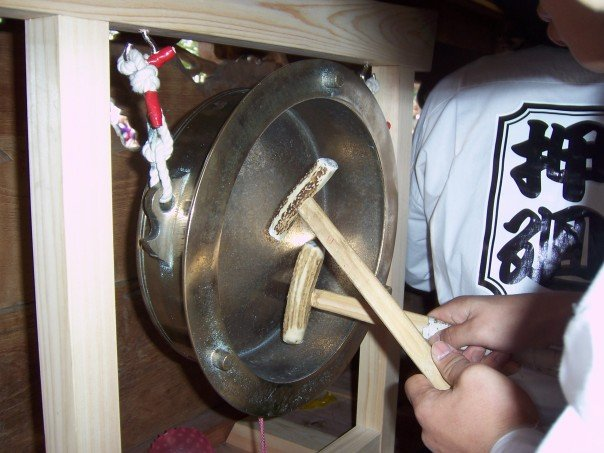
A kane introduces the inserted moment "7 Fortsetzung".

The "extra" moment marked "7 Fortsetzung" (7 continued) is an insertion which repeats the long composite of descending glissandos from the two preceding moments, ring modulated with a 12 kHz sine wave, briefly "notched" with a dip to 2,000 Hz at the point corresponding to the division between moments 6 and 7. This insert is marked at the beginning by a stroke on a Japanese temple instrument found nowhere else in Telemusik: a gong called a kane (鐘). Of the six resulting structural layers, or "formant rhythms" four—the second, third, fourth, and fifth—are internally symmetrical. However, their centres of symmetry, marked in the table by the symbol "↕", do not coincide, so that the composite structure is not itself symmetrical. The keisu layer is centred on the overall form, while the rin, mokugyo, and bokusho layers are phase-shifted by incrementally increasing distances to the left, right, and left again.

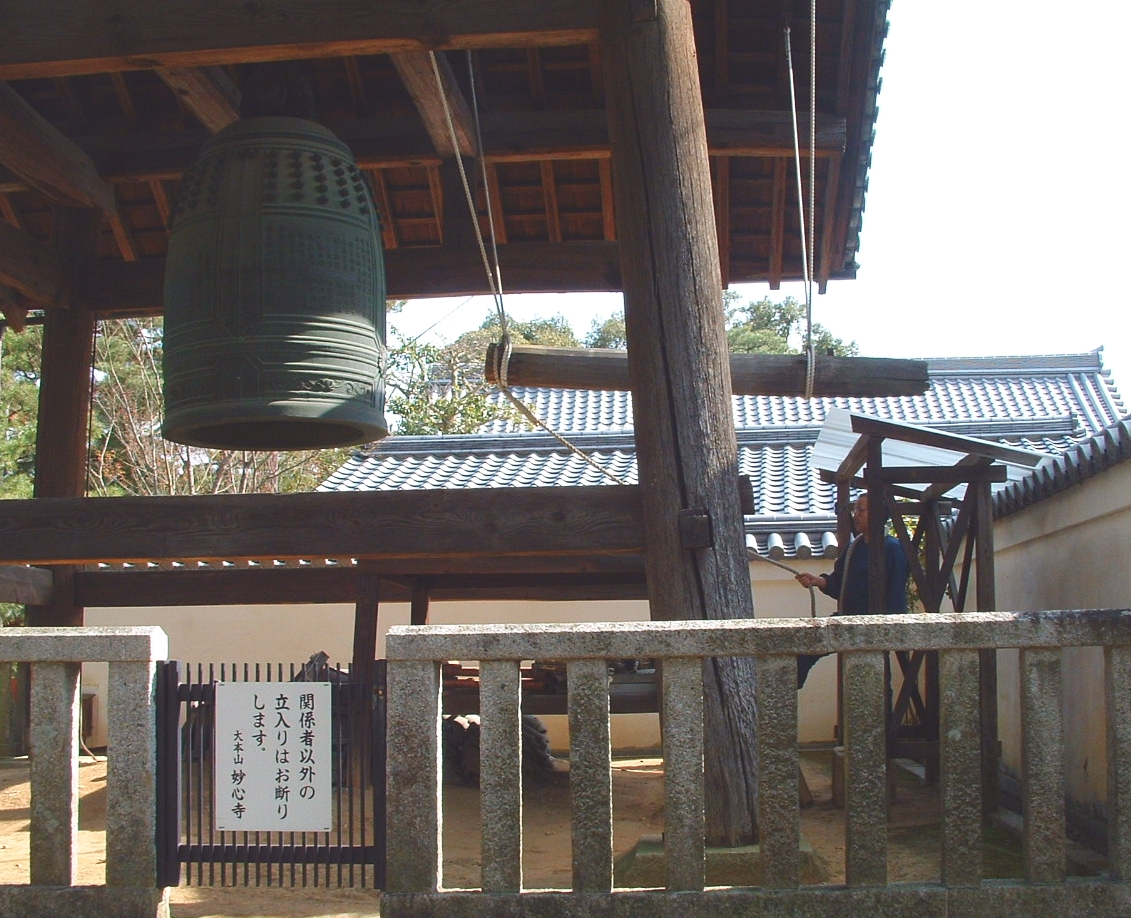
Bronze bell at Myōshin-ji (Kyoto), one of the four bells heard in moment 31

Moments are often more or less casually grouped together into successions of two or more moments, similar to the Hauptgruppen Stockhausen conceived as early as Klavierstück I in 1952. Opinions on these groupings differ somewhat. Robin Maconie describes moments 15, 16 and 17 as a "structural episode" consisting of a sustained "resonance of consciousness", superimposing and transforming material taken from moments 1, 4, 5, 6, 7, 9, and 14. Others variously regard as groupings:

- moments 1–3
- moments 5–7 cont'd, 10–11, 17–23, and 27–31
- moments 12–14 and 24–26
- moments 16–21, 22–23, and 27–30

== Discography ==
- DG LP 643546 (with Mixtur, small ensemble 1967, backwards version)
- Stockhausen Complete Edition CD 9 (with Mikrophonie I and Mikrophonie II)
- Stockhausen Text-CD 16 (remastered November 2007)
