= Moment form =

In music, moment form is defined as "a mosaic of moments", and, in turn, a moment is defined as a "self-contained (quasi-)independent section, set off from other sections by discontinuities".

== History and definition ==
The concept of moment form, and the specific term, originated with the composition Kontakte (1958–60) by Karlheinz Stockhausen.

A "moment", in Stockhausen's terminology, is any "formal unit in a particular composition that is recognizable by a personal and unmistakable character." It can be either an indivisible gestalt, a structure with clear components, or a mixture of the two; and it can be static, or dynamic, or a combination of the two. "Depending on their characteristics, they can be as long or as short as you like".

"Moment forming", on the other hand, is a compositional approach in which a narrative overall line is deliberately avoided. The component moments in such a form are related by a nonlinear principle of proportions. If this system of proportions exhausts a set of possibilities, the form is said to be "closed"; if not, or if the series of proportions is not finite, then the form is "open".

Moment form does not necessarily avoid perceptible goal-directed processes. "They simply refuse to participate in a globally directed narrative curve, which is, naturally, not their purpose". In Stockhausen's words, works with this property

neither aim at the climax, nor at prepared (and consequently expected) multiple climaxes, and the usual introductory, rising, transitional and fading-away stages are not delineated in a development curve encompassing the entire duration of the work. On the contrary, these forms are immediately intense and seek to maintain the level of continued "main points", which are constantly equally present, right up until they stop. In these forms a minimum or a maximum may be expected in every moment, and no developmental direction can be predicted with certainty from the present one; they have always already commenced, and could continue forever; in them either everything present counts, or nothing at all; and each and every Now is not unremittingly regarded as the mere consequence of the one which preceded it and as the upbeat to the coming one—in which one puts one's hope—but rather as something personal, independent and centred, capable of existing on its own. They are forms in which an instant does not have to be just a bit of a temporal line, nor a moment just a particle of a measured duration, but rather in which concentration on the Now—on every Now—makes vertical slices, as it were, that cut through a horizontal temporal conception to a timelessness I call eternity: an eternity that does not begin at the end of time but is attainable in every moment. I am speaking of musical forms in which apparently nothing less is being attempted than to explode (even to overthrow) the temporal concept—or, put more accurately: the concept of duration. ... In works of this kind the start and stop are open and yet they cease after a certain duration.

== Representative works ==
Besides Kontakte, works cited by Stockhausen as being particularly concerned with moment forming include the earlier Gesang der Jünglinge (1955–56), as well as the subsequent Carré (1960), Momente (1962–64/69), Mixtur (1964), Mikrophonie I (1964), Mikrophonie II (1965), Telemusik (1966), Hymnen (1966–67/69), Stimmung (1968), Samstag aus Licht (1981–83), Michaelion from Mittwoch aus Licht, Himmelfahrt (2004–05), Freude (2005), and Himmels-Tür (2005). The concept of moment form has often been confused with mobile (or, in Stockhausen's nomenclature, "polyvalent") forms, because in four of these compositions (Momente, Mixtur, Mikrophonie I, and Stimmung), the component moments can be ordered in different ways. Several other works by Stockhausen have this "mobile" feature, without falling into his category of moment form, for example, Klavierstück XI (1956), Refrain (1959), Zyklus (1959), and Sirius (1975–77).

Certain works by other composers, both earlier and contemporaneous, such as István Anhalt, Earle Brown, Elliott Carter, Barney Childs, Roberto Gerhard, Michael Gielen, Hans Werner Henze, Charles Ives, Witold Lutosławski, Olivier Messiaen, Morgan Powell, Roger Reynolds, Joseph Schwantner, Roger Sessions, Igor Stravinsky, Anton Webern, Stefan Wolpe, Yehuda Yannay, and Frank Zappa, have also been cited as instances of moment form .
