= Operation Re-Information =

Electronic Music Band

- Four members of ORI performing on stage at the Metro Cafe in Washington DC, 1998.

Background information
- Instrument(s): Apple Powerbook Notebooks, keyboards, synthesizers, theremin, guitar, hacked toys
- Years active: 1994-2000
- Labels: O.R.I. Records, M-Pire Recordings, Vinyl Communications
- Past members: Mark Stramaglia, Andy Vogt, Veronica Polo, Oliver Kollar, Robert Del Bueno

Operation Re-Information (O.R.I.), also known as Revo, was an electronic band from Pittsburgh, Pennsylvania, United States, recognized for pioneering the genre of laptronica, a performance modality where laptops are used as instruments on stage. The group utilized their own custom-built software and played computer keyboards strapped around them like guitars to trigger music samples. The songs were often noisy and repetitive and had a raw punk aesthetic. Beyond the confines of pre-sequenced digital music, O.R.I. transformed computers into dynamic stage instruments. The band was often compared to Kraftwerk and Devo.

O.R.I. adopted a satirical business persona as a critique of corporate culture. They often performed wearing business suits and were fond of handing out business cards to fans and delivering absurdist corporate motivational speeches on stage. In interviews, they would often reiterate that rather than music, their primary goal was “information control through the science of re-information.”

== Members ==
The core members of the group were Dr. Spanglestein (Mark Stramaglia), Dr. Everett T. Spectt (Andy Vogt), and Agent Triplex (Veronica Polo). Professor Swank (Oliver Kollar) accompanied with guitar from 1994-1996. Dr. Dale Braino (Robert del Bueno) from Atlanta-based surf-rock group Man or Astroman? was also an important collaborator from 1998 to 2000.

== History ==
In the early 90s, Stramaglia, Vogt, Kollar, and Polo met while undergraduates at Carnegie Mellon University’s College of Fine Arts. Stramaglia and Vogt were often found in the video editing cluster and developed an interest in sampling sci-fi movies with an Akai sampler and Mac sound editor with much of the material being edited on VHS. Between 1989 and 1993 they created about 30 songs that due to data size could only be recorded on cassettes. Eventually, the pair decided to put together a live performance and in May 1994 they held a show at the C.M.U. Forbes Gallery, where Polo, Kollar, and other friends such as fellow artists Sarah Smith and Kshanti Green joined in. The set-up included two macintoshes and a plethora of synthesizers, cheap toys with sound effects, as well as a hacked version of the children's software "Rock Rap 'n Roll," which was adapted to trigger custom samples.

The nascent band operated under the name Revo, a nod to their conceptual art theory "Reinformation" and a playful reference to one of their musical influences, the band Devo. That year, the band unveiled their inaugural release, a 7" vinyl album plainly named "Revo" featuring six songs.

During the next three years, the group continued to develop their musical ideas but performed infrequently as their large array of equipment made live shows cumbersome. The set-up during this time included a multitude of analog synthesizers such as Korgs, Arps, Yamahas, Moogs, Prophets, theremins, and hacked toys. Kollar, an early member of the group, added his guitar to live performances, the only traditional rock instrument in the ensemble. During this time, Revo mainly performed in local venues alongside friends like the acclaimed Pittsburgh instrumental rock group, Don Caballero. The members of Revo were part of an extended vibrant art and music community in Pittsburgh, and the vehicles for artistic expression were multi-faceted. This extended to the member’s day jobs where Stramaglia worked for a software company, Polo as a virtual world designer for a virtual reality company, and Vogt as a prop master for Mr. Roger’s Neighborhood.

From the group’s inception, Stramaglia had been on a fruitless quest for software that would allow the group to trigger samples from a portable computer. With a background in programming, he eventually took the initiative to create the software himself. A beta version of the group’s signature Back to Basics software was tested live in a concert with Don Caballero in October 1994. Over the next few years the software would continue to evolve and would be used in conjunction with other instruments.

Eventually, the software would become a tool that fundamentally altered how the group performed on stage. In February 1997 REVO had the opportunity to tour the East Coast, playing some shows with Man or Astroman and others with Trans Am. With the capability to load all of their sounds onto their computers, the band streamlined their stage setup, down to three laptops and two synthesizers. Eventually, the group would phaze out all extraneous equipment and tour with Apple Powerbook Notebooks alone, a statement in electronic minimalism.

In April, the group also welcomed Dr. Dale Braino (Robert Del Bueno), alternatively known as Coco the Electronic Monkey Wizard from Man or Astroman? to the collective. Though Del Bueno resided in Atlanta, he collaborated remotely and joined the group on tours. Around this time, O.R.I. also put out a split LP with Man or Astroman?'s sister group Servotron, titled Product for Mass Consumption. In June 1997, the group changed its name definitively from REVO to Operation Re-Information. During interviews, and never breaking out of character, the group stated that “the REVO division of Operation Re-Information was dissolved due to corporate cutbacks.”

In August, the group put out its first full-length CD titled Ctrl, making reference to both the computer key and the ability to control sound and information. To promote their new album, the group went on a tour of the West Coast with Servotron. During this tour, O.R.I. was able to perform live in the theater of Apple Computer headquarters in Cupertino, California, showcasing their use of Apple laptops as instruments to Apple staff.

ORI performing at Apple's Town Hall Auditorium in Cupertino CA in 1998.

Over time, their pioneering performance style began to attract increasing media attention. In February 1998, Wired magazine wrote, “This nerd-pop supergroup has reinvented the next generation of electronica.” In January 1999, the group was featured on the cover of InPittsburgh Magazine which elevated their status in their adopted city. The in-depth feature article was written by music writer Manny Theiner who had been shadowing the group on tours and had accumulated an insider perspective on the group's lifestyle and artistic process.

Between 1998 and 1999 there were a flurry of releases. In 1998, the six-song EP Variable Dump was released through M-Pire Recordings. That same year, Ultramundane, a 7-song EP, came out via Vinyl Communications. In 1999, their second full-length album, Universal Standard 84000 was released, also by Vinyl Communications.

In 2000, due to diverging paths, the group members decided to disband. While the ensemble never reached mainstream fame, its influence was undeniable. In Pitchfork Magazine, American disc jockey Girl Talk named O.R.I. as a huge early influence on him and the album “Ctrl” as his all-time favorite album.

== Software ==
The group used software written by Mark Stramaglia called BackToBasics. It featured looping, pitch-bending, volume-fading, and stereo panning. Each member loaded up preset samples to their individual computers, then played them manually on their keyboards. Each member had a unique set of samples which they had to match to the other set of samples by ear, in the same manner as a traditional rock band. Between songs, the group members would turn to their computers and load the next set of samples. The samples ranged from synth sounds to snippets from films.

The software went on to win awards and was featured in the Computer Music Journal. It was also used by other groups, DJs, and performance artists including Man or Astroman?, Salaryman, TV Pow, and Miranda July. Duran Duran's keyboardist Nick Rhodes triggered samples with Back to Basics on a live Tonight Show appearance.

== Website ==
The group’s website (the now defunct reinformation.com) was also an outlet for the creative collective, showcasing both music and digital art. It also included free downloads of their software. In 1998 Magnet magazine named O.R.I. winner of the 1998 Best Band Website Award.

== Discography ==
=== Albums ===
- Ctrl CD (O.R.I. Records - 1997)
- Ultramundane CD (Vinyl Communications -1998)
- Variable Dump CD, (M-Pire recordings - 1998)
- Universal Standard 84000 CD (Vinyl Communications - 1999)

=== Split Singles ===
- Product for Mass Consumption, LP (MJ12 - 1997)

=== Singles (as REVO) ===
- REVO (SSS #49, 1996)

=== Compilation Albums ===
- Chunklet OS 14 Chunklet - 1998)

=== Cassettes ===
- REVO
- HQ

=== Floppy Disks ===
- (Various releases)
