= Josef Protschka =

German singer (born 1944)

- Born: 5 February 1944 (age 82); Prague
- Occupations: Operatic tenor; Academic voice teacher
- Organizations: Cologne Opera; Hochschule für Musik und Tanz Köln
- Website: josefprotschka.com

Josef Protschka (born 5 February 1944) is a German operatic tenor who also sang lieder and oratorio and made many recordings. He performed as the vocal soloist in Stockhausen's electronic composition Gesang der Jünglinge at age 12. A long-term member of the Cologne Opera, he appeared at international opera houses and festivals, with a focus on Mozart's roles such as Tamino. As an academic voice teacher, he was rector of the Hochschule für Musik und Tanz Köln from 2002 to 2009.

== Early life and education ==
Born in Prague, Protschka grew up in Düsseldorf. His father was a violinist who played in church orchestras. In 1956 at the age of 12, he performed as the vocal soloist in Stockhausen's electronic composition Gesang der Jünglinge, prepared by two years of studies and tape sessions with the composer. A year earlier he had already sung the student in Kurt Weill's Der Jasager as part of a recording of the work for the American label MGM.

Initially he studied classical philology, philosophy, German studies and literature. He worked as a journalist and in adult education. Soon he devoted himself exclusively to his singing career, studying in Cologne with Erika Köth and Peter Witsch.

== Career ==
He was first engaged as a lyric tenor at the Theater Gießen, where his first role was Tamino in Mozart's Die Zauberflöte. In 1978, he moved to the Stadttheater Saarbrücken and then in 1980 to the Cologne Opera. He appeared in the Mozart cycle staged by Jean-Pierre Ponnelle, as Tamino, as Ferrando in Così fan tutte, and in the title roles of Idomeneo and Titus. He received international recognition, appearing at the Salzburg Festival, La Scala in Milan, the Dresden Semper Opera, the Hamburg State Opera, La Monnaie in Brussels, the Royal Opera House in London and other European opera houses. At the Zürich Opera House, he repeated the Mozart cycle, and performed in the Monteverdi cycle staged by Ponnelle and conducted by Nikolaus Harnoncourt. He appeared at the Vienna State Opera as Eisenstein in Die Fledermaus by Johann Strauss, Hans in Smetana's Die veraufte Braut, Tamino, Florestan in Beethoven's Fidelio, and in the title role of Schubert's Fierrabras, among others.

Over the years, Protschka made about 50 recordings as well as television and radio productions and won international prizes. A recording of Fierrabras with him in the title role was nominated for a Grammy Award as best opera recording. He retired from the stage in 2016.

At the end of the 1990s, Protschka became a university lecturer in Copenhagen and Cologne and gave master classes in several European countries. He was a professor of voice in Aachen. In 2002 he was appointed rector of the Hochschule für Musik Köln, while continuing to teach. He retired from the position in 2009.

Protschka has continued to give recitals and concerts and to serve as a jury member of international competitions. He has run a studio for vocal interpretation. Together with Florian Uhlig, Protschka has directed an innovative educational project for talented South African singers, in collaboration between the International Mozart Festival Johannesburg and the Hochschule für Musik und Tanz Köln since 2012.
