= Mixtur =

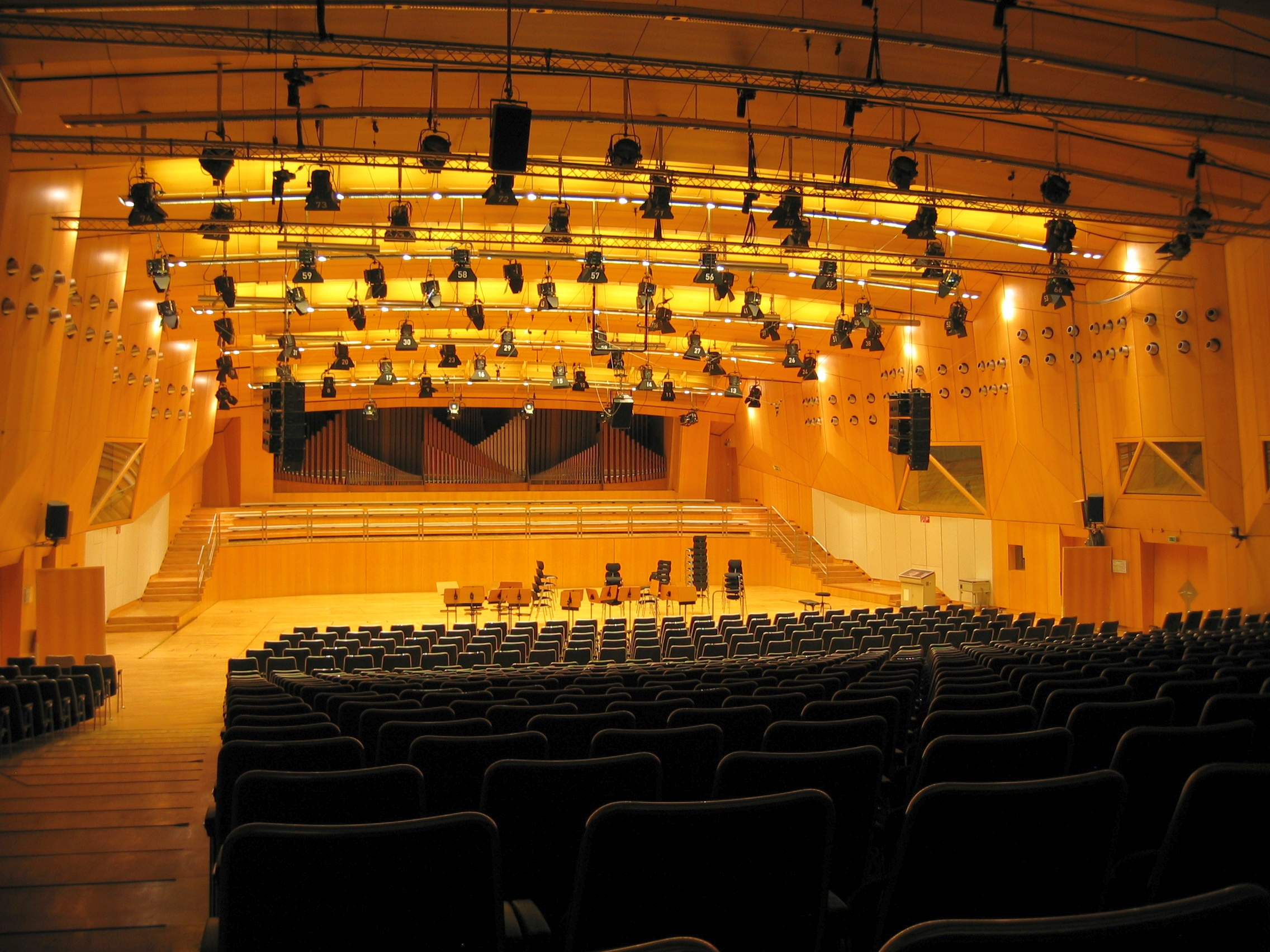
Broadcasting hall of the Hessischer Rundfunk, where the small-orchestra version of Mixtur was premiered in 1967

Mixtur, for orchestra, 4 sine-wave generators, and 4 ring modulators, is an orchestral composition by the German composer Karlheinz Stockhausen, written in 1964, and is Nr. 16 in his catalogue of works. It exists in three versions: the original version for full orchestra, a reduced scoring made in 1967 (Nr. 16 1/2), and a re-notated version of the reduced scoring, made in 2003 and titled Mixtur 2003, Nr. 16 2/3.

== History ==
Mixtur is one of the earliest compositions for orchestra with live electronics, and is amongst the first compositions using live-electronic techniques generally.

The original version for large orchestra was premiered on 9 November 1965 at the Norddeutscher Rundfunk, Hamburg. The version for reduced orchestra was premiered in the large broadcasting hall of the Hessischer Rundfunk, Frankfurt am Main, as part of the Darmstädter Ferienkurse on 23 August 1967 by the Ensemble Hudba Dneska conducted by Ladislav Kupkovič, to whom this version is dedicated.

Pierre Boulez conducted a number of performances of Mixtur from the early seventies to as late as 10 June 1982 (at the Théâtre du Châtelet, Paris, with the Ensemble InterContemporain), but was not happy with the score and problems with rehearsals and performances led to a falling out between the two composers.

Beginning in the late 1990s, Stockhausen revised a number of his earlier aleatoric scores, making versions in which the details were worked out and fixed in conventional notation. The last of these was Mixtur, reworked in 2003. In several moments of the original version, the players choose what they play from a selection of written material. Mixtur 2003 eliminates such indeterminacy by completely writing out all the parts. The overall form is also fixed in the new version, which eliminates the movability of some moments permitted in the two previous versions. Many earlier performances had presented two different versions, usually the backwards version first, followed by the forwards version. The score of Mixtur 2003 is written out twice, first in the forwards and then in the backwards version. In a programme note Stockhausen characterised this back-and-forth motion as a metaphor for the interplay between life and death. The world premiere of the new version took place at the Salzburg Festival on 30 August 2006. Stockhausen was to have conducted (and had led the rehearsals in Berlin the previous June), but was forced to cancel because of an attack of sciatica, and his place was taken by Wolfgang Lischke. The performers were the Deutsche Symphonie-Orchester Berlin, with electronics by the Experimentalstudio für akustische Kunst Freiburg, supervised by André Richard.

== Material and form ==
Mixtur is an example of moment form, made up of twenty formal units called "moments", each of which is "recognizable by a personal and unmistakable character". It possesses at the same time a "polyvalent form", in which the components may be performed in different sequences, and incorporates elements of aleatory (called "variable form" by Stockhausen).

The orchestra is divided into five groups, each of a particular timbre: Holz (woodwinds), Blech (brass), Schlagzeug (percussion), Pizzicato (plucked strings), and Streicher (bowed strings). The sounds from each group except the percussion are picked up by microphones and ring modulated with sine tones, producing transformations of the natural timbres, microtonal pitch inflections, and—when the sine tone frequencies fall below about 16 Hz—rhythmic transformations as well. In some moments, such as "Ruhe" and "Blech", the ring modulation serves mainly a coloristic purpose, while a moment like "Translation" plays on foreseen effects in such a way that the electronics become an essential structural component. In other moments, the sine-tone frequencies are directly connected to the larger-scale structure. In "Spiegel", for example, the sine tones focus on the upper octave of the central tone, F♯. In "Tutti" and "Stufen", on the other hand, the sine tones change with each prominent note in the orchestra in such a way that the output difference or summation tones remain constant on the central tone of that moment.

The division of the orchestra into five groups is decisive for the overall form of the composition. Each moment is given a name describing its overall character, a "central tone" (in a few cases, two consecutive central tones), a tone to be omitted (sometimes two tones), an overall duration, a proportion of silence, a "density" (number of orchestra groups participating), and a timbral mixture:

Moments in Mixtur
	name	central tone(s)	omitted tone(s)	duration	rest (proportion)	density	timbres
1	Mixtur [mixture]	C_{7}	F♯	12	0	4	H/B/P/S
2	Schlagzeug [percussion]	—	—	30	1/5	1	Sch
3	Blöcke [blocks]	B_{5}	F	78	1/2	3	H/P/S
4	Richtung [direction]	C♯_{6}	G	48	1/3	2	Sch/P
5	Wechsel [exchange]	A♯_{6}	E	18	1/8	4	H/B/P/S
6	Ruhe [quiet]	D_{5}	G♯	78	0	2	B/S
7	Vertikal [vertical]	A_{4}	D♯	12	1/8	3	Sch/P/S
8	Streicher [bowed strings]	D♯_{4}	A	18	1/5	1	S
9	Punkte [points]	G♯_{5}–E_{3}	D–A♯	30	1/3	3	H/B/S
10	Holz [woodwinds]	G_{3}–F_{2}	C♯–B	48	1/2	1	H
11	Spiegel [mirror]	F♯_{4}	C	48	0	4	H/B/P/S
12	Translation	F_{2}–G_{3}	F♯–F	30	1/2	2	H/P
13	Tutti	E_{3}–G♯_{5}	G–E	78	1/8	5	Sch/ H/B/P/S
14	Blech [brass]	D♯_{4}	G♯	12	1/5	1	B
15	Kammerton [A=440]	A_{4}	D♯	18	1/3	3	H/P/S
16	Stufen [steps]	A♯_{6}	D	30	0	4	H/B/P/S
17	Dialog [dialogue]	D_{5}	A	18	1/2	2	Sch/B
18	Schichten [layers]	C♯_{6}	A♯	48	1/8	3	B/P/S
19	Pizzicato	B_{5}	C♯	78	1/5	1	P
20	Hohes C [high C]	C_{7}	B	12	1/3	2	H/S

The duration unit is to be determined by the conductor, from between 40 and 60 beats per minute according to the score instructions for the kleine Beasetzung (the original, large-orchestra score specifies 50 to 60 beats per minute, but by 1971 Stockhausen favoured the slower tempo of 40). The numbers of units per moment are taken from five steps of a scale proportioned according to the Fibonacci series: 2, 3, 5, 8, and 13, with each value multiplied by 6: 12, 18, 30, 48, and 78. The usefulness of this series lies in the roughly constant proportion between successive members—the deviations of which diminish as the series is extended.

The twenty moments can be played in numerical order, ascending or descending. The former is referred to as the "forwards version", the latter as the "backwards version". The sequence of events within each moment, however, is the same in either version. Certain moments may also be exchanged: no. 1 with 5, 11 with 16, and 15 with either 3 or 20. Moments 14 and 15 may be played simultaneously in place of no. 5, in which case the brass parts from no. 5 replace 14 and the remainder takes 15's place. When the order is reversed or exchanges made, some details in neighbouring moments are altered. For example, the central tone of moment 11 ("Spiegel"), the F♯ above middle C, is to be continued through whichever moment follows it, and this may be nos. 12, 10, 17, 15, 5, 3, or 20, depending on the chosen permutation of moments and the direction of the version.

== Discography ==
- Stockhausen, Karlheinz. Telemusik, Mixtur (version for small orchestra, Nr. 16 1/2, "erster Frankfurter Version 1967") Ensemble Hudba Dneska, Ladislav Kupkovič (cond.); Johannes G. Fritsch, Harald Bojé, Rolf Gehlhaar, David Johnson (sine-wave generators); Karlheinz Stockhausen (sound direction). Avant Garde. LP recording. Deutsche Grammophon 137 012. Hamburg: Deutsche Grammophon, 1969.
- Stockhausen, Karlheinz. Mixtur: Kleine Besetzung (1967)—Rückwärts- und Vorwärts-Version. Orchester Hudba Dneska, [Ladislav Kupkovič (cond.); Johannes Fritsch, Rolf Gehlhaar, David Johnson, Harald Bojé (sine-wave generators); Karlheinz Stockhausen (sound projection). Recorded by WDR, 23 August 1967, in Frankfurt. CD recording. Stockhausen Complete Edition CD 8. Kürten: Stockhausen-Verlag, 1993.
- Musica Viva Festival 2008. Stockhausen, Mixtur 2003, Symphonieorchester des Bayerischen Rundfunks, Lukas Vis (cond.); Experimentalstudio des SWR, André Richard (sound director). With works by Karl Amadeus Hartmann, Aribert Reimann, Jörg Widmann, Matthias Pintscher, Iannis Xenakis, James Dillon, Beat Furrer, Giacinto Scelsi, Chaya Czernowin, Kaija Saariaho, Liza Lim, Rebecca Saunders, Adriana Hölszky, and traditional music from Egypt and Iran. Fundación BBVA, Kooperation mit BR Klassik. 6-disc hybrid multichannel SACD set. NEOS 10926. [Munich]: NEOS Music GmbH, 2009.
- Stockhausen, Karlheinz. Mixtur 2003 für Orchester. Deutsches Symphonie-Orchester Berlin, Wolfgang Lischke (conductor); Karlheinz Stockhausen (rehearsals); Joachim Haas, Thomas Hummel, Bryan Wolf, and Reinhold Braig (sound mixers); Sven Thomas Kiebler, Antonio Pérez Abellán, Sven Kestel, and Holger Busse (sine-wave generators); Experimentalstudio des SWR, André Richard (sound director). Recorded at the Lehrbauhof, Salzburg, 30 August 2006. CD recording, 1 disc: digital, 12cm, stereo. Stockhausen Complete Edition CD 106. Kürten: Stockhausen-Verlag, 2015.
