= Momente =

Musical work by Karlheinz Stockhausen

- Cantata by Karlheinz Stockhausen
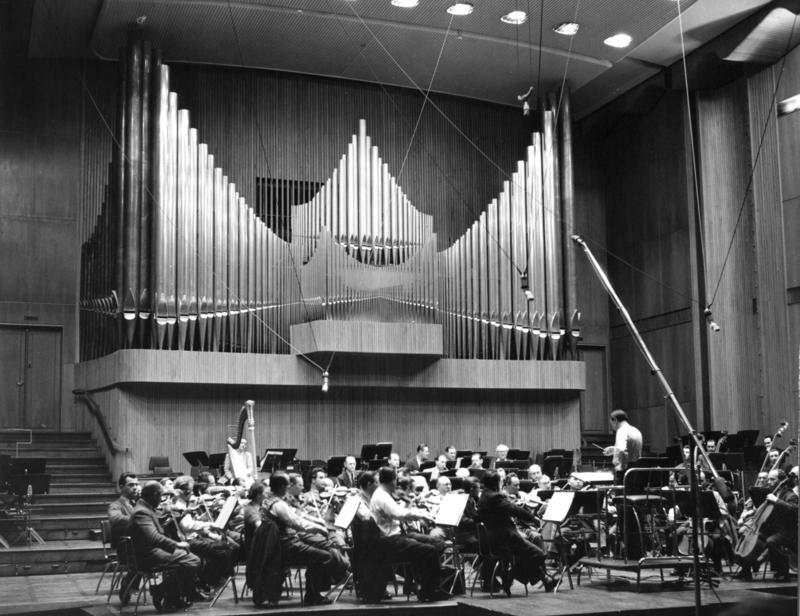
- Großer Sendesaal of the WDR in 1954, where the first version was premiered
- English: Moments
- Text: various text fragments
- Language: German
- Performed: 21 May 1962
- Scoring: soprano; four mixed choirs; thirteen instrumentalists

Momente (Moments) is a work by the German composer Karlheinz Stockhausen, written between 1962 and 1969, scored for solo soprano, four mixed choirs, and thirteen instrumentalists (four trumpets, four trombones, three percussionists, and two electric keyboards). A "cantata with radiophonic and theatrical overtones", it is described by the composer as "practically an opera of Mother Earth surrounded by her chicks". It was Stockhausen's first piece composed on principles of modular transposability, and his first musical form to be determined from categories of sensation or perception rather than by numerical units of musical terminology, which marks a significant change in the composer's musical approach from the abstract forms of the 1950s.

== History ==
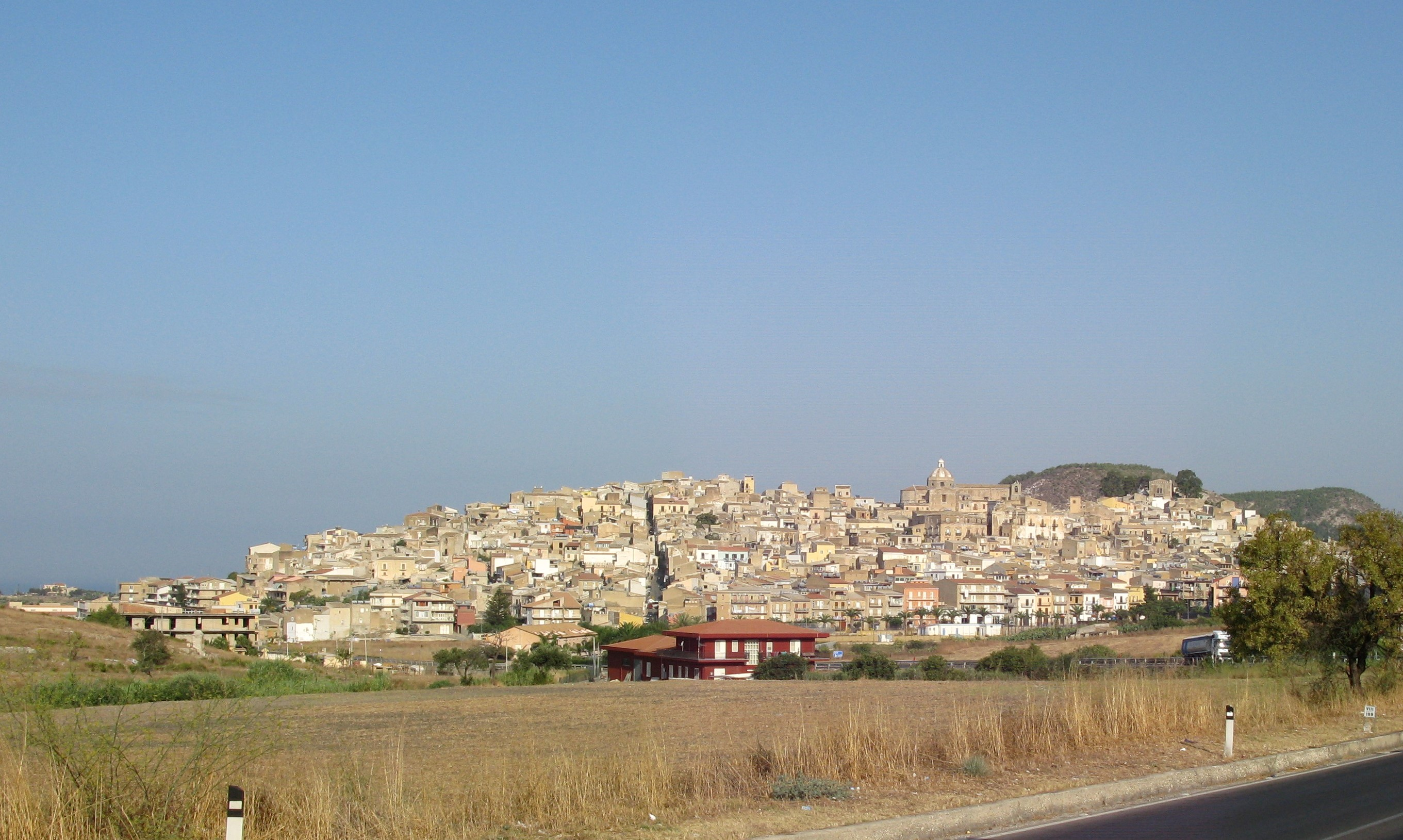
Siculiana, in Sicily, where the first version of Momente was begun

Stockhausen began work on Momente in January 1962, with a performance planned for the following May. He had been invited by Baron Francesco Agnello to withdraw for the period of composition of the work to his palazzo in Siculiana on the south coast of Sicily. Agnello was an ardent supporter of modern music, and directed the Settimane Internazionali di Nuova Musica di Palermo. The plan was that Stockhausen would go to Sicily first, and Mary Bauermeister would follow a week later, to work on paintings for an exhibition planned for Amsterdam in June. Stockhausen's wife Doris would join them in March, leaving their children in someone's care in Cologne. The palazzo was freezing cold, as it was really intended only as a summer residence, and for three months both Stockhausen and Bauermeister "worked like crazy" on their respective projects, retreating to a small, easily heated room, furnished with a piano and two tables.

Shortly before Doris was to have come to Siculiana a telegram arrived, saying she had been taken seriously ill and required surgery. Stockhausen decided to return to Germany to support her, and they spent a quiet time in the Black Forest, where Doris went to recuperate.

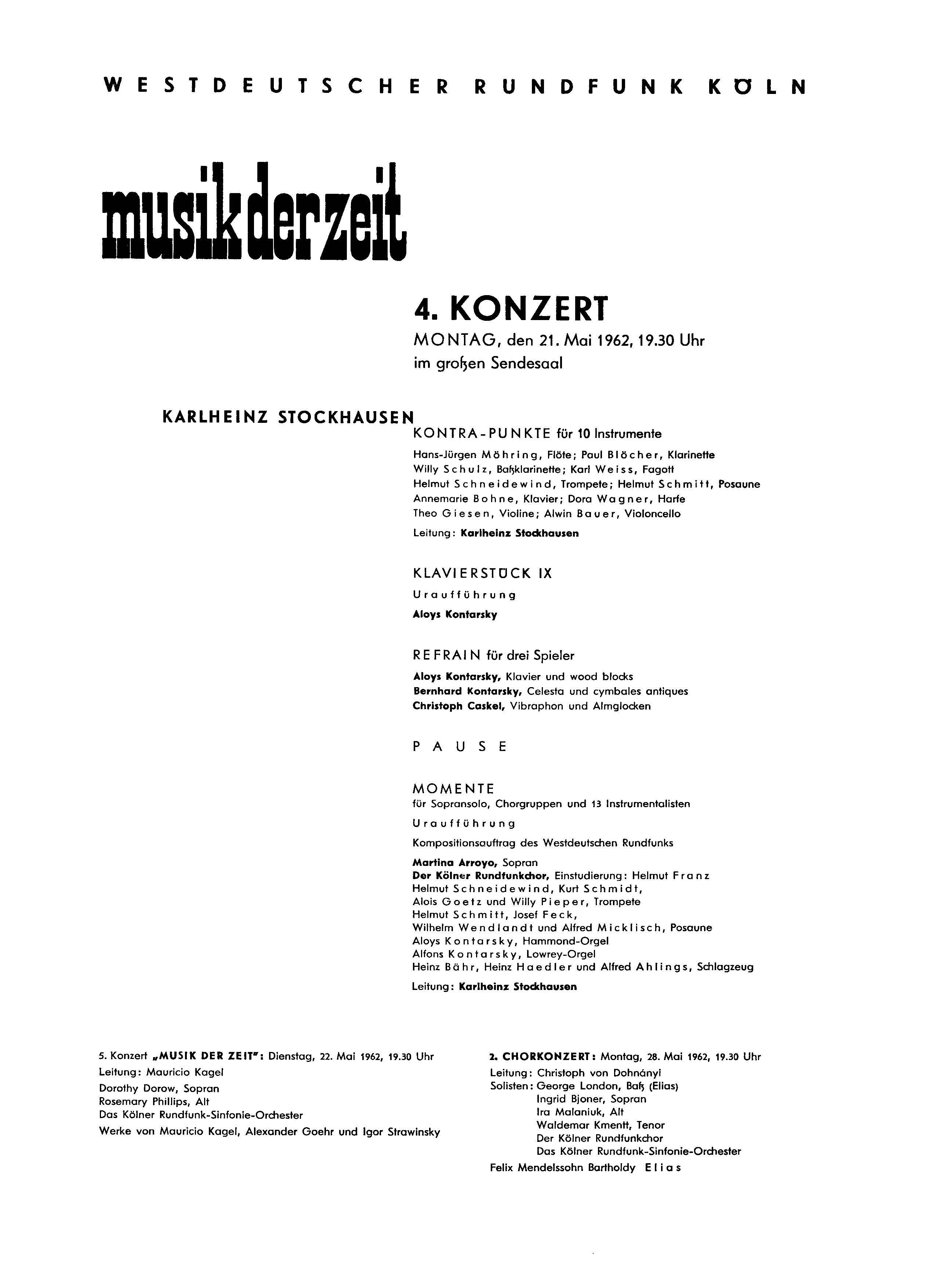
Programme for the world premiere of Momente (first version), on 21 May 1962

A first version of Momente, consisting of all the K moments, i(m), i(d), M(m) and MK(d), was premiered on 21 May 1962 at the Westdeutscher Rundfunk (WDR) in Cologne with Martina Arroyo as soloist. Moment i had already been composed, but was not included in the Cologne performance. A second group of moments, including all the remaining M moments and some of the D moments, was composed for a performance planned for the 1963 Settimane Internazionali di Nuova Musica di Palermo, but the musicians rebelled at the unconventional nature of the music and the performance did not take place. Early in 1964 these moments were revised. Seven of the M moments and the i moment were added for a tour in October 1965, but the D moments were withheld for practical performance reasons.

Some of the D moments were subsequently reworked, and the long i(k) moment composed for a completely new version, completed in 1969 but only premiered on 8 December 1972 in Bonn. This version was recorded for commercial release and taken on a tour of Europe.

== Texts ==
Stockhausen draws on a variety of sources for the texts of Momente:

- Primarily in the D moments, the Song of Songs, in the translation by Martin Luther. Many of the M Moments use shorter extracts from this source.
- Extracts from a letter from Mary Bauermeister, mainly in moment I(k), where they are used with passages from the Song of Songs.
- Brief quotations from The Sexual Life of Savages by Bronisław Malinowski, an anthropological report of the Trobriand Islands in British New Guinea, found, for example, in moment M(d).
- A quotation from William Blake: "He who kisses the joy as it flies/Lives in Eternity's sunrise", found in moment M(d) and, in the 1972 and 1998 versions, as an insert from M(d) in M.
- Names from fairy tales, e.g., Rapunzel (MK); invented names, e.g., Kama, Maka, Dodi; cries and exclamations heard from audiences at performances of Stockhausen's earlier works, e.g., "bravo", "pfui", "nein, das ist unmöglich", "da capo", "stop it!", "furchtlos weiter", "sortez", "bald?", "so?", "schon?", "jetzt?", "ja!", "nein", "awful!", "doch!", "immer", "wann?", "warum?", "wie?", "wo?", "sure?", "wozu?".
- Invented onomatopoeic words, and phonetic texts written by Stockhausen himself.

The main compositional problem was to mediate among all these text fragments, in order to avoid the effect of mere collage.

== Timbres ==
Momente seeks to employ the greatest possible number of vocal phenomena—not just conventional singing but also the communication functions of spoken and whispered language, crying, and laughter, producing an "infinitely rich mode of expression ... [that] profoundly touches our emotive sensibility". Isolated syllables and even single phonemes or linguistic segments, including vowels, continuant consonants, and tongue clicks are used "in a scale extending from unvoiced exhaling via aspiration, whispering, giggling, murmuring, speaking, shouting, screaming and laughing, to singing" in order to "permit the composition of timbral transitions and relations between spoken and instrumental sounds".

In addition to singing, the choir members clap their hands, snap their fingers, stamp and shuffle their feet, and slap their thighs. They also play small "auxiliary" instruments: choir I has cardboard tubes of various lengths with glued-on covers, played like drums using light mallets; choir II uses twelve pairs of claves—all with different pitches; choir III shakes plastic soap boxes and refrigerator drink canisters filled with buckshot, which sound like maracas with different pitches, according to the number of pellets and the size of the plastic canisters or boxes; choir IV uses twelve pairs of Volkswagen lug-nut spanners (which kept disappearing during rehearsals, because most of the choristers drove Volkswagens). The purpose of these instruments was to create mediating links between the percussion and vocal timbres. Having the choristers play simultaneously with each syllable they sing or speak automatically and easily solves the problem of rhythmic coordination. However, Stockhausen reported that the WDR choir, which sang for the première, initially objected to these practices and, "because such means of sound and noise production can have a comic effect, . . . one newspaper report talked about a 'cabaret performance' and ridiculed the whole thing".

== Form ==
Momente exemplifies what Stockhausen calls moment form, in which the listener's attention is on the "now", on the "eternity that does not begin at the end of time but is attainable in every moment". At the same time, it constitutes a "polyvalent form", in that its 30 sections (also called "moments") can be arranged in many different sequences.

There are three main groups of moments, designated by letters: eight M, seven K, and eleven D moments. The letters stand for Melodie (melody), Klang (sound, or chord), and Dauer (duration), and also have an autobiographical significance, with K for "Karlheinz" and the other two letters for Stockhausen's first and second wives, "Doris" and "Mary".

The M group emphasizes

- monophony/heterophony
- "random" rhythms
- mixed pitches and noises
- scoring mainly for the brass and solo soprano
- an average medium dynamic level

The K moments concentrate on

- vertical, homophonic textures
- periodic rhythms
- a predominance of noises
- a scoring mainly for the men's voices and percussion
- a generally loud dynamic

The D moments have

- a "diagonal", or polyphonic character
- syncopated rhythms
- pitches but little noise
- scoring primarily for the electric organs and women's voices
- an average soft dynamic.

The K group always stands at the centre, with either the D moments preceding and the M moments following (as in the 1972 and 1998 performing versions), or the reverse. Each moment group includes one "pure" type, designated with the simple letter, and a number of "mixed" types containing "influences" from the other types, designated with multiple letters. These occur on four hierarchical levels, the first being the level of the three pure moments. In the second level, only a slight degree of influence from one other type occurs (about 30%), and is indicated with lowercase, bracketed letters, e.g., M(k) and M(d) in the M group. On the third level, there is a nearly equal balance between two types, and the letters are capitals, such as MK and MD in the M group; each of these is partnered by a neighbouring moment that adds a slighter influence from the third type, e.g., MK(d) and MD(k). The fourth level is found only in the D group, and includes DKM, the only moment in which all three types are balanced, as well as three partially "self-reflexive" moments, D(d–m), DK(d), and DK(k). The M group also adds one entirely self-reflective moment, but on the third level: moment M(m). A basic duration is assigned to each moment according to its level. The pure M, K, and D moments are each to last two minutes; the second-level moments each last one minute; the third- and fourth-level ones thirty and fifteen seconds, respectively.

However, in many cases these basic durations are extended in actual performance, in part because of inserted material, and in part because many of the moments can or must be repeated. Sometimes the repetition of a moment involves a considerable change of speed. For example, DK(d) has a basic duration of fifteen seconds, but upon repetition is performed four times slower. Consequently, its actual duration is five times longer, at a minute and a quarter.

With the exception of M(m), each moment at a lower hierarchical level is attached to a pair of moments on the next higher level, and the members of that higher pair may be exchanged, in order to prepare a version for a particular performance. In addition to this mobile condition of the moments, the internal elements ("partial moments") of six of the eight M moments (M(k), M(d), MD, MK, MD(k), and the central M moment itself) are also rearrangeable.

To these three main groupings of moments are added four I ("informal", or "indeterminate") moments, which are used to frame and separate the three main sections:

I(d) always stands between the M and K groups, I(k) always between the K and D groups. ... The I(m) moment is independent and can stand at the beginning, or before or after I(k); according to its position it will be read either forwards or backwards. Moment I always stands at the end.

The I moments are the longest moments in the work, and serve to neutralize the others. As originally planned, I (the final, "praying" moment) was to last eight minutes, and I(k), I(d), and I(m) four minutes each. This would have meant their combined duration of twenty minutes would have been equal to that of the other twenty-six moments combined. However, in the compositional working-out, the durations of I and I(m) were increased to about ten and five minutes, respectively, and I(k) was even more drastically expanded, to more than twenty minutes—as long as all the other I moments put together.

== Inserts ==
Once the order of the moments has been determined, "inserts" are made from some moments into the immediately preceding or following moment, according to a complex set of rules. These inserts may take on some of the characteristics of the host moment. In the D group, for example, most of the inserts must be transposed to match the central tone of the host moment.

== Reception ==
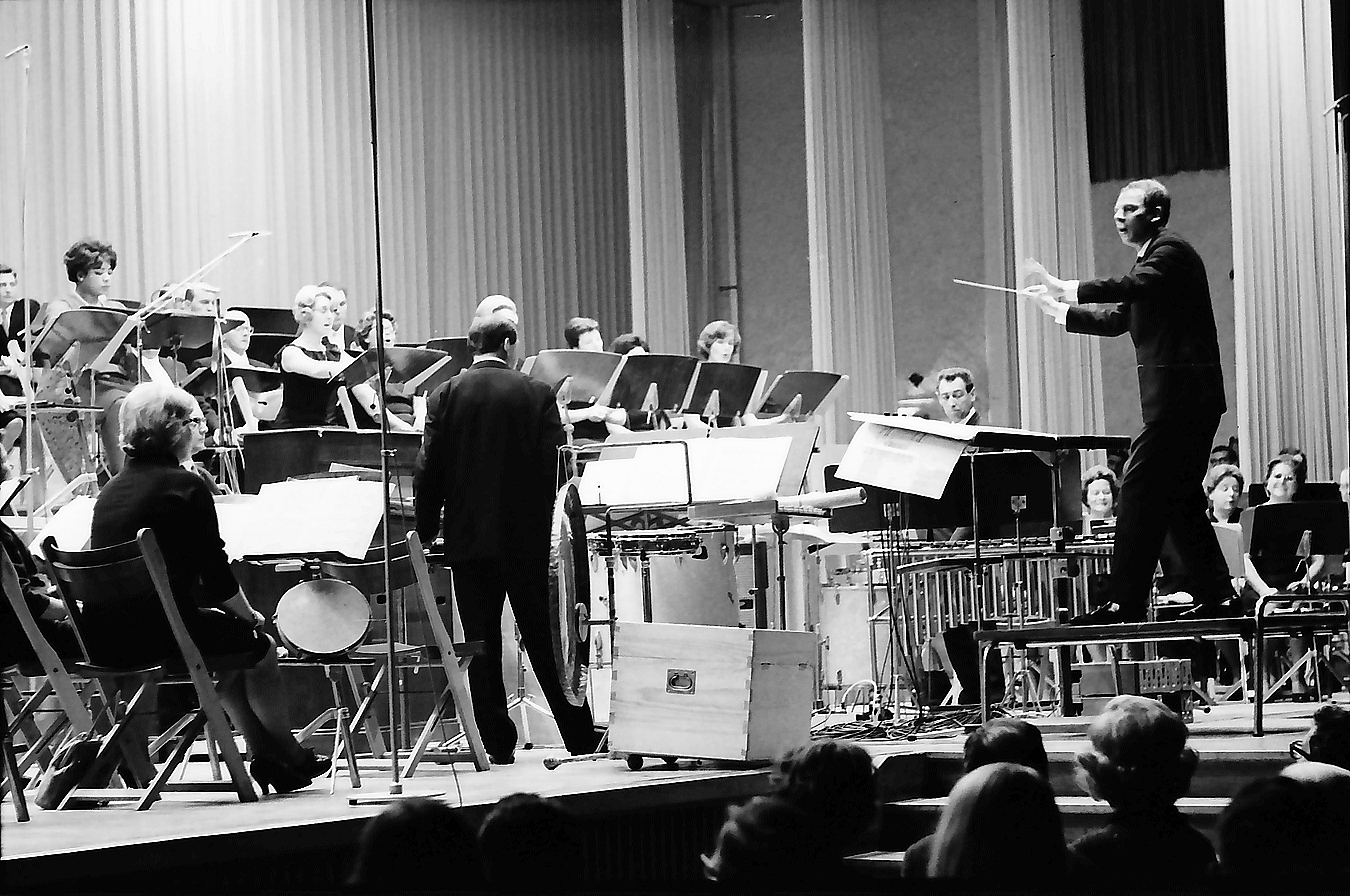
Stockhausen conducting Momente at the Donaueschingen Festival 1965 (with Martina Arroyo as the soloist (larger view, even larger view)

Momente caused a sensation at the first (partial) performance in Cologne on 21 May 1962, in part because the moment used to begin that version, the so-called "clapping moment" I(m), begins with applause in the choirs. This was seen by some as a mockery of the audience, but by others as a means of intensifying the connection between audience and performers.) Besides the opening I(m) moment, this first version consisted of just two of the M and all of the K moments, separated by the I(d) "organ moment".

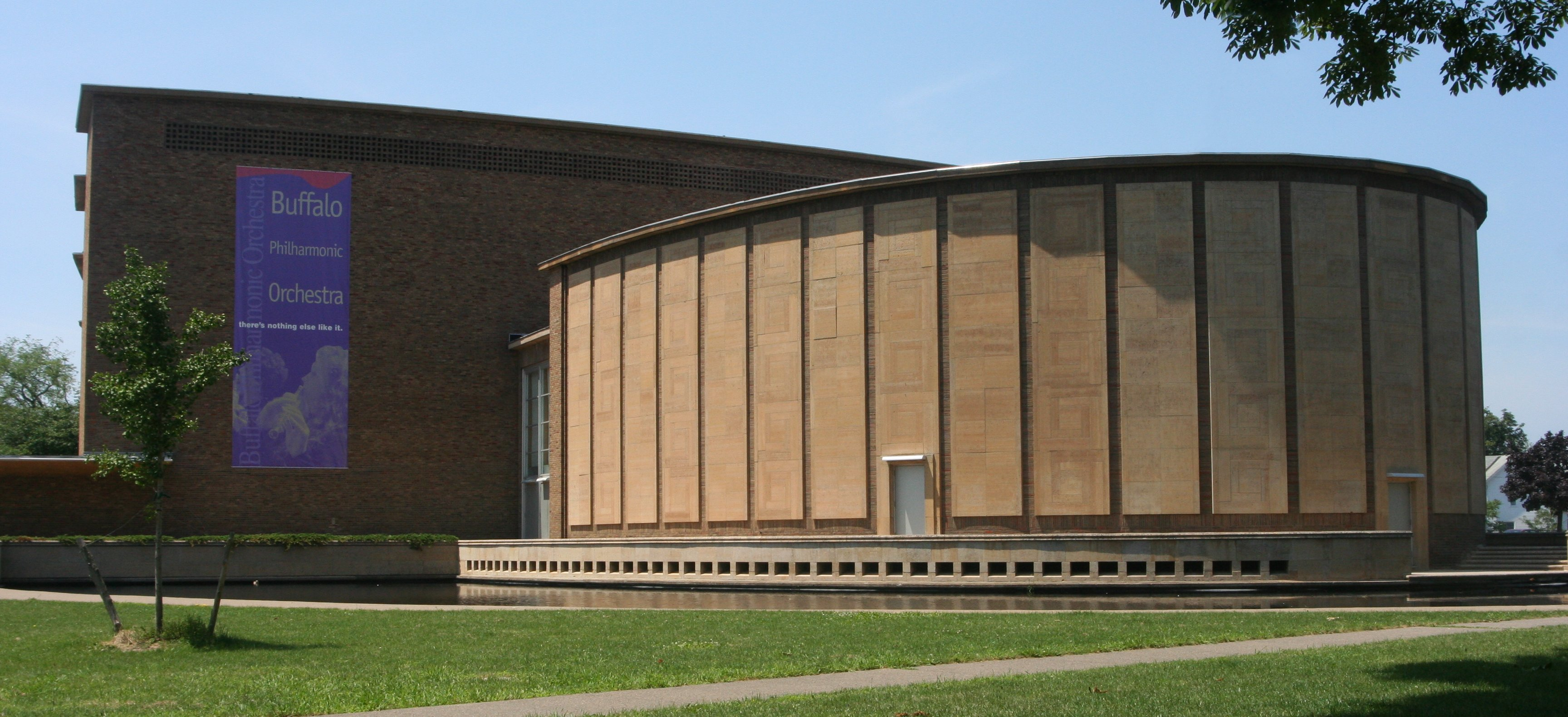
Kleinhans Music Hall in Buffalo, New York, venue for the North American premiere of Momente on 1 March 1964

This version was also heard in the first American performance, at Kleinhans Music Hall in Buffalo, New York, on 1 March 1964. At the Donaueschingen Festival in October 1965, an expanded version was given, which added the remaining M moments and the I(i) "praying" moment, which is meant to conclude all versions. This version, with additions composed in the summer of 1963 and early 1964, was perceived as more good-humoured and less confrontational than the first version. A recording of this version was released on the WERGO and Nonesuch labels. Completion of the D moments was only accomplished in 1969, and the first complete performance took place in Bonn on 8 December 1972, in a version beginning with the newly composed, 25-minute-long I(k) moment, which is very different from the previously composed moments and which some critics at the time felt was out of proportion to and out of character with the rest. Rudolph Frisius simply regards the original "applause" moment beginning as being characteristic of the "informal" music in the spirit of the early sixties, whereas the new beginning of the 1972 version looks forward, in its evocative ritual gestures, to Stockhausen's works of the seventies. Although it seemed to some at the time that the "long and exhilaratingly dramatic section" of I(k) "could never be anything but an opening", the version prepared under the composer's direction in 1998, begins with the original I(m) "applause" moment, and I(k) opens the second part, after the intermission.

== Discography ==
- Stockhausen, K[arlheinz]. Momente, für Sopran. 4 Chorgruppen und 13 Instrumentalisten, Version 1965. Martina Arroyo, soprano; Aloys Kontarsky, Hammond organ; Aloys Kontarsky, Lowrey organ; chorus and members of the orchestra of Radio Cologne (WDR); Herbert Schernus, choir master; Karlheinz Stockhausen, cond. Studio-Reihe neuer Musik. WERGO WER 60024 (LP). Mainz: Wergo Schallplatten, [n.d.]. Reissued Nonesuch H-1157 (mono LP), H-71157 (stereo LP). New York & London: Nonesuch Records, [n.d.]. Reissued on CD, WERGO WER 6774 2.
- Stockhausen, Karlheinz. Momente, "Europa Version 1972". Gloria Davy, soprano; WDR Rundfunkchor Köln (Herbert Schernus and Karlheinz Stockhausen, choir rehearsals, assisted by Péter Eötvös and Godfried Ritter); Instrumentalists of the Ensemble Musique Vivante (Diego Masson, dir.); Roger Smalley, Hammond organ; Harald Bojé, Lowrey organ; Karlheinz Stockhausen, cond. With excerpt from the 1965 version (I (m), M, and I moments), from WERGO 60024. Deutsche Grammophon DG 2709055 (3-LP set). Reissued on CD, Stockhausen Complete Edition 7 (2 CDs with 4-colour 78pp text booklet and separate booklet with complete sung texts). Kürten: Stockhausen-Verlag, 1992.
- Stockhausen, Karlheinz. Momente [1998 version]. Angela Tunstall, soprano; WDR Rundfunkchor Köln (choir soloists: Maria Ungers, Hein Heidbüchel, Josef Otten, Kai Freundorfer, Ursula Kunz); MusikFabrik; Antonio Pérez Abellán and Massimiliano Viel, synthesizers; Rupert Huber, cond.; Karlheinz Stockhausen, sound projection. Stockhausen Complete Edition 80 (2 CDs). Kürten: Stockhausen-Verlag, 2006.
- Stockhausen, Karlheinz. Momente 1963/1972: Lesung und 2 Interviews. Includes moment I(k) from the DGG recording with Gloria Davy. Kürten: Stockhausen-Verlag, 2008. Text-CD 19.

== Filmography ==
- [Lawrence, Robert (prod.)]. 1964. Karlheinz Stockhausen: Momente. Martina Arroyo, soprano; Crane Collegiate Singers of SUNY Potsdam (Brock McElheran, chorus master); members of the Buffalo Philharmonic Orchestra; Karlheinz Stockhausen, cond. Recorded in Kleinhans Music Hall, Buffalo, New York, on 1 March 1964. Performance preceded by a discussion between Karlheinz Stockhausen, an anonymous interviewer, and the Buffalo Philharmonic's music director, Lukas Foss. Produced by NET in co-operation with WGBH (Boston), WNED (Buffalo), and Robert Lawrence Productions (Toronto).
- Lohner, Henning. 1988. Stockhausen—Lichtwerke: Musik von heute, Klang von morgen. [N.p.]: onVision Film & Musik Produktionen GmbH, 1988.
- Maconie, Robin. 1980. Omnibus: "Tuning in with Stockhausen and Singcircle". London: British Broadcasting Corporation. (BBC1 Colour).
- Patris, S. Gérard (dir.), and Luc Ferrari (prod.). 1965. Karlheinz Stockhausen: Momente, Version 1965, Cologne. Martina Arroyo, soprano solo; orchestre et chœurs: West Deutcher [sic] Rundfunk; chef des chœurs: Herbert Schernus; orgues: Aloïs [sic] et Alfons Kontarsky. [Karlheinz Stockhausen, cond.]. Les Grandes Répétitions (series). [Paris]: Pierre Schaeffer et le Groupe de Recherche Musicale du Service de la Recherche de l'ORTF. INA/WDR [distrib.] 4456-1.
- Slotover, Robert (prod.). 1974. Karlheinz Stockhausen, Moment-Forming and Integration: "Momente" for Solo Soprano, Chorus and Thirteen Instrumentalists. Filmed at the Institute of Contemporary Arts, London, 13 February 1972. London: Allied Artists.
