= Musik für ein Haus =

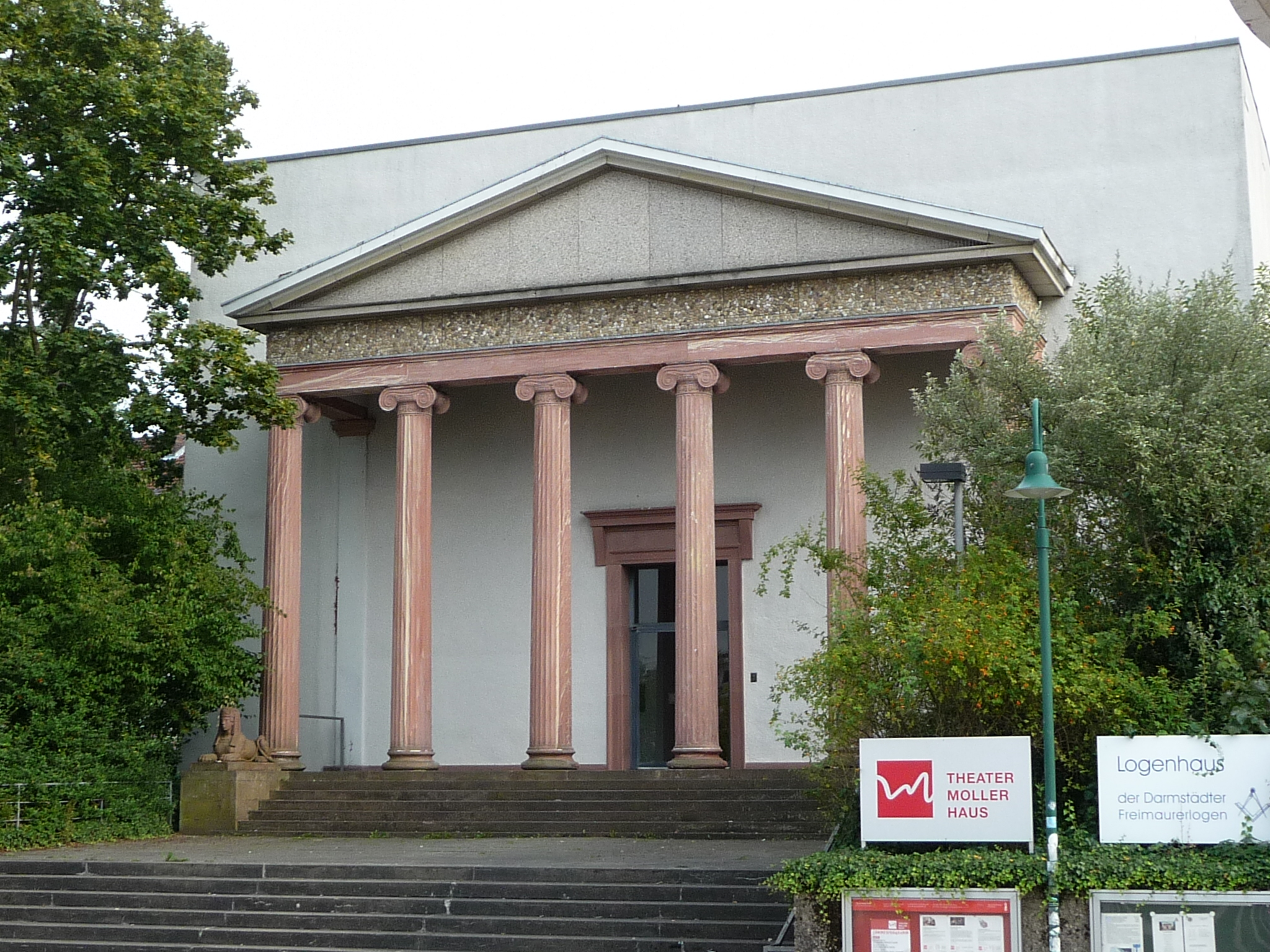
Moller-Haus, Darmstadt

Musik für ein Haus is a group-composition project devised by Karlheinz Stockhausen for the 1968 Darmstädter Ferienkurse. Fourteen composers and twelve instrumentalists participated, with the resulting performance lasting four hours. It was not regarded by Stockhausen as a composition belonging solely to himself, and therefore was not assigned a number in his catalog of works.

== History ==
Since the late 1950s Stockhausen had been considering a piece to be called Kammermusik (Chamber Music), which would have involved the construction on a stage of a number of chambers (like a multiple stage set), in each of which musicians could be isolated from the others with the sounds of their performances being combined from outside. At the same time, there would be opportunities for individual musicians to move from one chamber to another, in order to produce constantly changing configurations. Stockhausen never realised this idea, but for the 1968 Darmstädter Ferienkurse Stockhausen organised a composition seminar as a successor to the previous year's Ensemble.

Between the original planning, which began as early as November 1967, and the start of the courses in August 1968, Stockhausen experienced a personal crisis that changed the shape of the project. Following the premiere of Kurzwellen in Bremen on 5 May 1968, Stockhausen received a letter from his second wife, Mary Bauermeister, informing him that she would not be returning from America and declaring that their marriage was at an end. The resulting depressive episode prompted Stockhausen to a hunger strike, during which he read Satprem's book on Sri Aurobindo. The result was a new form of composition for Stockhausen, the fifteen texts of Aus den sieben Tagen. He called this intuitive music, and resolved to use these verbally described processes as the basis of the Darmstadt composition studio, which lasted for the seventeen days preceding the Ferienkurse. As part of his efforts to sharpen the participants' awareness for this new kind of composing, Stockhausen scheduled some seminar sessions late at night or early in the morning, which included listening to recordings of Japanese Gagaku and temple music, as well as field trips to services at a Jewish synagogue in Frankfurt and a Russian Orthodox church, and a specially arranged Catholic mass at a Capuchin monastery.

Stockhausen initially selected twelve composers from a larger number of applicants. Several guest participants were also admitted, and of these two additional composers, Clare Franco (USA) and Jens-Peter Ostendorf (Germany) contributed to the final product. The fourteen participating composers and their works were:

Composer	Compositions
David Ahern (Australia)	Unglaubliche Floridas, for flute, oboe, bass clarinet, bassoon, electronium, violin, cello
Junsang Bahk (South Korea)	Assimilation, for oboe, cello, and organ
Gregory Biss (USA)	Du and Hin, for bass clarinet, horn (or bassoon) and electronium
Boudewijn Buckinx (Belgium)	Atoom, for flute, oboe, bass clarinet, bassoon, and cello
Clare Franco (USA)	Einwärts and Paul Klee, for cello and piano
Rolf Gehlhaar (USA)	Wendekreis, for violin and electronium
Fred van der Kooy (Netherlands)	Spielweg, for oboe, bassoon, horn, and trombone
Mesías Maiguashca (Ecuador)	Hör-Zu and Verwandlung, for 12 instruments
John McGuire (USA)	Auflösung, for horn, trumpet, and piano
Costin Miereanu (Romania)	Zeitfarben, for flute, horn, trumpet, trombone, cello, and double bass
Jens-Peter Ostendorf (Germany)	Kommunikation, for solo viola
Jorge Peixinho (Portugal)	Lichtkreis, for flute, oboe, bass clarinet, bassoon, horn, trumpet, trombone, and double bass
Thomas Wells (USA)	Montezuma's Revenge, Vector Music, and Nexus, for flute, bass clarinet, trumpet, double bass, and tape
Jaroslav J. Wolf (Czechoslovakia)	Transzendenz, for trombone and double bass

Twelve instrumentalists had also been invited:

- Eberhard Blum (flute)
- Heinz Holliger (oboe)
- Josef Horák (bass clarinet)
- János Mészáros (bassoon)
- Georges Barboteu (horn)
- Pierre Thibaud (trumpet)
- Vinko Globokar (trombone)
- Harald Bojé (electronium)
- Aloys Kontarsky (keyboard instruments)
- Saschko Gawriloff (violin)
- Othello Liesmann (cello)
- Georg Nothdorf (contrabass)

They were joined by Johannes Fritsch (viola), and David C. Johnson (alto flute and electronics).

Stockhausen began by introducing the participants to the fifteen newly composed text compositions of his cycle Aus den sieben Tagen, and informed them that this mode of composition was what he wanted them to use themselves for the project. They did not all take him seriously at first, nor understand clearly his intentions. Outside of the seminar, during meal breaks and other personal conversations the participating composers came up with a number of light-hearted parodies of Stockhausen's texts. Jaroslav Wolf was the undisputed master of this genre, taking Stockhausen's Unbegrentzt (Unlimited): "Play a sound with the certainty that you have an infinite amount of time and space" and turning it into: "Do in and with the hall what you want with the certainty that the composer has enough money to cover all breakages." Gehlhaar countered with, "Play with the certainty that you'll receive your fee in any case".

In the course of discussion and critique of submitted texts, three important criteria were formulated"

- Economy and precision of verbal formulation of a musical process
- Guarantee the musical quality
- Compulsory eruption of the process from the confines of traditional thinking habits

Although the serious texts ultimately developed for the project adopt some of the traits of Stockhausen's texts (in particular, addressing the performers with the second-person-familiar Du) they differed in significant and understandable ways from the proposed models. Many of them reflected the knowledge that there would be interaction with other pieces, but they are also longer and more "practical" than most of the texts of Aus den sieben Tagen. Stockhausen himself developed five new text pieces during the seminars, which would later become part of a second collection of text pieces, Für kommende Zeiten (For Times to Come).

Musik für ein Haus was premiered on 1 September 1968 in the Moller-Haus, the masonic lodge in Darmstadt, in a performance that ran continuously from 6:00 to 10:00pm.

After the experience of Ensemble and Musik für ein Haus, Stockhausen continued the idea of simultaneous performances in different spaces with a project for the Beethovenhalle in Bonn, including a mammoth composition Fresco for four orchestral groups, with unhappy results. He also planned a sequel composition-studio project for the 1970 Darmstadt courses, which was to have been performed outdoors in the woods surrounding Schloss Kranichstein. It was provisionally titled Musik im Wald (Music in the Woods), but in the end Stockhausen abandoned the idea in favour of a series of retrospective analytical lectures.

== Analysis ==
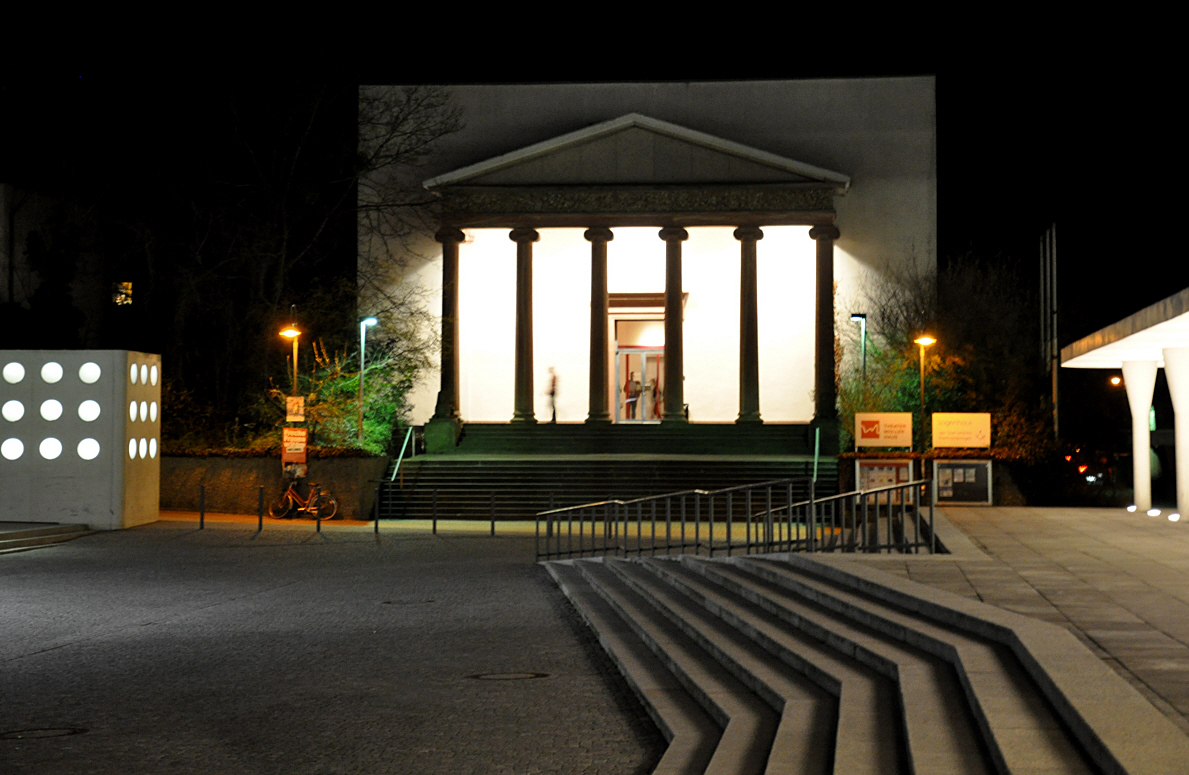
Moller-Haus, Darmstadt, at night

The shape of the whole was formed around the spaces in which it was performed, and the technical arrangement for the amplification of sound and the linking of microphones and speakers between the various rooms employed. While the Moller-Haus predetermined the shape of the spaces, the technical setup was designed by Stockhausen together with Ludwig Klapproth, the technical director of the Ferienkurse.

The simultaneous performances in different rooms on three different floors of the Moller-Haus were synchronized by Stockhausen as different layers of a polyphonic composition. The audience could pass from one layer to another by moving from room to room, but the combined effect could only be heard over loudspeakers in the basement control room, where none of the performers were.

Towards the end a tape recording of the previous day was played back over the speakers in the room. Since tapes had been used repeatedly anyway and the musicians left and returned to their room, sometimes a room was empty for a while. Then the audience went into the next room and found the musicians again. Around midnight it happened that, as prearranged, the musicians gradually all left the house. Finally, there was nobody left. The audience noticed this, but only over the course of about half an hour, after which it became common knowledge that no performers were any longer in the house. The music continued to sound for quite some time, hardly changed. What in fact was sounding is what we had played the day before and recorded, and now was started up on several tape recorders. When the audience finally left the house, we were already 30 kilometers further away at a restaurant. Some people were still in the house and, as we were told, said to one another: "Oh, heck, they got clean away" [Auditorium laughs.]
