= Ensemble (Stockhausen) =

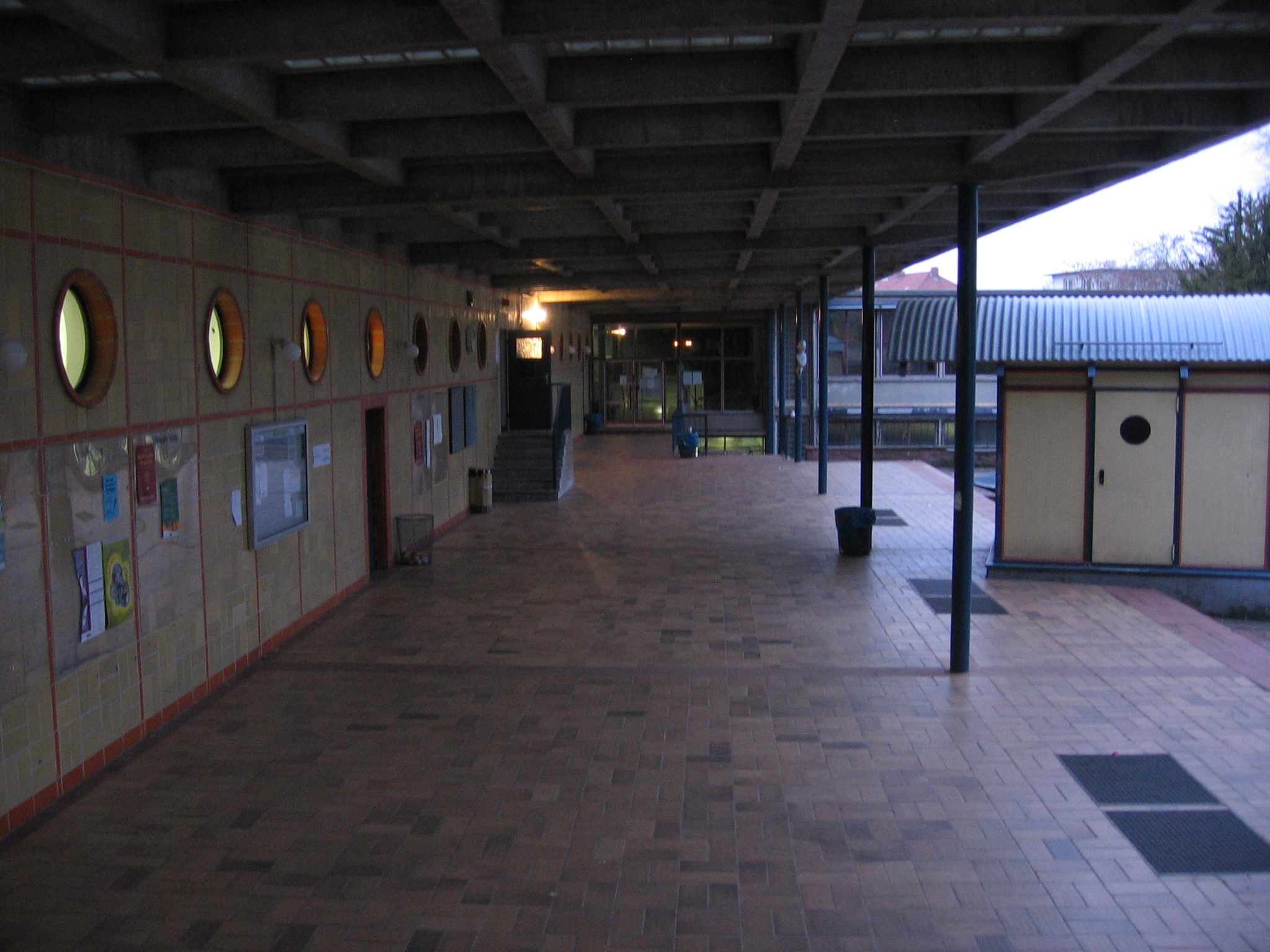
Ludwig-Georgs-Gymnasium, inner-courtyard entrance to the Turnhalle

Ensemble is a group-composition project devised by Karlheinz Stockhausen for the 1967 Darmstädter Ferienkurse. Twelve composers and twelve instrumentalists participated, and the resulting performance lasted four hours. It is not assigned a work number in Stockhausen's catalogue of works.

== History ==
For the 1967 Darmstädter Ferienkurse Stockhausen organised a composition seminar during the two-week period preceding the courses proper, in which twelve composers from various countries each developed a composition which was a dialogue to be performed by an instrumentalist and the composer, using either a previously prepared tape of sound materials or a short-wave receiver. This was the first time in the history of the Darmstadt Courses that actual composing was formally undertaken within the framework of the courses themselves.

The participating composers were paired with the instrumentalists (eleven members of the Ensemble Hudba Dneska (Bratislava), directed by Ladislav Kupkovič, plus Aloys Kontarsky:

	Composer	Instrumentalist
flute	Tomás Marco (Spain)	Ladislav Šoka
oboe	Avo Sõmer (USA)	Milan Ježo
clarinet	Nicolaus A. Huber (Germany)	Juraj Bureš
bassoon	Róbert Wittinger (Hungary)	Jan Martanovič
horn	John McGuire (USA)	Jozef Ṧvenk
trumpet	Peter R. Farmer (USA)	Vladimir Jurča
trombone	Gregory Biss (USA)	František Hudeček
violin	Jürgen Beuerle (Germany)	Villiam Farkaš
cello	Mesías Maiguashca (Ecuador)	František Tannenberger
double bass	Jorge Peixinho (Portugal)	Karil Illek
percussion	Rolf Gehlhaar (USA)	František Rek
Hammond organ	Johannes Fritsch (Germany)	Aloys Kontarsky

They were supplemented at the mixing consoles by:

- Harald Bojé
- Alden Jenks
- David C. Johnson
- Petr Kotik

A public dress rehearsal of the resulting collective composition was held on 28 August, and the official performance took place on 29 August 1967 in the Turnhalle (gymnasium) of the Ludwig-Georgs-Gymnasium (Ludwig Georg High School) in Darmstadt, and was a sufficient success to guarantee that a similar course would be held the following year. This second project would be titled Musik für ein Haus.

== Analysis ==
The twelve constituent composer/performer duos are scattered throughout the hall, and are coordinated according to a "process plan" composed by Stockhausen, who also composed eight inserts leading to occasional points of synchronisation. Each group is picked up on microphones and fed to four mixing consoles, controlled by additional musicians whose task is to expand certain details of sound and send them wandering around the hall over eight loudspeakers. The audience members are also free to move about the hall and choose their own acoustical perspectives.

The music was therefore pluralistic, soloistic, and collective all at the same time. The inserts composed by Stockhausen were intended to unify all of the performers by verticalizing the musical events, harmonically and rhythmically. The performance was arranged to begin before the audience began to arrive, and ended with each composer-instrumentalist pair leaving the gymnasium one after another, still playing in the back of cars as they drove away, to meet again at 2:00am twenty miles away.

== Discography ==
- Karlheinz Stockhausen: Ensemble. Music of 12 performing composers, members of the Ensemble Hudba Dneska, and Aloys Kontarsky, Hammond organ. Recording of the dress rehearsal, rehearsal and performance, 28 and 29 August 1967, each four hours in duration, edited and reduced to about 62 minutes by Mesías Maiguashca at the Studio für elektronische Musik im WDR, 26 August – 22 September 1971. LP recording, 1 disc: 12 in., 33 1/3 rpm, stereo. Studio-Reihe neuer Musik. Wergo WER 60065 Mainz: Wergo 1971.
