= Oeldorf Group =

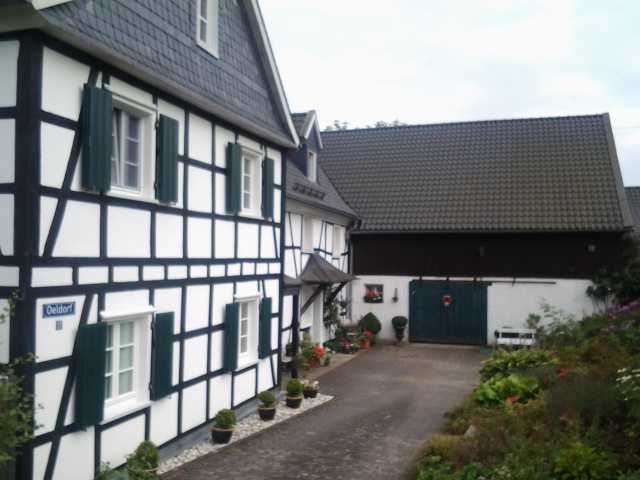
The farmhouse and barn in Oeldorf

The Oeldorf Group was a musicians' collective active in Germany in the 1970s. Based in the village of Oeldorf, near Cologne, their performances emphasized live-electronic music.

== History ==
The Oeldorf Group was founded in 1972 or 1973 and remained active until about 1978 or 1979. Live-electronic music was a particular emphasis, though they also performed all kinds of new and avant-garde music, as well as traditional repertory.) In fact, contrast of old and new music was an essential feature of the Oeldorf Group's concerts.

The group took its name from the village of Oeldorf (a part of the municipality of Kürten, 40 kilometers east of Cologne and seven kilometers from the central village of Kürten), where they lived and worked in a rented farmhouse. They had their own studio for electronic music and studio productions, and in the barn adjacent to the house they were able to present concerts for audiences up to about 300 people, although they also performed in various other places. They also published their own music. The core members were Peter Eötvös (at that time best known as a composer) who performed electronics and keyboards, his wife, the pianist Pi-hsien Chen, the violinist/violist and composer Joachim Krist, electronics specialist and composer Mesías Maiguashca, who also played keyboards, and Maiguashca's wife, the cellist Gaby Schumacher. They were closely associated with the Cologne-based Feedback Studio, consisting of David C. Johnson, Johannes Fritsch, and Rolf Gehlhaar.

Through their long-standing contact with the Westdeutscher Rundfunk (WDR), the Oeldorf Group was able to receive commissions for compositions, invitations to perform in the Musik der Zeit concert series, as well as having many of their summer concerts recorded for the late-night broadcasts of WDR3. One example was Oeldorf 8 by Mesías Maiguashca, a two-year retrospective portrait of the Oeldorf Group commissioned by the WDR. It consists of a series of eight short pieces for four instrumentalists (clarinet, violin, cello, electric organ/synthesizer) and tape, which may be played either simultaneously or continuously without a break. The score is dedicated to Maiguashca's three Oeldorf colleagues who, together with the composer, premiered the composition at the Darmstädter Ferienkurse in 1974.(

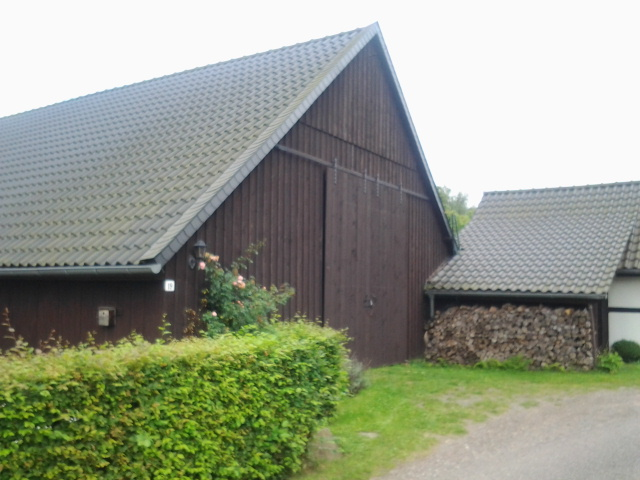
The barn in which the Oeldorf Summer-night Concerts were held

The Oeldorf Summer-night Concerts began as no more than private country musical soirées for a small circle of composers, but quickly grew to become a byword in the Cologne music scene. The 1973 summer season consisted of three concerts, the last of which took place on 23 June and consisted entirely of premieres of new compositions: David C. Johnson's Progranca—ein Oeldœuvre, Ulrich Stranz's Déja-vue, Silvio Fortić's Drei Lieder aus dem unvollendeten und unvollendbaren Zyklus 'la merde de siècle', and Emmanuel Nunes's The Blending Season.

In 1978 the group joined with the British Hydra Ensemble to inaugurate the newly built hall of the London Goethe Institute in a week of concerts and seminars organised by Rolf Gehlhaar.

== Characteristics ==
Live electronics were an important aspect of the Oeldorf performances, as illustrated by the Portuguese composer Emmanuel Nunes's 73-Oeldorf-75, for two electric organs and electronics, which was written for the group.

According to Maiguashca,

Stockhausen's group was different from both ours and Feedback because it was fully professional. His group was based at Westdeutsche Rundfunk and had the advantage of having "state of the art" professional equipment and setups.[ (Note: See Studio for Electronic Music (WDR))] No expense was spared. A Stockhausen concert involved sometimes truck loads of WDR equipment, and a brace of technicians. We were much more modest. Our equipment was semi-professional: we carried our own loudspeakers and did all the setups ourselves.

== Guest artists ==
In addition to the core members, guest artists also frequently appeared. In the 1973 summer series, Australian dancer Philippa Cullen (who had come to Germany to work with Karlheinz Stockhausen, who lived nearby) performed with a Theremin connected to a synthesizer, and the Slovenian violinist Miha Pogačnik played Bach's partitas for solo violin. Clarinetists Walter Seyfarth, David Smeyers, Suzanne Stephens, and Beate Zelinsky appeared at various times, and Stockhausen performed in his own composition Herbstmusik, which was written for the group in 1974. In 1976, the Hungarian violinist János Négyesy performed the violin sonatas by Charles Ives.
