= Litanei 97 =

- Choral music by Karlheinz Stockhausen
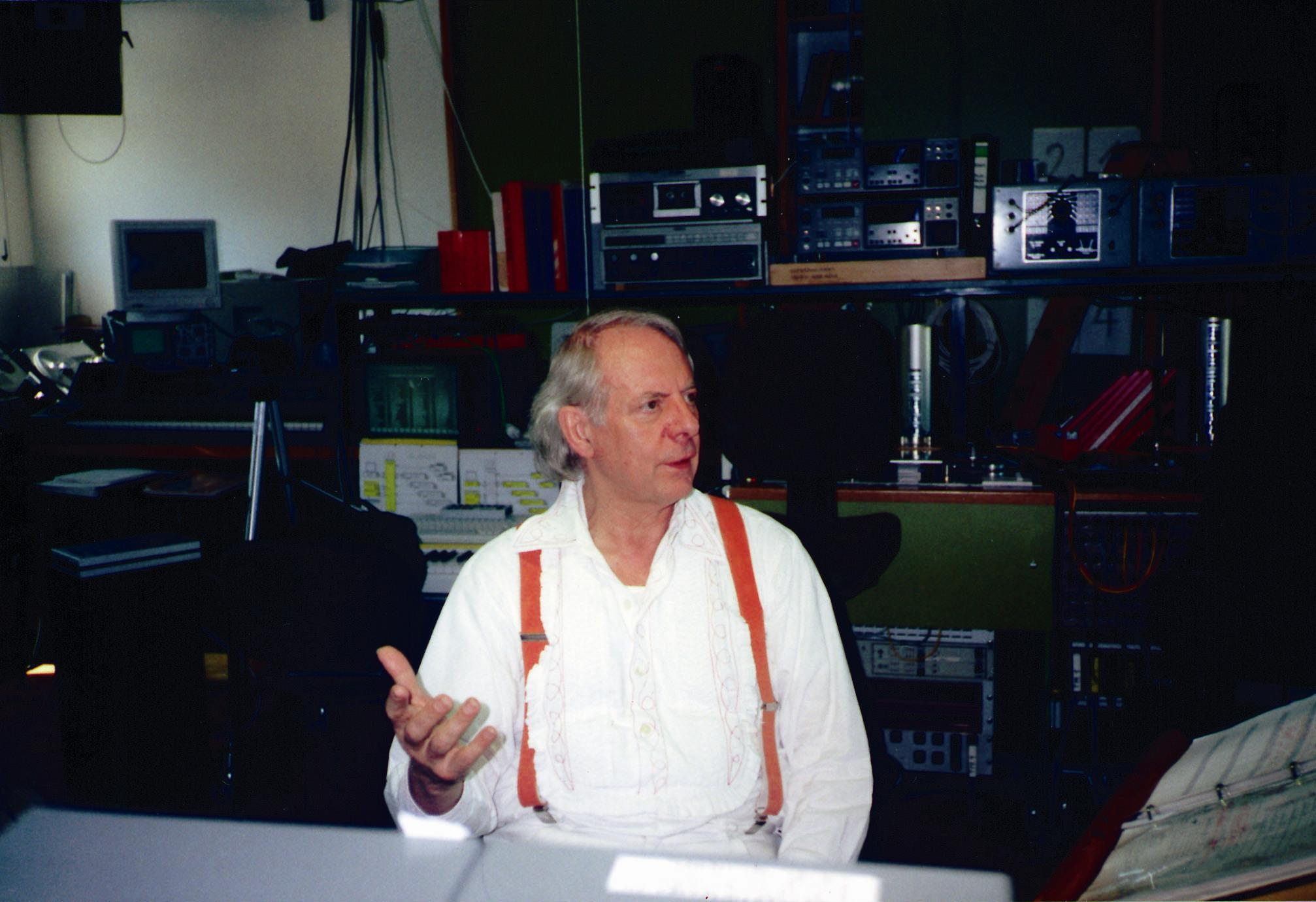
- Karlheinz Stockhausen in 1996
- English: Litany 97
- Catalogue: 74
- Text: by Stockhausen, from Aus den sieben Tagen
- Language: German
- Composed: 1997
- Performed: July 26, 1997
- Scoring: choir (often speaking); singing conductor; rin

Litanei 97 (Litany 97) is a choral composition by Karlheinz Stockhausen, written in 1997. Although the words are taken from the text-composition cycle Aus den sieben Tagen and the conductor sings and plays elements from the Michael formula used in the composer's Licht cycle of operas, it is an independent work assigned the number 74 in Stockhausen's catalogue of works. It lasts about twenty minutes in performance.

== History ==
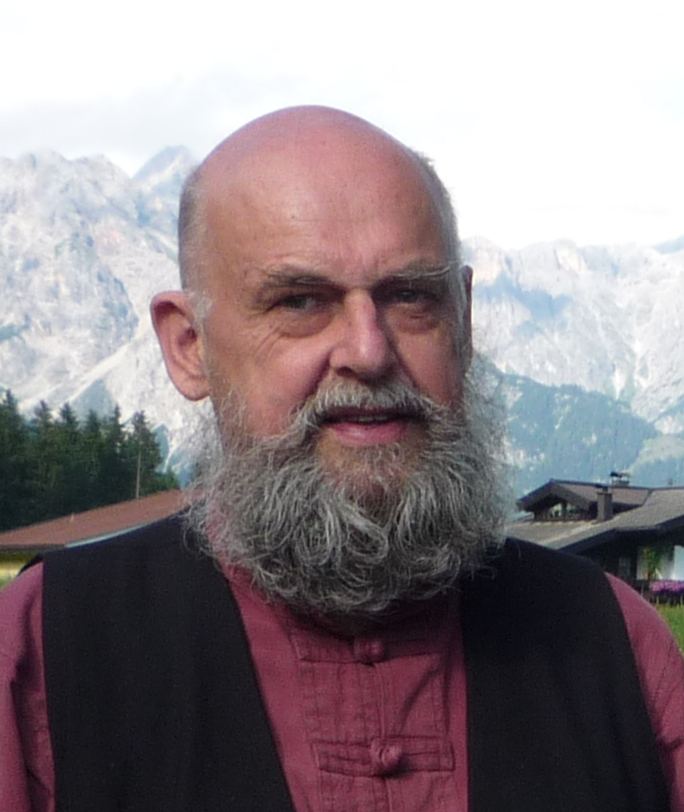
Rupert Huber, conductor of the world premiere

Litanei 97 was composed in 1997 for the Europäisches Musikfest für geistliche Musik, a European festival of sacred music organised by Ewald Liske and held in Schwäbisch Gmünd. The world premiere took place on 26 July 1997 in the Augustinuskirche, with Rupert Huber conducting the choir of the Südwestrundfunk (SWR)—the same performers who had premiered Stockhausen's Welt-Parliament the preceding year, and would premiere Michaelion in 1998. The first recording was made under the same conductor, but with a different choir, the SWR Vokalensemble, at the Villa Berg Studio of the SWR in Stuttgart from 28 to 30 June 2000, followed by two public performances at the Stuttgart Conservatory on the evening of 30 June.

It is the first of a small number of projects not directly related to the Licht cycle that Stockhausen undertook concurrently with work on the last two operas of the cycle, Mittwoch and Sonntag, and the only one of these that was not essentially a reworking of an earlier composition. This was a departure from work on the first five operas, when Stockhausen composed only material that would become part of the cycle.

== Analysis ==
The work sets the text Litanei from Stockhausen's 1968 cycle of text-compositions, Aus den sieben Tagen, for a speaking (only very occasionally singing) choir, together with a singing conductor (a tenor) who announces each of the five verses with a segment of the Michael formula from the opera cycle Licht. The fifth formula segment is divided into two parts, the second of which is delayed to the end of the final verse. The ends of the first four verses are marked with the concluding note (two notes, in the case of the first verse) of the respective formula segments, played by the conductor on Japanese bowl-gongs called rin. After the final verse, the conductor recapitulates all of the previous rin notes and adds the final pitch, D.

The text, written on 10 May 1968 and standing as the twelfth of the fifteen texts in Aus den sieben Tagen, groups its 44 lines into five stanzas of 8, 10, 7, 8, and 11 lines—a defective series missing the value 9 and with two occurrences of 8. For this new setting, Stockhausen bestowed a number of "quasi-serial" orderings on the successive stanzas to create five composite characters:

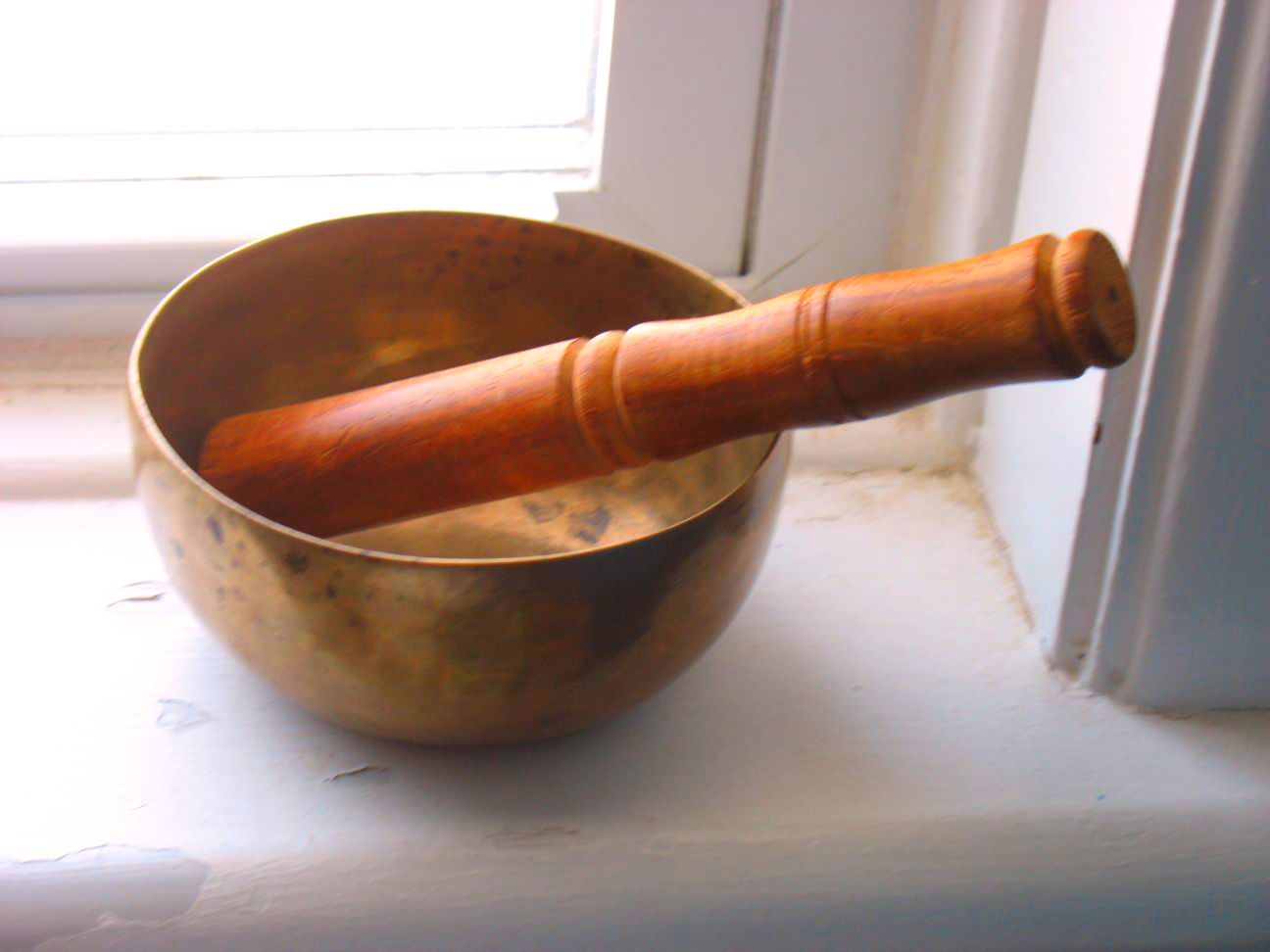
Japanese rin, of the type used to mark the ends of the five strophes of Litanei 97

- a distinctive register treatment (symmetrical in two groupings of the voices, each working within a bandwidth of at least a perfect fifth) in an overall crossing pattern (one group rising from low to high, the other group falling from high to low):
1. S+T low; A+B high (head voice)
2. S+T mid-low-mid; A+B mid-high-mid
3. S+T middle; A+B middle
4. S+T mid-high-mid; A+B mid-low-mid
5. S+T high; A+B low
- a distribution of the Michael-formula tones into groups of 3 + 2 + 4 + 1 + 3 (or 6, including recurring tones)
- types of pitch contours (Tonbewegungen):
1. sustained
2. rising tutti glissandos
3. falling tutti glissandos
4. rising-falling tutti glissandos
5. falling-rising tutti glissandos
- sound types (Tonformen), partly derived from the corresponding segments of the Michael formula:
1. trills
2. tremolos
3. "Morse" rhythms
4. yodels from above
5. yodels from below

Within each stanza serial distributions of sets are also used:

- rhythmic patterns are applied to the lines within each of the five stanzas, based on sets with 10, 11, 12, 13, and 9 elements, respectively
- "word glissandos", taken from a six-member set:
  - steady
  - rising
  - falling
  - combination of steady/rising
  - combination of rising and falling
  - combination of steady/falling

are used to mark the end of each line. Each member of the choir individually chooses any syllable from the preceding line and sings it on any pitch with a fast glissando. "This puts such a crowd of syllables in your ear that you can hardly understand a word, after which the next line—again perfectly intelligible—follows". This intelligibility of the text, declaimed by the choir in unison rhythms, means that—in contrast to so much contemporary music—the listener can hear immediately whenever a performer goes wrong.

== Performance practice ==
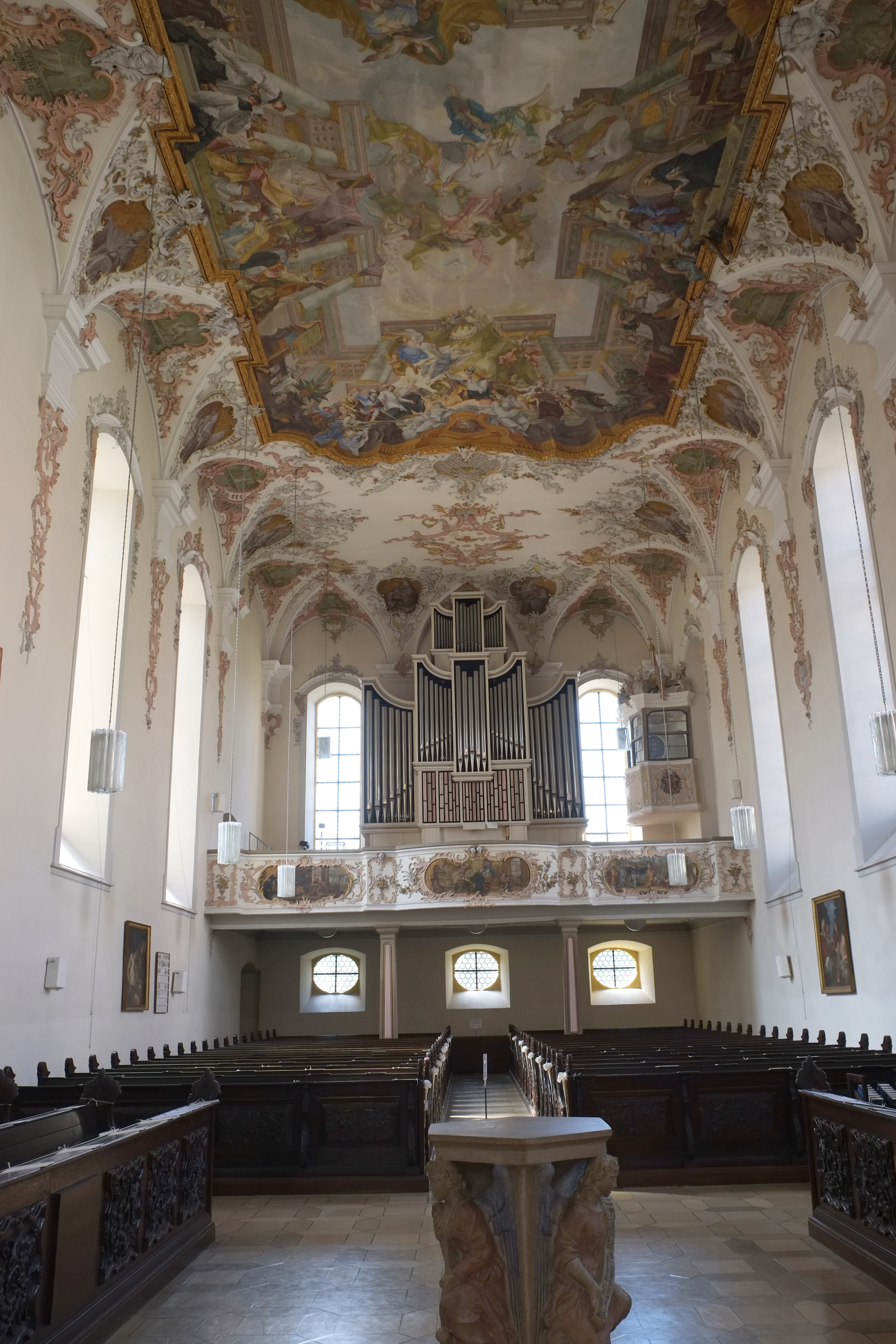
Augustinuskirche in Schwäbisch Gmünd, the space in which Litanei 97 was premiered

The score also specifies stage movement. The choir follow the conductor onto the stage at the beginning, forming an inward-facing circle around him. At the end of each line of text, the choir members synchronously take a step to the right throughout the first strophe. In strophes II to I, steps are sometimes taken in the opposite direction, and in strophe V, initially every other singer takes one step backward, thereby forming two concentric circles which rotate in opposite directions. Beginning at about the fourth line (depending on the size of the choir) at each bar one singer turns to face outward until, at line 11, all are facing outward, all the while continuing to rotate, the outer circle in a clockwise direction, the inner circle anticlockwise.

The score preface also suggests that the choir should be dressed uniformly, possibly in flowing blue robes such as were used for the world premiere. Despite the common perception that these are meant to resemble monks' habits, they were actually designed by the choir assistant at the South German Radio, based on a robe-like garment that Stockhausen had purchased while visiting Morocco.

== Reception ==
Press reviews of Litanei 97 have disagreed sharply on the merits of the work, but with little or no elaboration of their authors' often strongly emotional reactions, let alone any consideration of a larger context for the piece.

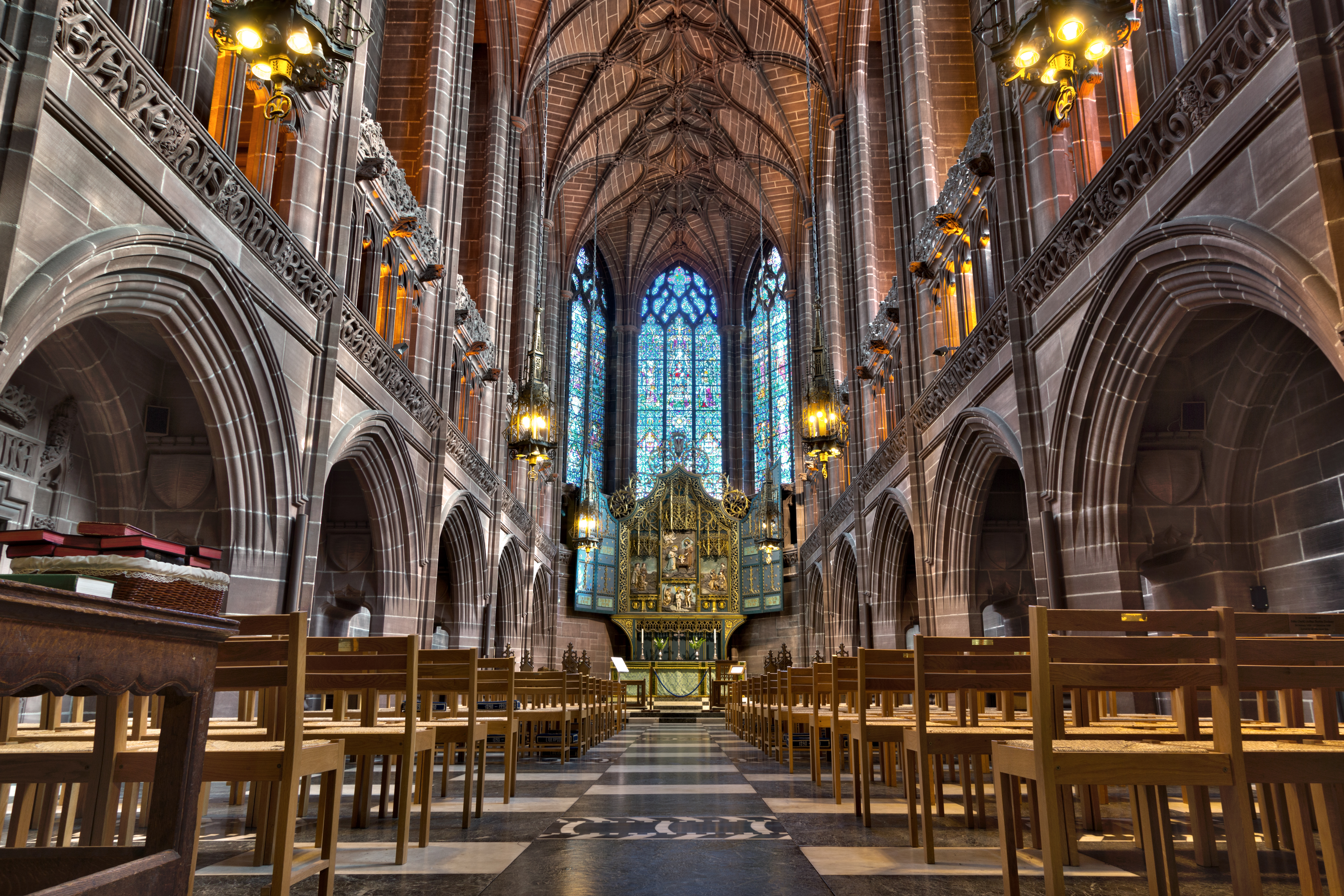
Liverpool Cathedral, site of the 2004 UK premiere of Litanei 97

The 2004 British premiere in Liverpool Cathedral was especially well received. Roderic Dunnett found the New London Chamber Choir's performance under James Wood to be "mesmerising" and concluded, "Elusive yet ingenious, although unhelped by some dotty stylised choir hopscotch, the work has an attractive transparency. The angular intervals on offer were superbly served by the cathedral's cavernous echo". The Daily Post reviewer observed that "stamping and dragging feet on the ground is all part of the music, along with total vocal expression: humming, hissing, whispering, wailing, vocal glissandi, staccato phrases, quiet contemplation.... The piece is atmospherically charged and sounded stunning in the huge acoustic".

An Amsterdam memorial concert in 2008, originally planned as a celebration of the composer's 80th birthday, included a performance of Litanei 97 by the Netherlands Chamber Choir. The work was dismissed by one American reviewer as an "a cappella work from the composer's late weirdo period", mentioning only that the choir "moved in concentric circles as they sang [sic], now and then adding silly choreographed hops". The reviewer for Het Parool wondered "where exactly things went wrong in Stockhausen's development. The piece contains very precisely noted declamation of a text that was written by the composer himself, in which he reveals the mystical source of his artistry, ... but unfortunately there was not much music in it". Roland de Beer on the contrary pronounced it "A jolly in memoriam" and enthused that: "Gout and housemaid's knee were gloriously absent with the Netherlands Chamber Choir who, in the a-cappella work Litanei (1997), sung in white monk's habits, not only hissed and hummed, but also went round in circles and hopped on their toes".

When the BBC Singers performed the work in 2009 (Stockhausen Immersion Day, London, Barbican Centre) Kevin Wheatley found the work "remarkable", but offered no further explanation, while Geoff Brown cracked: "Despite the BBC Singers' sophisticated splendour, Litanei 97 stayed more flatulent than eloquent, but no Stockhausen event seems complete without the composer at some point driving you up the wall."

German writers have given more serious consideration to the work's place in Stockhausen's œuvre, though they have mainly focussed on the composer's renewed interest in his 1968 text. A year after the world premiere of Litanei 97, music critic Heinz Josef Herbort, in a 70th-birthday tribute in Die Zeit, sought an explanation of Stockhausen's artistic credo. For Herbort, Stockhausen's inclusion of both old and new, illustrated by the juxtaposition of texts from Litanei 97 ("I do not make MY music, but / only relay the vibrations I receive;" and "Now comes the difficult leap: / no longer to transmit man-made signals, / music, tintinnabulation, / but rather vibrations which come / from a higher sphere, directly effective; / not higher above us, outside of us, / but higher IN US AND OUTSIDE") and from Vision, the closing scene of Donnerstag aus Licht from 1980 ("to bring celestial music to humans / and human music to the celestial beings, / so that Man may listen to GOD / and GOD may hear his children") invokes the conundrum of Goethe's famous Gretchenfrage.

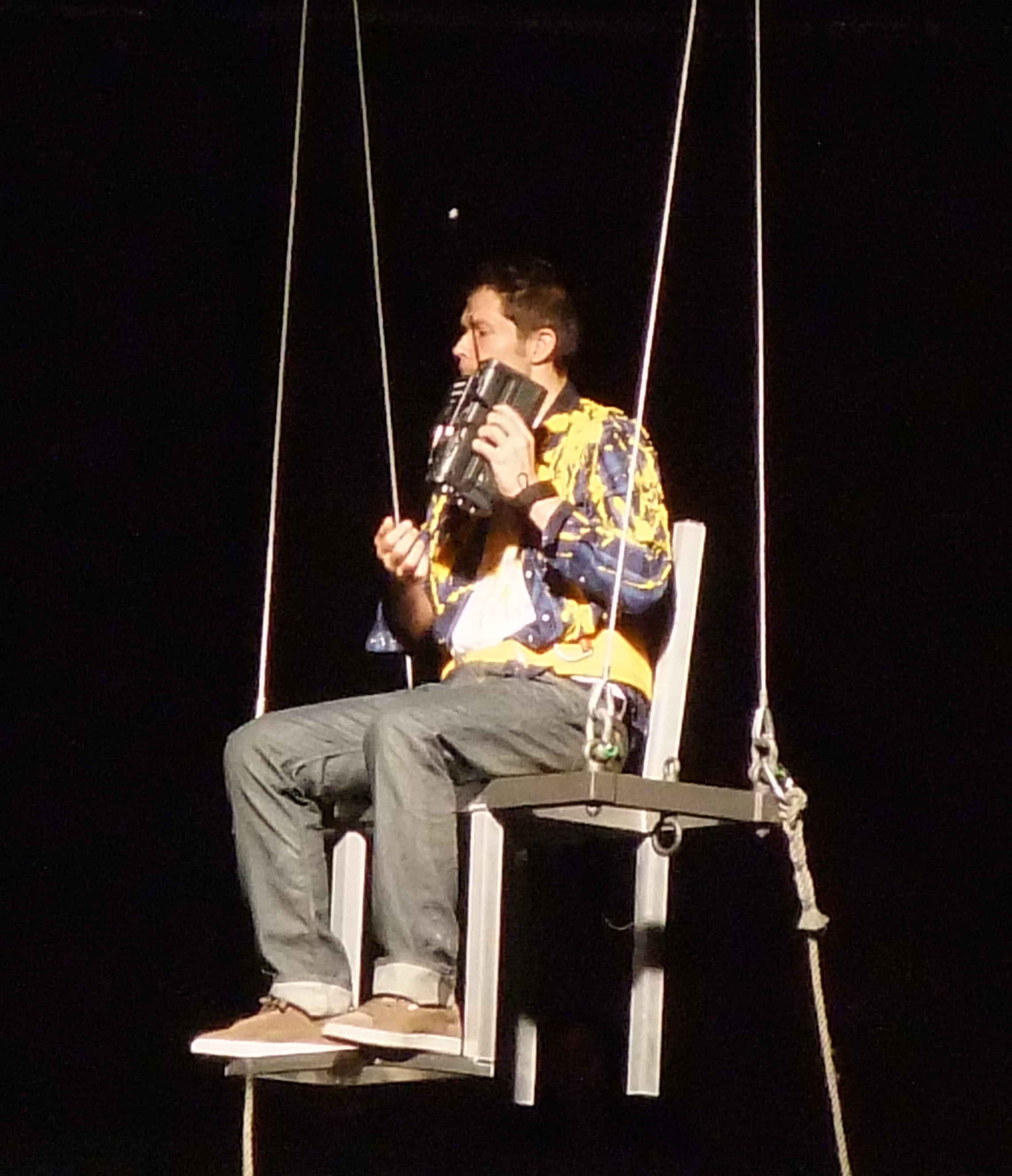
The Operator (Michael Leibundgut, bass) translates universal messages in Michaelion, Birmingham Opera, 23 August 2012

Dieter Gutknecht has gone a step further, comparing the attitude expressed in Stockhausen's text to that of medieval artists, for whom there could be no truly new act of creation, but only the discovery of something that already exists. But in the context of Stockhausen's situation in 1997, the "translator" mentioned in Litanei plainly becomes the Operator, Luca, in Michaelion whose task is to translate "universal messages" which "no human being can understand". Further, Gutknecht sees this mediator role as a reference to the miracle of Pentecost, described in Acts 2:4, where the capability, brought about by the Holy Spirit, of speaking "in strange tongues" means "that the speaker opens the power of the Spirit".

More recently, Rudolf Frisius has considered the music as well as the text, finding Litanei 97 to be a special case, "an ambivalent composition" involving a certain tension between older and newer modes of composition, which in turn feeds into Stockhausen's work on Mittwoch. In particular, the 1968 text explicitly mentions the then-just-completed work Kurzwellen, from which Stockhausen adopted the device in Michaelion (the final scene of Mittwoch, which also includes a setting of the entire text of Litanei) of having the Operator use a short-wave radio during the performance in order to obtain unforeseeable events to which he reacts in an improvisatory manner. In contrast to the "intuitive" music works, however, Stockhausen now seeks to integrate these "free" elements with fully notated tonal and rhythmic structures, which effects a transformation of the composer's working methods in Licht beginning in 1997. This same reconsideration of interpretive freedoms is found in several reworkings of older works which Stockhausen undertook shortly afterward, so that Litanei 97 is seen as a watershed work pointing to a new development not only in the closing phase of work on Licht, but in Stockhausen's last period of creativity generally.

== Discography ==
- Karlheinz Stockhausen: Litanei 97; Kurzwellen. SWR-Vokalensemble, Rupert Huber (cond.). Recorded 28–30 June 2000 at SWR Stuttgart. Harald Bojé, electronium; Alfred Alings & Rolf Gehlhaar, tamtam; Johannes Fritsch, viola; Aloys Kontarsky, piano; Karlheinz Stockhausen, sound projection and filters. CD recording, 1 disc: stereo, 12 cm. Stockhausen Complete Edition CD 61. Kürten: Stockhausen-Verlag, 2000.
