= Avo Sõmer =

Estonian-American musicologist (1934–2024)

- Born: June 27, 1934; Tartu, Estonia
- Died: May 30, 2024 (aged 89); Gwynedd, Pennsylvania, U.S.
- Education: Wayne State University (BS); University of Michigan (MA, PhD)
- Known for: analytical publications on early twentieth-century music

Academic background
- Thesis: The keyboard music of Johann Jakob Froberger (1963)

Avo Sõmer (June 27, 1934 – May 30, 2024) was an Estonian-born American musicologist, music theorist and composer of Estonian birth.

Sõmer was born in Estonia. He emigrated from Estonia with his parents in 1944, when he was ten years old, first to Germany and then to the United States. He had already begun playing the piano as a child in Pärnu. In Germany he took some piano lessons and instruction in theory, and began to compose, but systematic instruction in music came only later. He majored in music education, piano performance, and composition at Wayne State University in Detroit, Michigan, followed by graduate studies at the University of Michigan where, in 1957, he earned an M. A. with a thesis on Monteverdi's madrigals, and then, in 1963, a PhD with a dissertation "The Keyboard Music of Johann Jakob Froberger". In 1962 he joined the faculty of the University of Connecticut, where he remained until his retirement in 2000. Since that time he has increased his activity as a writer, and has spoken at conferences in Estonia on the music of Eduard Tubin, twentieth-century music in general, and the theories of Heinrich Schenker.

He is best known for his analytical publications on early twentieth-century music, especially that of Debussy and the Estonian symphonist, Eduard Tubin, though his unpublished Ph.D. dissertation remains a respected work among Froberger researchers.

As a composer, Sõmer participated in Karlheinz Stockhausen's composition studio at the Darmstädter Internationale Ferienkurse für Neue Musik in 1967, contributing the oboe part to Ensemble. He says this was a "significant moment" for him, but "mainly in a negative sense," because it made him realize he did not wish to continue with avant-garde music. Instead, he adopted a style close to that of the late works of Béla Bartók, with just a glimpse of the string quartets of Elliott Carter. Sõmer died on May 30, 2024, at the age of 89.

== Musicological and analytical works ==
- 1957. "The Madrigals of Monteverdi: A Study of Changing Styles and Forms." M. A. Thesis. Ann Arbor: University of Michigan.
- 1963. "The Keyboard Music of Johann Jakob Froberger." Ph.D. diss. Ann Arbor: University of Michigan.
- 1995. "Chromatic Third-Relations and Tonal Structure in the Songs of Debussy." Music Theory Spectrum 17, No. 2. (Autumn,): 215–41.
- 1999. "Imagery, digression, and coherence in Etude pour les agréments of Debussy." In A Composition as a Problem 2, edited by Mart Humal, 93–108. Tallinn: Eesti Muusikaakadeemia.
- 2000. "Süntaktilised kujundid Debussy sonaatides" [Syntactical structures in Debussy's sonatas]. In Töid muusikateooria alalt 1, edited by Mart Humal, 61–90. Tallinn: Scripta Musicalia.
- 2001. "'Leinalaulu teisenemised': Tonaalsed kujundid atonaalsel heliväljal Eduard Tubina Kaheksandas sümfoonias" ["Metamorphoses of Grief": Tonal Figures in an Atonal Field in the Symphony No. 8 of Tubin]. Rahvusvahelise Eduard Tubina Ühingu aastaraamat 1.
- 2003. "Orpheus ja Pierrot: 20. sajandi algusaastate uue muusika tahke" [Orpheus and Pierrot: Aspects of Early Twentieth-Century Music]. Akadeemia no. 3:565–86.
- 2003. "Lyricism and sentence formation in the earlier symphonies of Eduard Tubin." Rahvusvahelise Eduard Tubina Ühingu Aastaraamat/ Yearbook of the International Eduard Tubin Society 3, pp. 49–58. Tallinn: International Eduard Tubin Society.
- 2004. "Fantasque, ironique: An interpretation of the "Serenade" of Debussy's Cello Sonata." In A Composition as a Problem 4, no. 1, edited by Mart Humal. Tallinn: Eesti Muusikaakadeemia.
- 2004. "Muusika loomise ja analüüsi seostest" [Relationships between composing and analyzing the music] . In Mõeldes muusikast: Sissevaateid muusikateadusesse [Thoughts on music: Insights into musicology], edited by Jaan Ross and Kaire Maimets, 191–207. Tallinn: Varrak.
- 2005. "Musical Syntax in the Sonatas of Debussy: Phrase Structure and Formal Function". Music Theory Spectrum.27, no. 1 (Spring): 67–96. abstract
- 2006. "Interpreting Thematic Reprise and Transformation in Late Debussy." Paper presented at the Fifth International Conference on Music Theory, Estonian Academy of Music and Theatre, September 28–30.

== Compositions (selective list) ==
- Concertino, for flute, clarinet, bassoon, piano, percussion, violin, and cello (1964)
- Refrains: Light and air, for flute and clarinet (1966)
- Ensemble, oboe part in a collaborative composition, supervised by Karlheinz Stockhausen, for 12 instruments, tapes, and live electronics (1967)
- Elegy II, for string quartet and piano (1969)
- Eight Preludes, for piano (1974)
- Four Preludes, for piano (1975)
- Tableau I, for flute and piano (1975)
- Tableau II, for flute and piano (1975)

== Citations and references ==
=== Cited sources ===
- Gehlhaar, Rolf. 1968. Zur Komposition Ensemble: Kompositionsstudio Karlheinz Stockhausen, Internationale Ferienkurse für Neue Musik, Darmstadt 1967. Darmstädter Beiträge zur Neuen Musik 11. Edited by Ernst Thomas. Mainz: B. Schott's Söhne. (Text in both German and English.)
- Maimets, Kaire. 2000. "Images: Rondes d’automne: Sõmeri ja Schenkeri teemadel." (in Estonian)
- Remme, Anneli. 2001. "Debussy, Tubin, Ravi Shankar—Tähtis on elamus muusikast: Intervjuu muusikaprofessor Avo Sõmeriga." (in Estonian)
