= David Ahern =

Australian composer and music critic

- Born: 2 November 1947; Sydney, Australia
- Died: 31 January 1988 (aged 40)
- Occupations: Composer and music critic
- Notable work: Ned Kelly Music
- Style: Avant-garde

David Anthony Ahern (2 November 1947 – 31 January 1988) was an Australian composer and music critic, who became a prominent artist in the avant-garde genre after his best-known work, Ned Kelly Music, was released and performed at the Sydney Proms music series.

Born and raised in Sydney, Ahern decided to become a composer in his mid-teens, and studied composition under Nigel Butterley and Richard Meale. His first performed work, After Mallarmé, was recorded by the South Australian Symphony Orchestra and was submitted to the International Rostrum of Composers in Paris. He travelled in Europe in the 1960s, studying under Karlheinz Stockhausen in Germany and Cornelius Cardew in London.

In 1970, Ahern returned to Australia where, influenced by the Scratch Orchestra co-founded by Cardew, he formed the AZ Music ensemble at the Sydney Conservatorium of Music, which included such composers and performers as Roger Frampton.

== Early life ==
David Ahern was born on 2 November 1947 in Sydney. As a young boy, he learned how to play the violin and taught himself composition and piano. At the age of 15 he decided that he undoubtedly wanted to become a composer, and within a year he had already composed over 50 pieces. Then he began studying with Nigel Butterley and, later, Richard Meale. Ahern approached Butterley for lessons, and they had a couple of sessions together before he began working under the direction of Meale.

During his time with Meale, Ahern had written his first performed composition, After Marllarmé. The piece was performed and recorded by the South Australian Symphony Orchestra and conducted by Patrick Thomas. Although John Hopkins immediately inducted After Marllarmé into the 1967 International Rostrum of Composers in Paris, France, Meale was critical of the piece. In a later interview Meale described his knowledge of music theory and style of composition as basic and underdeveloped.

During 1968, Ahern followed Karlheinz Stockhausen and his studies at his International New Music summer course (Musik für ein Haus project) in Darmstadt and the Cologne New Music course. After that, Ahern made his way to London to study with Cornelius Cardew. While he attended Cardew's classes at Morley College, Ahern fell in love with the scene that Cardew was cultivating in the city.

Following his time with Stockhausen and Cardew, Ahern returned to Sydney in late 1969 and was inspired to create a weekly course in experimental music called "Laboratory of the Creative Ear," which later evolved into an ensemble called AZ Music which was influenced by Cardew’s Scratch Orchestra. The ensemble performed largely improvised works and consisted of a number of young performers and composers.

== Career ==
Ahern wrote many compositions between 1970 and 1975. Among them were Reservoirs (1970), a set of three verbal compositions called Stereo/Mono (1971), a live performance of electronic work for wind soloist and utilizing feedback; The Rudiments of Music (1973), a chapter to Journal (1968) that attempted to establish basic elements necessary for making music. He also founded an improvisation group with two other people called “Teletopia” in 1970, but it disbanded in 1972.

Although it is widely believed that Ahern completely stopped composing after his ineffectual performance of HiLo (1975), there are two pieces called Question of time and Rainbow mediation which are now known to come from as late as 1985. Despite the appearance of Ahern's halted career, due largely to his alcoholism, Meale is said to have worked with Ahern again in the early 1980s after reuniting with his former student in Adelaide. Around this time, Ahern was studying Bartók with the intent to compose a violin sonata.

== Style ==
His music was described as ‘daring and bizarre’ by some Australian critics, others characterized his pieces as “a scrambled compendium of noises, some born of musical instrument," and "produced by all manner involving childish fun”. Ahern’s style was a mix between ideas that he had picked up in Europe with ideas that he was taught from Australia.

In interviews with his former mentors and members of AZ Music, there were a wide range of opinions of his skills on the violin. Butterley described his playing as "not very well" and sounding like "squeaky funny things on the violin." Geoffrey Barnard, a former member of AZ music said he was "quite a competent violinist." Hopkins recalls a concert performance that was appalling but "with such conviction that this was what the violin should sound like." Peter Sculthorpe was inspired by his commitment to the instrument and how he was able to draw the listener in with his "dyslexic playing of the violin."

During the length of Ahern's career, Australia sought to preserve the genre and style of classical European music. The compositions in AZ music and Teletopia challenged those principles by embedding a "unique radical consciousness into the Australian music psyche."

== Compositions ==
Ahern composed pieces for orchestras, chamber ensembles, small groups, soloists and film scores. He is known for experimenting with non-musical instruments and objects to create the eccentric sounds found in his compositions. Ahern is known to have submitted to the Australian Music Centre a list of works that were composed in 1969, but were either lost or withdrawn. There are no known scores for Arabesque for 48 Strings, Chameleon , The call of the birds unwoke me, Question of time (1985) or Rainbow meditations (1985).

- After Mallarmé (1966) – for full orchestra
- Atomis (1966)
- Auriga wind quartet (1966)
- String Quartet (1966)
- Nocturnes of love (1966) – for chamber orchestra
- Annunciations (1967) – for orchestra
- Arabesque for 48 strings (1967)
- Music for Nine (1967) – for chamber ensemble for flute, clarinet, percussion, piano, violins, viola and cello.
- Ned Kelly Music (1967) – for full orchestra and presented by Project New Music
- Chameleon (1968) – Choral music
- Network (1968) – for several players
- Take II (1968) – magnetic tape (co‐composed with Trevor Denham)
- Journal (1969) – a radiophonic piece
- Reservoirs (1970) – three verbal compositions, for any number of players
- Musikit (1971) – for any number of players
- Stereo/Mono (1971) – for two wind players and feedback
- The Rudiments of Music (1973) – for piano, percussion, string quartet and choir
- CineMusic (1973) – film (assisted by Phillip Noyce)
- Gesture (1974) – for conductor and ensemble
- HiLo (1975) – for orchestra
- Question of time (1985)
- Rainbow mediation (1985)

=== Compositions without dates ===
- Ear – for sine wave generators and ears
- Reservoirs for any sound producing objects
- The call of the birds unwoke me

== Death ==
After six years as principal sound lecturer at Sydney College of the Arts, followed by other, largely unsuccessful career changes caused by his acute alcoholism, Ahern died unexpectedly from an asthma attack at the age of 40 on 31 January 1988. Little was spoken of him other than obscure documentation of his work that is limited to journals from performers in his music groups, interviews from former colleagues and mentors, and a few mentions in a handful of books and newspaper articles.
