= Thomas Wells (composer) =

American classical composer

Thomas H. Wells (born January 8, 1945, in Austin, Texas) is an American composer, pianist, organist, and arts-organization administrator.

== Biography ==
Thomas Wells began his formal composition studies at the University of Texas at Austin in 1960 with Kent Kennan and Clifton Williams. He received his Bachelor of Music (1966) and D.M.A. (1969) degrees from that institution, studying with Hunter Johnson. Wells founded the University of Texas Electronic Music Studio in 1967 and served as its director until 1975. He was accepted in Karlheinz Stockhausen's Composition Studio in Darmstadt in 1968, and participated in the project Musik für ein Haus. Wells joined the faculty of the Ohio State University School of Music in 1976, and continues to teach there as Professor of Composition and Director of the Sound Synthesis Studios. In addition, he has served as guest professor and artist in residence at the University of Novi Sad (Serbia), Johannes Gutenberg University (Mainz), and Ball State University. His works have been performed throughout the U.S., Europe, Japan, and Korea, and by orchestras and ensembles such as the Dallas Symphony Orchestra, Spokane Symphony, Columbus Symphony, and the Pittsburgh New Music Ensemble.

He has received grants and commissions from the National Endowment for the Arts, Ohio Arts Council, Ohio Humanities Council, Pennsylvania Council on the Arts, and the Texas Commission on the Arts. Wells received the Governor's Award in the State of Ohio for Outstanding Individual Artist in 1990. He hosted the 1984 Society of Composers National Conference (Frank Zappa, keynote speaker), and the 1989 International Computer Music Conference, both at The Ohio State University in Columbus, Ohio. He is active in the 1500-member Society of Composers, serving as its president from 2002 to the present.

== Musical style and influences ==
Wells' instrumental music is strongly influenced by Varèse, Stockhausen, electroacoustic music, and spectral music.

== Selected compositions ==
- Tango Orillero for piano (2011) 4'
- Souvenirs/Resolutions for trumpet ensemble (2011) 10'
- Concerto for Alto Saxophone and Saxophone Octet (2010) 14'
- Premonitions for alto saxophone, computer-generated sounds (2010) 13'
- Mersenne's Dream for alto saxophone, computer-generated sounds (2009) 11'
- Sechs Trakl Gesänge for tenor, chorus, orchestra (2008) 45'
- Concerto for Flute and Chamber Orchestra (2005) 30'
- Ehlecatl for flute solo (2003) 7'
- Riflessioni for Chamber Orchestra (2003) 12'
- Voces Intimae, electroacoustic music (2003)
- Kisa, electroacoustic music (2002) 8'
- Aus tiefer Not for clarinet solo (2001) 7'
- Adieu for wind ensemble (1999) 14'
- Into Darkness, electroacoustic music (1997) 7'
- Threnos for saxophone quartet, percussion (1997) 12'
- Concerto for Piano and Chamber Orchestra (1992) 28'

== Discography ==
- Thomas Wells. 1987. 11.2.72, Electronic Music. CRI (LP), SD443
- Thomas Wells. 2002. Echoes from the Southern: A Ragtime Overture. ProMusica: Live at the Southern; ProMusica Chamber Orchestra of Columbus (CD 2001).
