= Aus den sieben Tagen =

Set of compositions by Karlheinz Stockhausen

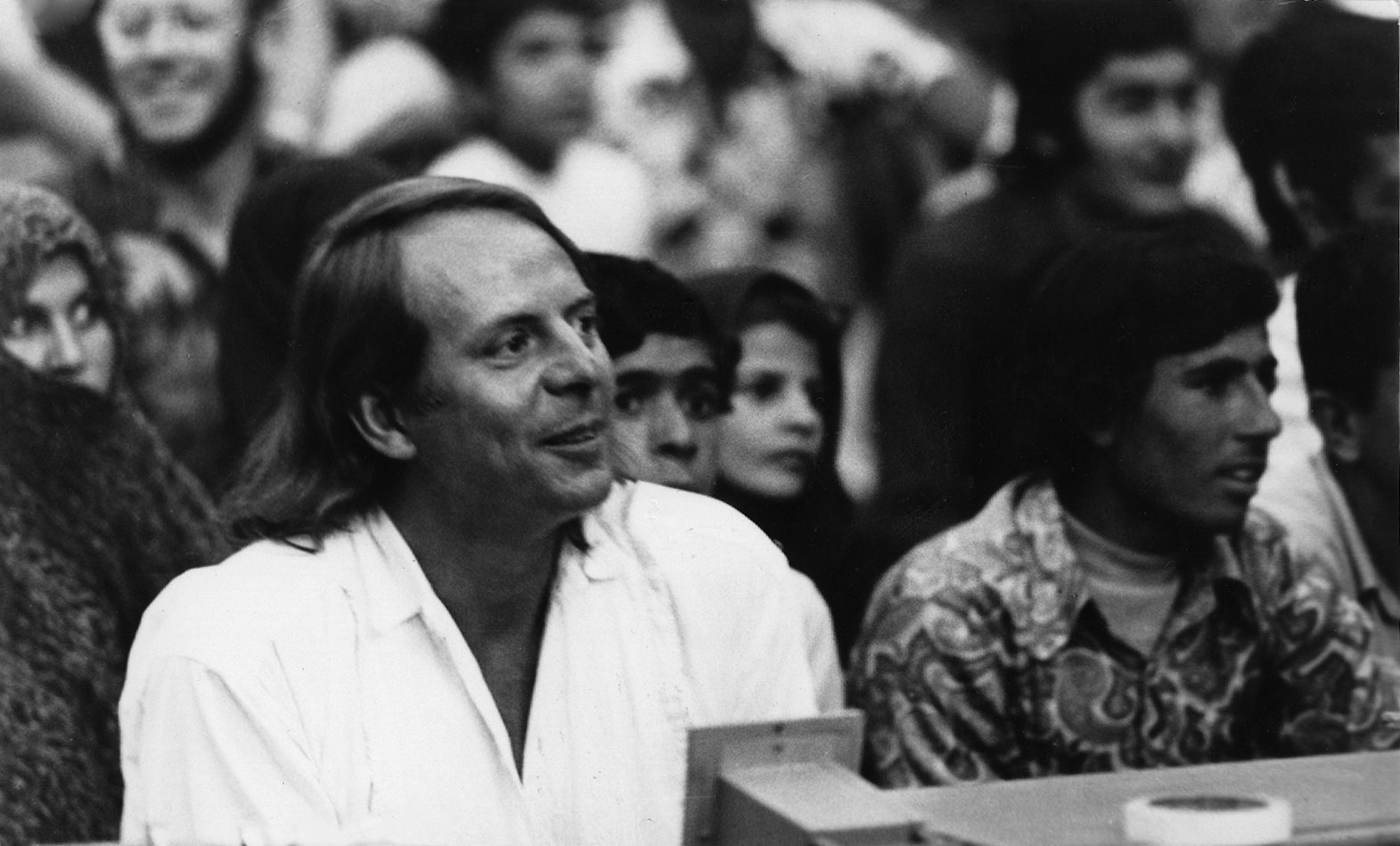
Karlheinz Stockhausen on 2 September 1972 at the Shiraz-Persepolis Festival of Arts, where parts of Aus den sieben Tagen were performed on 7 September

Aus den sieben Tagen (From the Seven Days) is a collection of 15 text compositions by Karlheinz Stockhausen, composed in May 1968, in reaction to a personal crisis, and characterized as "Intuitive music"—music produced primarily from the intuition rather than the intellect of the performer(s). It is Work Number 26 in the composer's catalog of works.

== History ==
The seven days of the title were 7–13 May 1968. Although this coincided with the beginning of the May 1968 protests and general strike in Paris, Stockhausen does not appear to have been aware of them at the time. These texts were written at Stockhausen's home in Kürten during the first five of those days, at night or late in the evening. During daylight hours, including the remaining two days, Stockhausen wrote "many poems", as well as reading Satprem's book on Sri Aurobindo, and experienced "many extraordinary things". Some of the poems appear in Stockhausen's third volume of Texte zur Musik.

The first of the pieces to be officially premiered was Es, performed in Brussels on 15 December 1968 on a concert of the Rencontre de Musique Contemporaine, by the Stockhausen Group, joined by Michel Portal, Jean-Pierre Drouet, and Jean-François Jenny-Clark. Setz die Segel zur Sonne followed, as part of a concert at the Théâtre National Populaire, Palais de Chaillot in Paris, on 30 May 1969. However, an earlier, unofficial performance of both Es and Treffpunkt, by the Arts Laboratory Ensemble with Hugh Davies and trombonist Vinko Globokar with Stockhausen at the potentiometers, took place on 25 November 1968 in London, as part of the Macnaghten Concerts.) Unbegrenzt was first given 26 July 1969 during the Nuits de la Fondation Maeght in St Paul de Vence, by Guy Arnaud, Harald Bojé, Jean-François Jenny-Clark, Jean-Pierre Drouet, Johannes G. Fritsch, Roy Hart, Diego Masson, Michel Portal, Michael Vetter, and the composer. An "ill-fated" performance of the theatre piece Oben und Unten was attempted in Amsterdam at the Holland Festival on 22 June 1969. The three actors were Sigrid Koetse (woman), Jan Retèl (man), and Keesjan van Deelen (child), with the instrumentalists of the Stockhausen Group and the composer doing the sound projection. Goldstaub was only performed for the first time (though without an audience) for the DG recording made at Stockhausen's house in Kürten on 20 August 1972, by Péter Eötvös (electrochord, keisu, and rin), Herbert Henck (voice, sitar, cooking pot with some water, two small bells, ship bell), Michael Vetter (voice, hands, recorder), and the composer (voice, conch horn, large cowbell, keisu, 14 rin, jug and key with water, kandy drum, pellet-bells on a strap).

Stockhausen described as "crucial" an orchestral performance in London of Set sail for the Sun on 14 January 1970, in which the BBC Symphony Orchestra, rehearsed by the composer, was distributed around the audience in four groups, each with a "core player" from the Stockhausen Group. Other notable performances include the 1969 Darmstädter Ferienkurse, when the groups that had just finished the recordings for DG performed eleven of the texts in four public seminars, on 1–4 September in the Städtische Sporthalle am Böllenfalltor, many of the texts in multiple daily performances from 14 March to 14 September 1970 in the spherical auditorium of the German pavilion at Expo '70 in Osaka, and at the 1972 Shiraz Arts Festival, where a day of "Music in the City" on 7 September featured several component pieces of Aus den sieben Tagen performed at various places in the inner city from dawn to dusk.

== Content ==
The fifteen constituent pieces are:

1. Richtige Dauern (Right Durations), for ca. 4 players
2. Unbegrenzt (Unlimited), for ensemble
3. Verbindung (Connection), for ensemble
4. Treffpunkt (Meeting Point), for ensemble
5. Nachtmusik (Night Music), for ensemble
6. Abwärts (Downward), for ensemble
7. Aufwärts (Upward), for ensemble
8. Oben und Unten (Above and Below), theater piece, for a man, a woman, a child, and 4 instrumentalists
9. Intensität (Intensity), for ensemble
10. Setz die Segel zur Sonne (Set Sail for the Sun), for ensemble
11. Kommunion (Communion), for ensemble
12. Litanei (Litany), for speaker or choir
13. Es (It), for ensemble
14. Goldstaub (Gold Dust), for ensemble
15. Ankunft (Arrival), for speaker or speaking choir

Often regarded as meditation exercises or prayers, all but two of these texts nonetheless describe in words specific musical events: "I don't want some spiritistic sitting—I want music! I don't mean something mystical, but rather everything completely direct, from concrete experience". Despite the manner of notation, Stockhausen's approach remains essentially serial:

In his cycle FROM THE SEVEN DAYS Stockhausen attempts to find musical answers to such fundamental questions regarding the conditions of a harmonious interplay of spirit and matter, which correspond to his serial process thinking and to the maxims of the experimental production of the sound material by composing temporally ordered pulses. . . . As a composer he wants to mediate between the extremes rather than to just follow the preconception of a linear development from the fragmentary and dissonant to the whole and harmonious.

Each text focuses on one or several of Stockhausen's main artistic concerns, such as extending the listener's perceptions of time and pitch, reconciling opposing tendencies, or shifting awareness from one perceptual area to another. Specific earlier works may be reflected in certain of the texts. Intensität, for example, suggests a passage from Kontakte, and Unbegrenzt recalls large parts of Carré. The influence of performing Prozession and Kurzwellen can be heard in the recordings made by Stockhausen's own ensemble. In addition, pianist Aloys Kontarsky frequently alludes to Stockhausen's Klavierstücke (especially Klavierstück IX in Abwärts) and Harald Bojé sometimes evokes Kontakte with his electronium.

The most detailed text is the central one, Oben und Unten, which gives instructions for three actors and a group of instrumentalists. Twelve of the other pieces describe musical processes or states, in three different general types, and the remaining two, Litanei and Ankunft are more in the nature of manifestos, to be read aloud either by a single speaker or a speaking choir. In 1997, Stockhausen made a performing version of the former text, considerably reworked under the title Litanei 97, for a speaking choir with occasional sung interjections. This was given the separate work number 74 in Stockhausen's catalogue of works.

== Related works ==
Between 1968 and 1971, Stockhausen composed a companion set of 17 text pieces, titled Für kommende Zeiten (For Times to Come). There are two further text compositions, Ylem (1972) and Herbstmusik (1974), though they are not actually described as "intuitive music", and are considerably more detailed "scripts" for what amount to a large "statistical" structure (Ylem) and a theatre piece (Herbstmusik) with certain features of moment form.

== Discography ==
In chronological order of recording:

- Stockhausen: Aus den sieben Tagen (Setz die Segel zur Sonne and Verbindung). Ensemble Musique Vivante (Aloys Kontarsky, Michel Portal, Johannes Fritsch, Alfred Alings, Rolf Gehlhaar, Harald Bojé, Jean-Pierre Drouet, Jean-François Jenny-Clark, Karlheinz Stockhausen) directed by Diego Masson. LP recording, stereo, 12-inch, 33 1/3 rpm. Recorded June 1969. Harmonia Mundi Musique Vivante 30 889 M. Arles: Harmonia Mundi, 1970. Reissued as Harmonia Mundi Musique D'Abord HMA 55795(LP); Harmonia Mundi HMA 190795 (CD), 1998; Harmonia Mundi HMX 290862.64 (3-CD set). Also released on LP as Stockhausen: Flight Towards The Sun: Liaison. Record Society Edition NO. S/6425 (Australia). Setz die Segel zur Sonne also reissued on Stockhausen: Brief an Heinrich 1969; 2 Interviews 1970. Stockhausen Text-CD 20. Kürten: Stockhausen-Verlag, 2008.
- Stockhausen: Illimité. (Unbegrenzt). Vinko Globokar, Carlos Roqué Alsina, Jean-François Jenny-Clark, Jean-Pierre Drouet, Michel Portal, Karlheinz Stockhausen. Recorded August 1969. LP recording, stereo, 12 in., 33 1/3 rpm. Shandar SR10 002. Paris: Shandar, 1970. Later reissued as part of DGG 7-LP set 2720 073.
- Stockhausen: Aus den sieben Tagen/From the Seven Days/Venu des sept jours. (Richtige Dauern, Unbegrenzt, Verbindung, Treffpunkt (two versions), Nachtmusik, Abwärts, Aufwärts, Intensität, Setz die Segel zur Sonne, Kommunion, Es, Goldstaub) Cologne Group (Alfred Alings, Harald Bojé, Rolf Gehlhaar, Johannes Fritsch, Aloys Kontarsky, Karlheinz Stockhausen); Paris Group (Carlos Roque Alsina, Jean-Pierre Drouet, Vinko Globokar, Jean-François Jenny-Clark, Michel Portal). All except Goldstaub recorded August 1969. In Goldstaub only: Péter Eötvös, Herbert Henck, Michael Vetter, Karlheinz Stockhausen. Recorded in Kürten, 20 August 1972. LP recording, stereo, 12-inch, 33 1/3 rpm, seven-disc set. DG 2720 073. [Hamburg]: Polydor International GmbH, 1974.
  - Es and Aufwärts single-disc issue DG 2530 255. Hamburg: Deutsche Grammophon, 1973.
  - Kommunion and Intensität single-disc issue DG 2530 256. Hamburg: Deutsche Grammophon, 1973.
  - Goldstaub single-disc issue, DG Collector's Series. DG 410935-1. Hamburg: Deutsche Grammophon, 1985.
- Karlheinz Stockhausen: Aus den sieben Tagen/From the Seven Days. (Richtige Dauern, Unbegrenzt, Verbindung, Treffpunkt (two versions), Nachtmusik, Abwärts (two versions), Aufwärts, Intensität, Setz die Segel zur Sonne, Kommunion, Es (two versions), Goldstaub.) 7-CD set: stereo, 12 cm. Stockhausen Complete Edition CD 14. Reissue of all of the material from the DGG 7-LP set plus second performances of Abwärts and Es. Kürten: Stockhausen-Verlag, 1993.
- Stockhausen: Short Wave; Set Sail for the Sun. Negative Band (Michael Fink, percussion; Earl Howard, alto saxophone; Denman Maroney, piano; David Simons, percussion; Joseph Paul Taylor, synthesizer; Jonathan Weisberger, sound projection). recording of Setz die Segel zur Sonne. Recorded 29 May 1974 in the Theatre Vanguard, Los Angeles. LP recording, stereo, 12-inch, 33-1/3 rpm. Finnadar SR 9009. [New York]: Finnadar Records, 1975.
- Zeitgeist: Bowers/DeMars/Stockhausen. Stockhausen: Setz die Segel zur Sonne. Zeitgeist (James DeMars, piano; Joseph Holmquist, marimba, cymbals, gongs, tam-tam; Jay Johnson, vibraphone, piano etc.; Thomas Hubbard, electric bass; Homer Lambrecht, trombone; Patrick Moriarty, alto saxophone). Recorded 1976. LP recording. The Sound Environment Recording Series 37662. Lincoln, Nebraska: Sound Environment Recording Corporation, [1977].
- Not Much Noise. Stockhausen: Treffpunkt. Mike Zwerin Jazz Trio (Mike Zwerin, trombone; Christian Escoude, guitar; Gus Nemeth, bass). Recorded 31 October – 1 November 1978, Gafinel Studios, Paris. American Artist Series. LP recording. Spotlite SPJLP 19.
- Karlheinz Stockhausen: Piano Music. Litanei (collage version composed of fragments from piano compositions by Stockhausen put together by Elisabeth Klein). With A One-Page Version of Karlheinz Stockhausen's Plus-Minus (1963) for solo piano by Nils Holger Petersen, Klavierstücke V, IX, and XI (two versions), and Tierkreis. Elisabeth Klein (piano). Recorded 14–15 August 1998 in the Levin Salen at the Norwegian State Academy of Music, Norges Musikkhøgskole. CD recording, stereo, 12 cm. Classico CLASSCD 269. [Frederiksberg]: Olufsen Records, 1999. Reissued 2003 on Membran/Scandinavian Classics 220555.
- Spielformen der Improvisation. Musik in Deutschland 1950–2000, vol. 124: Konzertmusik: Instrumentale Kammermusik: Moderne Ensembles: Porträt. Karlheinz Stockhausen: Setz die Segel zur Sonne (Ensemble für Intuitive Musik Weimar: Matthias von Hintzenstern, cello; Michael von Hintzenstern, piano; Hans Tutschku, synthesizer/live electronics); Hans Zender: Modelle II, III, VI, X, and XI (Radio-Sinfonie-Orchester Frankfurt; Hans Zender, Burkhard Rempe); Hans-Joachim Hespos: Bigu (Ensemble Zeitkratzer); Hermann Keller: Ex tempore no. 6 (Keller-Schulze-Werkstattorchester: Helmut Saxe, flute; Manfred Hering, alto saxophone; Helmut Forsthoff, tenor saxophone; Manfred Schulze, clarinet, baritone saxophone; Nicolaus Richter de Vroe, violin; Wilfried Staufenbiel, cello; Hermann Keller, piano; Klaus Christian Kaufmann, percussion); Manfred Stahnke: Lumpengalerie (Manfred Stahnke Ensemble Est! Est!! Est!!!); Phosphor (Burkhard Beins, percussion; Alessandro Bosetti, saxophone; Axel Dörner, trumpet/electronics; Robin Hayward, tuba; Annette Krebs, electro-acoustic guitar; Andrea Neumann, inside piano/mixing-desk; Michael Renkel, acoustic guitar; Ignaz Schick, electronics): P I. CD recording: stereo, 12 cm. RCA Read [sic] Seal LC 00316; RCA Red Seal BMG Classics 74321 73664 2. [Munich]: BMG Ariola, 2005.
- Karlheinz Stockhausen: Litanei 97; Kurzwellen. SWR-Vokalensemble, Rupert Huber (cond.). Recorded 28–30 June 2000at SWR Stuttgart. Harald Bojé, electronium; Alfred Alings and Rolf Gehlhaar, tamtam; Johannes Fritsch, viola; Aloys Kontarsky, piano; Karlheinz Stockhausen, sound projection and filters. CD recording: stereo, 12 cm. Stockhausen Complete Edition CD 61. Kürten: Stockhausen-Verlag, 2000.
- Old School: Zeitkratzer: Karlheinz Stockhausen. (Unbegrenzt, Verbindung, Nachtmusik, Intensität, and Setz die Segel zur Sonne) Ensemble Zeitkratzer, Reinhold Friedl (dir.), Martin Wurmnest (sound projection). Recorded live 12 April 2011 at Kino Šiška, Ljubljana, Slovenia, and 14 April 2011 at Vatroslav Lisinski Concert Hall, Zagreb, Croatia. CD recording, stereo. Zeitkratzer Records ZKR 0012. [Berlin]: Zeitkratzer Productions, 2011.
- Stockhausen: Aus den sieben Tagen (Unbegrenzt, Verbindung, Nachtmusik, Intensität, and Setz dieSegel zur Sonne). Ensemble Zeitkratzer, Reinhold Friedl (dir.), with Keiji Haino, voice; recorded and mixed by Martin Wurmnest. Recorded live at the Jahrhunderthalle Bochum during theRuhrtriennale. Zeitkratzer Records ZKR 0019 / LC 18747. [Berlin]: Zeitkratzer Productions, 2016.
- Karlheinz Stockhausen: Set Sail for the Sun. Salt Lake Electric Ensemble. [Date and venue of recording unknown.] CD Baby 1 90394 14793 8. [Portland, OR]: CD Baby, n.d.
