= Kamasutra: Vollendung der Liebe =

Kamasutra: Vollendung Der Liebe

Soundtrack album by Inner Space Production (Can)
- Released: 22 November 2009
- Recorded: November 1968
- Genre: Experimental rock; psychedelic rock; blues rock
- Length: 50:26
- Label: Crippled Dick Hot Wax!

Inner Space Production (Can) chronology
Agilok & Blubbo (2009)	Kamasutra: Vollendung Der Liebe (2009)	The Lost Tapes (2012)

Singles from Kamasutra: Vollendung der Liebe
- 1. ""Kama Sutra" / "I'm Hiding My Nightingale"" Released: 1969

Professional ratings
Review scores
Source	Rating
Allmusic	3.5/5 stars

Kamasutra: Vollendung der Liebe is the soundtrack to the West German documentary film of the same name (1969), written by Innerspace Productions, an early name for the krautrock band Can, and officially released in 2009 by "Crippled Dick Hot Wax!". Initially, the film's producers commissioned only Irmin Schmidt to work on the soundtrack, finished with the contribution from Innerspace Productions.

== Background ==
Rob Young, the Can's biographer, felt the parts of the soundtrack were "as conventional as the Inner Space ever sounded" and unrecognizable from their previous recordings featured on Delay 1968. "In Kalkutta III" is marked by thumping, hypnotic funk-rock grooves, "Im Tempel" and "Im Orient" touched by "eastern-tinged psychedelia", and "Mundharmonika Beat" leads the band into the "bluesy, proto-krautrock" direction. The soundtrack has streaks of Indo jazz sounds, keeping to Indian aesthetics of the film.

Two tracks of Kamasutra have appeared on other Can compilation albums, under different titles and with a different mix: "There Was A Man" was previously released in a longer form on Delay 1968 as "Man Named Joe", and "Indisches Panorama V" appeared on The Lost Tapes as "Obscura Primavera".

Kamasutra is a partially lost film. The only known surviving scene features Innerspace performing "I'm Hiding My Nightingale" with Margarete Juvan.

The band had a higher advance for completing the soundtrack for Kamasutra, compared to Agilok & Blubbo, but they had to press the Kamasutra's producer to deliver the payment.

== Legacy ==
"I'm Hiding My Nightingale" would appear as a B-side to the album's only single "Kama Sutra" (listed here as "Indisches Panorama I"), only credited to Irmin Schmidt. In 2015, "I'm Hiding My Nightingale" was covered by White Magic. This version featured Ariel Pink on guitar accompaniment and was released on the eponymous I'm Hiding My Nightingale EP.

== Track listing ==
No.	Title	Length
1.	"Indisches Panorama I"	3:16
2.	"I'm Hiding My Nightingale"	3:23
3.	"There Was a Man"	1:07
4.	"Im Tempel"	7:30
5.	"In Kalkutta III"	2:16
6.	"Indisches Panorama II"	2:24
7.	"In Kalkutta I"	3:49
8.	"Im Orient"	1:34
9.	"Indisches Panorama III"	2:07
10.	"Mundharmonika Beat"	5:11
11.	"Indisches Panorama IV"	2:03
12.	"Indisches Panorama V"	3:11
13.	"Indisches Panorama VI"	1:59
14.	"Indische Liebesszene"	4:41
15.	"In Kalkutta II"	2:21
16.	"Im Orient II"	3:27

== Personnel ==
There are no credentials given in the liner notes. The presumed contributors, based on their typical contribution, are listed below.

- Irmin Schmidt - composer
- Malcolm Mooney - vocals on "There Was A Man"
- Jaki Liebezeit - drums
- Michael Karoli - guitar
- David C. Johnson - flute
- Holger Czukay - bass
- Margarete Juvan - vocals on "I'm Hiding My Nightingale"
