= Nicolaus A. Huber =

German composer

Nicolaus A. Huber (born 15 December 1939) is a German composer.

== Education ==
Huber was born in Passau. From 1958 to 1962, he studied music education at the Hochschule für Musik und Theater München and subsequently composition with Franz Xaver Lehner and Günter Bialas. He pursued his education further with Josef Anton Riedl, Karlheinz Stockhausen and, above all, with Luigi Nono. From 1974 until his retirement in 2003, Huber was Professor of Composition at the Folkwang Hochschule in Essen.

== Style and influences ==
Riedl and Schnebel inspired Huber's vocal and linguistic experiments. Riedl in particular encouraged Huber's radical tendencies. His treatment of musical material was most strongly formed by his contact with Stockhausen, while Nono inspired in him an acute historical and political (Marxist) awareness, particularly evident in his second compositional phase, beginning around 1969. Huber took part in Stockhausen's composition project Ensemble at the 1967 Darmstädter Ferienkurse, an experience that gave him an appreciation of the potential for improvisation—a factor that marks not only his compositions for conventional forces, but also his mixed- and multi-media experiments. Stockhausen's influence can also be seen in Huber's exploitation of space and the incorporation of extraneous elements, such as vocal utterances in instrumental music, as a means of heightening expression. His period of study with Luigi Nono in 1967–68 was even more influential on Huber. Nono encouraged Huber to seek a more thorough-going means of eradicating tonality, through a study of psychology in order to better understand human responses.

== Selected compositions ==
- Traummechanik for percussion and piano (1967)
- von ... bis ... for viola, harmonium, piano and percussion (1968)
- Aion for four-track tape and odors (1968/72)
- Harakiri for small orchestra and tape (1971)
- Gespenster for large orchestra, singer/speaker, and tape, on texts by Bertolt Brecht and Peter Maiwald (1976)
- Darabukka for piano (1976)
- dasselbe ist nicht dasselbe for snare drum (1978)
- Morgenlied for large orchestra (1980)
- Vor und zurück for oboe (1981)
- Six Bagatelles for chamber ensemble and tape (1981)
- Aus Schmerz und Trauer for alto saxophone or clarinet in B♭ (or Bassett horn) (1982)
- Trio mit Stabpandeira for viola, cello and double bass (1983)
- Demijour for oboe, violoncello, and piano (1985/86)
- Doubles, mit einem beweglichen Ton for string quartet (1987)
- Go Ahead. Musik für Orchester mit Shrugs (1988)
- Three Pieces for orchestra with breather/singer and obligato piano (1990/91)
- First play Mozart for solo flute (1993)
- Als eine Aussicht weit... for flute, viola and harp (1996)
- Covered with Music for soprano, flute, accordion, percussion, and contrabass (1997)
- ACH, DAS ERHABENE...(G. Benn) betäubte fragmente for two interlaced choirs of 36 voices (1999)
- Der entkommene Orpheus for four guitars (2001)
- O dieses Lichts! (G. Benn) for flute, violoncello, and piano (2002)
- Werden Fische je das Wasser leid? (Ch. Bukowski) Music with Neglect-Syndrome for soprano and instrumentalists (2003)
- EN for viola solo (2007)

== Political revues ==
- Don Quichotte und Sancho Pansa in den Irrungen und Wirrungen der westlichen Demokratie (1976, Düsseldorf)
- Hanna und Paul oder: Der Sozialismus kommt selten allein (1977, Düsseldorf)
- Faust, der Tragödie unbekannter Teil (1978/79, Bochum)
- Staatszirkus (1980, Nürnberg)

== Prizes ==
- Culture Prize for Music of the Stadt München (1969)
- Darmstadt Composition Prize (1970)
- Supporting Prize in Music from the Berlin Academy of Arts (1988)

== Writings ==
- 2000. Nicolaus A. Huber. Durchleuchtungen. Texte zur Musik 1964-1999, ed. by Josef Häusler. Wiesbaden: Breitkopf & Härtel. ISBN 3-7651-0328-4.
- 2002."'Die Zeit ist buchstabengenau und allbarmherzig'. Zu Hölderlin in meinen Kompositionen", Dissonanz, 76:4–13; 77:4–15.
- 2005. "Pour les Enfants du paradis. Kurze Charakterstücke für KlavierPlus" (2003) in: Hören und Sehen – Musik audiovisuell. Wahrnehmung im Wandel. Produktion—Rezeption—Analyse—Vermittlung. Veröffentlichungen des Instituts für Neue Musik und Musikerziehung 45, pp. 57–61. Mainz: Schott.
- 2006. "Über einige Beziehungen zu Bach (und Friedrich Hölderlin)". MusikTexte, no. 108 (February).
