= Agilok & Blubbo =

Soundtrack album by The Inner Space (Can)
- Released: 2 April 2009
- Recorded: October 1968 in Cologne, Germany
- Genre: Krautrock
- Length: 42:14
- Label: Wah Wah Records Supersonic Sounds
- Producer: Hans Wewerka

The Inner Space (Can) chronology
Can Live (1999)	Agilok & Blubbo (2009)	Kamasutra: Vollendung der Liebe (2009)

Singles from Agilok & Blubbo
- 1. ""Kamera Song" / "Agilok & Blubbo"" Released: 1969

Agilok & Blubbo is the soundtrack album featured in the 1969 German film of the same name. The songs on this album are the earliest recordings of the German experimental rock band The Inner Space, who would soon become known under the name Can. Years after the film had fallen into obscurity, its soundtrack was eventually licensed from Hans Wewerka's archives (album's producer) and released in Spain in 2009.

Along with the band's next soundtrack Kamasutra: Vollendung der Liebe, none of the Agilok & Blubbo material would be featured on Soundtracks, a 1970 compilation of songs the band had recorded for various late 60s-early 70s films. The tracks "Kamera Song" (sung by one of the film's actresses Rosemarie Heinikel) and "Agilok and Blubbo" were released together as a single in 1968.

== Background ==
Early in 1968, the film's director Peter F. Schneider commissioned composer Irmin Schmidt to provide a soundtrack for his future film. Schmidt got recommended to the director by the film's producer, Hans Wewerka, who previously published Irmin's Album für Mogli score. Around May 1968, Irmin created "a few tentative beginnings" on the soundtrack with the help of his friend David C. Johnson. At that time, he assembled a new experimental band, The Inner Space, who also joined the project.

The CD version of Agilok & Blubbo released in 2009 features two additional tracks recorded during the same sessions, but these tracks didn't make the cut for the final soundtrack. "Memographie" is a version of the film track "Es zieht herauf". "Hexapussy" was taken from Irmin's Album für Mogli recorded in 1967.

== Track listing ==
Side one
No.	Title	Length
1.	"Agilok and Blubbo"	7:06
2.	"Es zieht Herauf"	6:21
3.	"Dialog zwischen Birken"	4:11
4.	"Michele ist Da"	1:38
5.	"Mama Mama"	3:54
6.	"Kamerasong"	2:30
7.	"Zwischen den Bäumen"	3:56

Side two
No.	Title	Length
8.	"Zweige und Sonne"	0:14
9.	"Revolutionslied"	1:48
10.	"Der Letzte Brief"	1:26
11.	"Probleme"	2:14
12.	"Flop Pop"	3:33
13.	"Apokalypse"	10:25
Total length:		42:15

CD bonus tracks
No.	Title	Length
13.	"Memographie"	11:43
14.	"Hexapussy"	16:51
Total length:		28:34

== Personnel ==
- Irmin Schmidt – vocals, flute, guitar, music
- Jaki Liebezeit – drums
- Holger Czukay – bass
- Rosemarie Heinikel (credited as 'Rosy Rosy') – vocals on "Kamerasong"
- David C. Johnson – engineer, flute ("Memographie")
- Hans Wewerka – producer
