= Philippa Cullen =

Australian artist (1950–1975)

Philippa Ann Cullen (24 March 1950 – 3 July 1975) was an Australian dancer, choreographer, teacher and performance artist. She was notable for her innovative dance performances incorporating the use of the theremin and the development of movement-sensitive floors known as Vernus floors. From the late 1960s until 1974 she taught movement and dance at many venues, in Australia and overseas. Her most important classes took place on Sunday mornings in the University of Sydney Quadrangle, and were attended by dancers, actors, musicians and artists.

== Life and work ==
Born in Melbourne, Cullen became a pupil at the Bodenwieser Dance Studio, Sydney, at the age of eight. During her dance studies, she appeared in works choreographed by Margaret Chapple, Keith Bain and Jacqui Carroll including Bain's Primitive Suite. Cullen graduated from Sydney University with a Bachelor of Arts degree in 1970, majoring in English, Italian, Fine Arts and Medieval History.

Cullen performed across Sydney, at venues such as Hogarth Galleries, the Art Gallery of New South Wales and The Domain. Her artistic goal was to "free dancers from what she saw as the ‘tyranny’ of music by having them generate their own as they performed" by exploring new relationships between dance and electronic devices.

Cullen's first performance with theremin was in 1972, in collaboration with composer Greg Schiemer, electrical engineer Phil Connor and architecture student Manuel Nobleza. Homage to Theremin II consisted of four different shaped and sized theremins, each with its own antenna, which allowed her and her dancers to actually generate sound themselves. Her best known works are Utter and Lightless.

An Australia Council for the Arts grant in 1972 funded her travel to the UK and Europe, Africa, Nepal and India, including study at the Folkwang Hochschule in Essen. (Note: Jones 2004 claims Cullen studied with Pina Bausch, but Juers 2021 confirms she did not.) At the Institute of Sonology in Utrecht she studied electronics, mathematics and computer composition. It was here she developed ideas for pressure sensitive floors. She had met the composer Karlheinz Stockhausen during his brief tour of Australia in 1970 in Hobart. They corresponded and worked together in Germany from 1972 until 1974 and became lovers. During that time she inspired and developed the choreography and ideas for Inori, a meditative work in which a dancer conducts an orchestra with positions and gestures of prayer based on mudras. In July 1973 she and her dance ensemble performed with theremins at the Oeldorf Group.

After returning to Australia in early 1974, she organised, and with dancers and musicians performed at, a long Seminar held at Sydney’s Central Street Gallery (1–11 July). This was followed in September by performances at the Ewing Gallery in Melbourne, and the 24-Hour Concert at Sydney’s Hogarth Galleries in October, which included a twenty-four hour chess game and a tea ceremony. In early 1975 she performed in the Computers and Electronics section of the Australia 75 arts exhibition in Canberra, and at Mildura’s Sculpture Triennial.

Aged 25, Cullen died in Kodaikanal, Tamil Nadu, India, on 3 July 1975 from complications following an emergency appendectomy.

== Legacy ==
Cullen was the subject of an archival exhibition in 2016 curated by Stephen Jones, Dancing the music: Philippa Cullen 1950–75. An expanded version of this exhibition was held in 2023 at the McClelland Sculpture Park and Gallery in Melbourne; Iran Sanadzadeh performed on her pressure-sensitive floors, developed from Cullen's work. She is featured in the Know My Name exhibition at the National Gallery of Australia. The Dancer – A Biography for Philippa Cullen by Evelyn Juers was published by Giramondo in October 2021.

Cullen's Vernus floor were also partially replicated by performer and composer Iran Sanadzadeh in 2015 and she called these 'terpsichora pressure-sensitive floors', or 'The Floors'. She used these to perform at the 2021 Adelaide Fringe festival in a performance called Stories Told By A Ghost, A Book And A Room and was very much inspired by Cullen saying:

Cullen was a visionary Australian dancer, choreographer, experimental artist and designer. She spearheaded building new technologies for dance in the early 1970s with a range of large Theremins, pedestals, her own pressure-sensitive floors, and many other instruments she and her collaborators built.

'The Floors' later featured in a 2022 exhibition at the ANU School of Cybernetics entitled 'Multisensory Cybernetics: bodies, machines, and nature in dialogue'.

== Notes and references ==
Notes
