= ?Corporel =

Musical performance piece by Vinko Globokar

?Corporel is a 1985 musical performance piece by French-Slovenian composer Vinko Globokar. It calls for the performer to use their body as an instrument through the act of physically striking it while simultaneously employing audible vocalization techniques. According to the Los Angeles Philharmonic, ?Corporel is a protest against the notion that an instrument is limited to one sound, and a statement that every instrument can make several sounds. Performances of the work are frequently conducted barefoot and bare-chested, the latter practice leading to a degree of reticence among some female participants.The word corporel means "having to do with the body". It has also been said that ?Corporel "seems, on one level, to dehumanize the performer by transforming him into an instrument and stripping away the veneer of civilization."

== About the composer ==
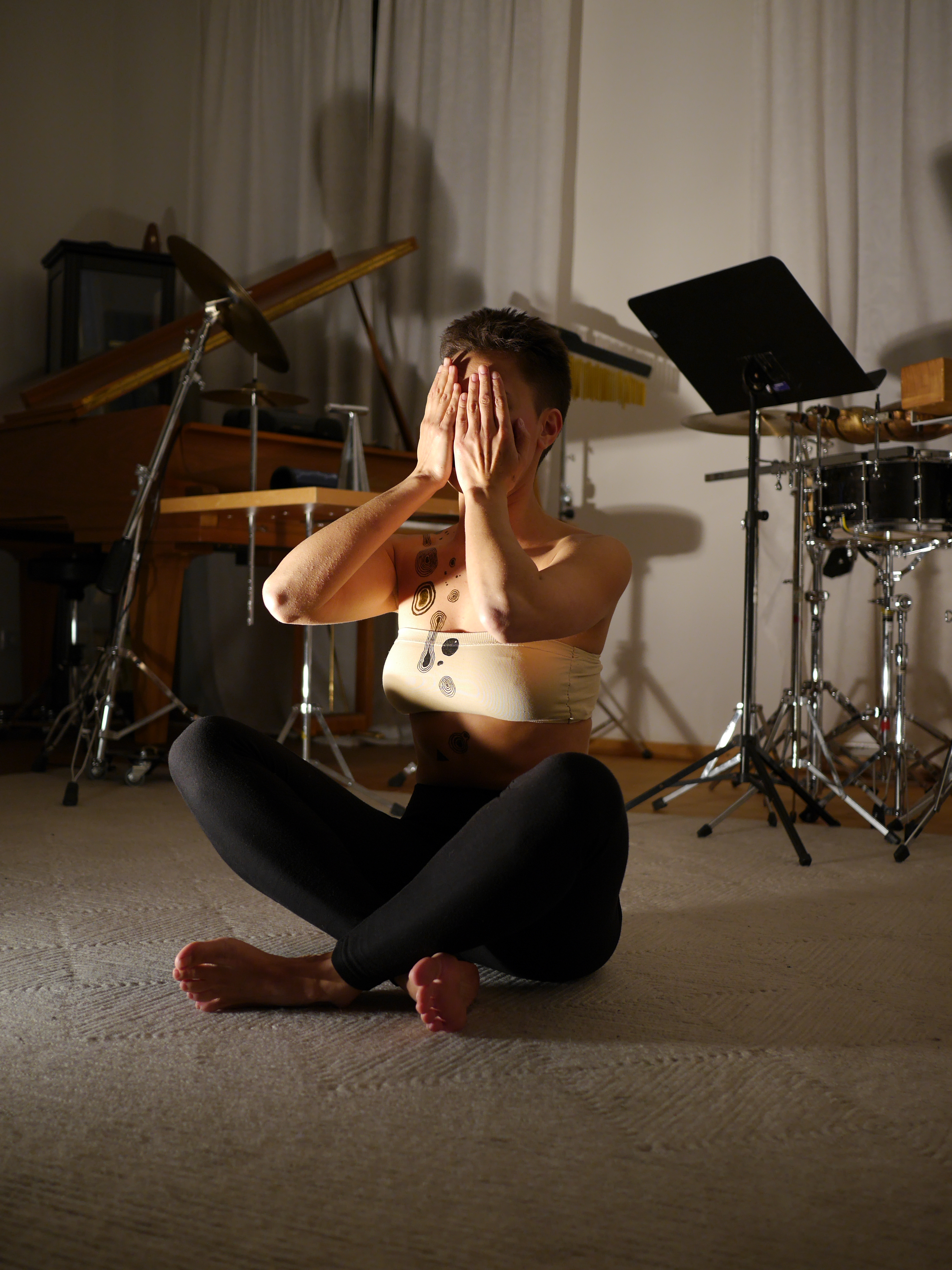
Performance of ?Corporel by Malika Maminova

Vinko Globokar is a French-Slovenian avant-garde trombonist and composer. He studied composition with Luciano Berio and Karlheinz Stockhausen and was influenced by Mauricio Kagel, a composer of instrumental theater pieces who was known for his unorthodox use of instruments to create a variety of sounds. Globokar's music focuses on creativity and free improvisation, with a heavy emphasis on the performer and their interpretation of the piece. Many researchers consider ?Corporel to be a protest against what he called "Badabum", the idea that one instrument can only make one sound, which led composers to add a new instrument to their pieces every time a new sound was needed rather than figuring out how to get new sounds out of the instruments already being used. Globokar asserted that every instrument can make more than one sound, even if those sounds aren't natural for the instrument, and he argues this point in ?Corporel by writing an entire piece that uses only the performer's body and voice as the instrument.

== Performance practice ==
Globokar instructs that ?Corporel is to be performed wearing canvas shorts, with a bare chest and bare feet. This allows the performer to strike their skin directly, producing a sound that can be heard in the audience much more easily than if they were striking themselves through clothing. However, this produces an issue for female percussionists who perform the piece. As percussionist Steven Schick writes, "It is admittedly a risky proposition for many musicians to perform shirtless. For women these issues are compounded." Several variations on the dress have been made by women who have performed the piece, from performing it completely shirtless as Globokar indicates to performing it completely clothed.

== Techniques ==
There are two main categories of sounds in ?Corporel: those produced by the voice and those produced by the performer striking their body. The vocal sounds can be further divided into exhalations on the consonants "h", "f", "s", "sch (shh)", and a rolled "r" and inhalations on the consonants "t", "p", "k", "g", and "d". Globokar also incorporates the extended vocal techniques of kissing sounds, high and low clucks of the tongue, inhalations on "ts", and open-throated inhales. Other sounds used include the chattering of teeth, hums, snores, screams of "Ah!" and, at one point, the recitation of a quote.

The percussive sounds in the piece are produced by the performer sliding their hands over their body at various speeds and striking bony and fleshy areas from the head down to the feet. Snaps and claps are also used in a small section of the piece. The exact areas used to produce bony and fleshy struck sounds are left to the discretion of the performer.

== Form ==
?Corporel is divided into six sections, which are separated by a fermata, a transitional section, and then another fermata. These sections progress from exploratory to progressively more frantic and violent. The progression is interrupted in the last section of the piece by the recitation of part of a poem by French poet René Char: "I recently read the following remark: The history of mankind is a long succession of synonyms for the same word. It is a duty to disprove this." After resuming the building of tension, the piece ends with a blow to the stomach, which Globokar writes should be performed "as if hitting somebody else." The performer gives one final yell of "Ah!" with the hit and ends the piece "doubled up", with "eyes bulging".

== Notation ==
The score for ?Corporel is hand-written. Globokar writes the piece on two staves, which correspond to the upper and lower halves of the body. Vocals are written on the highest part of the top staff. Globokar combines standard and graphic notation systems in ?Corporel. Rhythmic sections use standard notation with a strict meter and tempo, while gestural sections of the piece use graphic notation, with one centimeter of horizontal space corresponding to one second of sound or motion. Hard consonants are followed by rests, while soft consonants are followed by a line to indicate duration, direction, and speed. Rubbing gestures followed by a straight line are to be performed at a consistent speed, while motions followed by jagged lines are meant to speed up and slow down. Filled and open noteheads, respectively, are used to represent strikes to bony surfaces or hard consonants versus strikes on fleshy areas or extended vocal techniques. An 'x' is used as a notehead to represent finger snaps and hand claps. Chattering teeth are represented by vertical lines, and snores are drawn as vertical lines with arrows pointing in opposite directions. Globokar also includes written instructions about the position of the performer's body throughout the piece.

== Interpretations ==
In his book The Percussionist's Art, percussionist Steven Schick notes that the lack of clothing worn by the performer in ?Corporel undermines the audience's expectations about the concert experience. Percussionist Karlyn Mason states that the vulnerability of the performer allows the audience to identify with them. This relationship is added to by the humming, snoring, and yawning of the performer during the transitions. These are all actions that audience members can relate to, which makes it even more disturbing when the performer resumes beating themselves out of apparent madness.

These beatings are contrasted with the section in which the performer recites the text from Char's poem and "...is still, finally freed from the tasks of music and the tics of theater..." Globokar gives the option of reciting it in the original French or the language native to the place it is being performed and provides no instruction as to how the text is to be spoken. This leaves the performer to decide whether to interpret it as a moment of lucidity amidst madness or as the peak of insanity.

Ultimately, because the body is the instrument in ?Corporel, and no two bodies are the same, every interpretation and performance is different. Schick asserts that the issue of the body as both universal and unique is central to ?Corporel, and that the piece is rife with contradictions. He argues that the dichotomy between music and theater in the piece, and the attempt to unite them, is the cause of the performer's internal conflict and madness, because only when the two are combined can a cohesive identity be formed. This struggle builds until the last note of the piece, "...an image of extreme physical distress as a result of the outer expression of inner turmoil."
