= Boudewijn Buckinx =

Belgian composer and writer on music

Boudewijn Buckinx (born 28 March 1945, in Lommel) is a Belgian composer and writer on music.

Buckinx attended the Antwerp Conservatory, and from 1964 studied composition and serial music with Lucien Goethals in Ghent, where he also studied electronic music at the IPEM. In 1968 he attended Stockhausen's composition studio in Darmstadt and participated in the composition of Stockhausen's Musik für ein Haus, contributing a quintet for flute, oboe, bass clarinet, bassoon, and cello titled Atoom. However, his principal influences are Mauricio Kagel and John Cage. He also studied musicology at the Catholic University of Leuven, graduating in 1972 with a dissertation on Cage's Variations.

== Writings ==
- 1994. De kleine pomo: of, de muziekgeschiedenis van het postmodernisme. Peer: Alamire. ISBN 90-6853-084-4.
- 1999. (With Yves Knockaert). Muziek uit de voorbije eeuw. Peer: Alamire. ISBN 90-6853-141-7.
- 2001. Aria van de diepe noot: verzamelde commentaren. Peer: Alamire. ISBN 90-6853-148-4.

== Compositions (selective list) ==
- Sløjd, for mixed media (1968)
- Piotr Lunaire, for narrator, one singer, and piano (1985)
- Ce qu’on entend dans la salle de concert, for orchestra (1987)
- In de buurt van Neptunus, for cello and piano (1987)
- 1001 Sonatas, for violin and piano (1988)
- Symposion, for violin and string orchestra (1991)
- Nine Unfinished Symphonies (1992)
- Kahk Deelah, for solo violin (1994)
- Karoena de zeemeermin, chamber opera (1995)
- Concerto for Cello and Orchestra (1996)
- Het konijn for clarinet, piccolo, 2 violins, viola, cello and double bass (2000)
- String Quartet no. 15 (2003)
- Embarkation for Uropia, for orchestra (2004)
- Renaissance Revisited, for piano (2006)
- Piano Quartet no. 3, for violin, viola, cello, and piano (2007)
- Piano Quartet no. 4, for violin, viola, cello, and piano (2008)

== Cited sources ==
- Iddon, Martin. 2004. "The Haus That Karlheinz Built: Composition, Authority, and Control at the 1968 Darmstadt Ferienkurse". The Musical Quarterly 87, no. 1 (Spring): 87–118.
- Ritzel, Fred. 1970. Musik für ein Haus: Kompositionsstudio Karlheinz Stockhausen, Internationale Ferienkurse für Neue Musik, Darmstadt 1968. Darmstädter Beiträge zur Neuen Musik 12. Edited by Ernst Thomas. Mainz: B. Schott’s Söhne.
- Visscher, Eric de. 2001. "Buckinx, Boudewijn". The New Grove Dictionary of Music and Musicians, second edition, edited by Stanley Sadie and John Tyrrell. London: Macmillan Publishers.
