= Intuitive music =

Form of musical improvisation

Intuitive music is a form of musical improvisation based on instant creation in which fixed principles or rules may or may not have been given. It is a type of process music where instead of a traditional music score, verbal or graphic instructions and ideas are provided to the performers. The concept was introduced in 1968 by the German composer Karlheinz Stockhausen, with specific reference to the collections of text-notated compositions Aus den sieben Tagen (1968) and Für kommende Zeiten (1968–70). The first public performance of intuitive-music text compositions, however, was in the collective work Musik für ein Haus, developed in Stockhausen's 1968 Darmstadt lectures and performed on 1 September 1968, several months before the first realisations of any of the pieces from Aus den sieben Tagen.

Intuitive music may appear to be synonymous with free improvisation or with improvised playing within open composition forms, but the collectively intuitive aspect, the emancipation from known music genres and the meditative dimension are especially emphasized by Stockhausen: "I try to avoid the word improvisation because it always means there are certain rules: of style, of rhythm, of harmony, of melody, of the order of sections, and so on". Nevertheless, one critic finds that intuitive music is not in essence irrational, but that for Stockhausen intuition must become a controllable ability, and therefore is an instrument of the project of modernity: "the investigation and instrumentalization of the world by controlled procedures".

At the 1968 Darmstadt composition seminar where the intuitive-music concept was central for the group composition Musik für ein Haus, Stockhausen himself emphasised that it has nothing to do with indeterminacy: "I do not want a spiritualistic seance—I want music! I do not mean anything mystical, but everything direct, from concrete experience. What I have in mind is not indeterminacy, but intuitive determinacy!"

== See also ==
- Meditation music
