= David C. Johnson =

American composer

David C. Johnson (January 30, 1940, in Batavia, New York – October 28, 2021, in Basel) was an American composer, flautist, and performer of live electronic music.

== Life and career ==
Johnson studied, among other places, at Harvard University (M.A. in composition 1964), with Nadia Boulanger in Paris, and at the Cologne Courses for New Music in 1964–1965, 1965–1966, and 1966–1967.

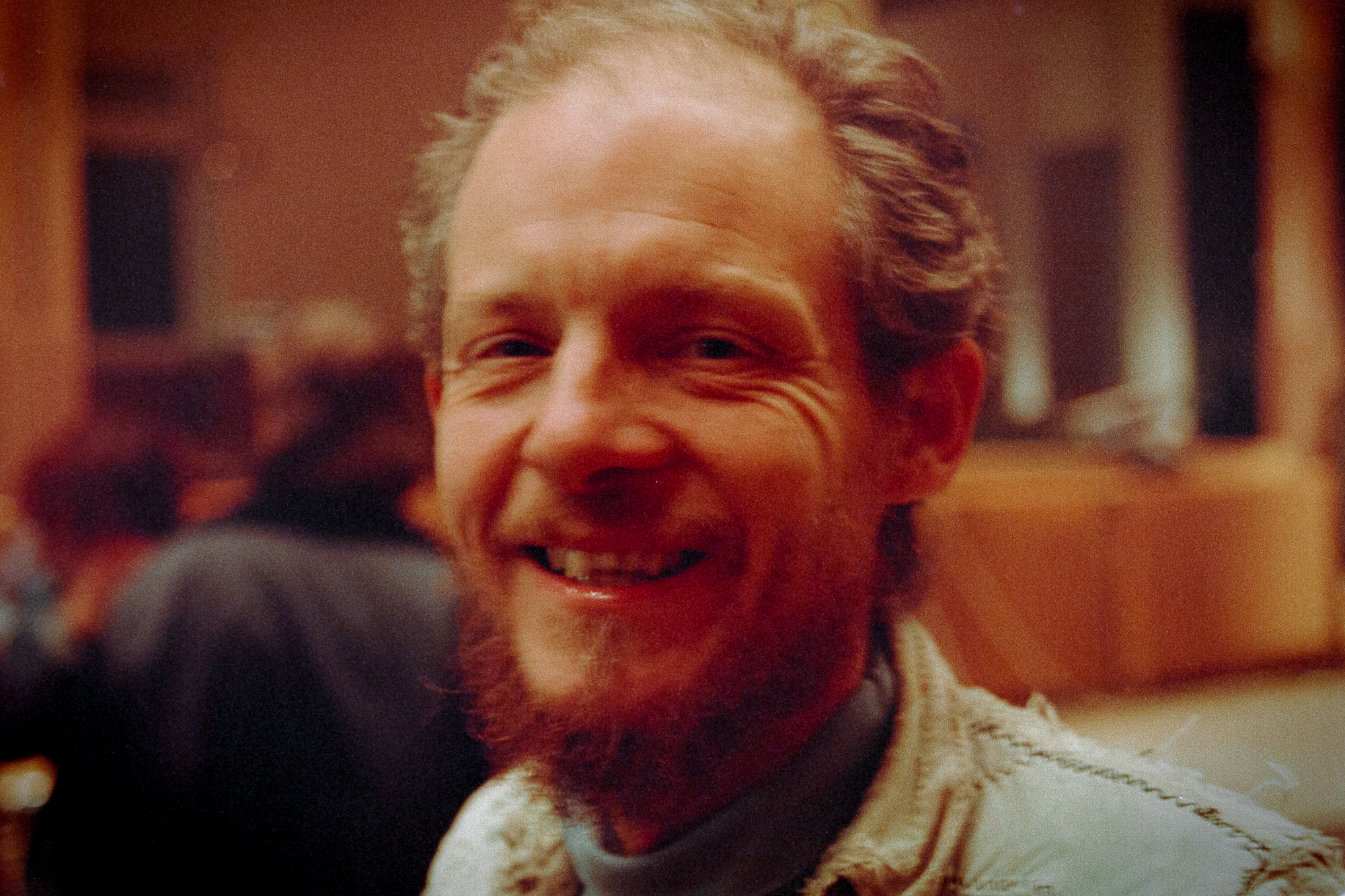
David C Johnson at the 1989 presentation of "Gefangene Früchte" for the first MultiMediale festival organized by the Zentrum for Künst und MedienTechnologie, Karlsruhe

In 1966–1967, he was an independent collaborator at the Electronic Studio of the WDR, where he assisted Karlheinz Stockhausen with the production of his electronic work Hymnen. He also operated the live-electronics in the first performances of the chamber-orchestra version of Stockhausen's Mixtur (1967), and in the Darmstadt collaborative works directed by Stockhausen, Ensemble in 1967 and Musik für ein Haus in 1968.

In 1968, Johnson was instructor of electronic music at the Cologne Courses for New Music. From its formation in Cologne in 1968, he collaborated with the experimental beat group, later known as Can, formed by bass guitarist Holger Schüring (later known as Holger Czukay), keyboardist Irmin Schmidt, guitarist Michael Karoli and drummer Jaki Liebezeit. He left in 1969, disappointed at their growing rock influences and, according to Irmin, the lack of patience for band's vocalist, Malcolm Mooney, "with his craziness and spontaneity and totally unforeseen sudden outbursts". Johnson also added that the group "demanded too much unstrained dedication, which cannot be mustered up artificially."

In 1970, Johnson performed in a number of Stockhausen's "process" works (Spiral, Pole, Expo) at the German pavilion of Expo '70, the Osaka world's fair. After Osaka Johnson, together with Johannes Fritsch and Rolf Gehlhaar, founded the Feedback Studio in Cologne and became a technical collaborator in the Studio for Electronic Music of Utrecht University.

In the early 1970s, Johnson joined the Oeldorf Group, a musicians' cooperative, with Péter Eötvös, Mesías Maiguashca, Gaby Schumacher (cello) and Joachim Krist (viola), who organized a Summer Night Music series. Performances were held in the barn attached to the group's farmhouse in Oeldorf, near Kürten.

In 1972, with Helmut Lachenmann, he coordinated the Composition Studio at the Darmstadt International Summer Courses for New Music. He remained technical director of the Feedback Studio until 1975, when he moved to Basel to become director of the electronic studio of the City of Basel Music Academy there, a post he held until 1985.

In the mid-eighties he played flute on Irmin Schmidt's soundtrack for Rote Erde TV series.

Johnson died in Basel on October 28, 2021, aged 81.

== Personal life ==
David C. Johnson and Mary Bauermeister (at the time married to Karlheinz Stockhausen) had a daughter Sofie (born July 1972).

== Discography ==
- Three Pieces for string quartet (1966)
- Dort wo wir leben, electronic music for the documentary film by Kazimierz Karabasz (1967)
- TeleFun, electronic music (1968)
- Ton-Antiton, electronic music (1968)
- Prorganica, sound installation (1970)
- Organica I–IV, sound installations (1970–72)
- Triangles, for flute, clarinet, cello, and 3 ring modulators (1975)
- Ars Subtilior Electrica, electronic music, realised in the Electronic Studio of the Musikakademie Basel (1977)
- Drop Fruit, for tape, live-electronics, slides and accompanying events (1984)
- Of burning a candle, for tape and slides (1985)
- Imprisoned Fruit, Cybernetic Soundspace (1989/90)
- Earth Wisdom, for tape, live-electronics and slides (1990)

Recorded with Can in 1968:

- Agilok & Blubbo (2009)
- Kamasutra: Vollendung der Liebe (2009)
- The Lost Tapes (2012)
