= Vinko Globokar =

French-Slovenian avant-garde composer and trombonist (born 1934)

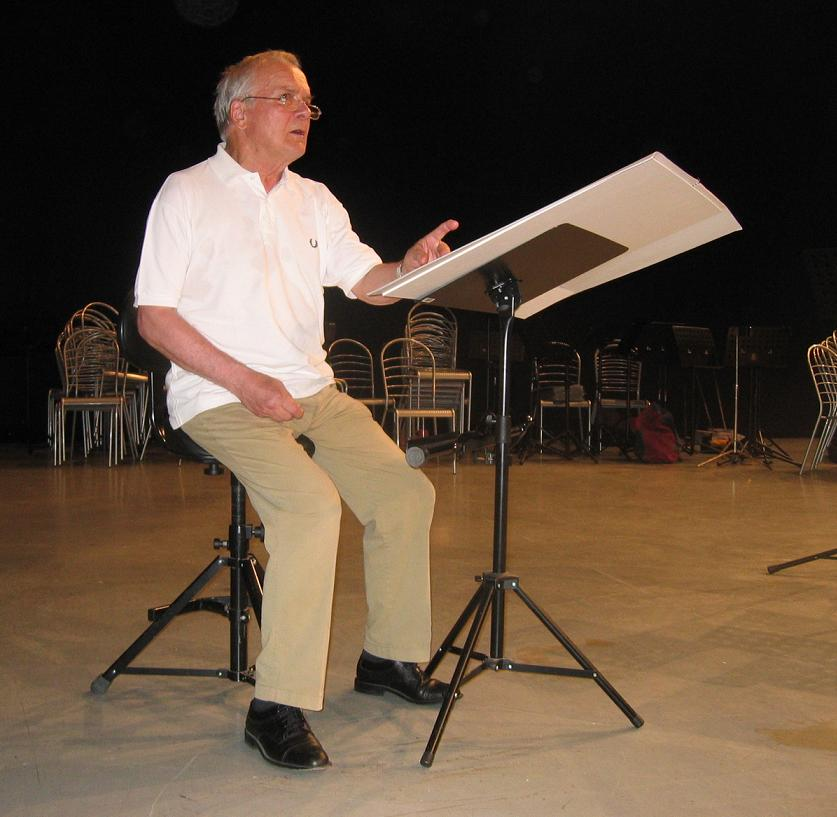
Vinko Globokar in 2006

Vinko Globokar (born 7 July 1934) is a French-Slovenian avant-garde composer and trombonist.

Globokar's music uses unconventional and extended techniques, places great emphasis on spontaneity and creativity, and often relies on improvisation. His extensive output is largely unknown outside of experimental music circles.

As a trombonist, he has premiered works by Luciano Berio, Mauricio Kagel, René Leibowitz, Karlheinz Stockhausen, and Toru Takemitsu, as well as his own compositions.

== Biography ==
Globokar was born in Anderny, Meurthe-et-Moselle, France. In 1947 he moved to Yugoslavia, where he attended DIC in Ljubljana, Slovenia. Here, he played jazz trombone until 1955, at which point he moved to Paris to study at the Conservatoire de Paris. At the Conservatoire, he studied composition with René Leibowitz (a disciple of Arnold Schoenberg) and trombone with André Lafosse. In 1965, he moved to Berlin and began composition lessons with Luciano Berio, whose Sequenza V he later premiered at Carnegie Recital Hall in 1966.

In the later 1960s he worked with Karlheinz Stockhausen on some of his compositions from the cycle Aus den sieben Tagen, and co-founded the free improvisation group New Phonic Art. From 1967 to 1976 he taught composition at the Musikhochschule in Cologne, where his students included Clarence Barlow. In 1974, he joined IRCAM as the director of instrumental and vocal research, a job which he occupied until 1980.

He has conducted his compositions with Finnish Radio Symphony Orchestra, Orchestre philharmonique de Radio France, Jerusalem Symphony Orchestra, RTV Slovenia Symphony Orchestra, Warsaw National Philharmonic Orchestra, and Westdeutscher Rundfunk. From 1983 until 1999, he directed 20th-century music with the Orchestra Giovanile Italiana in Florence.

In 2002, Globokar was bestowed with the Prešeren Award for lifetime achievement.

== Musical style ==
Globokar's music is notable for its spontaneity, energy, and innovative use of unorthodox instrumental and compositional techniques. His works often feature indeterminacy and improvisation, reflecting his own background in jazz and free improvisation. His pieces employ a variety of extended techniques. For example, in his solo percussion piece Toucher, the performer narrates a story while simultaneously playing the syllabic patterns on a percussion array.

== Works (selection) ==
=== Stage works ===
- L’idôle (2012) Music theatre for girls’ choir and four percussionists. Text: Georges Lewkowicz
- L‘armonia drammatica (1987–1990) Music drama for orchestra, mixed choir, 7 singers and tenor saxophone. Text: Edoardo Sanguineti
- Les Émigrés (1982–85) Triptych

* Miserere (1982) for five narrators, Jazz trio and orchestra
* Réalités / Augenblicke (1984) for five singers, tape, film and slides
* Sternbild der Grenze (1985) for five singers, mezzo soprano, baritone and 18 musicians

=== Orchestra works ===
- Radiographie d’un roman (2009/10) for mixed choir (and seven soloists), accordion solo, percussion solo, 30 instrumentalists and live-electronic. Text: Vinko Globokar
- Mutation for a singing orchestra. Text: Michael Gielen
- Der Engel der Geschichte

* Part 1: Zerfall (2000) for two orchestral groups and tape playback
* Part 2: Mars (2001/02) for two orchestral groups, tape and live-electronic
* Part 3: Hoffnung (2003/2004) for two orchestral groups and sampler

- Les otages (2003) for orchestra and sampler
- Les chemins de la liberté (2003/05) for orchestra without conductor
- Anti-zapping (2003/05) for orchestra
- Masse Macht und Individuum (1995) for orchestra and four soloists
- Labour (1992) for large orchestra
- Eisenberg (1990) Orchestra version

=== Ensemble works and vocal music ===
- Kaleidoskop im Nebel (2012/13) for chamber ensemble
- L’Exil N° 1 (2012) for soprano (or tenor) and five instrumentalists. Text montage in seven languages by Vinko Globokar
- L‘Éxil N° 2 (2012) for soprano (or tenor) and 13 instrumentalists. Text montage in seven languages by Vinko Globokar
- Eppure si muove (2003) for conducting trombonist and eleven instrumentalists
- La Prison (2001) for eight instruments

=== Chamber music ===
- Avgustin, dober je vin (2002) for wind quintet
- Terres brûlées, ensuite... (1998) for saxophone, piano and percussion (written for Trio Accanto)
- Discours IX (1993) for two pianos
- Élégie balkanique (1992) for flute, guitar and percussion
- Discours V (1981) for saxophone quartet
- Discours VIII (1990) for wind quintet
- Discours VII (1986) for brass quintet
- Plan (1965) for flute, clarinet, oboe, trombone, and percussion

=== Solo works ===
- NOTES (1972) for solo piano
- Voix Instrumentalisée (1973) for bass clarinet
- Toucher (1973) for percussion
- ?Corporel (1985) for percussion
- Oblak Semen (1996) for trombone
- Dialog über Wasser (1994) for acoustic and electric guitar
- Dialog über Luft (1994) for accordion
- Dialog über Erde (1994) for percussion
- Dialog über Feuer (1994) for double bass
