= ArtAbilitation =

International conference for disabled people

ArtAbilitation is an international conference platform for people with disabilities and a movement that started in 2006 as coined/originated by Anthony (a.k.a. Tony) Brooks. The concept was realized as an international conference, workshop series, and symposium, and was inaugurated in Esbjerg, Denmark, in September 2006 when supporting the ICDVRAT in celebrating its tenth anniversary. Selected authors from this inaugural event published their papers in the Routledge International Journal Digital Creativity. The events of ICDVRAT & ArtAbilitation 2006 were reported in the International Journal for Virtual Reality.

In 2007, the second ArtAbilitation conference supported the 17th International Conference for Artificial Reality & Telexistence (ICAT). ICAT is the oldest international conference on Virtual Reality and the hosting in Esbjerg, Denmark. This was the first time the event was held outside the Asia Pacific region. ICAT is organised by the Virtual Reality Society of Japan (VRSJ). ICAT 2006 was held at Zhejiang University of Technology in China. Archives of ICAT2007 are online at IEEE site. The first international symposium ‘Ludic Engagement Designs for All’ supported.

The 3rd ArtAbilitation Conference was held alongside ICDVRAT 2008 in Maia, Portugal, on September 8 through 10th. A special session on music was hosted at Casa da Musica, Porto, Portugal, on 11 September. This was followed by the 2nd International Congress on Art, Brain and Languages, hosted in Casa da Musica in Porto on 11 and 12 September. The conference combines various areas of knowledge such as Neuropsychology, Musical Sciences, Theatrical Arts, Art Therapy, and Linguistics. It aims for a holistic, interdisciplinary approach to education, disability, and rehabilitation. It intends to question how the inter-related practice and processing of different types of language (musical, psychomotor, verbal, technological, and aesthetic) can intervene in education and disability (motor, verbal or mental).

ArtAbilitation 2010 was held in Chile and focused on Human Performance via Digital Technologies.

ArtAbilitation 2011 was held in Esbjerg, Denmark, alongside the inaugural GameAbilitation conference. This is the last ArtAbilitation conference mentioned on the official website.
