= Rolf Gehlhaar =

American composer (1943–2019)

Rolf Rainer Gehlhaar (30 December 1943 – 7 July 2019) was an American composer, Professor in Experimental Music at Coventry University and researcher in assistive technology for music.

== Life ==
Born in Breslau, Gehlhaar was the son of a German rocket scientist, who emigrated to the United States in 1953 to work at a rocket-development research centre in New Mexico. Although he took an interest in music from the age of eight or younger, in the post-war years the family could not afford for him to learn an instrument, and so Rolf only began to play the piano at the age of fifteen, and at about the same time began to compose for fun. He took American citizenship in 1958 and studied at Yale University and the University of California, Berkeley. Initially, he had studied medicine, but soon changed his major to philosophy and the philosophy of science; then at Yale he attended a course in composition, which was an arousing experience. He moved to Cologne, Germany, in 1967 to become assistant to Karlheinz Stockhausen, and became a member of his performing ensemble. In 1969, together with Johannes Fritsch and David C. Johnson, he founded the Feedback Studio, Cologne, a new-music performance center and publishing house. He later moved to England, where he became in 1979 a founding member of the Electro-Acoustic Music Association of Great Britain. In 2002 he Became Senior Lecturer in Design and Digital Media at Coventry University; at the time of his death he was Professor in Experimental Music at Coventry University, School of Art & Design. He also was a founding member of the British Paraorchestra and its technical director.

His works are for both acoustic and electro-acoustic media, though he is best known for his work with computer-controlled composition, and for his interactive installations such as Sound=Space (1985), HeadSpace (2000), CaDaReMi (2006), Walking on Earth (2007), and has for many years collaborated with Luis Miguel Girao of Artshare, Aveiro, Portugal.

He died in London on 7 July 2019.

== Compositions ==
- "Beckenstück" for 6 amplified cymbals (1969)
- "Klavierstück 2-2 for 2 pianos (1970)
- "Phase" for orchestra and time delay (1972)
- "Musi-ken" for string quartet (1972)
- "Liebeslied" for orchestra and alto (1974)
- Solipse for cello and tape delay (1974)
- Five German Dances for 4-track tape (1975)
- Resonanzen for 8 orchestral groups (1976)
- "Lamina"! for orchestra and trombone (1977)
- Polymorph for bass clarinet and tape delay (1978)
- "Linear A" for marimbaphone (and bass marimba) (1978)
- "Strangeness, Charm and Colour" for piano, 2 Tp and Tbne (1978)
- "Fluid" for clarinet, violin, cello and piano (1980)
- Sub Rosa for 4-track tape (1980)
- "Step by Step...music for ears in motion" real-time computer generated 3-dimensional sounds with 4 instruments, (IRCAM 1981)
- "Tokamak" for orchestra and piano (1982)
- "Naiiri" for amplified violin (or electric violin or viola) (1983)
- "SOUND=SPACE" interactive computer controlled musical environment (1985)
- Diagonal Flying for piano and live electronics (1989)
- "Chronik" for 2 pianos, 2 percussionists & electronics (1991)
- Cusps, Swallowtails, and Butterflies for amplified percussion and tape in a Sound=Space (1992)
- "Grand Unified Theory of Everything" for alto/bass flute, alto/bass clarinet and piano (1992)
- Quantum Leap for piano (1994)
- "Sonnet for mixed" choir (8-8-8-8) (1996)
- Astral Shadows for 6 dancers in a Sound=Space (1997)
- "Divine Wind" for saxophone quartet (S,A,T,Bar.) (1997)
- Waiting for Rain for soprano, flute, violin, viola da gamba and 2 harpsichords (1998)
- "Cybersong" for tenor and wearable electronics (2003)
- "MULTIVERSE" for a camera-based performance system (2006)
- "VIAGEM" for an orchestra of disabled musicians, a Casa da Música project (2010)
- "SONG" for alto saxophone (2012)

== Publications ==
- Gehlhaar, R., Girao, L. M., Rodrigues, P., Penha, R. "Instrument for Everyone: Designing New Means of Musical Expression for Disabled Creators", Casa da Música, Porto; DRHA 2010 Conference Proceedings, Brunel University 2010
- Gehlhaar, R., Girao, L. M., Rodrigues, P. M., "CaDaReMi, an Educational Game", ICDVRAT Intl Journal for Disability and Human Development 2010.
- Almeida, A. P., Girao, L. M., Gehlhaar, R. Rodrigues, P. and Rodrigues, H. "SOUND=SPACE: Music Perception in Action". In Proceedings of 5th International Conference on Multimedia and Information and Communication Technologies in Education (Porto, April 2009), Formatex, 1199–1203.
- Gehlhaar, R., Girao, L. M., Rodrigues, P. M., Almeida, A. P., 2008. "Musical Topologies in Sound=Space". In 28th ISME World Conference. Bologna, Italy, (CD-ROM / ISBN 9780980456028)
- Almeida, A. P., Girao, L. M., Gehlhaar, R. and Rodrigues, P. "SOUND=SPACE Update at Casa da Musica". In Proceedings of 2nd European Conference on Development Psychology of Music Perception (Roehampton, September 2008), Roehampton University, 80–84.
- Almeida, A. P., Girao, L. M., Gehlhaar, R. Rodrigues, P., Neto, P. and Monica M. "SOUND=SPACE OPERA". in Proceedings of 7th International Conference on Disability Virtual Reality and Associated Technologies with ArtAbilitation (Maia, September 2008), ICDVRAT/University of Reading, 347–354.
- Gehlhaar, R., Rodrigues, P., Girao, L, "Cybersong Nime'05, May 26–28, 2005". Vancouver, British Columbia, Canada.

== Exhibitions and performances ==
- SONG for alto Saxophone, Aveiro, Portugal 2012
- VIAGEM, orchestral composition for 80 disabled musicians, premiered April 2010 at Casa da Musica, Porto, Portugal
