= Mittwoch aus Licht =

Opera by Karlheinz Stockhausen

- Opera by Karlheinz Stockhausen
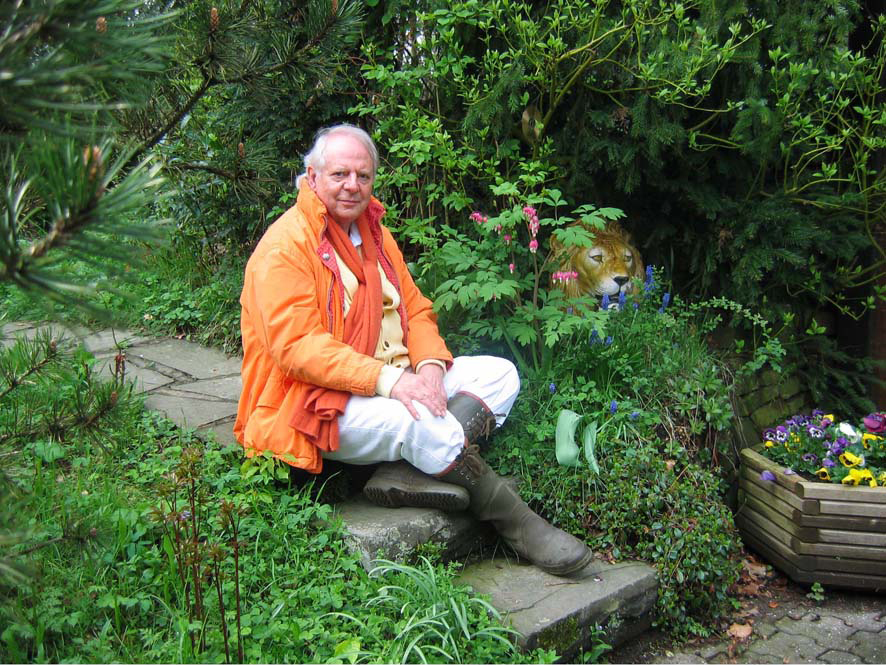
- Stockhausen in his garden in Kürten on Wednesday, 20 April 2005
- Librettist: Stockhausen
- Language: German
- Premiere: 22 August 2012; Birmingham Opera Company

Mittwoch aus Licht (English: Wednesday from Light) is an opera by Karlheinz Stockhausen in a greeting, four scenes, and a farewell. It was the sixth of seven to be composed for the opera cycle Licht: die sieben Tage der Woche (Light: The Seven Days of the Week), and the last to be staged. It was written between 1995 and 1997, and first staged in 2012.

== History ==
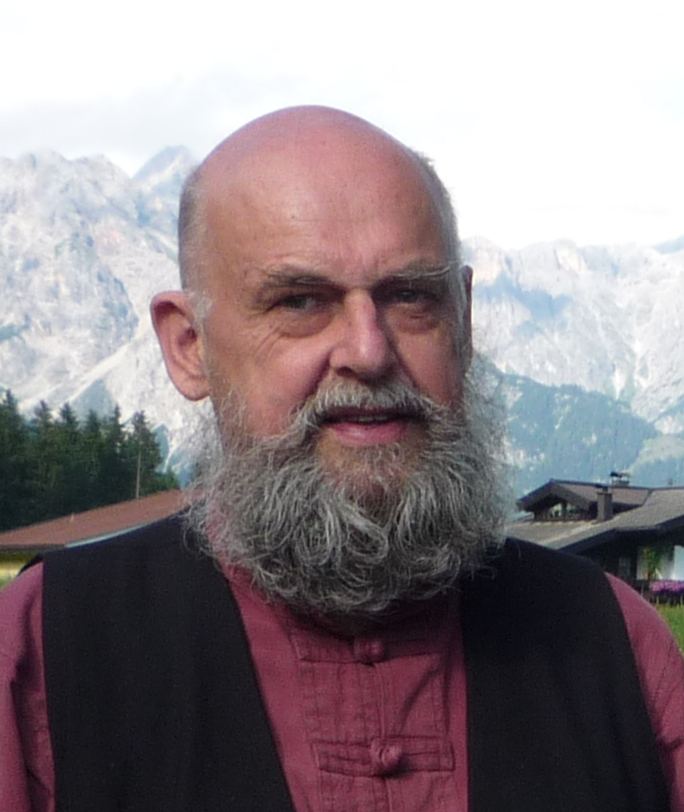
Rupert Huber, conductor of the premieres of Welt-Parlament and Michaelion in 1996 and 1998, respectively

The four component scenes were separately commissioned and premiered:

- Welt-Parlament (World Parliament) was commissioned by the South German Radio Stuttgart and was composed from 29 December 1994 to 5 March 1995. It received its premiere on 3 February 1996, at the Hegelsaal of the Liederhalle in Stuttgart, sung by the Choir of the South German Radio, conducted by Rupert Huber, with sound projection by Karlheinz Stockhausen.
- Orchester-Finalisten (Orchestra Finalists) was commissioned by Jan van Vlijmen, director of the Holland Festival, and was premiered on 14 June 1996, at the Carré Theatre, Amsterdam, by the Asko Ensemble.
- Helikopter-Streichquartett (Helicopter String Quartet) was premiered by the Arditti Quartet and the Grasshoppers on 26 June 1995 in Amsterdam, as part of the Holland Festival. Performed "fairly regularly" since its premiere, it has become "the most iconic piece of classical music from the 1990s".
- Michaelion was composed in 1997 on a commission from Udo Zimmermann for the musica viva concert series of the Bavarian Radio, Munich. The score is dedicated to the Archangel Michael. It was premiered on 26 July 1998 in the Prinzregententheater, Munich (musica viva series) by the Choir of the South German Radio, conducted by Rupert Huber, with Kathinka Pasveer (flute), Michael Vetter (bass with short-wave receiver), Andreas Fischer (bass), Suzanne Stephens (basset horn), Marco Blaauw (trumpet), Andrew Digby (trombone), Antonio Pérez Abellán (synthesizer), and Natascha Nikeprelevic (camel assistant).

The staged premiere of Mittwoch was given by the Birmingham Opera Company on what would have been the composer's 84th birthday, Wednesday 22 August 2012 at the Argyle Works, a former factory in Digbeth, Birmingham, as part of the London 2012 Festival, with further performances on 23, 24, and 25 August. The director was Graham Vick, music director Kathinka Pasveer, designer Paul Brown, lighting Giuseppe di Iorio, and choreography Ron Howell. The production went on to win the 2012 Royal Philharmonic Society Award for Opera and Music Theatre.

The second full staging of the work took place at the Deutsche Oper Berlin in September 2026.

== Roles (staged premiere) ==
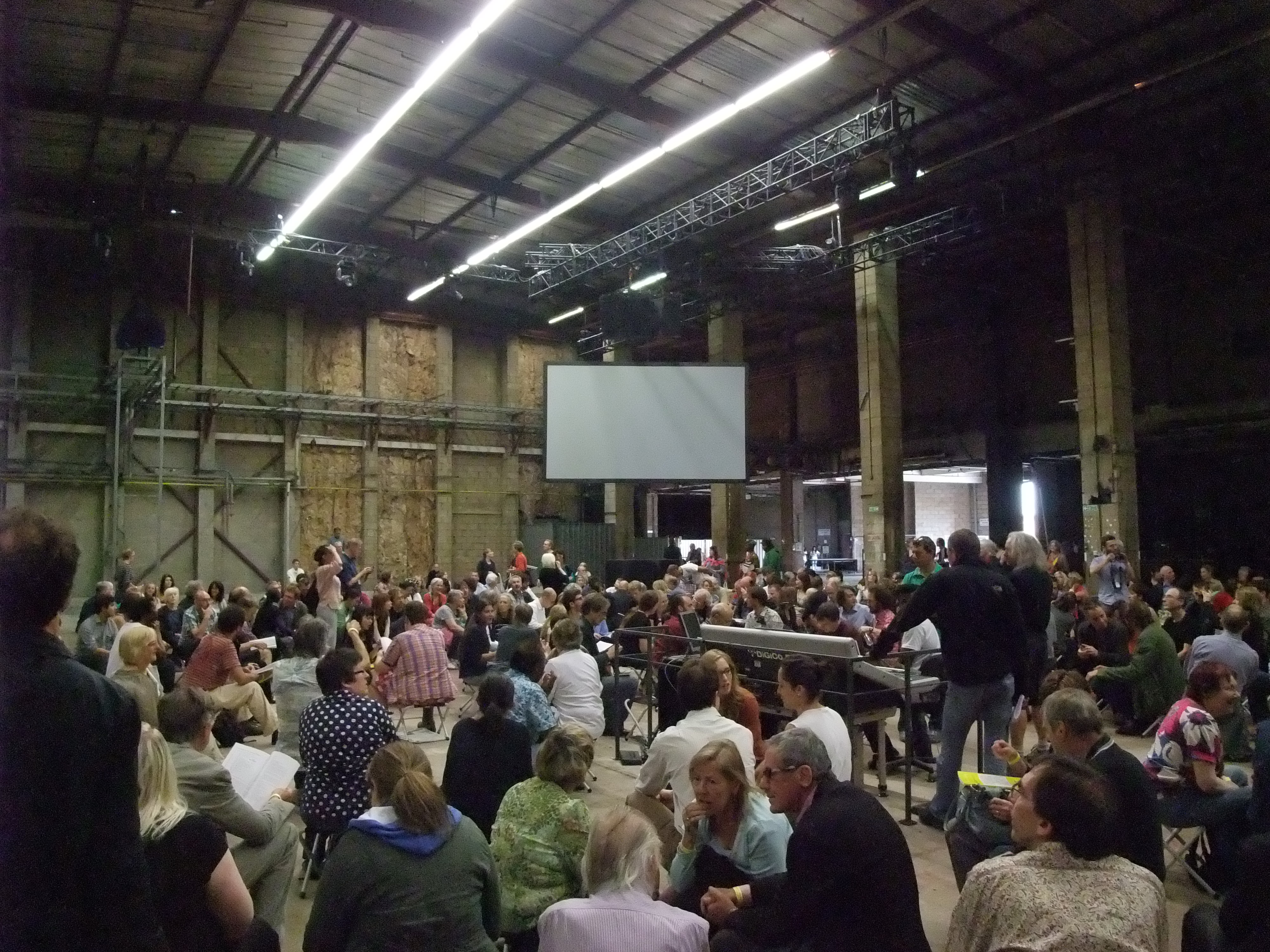
Interior of the Argyle Works, shortly before the dress rehearsal of Mitwoch on 21 August 2012

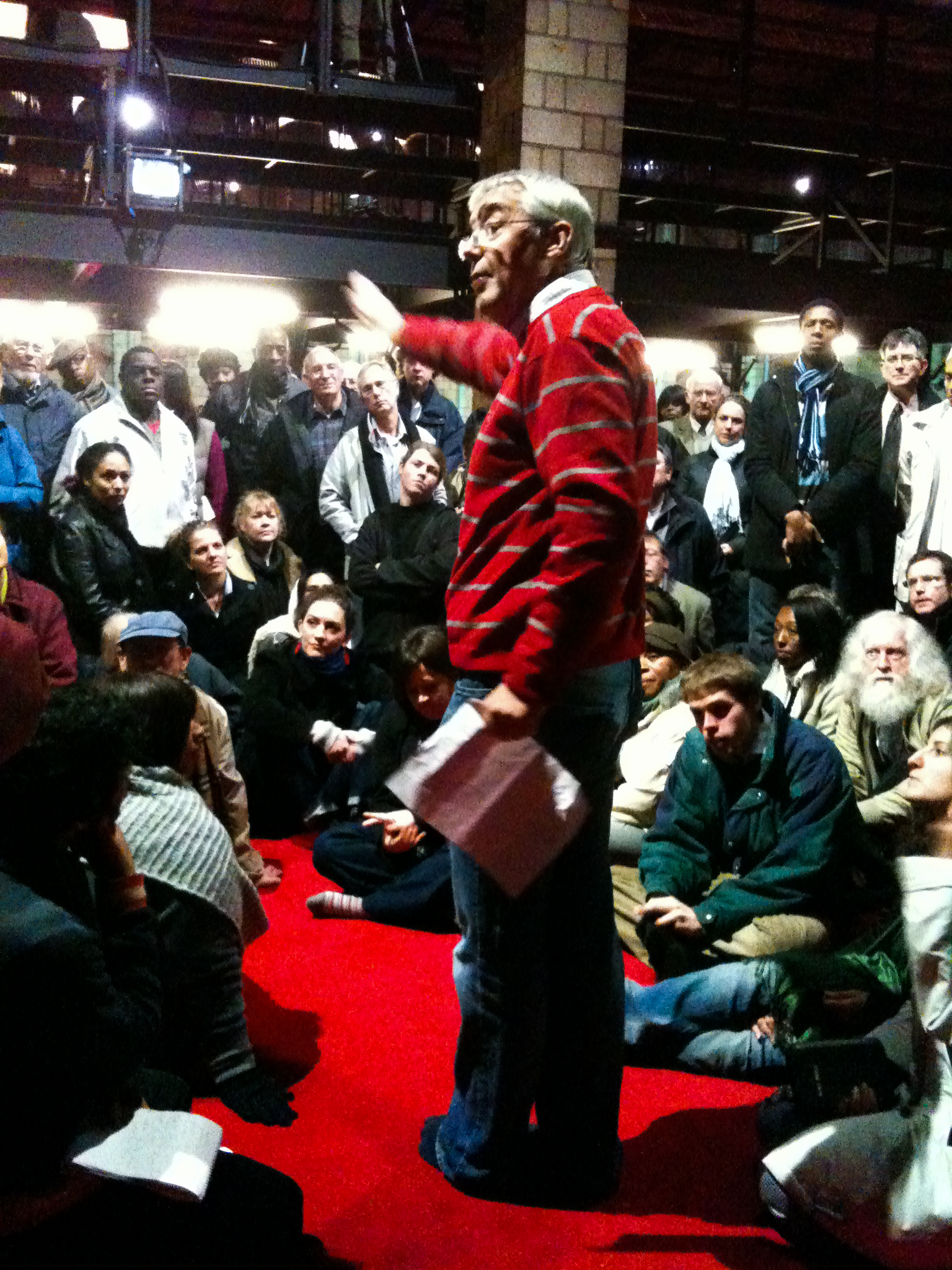
Director Graham Vick

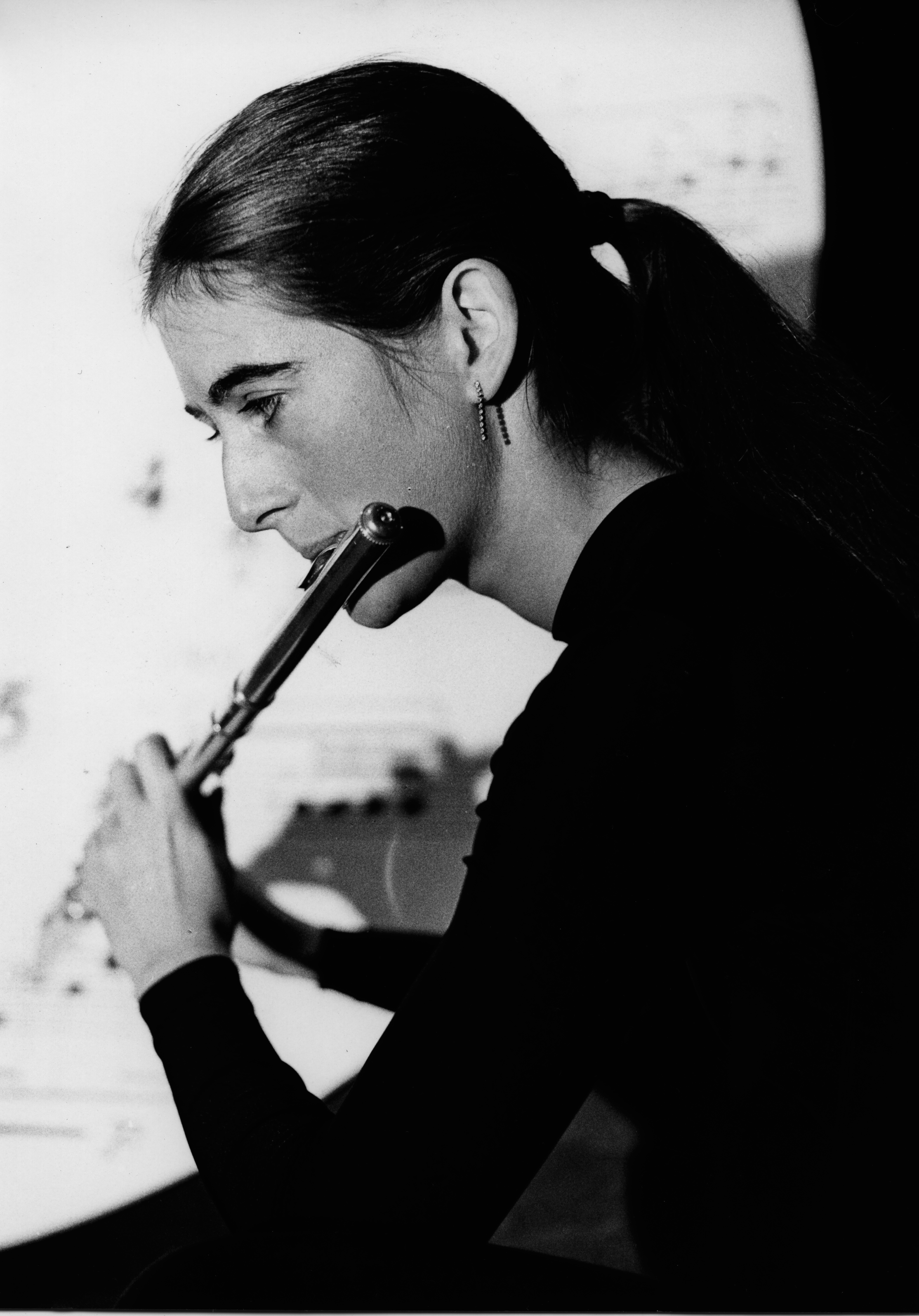
Music director Kathinka Pasveer

Roles, voice types/performer, premiere cast
| Role | Performer | Premiere cast, August 2012 |
World Parliament
| The Representatives | chorus | Ex Cathedra, Jeffrey Skidmore (chorus master) |
| President | tenor | Ben Thapa |
| Substitute President/Coloratura Eve | soprano | Elizabeth Drury |
| Janitor | actor | Khalid Butt |
| | sound projection | Kathinka Pasveer |
Orchestra Finalists
| Oboist | oboe | Dan Bates |
| Cellist | cello | Jonathan Rees |
| Clarinetist | clarinet | Vicky Wright |
| Bassoonist | bassoon | Amy Harman |
| Violinist | violin | Debs White |
| Tubist | tuba | Ian Foster |
| Flutist | flute | Karin de Fleyt |
| Trombonist | trombone | Andrew Connington |
| Violist | viola | Bridget Carey |
| Trumpeter | trumpet | Bruce Nockles |
| Bassist | double bass | Jeremy Watt |
| Hornist | horn | Mark Smith |
| Mummy | percussion | David Waring |
| | actor | Annice Boparai |
| | actor | Julie James |
| | actor | Luke Elliott |
| | actor | Vicki Taylor |
| | actor | Nathan Queeley-Dennis |
| | dancer/actor | Nathan Lafayette |
| | actor | Tanisha Parmer |
| | actor | Harry Sidhu |
| | actor | Beth Dyson |
| | actor | Sara |
| | actor | Sultan DiMaggio Hussain |
| | actor | Thom Udall |
| | actor | Emma O'Brien |
| | actor | Claire Eggison |
| | actor | Leonard Finch |
| | sound projection | Kathinka Pasveer |
Helicopter String Quartet
| First Violinist | violin | Emma Smith (Elysian Quartet) |
| Second Violinist | violin | Jennymay Logan (Elysian Quartet) |
| Violist | viola | Vincent Sipprell (Elysian Quartet) |
| Cellist | cello | Laura Moody (Elysian Quartet) |
| | helicopter pilot | Miles Fletcher |
| | helicopter pilot | Will Samuelson |
| | helicopter pilot | Alistair Badman |
| | helicopter pilot | Nigel Barton |
| | helicopter pilot | Chris Holland (alternate) |
| Moderator | moderator | DJ Nihal |
| | sound projection | Ian Dearden |
Michaelion
| Operator | bass | Michael Leibundgut |
| Lucicamel | actors | Nathan Lafayette, Marie Louise Crawley, Emma Hollick (cover) |
| Flutist | flute | Chloé l'Abbé |
| Basset Hornist | basset horn | Fie Schouten |
| Trumpeter | trumpet | Marco Blaauw |
| Trombonut | trombone | Stephen Menotti |
| Synthesizer | synthesizer | Antonio Pérez Abellán |
| The Delegates | chorus | London Voices, Ben Parry (chorus master) |
| Delegate | actor | Nadia Kemp-Sayfi |
| Delegate | actor | Liam Hall |
| Delegate | actor | Lizzie Hodges |
| Delegate | actor | Jake Dorrell |
| Delegate | actor | Armond Kurti |
| Delegate | actor | Rushaun Cookhorn |
| | sound projection | Kathinka Pasveer |

== Synopsis ==
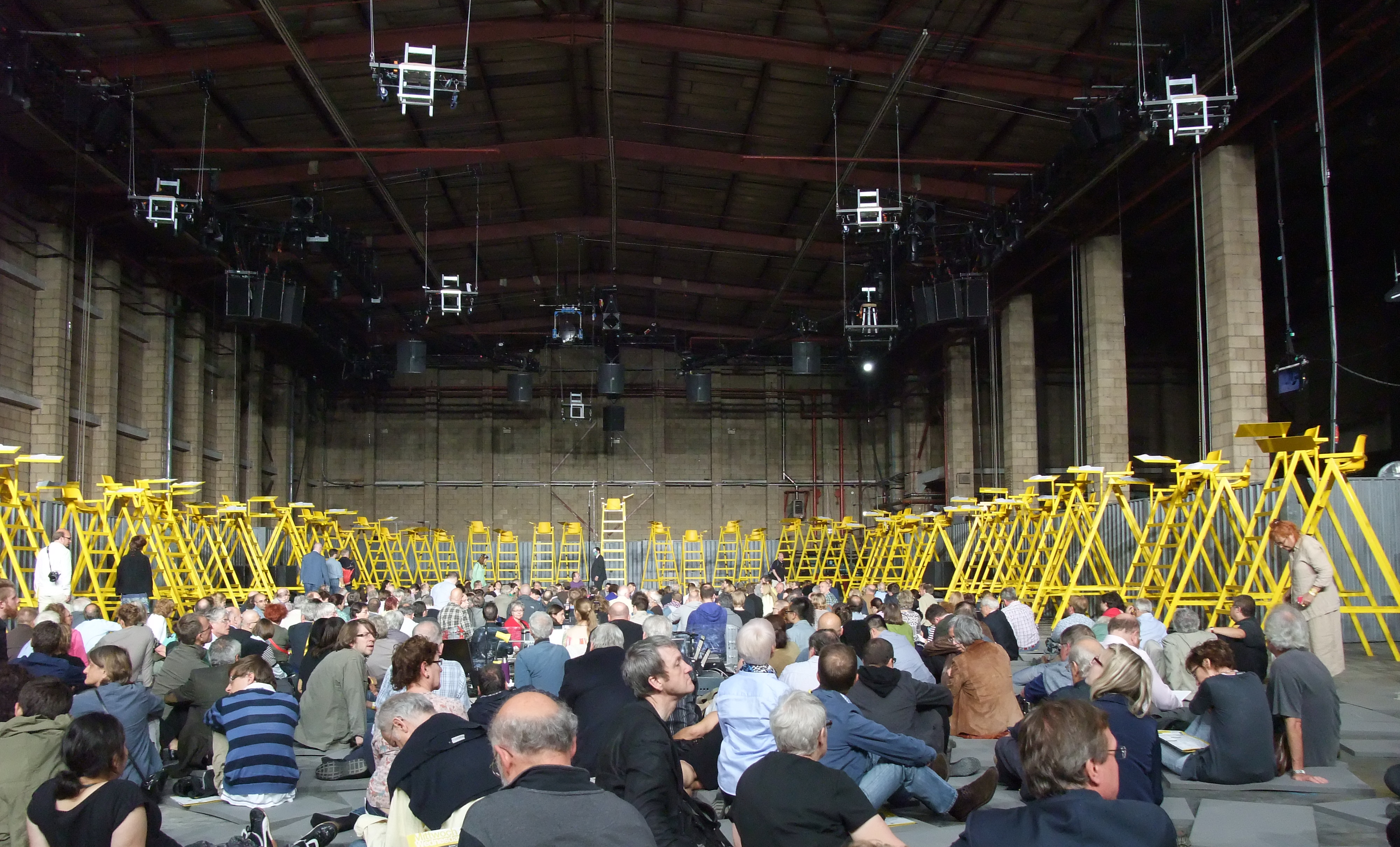
Setting for scene 1, Welt-Parlament, at the world premiere, 22 August 2012

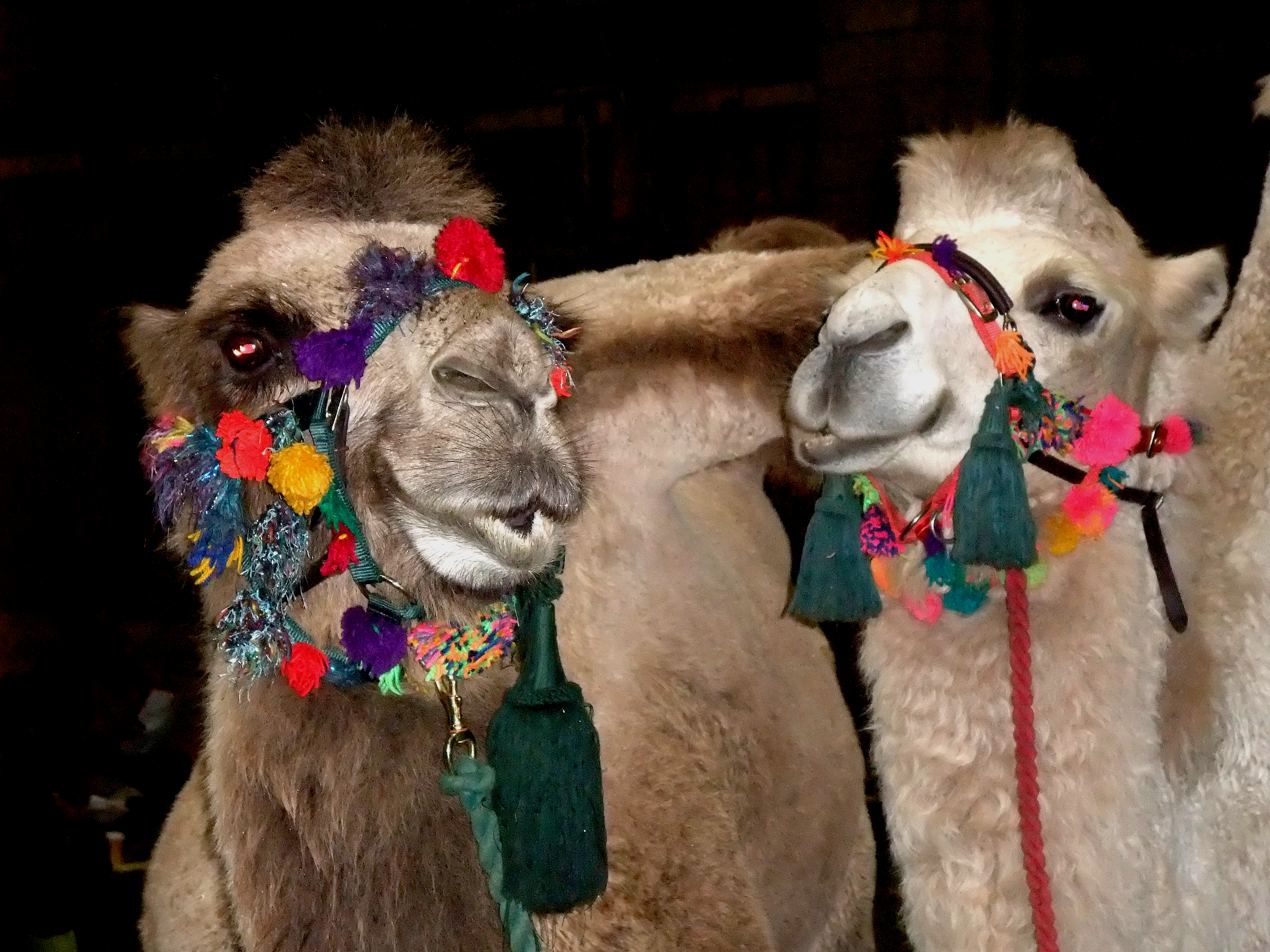
Two bactrian camels during an intermission in the dress rehearsal for Mittwoch (Birmingham Opera, 21 August 2012)

Wednesday is the day of cooperation and reconciliation among Michael, Eve, and Lucifer, and its exoteric colour is bright yellow. The following list of 24 "scenic features" of the whole opera is found in the preface to the score of its final scene:

1. Light spirits: Eve, Michael, and Lucifer
2. Divine principles: intuition and harmony
3. Theme: love, friendship, and cosmic solidarity
4. Ritual: beauty and art
5. Beings: humans and the guardian angel Raphael
6. Element: air
7. Sound: singing
8. Voices: soprano, tenor, and bass
9. Instruments: basset horn with flute, trumpet, trombone
10. Organ: brain, speech organ
11. Sense: sight (especially the right eye), pure reason
12. Centre: between the eyes, face, clairvoyance
13. Awareness: understanding, vision, spiritual comprehension
14. Colour: bright yellow, iridescence of all colours.
15. Scents: mastic and frankincense
16. Precious stones: yellow zircon, topaz
17. Metal: mercury
18. Flower: golden yellow rudbeckia
19. Shrub: forsythia
20. Tree: maple, Japanese maples
21. Animals: dove, camel
22. Number: 8
23. Planet: Mercury
24. Symbol:

Mittwoch is in four scenes, which are preceded by a greeting and followed by a farewell.

=== Mittwochs-Gruß ===
The Wednesday Greeting consists of the electronic music from the fourth scene, Michaelion, and is played in the foyer amidst flutes, winds, blowers, kites, balloons, and flying doves.

=== Scene 1: Welt-Parlament ===
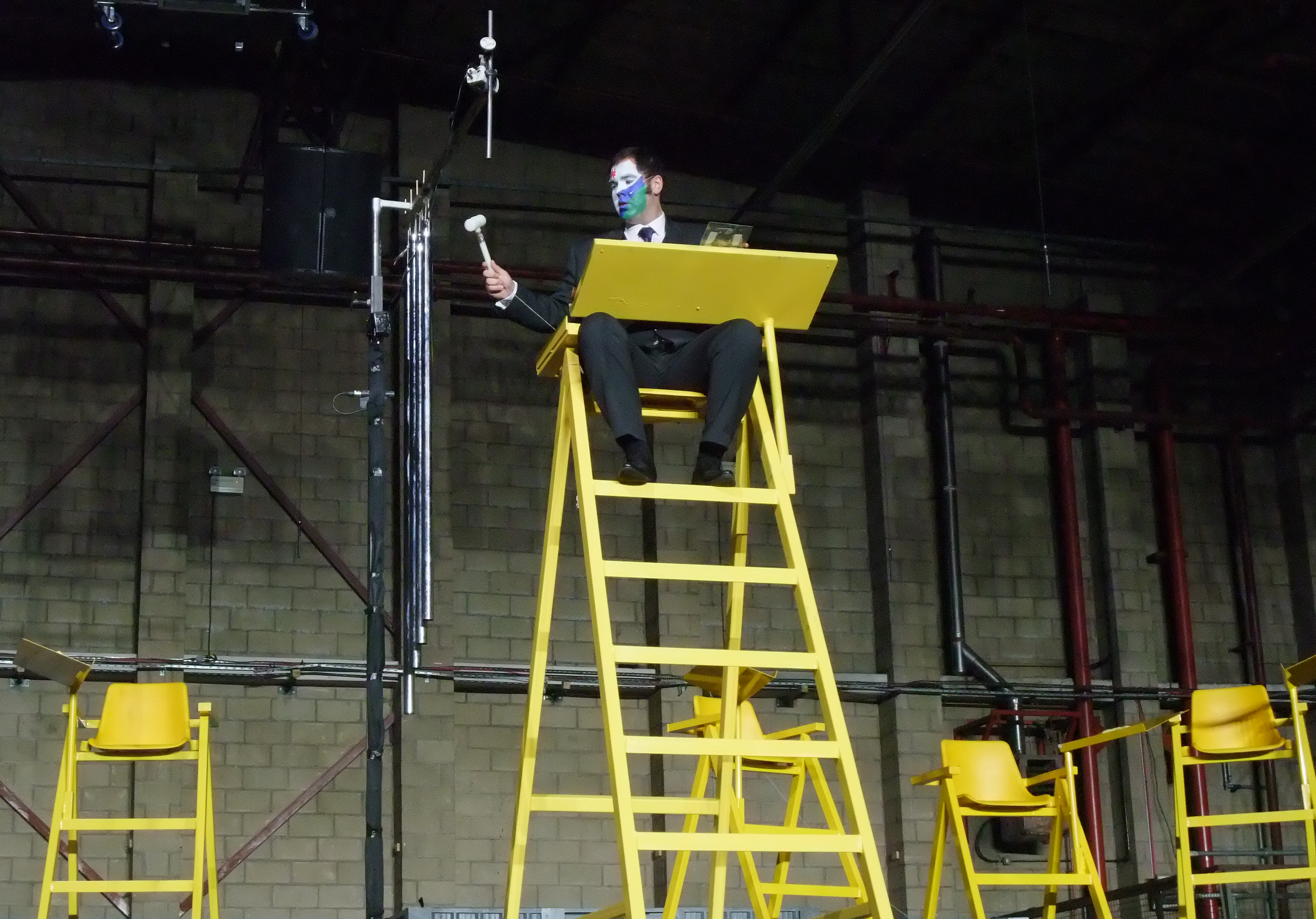
The President (Ben Thapa) convenes the World Parliament (Birmingham Opera production, 24 August 2012)

The World Parliament convenes in a session above the clouds, and the subject for debate is love. As the parliamentarians arrive via transparent elevators at the top floor of the skyscraper or floating glass dome, helicopters and doves occasionally pass by in the blue sky beyond. The debate is carried on in unknown languages, with occasional lapses into intelligibility in the local language. Delegates rise to present their interpretations of love, with the President commenting on each view. When a janitor interrupts with the news that an illegally parked car is about to be towed away, the President realises it is his, and rushes out. A coloratura soprano is elected temporary President, and the debate is continued. After a final large vowel spiral, the parliamentarians synchronously declare the central theme of the opera: "World parliament Wednesday from Light, day of reconciliation, love". The session is adjourned, all rise and exit while singing further attributes of Wednesday ("day of spaces", "day of women's rights", "day of Mercury", "day of reconciliation", "day of flying", "day of new languages", etc.) on a G♭. Unsure where he should exit, the fattest bass stops, turns to the audience in embarrassment, and before leaving stutters, "Now the next scene would follow".

=== Scene 2: Orchester-Finalisten ===
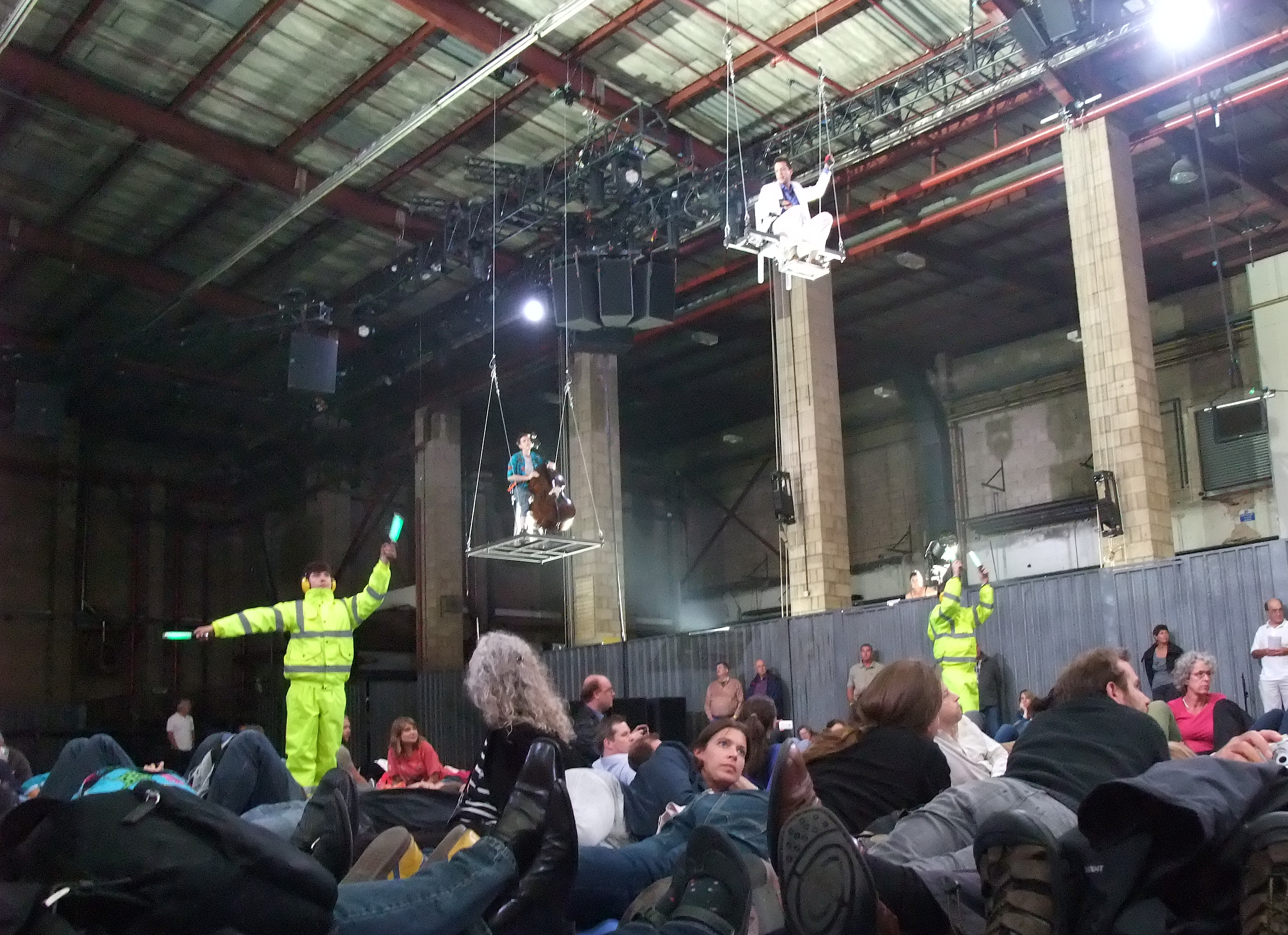
Orchester-Finalisten: during the cello solo, oboe (Dan Bates) and double-bass (Jeremy Watt) above an airport at the sea (Birmingham Opera production, 21 August 2012).

Eleven instrumentalists compete for posts in an orchestra, while floating high in the air. Telescopic observation reveals a variety of airborne scenes: a cathedral roof, aeroplanes flying over the sea, ships in a harbour, etc. In the last solo, the double-bass player becomes convulsed in an obsessive-compulsive fit of scraping and groaning, until the appearance of the mysterious figure of a mummy who, with a stroke on a Chinese gong, releases the bassist from his affliction. After all auditions have been completed, a horn player unexpectedly enters the hall, playing a signal, after which all of the players fly upward in a tutti finale.

The solos are accompanied by electronic and concrete music in octophonic spatial projection, and each is associated with a particular image:

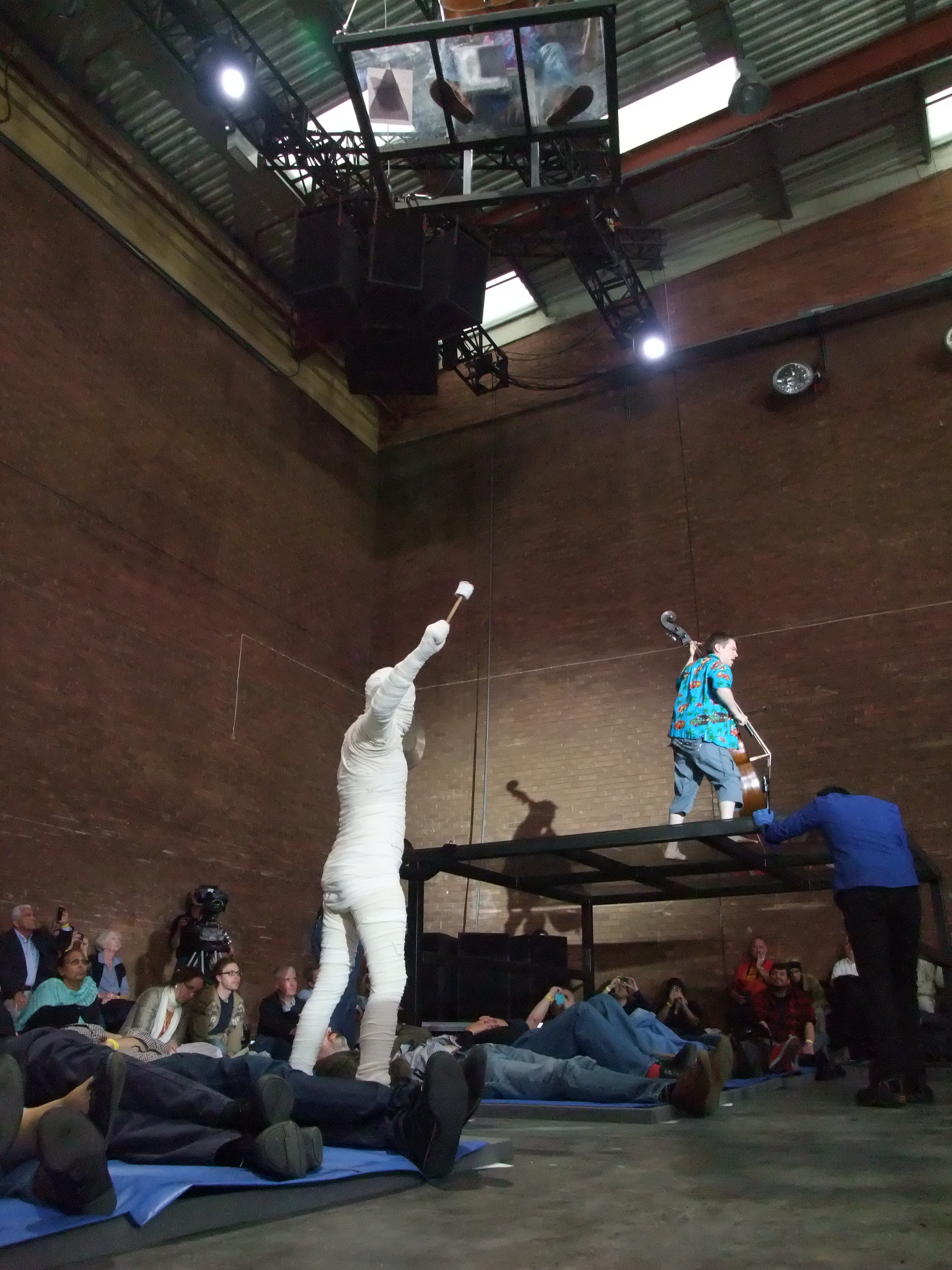
The mummy (David Waring) releases the bassist (Jeremy Watt) from his obsessive-compulsive fit (Birmingham Opera, 23 August 2012)

- Oboe above a cathedral
- Violoncello over an airport by the sea
- Clarinet above a harbour with passing aircraft
- Bassoon over a train pulled by a steam locomotive
- Violin above a bird reserve
- Tuba amongst flocks of birds and swarms of bees
- Flute above a kindergarten with small goats
- Trombone above a swimming pool with elephants
- Viola flying with wild geese over a railway station
- Trumpet over a Marrakesh market-place, with zebras, lions, wild geese, and horses
- Contrabass above a sailing ship, with tree frogs and a beat up car
- Horn
- Orchestral Tutti

=== Scene 3: Helikopter-Streichquartett ===
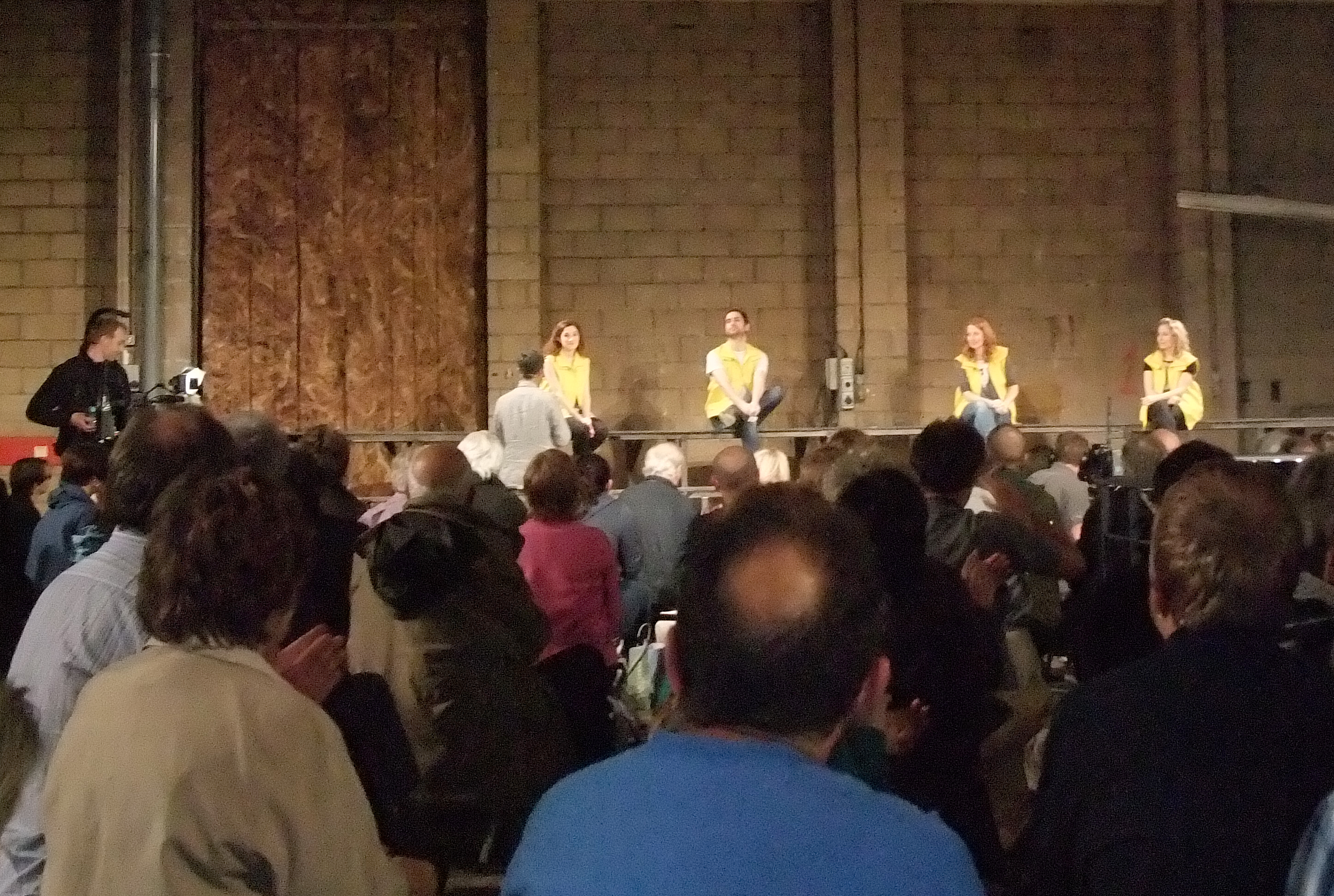
DJ Nihal (back to camera) introduces the Elysian Quartet before they perform the Helicopter String Quartet on 23 August 2012 (Birmingham Opera)

The four musicians of a string quartet are first introduced to the audience by a moderator, who describes the technical details of the performance. The players then walk or are driven to four waiting helicopters, followed by video cameras transmitting back to television monitors in the auditorium.

They are then carried into the air by the helicopters, from where they play a synchronized, polyphonic composition while reacting to the sounds of the rotor blades. Their playing is also influenced by the movements chosen by the pilots. From time to time their playing comes together in the same rhythms and bowings, even though it is plain they are isolated and kilometers apart. Video cameras and microphones transmit their images (including views through the glass cockpits of the world below) and sounds to four towers of video monitors and loudspeakers in the auditorium on the ground.

After returning to the ground and concluding the composition, the musicians and pilots disembark and return to the auditorium, still followed by the video cameras. Once in the auditorium, the moderator introduces the pilots to the audience, and asks players and pilots about their experiences. Questions are also taken from the audience.

=== Scene 4: Michaelion ===
The Michaelion is a galactic headquarters where a meeting of delegates from different stars has been called in order to elect a new President. He or she must be a "galaxy operator" who can translate universal messages no one else can understand. The scene consists of three sub-scenes.

Präsidium
As the delegates arrive, the word goes round that the favourite candidate is named Lucicamel. In the auditorium, someone is listening to a short-wave radio, occasionally mimicking the sounds. After a while, he leaves.

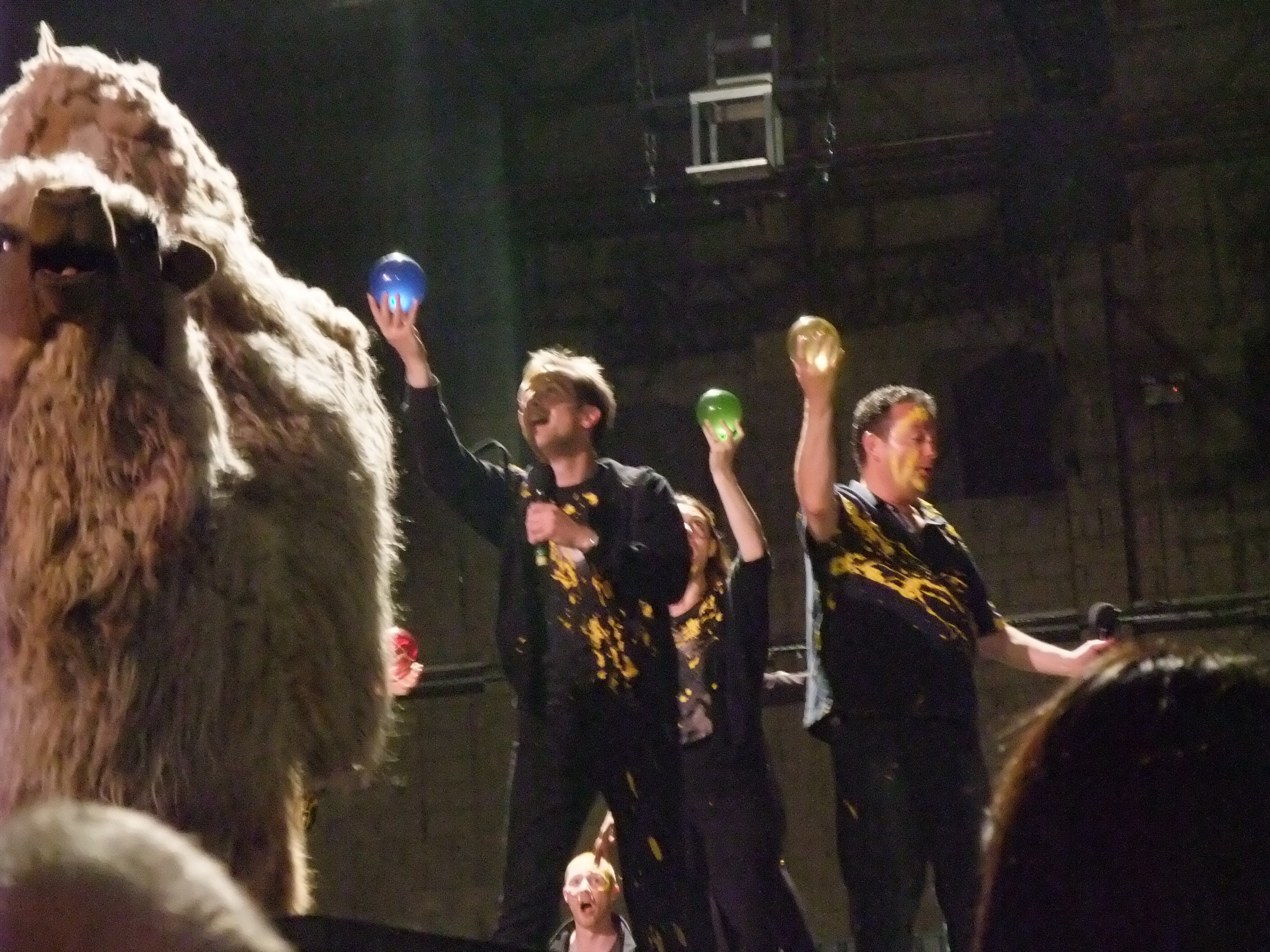
"Kakabel" from Michaelion: choir members hold up the seven globes and comment (Birmingham Opera, 24 August 2012)

Luzikamel
Lucicamel, who is a Bactrian camel, arrives accompanied by a trombonist dressed in white, and is greeted by the delegates. In a series of events, he presents himself to the assembly.

- "Kakabel". Lucicamel sings of Camael, the angel of the seven planets, and defecates seven differently coloured planet globes, "which emphasize MICHAEL'S light for the seven days of the week". Not all of the delegates are favourably impressed.
- "Shoe-Shine Serenade". Two tenors polish Lucicamel's left fore hoof until it shines like gold, while two other tenors do the same with his left hind hoof.
- "Pocket Trick". Lucicamel turns around and abruptly sticks one hoof into his pocket. Two tenor delegates entice him away with a large bottle of champagne and he nearly leaves, but is stopped and brought back by two altos.

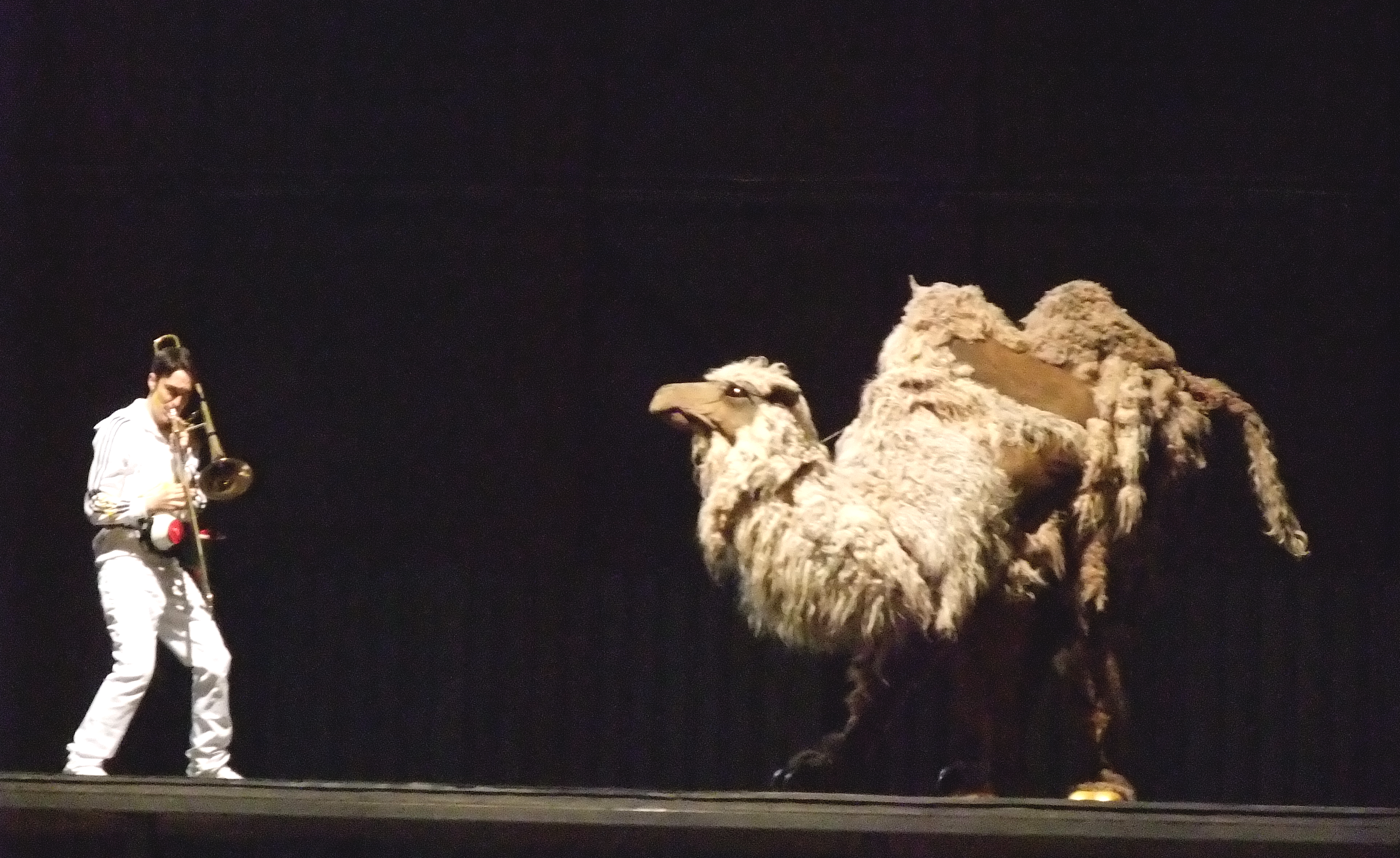
Trombonut (Stephen Menotti) and Lucicamel in the Camel Dance from Michaelion (Birmingham Opera, 24 August 2012)

- "Camel Dance". A little tipsy, Lucicamel and his trombone assistant dance, while he sings the names of stars and sneers at "Sirius philistines who say that Lucicameltrombonut are not musical". The delegates chuckle and make ironic and humorous comments.
- "Bullfight". Trombonut plays the part of a matador and Lucicamel plays the bull, while the delegates clap and cheer them on. Lucicamel wins, and sits down on the fallen trombonist while a podium is brought in and the women unzip the camel costume. From it emerges Luca, wearing a Zen monk's cape. He is brought a yellow robe, mask, and high, pointed hat. He is acclaimed as President and Operator, and takes his place on the podium.

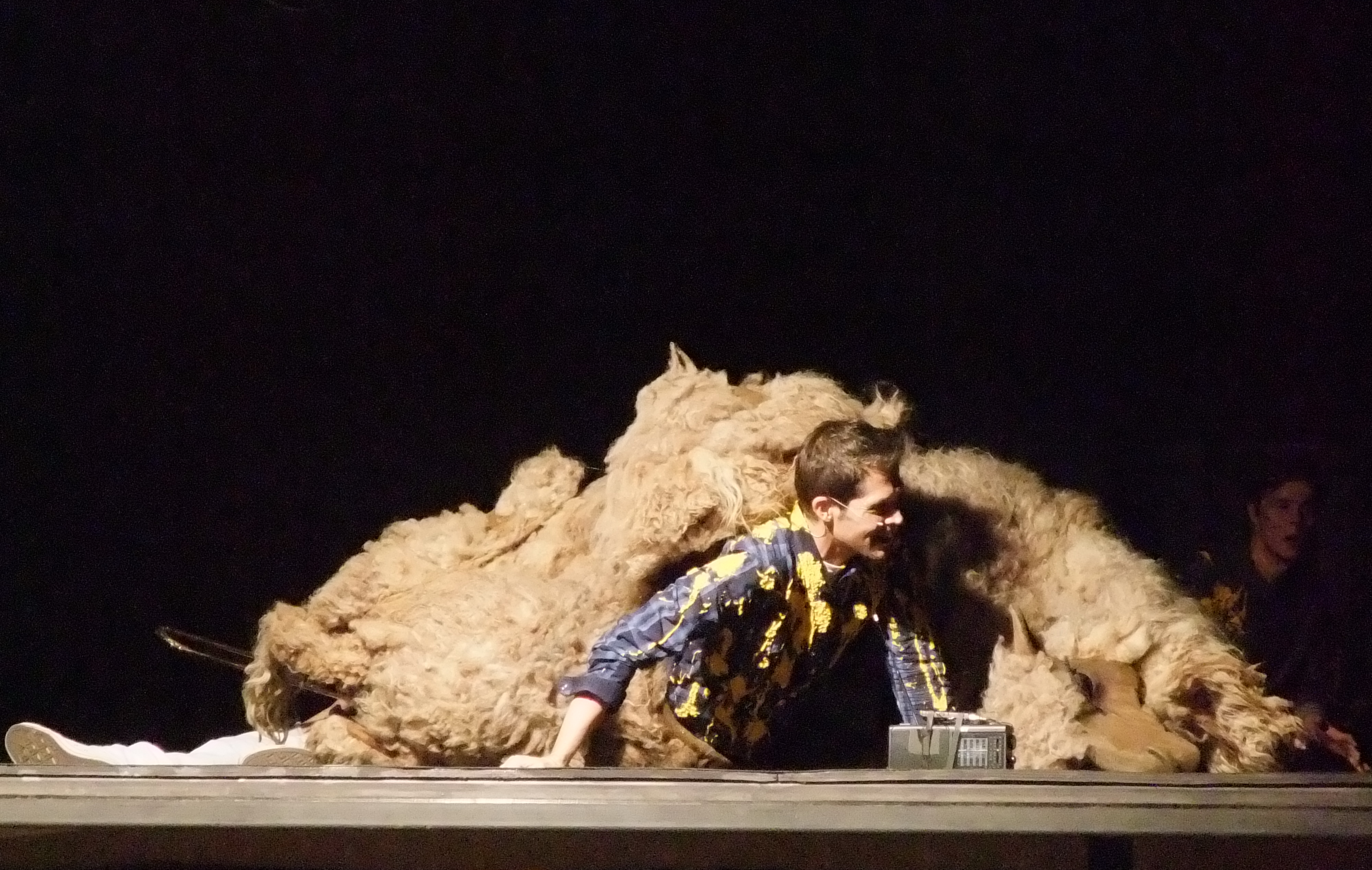
Luca (Michael Leibundgut), with his short-wave radio, emerges from Lucicamel (Birmingham Opera, 24 August 2012)

Operator
As Michael's Operator, Luca listens to broadcasts received on a short-wave radio in order to provide reports in response to problems successively posed by eleven delegates, who imitate him, poorly but humorously.

- Thinki. An alto delegate's question (in German) is accompanied by a flautist in an ornate cadenza, and the Operator replies (in English), that "Leo lion galaxies ask Michael if God wants Michael, Eve, Lucifer to work together for cosmic solidarity".

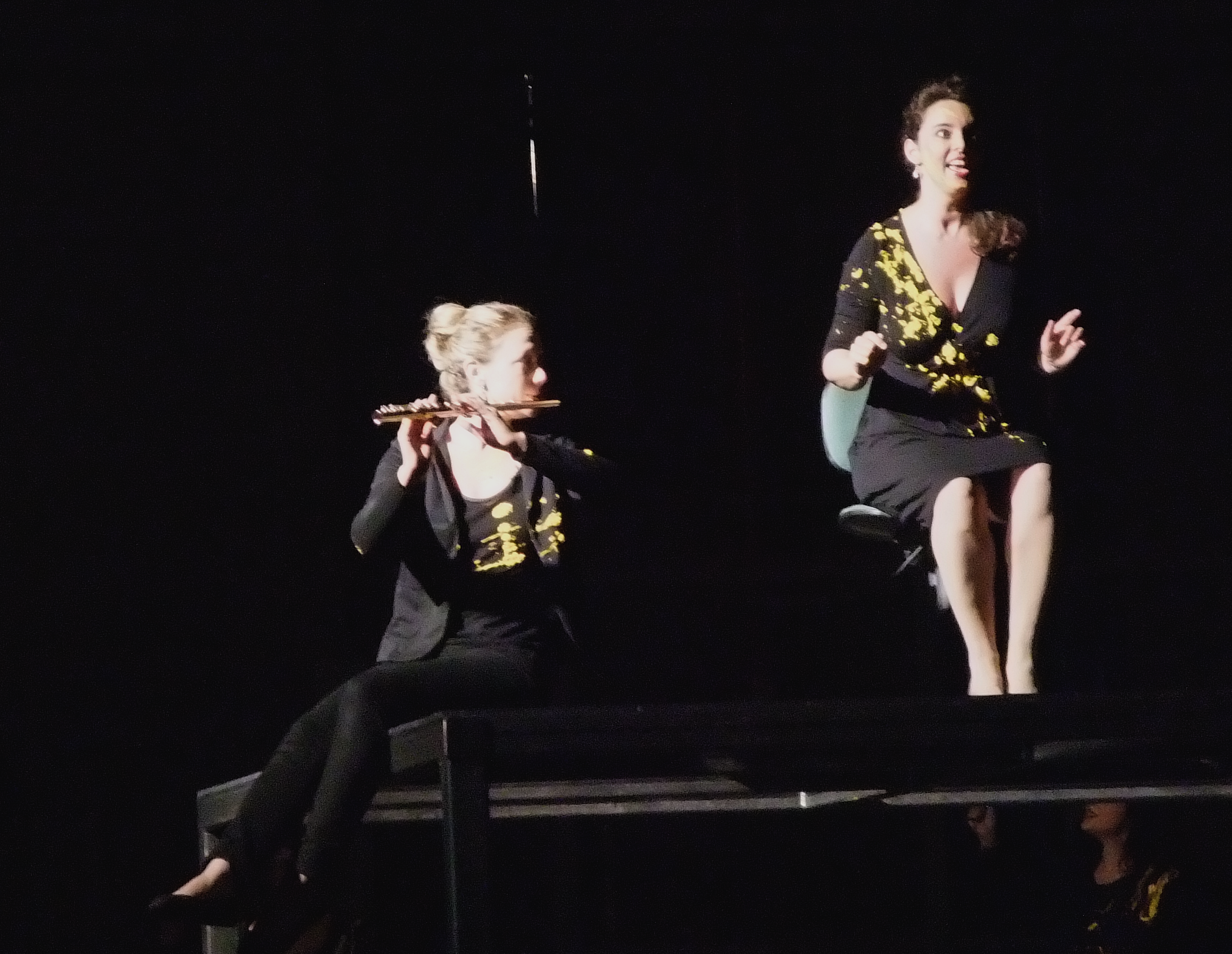
Just before the Space Sextet, a soprano (Ruth Kerr, accompanied by Chloé l'Abbé, flute) sings "I see … a clarinet above a harbour, a bassoon above a steam train, …" (Birmingham Opera, 24 August 2012)

- Bassetsu Trio (Carousel). Trombonut and the trumpeter are now joined by a basset-horn player. Together they play and dance in a stylized, rotating choreography as the choir receives instruction from the Operator in various styles of singing and languages (Noh, Kabuki, American, Russian, Swedish, Italian, Kölsch, French, Zulu, Bavarian, Greek, Dutch, North German, and Chinese). A soprano from the choir sings about her home, the sun of planet Earth—"terra magica"—describing moments from Orchester-Finalisten ("I see oboes above cathedrals, I see a cello gently floating above an airport by the sea ..."). The tenors enter slowly, each holding a small book and softly singing the text "Litanei" from Stockhausen's 1968 composition cycle Aus den sieben Tagen.
- "Menschen, hört" ("Mankind, Hear")—Space-Sextet. The delegates are sent out to the distant corners of the universe. Six of them are each presented with one of the planet-globes to take along, and come out into the auditorium to sing a concluding sextet as they rotate clockwise around the audience. As they leave the hall, the Operator is alone on the stage and gradually fades from sight, still transforming short-wave sounds, until only the nocturnal firmament is left shining above.

=== Mittwochs-Abschied ===
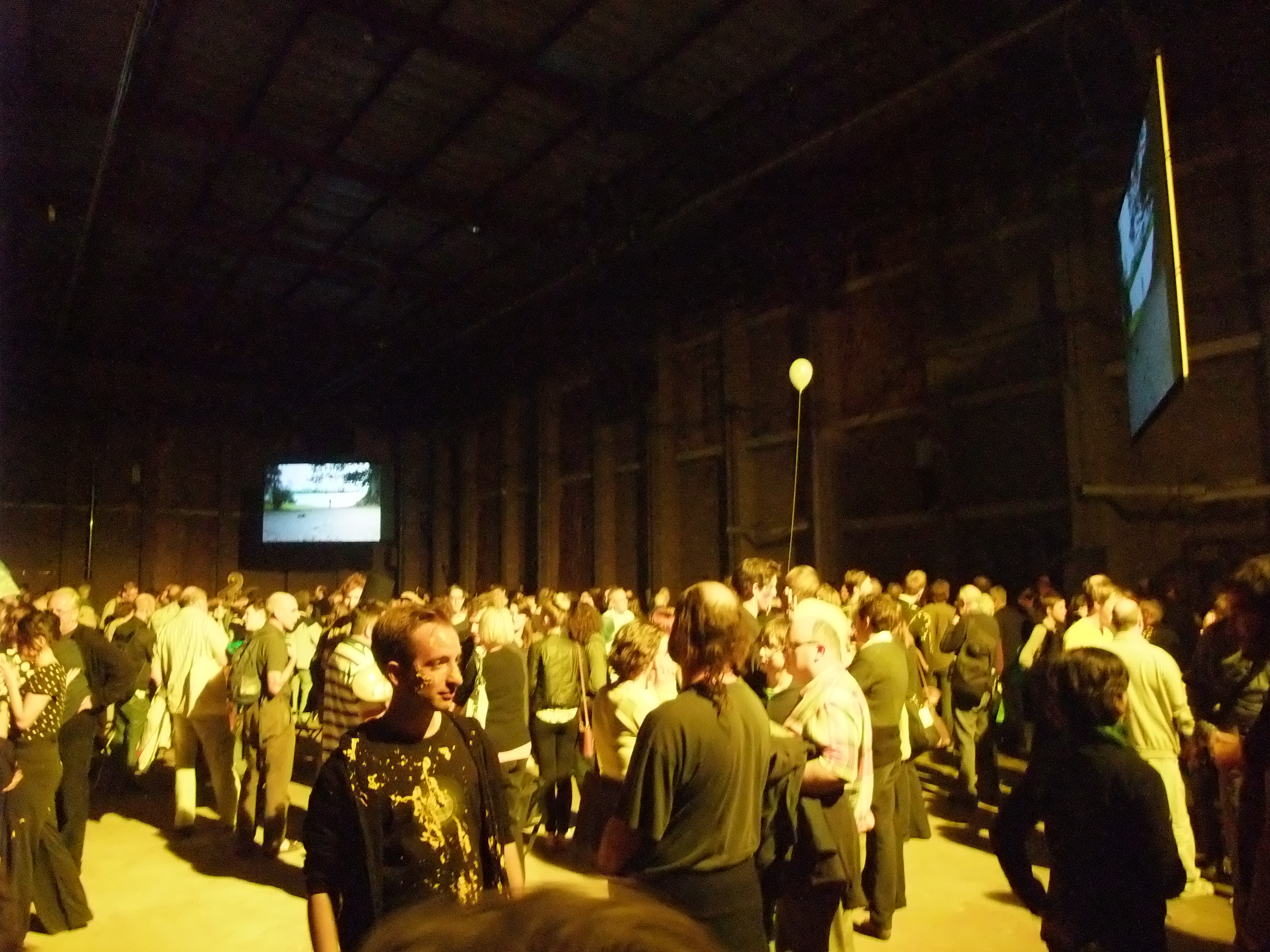
Mittwochs-Abschied, Birmingham, 23 August 2012

The Wednesday Farewell is the electronic music from scene 2 which, like the electronic music for act 2 of Dienstag, is projected octophonically through speakers arranged at the corners of a cube surrounding the audience. Here, however, it is played "beyond mirrored visions", in the form of video projections of the eleven space-events of Orchester-Finalisten, in the foyer as the audience departs.

== Press reception (staged premiere) ==
The premiere performances were sold out. The venue's capacity was 500 with the audience moving between the two massive halls of Argyle Works. Birmingham Opera Company fielded a 100 strong acting company of "Vick's wonderful army of talented volunteers", a trademark of the company, who performed alongside the singers and instrumentalists, and sometimes also amongst the audience, "holding the fulcrum between humour and mystery on which the whole production was so skilfully balanced". Writing in the Frankfurter Allgemeine Zeitung, Jörn Florian Fuchs cited Kathinka Pasveer's musical direction as a "truly brilliant realization of the score". Agreeing with this assessment of Pasveer's accomplishment, David Fallows added that "one of the important details of any live performance of Stockhausen has always been the sheer gorgeousness of the sound projection, making its impact right from the first moments of the magically lucid Wednesday Greeting". Anna Picard concluded in The Independent that it was an "unhurried, ecstatic promenade production" and that "Stockhausen's dream was realised wittily and lovingly".

Rupert Christiansen gave the production 4 out of 5 stars in The Telegraph, but he dismissed its third scene Helicopter String Quartet which he felt was "a banal gimmick, wasting an obscene amount of money and fuel to generate only a hideous amount of pointless noise". Christiansen cited Stockhausen's "bonkers sense of humour" as "a saving grace" of the production. Nick Richardson, writing in the London Review of Books, disagreed about the Helicopter Quartet, describing it as "fantastic on Thursday night, particularly at take-off, the strings' vigorous tremolos locking with the throb of the rotor blades and the warm, bass hum of engine".

Gisela Schwarz wrote in the Kölner Stadt-Anzeiger that Graham Vick had ably captured Stockhausen's diverse religious views without dismissing them as merely esoteric. Stephen Pritchard's review for The Observer concluded that the production was "undoubtedly" worth the reported £920,000 expense of the production:

This repertoire pushes the musicians to their absolute limits; the score may appear random but it's extraordinarily controlled and tightly organised, with passages of exquisite tranquillity. The message is resolutely warm, heartfelt and loving, moving in and out of language, space and time. It's a major achievement.

Mark Swed summed up his view of the production in the Los Angeles Times by writing, "the event was astonishing for the soul and simply beyond belief".

== Auxiliary works ==
In addition to the opera itself, various parts of which may be performed separately, there are four independent pieces made in different ways from versions of the Mittwoch formula:

- Europa-Gruss, Nr. 72, for winds (1992/1995/2002), originally conceived as the "greeting" for Mittwoch but replaced with the electronic music from Michaelion
- Trumpetent, Nr. 73, for four trumpets (1995)
- Mittwoch-Formel, Nr. 73 1/2, for percussion trio (2004)
- Klavierstück XVIII (Mittwoch-Formel), Nr. 73 2/3, for synthesizer (2004)

== Gallery ==
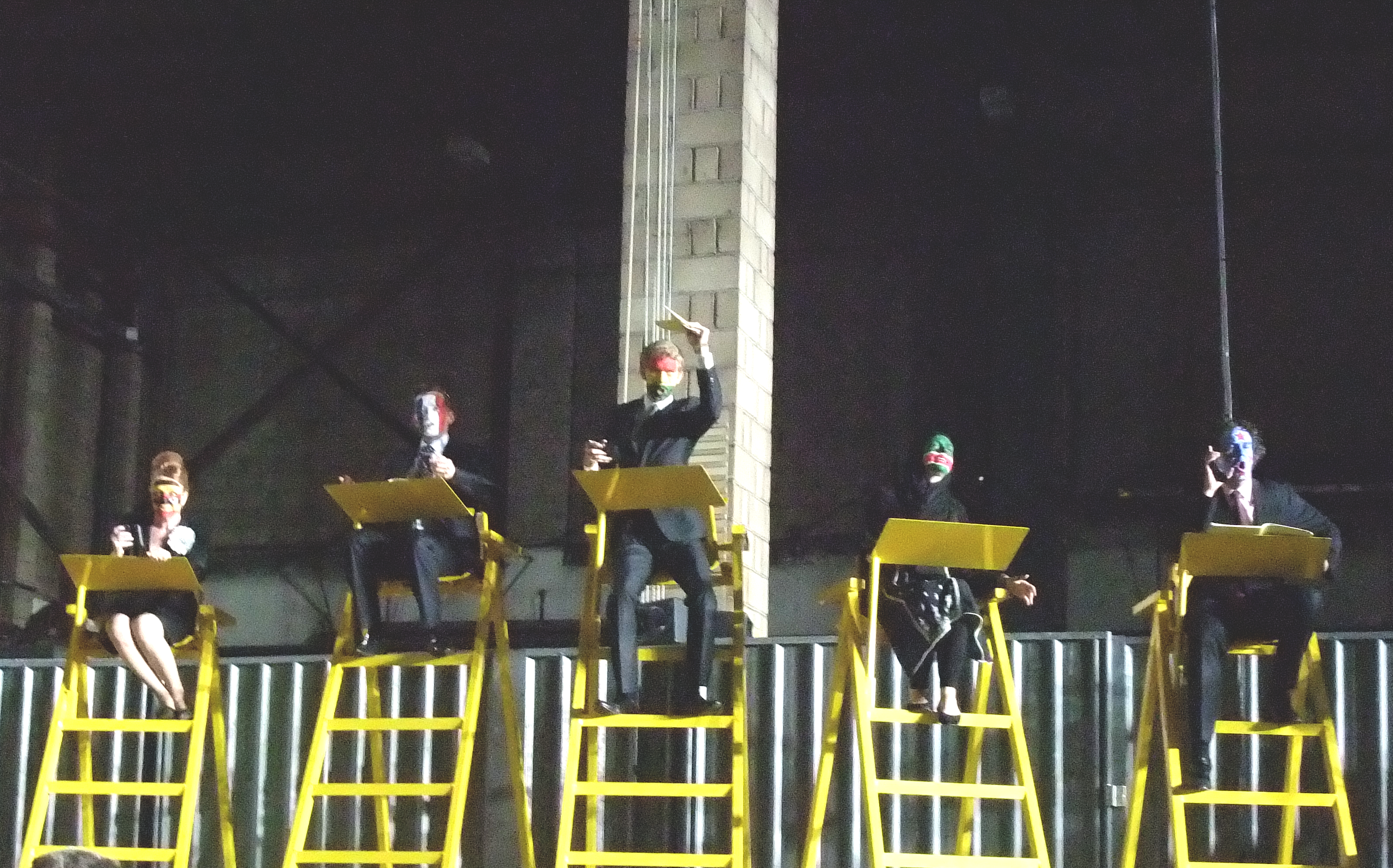
Debate in Welt-Parlament

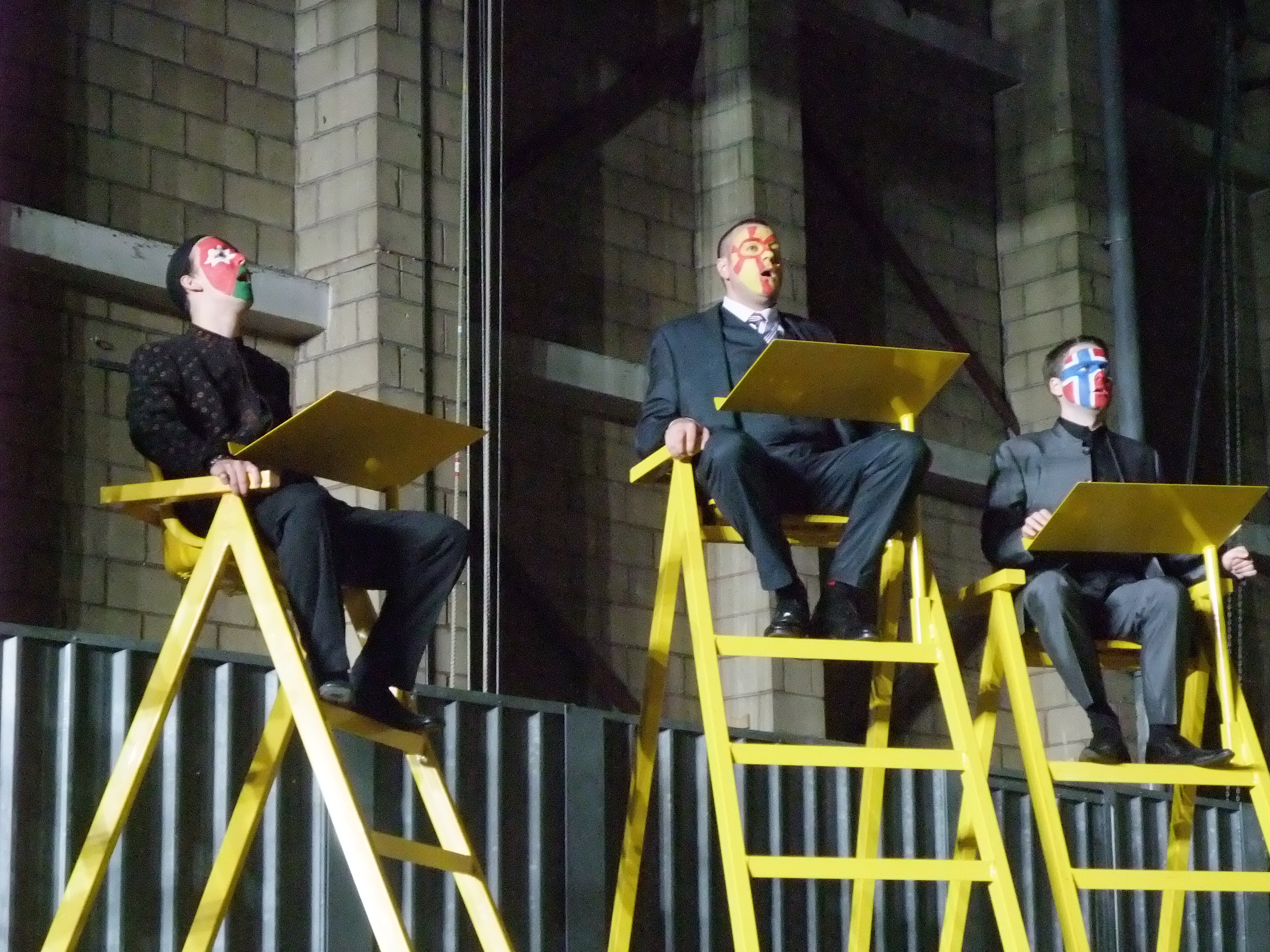
Dissent in Welt-Parlament

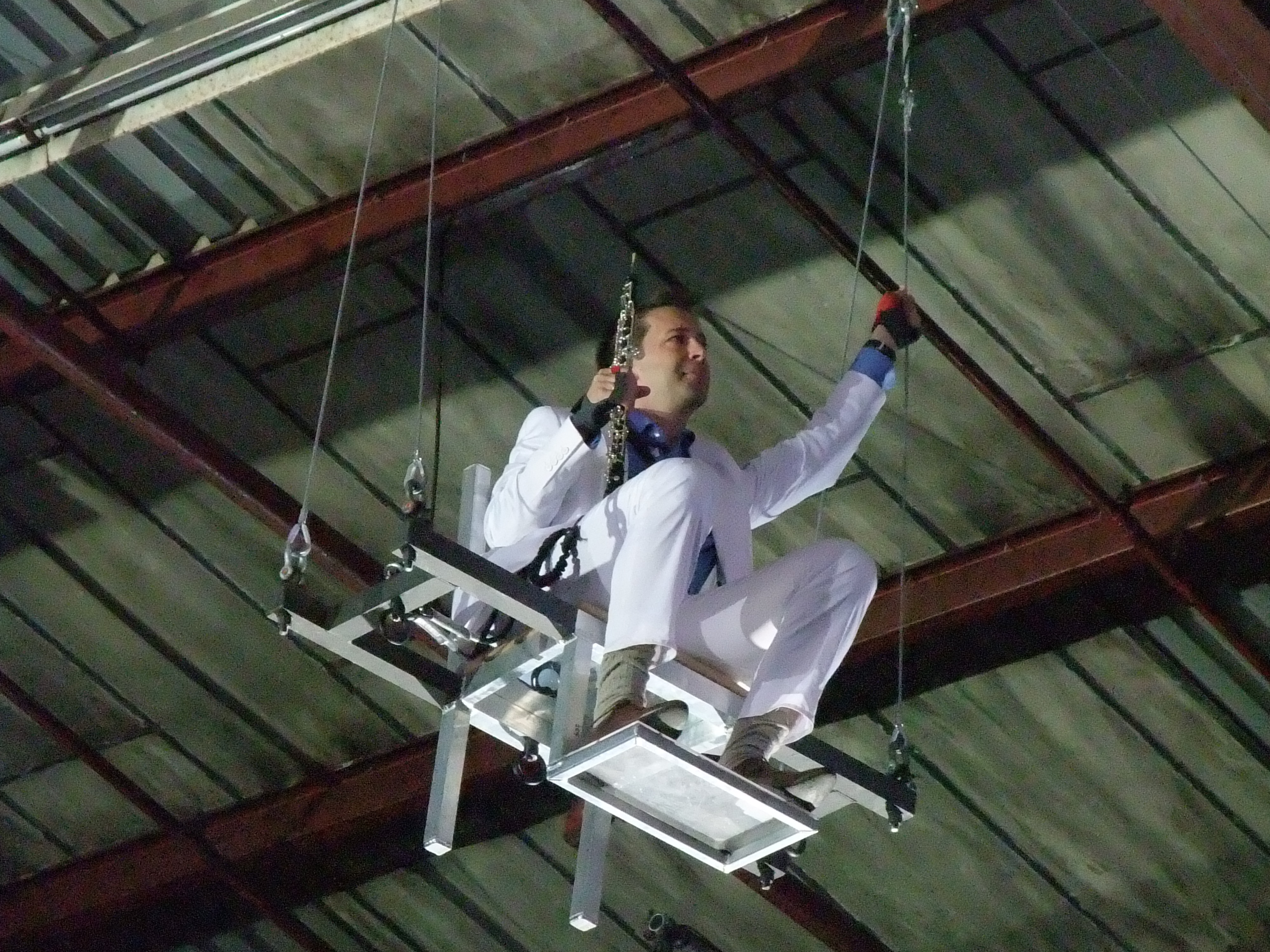
Dan Bates (oboe) in Orchester-Finalisten

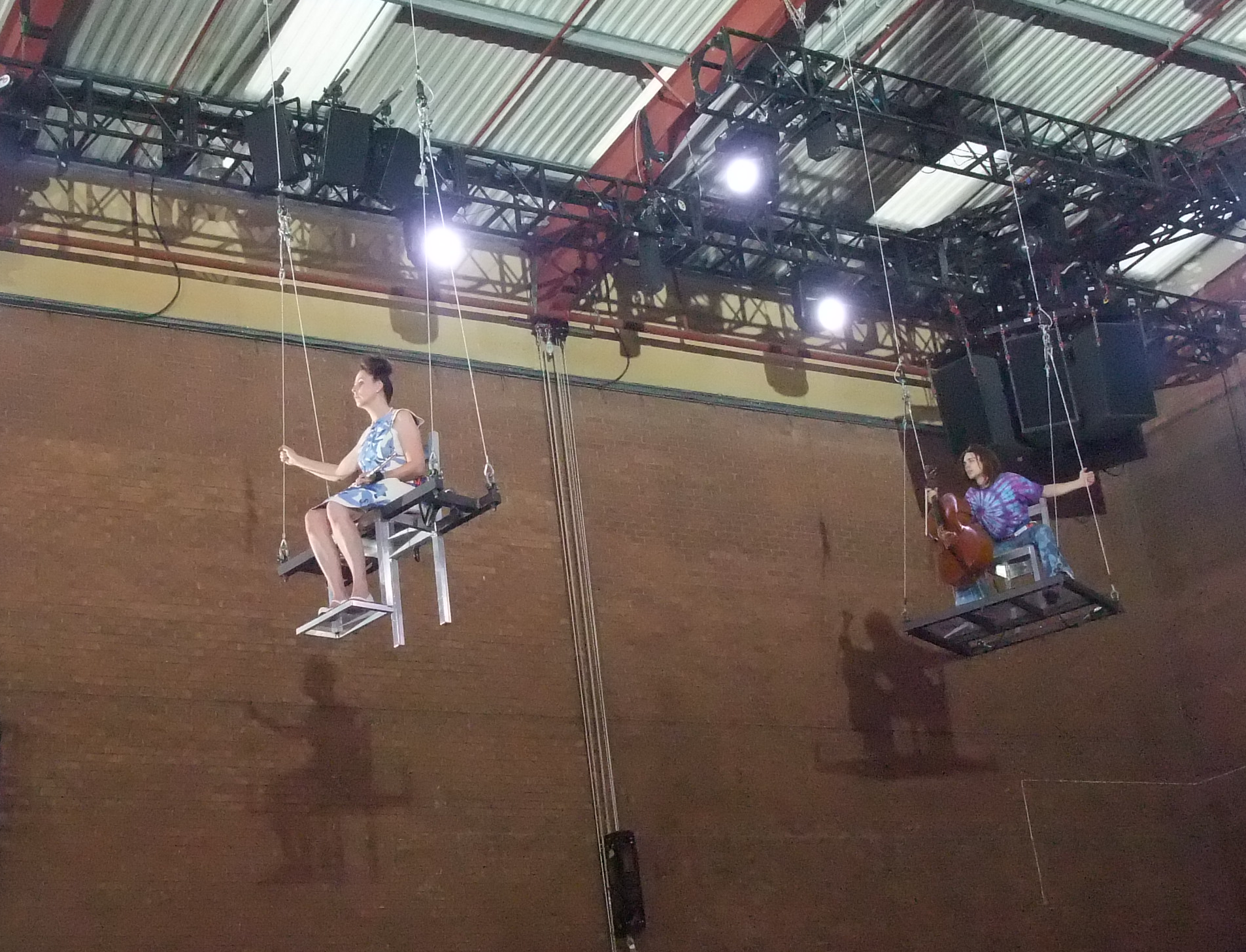
Karin de Fleyt (flute) and Jonathan Rees (cello) in Orchester-Finalisten

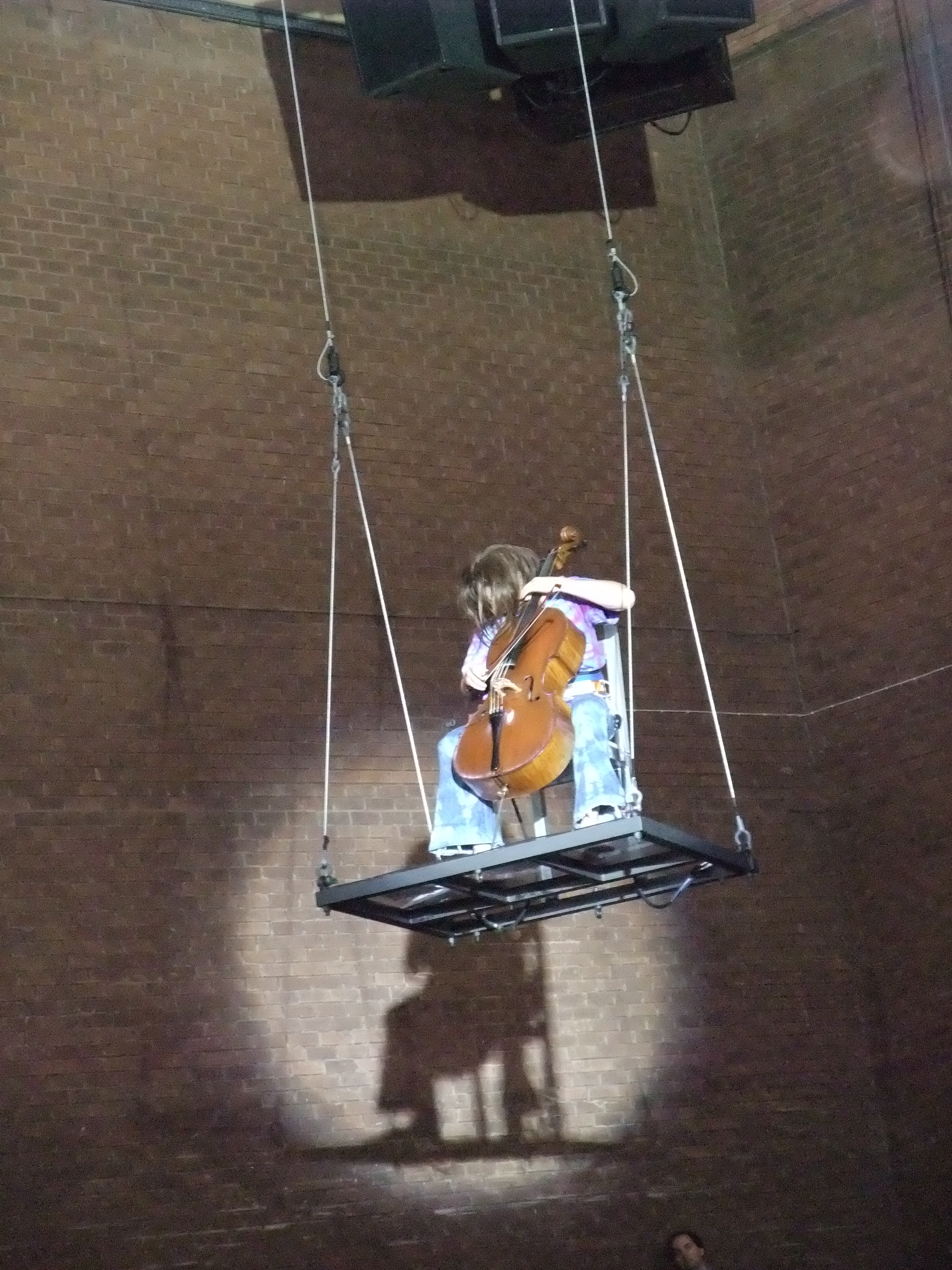
Cello solo (Jonathan Rees) in Orchester-Finalisten

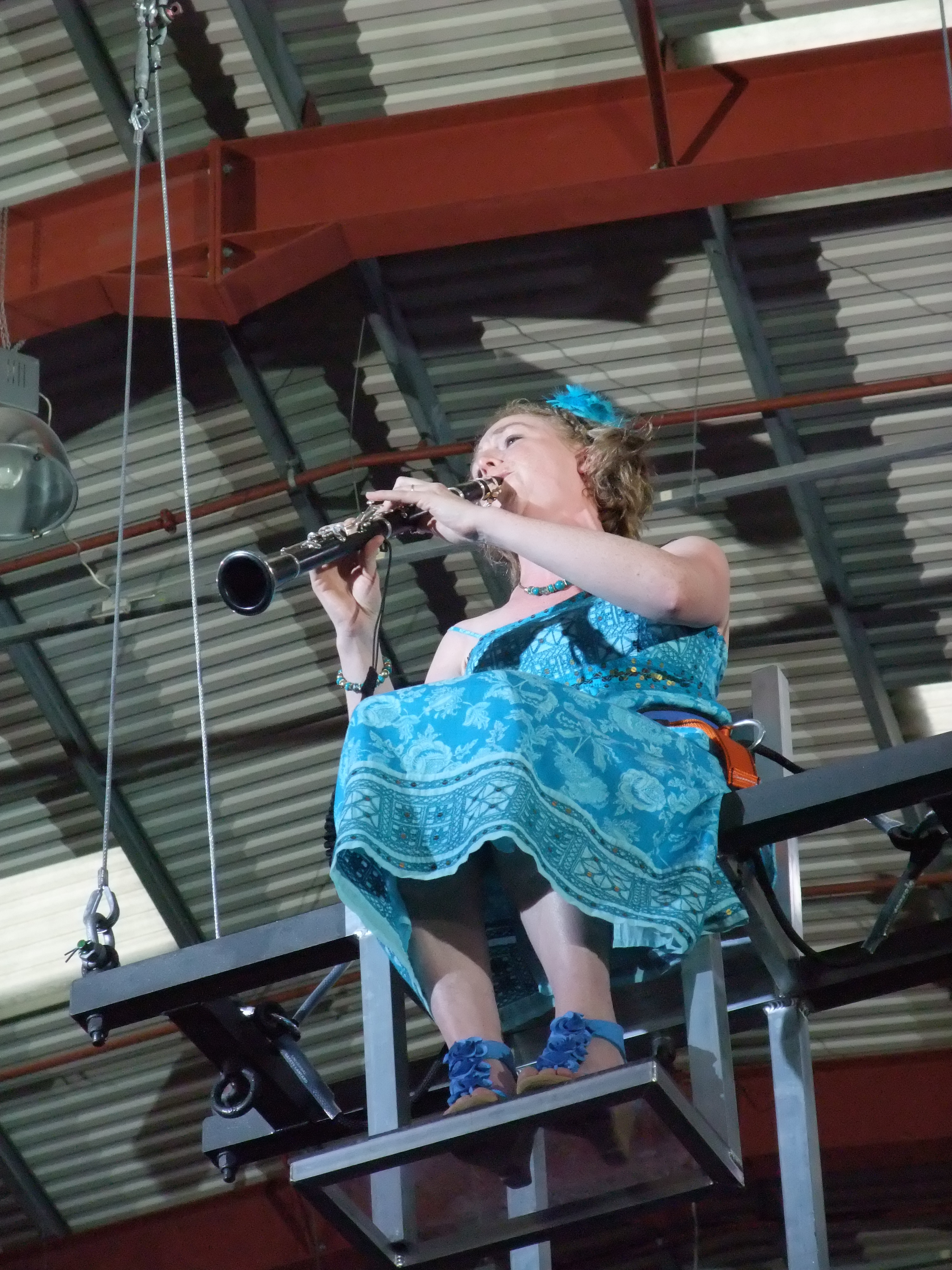
Clarinet solo (Vicky Wright) in Orchester-Finalisten

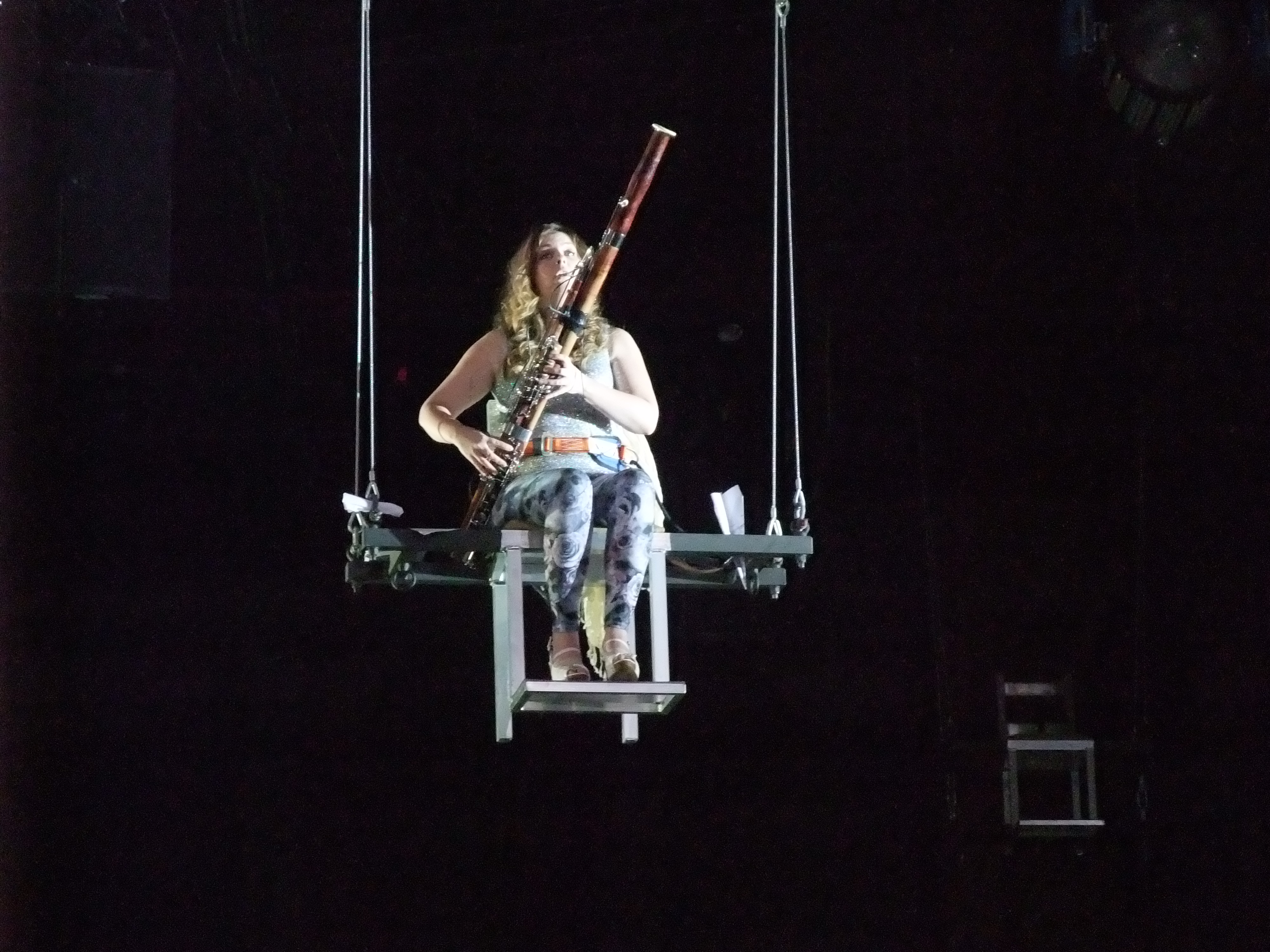
Bassoon solo (Amy Harman) in Orchester-Finalisten

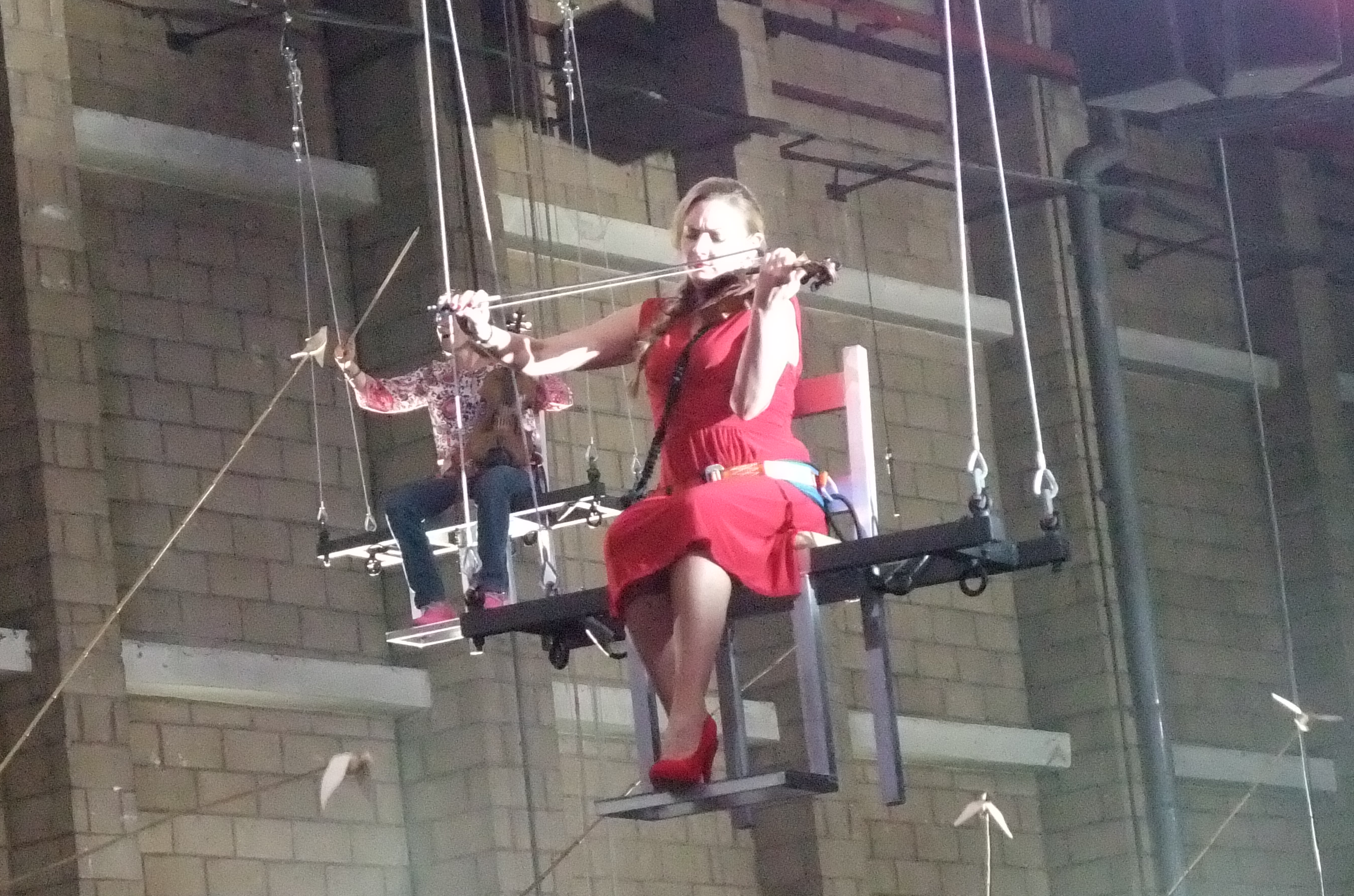
Violin solo (Debs White), with Bridget Carey, viola, in Orchester-Finalisten

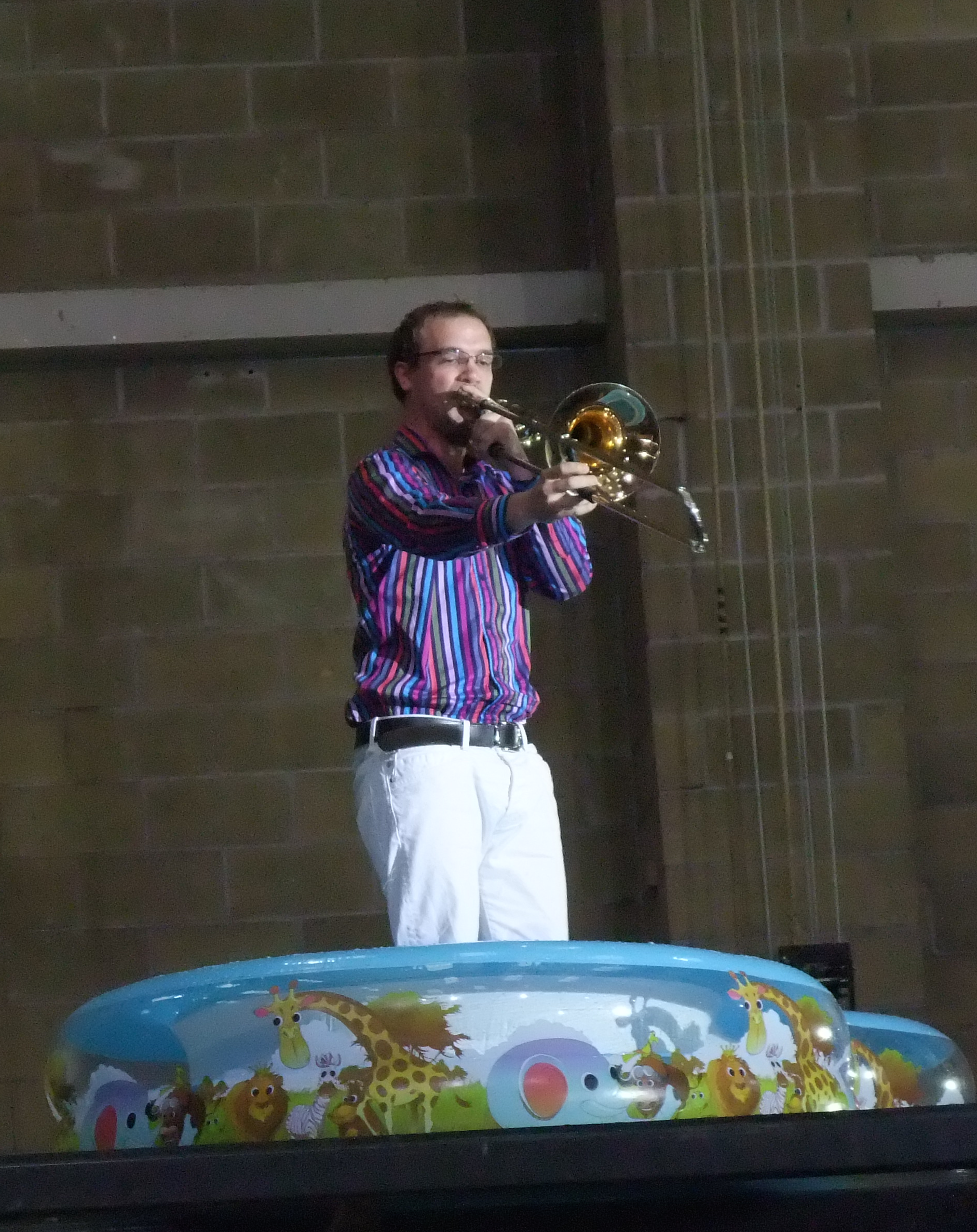
Trombone solo (Andrew Connington) in Orchester-Finalisten

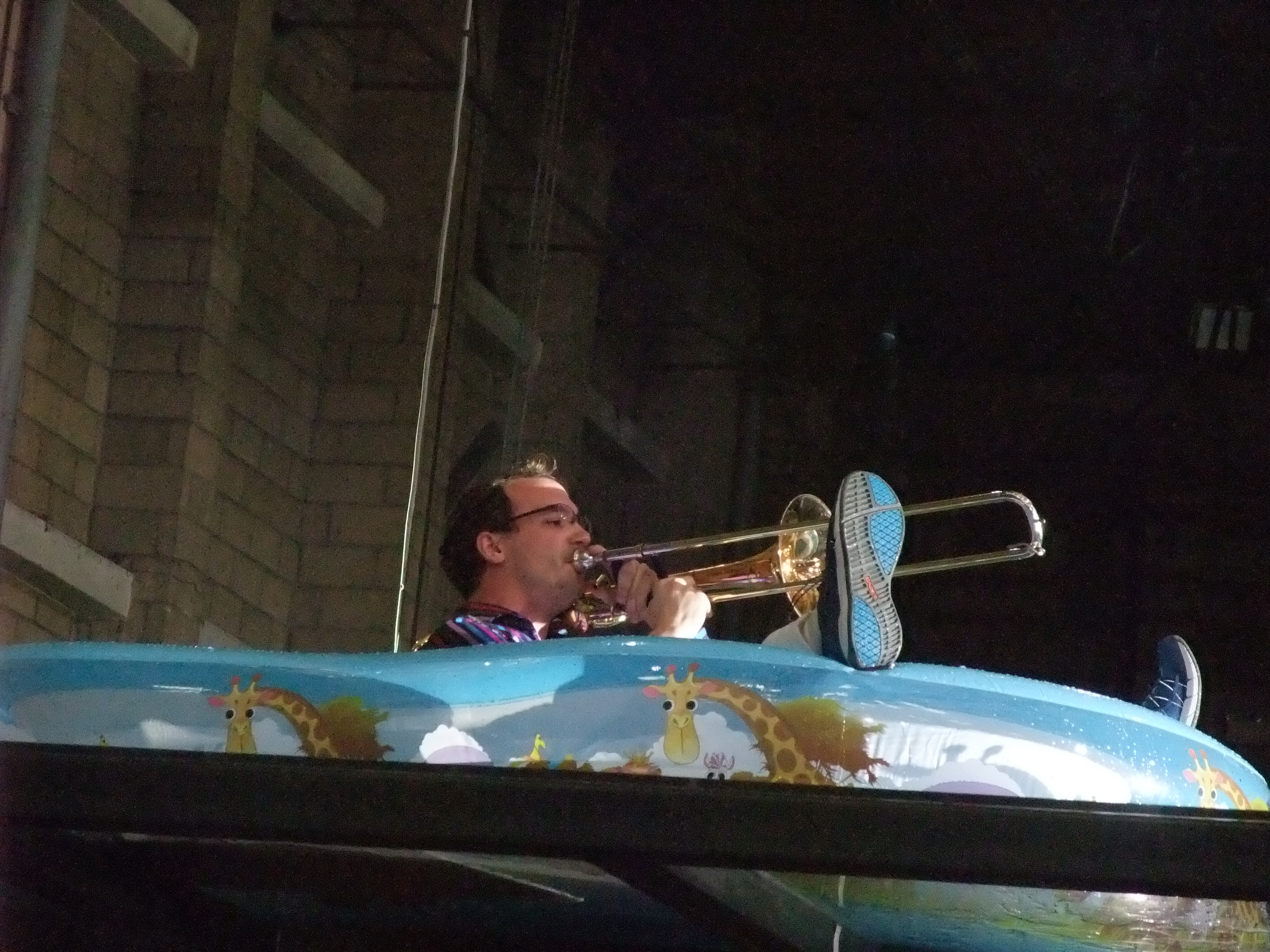
Trombone solo (Andrew Connington) in Orchester-Finalisten

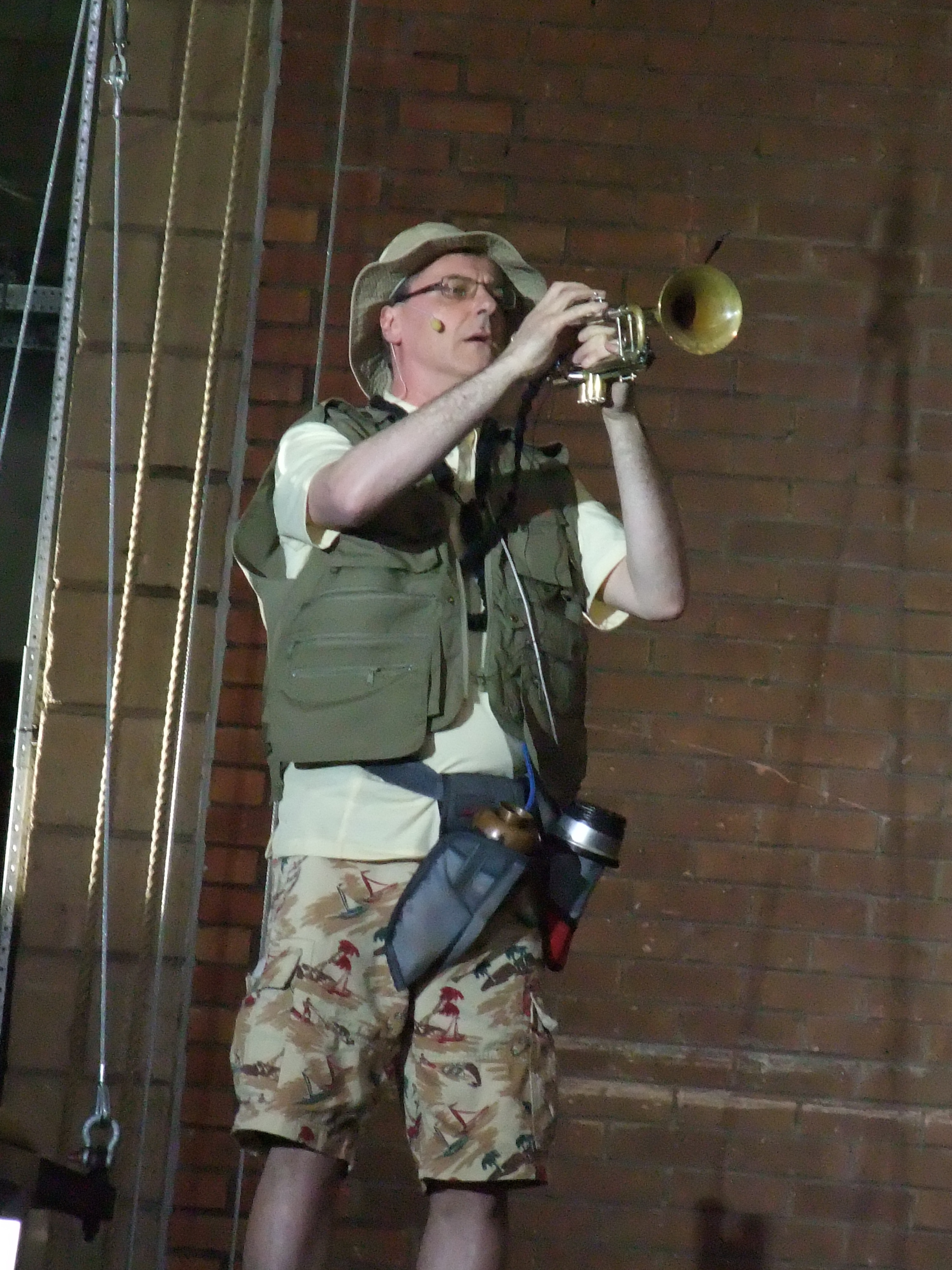
Trumpet solo (Bruce Nockles) in Orchester-Finalisten

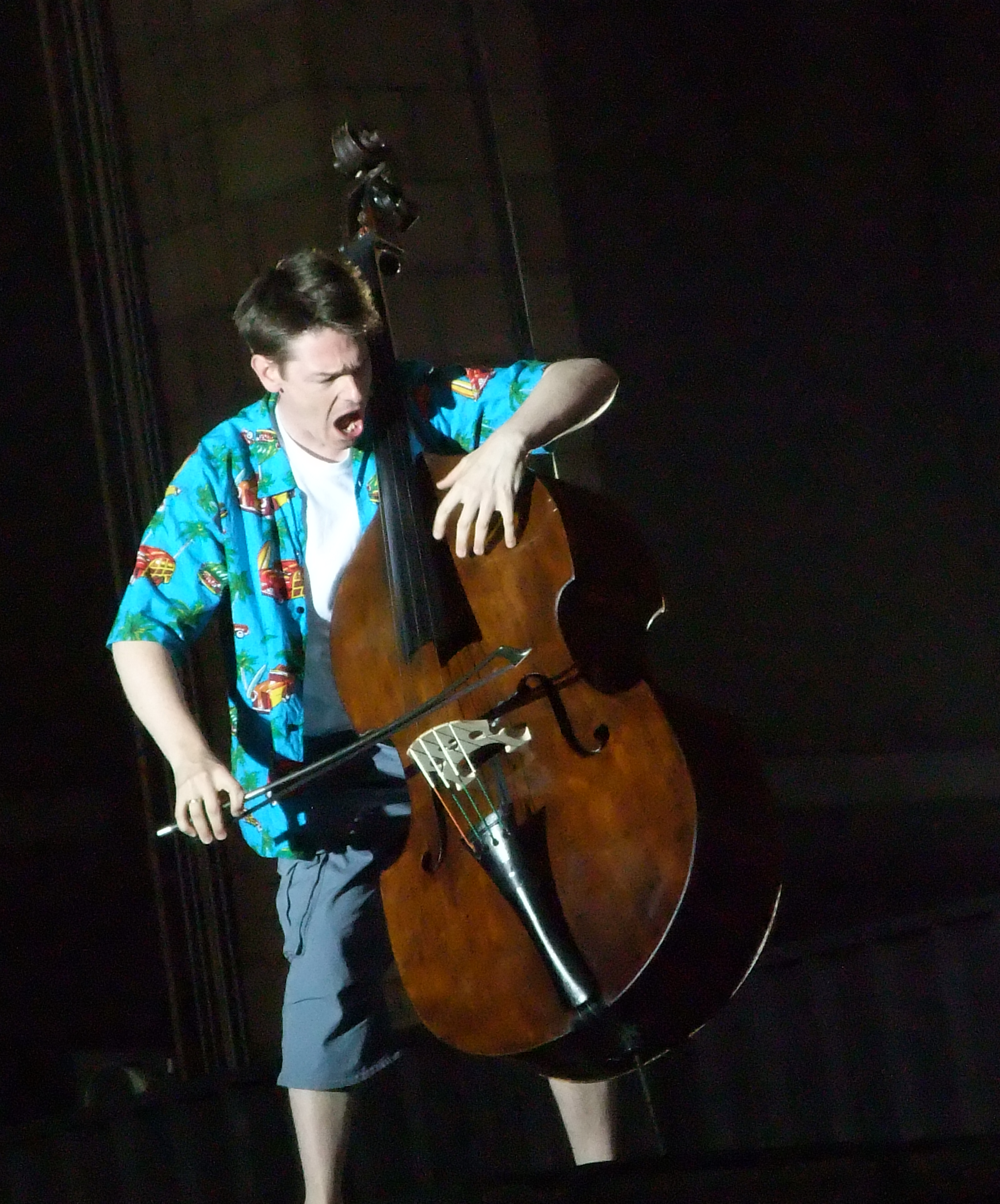
Contrabass solo (Jeremy Watt) in Orchester-Finalisten

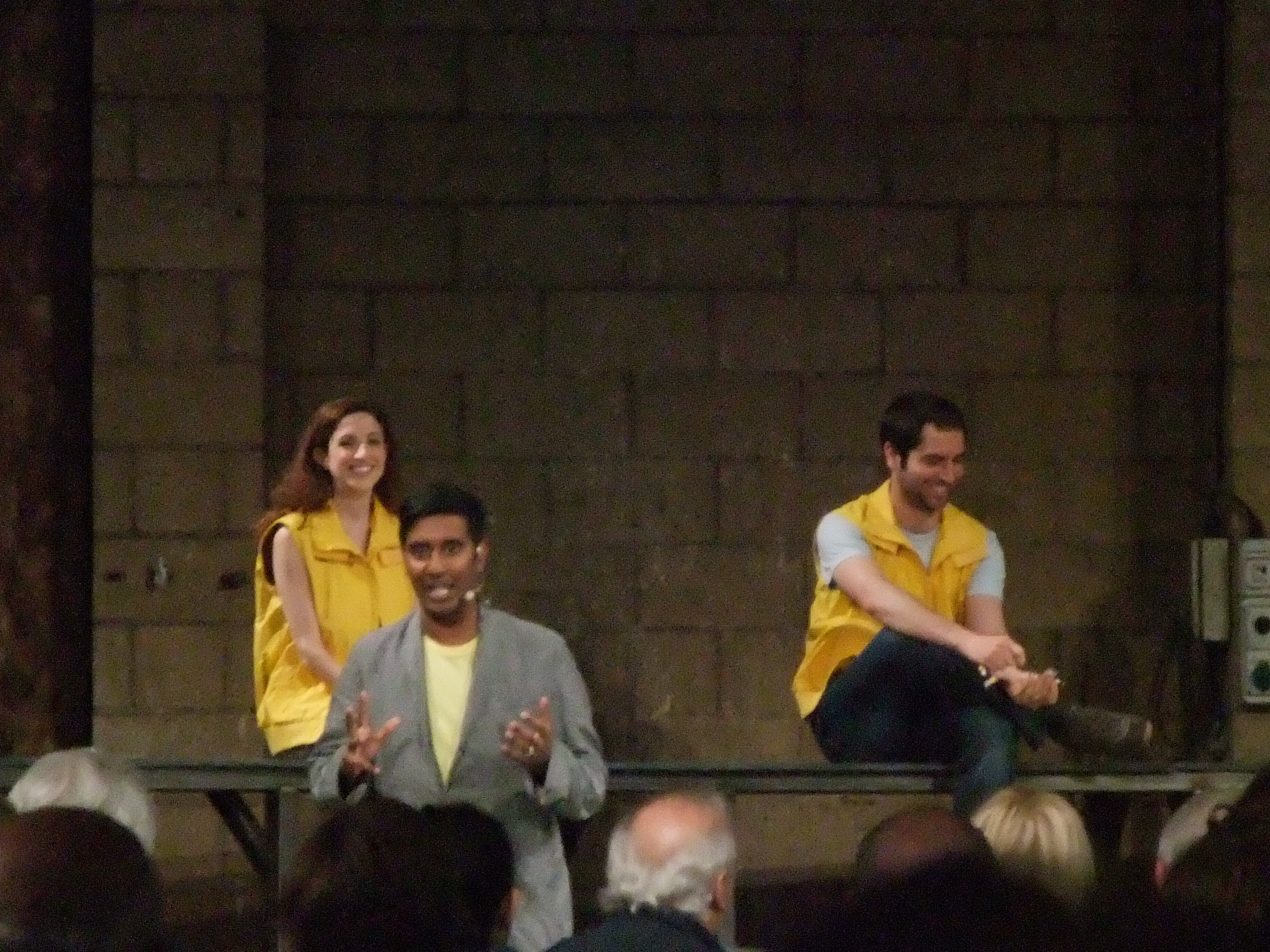
Elysian Quartet members Laura Moody and Vincent Sipprell, being introduced by DJ Nihal before the Helicopter String Quartet

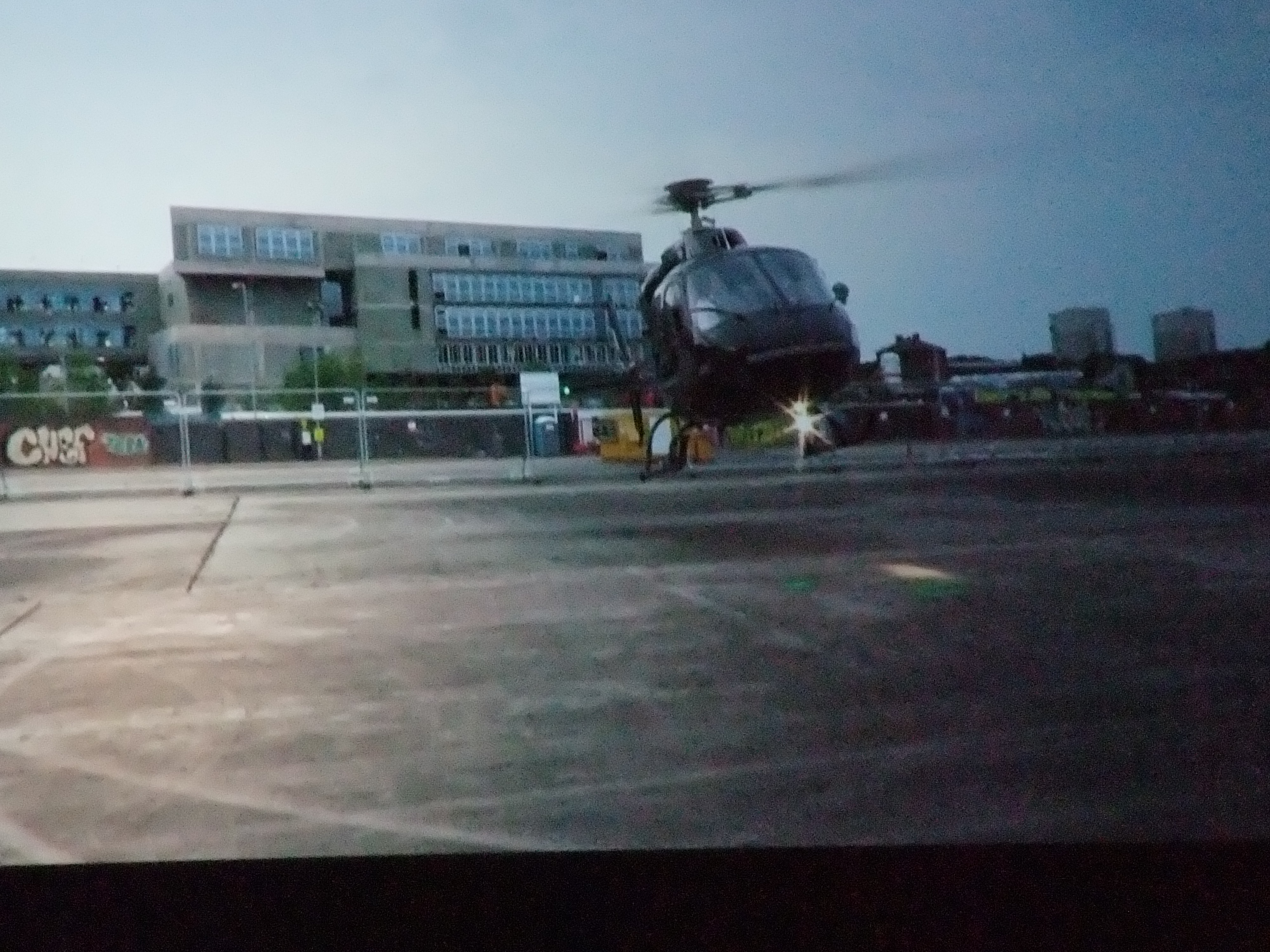
First helicopter lifts off in the Helicopter String Quartet

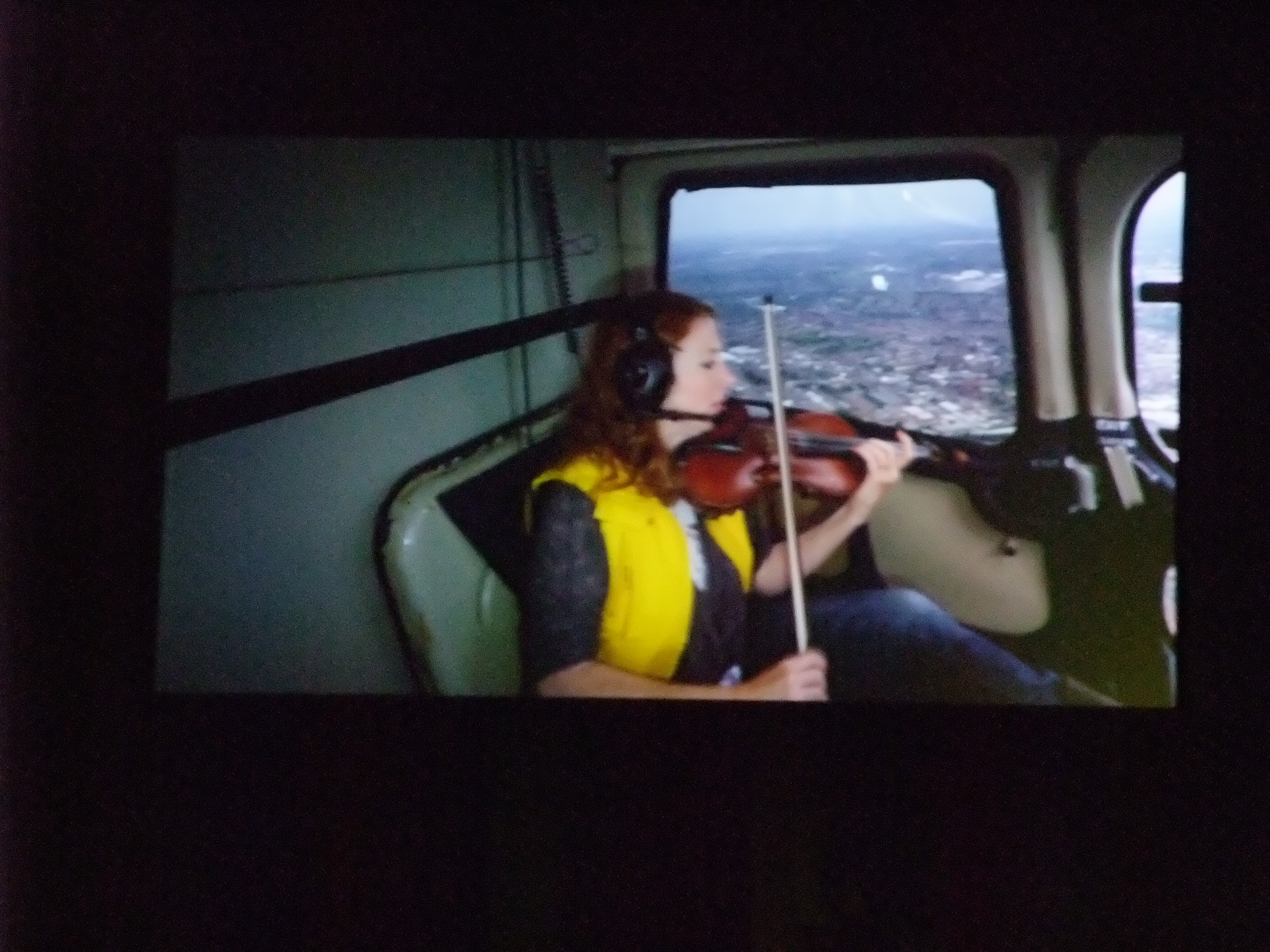
Jennymay Logan, second violin of the Elysian Quartet, Helicopter String Quartet, 23 August 2012

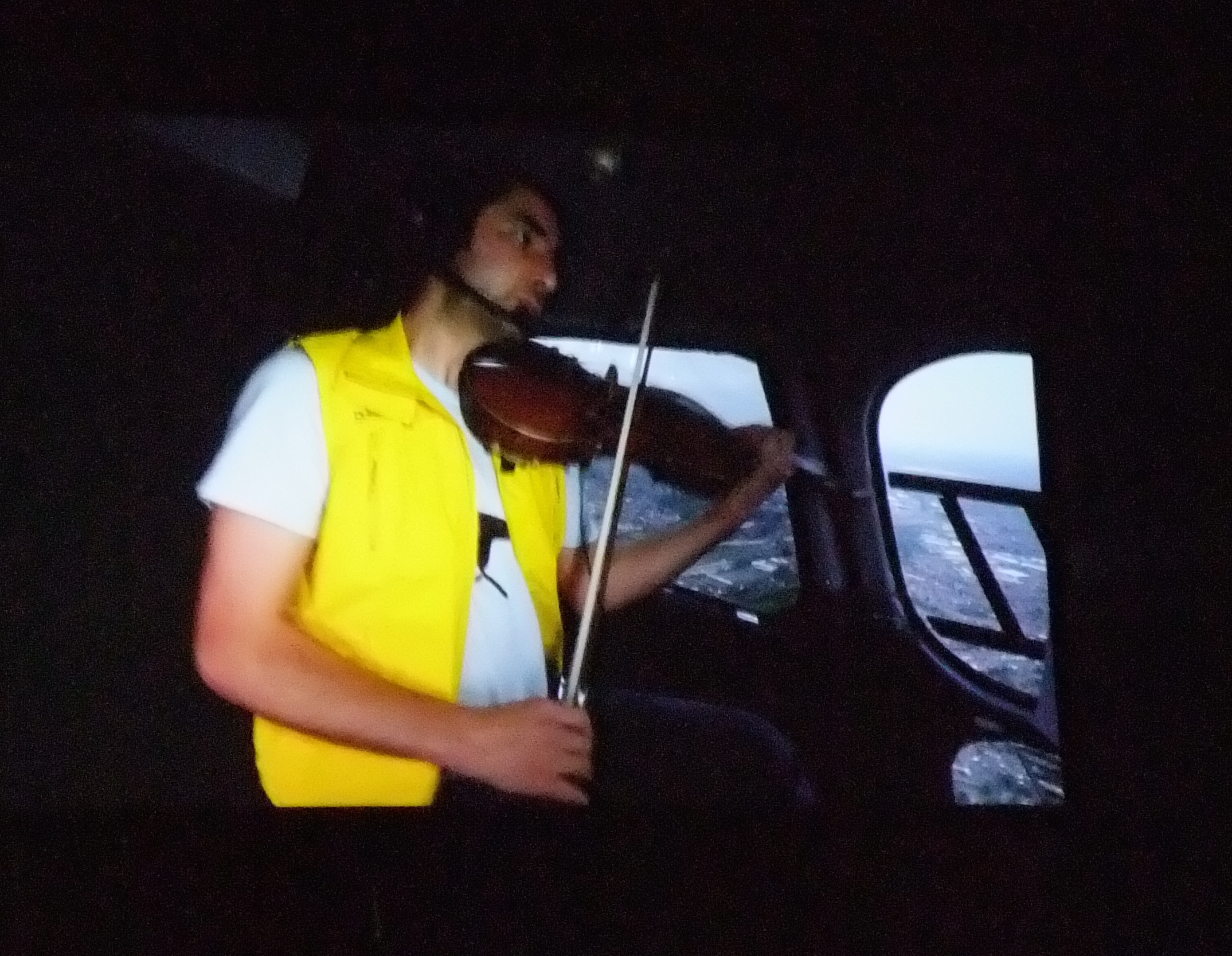
Vincent Sipprell, viola of the Elysian Quartet, Helicopter String Quartet, 23 August 2012

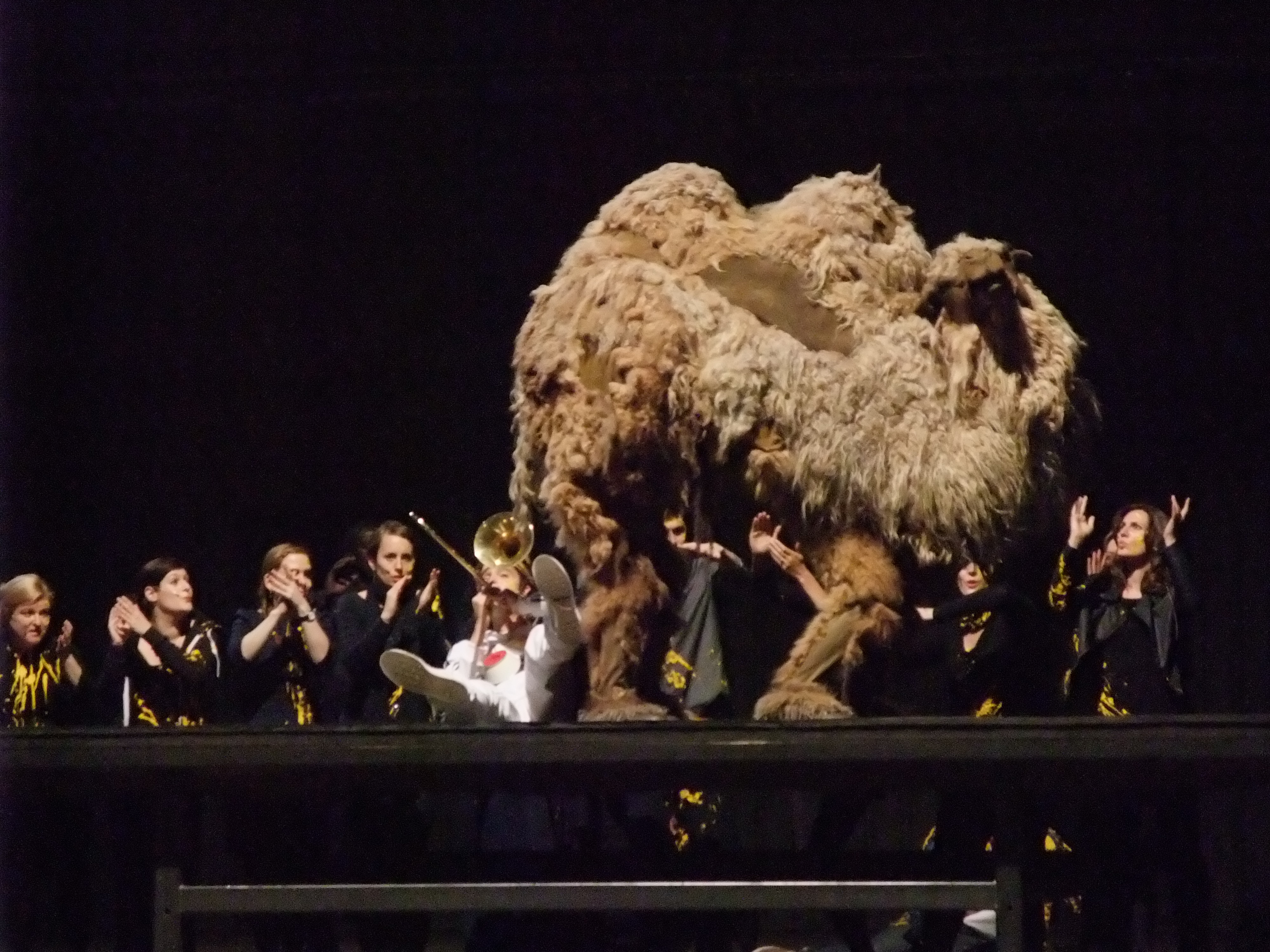
Michaelion, moment 50: Lucicamel, playing the bull, wins the "bullfight" and sits on Trombonut, playing the torero

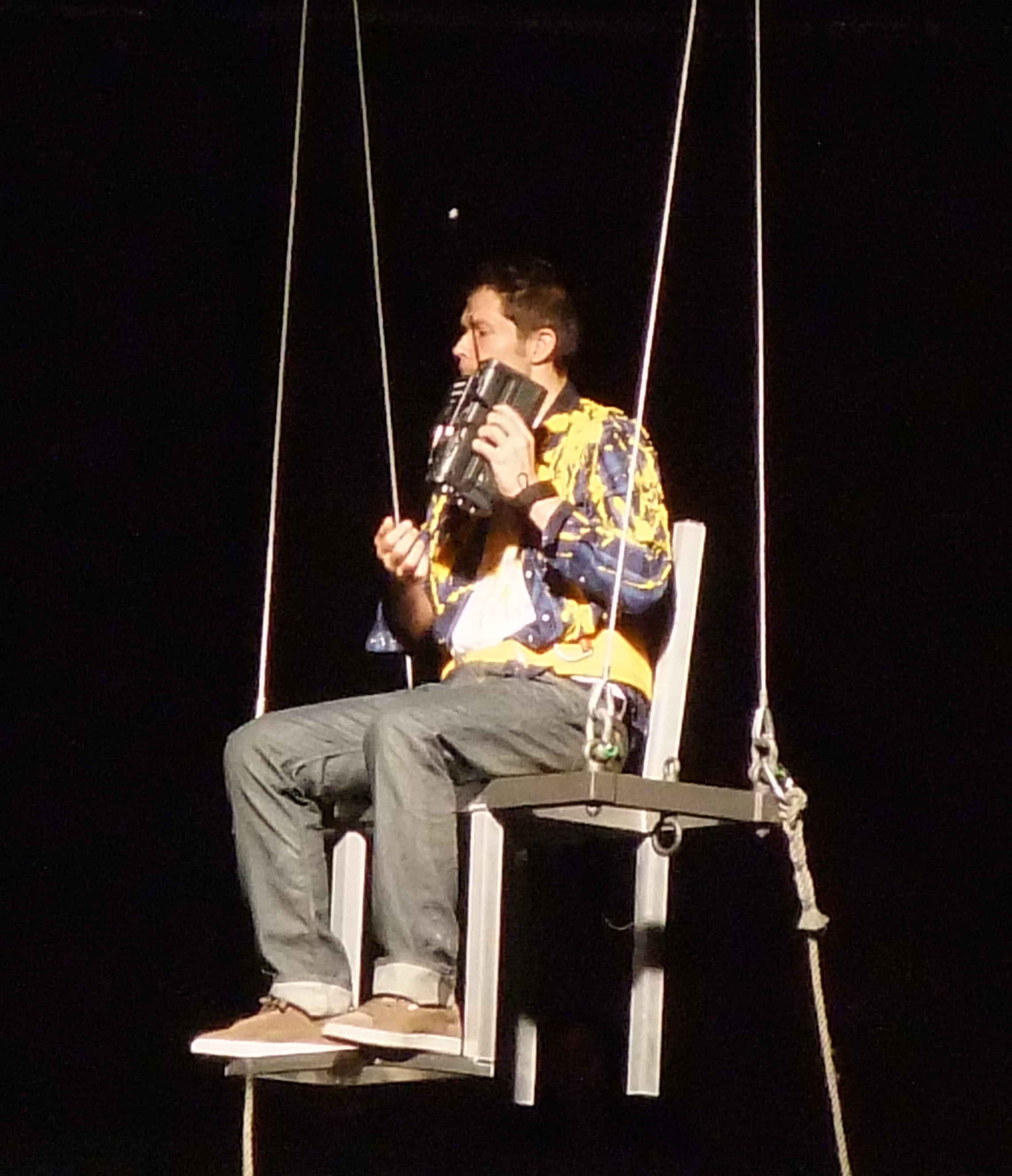
The Operator (Michael Leibundgut) with short-wave radio, in Michaelion

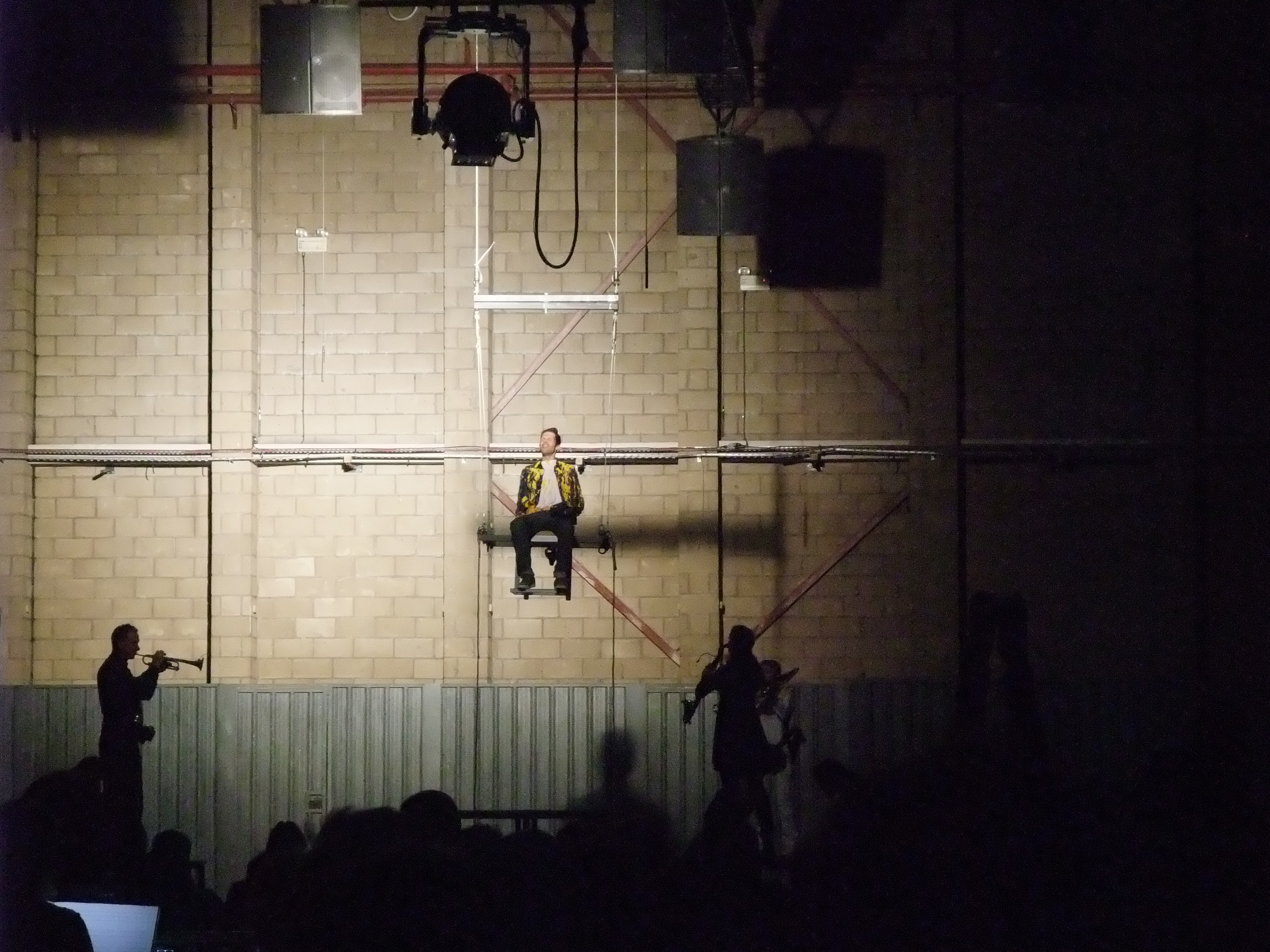
Moment 76: The Operator (Michael Leibundgut), with Marco Blaauw (trumpet), Fie Schouten (basset horn), and Stephen Menotti (trombone, concealed), 23 August 2012

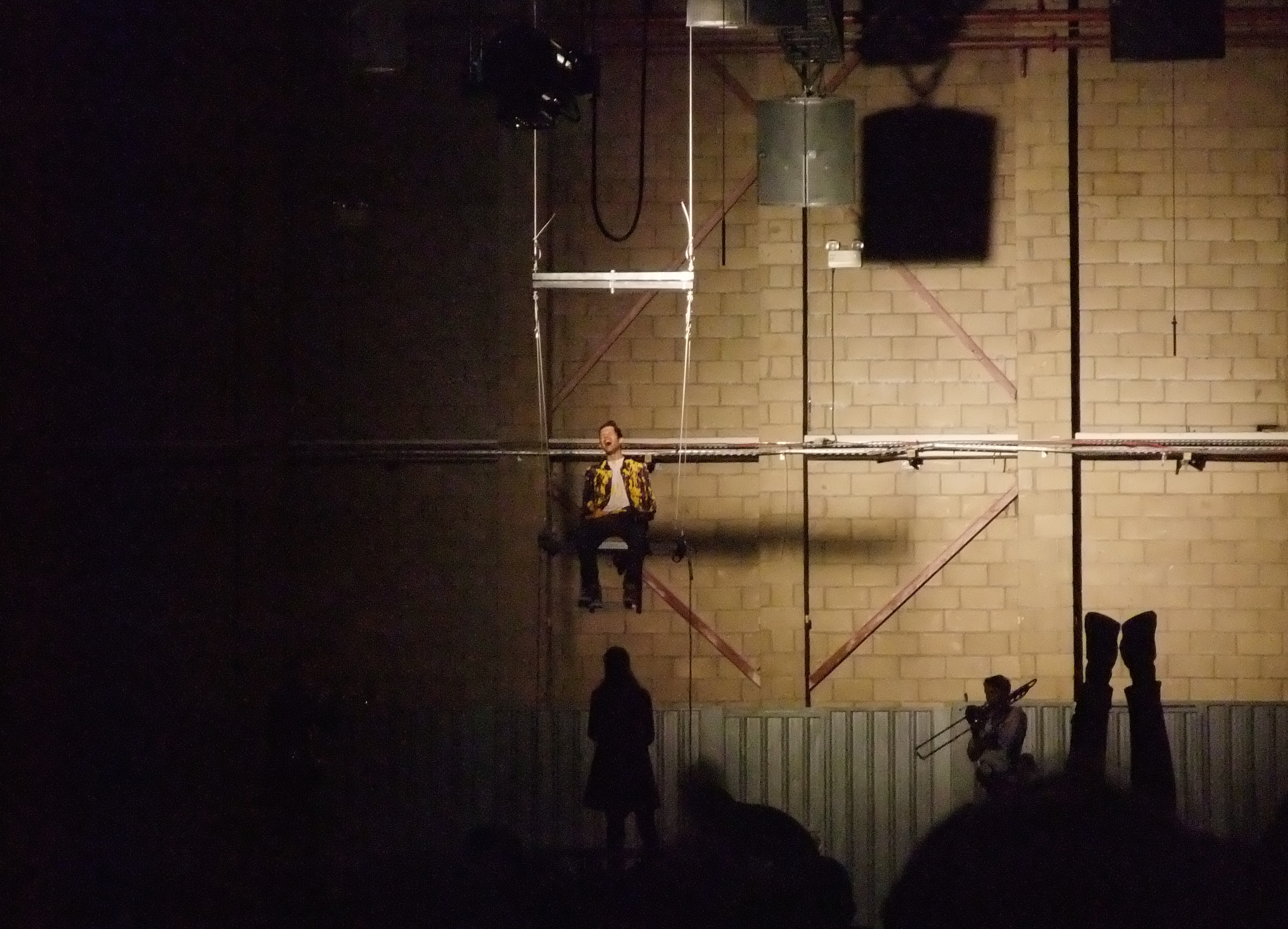
Moment 76: The Operator (Michael Leibundgut), with Marco Blaauw (trumpet, in the shadows), Fie Schouten (basset horn), and Stephen Menotti (trombone), 23 August 2012

== Discography ==
No integral recording of Mittwoch aus Licht has yet been released, although all of the components have now appeared. The SWR broadcast the whole opera in October 2003 using selections from the first six of the following CD releases plus the 1998 Bayerischer Rundfunk recording of the dress rehearsal of Michaelion.

- Mittwochs-Gruß. Antonio Pérez Abellán (synthesizer). Karlheinz Stockhausen (realisation). Stockhausen Complete Edition, CD 66. Kürten: Stockhausen-Verlag, 2003.
- Welt-Parlament. Südfunk Chor Stuttgart, Rupert Huber (cond.); Karlheinz Stockhausen (sound projection). Stockhausen Complete Edition CD 51. Kürten: Stockhausen-Verlag, 1996.
- Orchester Finalisten. Asko Ensemble, Amsterdam; Karlheinz Stockhausen (sound projection). Stockhausen Complete Edition CD 49. Kürten: Stockhausen-Verlag, 1997.
- Helikopter-Streichquartett: Uraufführung 1995 + Studioproduktion 1996. Arditti String Quartet (Irvine Arditti, Graeme Jennings [world premiere] and David Alberman [studio recording of the revised score], violins; Garth Knox, viola; Rohan de Saram, cello); "The Grasshoppers" (helicopter acrobatic team); Karlheinz Stockhausen, musical direction, recording supervision, sound projection, mix-down, and moderation [of the world premiere]. Stockhausen Complete Edition, Compact Disc 53 A-B (2 CDs). Kürten: Stockhausen-Verlag, 1999. Studio version also released on Montaigne Auvidis MO 782097 (CD).
- Helikopter-Streichquartett. Arditti String Quartet (Irvine Arditti & David Alberman, violins; Garth Knox, viola; Rohan de Saram, cello); "The Grasshoppers" (helicopter acrobatic team, recording from the third Amsterdam performance, mixed in). Arditti Quartet Edition 35. Montaigne Auvidis MO 782097 (single CD). Paris: Montaigne Auvidis, 1999.
- Bassetsu-Trio and Mittwochs Abschied. Suzanne Stephens (basset horn); Marco Blaauw (trumpet); Andrew Digby (trombone). Stockhausen Complete Edition, CD 55. Kürten: Stockhausen-Verlag, 2000.
- Vibra-Elufa for vibraphone, Komet for a percussionist and electronic and concrete music; Nasenflugeltanz from Samstag aus Licht for a percussionist and synthesizer; Klavierstück XVIII for synthesizer; Mittwoch Formel for 3 percussionists. Stockhausen Complete Edition CD 79. Kürten: Stockhausen-Verlag, 2005.
- Michaels-Ruf, Bassetsu for basset horn, Synthi-Fou, Quitt, Komet for a percussionist, Trumpetent. Markus Stockhausen, Andreas Adam, Marco Blaauw, Achim Gorsch (trumpets), Suzanne Stephens (clarinet and basset horn), Stuart Gerber (percussion), Antonio Pérez-Abellán (synthesizer), Kathinka Pasveer (alto flute) Stockhausen Complete Edition CD 82. Kürten: Stockhausen-Verlag, 2007.
- Tara Bouman, Klarinette, Bassetthorn: Contemporary. Includes Klarinette aus Orchesterfinalisten from Mittwoch aus Licht. (CD) DeutschlandRadio Aktivraum AR 50101. Cologne: Aktivraum Musik, 2003.
- Michaelion. Michael Leibundgut (bass); Chloé l'Abbé (flute); Fie Schouten (basset horn); Marco Blaauw (trumpet); Stephen Menotti (trombone); Antonio Pérez Abellán (synthesizer); London Voices (Terry Edwards and Ben Parry, co-directors; Nigel Short, Matthew Morley, and Gregory Rose, chorus masters); Kathinka Pasveer (sound projection). Recorded 13–15 August 2012, at the Argyle Works, Birmingham, UK. Stockhausen Complete Edition CD 54. Kürten: Stockhausen-Verlag, 2013.
- Kamel-Tanz. Michael Leibundgut (bass), Stephen Menotti (trombone), tape prepared by Antonio Pérez Abellán, recorded 25 July 2013 at Sound Studio N, Cologne; Rotary Wind Quintet. Quintette Aquilon (Marion Ralincourt, flute; Claire Sirjacobs, oboe; Stéphanie Corre, clarinet; Marianne Tilquin, horn; Gaêlle Habert, bassoon), recorded12 August 2014 at Sound Studio N, Cologne. With In Freundschaft for oboe; Linker Augentanz; Taurus; Taurus-Quintett. CD recording, 1 disc: digital, 12 cm, stereo. Stockhausen Complete Edition CD 105. Kürten: Stockhausen-Verlag, 2015.

== Filmography ==
- Helicopter String Quartet, a film by Frank Scheffer. Close-up: documentaireserie waarin Frank Scheffer zijn visie geeft op diverse 20e-eeuwse componisten. [S.l.]: AVRO. Televisie-opname, 1995.
  - German DVD release (German and English, DVD) Helicopter String Quartet. Frank Scheffer; Karlheinz Stockhausen. Kürten, Germany: Stockhausen-Verlag, 2006.
  - London Helicopter String Quartet. Frank Scheffer; Ton van der Lee; Karlheinz Stockhausen 2008, 1995. German Visual Material: Videorecording: DVD video 1 videodisc (77 min.) : sd., col.; 4 3/4 in (120 mm)
  - French DVD release. Helicopter String Quartet. Karlheinz Stockhausen; Frank Scheffer. 2008, 1995. Videorecording: DVD video 1 DVD-Video (113 Min. [error: 77 mins., like the others]) + 1 Begleitblatt. [Paris]: Idéale Audience International.
- Stockhausen: Helikopter Streichquartett. Sound Director: André Richard. a co-production with Red Bull & Salzburg Festival. Bernhard Fleischer Moving Images, 2003. (Archive from 8 September 2012, accessed 23 July 2018.)
- Stockhausen, Michaelion, scene 4 from Mittwoch aus Licht. Colour film by Suzanne Stephens. 59 minutes. (Archive No. 109 / 1). Live recording of the world première on July 26, 1998 in Munich at the Prinzregenten Theatre with the Choir of the South German Radio (conductor: Rupert Huber), Michael Vetter (short-wave singer), Kathinka Pasveer (flute), Suzanne Stephens (basset-horn), Marco Blaauw (trumpet), and Andrew Digby (trombone). Kürten: Stockhausen-Verlag, 1998.
