= Tierkreis (Stockhausen) =

1975 composition by Karlheinz Stockhausen

- Character pieces by Karlheinz Stockhausen
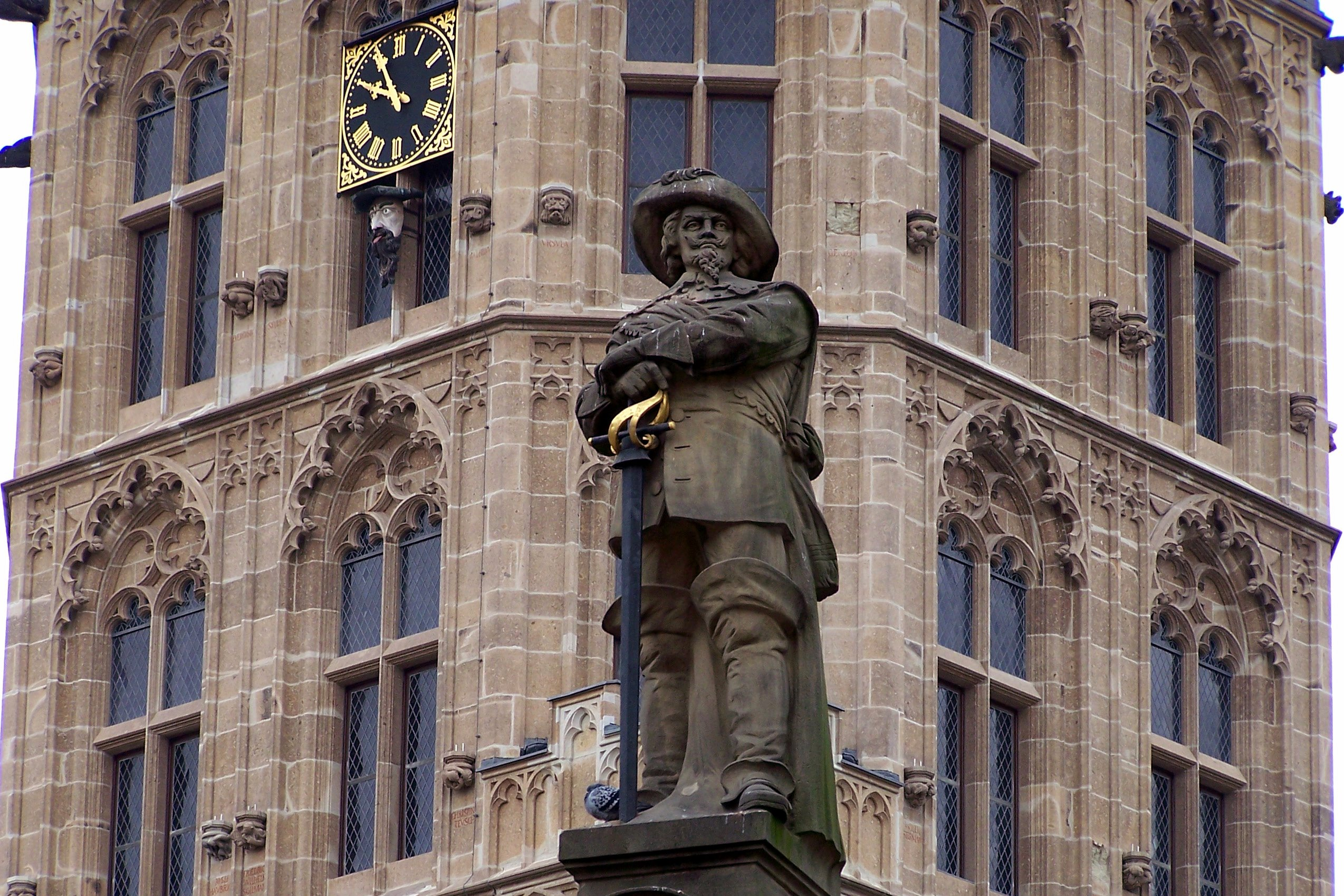
- Bell tower of the Cologne City Hall where, since 6 July 2009, one of the Tierkreis melodies is played on the carillon daily at noon
- Composed: 1974–75
- Movements: 12
- Scoring: various versions

Tierkreis (1974–75) is a musical composition by the German composer Karlheinz Stockhausen. The title is the German word for Zodiac, and the composition consists of twelve melodies, each representing one sign of the zodiac.

== History ==
Once described as "melodic naïveté" in the form of "cheerful, empty-headed little tune[s]", who nevertheless soon changed his mind, Tierkreis has proved to be Stockhausen's most popular composition. Tierkreis was originally written for music boxes as a component part of a theater piece for percussion sextet titled Musik im Bauch (Music in the Belly), which has been interpreted variously as "a fairy tale for children" or else as "a ritual played out in Mexican Indian scenery". These twelve melodies (with or without their accompaniments) form an autonomous work which can be played by any suitable instrument, and exist also in versions to be sung. The striking simplicity of the melodies has led some writers to see them (together with other of Stockhausen's works from after 1966) as precursors of the German New Simplicity movement that began in the late 1970s.

On the initiative of the Committee for Art and Culture of the City Council of Cologne, from 6 July 2009 the melody from Tierkreis corresponding to the current Zodiac sign is played daily at noon on the newly restored 48-bell carillon in the tower of the Cologne City Hall as a tribute to the composer. Bert Augustus, a campanologist from the Dutch company Royal Eijsbouts programmed the melodies on a computer, with the collaboration of Suzanne Stephens and Kathinka Pasveer of the Stockhausen Foundation for Music.

== Form ==
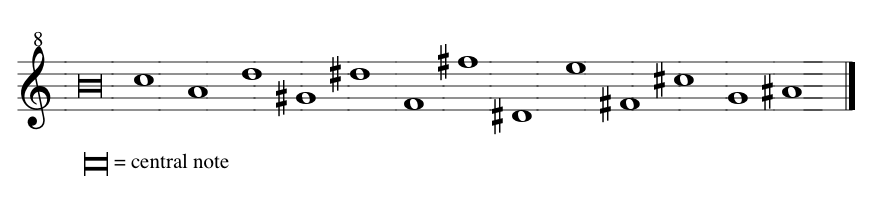
Fourteen-tone row of "Libra"

The twelve melodies of Tierkreis are character pieces, representing the twelve signs of the Zodiac. They are serial in conception and all are based on tone rows, though some have more than twelve notes—Libra, for example, has fourteen, with F♯ and D♯ recurring in different octaves. Because music boxes preclude any significant variation in dynamics or timbre, the structure of the Tierkreis melodies emphasize pitch and rhythm. Each melody is centered on a different chromatic pitch, with "Leo" (Stockhausen's own sign) = A, Virgo = A♯, Libra = B, Scorpio = C, etc., and each has its own distinctive tempo, chosen from the "chromatic" tempo scale first described in the composer's famous article, "... How Time Passes ...".

Like the pitches, the rhythms are also organized serially and strive for contrast amongst the melodies rather than relatedness (Kohl 1983, 150). Various scales of durations are employed: Fibonacci numbers (1, 2, 3, 5, 8, 13, ... ), arithmetic series (1, 2, 3, 4, 5, ... ), and "second order" arithmetic series, in which the difference between consecutive members increases arithmetically (2, 3, 5, 8, 12, 17, ... ). One melody, "Aries", mixes all three of these scale types, at different levels of the durational organization.

A complete performance begins with the melody corresponding to the zodiac sign within which the day of the performance falls, and proceeds through the twelve melodies of the cycle, ending with a return to the starting melody. Each melody is to be played at least three times through, with variations or improvisations, which in some performances have been very extensive. Though performances documented in recordings last between 12 and 63 minutes, a complete performing version by the violin-piano duo of Andrew and Gail Jennings is claimed to last 96 minutes, but they have declined to play their version complete in public. The melodies can also be played individually, or in smaller numbers.

In addition to Musik im Bauch, Stockhausen employed the Tierkreis melodies in the central "wheel" section of Sirius (1975–77), an hour-and-a-half-long chamber opera for soprano and bass voices, trumpet, bass clarinet, and eight-channel electronic music. Fragments of several of the melodies are also quoted in act 3, scene 1 of Donnerstag aus Licht, in part three ("Starry Sky") of the third Light Composition, where the signs of the zodiac are shown, one after the other, in the night sky.

Stockhausen also prepared a number of versions for various specific forces: vocal versions for five different voice ranges (high soprano or high tenor, Nr. 41 2/3; soprano or tenor, Nr. 41 3/4; mezzosoprano, alto, or low tenor, Nr 41 4/5; baritone, Nr. 41 5/6; bass, Nr. 41^{6}/_{7} all 1975), version for chamber orchestra, Nr. 41 ^{7}/_{8} (1977), version for clarinet and piano, Nr. 41^{8}/_{9} (1981), a "trio version" for clarinet, flute/piccolo, and trumpet/piano, Nr. 41^{9}/_{10} (1983), a "version 2003" for soprano or tenor with chording instrument, Nr. 41 ^{10}/_{11} (2003), and, finally, two orchestral versions of five melodies each, titled Fünf Sternzeichen, Nr. 41^{11}/_{12}, and Fünf weitere Sternzeichen, N. 41^{12}/_{13}. The latter was his last completed composition, finished on 4 December 2007, the night before he died. Stockhausen was planning further work in January 2008, which was probably the orchestration of the remaining two pieces, "Cancer" and "Leo".

== Discography ==
- Allar Kaasik, tšello: A. Pärt, A. Ellerhein-Metsala, K. Stockhausen.Version for cello and organ. Allar Kaasik, cello; Ines Maidre, organ. LP, Melodiya C10 28381 000.
- Assolo. Version for clarinet (and bass clarinet) solo. Massimo Munari, clarinet and bass clarinet. CD Lanner Edizioni.
- Blaise Calame: Bartók, Stockhausen, Berio. Version for violin solo. Blaise Calame, violin. LP, Pavane Records ADW 7142.
- Bühler Flötenkreis: Miniaturen aus vier Jahrhunderten. Version for recorder ensemble. LP, Gema A-4979.
- The Contemporary Lute. Version for two lutes. Peter Söderberg and Sven Åberg, lutes. Alice Musik Production CD ALCD 004
- The Contemporary Solo Double Bass, version for solo double bass. Bjørn Ianke (double bass) CD Simax PSC 1039.
- Duo version of melodies 3, 4, 6, 7, and 11, for guitar and electric guitar. Gilles Ballet, guitar; Patrick Brun, electric guitar. CD Cybelia CY 1127.
- Gidon Kremer: LP, Ariola-Eurodisc 201 234–405. Version of six of the melodies ("Aquarius", "Pisces", "Aries", "Cancer", "Leo", "Sagittarius", and "Aquarius" (reprise)) for solo violin. Gidon Kremer, violin. Also released on DENON 28CO-1862.
- Giuliano Rizzotto: Bone Zone. Version for trombone solo. Giuliano Rizzotto, trombone. CD L'Eubage 5.
- Historical Russian Archives: Gidon Kremer Edition. Version of six of the melodies ("Aquarius", "Gemini", "Pisces", "Libra", "Sagittarius", "Leo", and "Aquarius" (reprise)) for violin solo and two violins. Gidon Kremer and Tatiana Grindenko, violins. 10-CD set. Brilliant Classics 8712. Also released on Russian Legends: Legendary Russian Soloists of the 20th Century. 100-CD set, Brilliant Classics 8173. Reissued on The Russian Archives: Gidon Kremer Plays 20th-Century Composers. 3-CD set. Brilliant Classics 9242. N.p.: Brilliant Classics, 2011.
- Incontri/Encounters. Version for guitar of "Aquarius", "Leo", and "Libra". Piero Bonaguri, guitar. CD Phoenix Classics PH 00617.
- J. S. Bach: Partitas; K. Stockhausen: "Zodiac". Version for violin solo of six of the melodies. Rony Rogoff, violin. 2 LPs, CBS/Sony 50AC 1188-9.
- Jean-Guy Boisvert: Zodiac. Version for clarinet and piano. Jean-Guy Boisvert, clarinet; Louise-Andree Baril, piano. CD SNE 586.
- Kamikaze Ground Crew: Covers. Two melodies, "Capricorn" and "Leo". Doug Wieselman, clarinets, saxophones, guitar, balalaika, organ; Gina Leishman, saxophones, bass clarinet, accordion, vocals; Steven Bernstein, trumpet, slide trumpet; Peter Apfelbaum, tenor and soprano saxophones; Art Baron, trombone; Marcus Rojas, tuba; Kenny Wollesen, drums. CD, Koch Records, Koch Jazz 7882.
- Karlheinz Stockhausen Piano Music. Version for piano solo. Elisabeth Klein, piano. CD TIM Scandinavian Classics 220555. Also released on Classico CLASSCD 269.
- Karlheinz Stockhausen: Tierkreis. Bruno Heinen Sextet (Bruno Heinen, piano; Filvio Sigurta, trumpet; Janes Allsopp, bass clarinet; Tom Challenger, saxophone; Andrea Di Biase, bass; Jon Scott, drums). CD Babel Label BDV13119. London: Babel Label Records, 2013.
- Karlheinz Stockhausen: Tierkreis—Melodies des douze signes celestes (improvisations autour du zodiaque). Pascal Lefeuvre, vielle a roue electro-acoustique, Erik Baron, basse fretless & bow basse. CD Alba Musica Musidisc MU 245 202
- Karlheinz Stockhausen: Tierkreis; Oberlippentanz. Markus Stockhausen, trumpet and piano; Kathinka Pasveer, flute; Suzanne Stephens, clarinet (recorded 1985). CD Acanta 43201; LP Acanta 23531.
- Karlheinz Stockhausen: Tierkreis/Zodiac. Dominik Susteck, organ (recorded 30 September 2008, Kunst-Station Sankt Peter, Cologne) Cologne. CD Wergo WER 67362. Mainz: Wergo, 2011.
- Katerina Zlatinikova Zymbal-Musik vol.2. Version for flute(s) and cimbalom. Katerina Zlatnikova, cimbalom; Willy Freivogel, Stephan Zilka, Elisabeth Deinhard, flutes; Gerhard Braun, recorder. CD Podium POD WOW-008-2.
- Knut Sönstevold plays Stockhausen. Version for bassoon and piano. Knut Sönstevold, bassoon; Kina Sönstevold, piano. CD Nosag 42.
- Live in Berlin: Accroche Note. Ensemble Accroche-Note (Armand Angster, contrabass clarinet, bass clarinet, clarinet; Françoise Kubler, voice, melodica, percussion; Emmanuel Séjourné, vibraphone, marimba, percussion; Benoît Dunoyer de Segonzac: double bass; Abdellatif Chaarani, darbuka, bendir, tar, chimes). CD, Free Music Production FMPCD 083.
- Music For Two: Neue Musik für Blockflöte und Gitarre. Version for recorder and guitar of four pieces ("Aquarius", "Gemini", "Virgo", and "Capricorn"). Hans-Martin Linde, recorder; Konrad Ragossnig, guitar. CD, Wergo 60142-50.
- Musik mit Schlaginstrumenten 3. Six melodies ("Capricorn", "Aquarius", "Pisces", "Taurus", "Libra", "Leo"), arr. Gabriel Bouchet for percussion ensemble. Ecole des Percussions de Strasbourg; Christian Hamouy, cond. LP, Sound-Star-Ton SST 0184.
- Oberlippentanz; Ave; Tierkreis, Trio-Version. Markus Stockhausen, trumpet and piano; Kathinka Pasveer, flute; Suzanne Stephens, clarinet (recorded 1991). CD, Stockhausen Complete Edition 35.
- Piccolo XX. Version for unaccompanied piccolo. Roberto Fabbriciani, piccolo. CD Arts 47557.
- Stockhausen Tierkreis: Zodiac. Two different versions for bass clarinet, trombone, accordion, drums, cello and double bass. Michael Riessler, bass clarinet; Mike Svoboda, trombone; Stefan Hussong accordion; Michael Kiedaisch, drums; Scott Roller, cello; Wolfgang Fernow, double bass. CD Wergo 66592
- Stockhausen: Bass Clarinet and Piano. Version for bass clarinet and piano. MDG 613-1451Volker Hemken, bass clarinet; Steffen Schleiermacher, piano (with toy piano and music box).
- Stockhausen: In Freundschaft for oboe; Linker Augentanz; Taurus; Taurus-Quintett; Kamel-Tanz; Rotary-Bläserquintett. Edurne Santos, bassoon (in Taurus, recorded 10 December 2011 at Sound Studio N, Cologne); Ensemble Musikfabrik: Melvyn Poore, tuba; Marco Blaauw, trumpet; Heidi Mockert, bassoon; Christine Chapman, horn; Bruce Collings, trombone (in Taurus-Quintett, recorded 22 May 2015 at Sound Studio N, Cologne). CD recording, 1 disc: digital, 12 cm, stereo. Stockhausen Complete Edition CD 105. Kürten: Stockhausen-Verlag, 2015.
- Stockhausen: Jubiläum für Orchester; Tierkreis: Zehn Sternzeichen für Orchester; Tierkreis für das historische Glockenspiel des Kölner Rathauses. BBC Symphony Orchestra, cond. Oliver Knussen (Jubiläum). Orchestra Mozart (Bologna), cond. Oliver Knussen (Tierkreis for orchestra); Cologne Town Hall Carillon, programmed by Bert Augustus (adaptation of a version of Tierkreis by Kathinka Pasveer and Suzanne Stephens). Stockhausen Complete Edition CD 100. Kürten: Stockhausen-Verlag, 2010.
- Stockhausen: Musik für Klarinette, Baßklarinette, Bassetthorn: Suzee Stephens spielt 15 Kompositionen. Includes version of Tierkreis for clarinet and piano. Suzanne Stephens, clarinet; Majella Stockhausen, piano. 3-CD set, Stockhausen Complete Edition 32 A-B-C.
- Stockhausen: Musik im Bauch. Les Percussions de Strasbourg. Includes complete Tierkreis on music boxes. LP, DG 2530 913. Also released on CD, Stockhausen Complete Edition 24.
- Stockhausen: Tierkreis. Version for clarinet and piano. Jean-Phillipe Vivier, clarinet; Tamayo Ikeda, piano. CD Solstice SOCD 197.
- Tétraclavier. Version for piano and celesta of two pieces ("Scorpio" and "Pisces"). Jean-Jacques Dünki, piano; Pierre Sublet, celesta. CD Jecklin szene sCHweiz JS 289-2.
- Tierkreis. Version for violin with various instrumental accompaniments. Ivan Zenaty, violin; Jiri Mazanek, sitar; Daniel Mikolásek, vibraphone, crotales, marimba & bells; Josef Hála. piano, celesta & harpsichord; Pavel Dreser, accordion; Rudolf Dašek, guitar; Ales Bárta, organ; Jana Boušková, harp. ARTA Records, Prague F1 0030-2.
- Tierkreis: Schlagwerk Nordwest Percussion Ensemble spielt Karlheinz Stockhausen, Axel Fries. CD recording. Antes Edition BM-CM 31.9210. Bühl: Bella Musica Edition, 2007.
- Tierkreis; Vision; Die 7 Lieder Der Tage. Version for tenor and synthesizer. Hubert Mayer, tenor; Antonio Pérez-Abellán, synthesizer; Karlheinz Stockhausen, sound projection. CD, Stockhausen Complete Edition 77.
- 12 × 12 – A Musical Zodiac: Karlheinz Stockhausen: Tierkreis; Ars Nova & Ars Subtilior. Capilla Flamenca and Het Collectief. Recorded at Campus of the Arts "deSingel", Antwerp, October 2010. CD recording. Etcetera/Klara KTC 4042. [The Netherlands]: Coda BVBA, 2012.
- Version for marimba/vibraphone and piano. Johan Eriksson, marimba and vibraphone; Johan Fröst, piano. CD Tingshuset Musik CMCD 003.
- Zeit(t)räume: Karlheinz Stockhausen, Luciano Berio. Includes Tierkreis for soprano and piano. Claudia Böttcher, soprano; Jovita Zähl, piano. Recorded February 2012 at Loft, Cologne. CD recording. Wergo WER 6749 2. Mainz: Wergo, 2013.
