= Christophe Bertrand =

French composer (1981–2010)

Christophe Louis-Pascal Bertrand (24 April 1981 – 17 September 2010) was a French composer of contemporary classical music.

== Biography ==
Bertrand, a French pianist and composer of mainly chamber works, was born in Wissembourg in 1981. After earning gold medals for piano and chamber music at the Conservatoire de Strasbourg, he performed and recorded with the Ensemble "Accroche-Note" and the Ensemble "In Extremis" of which he was a co-founder. He collaborated with composers such as Ivan Fedele and Pascal Dusapin.

He studied composition since 1996, under the supervision of Ivan Fedele at the Strasbourg Conservatoire, obtaining with distinction his diploma in 2000.

His compositions, conducted among others by Pierre Boulez, Jonathan Nott, Hannu Lintu, Marc Albrecht have been performed by several ensembles and soloists such as the Ensemble Intercontemporain, Arditti Quartet and the Orchestre philharmonique de Strasbourg.

His compositions have been played internationally, amongst others in:

- France: Festival Musica, IRCAM, Festival d'Aix-en-Provence, Festival Agora, Centre Georges Pompidou, Salle Olivier Messiaen de la Maison de Radio France, etc.
- Germany: Beethovenfest Bonn, Ultraschall-Festival à Berlin, Internationale Ferienkurse in Darmstadt, Mitteldeutscher Rundfunk
- Switzerland: Lucerne Festival
- Belgium: Ars Musica in Brussels
- Italy: Festival Traiettorie in Parma, Rondo-Milano, Spoleto Festival
- The Netherlands: Gaudeamus Festival in Amsterdam
- The USA (San Francisco), in the United Kingdom (Manchester), in Slovenia (Ljubljana)

French radio channel France Musique provided his compositions airtime (broadcasting).

He died by suicide in September 2010 in Strasbourg, where he also lived.

== Awards ==
- Prix de la Musique de l'Académie des Marches de l'Est (2001)
- Earplay Prize (2002)
- SACEM Hervé Dugardin prize (2007)
- André Caplet prize (2007)

He was selected by the Académie française in Rome to be in residence at the Villa Médicis in Rome for 18 months.

== Works ==
Illya
1996
Solo flute (4')
Trois Arcanes
1996–1997
Flute in C (6')
Misty Dawn
1997
Flute, clarinet, percussion and piano (5')
Et je sus que j'étais la lune
1998
Alto flute (6')
Soap Opera
1998
Solo cello (5')
Skiaï
1998–1999
Five instruments (8')
To Pierre-Yves Meugé
World premiere: 11/05/1999 – Strasbourg, Musée de l'Œuvre Notre-Dame – Ensemble du Conservatoire de Strasbourg
Strofa II
1998
Female voice, violin and piano (5'30)
World premiere: 11/05/2000 – Strasbourg, Oratoire du Temple-Neuf – Ensemble du Conservatoire de Strasbourg
Strofa IIb
1998–2000
Female voice, alto flute (+ flute in C) and piano (5'30)
World premiere: 02/07/2000 – Wangen (67), Vieux Freihof – Aline Metzinger (voice), Olivier Class (fl), Christophe Bertrand (pno)
La Chute du Rouge
2000
Clarinet, cello, vibraphone and piano (11')
To Ivan Fedele
World premiere: 11/05/2000 – Strasbourg, Oratoire du Temple-Neuf – Ensemble du Conservatoire de Strasbourg
Treis
2000
Violin, cello and piano (10')
Honorable mention at the Gaudeamus Festival 2001 / First Prize Earplay 2002
To Rosalie Adolf, Anne-Cécile Litolf and Godefroy Vujicic
World premiere: 07/10/2000 – Strasbourg, Musica Festival
Dikha
2000–2001
Clarinet/bass clarinet and electronics (9'30)
Composed during the "Cursus de composition et d'informatique musicale" at the IRCAM
To Pierre Dutrieu
World premiere: 15/06/2002 – Paris, Agora Festival, Espace de Projection de l'IRCAM – Pierre Dutrieu, clarinet
Ektra
2001
Solo flute (5')
To Olivier Class
World premiere: 16/06/2001 – Strasbourg, Cercle européen, Académie des Marches de l'Est – Olivier Class, flute
Full
2001
Four vibraphones, piano and eight amplified voices (15')
Commissioned by Les Percussions de Strasbourg
To Odile Charvet and the École des Percussions de Strasbourg
World premiere: 20/01/2002 – Strasbourg, La Laiterie – Les Percussions de Strasbourg
Yet
2002
20 musicians (10')
Commissioned by Ensemble Intercontemporain
World premiere: 29/09/2002 – Strasbourg, Musica Festival – Ensemble Intercontemporain, dir. Jonathan Nott
Haos
2003
Solo piano (10')
Commissioned by Festival Rendez-vous Musique Nouvelle, Forbach, to Laurent Cabasso
World premiere: 09/11/2003 – Forbach, Festival RVMN – Raoul Jehl, piano
Iôa
2003
8-part female choir (3')
To Catherine Bolzinger
World premiere: 23/05/2003 – Strasbourg, Palais du Rhin – Ensemble Vocal Féminin du Conservatoire de Strasbourg, dir. Catherine Bolzinger
Aus
2004
Viola, soprano saxophone, clarinet (+ bass clarinet) and piano (8')
Commissioned by Radio Berlin-Brandenburg
To Philippe Hurel
World premiere: 24/01/2004 – Berlin, Ultraschall-Festival – Ensemble Intégrales
Virya
2004
Flute, clarinet (+ bass clarinet), percussion and piano (7')
Commissioned by Francis Rueff
World premiere: 19/03/2004 – Espace 110 Illzach – Ensemble In Extremis
Mana
2004–2005
Large orchestra (10')
Commissioned by Lucerne Festival
To Pierre Boulez
World premiere: 09/09/2005 – Lucerne KKL – Lucerne Festival Academy Orchestra, dir. Pierre Boulez
Madrigal
2004–2005
Female voice and ensemble (11')
Commissioned by the André Boucourechliev Foundation
World premiere: 30/09/2005 – Strasbourg, Festival Musica – Accroche-Note
Quatuor I
2005–2006
String quartet (20')
Co-commissioned by Beethovenfest Bonn and Peter McBurney
To the Arditti Quartet
World premiere: 19/03/2006 – Brussels, Ars Musica Festival – Arditti Quartet
Sanh
2006
Bass clarinet, cello and piano (11')
Commissioned by French Ministry of Culture
World premiere: 11/10/2007 – Strasbourg, Musica Festival / Accroche-Note
Arashi
2007
Solo viola (6')
To Thomas Monod
World premiere: 29/02/2008 – Strasbourg, Mamcs – Thomas Monod, viola
Vertigo
2006–2007
2 pianos and orchestra (20')
Co-commissioned by French Ministry of Culture and Musica Festival
World premiere: Musica Festival 2008
Hendeka
2007
Violin, viola, cello and piano (13')
Kamenaia
2008
12 solo voices (6')
Commissioned by Ensemble Musicatreize
Dall'Inferno
2008
Flute, viola and harp (10')
Satka
2008
Flute, clarinet, violin, cello, percussion and piano (13')
Commissioned by Festival d'Aix-en-Provence
Diadème
2008
Soprano, clarinet and piano (9')
Commissioned by Ensemble Accroche-Note
Haïku
2008
Piano (6')
Scales
2008–2009
Large ensemble (20')
Arka
2010
Soprano, horn, violin and piano
Quatuor II
2010
String quartet (11')
Ayas
2010
Brass and percussion (3')
Okhtor
2010
Large orchestra (15')

== Discography ==
- La Chute du rouge (2015) – Motus
- Christophe Bertrand — Écrits, entretiens, analyses et témoignages, ed. Olivier Class (2015) – Éditions Hermann (book)
- Solo Clarinet (2016) – Triton, Armand Angster (clarinet)
- Trio catch : Sanh (2017) – Col Legno
- L'intégrale de la musique instrumentale (2020) – Bastille Musicale
- L'oiseau rebelle (2021) – B Records, Mikhail Bouzine (piano)
- Lumières (2026) – Hortus, Lions Gate Trio
