= François-Bernard Mâche =

French composer of contemporary music (born 1935)

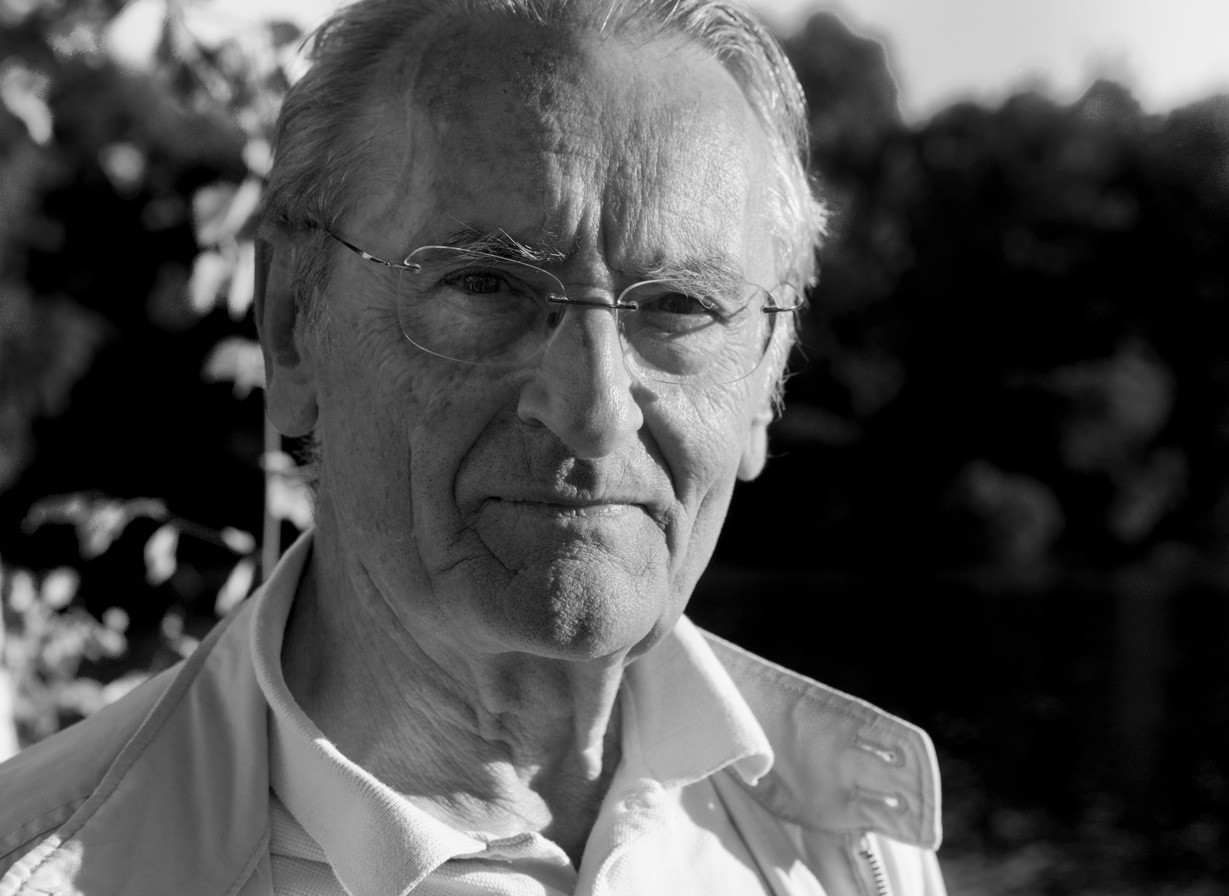
François-Bernard Mâche

François-Bernard Mâche (born 4 April 1935, Clermont-Ferrand) is a French composer of contemporary music.

== Biography ==
Born into a family of musicians, he is a former student of Émile Passani and Olivier Messiaen and has also received a diploma in Greek archaeology (1957) and a teaching certificate (Agrégation de Lettres classiques, 1958). He was a member of the Groupe de Recherches Musicales in Paris from 1958–63. He has composed electroacoustic, orchestral, chamber, choral, vocal and piano works. He has been a member of the Académie des Beaux-Arts since 2002 and occupies the chair of the late Iannis Xenakis.

Mâche's Music, Myth and Nature, or The Dolphins of Arion (Musique, mythe, nature, ou les Dauphins d'Arion) (1983, 1992 ISBN 3-7186-5321-4), which as a whole argues for a return in composition to mythic thought, includes a study of "ornitho-musicology" using a technique of Nicolas Ruwet's Langage, musique, poésie (1972) paradigmatic segmentation analysis, shows that birdsongs are organized according to a repetition-transformation principle. One purpose of the book was to “begin to speak of animal musics other than with the quotation marks”, and he is credited by Dario Martinelli with the creation of zoomusicology.

The book also describes the conception and composition of pieces by Mâche, where, "As a starting point, he borrows a tonal model from reality which he then submits to a highly intricate process leading to abstraction." This technique leads Daniel Durney to describe Mâche as "one of the rare exponents of the naturalistic trend in music." Models often include human speech and bird song. Given the extensive use of birdsong made by Messiaen, Mâche avoided using birdsong recordings in his own work until 1969: Naluan for ensemble and tape from 1974, "systematically explores" the model of birds; while Sopiana of 1980 pits recordings of Malayan shamas, icterine warblers and marsh warblers against the virtuosity of a live flute and piano. Recordings of birdsong, insect sounds, and other natural phenomena such as raindrops are integrated into Le printemps du serpent for large percussion ensemble of 2001. Earlier in Mâche's composing career, recording of a poem by the modern Greek poet Giorgos Seferis, read by Mâche himself, formed the basis of the orchestral work La peau du silence (1962), and that of a text by Paul Éluard for Le son d'une voix for small orchestra in 1964.

Other major works include Kassandra for large ensemble and tape, which won the Italia Prize in 1977; Eridan (1986) and Moires (1994), both written for the Arditti Quartet; Kengir (1991), settings of ancient Sumerian love poems, and Manuel de résurrection (1998), setting texts from the Egyptian Book of the Dead, both written for the soprano Françoise Kubler and Ensemble "Accroche Note". Several of Mâche's works from the 1980s onwards make use of the sampling keyboard, notably L'estuaire du temps (1993) for sampler and large orchestra.

== Published books ==
- (as editor) Music, Society and Imagination in Contemporary France (1993) ISBN 3-7186-5421-0
- Musique, mythe, nature, ou les Dauphins d'Arion (Paris: Méridiens Klinksieck, 1983)
- Music, Myth and Nature: or, The Dolphins of Arion (Harwood Academic Publishers, 1992) (transl. from the French by Susan Delaney) ISBN 3-7186-5321-4
- Entre l'observatoire et l'atelier (Paris: Éditions Kimé, 1998)
- Un demi-siècle de musique... et toujours contemporaine (Paris: L'Harmattan, 2000)
- Musique au singulier (Paris: Éditions Odile Jacob, 2001)
- François-Bernard Mâche: de la musique, des languages, et des oiseaux: entretien (by Bruno Serrou). (Paris: Éditions Michel de Maule, 2007)

== Discography ==
- Styx, Lethe. Attacca Babel, 1994
- Styx, Areg, Mesarthim, Léthé, Nocturne. Naxos, 2006.
- Maraé, Aera, Khnoum, Le printemps du serpent. Accord, 2005.
- L'Estuaire du temps, Braises, Andromède. Densité 21, 2005.
- Kengir, Phénix, Brûlis, Figures, Aulodie. Assai, 2002.
- Manuel de résurrection, Kassandra, Sopiana, Amorgos, Moires. Musidisc, 1999.
- Aliunde, Phénix, Trois Chants Sacrés, Figures, Kemit, Aulodie. Erato, 1993.
