= Tierkreis =

Tierkreis is the German word for the Zodiac. It may also refer to:

- Suikoden Tierkreis, a Nintendo DS video game
- Tierkreis (Stockhausen), a German musical composition
