= Godefroy Vujicic =

Godefroy Vujicic (born 1975 in Paris) is a French classical cellist of Serbian descent.

== Biography ==
Born into a family of musicians (his father, Jezdimir Vujicic, was a violinist of Serbian origin, Godefroy Vujicic successively obtained two first prizes for cello and chamber music at the Versailles Conservatory, two first prizes "with distinction" in the same disciplines at the Royal Conservatory of Brussels then the higher education diploma of the Conservatoire de Paris.

He played for Europe Day in 1994, in trio with a Croatian pianist and a Bosnian violinist at the Odéon-Théâtre de l'Europe, aired live on Euronews. On this occasion, Jacques Delors, president of the European Commission, congratulated him for this "Exemplary understanding approach". He interpreted the complete six Cello Suites by Johann Sebastian Bach for the opening of the Festival du "Mois Molière" (2000 edition) in Versailles in commemoration of the 250th anniversary of the death of the composer, followed by a tour of radio and television concerts on national channels in the former Yugoslavia in Belgrade and Novi Sad. Vujicic took part to festivals, such as "Musica", in Strasbourg in 1999, broadcast on France Musique, "La fête à Voltaire" in Ferney-Voltaire in 2008, for the 230th anniversary of the death of Voltaire, and "Lille 3000", in 2009. Founder, conductor and cellist of the String Quartet of the French Army from 2001 to 2006, he was attached to the Chief of the Land Staff (Cemat). Cello solo at the premiere of the Clair ruisseau by Dmitri Shostakovich for the Bolchoi at the Paris Opera in 2004, Godefroy Vujicic was congratulated by Mstislav Rostropovich. He is a member of L'Ensemble Diagonal, dedicated to Contemporary classical music and conducted by Rut Schereiner and Luis Naón. Godefroy Vujicic played in cinema with the Concerts Colonne in Fauteuils d'orchestre (French film by Danièle Thompson, 2006), participated to the recording of the film score for Mangeurs d'étoiles (French film by Alice Colomer, 2008) and performed in Un baiser papillon (French film by Karine Silla, 2010).

Godefroy Vujicic is the founder of "Les concerts de l'abbaye royale Saint-Vincent" festival, which takes place annually at Senlis, in the Oise department.

He participated to the 11th edition of the Pierre Cardin festival, in Lacoste, in 2011, in the show "Voltaire, de la tolérance à la raison" (directed by Pierre-Marie Carlier).

He has been accompanying the Victoires de la Musique ceremony every year since 2011.

He recorded the six Suites for cello solo by Jean-Sébastien Bach, an album of Musiques russes at a concert in the Salle Cortot and the two Cello concertos by Joseph Haydn on the occasion of the bicentennial of the composer's death.

Godefroy Vujicic teaches at the Conservatory of Châtenay-Malabry (Hauts-de-Seine) and the Claude Debussy one in the 17th arrondissement of Paris.
