= Harlekin =

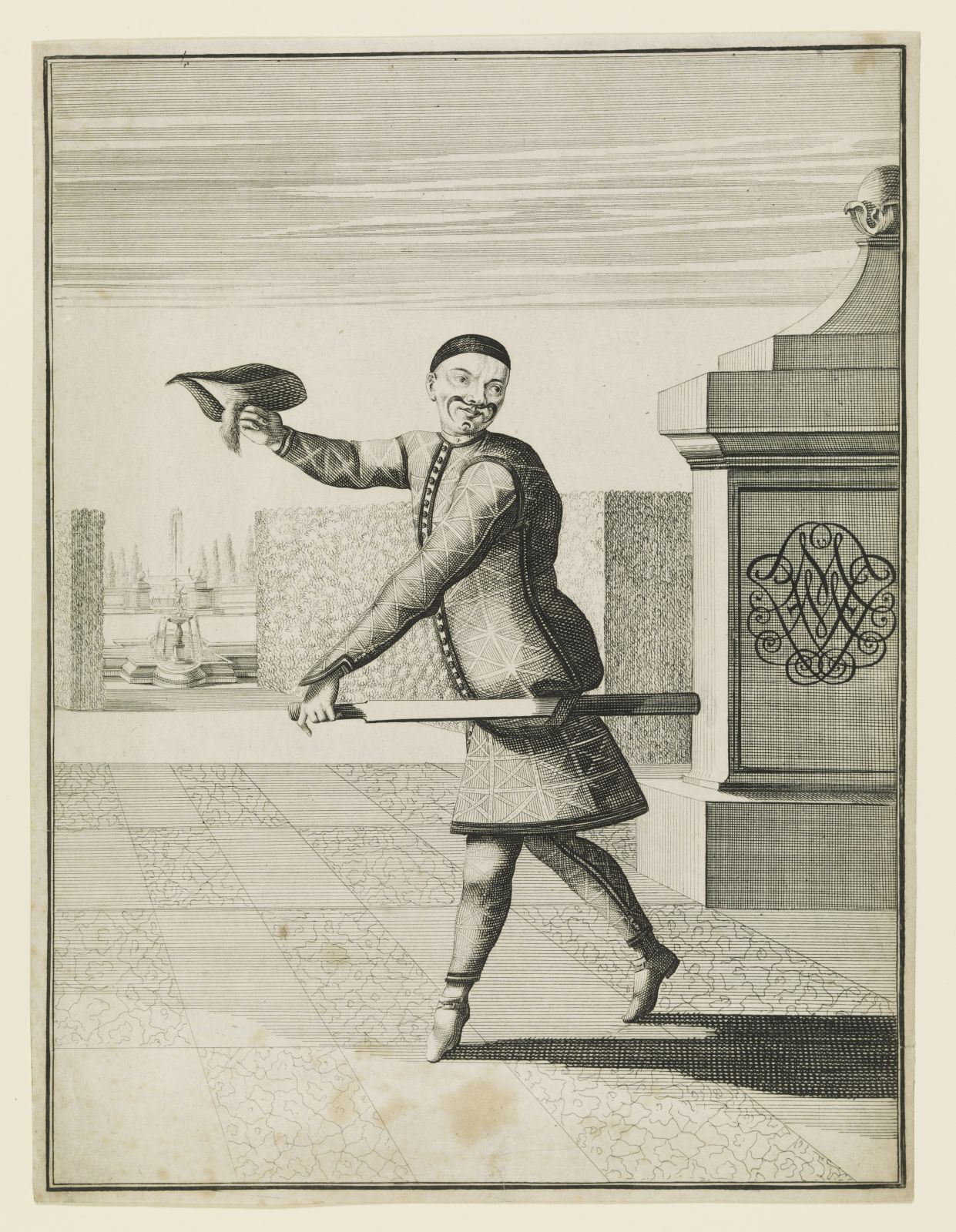
Harlequin in German itinerant theatre

Harlekin ('Harlequin') is a composition for unaccompanied clarinet by Karlheinz Stockhausen, named for the commedia dell'arte character Harlequin. It was composed in 1975 and is Number 42 in his catalogue of works. A shorter, derived work called Der kleine Harlekin is Number 42½.

== History ==
Harlekin was composed for the clarinetist Suzanne Stephens to dance to her own playing. It was begun at Easter 1975 in Morocco, and completed on Christmas Eve of the same year on Big Corn Island off the coast of Nicaragua. In an interview from October 1984, Stockhausen recalled the circumstances: "I can see it in front of me. A rocky shore with a small restaurant on it, and the timber house where I wrote most of HARLEKIN. I can see the oil that was poured on the floor to fight those horrid cockroaches". The work was premiered on 7 March 1976 in the Große Sendesaal of the WDR in Cologne by Suzanne Stephens. Although intended primarily for a dancing clarinetist, it can also be performed as "pure" music, in which case the notated dance rhythms are to be played on tabla, a Kandy drum, or similar drum. It may also be performed by a clarinetist at the side of the stage on which a dancer performs the choreography. There is an arrangement for flute, as well.

== Analysis ==
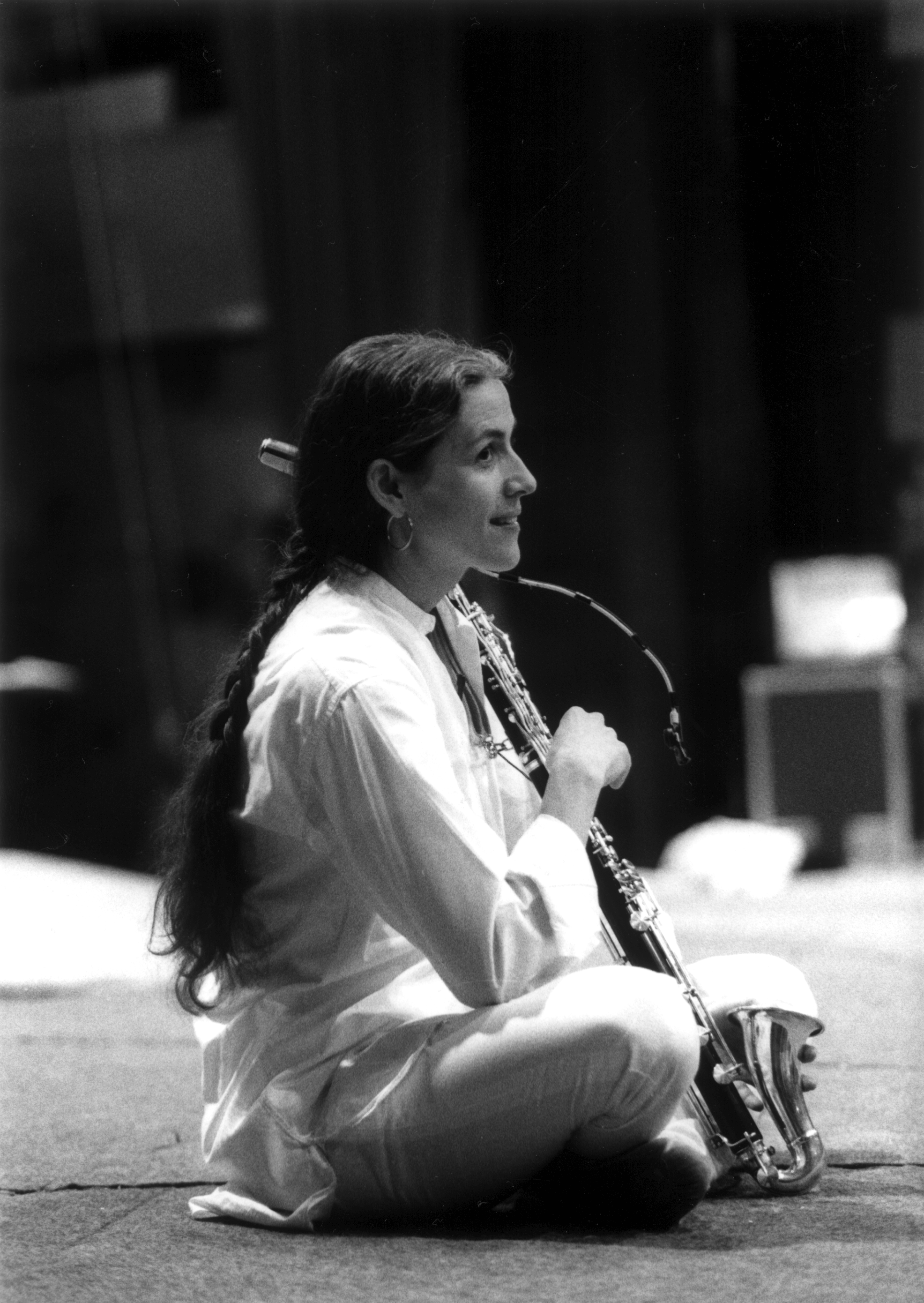
Suzanne Stephens, for whom Harlekin was written

Harlekin is composed using formula technique and falls into seven sections, which are played without a break:

1. Der Traumbote (The Dream Messenger)
2. Der spielerische Konstrukteur (The Playful Constructor)
3. Der verliebter Lyriker (The Enamored Lyric)
4. Der pedantische Lehrer (The Pedantic Teacher)
5. Der spitzbübische Joker (The Roguish Joker)
6. Der leidenschaftliche Tänzer (The Passionate Dancer)
7. Der exaltierte Kreiselgeist (The Exalted Spinning Spirit)

Part 6 is subdivided into two parts, titled "Dialog mit einem Fuß" (Dialog with a Foot) and "Harlekins Tanz" (Harlequin's Dance).

The whole work is composed as a single large wave. The work is based on a melodic formula first exposed in its full form in section 3, "Der verliebte Lyriker". Up to this point, the melody is gradually evolved, and from here onward it is composed out in a variety of ways. The cyclic compositional processes are associated with rotating movements by the performer, which recall the rotating movements of electronic sounds in Kontakte, and the improvised motions produced by use of the "sound mill" in the spherical auditorium of the German Pavilion at Expo '70 in Osaka. The duration is 45 min.

== Der kleine Harlekin ==
"Harlequin's Dance", the second subsection of part 6, became an independent piece with the title Der kleine Harlekin, and was given the work-number 42½. This piece was premiered by Suzanne Stephens on 3 August 1977 at the Centre Sirius in Aix-en-Provence. Like the parent composition, Der kleine Harlekin is meant for a dancing clarinetist, but can be performed as a duo by a clarinetist and a dancer, or a clarinetist and a drummer. It also has been arranged for flute.

== Discography ==
- Karlheinz Stockhausen: Harlekin; Der kleine Harlekin. Suzanne Stephens (clarinet). LP recording. DG 2531 006. [Hamburg]: Deutsche Grammophon, 1978. Reissued on CD, Stockhausen Complete Edition CD 25. Kürten: Stockhausen-Verlag, 1992.
- Karlheinz Stockhausen: Harlekin. Michele Marelli (clarinet). Stradivarius Times Future. CD recording. Stradivarius STR 33864. [Milan]: Stradivarius, 2010.
- Karlheinz Stockhausen: Amour, Der kleine Harlekin, Wochenkreis. Michele Marelli (clarinet and basset horn); Antonio Pérez Abellán (synthesizer, in Wochenkreis). Recorded in Cuneo, Italy, and Alicante, Spain, in March 2013. CD recording. Wergo WER 6785 2. Mainz: Wergo, 2013.

== Filmography ==
- Virtuoso: Müller—Paganini—Rossini—Stockhausen—Stravinsky. Matthias Müller (clarinet); Ensemble Zero, David Philip Hefti (cond.). 1 hybrid SACD + 2 DVDs (1 PAL and 1 NTSC), with video performances of Müller: Six Études de Concert and Stockhausen: Der kleine Harlekin. NEOS 20904. [Icking]: NEOS Music GmbH, 2009.
