= Armand Angster =

French clarinetist

Armand Angster (born 20 January 1947) is a French clarinetist. With Françoise Kubler (soprano), he is the founder of the ensemble "Accroche Note", research and creative formation in contemporary music.

== Career ==
Born in Strasbourg, Angster's mastery of the different clarinets (soprano, bass clarinet and metal doublebass) allows him to be the dedicatee of works by contemporary composers (Brian Ferneyhough, Ansioso quasi con gioia (2015) by Stefano Gervasoni, La mesure des choses I. La mesure de l'air (1992) by Joël-François Durand,) as well as their interpreter (Aleph (1985) by Philippe Manoury, Dikha by Christophe Bertrand, By the Way by Pascal Dusapin, Assonance III (1989) by Michael Jarrell).

In 1981, he created in Strasbourg with Françoise Kubler the Accroche Note ensemble offering programmes combining music from yesterday and today; this ensemble is supported in particular by the Ministry of Culture and the City of Strasbourg.

He is soloist in various formations ranging from the Orchestre philharmonique de Radio France, the Orchestre philharmonique de Strasbourg to ensembles of contemporary music in Europe (Nieuw Ensemble d'Amsterdam.)

He regularly takes part in the Musica Festival of Strasbourg and to numerous others (Europajazz Festival at Le Mans in 1989).

Angster teaches clarinet and chamber music at the Conservatoire de Strasbourg and at the Haute École des arts du Rhin in Strasbourg. Many of his students such as Manuel Metzger, and Jean-Francois Charles turned professionals.

He is recognized in the jazz world, notably thanks to the concerts and recordings in 1990 of the clarinet trio with Louis Sclavis and Jacques Di Donato, renowned improvisers and masters of the clarinet. He continues the trio experiment with new clarinetists, Sylvain Kassap and Jean-Marc Foltz in 2005.

== Awards ==
- Angster was made a Chevalier in the Ordre des Arts et des Lettres in 2012.

== Selected discography ==
Jazz

- Trio de clarinettes live with Jacques Di Donato, Louis Sclavis (FMP, 1991)
- L'ibère by Jean-Paul Celea and François Couturier's Passaggio (Label Bleu, 1994)
- Trio de clarinettes: Ramdam with Sylvain Kassap, Jean-Marc Foltz (Evidence, 2008)

Spectralism

- Inner Time II (live) by Armand Angster "Clarinet System" (Montaigne, 1994)

Chamber music

- Eco, composer Michael Jarrell, with the ensemble Accroche Notes (Accord, 2005)

Contemporary music

- La Chute d'Icare (premiere in 1988) for clarinet and ensemble, by Brian Ferneyhough (Etcetera KTC1070, 1988)
- Solo clarinet, world premiere works: Dikha (2001) by Christophe Bertrand, Sinolon (2000) by Alberto Posadas, High (2005) by Ivan Fedele and Art of Metal II (2007) by Yann Robin, solo pieces: Time and motion study I (1971-1977) by Brian Ferneyhough and Dal Niente (intérieur III) (1970) by Helmut Lachenmann (Triton, 2017)
