= Montag aus Licht =

Opera by Karlheinz Stockhausen

- Opera by Karlheinz Stockhausen
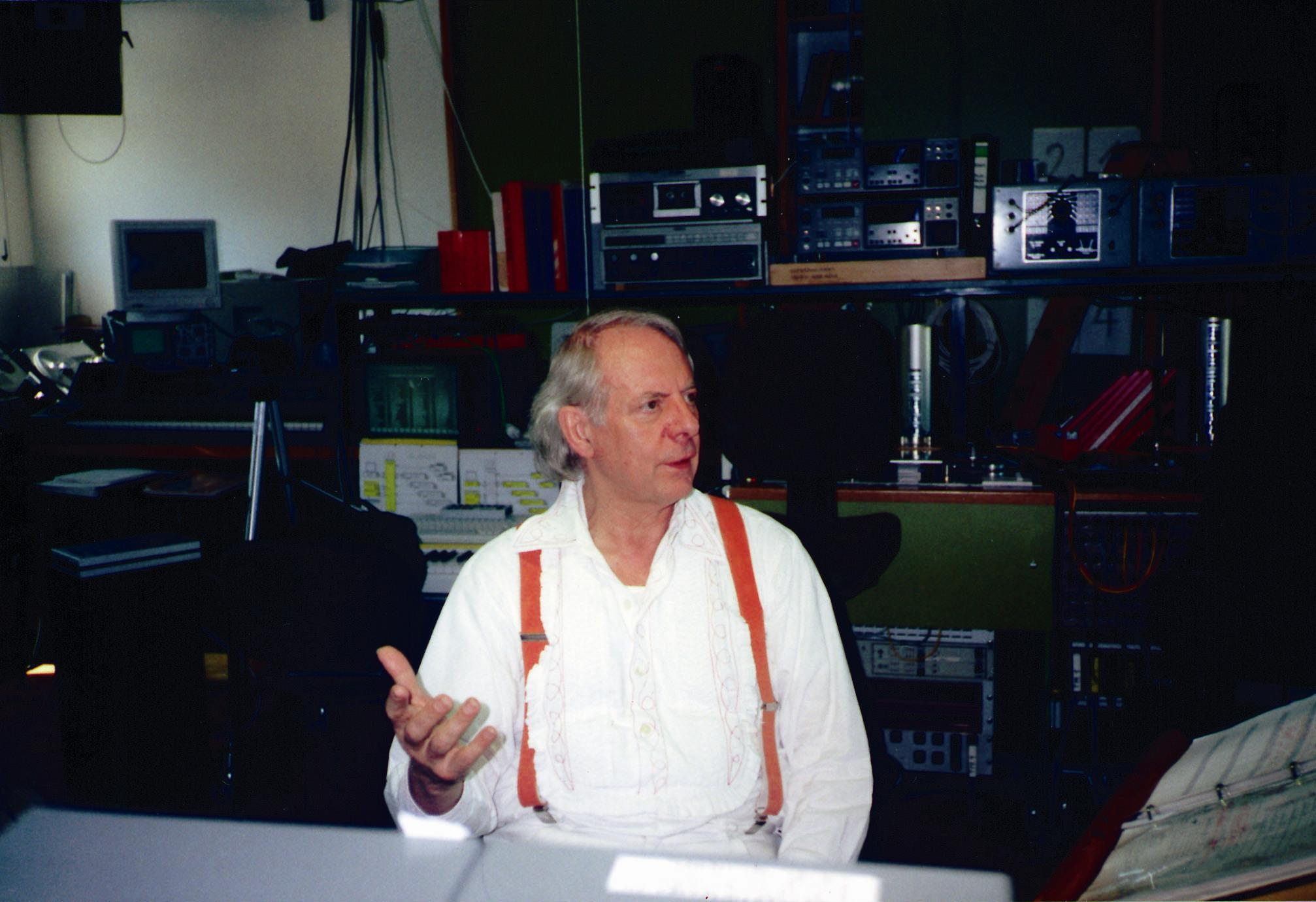
- Stockhausen in the WDR Studio for Electronic Music, 1996
- Librettist: Stockhausen
- Language: German
- Premiere: May 7, 1988; La Scala, Milan

Montag aus Licht (Monday from Light) is an opera by Karlheinz Stockhausen in a greeting, three acts, and a farewell, and was the third of seven to be composed for the opera cycle Licht: die sieben Tage der Woche (Light: The Seven Days of the Week). The libretto was written by the composer.

Montag is an opera for 21 solo performers (14 voices, 6 instrumentalists, and 1 actor) plus mimes, a mixed choir, children's choir, and "modern orchestra". It was composed between 1984 and 1988. Monday is Eve's day. Its exoteric colour is bright green; its esoteric colours are opal and silver.

== History ==
Montag was given its staged premiere by the Teatro alla Scala in Milan on 7 May 1988. Subsequent performances were on 8, 10, 11, 12, and 13 May. The stage direction was by Michael Bogdanov, sets by Chris Dyer, costumes by Mark Thompson. Karlheinz Stockhausen was the sound projectionist.

== Roles ==
Roles, voice types/performers, premiere cast
Role	Performer	Premiere cast
Eve (act 1)	three sopranos	Annette Meriweather, Donna Sarley, Jana Mrazova
Lucifer (act 1)	bass	Nicholas Isherwood
Luzipolyp (act 1)	bass and actor	Nicholas Isherwood, Alain Louafi
Three Sailors (act 1)	three tenors	Helmut Clemens, Julian Pike, Alastair Thompson
Coeur de Basset (acts 2 & 3)	basset horn	Suzanne Stephens
Budgerigar (act 2)	pianist	Pierre-Laurent Aimard
Monday Boy (act 2)	soprano	Gabriella Vakarcs
Tuesday Boy (act 2)	soprano	Attila Kudor
Wednesday Boy (act 2)	soprano	Patrik Pulinka
Thursday Boy (act 2)	soprano	Borbála Györi
Friday Boy (act 2)	soprano	Agnes Pintér
Saturday Boy (act 2)	soprano	Péter Kertész
Sunday Boy (act 2)	soprano	Gergely Hutás
Bassettinen (act 2)	2 basset horns and soprano	Rumi Sota, Nele Langrehr, Kathinka Pasveer
Pied Piper (act 3)	flautist	Kathinka Pasveer
Invisible Choir (act 1)	mixed choir	Choir of the West German Radio, Cologne
Animal-Children, Heinzelmännchen (act 1), Girls' Choir (act 2), Children (act 3)	children's choir	Children's Choir of Radio Budapest (Janos Remenyi, choir master)
Men and Women	choir	Zaans Kantatekoor (Jan Pasveer, choir master)

== Synopsis ==
Within the Licht cycle, the opera Monday focuses on the character of Eve, on the feminine side of existence, on birth. Monday is the day of the moon, lunae dies in Latin, and the moon has been traditionally associated with the feminine, in contrast to the sun, which was regarded as masculine. In myths and legends, it is a symbol of fertility, and veneration of the "lesser light" of the moon is a cult of the creative and productive power of nature, of the instinctive wisdom and shadowy perceptions that rule the night. The moon is also the demonic form of the feminine principle, the blind force of eclipse, of destruction, of primal fear, as personified in the Greek goddess Hecate, though Stockhausen avoids these aspects for his Eve in favour of positive, creative, and invigorating features. Montag is in three acts, with scenes and subscenes (called "situations" by the composer) as follows:

=== Montags-Gruß ===
The Monday Greeting is a tape composition played in the foyer as the audience arrives. The visual impression is of being underwater. The music is multilayered, made of stretched-out basset-horn sounds, occasionally mixed with the sounds of splashing and rushing water. Twelve photographs of the basset-horn player in different poses corresponding to the twelve pitches of the mirrored Eve formula surround the space.

=== Act 1: Evas Erstgeburt ===
In the first act, Eve's First Parturition, Eve is manifested in three sopranos who have many names. They sing constantly changing names for the Cosmic Mother from the cult of Inanna and from early Germanic cults, so that they are Eve in many forms. The act consists of six scenes.

==== Scene 1: In Hoffnung ====
The first scene, Expecting, opens on a multistory house with an inner courtyard lit by small green lamps. A terrace at the front ends at a huge Venetian blind. As night falls, the blind opens disclosing a sandy beach, with an indistinct, high tower at the left. High up in this tower, illuminated by a dim green light, stand three naked women. Groups of women with pails, cloths, sponges, baskets, and ladders approach, singing as they go. The moon rises, and the tower is seen to be a huge statue of a female figure, seated on the sand with her back to the terrace. The women begin to wash and anoint the statue, preparing Eve for a ceremony of celebration of birth. The music presents nine periodic cycles in which a musical formula gradually emerges.

==== Scene 2: Die Heinzelmännchen ====
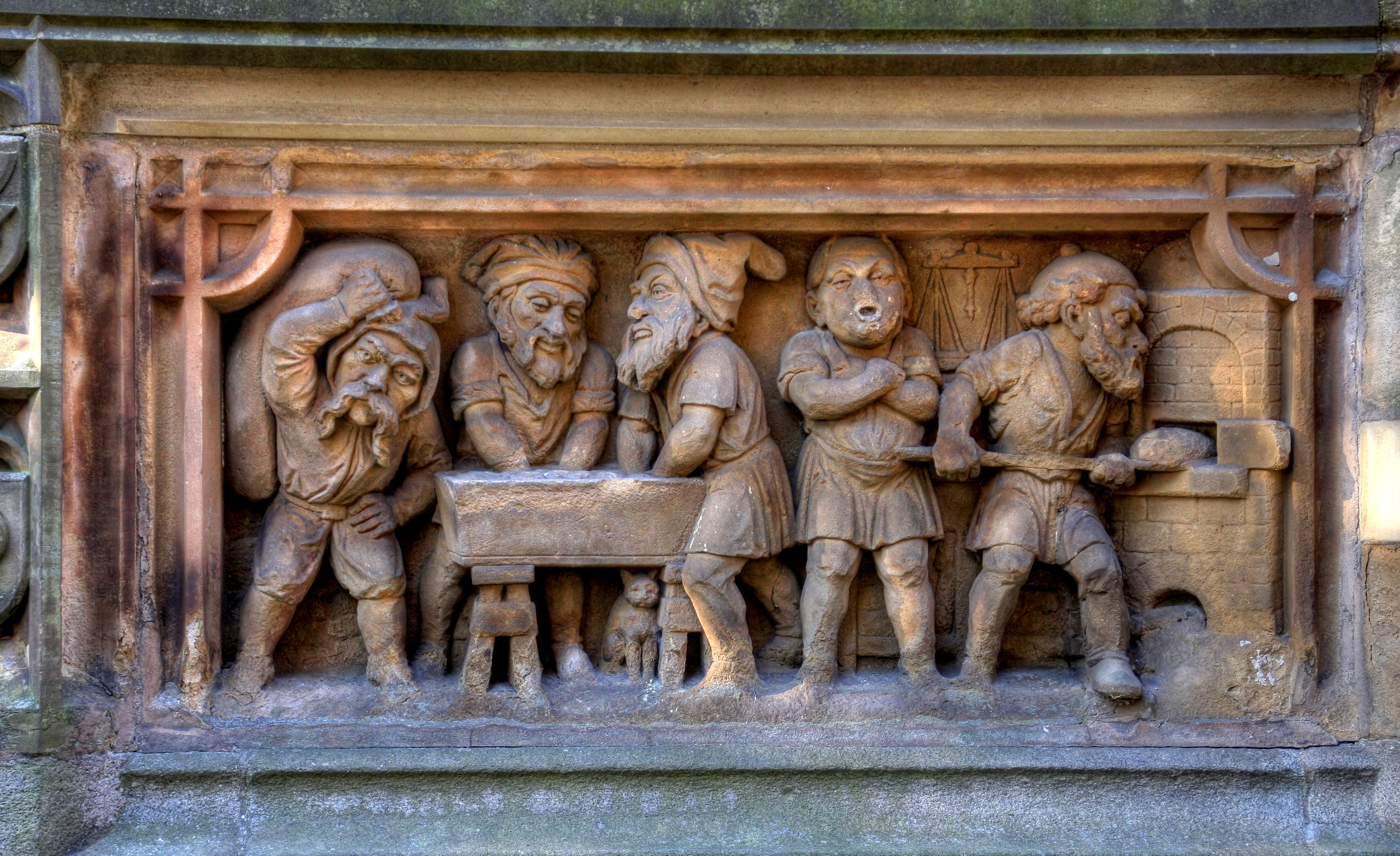
Detail of the Heinzelmännchen Fountain, Cologne

Heinzelmännchen are dwarf-like figures from an old Cologne folk tale, though this scene adopts only the humorous aspect from the legend. In this scene, Eve gives birth to a boys' choir. The three sopranos sing joyfully and very rapidly as the statue gives birth to a boy with a lion’s head, twins with swallows’ heads and wings, and so on.

==== Scene 3: Geburts-Arien ====
The three sopranos sing two Birth Arias as the Eve statue continues to produce children. During the first aria, a dark figure appears on the beach: it is Lucifer. As he approaches the newborn bodies, he hoots "Repulsive!" Everyone shrinks back, and Lucifer hurries out, As the seven newborn boys and seven newborn Heinzelmännchen (with beards and pointed hats, two of which are conjoined twins) struggle to rise from the sand, the three Eve sopranos sing a second aria.

==== Scene 4: Knaben-Geschrei ====
In Boys' Hullaballoo the boys are supposed to sing, but cannot. Instead, they just make strange noises and scream like babies.

==== Scene 5: Luzifers Zorn ====
In the fifth scene, Lucifer's Fury is directed at the deficient creatures who have been born, and he orders them all back into the womb. The whole process must be gone through again, because the first result was so ugly.

==== Scene 6: Das große Geweine ====
The Great Weeping is a general lament over Lucifer's decision to reject Eve's first-born, and is realised by a series of glissandos in the synthesizers and choir, which imitate sobbing and weeping.

=== Act 2: Evas Zweitgeburt ===
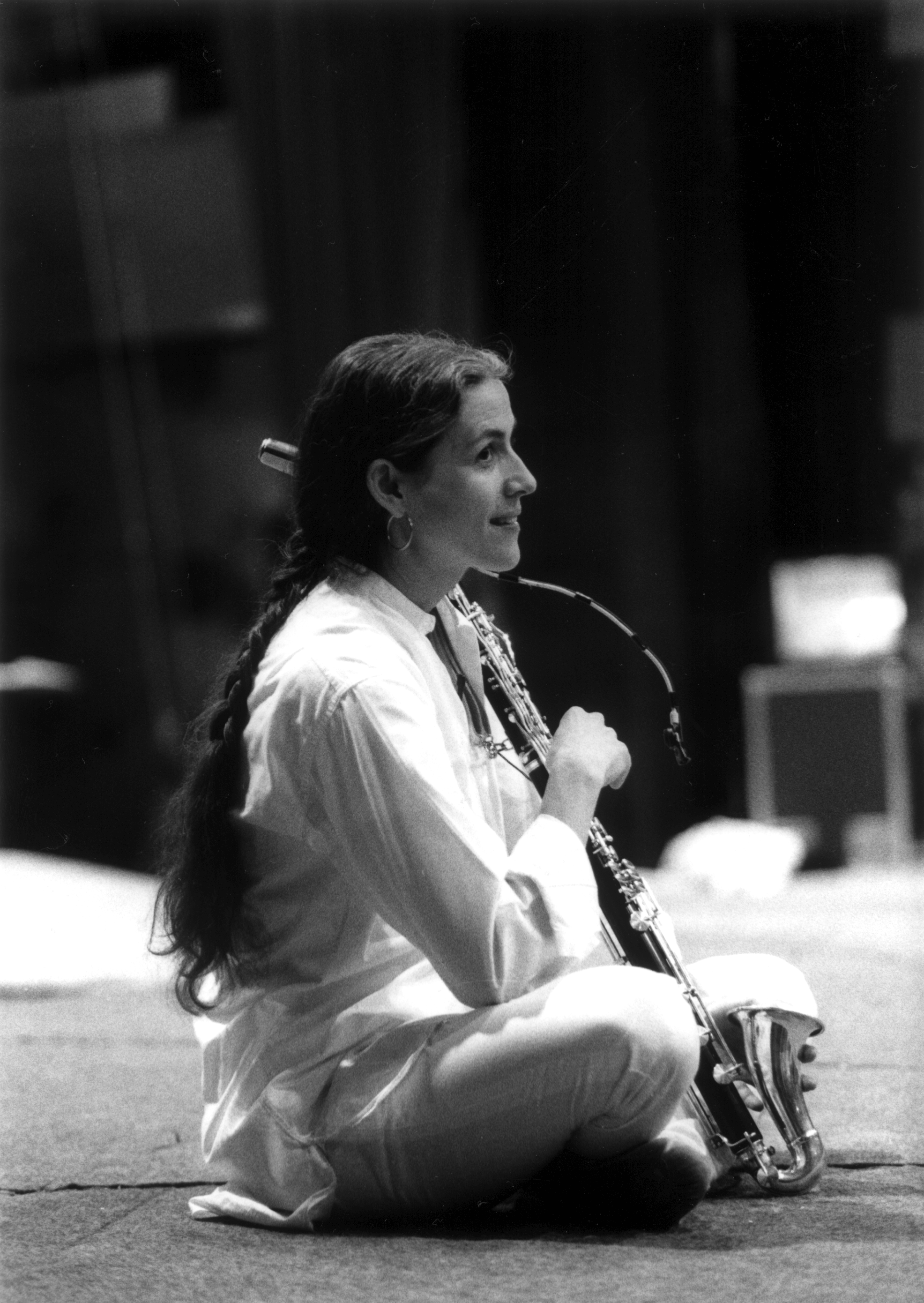
Suzanne Stephens during a rehearsal for Montag, Milan, May 1988

Eve's Second Parturition consists of three scenes.

==== Scene 1: Mädchenprozession ====
In the Girls' Procession, a choir of young girls, wearing dresses shaped like lilies, ceremonially enters bearing candles. The sea is now frozen, and women are hacking blocks of ice with axes, and melting the ice in cauldrons. The idea came from a ritual Stockhausen witnessed in Japan, in a valley near Kyoto, in which girls were carrying small lamps in a procession to a temple. This type of ceremony, with processions of torches, candles, or other forms of fire, is found as a fertility rite in many world traditions, such as the Egyptian Feast of Lamps for Osiris, the Greek and Roman rites of Hecate and Diana, respectively, and later in the Christian festival of torches on 15 August in honor of the Virgin Mary.

==== Scene 2: Befruchtung mit Klavierstück—Wiedergeburt ====
- Conception with Piano Piece. The women and girls call for a grand piano played by a budgerigar to inseminate the Eve statue for a second birth. The budgerigar plays Klavierstück XIV.
- Rebirth. To the singing of American Indian children, the piano is quickly pulled away and the statue's womb begins to glow, green and red, like a nativity scene. The sunlight returns, and seven boys are born, one for each weekday.

==== Scene 3: Evas Lied ====
Eve's Song is essentially a concerto for basset horn and synthesizers, against a background of the continuing boys' and girls' choirs from the preceding scenes, and trombones. It consists of a succession of four situations:

- Cœur de Basset emerges from the breast of the statue, playing a basset horn. The women melt large chunks of ice in steaming vats. With glass laboratory equipment, they condense the steam into water.
- In Wochenkreis (Cycle of the Week), Cœur de Basset teaches each of the boys the song of his weekday.
- Basset-Teases: the women put the water they have collected into watering cans and sprinkle the earth with it. Cœur de Basset divides into multiple basset-horn players, Busi, Busa, and Muschi. A transparent Eve figure emerges from the statue and floats toward the boys.
- Initiation. Cœur, Busi, Busa, and Muschi begin a dance, confusing and infatuating the boys. A distant thunderstorm is heard, and a boy calls, "Turn off the lights!" The lights go out.

=== Act 3: Evas Zauber ===
Eve's Magic is also divided into three scenes.

==== Scene 1: Botschaft ====
Message has a series of four situations.

- Evas Spiegel (Eve's Mirror). Eve, as Cœur de Basset, moves as in a dream over the fresh green lawn until she sees her reflection in the water-filled glassware. Fascinated by her mirror-image, she begins to play, as a male chorus appears and sings, "Mirror, mirror on the wall, who is fairest of them all?".
- Nachricht (News). Women rush in and report the news that a musicus with magic powers has arrived.
- Susani. The men sing to Eve, and the glass sculpture that mirrored Cœur de Basset bursts.
- In Ave, an alto-flute player dressed as a young man arrives. Eve and the flautist play a duet as the choir comments on their dialogue.

==== Scene 2: Der Kinderfänger ====
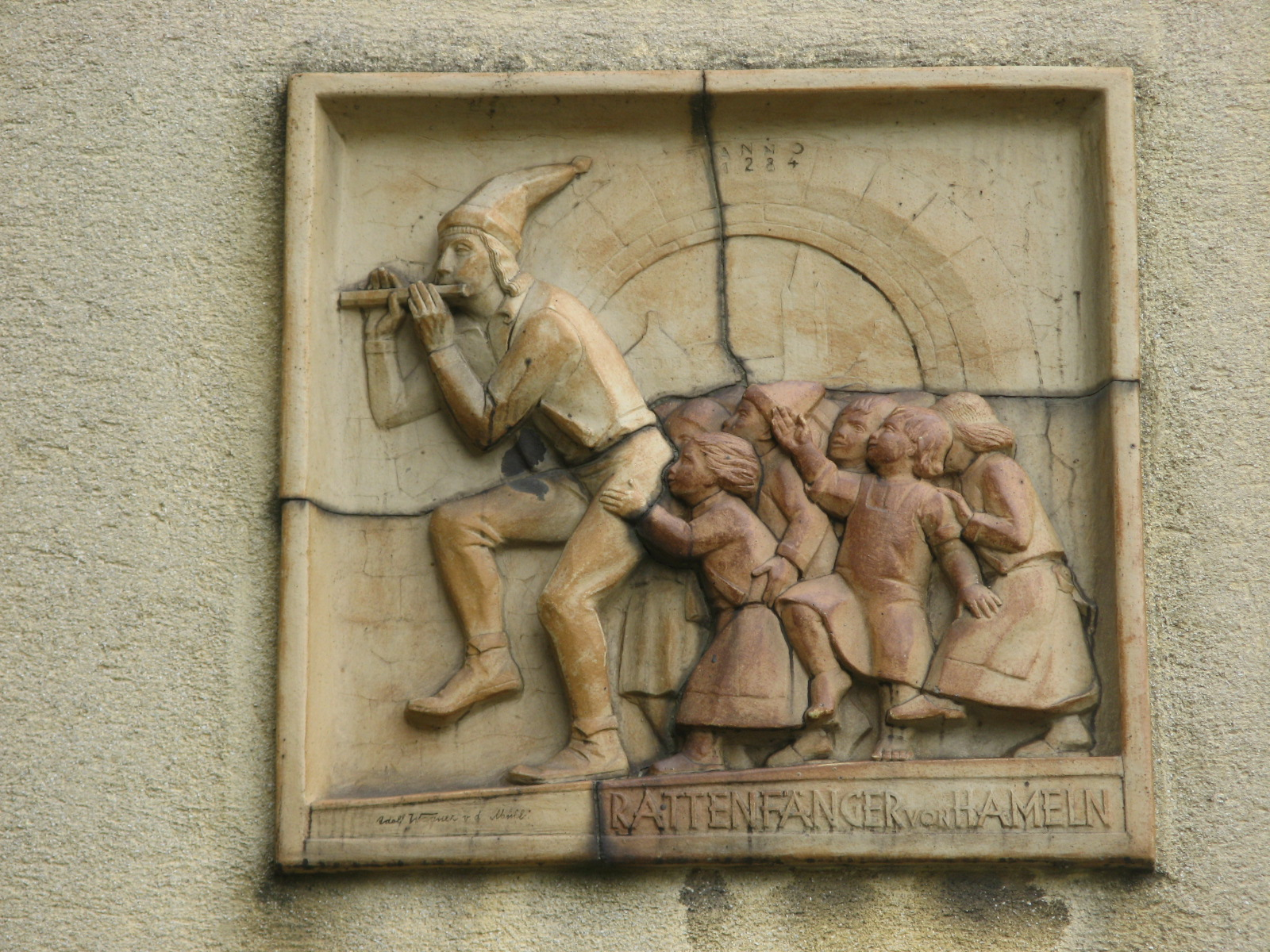
The Pied Piper

In The Pied Piper—originally titled Der Zauber (The Magic)—the musicus bewitches the children as Cœur, confused and disappointed, withdraws into the heart of the Eve statue. The adults, too, become frightened and shrink away against the walls and into the corners and watch as the Pied Piper enchants their children. It is a game of mimicry, in which the children try to imitate everything that the flute player demonstrates to them, accompanied by a rapid succession of sound-scenes from the real world. In the end, the Pied Piper dupes the children into removing their shoes and piling them up in a heap.

==== Scene 3: Entführung ====
In the final scene, Abduction, the Pied Piper, now playing a piccolo, leads the singing children off in ordered procession into the skies. As their voices become higher and higher in pitch, the Eve statue is transformed into a mountain (the "Evaberg"), sprouting trees, bushes, animals, and streams. The children are seen as giant white birds, circling higher and higher into the skies. Just before the end, one child come back out on stage, looks at the audience in astonishment and shouts, "Are you still here?" He then goes to the pile of shoes, finds his own and puts them on, observing, "It is very dirty outside", and darts away, as the children-bird voices continue to be heard in the distance.

=== Montags-Abschied ===
Monday's Farewell, like the greeting, is played back over four channels in the foyer as the audience leaves the theatre. The foyer is now wreathed in clouds, as the ever-rising voices of the children-birds circle around. Toward the end, a single voice sings: "The Eve-children have been abducted by music into higher worlds with green clouds".

== Discography ==
- Stockhausen: Montag aus Licht. Annette Meriweather, Donna Sarley, Jana Mrazova (soprano); Nicholas Isherwood (bass); Alain Louafi (actor); Helmut Clemens, Julian Pike, Alastair Thompson (tenors); Krisztina Veress, Menyhert Keri, Eszther Marshalko, Attila Botos, Eszther Szabados, Márta Benkó, Gergely Hutás (children's choir soloists); Suzanne Stephens, Rumi Sota, Nele Langrehr (basset horns); Kathinka Pasveer (voice and flute); Pierre-Laurent Aimard (piano); Michael Obst, Simon Stockhausen (synthesizers); Michael Svoboda (synthesizer and trombone); Andreas Boettger (percussion); Choir of the West German Radio, Cologne, Karlheinz Stockhausen, cond.; Radio Budapest Children’s Choir (János Reményi, chorus master), Péter Eötvös, cond. Girls Choir of Radio Budapest, Karlheinz Stockhausen, cond.; Zaans Cantatekoor, Holland (Jan Pasveer, choir master); Péter Eötvös (conductor of the soloists in act 1); Karlheinz Stockhausen (sound projection). Stockhausen Complete Edition, CD 36 A–E (5CDs). Kürten: Stockhausen-Verlag, 1992.
- Karlheinz Stockhausen. Musik für Flöte: Kathinka Pasveer spielt 9 Kompositionen. (Kathinkas Gesang als Luzifers Requiem, version for flute and electronic music; In Freundschaft, for flute; Piccolo, solo for piccolo; Amour, for flute; Susanis Echo, for alto flute; Xi, for flute; Zungenspitzentanz, for piccolo; Flautina, for flute with piccolo and alto flute; Ypsilon, for flute.) Stockhausen Complete Edition CD 28 A–B (2CDs). Kürten: Stockhausen-Verlag, 1992.
- Karlheinz Stockhausen for Basset Horn. Michele Marelli, basset horn. (Evas Spiegel, Susani, Die sieben Lieder der Tage, and three other compositions.) Times Future. CD recording, stereo. Stradivarius STR 33958. [Cologno Monzese (Milan)]: Stradivarius, 2013.
- Karlheinz Stockhausen: Amour, Der kleine Harlekin, Wochenkreis. Michele Marelli (clarinet and bassett horn), Antonio Pérez Abellán (synthesizer). Recorded in Cuneo, Italy, and Alicante, Spain, March 2013. CD recording. Wergo WER 6785 2. Mainz: Wergo, 2013.
- Voices in the Wind. Leonard Garrison, flute, alto flute, and piccolo. Stockhausen: Flautina for solo piccolo, flute, and alto flute (one player), and works by nine other composers. Recorded October and November 2012 in the Recording Studio of the Washington State University School of Music, Pullman, Washington. CD recording, 1 sound disc: digital, 4¾ in., stereo. Centaur CRC 3363. [N.p.]: Centaur Records, Inc., 2014.
