= Wolfgang Fernow =

German double bassist and composer

- Born: 3 February 1952; Freiburg im Breisgau, Germany
- Died: 17 May 2022 (aged 70); Freiburg im Breisgau
- Occupation: double bassist

Wolfgang J. Fernow (3 February 1952 – 17 May 2022) was a German double bassist and composer who worked across genres.

== Life ==
Fernow studied with Wolfgang Stert at the Hochschule für Musik Freiburg and with Fernando Grillo at the Academia di Musica in Perugia.

Between 1969 and 1989 he was the director of the Motettenchor Lörrach. He created the music for the films Die lange Hoffnung, Lothar Quinte and for the Polish theatre group Teatr Ósmego Dnia. He plays in classical orchestras. He also accompanied Klaus Bruder in the Trio Avodah and has been in several jazz and ethnic formations, including with Whisper Hot, Two Duos and Uhuru's Afro Music and as a guest with the Yehudi Menuhin Trio. He is attracted by the tension between composition and improvisation ("instant composing"). He currently improvises together with Mike Schweizer and Mathias Stich on silent films, dance and literary projects.

== Recordings ==
- UHURU & die Eingeborenen Ethnisch, Mystisch, Rustikal Vol. 1 (1992, with Eckart Stehlin, Muneer Abdul Fatah among others.)
- Elmar Lampson SubsTanz (col legno 1996)
- Karlheinz Stockhausen Tierkreis – 12 Melodien der Sternzeichen (Wergo 2003, with Michael Riessler, Mike Svoboda, Stefan Hussong, Scott Roller, Michael Kiedaisch)
- Mike Svoboda Do You Love Wagner? (Wergo 2011, with Stefan Hussong, Scott Roller, Michael Kiedaisch).
