= Marco Stroppa =

Italian composer (born 1959)

Marco Stroppa (born 8 December 1959, in Verona) is an Italian composer who writes computer music as well as music for instruments with live electronics.

== Biography ==
Marco Stroppa studied piano, composition, choral direction and electronic music at the conservatoires of Verona, Milan and Venice. From 1980 to 1984, Stroppa collaborated with the Centro di Sonologia Computazionale of the University of Padua, before moving to the United States, where he continued his studies at the Massachusetts Institute of Technology supported by a grant from the Fulbright Foundation until 1986. At MIT he took courses in cognitive psychology, computer science and artificial intelligence.

At the invitation of Pierre Boulez, Stroppa moved to Paris where he led the department for musical research at IRCAM from 1987 until 1990. In 1987, Stroppa founded the composition and computer music course at the International Bartók Festival in Szombathely, Hungary. Following teaching posts at the conservatoires of Lyon and Paris, Stroppa currently is professor of composition at the State University of Music and Performing Arts Stuttgart, where he succeeded Helmut Lachenmann in 1999.

== Awards ==
- 1985 ASCAP Prize
- 1990 Cervo Prize for New Music
- 1996 Composition prize of the Salzburg Easter Festival

== Selected works ==
- 1982–1984 Traiettoria for piano and computer-synthesized tape
- 1987 Pulsazioni
- 1987–1988 Spirali for string quartet
- 1993–1994 Hiranyaloka for orchestra
- 1989–1998 élet...fogytiglan for ensemble
- 1994–1999 Zwielicht for electronics
- 1996–1999 From Needle's Eye for trombone and ensemble
- 1991–2002 Miniature estrose Vols. 1 & 2 (14 pieces for solo piano)
- 2010 Let me sing into your ear for amplified basset horn and chamber orchestra

== Discography ==
Works recorded	Performer(s)	Year of release	Label
Traiettoria	Pierre-Laurent Aimard (piano), Marco Stroppa (sound projection)	1992	WERGO WER 2030-2
Due Miniature Estrose	Pierre-Laurent Aimard (piano)	1992	ADES 202282
Hiranyaloka	Southwest German Radio Symphony Orchestra, Michael Gielen (conductor)	1994	Col Legno WWE 3CD 31882
Spirali	Arditti Quartet, Marco Stroppa (multitrack mixing)	1995	Auvidis/Montaigne MO 782042
Miniature Estrose, Vol. 1	Florian Hölscher (pianoforte)	2004	Stradivarius STR 33713
Let me sing into your ear	Michele Marelli (basset horn), Péter Eötvös (conductor), Kammerfilharmonie Hilversum	2011	NEOS 11114-17
