= Manfred Kniel =

German jazz drummer

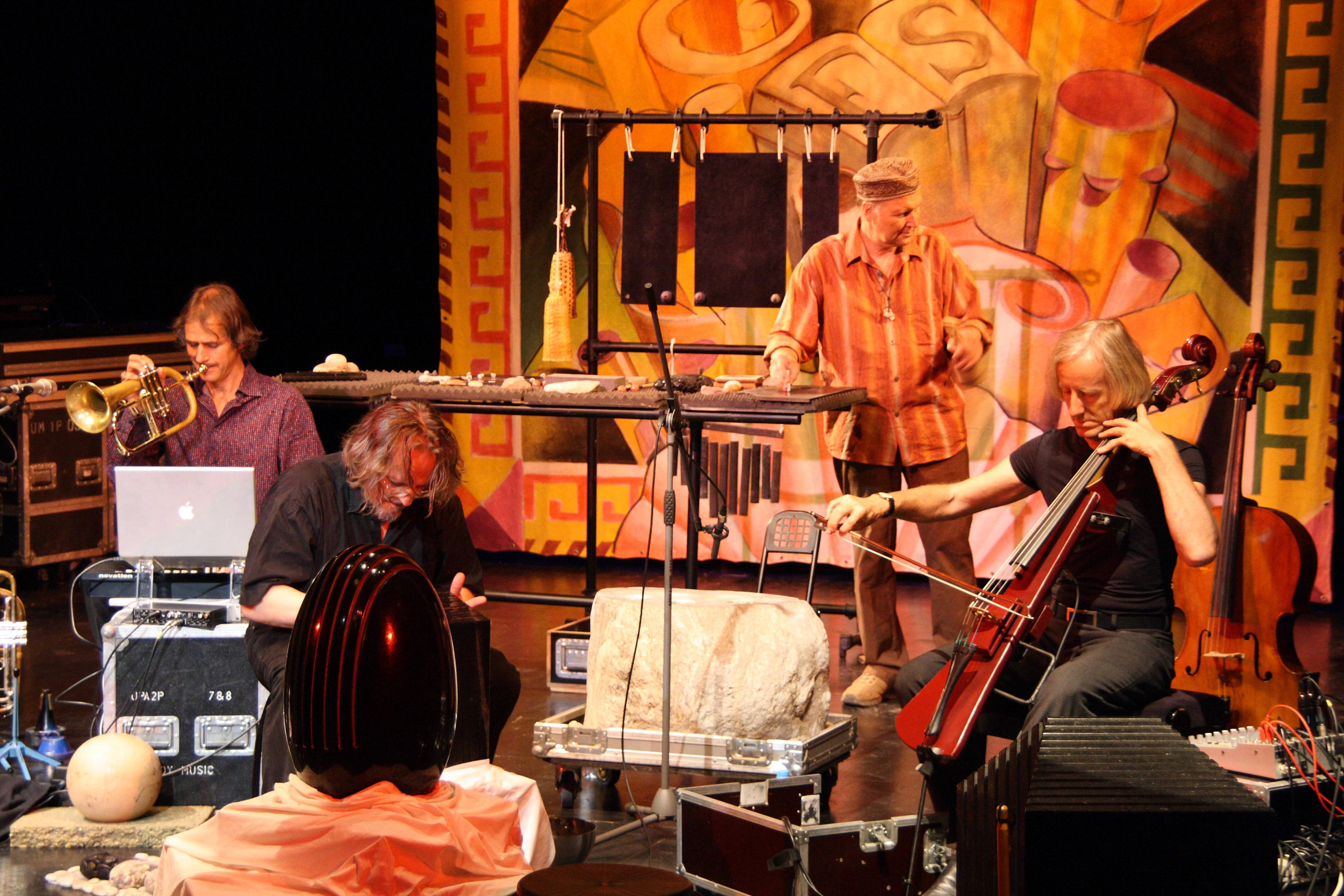
Manfred Kniel (centre right), Klaus Feßmann (centre left) and Fried Dähn (Ensemble Klangstein) with Markus Stockhausen (left) on the TFF Rudolstadt, 2009

Manfred Kniel (born 1951) is a German drummer, percussionist and composer of jazz and free improvisation.

== Life and career ==
Kniel studied percussion at the Musikhochschule Stuttgart until 1976 and has been a professional musician since 1976. From 1973 to 1984, he was a drummer in the "Frédéric Rabold Crew" and in the "Jazz Inspiration Orchestra". In addition, he belonged to the quartet of Lauren Newton, whose album Timbre (re-released as Filigree) was awarded the Preis der deutschen Schallplattenkritik. From 1984 to 1996, he toured with Ekkehard Rössle's quartet, with Mah-Jong SaxString, Jazz it and with his own formations Sweet Emma and Human Music Quintet (HuMus). Between 1984 and 1997, he also took part in more than 30 musical productions under the direction of Nicolas Kemmer. He also belonged to Friedemann's ensemble at the (Aquamarin Orchester in Concert).

In 2003, Kniel founded the internationally acclaimed group The Reduction Quartet, which, like the duo Fifty-Fifty, which he forms with Ekkehard Rössle, aims to play a minimalist influenced jazz. With the cellist Fried Dähn and the sound artist Klaus Feßmann he formed the Ensemble Klangstein, in which he played an Orchestral percussion made of water and stone (?). In 2008, he performed with this project on Stefan Raab's TV Total, and in 2009 at the TFF Rudolstadt.

Since 1984, Kniel has been a lecturer at the State University of Music and Performing Arts Stuttgart in the field of percussion and jazz rhythm.

== Recording ==
- Reduction Quartet Low Down Music (2004, with Mike Svoboda, Karl Farrent, Veit Hübner)
