= Michele Marelli =

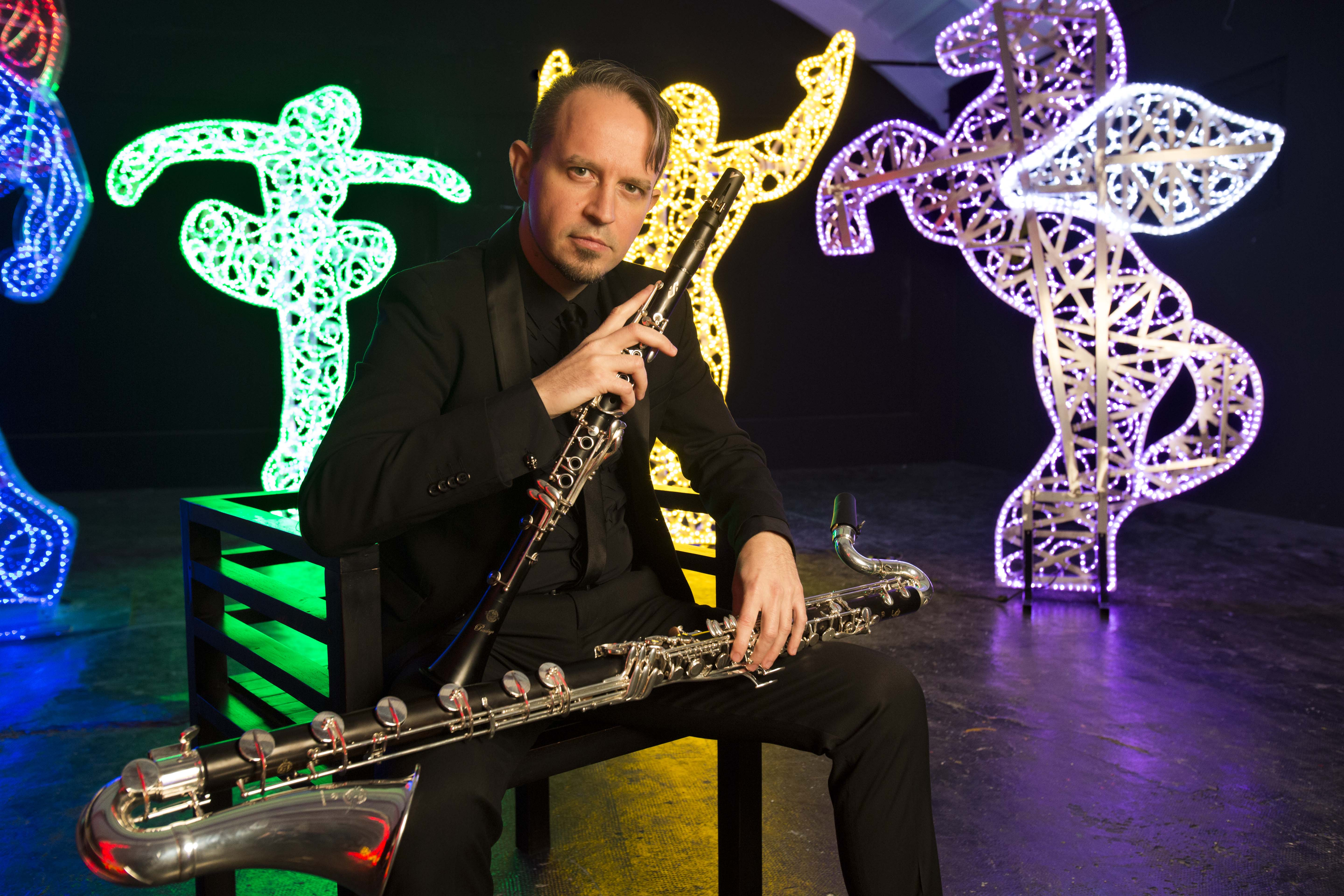
- Michele Marelli in 2018

Background information
- Born: 18 July 1978 (age 47); Alessandria, Italy
- Genres: Classical music
- Occupations: Soloist, chamber musician
- Instruments: Clarinet, basset horn, bass clarinet
- Years active: 1990s–present
- Labels: Decca Classics, Stockhausen Complete Edition, Stradivarius, Neos
- Website: michelemarelli.com

Michele Marelli (born 18 July 1978) is an Italian clarinet and basset horn soloist.

== Biography ==
Michele Marelli, who holds a major in clarinet with highest honors "Summa cum laude" from the Conservatorio Antonio Vivaldi of Alessandria, the city where he was born, under the guidance of Prof. Giacomo Soave, and a degree in Modern Literature from the University of Turin with a thesis on Karlheinz Stockhausen, furthered his studies in England with Alan Hacker, in Germany with Suzanne Stephens and in France with Alain Damiens, and studied composition and electronic music in Torino and Milano.

Internationally acclaimed as a virtuoso of the basset horn and as one of the best contemporary music soloists of his generation, he is also active as a painter and as a composer. In October 2014 he has been awarded the prestigious Rubinstein Prize "Una vita nella musica giovani" at the Gran Teatro La Fenice in Venice together with the composer Salvatore Sciarrino, considered by the critics as a Nobel for music.

In the Summer of 2016, his debut album for DECCA classics was released featuring works by Stockhausen, Pierre Boulez (Dialogue de l'ombre double), Brian Ferneyhough (La chute d'Icare), Giacinto Scelsi and solos written for him by György Kurtág, Ivan Fedele and Marco Stroppa.

As an 18-year-old he met Karlheinz Stockhausen, establishing a profound artistic relationship that lasted for more than a decade during which, chosen by Stockhausen himself as soloist of his ensemble, Marelli played world premières under his instruction and guidance and recorded three CDs for the Stockhausen Complete Edition. Stockhausen himself led Marelli to devote himself to the basset horn.

A six-time winner of the prize of the Stockhausen Stiftung für Musik, other prestigious international prizes he has been awarded include the first prize at the International Contemporary Chamber Music Competition in Kraków (2004), the Valentino Bucchi Clarinet Competition in Rome (2007), the Honorary Logos Award in Belgium (2000), the Jeunesse Musicale auditions (2001), the DESONO association scholarship (from 2001 to 2005) and in 2006 the "Master dei Talenti Musicali" award from the Fondazione CRT, the Prometheus Award for the excellence in culture from the Confindustria Italiana, the International Composition Competition of the Biennale Koper 2012.

He worked with several prominent contemporary composers, often premiering works dedicated to him. These composers included Karlheinz Stockhausen, György Kurtàg, Marco Stroppa, Helmut Lachenmann, Ivan Fedele, Franco Donatoni, Kaija Saariaho, Rebecca Saunders, Fabio Nieder, Sylvano Bussotti, Alberto Colla, Luca Francesconi, among others.

His CDs featuring the clarinet and basset horn works by Stockhausen, published by Stradivarius and WERGO, immediately become reference recordings and are awarded many prizes by international press and critics such as the ICMA 2014 nomination (International Classical Music Awards) as best contemporary music CD of 2013, 5 Diapason awards in France, 5 stelle di Musica, 5 di Amadeus and others.

He performed as soloist with orchestras such as the Orchestre philharmonique de Radio France, Orchestra del Maggio Musicale Fiorentino, the Hilversum Philharmonic Orchestra (Netherlands), the Tanglewood Music Center Orchestra (Tanglewood, US), the Orchestra Sinfonica di Milano Giuseppe Verdi, the Orchestra di Padova e del Veneto, the OMN (Orkiestra Muzyki Nowej), the Archi della Desono, the University of Georgia Chamber Orchestra (US), and with conductors such as Péter Eötvös, Susanna Mälkki, Enno Poppe, Szymon Bywalec, Stefan Asbury, Brad Lubman, Tito Ceccherini, Andrea Pestalozza.

He gave recitals and performed as soloist in festivals and concert halls such as: Radio France Festival Presences, Teatro La Fenice di Venezia, Venice Biennale, Tanglewood Contemporary Music Festival (USA), Donaueschingen Festival, Berliner Festspiele, Berliner Philharmonie, Vienna Festival, MaerzMusik, Warsaw Autumn, Milano Musica, MITO Settembre Musica, Festival d'Automne and Théâtre de la Ville in Paris, MusikTriennale Köln, Philharmonie Luxembourg, Rachmaninov Hall in Moscow, Accademia Filarmonica Romana, Festival Sinopoli di Taormina, Le Fresnoy de Lille, Kraków Philharmonic, Museo Enescu in Bucarest, Teatro Manzoni in Bologna, Angelica Festival, Teatro Carignano and Piccolo Regio in Turin, Unione Musicale di Torino, Giovine Orchestra Genovese, Philharmonie of Ljubljana and many others.

At the Donaueschinger Musiktage, with the Hilversum Orchestra conducted by Péter Eötvös, he performed the world première of the Let me sing into your ear concerto for basset horn and orchestra by Marco Stroppa, which the composer actually dedicated to him and this performance was later recorded for the label Neos.

He collaborates with the Ensemble Musikfabrik in Cologne, is a Henri Selmer Paris and Vandoren Paris official artist, and professor of clarinet at the Conservatory of Teramo.

== Discography ==
Label	Year	Title	Compositions
Stockhausen-Verlag	2002	Stockhausen Complete Edition CD 64	Europa-Gruss, Stop und Start
Stockhausen-Verlag	2003	Stockhausen Complete Edition CD 59	Rechter Augenbrauentanz
Krikri	2006	Krikri Festival 2005 (Belgium)	M. Marelli-P. Boggio Oskar's Dream for basset horn and electronic music
Stradivarius	2010	Harlekin	K. Stockhausen Harlekin
Stockhausen-Verlag	2010	Stockhausen Complete Edition CD 94	Uversa, 16. Stunde aus Klang
Neos	2011	Donaueschinger Musiktage 2010	Marco Stroppa Let me sing into your ear
Stradivarius STR 33958	2013	Stockhausen: for basset horn	K. Stockhausen Traum-Formel, Evas Spiegel, Susani, Die 7 Lieder der Tage, Freia, In Freundschaft
Wergo WER 67852	2013	Amour / Der kleine Harlekin / Wochenkreis	K. Stockhausen Amour, Der kleine Harlekin, Wochenkreis (with Antonio Pérez Abellán, synthesizer)
DECCA Classics (Universal Music)	2016	Michele Marelli – Contemporary Clarinet	Karlheinz Stockhausen Klarinette from Orchester-Finalisten; Tanze Luzefa!; Pierre Boulez Dialogue de l'ombre double; György Kurtág In nomine all'ongherese; Ivan Fedele High; Marco Stroppa Il peso di un respiro; Brian Ferneyhough La chute d'Icare; Giacinto Scelsi KYA

== Awards ==
- A 6-time winner of the Prize of the Stockhausen Stiftung für Musik (2000-2001-2002-2004-2007-2009)
- First Prize at the Krzysztof Penderecki International Contemporary Chamber Music Competition in Kraków (2004)
- Valentino Bucchi International Clarinet Competition, Rome 2007
- Honorary Logos Award, Gent (Belgium) 2000
- Master dei Talenti Musicali of the Fondazione CRT 2006
- the DESONO association scholarship (from 2001 to 2006)
- 5 Diapason Award from the French magazine (February 2012) for his CD Harlekin
- First prize at the International Composition Competition of the Bienale Koper (Slovenia) 2012 (head of jury Vinko Globokar)
- Prometheus Award 2012 of the Gruppo Giovani Imprenditori of the Italian Confindustria for the excellence in culture
