= In Freundschaft =

Composition by Karlheinz Stockhausen

- Chamber music by Karlheinz Stockhausen
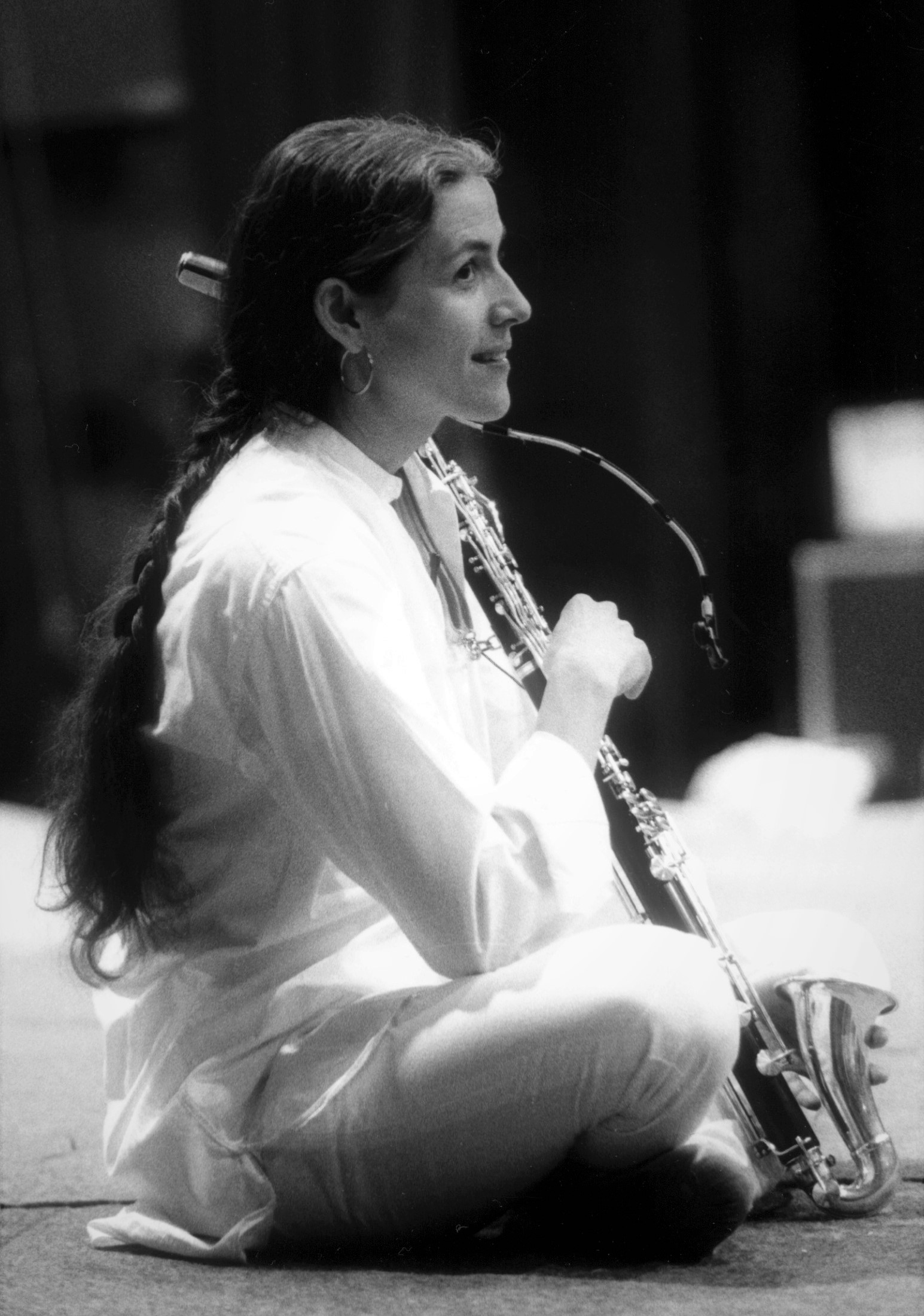
- Suzanne Stephens, for whom In Freundschaft was composed
- Catalogue: 46
- Composed: 1977
- Dedication: Suzanne Stephens
- Performed: 28 July 1977
- Duration: 15 minutes
- Scoring: one instrument, originally clarinet

In Freundschaft (In friendship) is a composition by Karlheinz Stockhausen, number 46 in his catalogue of works. It is a serial composition for a solo instrument, first for clarinet, and later arranged by the composer for many other instruments, often in friendship to specific performers.

In Freundschaft was first conceived in 1977 as a birthday present for clarinetist Suzanne Stephens, and was first performed at her birthday party in Aix-en-Provence on 28 July that year in a version for the flute. It was later reprised on other instruments as the composer adapted it to nearly every standard orchestral instrument at the request of performers. The work is an example of formula composition, with a basic motif first being presented and then varied in two contrasting, cyclical layers; interrupted by cadenzas.

The work has been recorded multiple times, including under the supervision of its composer.

== Background ==
The works by the prolific composer Karlheinz Stockhausen have been grouped in four phases, with the first two matching the decades of the 1950s and the 1960s, the third phase ranging from 1970 to 1977, and finally the rest of his life, dedicated mainly to the composition of Licht, an opera cycle in seven parts begun in 1977. During the third phase, Stockhausen composed in a technique that he termed "formula technique" (Formeltechnik), with works including Mantra (1970), Inori (1974), Jubiläum and In Freundschaft (both 1977). He included the formula method in other compositions of the time such as Tierkreis (1975/76).

== Composition history ==
The first version of In Freundschaft was composed on Sunday, 24 July 1977 in Aix-en-Provence as a birthday gift for Suzanne Stephens. This version was written for the clarinet, but Stockhausen immediately made a fair copy transposition for flute, and it was this version that was first performed, one time each by two American flautists, Lucille Goeres and Marjorie Shansky, for Stephens's birthday party in Aix on 28 July 1977. The first public performance, also of the flute version, was given by Lucille Goeres on 6 August 1977, in a concert by course participants of the Centre Sirius at the Aix Conservatory. Stockhausen reworked the composition on 27 April 1978, at which time he also made versions for oboe, trumpet, violin, and viola. The premiere of the version for clarinet was given by Suzanne Stephens on 30 November 1978 as part of a concert Hommage à Olivier Messiaen, in the Salle Wagram, Paris, and the version for oboe was premiered by Heinz Holliger on 6 July 1979 in a concert themed Music of the 20th Century in the large hall of the broadcaster Saarländischer Rundfunk in Saarbrücken. At around this time, Stockhausen adapted the clarinet version for the basset horn, with extended range to low C3, and this version was first performed by Stephens at a private gathering at the composer’s house on the occasion of his fifty-first birthday on 22 August 1979. Both the clarinet and basset-horn versions are authorised for performance on bass clarinet, and the first public performance of the extended-range version was given by the Dutch bass clarinetist Harry Sparnaay on 10 January 1981 in Haarlem.

In the following years, Stockhausen adapted the work for most of the other standard orchestral instruments. Between 7 and 10 January 1981, in collaboration with Warren Stewart, Stockhausen made a version for cello, which Stewart premiered at the Eastman School of Music on 23 April 1981. Even before this premiere, Stockhausen had adapted it, from 16 to 19 April 1981, as a new version for violin. A version for bassoon followed the next year, composed on 19 and 20 April 1982 for Kim Walker. During rehearsals, Stockhausen came to imagine the piece being played by a teddy bear, like the one he had had as a small child, only much larger. Walker had a costume made, and gave the premiere in the Wigmore Hall in London on 10 May 1982 under the title "In Freundschaft, for a teddy bear with bassoon". A version for trombone was requested by Mark Tezak, who finalized the details with Stockhausen during rehearsals in August and September 1982. Around the same time, John Sampen requested and performed a version for soprano saxophone, though Stockhausen made further adjustments the next year with the saxophonist Hugo Read. At the request of the hornist Alejandro Govea Zappino, a version for his instrument was prepared during rehearsals on 17 November 1983, but further changes were carried out up to 11 September 1984 and the premiere was only finally given by Jens McManama, hornist with the Ensemble InterContemporain, at a concert in Baden-Baden celebrating Pierre Boulez’s 60th birthday on 31 March 1985. Even a version for alto recorder came into existence, at the instigation of Geesche Geddert, first in an exchange of letters, then in rehearsal with Stockhausen on 6 April 1984. The published score of the cello version can also be played on double bass, and a version for tuba also exists. In response to a suggestion by his trumpet-player son, Markus (who had put off attempting the work for 20 years), he replaced the original trumpet version with a new one for trumpet in E♭ with a special fourth valve. Markus gave the world premiere of this new version in Kürten on 31 August 1997.

== Analysis ==
In Freundschaft begins with a basic musical formula (transcribed below), which defines the musical parameters: pitch, duration, dynamics, and timbre. It is used as a motif for further variation. The basic formula consists of five segments, containing 1, 3, 2, 5, and 8 notes—therefore 19 notes in all—occupying durational units of approximately 1, 2, 3, 5, and 8 quarter-notes' duration, though the ending is altered in the introductory statement—a "reduced formula" ending with a slow oscillation between two notes a semitone apart. This formula is then presented in two registrally separated and permuted alternating statements, similar to the arrangement in Stockhausen’s Mantra, so that the work may be said to be monothematic. Initially, the separation of the two layers is emphasized through the dynamics: the higher level is consistently pp, the lower one ff.

Each layer consists of five segments, and the rests separating the segments in the upper layer correspond to the lengths of the sounding segments in the lower one. Measured in sixteenth notes (and therefore on average a quarter the lengths of the upper-layer segments), these are: 4, 7, 2, 11, and 0 (= grace note). The segment statements are separated by a middle-register semitone trill (A to B♭ in the clarinet version), which first emerges from a gradual acceleration of the last interval of the fifth segment in the introduction.

After the initial presentation, the opposing characters of the two layers are gradually evened out, in a process of development over seven cyclical statements of the formula, until the two layers are merged into a single melody. This is accomplished by progressively transposing the upper level downward by one semitone per cycle, and the lower level upward by the same degree. In this way, the entirely separate ranges in the first cycle (F♯_{5}–F_{6} and F♯_{4}–F_{5}) are brought into the single octave C_{5}–B_{5} in the seventh.

The overall form is interrupted by two cadenzas, the first between the third and fourth cycles, the second at the point of union between the two layers, beginning near the end of the sixth cycle and leading to the seventh.

== Discography ==
There are recordings of In Freundschaft for various instruments. Some versions have been recorded multiple times. Stockhausen-Verlag issued a series of recordings under the composer's supervision, as part of the complete recordings of his works beginning in 1991.

Solo instrument	Recordings
Flute	Karlheinz Stockhausen: Musik für Flöte. Kathinka Pasveer, flute. 2-CD set. Stockhausen Complete Edition CD 28A-B. Kürten: Stockhausen-Verlag, 1992.
Recorder	Karlheinz Stockhausen: In Freundschaft für Blockflöte, für Fagott, für Horn, für Kontrabass. Geesche Geddert, alto recorder. Stockhausen Complete Edition CD 101. Kürten: Stockhausen-Verlag, 2012.
Oboe	Christian Hommel: Bach, Mozart, Huber, Stockhausen. Christian Hommel, oboe; Kay Johannsen, harpsichord. CD recording. Ars Musici Primavera AMP 5005-2. Primavera HM 2067-2. Freiburg: Ars Musici, 1993. Also issued on CD as Deutsche Harmonia Mundi HM/DMR 2067-2. Freiburg: Freiburger Musik Forum, 1993.; Karlheinz Stockhausen: In Freundschaft for oboe; Linker Augentanz; Taurus; Taurus-Quintett; Kamel-Tanz; Rotary-Bläserquintett. Claire Sirjacobs, oboe. CD recording, 1 disc: digital, 12 cm, stereo. Stockhausen Complete Edition CD 105. Kürten: Stockhausen-Verlag, 2015.
Clarinet	Stockhausen: In Freundschaft, Traum-Formel, Amour. Suzanne Stephens, clarinet & basset horn. CD recording. Deutsche Grammophon 419 378–2. Hamburg: Polydor International GmbH, 1988. Reissued on Deutsche Grammophon 423 378–2. Hamburg: Polydor International GmbH, 1988. Reissued on Stockhausen Complete Edition CD 27 (CD). Kürten: Stockhausen-Verlag, 1992.; Clarinet in the XXth Century. Ivan Stochl, clarinet; Boris Nedeltchev, piano. CD recording. Gega GD 120 1991. Sofia: Gega, Ltd., 1992.; 20th Century Music for Unaccompanied Clarinet. Paul Meyer, clarinet. CD recording. Denon CO-78917. [Tokyo]: Nippon Columbia Co., Ltd., 1994.; Dal Niente. Eduard Brunner, clarinet. CD recording. ECM New Series ECM1599 453 257–2. [Germany]: ECM Records GmbH, 1997.; Alain Damiens Clarinette. Alain Damiens, clarinet. CD recording. ADDA 581066. 1988. Reissued as: Damiens: Clarinet Solos. 06/17/2002. CD recording. Accord 472337.
Basset horn	Musik für Klarinette, Baßklarinette, Bassetthorn: Suzee Stephens spielt 15 Kompositionen. Stockhausen Complete Edition CD 32 A–C (3 CDs). Kürten: Stockhausen-Verlag, 1994.; Karlheinz Stockhausen for Basset Horn. Michele Marelli, basset horn. Times Future. CD recording, stereo. Stradivarius STR 33958. [Cologno Monzese (Milan)]: Stradivarius, 2013.
Bass clarinet	Karlheinz Stockhausen: Bass Clarinet & Piano. Volker Hemken, bass clarinet; Steffen Schleiermacher, piano. 09/25/2007. CD recording. MDG 6131451. Detmold: Musikproduktion Dabringhaus und Grimm, 2007.; In Freundschaft, für Violine, Bassklarinette, Viola, Tuba, Violoncello. Petra Stump, bass clarinet. Recorded 34 May 2013 at Sound Studio N, Cologne. CD recording, 1 disc: digital, 12 cm, stereo.Stockhausen Complete Edition CD 102. Kürten: Stockhausen-Verlag, 2014.
Saxophone	Daniel Kientzy: Saxophones. Daniel Kientzy, saxophone. CD recording. ADDA 581047. With works by Berio, Cacana, Mache, Scelsi, Stroe, and Vaggione.; Arno Bornkamp: Reed My Mind: Contemporary Music for Saxophone. Arno Bornkamp, alto saxophone. CD recording. BVHaast CD 9304. Amsterdam: BVHaast, 1994.; Outline. Giovanni Nardi, soprano saxophone. CD recording. Video Radio Classics (Italy) VR CD 000412.; The Solitary Saxophone. Claude Delangle, saxophone. CD recording. Bis CD-640. Djursholm: Grammofon AB BIS, 1994.; Scena. Timothy McAllister, saxophone. Mead, Lauba, Steinberg, Carter,07/25/2000 CD recording. Equilibrium EQ 32. Dexter, MI: Equilibrium, 1999.; In Friendship. James Romain, saxophone; Kevin Class, piano. 05/27/2008 CD recording. Centaur CRC 2916. [Baton Rouge, La.]: Centaur Records, 2008.; Saxophon. Julien Petit, saxophon. CD recording. Stockhausen Complete Edition CD 78. Kürten: Stockhausen-Verlag, 2005.
Bassoon	Stockhausen: Music for Bassoon. Knut Sönstevold, bassoon; Kina Sönstevold, piano. CD recording. Nosag CD 42. [Sweden]: Nosag Records, 2000.; Bassoon XX/Fagott XX. Rino Vernizzi, bassoon; Gianpaolo Ascolese, drum set; Gianluca Renzi, double Bass; New Music Studium, Antonio Plotino, cond. CD recording. Arts Music 47644. [Germany]: Arts Music, 2001.; Karlheinz Stockhausen: In Freundschaft für Blockflöte, für Fagott, für Horn, für Kontrabass. Edurne Santos, bassoon. Stockhausen Complete Edition CD 101. Kürten: Stockhausen-Verlag, 2012.
Horn	Karlheinz Stockhausen: In Freundschaft für Blockflöte, für Fagott, für Horn, für Kontrabass. Christine Chapman, horn. Stockhausen Complete Edition CD 101. Kürten: Stockhausen-Verlag, 2012.
Trumpet	Markus Stockhausen Plays Karlheinz Stockhausen. Markus Stockhausen, trumpet; Niek de Groot, contrabass; Annette Meriweather, soprano. CD recording. EMI Classics 7243 5 56645 2 5. Cologne: EMI Electrola GmbH, 1998. Reissued on: Stockhausen: Aries, Halt, Pietà, In Freundschaft. Stockhausen Complete Edition 60. Also reissued on: 20th Century Classics. 2-CD set. EMI Classics 6955982. [London]: EMI Classics, 2009.
Trombone	The Solitary Trombone. Christian Lindberg, trombone. CD recording. Bis CD-388. Djursholm: Grammofon AB BIS, 1989.; Musik für Posaune und Euphonium. Michael Svoboda, trombone and euphonium. CD recording. Stockhausen Complete Edition CD 44. Kürten: Stockhausen-Verlag, 1997.
Tuba	In Freundschaft, für Violine, Bassklarinette, Viola, Tuba, Violoncello. Hans Nickel, tuba. Recorded 24 March 2012 at Sound Studio N, Cologne. CD recording, 1 disc: digital, 12 cm, stereo. Stockhausen Complete Edition CD 102. Kürten: Stockhausen-Verlag, 2014.
Violin	In Freundschaft, für Violine, Bassklarinette, Viola, Tuba, Violoncello. Raul Lustgarten, violin. Recorded 14 December 2013 at Sound Studio N, Cologne. CD recording, 1 disc: digital, 12 cm, stereo. Stockhausen Complete Edition CD 102. Kürten: Stockhausen-Verlag, 2014.
Viola	In Freundschaft, für Violine, Bassklarinette, Viola, Tuba, Violoncello. Anna Tkatchouk, viola. Recorded 30 March 2014 at Sound Studio N, Cologne. CD recording, 1 disc: digital, 12 cm, stereo. Stockhausen Complete Edition CD 102. Kürten: Stockhausen-Verlag, 2014.
Cello	Ciaccona. Friedrich Gauwerky, cello. LP recording. Edition Michael F. Bauer MFB 048. [German]: Edition Michael F. Bauer, 1987.; In Freundschaft, für Violine, Bassklarinette, Viola, Tuba, Violoncello. Friedrich Gauwerky, cello. Recorded 17 March 2012 at Sound Studio N, Cologne. CD recording, 1 disc: digital, 12 cm, stereo. Stockhausen Complete Edition CD 102. Kürten: Stockhausen-Verlag, 2014.
Double bass	Karlheinz Stockhausen: In Freundschaft für Blockflöte, für Fagott, für Horn, für Kontrabass. Heiko Maschmann, double bass. Stockhausen Complete Edition CD 101. Kürten: Stockhausen-Verlag, 2012.

== Reception ==
In an obituary by the CBC summarised in 2007:

In the 1970s, he took up "formula composition" and created a simple style that became a model for a new generation of German composers. Tierkreis (Zodiac) and In Freundschaft (In Friendship) are his most recorded works from this period.
