= Rotary Wind Quintet =

Chamber music composition by Karlheinz Stockhausen

- Chamber music by Karlheinz Stockhausen
- Catalogue: 70 1/2
- Related: Mittwoch aus Licht
- Occasion: 25th anniversary of Rotary Club of Cologne-Römerturm
- Composed: 1997
- Performed: 27 October 1997
- Scoring: flute; oboe; clarinet; horn; bassoon

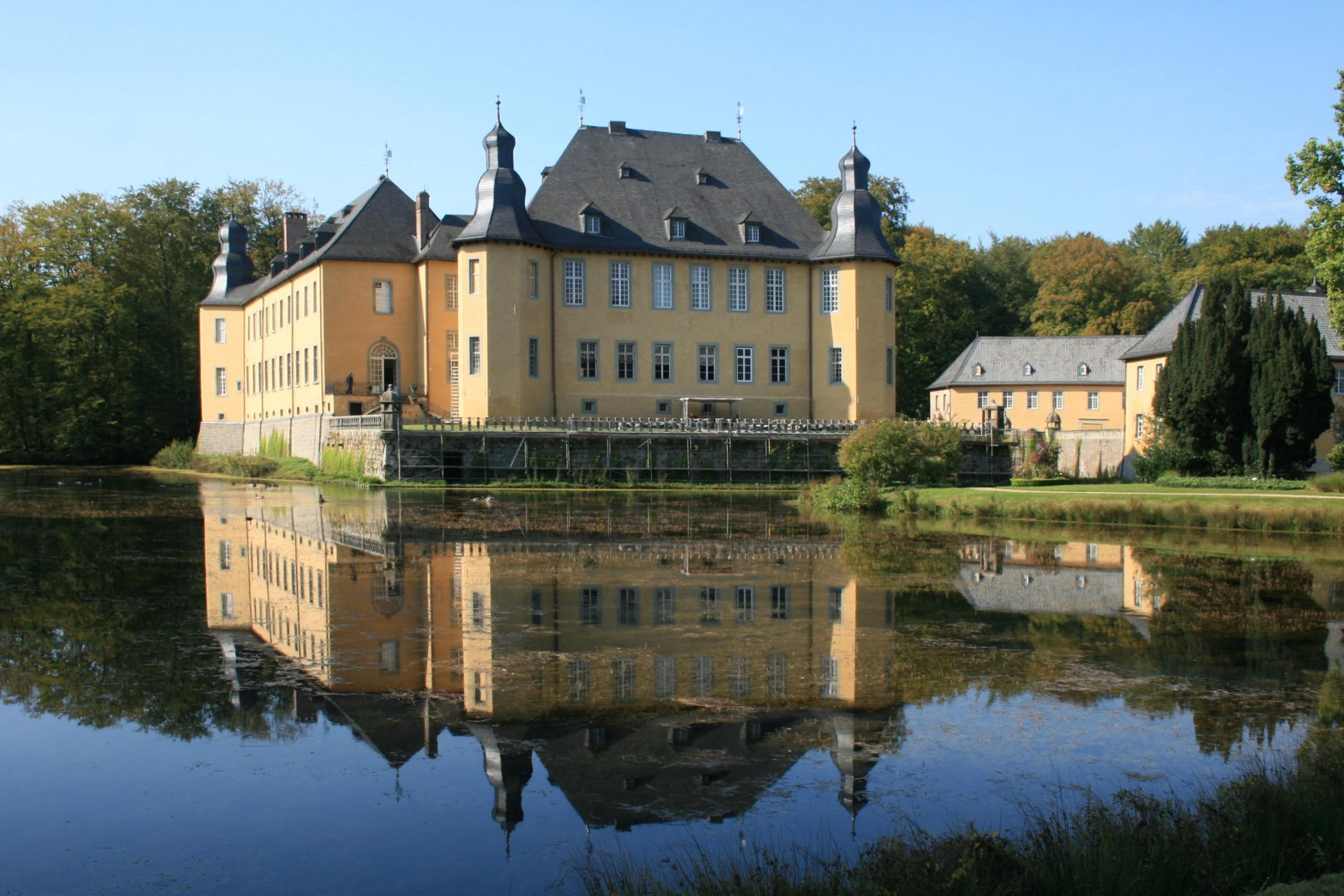
Schloss Dyck in Jüchen, where the Rotary quintet was premiered

The Rotary Wind Quintet is a chamber music composition by Karlheinz Stockhausen, the last of his three wind quintets (following Zeitmaße and Adieu) and is Nr. 70½ in his catalogue of works. A performance lasts about 8½ minutes.

== History ==
The Rotary quintet was composed in September 1997 on a commission from Henrik Rolf Hanstein, president of the Rotary Club of Cologne-Römerturm, on the occasion of the club's 25th anniversary. It was first performed by musikFabrik (Helen Bledsoe, flute, Peter Veale, oboe, Nina Janßen, clarinet, Jan Babinec, horn, and Alban Wesley, bassoon) on 25 October 1997 at a meeting of the club held at the Schloss Dyck in Jüchen in the Rhein-Kreis Neuss.

The premiere was sprung by Hanstein as a surprise on the 200 or so club members, who had gathered for a banquet and were already seated when it was announced that, before any food or drinks would be served, a work by Stockhausen composed for the occasion would be performed. The captive audience, few of whom would have attended a Stockhausen concert voluntarily, were pleasantly surprised and gave the piece a standing ovation. Stockhausen then gave a brief explanation about the composition which was played a second time, and once more received in the same fashion.

== Analysis ==
Like the Helicopter String Quartet, The Rotary Wind Quintet is a component of the opera Mittwoch aus Licht. It is an adaptation of the concluding part of the "carousel" section of scene 4, Michaelion, for choir, four instrumental soloists, and bass singer. In the opera, this subsection is a vocal "spatial sextet" titled "Menschen hört", and is also the conclusion of the Bassetsu Trio (for trumpet, basset horn, and trombone), which is a module of three melodic strands in the fabric of the carousel section. These strands consist of the three-layered super-formula of Licht, and are rotated vertically four times. At each change of the layers, the musicians also rotate their positions in the performance space.

The work is divided into four phases, connected by sustained chords during which the performers change positions in the hall. Each phase presents a different vertical disposition of the three strands of the Licht super-formula. In phase 1, the Michael formula is in the upper voice, the Lucifer formula in the lowest voice, and the Eve formula in between. In phase 2, the Lucifer formula moves to the top, Michael is in the middle, and Eve below. In phase 3, the Eve formula is uppermost, Lucifer in the middle, and Michael below. In phase 4, the three formulas return to their starting positions. Each phase is a longer and more elaborate version of the formula than its predecessor. The formula closes on a C dominant-seventh chord, and the rotations cause the four phases to cadence on this chord first in root position, then in 4/2 inversion, 6/5 inversion, and finally in root position again.

== Discography ==
- Stockhausen, Karlheinz. In Freundschaft for oboe; Linker Augentanz; Taurus; Taurus-Quintett; Kamel-Tanz; Rotary-Bläserquintett. In the Rotary Quintet: Quintette Aquilon (Marion Ralincourt, flute; Claire Sirjacobs, oboe; Stéphanie Corre, clarinet; Marianne Tilquin, horn; Gaêlle Habert, bassoon). Recorded 12 August 2014 in Sound Studio N, Cologne. CD recording, 1 disc: digital, 12cm, stereo. Stockhausen Complete Edition CD 105. Kürten: Stockhausen-Verlag, 2015.
