= Mike Svoboda =

American composer and trombonist

Michael Svoboda (born 1960) is an American composer and trombonist who lives and works in Switzerland.

== Life ==
Born in Guam, Svoboda grew up in Chicago and studied composition and conducting at the University of Illinois. In 1981, he came to Germany on the basis of a composition prize. There, he studied trombone at the State University of Music and Performing Arts Stuttgart. From 1984 to 1995, he worked as a performer with Karlheinz Stockhausen.

Svoboda lives in Switzerland where he has been teaching as Professor for contemporary chamber music and trombone at the Musikhochschule Basel since 2007.

== Work ==
In guest appearances at the Royal Opera House, La Scala and other opera houses, he impersonated Lucifer in Stockhausen's opera cycle Licht. He has also worked as a trombonist with composers such as Péter Eötvös, Heinz Holliger, Toshio Hosokawa, Helmut Lachenmann, Wolfgang Rihm, Martin Smolka and Frank Zappa and has premiered more than four hundred works to date.

From 1995, Svoboda turned back to composition. He put together the programme Mike Svoboda's Alphorn Special from individual pieces. He received commissions for full-length programmes among others from the Staatstheater Hannover, the Nationaltheater Mannheim, the Südwestrundfunk and the Württembergische Philharmonie Reutlingen. He participated in the programmes 14 Attempts to Learn to Love Wagner and My God Mozart! (both 2002) as well as Clara, Robert and Johannes - Fantasy about a Romantic Triangle (2004) as composer, arranger, trombonist and speaker.

In 2003 he composed Love Hurts - Carmen Remix for orchestra with one soloist and Reflective Structures for 21 strings and solo percussion, in 2005 Alias - Mozart is Rossini for string orchestra and solo trombone. In the 2005–06 season, his children's opera Erwin, das Naturtalent, based on a libretto by Manfred Weiss, was performed at the Stuttgart State Opera. In 2007, he created Der unglaubliche Spotz, also to a libretto by Manfred Weiss. At the opening of the 2010 Niedersächsische Musiktage, Svoboda's Music for Open Spaces for soprano, 8 trombones and approx. 150 wind instruments was performed with great success. In 2011, the world premiere of his trombone concerto Music for Trombone and Orchestra took place at the "ECLAT - Festival Neue Musik Stuttgart" with the Stuttgart Radio Symphony Orchestra and Svoboda as soloists.

Svoboda was already artist in residence at the 61st Sommerliche Musiktage Hitzacker in 2006. Here his pieces Raumgewinn - Musik für eine Elbaue and 70%, a "jazz nocturne on the theme of water" were premiered. He was also artist and/or composer in residence at the festival Mouvement - Music in the 21st Century of the Saarländischer Rundfunk (2007), at the Weingartner Musiktage Junger Künstler (2008) and at the Opernhaus Chemnitz (October 2009).

Svoboda performs with his own mike svoboda ensemble (founded 2005). In addition, he works or He has also worked with various jazz formations (such as the Reduction Quartet of Manfred Kniel) and with orchestras such as the Deutsches Symphonie-Orchester Berlin, the orchestras of the Bayerischer Rundfunk, the Westdeutscher Rundfunk and the Südwestdeutscher Rundfunk, the Bamberg Symphonys, the Ensemble Modern, the Schönberg Ensemble and the Klangforum Wien as well as in duo formations with the accordionist Stefan Hussong and the percussionist Michael Kiedaisch.

On numerous CDs he recorded works by contemporary composers (besides Stockhausen, Zappa, Eötvös and Rihm, also compositions by Michael Riessler, Bernd Thewes, Christoph Staude, Iannis Xenakis) and his own compositions, as well as recordings with various jazz ensembles and duo partners.

== Awards ==
- 1982: BMI (Broadcast Music Incorporated) Award
- 2000: Schneider-Schott Music Prize together with Michael Riessler
- 2005: Preis der deutschen Schallplattenkritik for the CD Giacinto Scelsi - Suono Rotondo
- 2008: Music Innovation Prize of the Praetorius Musikpreis of the State of Lower Saxony

== Work ==
=== Stage music ===
- Der unglaubliche Spotz - Not a fairy tale, but an opera for everyone from 6 upwards (2007) (Score)
- Erwin, das Naturtalent, Opera (2005/07)

=== Vocal work ===
- Da steht geschrieben for mezzo-soprano and harp after a text fragment by Friedrich Hölderlin (2011) (Score)
- Die Bücher der Zeiten for three female voices, trombone and percussion after the text of the same name by Friedrich Hölderlin (2010)
- Alleluja.Alleluja for two choirs, four female voices and four brass instruments (2008) (Score)
- 20 French Songs for mezzo-soprano, trombone and accordion (2006)
- Raumgewinn - Musik für eine Elbaue for brass band, choir and mezzo-soprano solo after two poems by Rainer Maria Rilke (2006) (Score)

=== Orchestral pieces ===
- Music for Trombone and Orchestra (2010) (Score)
- Music for Open Spaces for large wind orchestra, 8 trombones and solo voice (2010)
- Inner Antiphony - Fanfare for Orchestra and two Percussionists (2009) (Score)
- More Pentatonic Irony für zwei zweistimmige Chöre und Orchester (2009)
- Love Hurts - Carmen Remix für Posaune und Orchester (2003/2010) (Score)
- Reflective Structures for 21 strings and percussion solo (2003)

=== Chamber music / Ensemblewerke ===
- Music for Trombone, Piano and Percussion (2011)
- Antiphony without Irony for four large brass ensembles and four soloists (2009) (Score)
- Konzertetüden 1-5 für Posaune solo (2008)
- Music for Piccolo solo (2008)
- Studien zu Adorno (sex, drugs and new music) for a vocal soloist, two ensembles and video art (2007) (Score)
- transition/intuition for ensemble (2007)
- Five Cannon Studies for trombone and accordion (2006) (Score)

=== Articles ===
- Mike Svoboda: Der Posaunist Vinko Globokar. In Werner Klüppelholz, Sigrid Konrad (ed.): Vinko Globokar: 14 Arten einen Musiker zu beschreiben. Saarbrücken 2008, pp. 144–151.
- Mike Svoboda: "Jedermann wird Ihnen sagen, dass ich kein Musiker bin". Erik Saties wissenschaftlicher Umgang mit der Musik oder: In der Begrenzung liegt die Freiheit. In Neue Zeitschrift für Musik. April 2007, pp. 48–50
- Mike Svoboda: NUN - An Inside View. In Helmut Lachenmann - Inward Beauty. Edited by Dan Albertson, Contemporary Music Review 23 (2004), issue 3/4, pp. 161–164.
- Mike Svoboda: Interpretation als Verdeutlichung einer Komposition. Karlheinz Stockhausen: "Tierkreis - 12 Melodien der Sternzeichen" (1975). In Neue Zeitschrift für Musik. 06/2002, pp. 24–27.

== CDs ==
- John Cage: Trombone and Piano, Steffen Schleiermacher (piano) and Mike Svoboda (trombone), MDG 613 1510-2
- Frescobaldi/Cage: Anarchic Harmonies, Stefan Hussong (accordion) and Mike Svoboda (alto and tenor trombones), WERGO 6655 2 2001
- Erik Satie/Mike Svoboda: Phonométrie, Anne-May Krüger (vocals, barrel organ, toy piano), Stefan Hussong (accordion) and Mike Svoboda (trombone), WERGO 68062
- Mike Svoboda: do you love wagner?, Wolfgang Fernow (double bass), Scott Roller (violoncello), Michael Kiedaisch (percussion) and Mike Svoboda (trombone, compositions), WERGO 6802 2
- Karlheinz Stockhausen: Tierkreis - 12 Melodies of the Zodiac Signs (1975), in two realisations: No. 1 for 5 musicians and No. 2 for 5 improvisers, Stefan Hussong (accordion), Michael Riessler (bass clarinet), Wolfgang Fernow (double bass), Scott Roller (violoncello), Michael Kiedaisch (percussion) and Mike Svoboda (trombone, music boxes and musical direction), WERGO 6659 2
- Giacinto Scelsi: Suono Rotondo, Stefano Scodanibbio (double bass), Michael Kiedaisch (percussion) and Mike Svoboda (trombone) - awarded the Preis der deutschen Schallplattenkritik, WERGO 6672 2
- Franz Schubert: Schubertiade Zwölf Lieder aus der Winterreise (2002) Künstler: Grace Davidson, Michael Kiedaisch, Eberhard Hahn, Wolfgang Fernow, Mike Svoboda
