= Stefan Hussong =

German classical accordionist

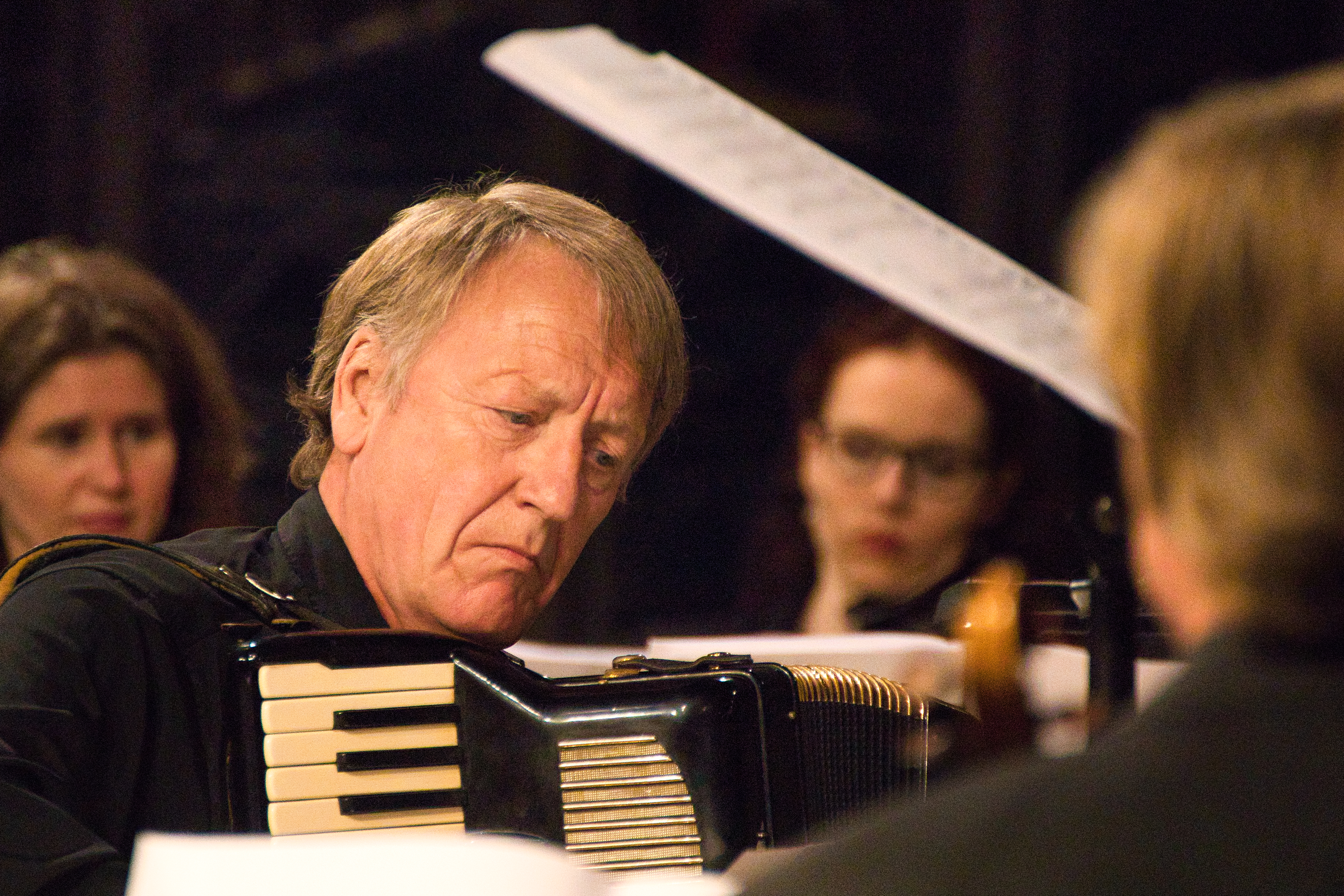
Stefan Hussong, 2022

Stefan Hussong (born 2 November 1962) is a German classical accordionist.

He has received numerous awards for his performances, including the Gaudeamus International Competition for Performers for contemporary classical music, and was named best instrumentalist of the year by ECHO Klassik.

== Life ==
Born in Köllerbach, Püttlingen, Hussong studied with Eugen Tschanun, Hugo Noth, Joseph Macerollo and Mayumi Miyata at the Trossingen University of Music, Toronto and Tokyo Conservatories (Geijutsu Daigaku). In 1983, he won first prize in the Hugo Herrmann Competition.

His work as a soloist is shared with many orchestras, such as the Orchestre de la Suisse Romande, the Tokyo Symphony Orchestra, the Tokyo Harmonia Chamber Orchestra, the Klangforum Wien and the Ensemble Modern. He has joined musicians such as violinist Irvine Arditti and cellists Julius Berger and Miklós Perényi.

He is a professor of classical accordion and chamber music at the Hochschule für Musik Würzburg.

== Style and repertoire ==
Hussong's repertoire ranges from Baroque music to contemporary music, where he collaborates with the composers Sofia Gubaidulina, Toshio Hosokawa, Adriana Hölszky and Klaus Huber.

Hussong points out that the accordion, which had been a little-used instrument in academic music, has become a fascinating instrument because of the technical possibilities it possesses: "a wind instrument with a keyboard, with a wide dynamic and tonal spectrum".

== Prizes ==
- 1983 – First prize at the international Hugo Hermann competition.
- 1987 – First prize at the Gaudeamus International Competition for Performers.
- 1999 – Best Instrumentalist of the Year ECHO Klassik.

== Recordings ==
- 1987: Johann Sebastian Bach, Goldberg Variations; Sweelinck, Fantasia.
- 1989: Nouvelle musique pour accordéon : works by Sofia Goubaïdoulina, V. Heyn, Klaus Huber, J. Krebs.
- 1992: John Cage.
- 1993: Sofia Goubaïdoulina, Sieben Worte, In croce – Orchestre de chambre Diagonal, dir. Florian Rosensteiner (29 May 1992/10 June 1993), Wergo 286 263-2) OCLC 32194078.
- 1993: Adriana Hölszky, Space, Miserere, Decorum, Nouns to Nouns I, Innere Welten, Sonett.
- 1993: Uros Rojko – Ensemble Aventure and Stefan Hussong, Whose Song, Tati, Ottoki, Glass voices.
- 1994: Johann Sebastian Bach, English Suites Nos. 2, 3 and 5 (Denon)
- 1995: Tango Fantasy (9–10 January 1995, Denon CO-78841) OCLC 52686397.
- 1996: Portrait of Toshio Hosokawa, Melodia, Sen V, In die Tiefe der Zeit, Vertical Time-study I, III (1996, Col Legno 20016) OCLC 658912305.
- 1996: Toshio Hosokawa, In die Tiefe der Zeit; John Cage, Two⁴ – with Julius Berger, violoncello (29 April 1996, Wergo WER 6617-2) OCLC 811338167.
- 1997: Stefan Hussong joue Jean-Sébastien Bach : Partitas Nos. 2 and 4, three chorales (24–26 December 1996, Denon CO-18031) OCLC 43207848.
- 1997: In die Tiefe der Zeit.
- 1997: Whose Song, Musique d'accordéon du XXth : Toshio Hosokawa (Sen V), Magnus Lindberg (Jeux d'anches), Uros Rojko (Whose song), John Cage (Souvenir), À. Hölszky (Miserere), Igor Stravinsky (Tango) (December 1992, Thorofon) OCLC 30115192.
- 1997: Révolutionnaires Tangos by Astor Piazzolla.
- 1997: Stefan Hussong joue Cage : Dream, In a landscape, Souvenir, Two³ No. 5... (19–20 August 1997), Denon CO-18069) OCLC 43304458.
- 1999: Stefan Hussong joue Frescobaldi.
- 1999: Uros Rojko Chamber Music.
- 2000: T'W'ogether. Stefan Hussong et Mie Miki interpètent Bach, Piazzolla, Mozart, Jukka Tiensuu, Solar, Takemitsu.
- 2002: Sonora Distancia.
- 2002: Bach – 3 Sonates pour viole de gambe et clavier BWV 1027–1029
- 2002 High Way for One. À. Hölszky (High way for one), L. Berio (Sequenza XIII), K. Harada, À. Nordheim (Dinosauros), S. Gubaidulina (De profundis), Hyunkyung Lim (Me-A-Ri) (2000, Bella Musica Edition) OCLC 605916088.
- 2002: Anarchic Harmonies. Girolamo Frescobaldi (Canzoni per Basso), John Cage (Harmonies).
- 2003: Karlheinz Stockhausen Tierkreis (July 2002, Wergo) OCLC 806985540.
- 2004: Toshio Hosokawa | Gagaku – Deep silence (18–20 February 2003), Wergo) OCLC 57450220.
- 2005: Wolke und Mond – Johann Sebastian Bach, Adriana Hölszky.
- 2008: Phonométrie : Erik Satie, Mike Svoboda; Anna May Krüger, voice, barrel organ, toy piano, melodica; Stefan Hussong, accordeon, toy piano, melodica; Mike Svoboda, trombone, melodica (January, March 2007, Wergo) OCLC 796203877
- 2012: David Eagle and Hope Lee, Secret of the seven stars – with David Eagle, computer; New Music Concerts Ensemble; Robert Aiken, flute and conductor (8 February 2009, November 2010, 25 September 2011, 16 April 2012 Centrediscs) OCLC 811863245
- 2015: Cage, Two 3 (2013, 2CD Wergo) OCLC 926007681
- 2017: Midstream (4–8 April 2016, Wergo) OCLC 989718555
