= Musica (French music festival) =

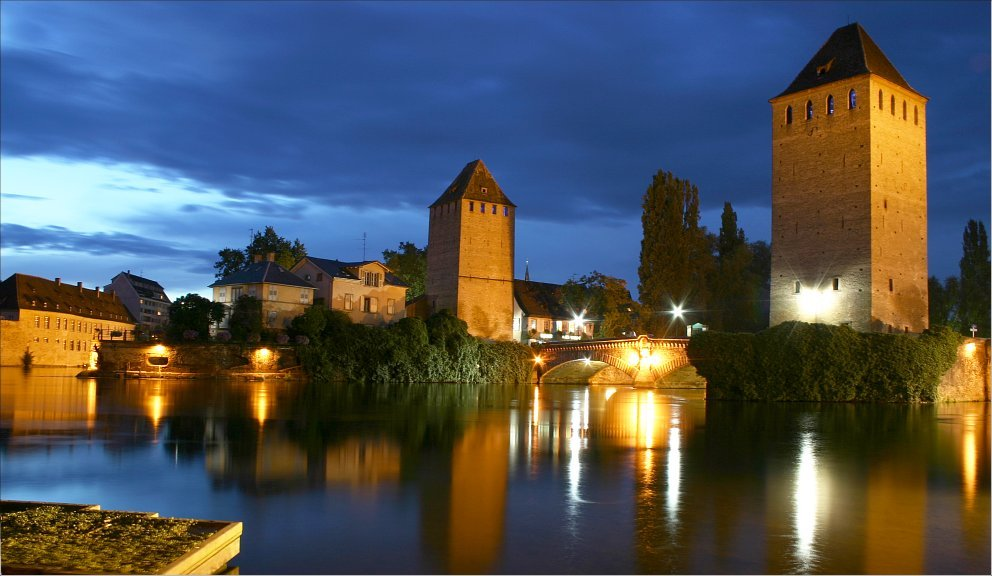
The covered bridges, in the district of Petite France, in Strasbourg

Musica is a festival of contemporary classical music held annually in Strasbourg since 1983. The specialization in modern music is encouraged by government patronage.
