= Françoise Kubler =

French operatic soprano (born 1958)

Françoise Kubler (born in 1958) is a French operatic soprano who has distinguished herself both as an interpreter of New Music and in the field of free improvisation.

== Career ==
Kubler, who studied at the Conservatoire de Strasbourg and then met Cathy Berberian and Dorothy Dorow, founded the ensemble Accroche Note in 1981 with Armand Angster, a formation which is mainly dedicated to improvisation. Her repertoire as a classical singer ranges from Franz Schubert to classical modernism and contemporary repertoire. She has worked with composers such as John Cage, Franco Donatoni, Iannis Xenakis, Robert Crumb and György Ligeti and renowned orchestras such as the Ensemble InterContemporain or the Ictus Ensemble, also conducted by Pierre Boulez, David Robertson and Peter Eötvös.

Kubler has premiered numerous vocal compositions, some of which are also available in their interpretation on records, for example by Ivo Malec, Marc Monnet, Georges Aperghis, James Dillon, Annette Schlünz and Luca Francesconi. She also worked with improvisers such as Jean-Pierre Drouet and Hélène Breschand. She teaches at the Strasbourg Conservatory.

== Selected discography ==
- Accroche Note En Concert (ANJ 1984, with Armand Angster, Barre Phillips, Jean-Michel Collet)
- Accroche Note Live in Berlin (FMP 1997, with Armand Angster)
- Drouet • Sclavis • Kubler A l’Improviste (Signature 2003)
