= Donnerstag aus Licht =

- Opera by Karlheinz Stockhausen
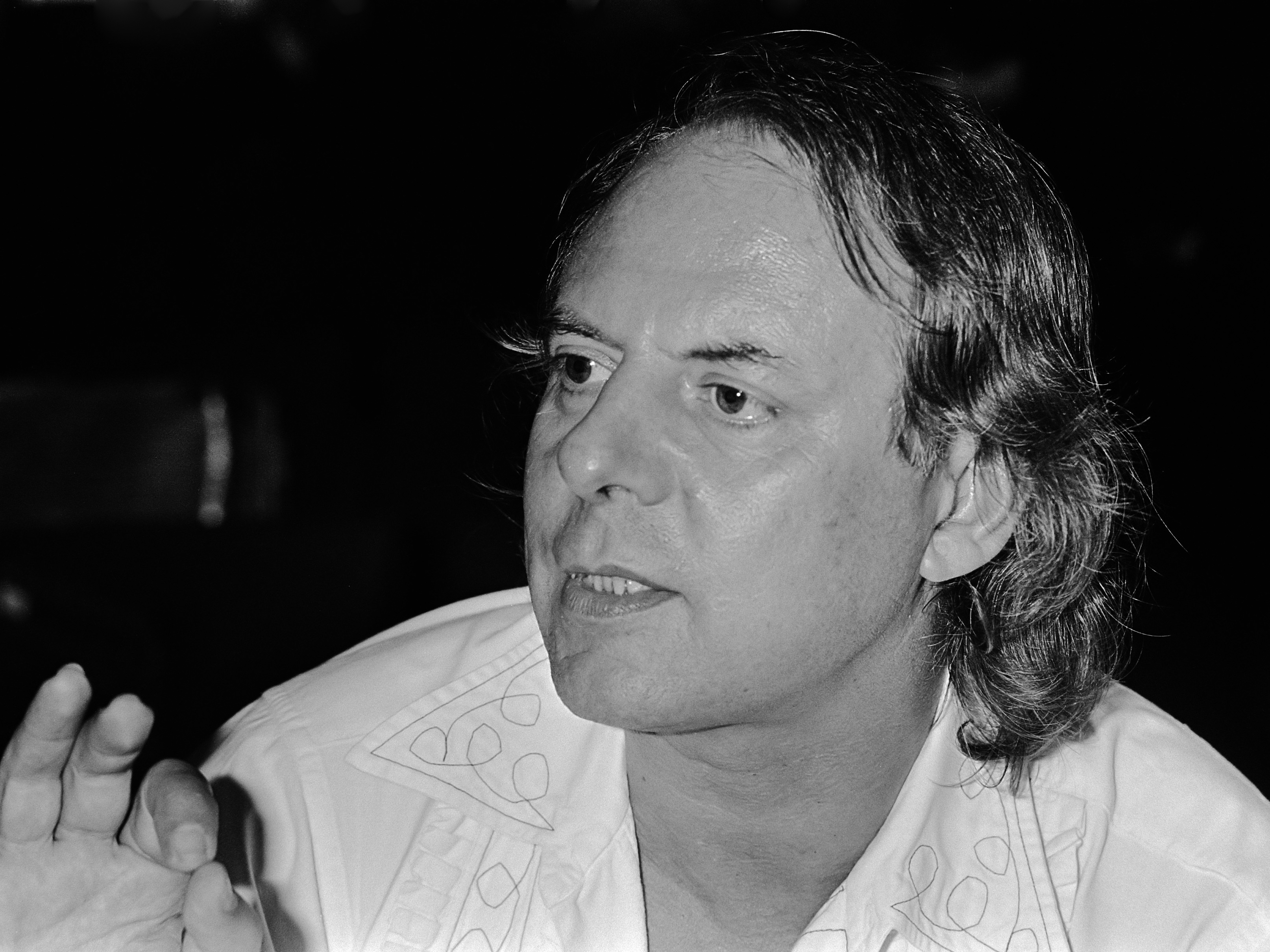
- Stockhausen rehearsing Michaels Heimkehr in 1980
- Librettist: Stockhausen
- Language: German
- Premiere: March 15, 1981; La Scala, Milan

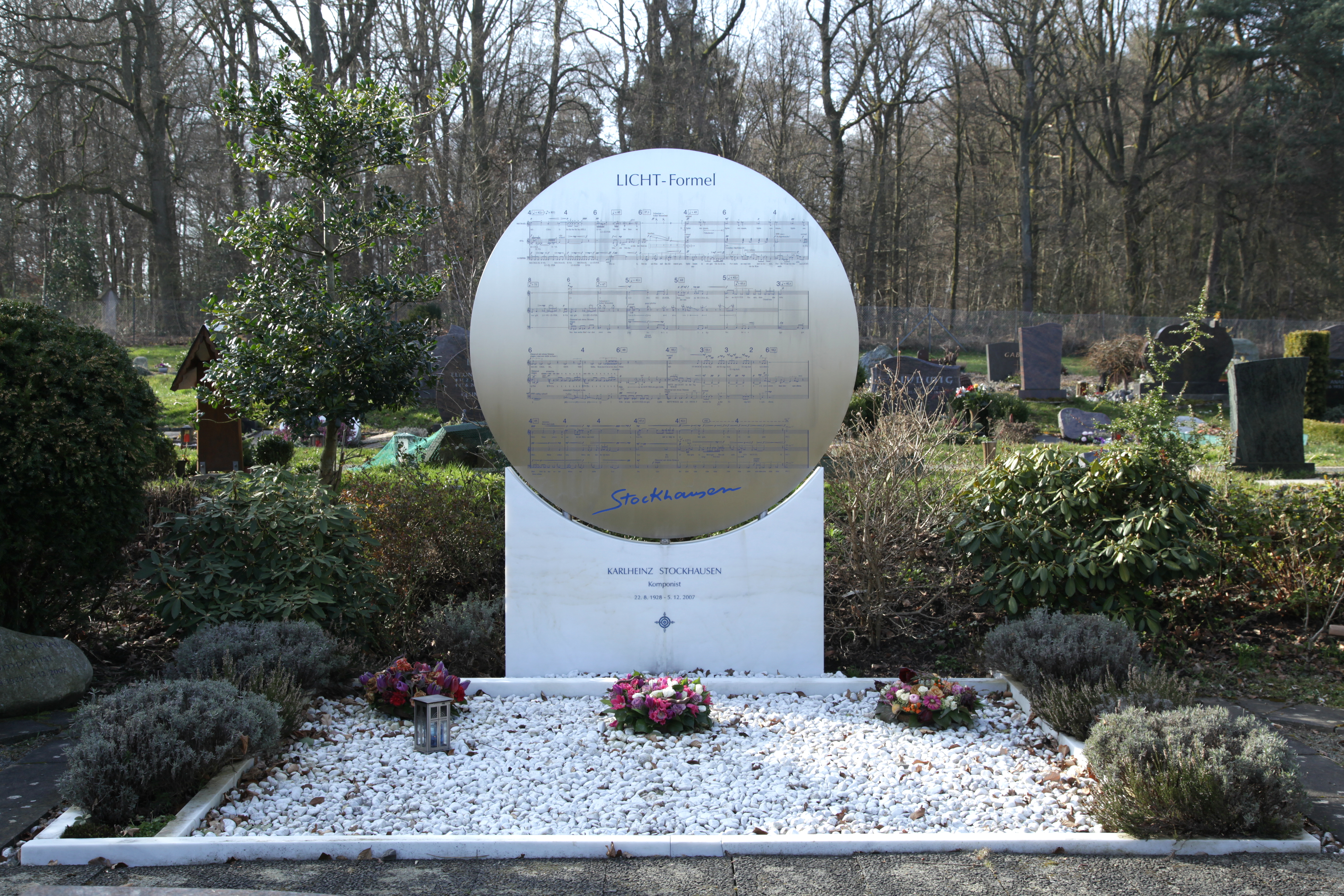
Karlheinz Stockhausens grave with the score to LICHT .

Donnerstag aus Licht (Thursday from Light) is an opera by Karlheinz Stockhausen in a greeting, three acts, and a farewell, and was the first of seven to be composed for the opera cycle Licht: die sieben Tage der Woche (Light: The Seven Days of the Week). It was written between 1977 and 1980, with a libretto by the composer.

Its second act, Michaels Reise um die Erde (Michael's Journey Around the Earth), has been performed and recorded individually.

== History ==
Donnerstag was given its staged premiere on 15 March 1981 by the La Scala Opera in the Teatro alla Scala in Milan, but without the third act, which had to be omitted due to a strike by the opera chorus of La Scala. They had demanded soloists' bonuses because of one brief passage in act 3, and had been turned down by the management. Further performances without the third act followed on 18, 21, 24, and 27 March. An agreement was finally reached and the complete opera was finally performed on 3 April, with two further performances on 5 and 7 April. The stage direction was by Luca Ronconi, with costume and stage design by Gae Aulenti. Scenic realisation was by Giorgio Cristini, lighting by Vannio Vanni, light compositions (act 3) by Mary Bauermeister. Péter Eötvös conducted, and played the Hammond organ in act 3, scene 2. Karlheinz Stockhausen was the sound projectionist.

On 19 December 1981, Donnerstag was awarded the Premio Critica Musicale F. Abbiati for "best new work of contemporary music".

A second staging was given by the Royal Opera, Covent Garden in London, on 16, 18, 20, 24, and 26 September 1985. The stage direction was by Michael Bogdanov, designed by Mari Bjornson, lighting and light compositions by Chris Ellis. Péter Eötvös conducted, and Stockhausen was the sound projectionist.

The second act, Michaels Reise um die Erde (Michael's Journey Around the Earth) was staged separately in 2008, by Carlus Padrissa of La Fura dels Baus, with stage direction by Roland Olbeter. It was performed by Marco Blaauw (trumpet), Nicola Jürgensen (basset horn), and musikFabrik, directed by Peter Rundel. Video was by Franc Aleu, dramaturgy by Thomas Ulrich, lighting by Frank Sobotta, and sound direction by Paul Jeukendrup. This was initially a production of the Wiener Taschenoper in collaboration with the Wiener Festwochen. In 2013, this production was revived for three performances at Avery Fisher Hall in New York as part of the Lincoln Center Festival, beginning appropriately on Thursday, 18 July.

A third production, by the American director Lydia Steier (dramaturgy: Pavel B. Jiracek), opened at the Basel Opera on 25 June 2016, with sets designed by Barbara Ehnes, costumes by Ursula Kudrna, and video effects by Chris Kondek. Paul Hübner performed the trumpeter-Michael, with Peter Tantsits, tenor, as the singer-Michael. Soprano Anu Komsi sang the part of the Mother, and bass Michael Leibundgut sang the Father.

Another production took place from 15 November to 19 November 2018 at the Opéra-Comique in Paris with Maxime Pascal as music director and staging by Benjamin Lazar. It was performed by Damien Bigourdan and Safir Behloul (both Michael as tenor), Henri Deléger (Michael as trumpeter), Iris Zerdoud (Eve as basset hornist), and Le Balcon (orchestra).

Donnerstag is an opera for 14 performers (3 voices, 8 instrumentalists, 3 dancers) plus a choir, an orchestra, and tapes. It was composed between 1977 and 1980. In the larger context of Licht, Thursday is Michael's day. Thursday's exoteric (primary) colour is bright blue, and its esoteric (secondary) colours are purple and violet. Thursday is also the day of plants.

== Roles ==
Roles, performer, premiere casts
Role	Performer	Premiere cast (La Scala, 1981)	London cast (1985)	Basel cast (2016)
Michael	tenor	Robert Gambill (act 1), Paul Sperry (act 3)	Julian Pike (Frieder Lang on 18 September)	Peter Tantsits (act 1), Rolf Romei (act 3)
Michael	trumpeter	Markus Stockhausen	Markus Stockhausen	Paul Hübner
Michael	dancer	Michèle Noiret	Michèle Noiret	Emmanuelle Grach
Eve	soprano	Annette Meriweather	Annette Meriweather	Anu Komsi
Eve	basset horn	Suzanne Stephens	Suzanne Stephens	Merve Kazokoğlu
Eve	dancer	Elizabeth Clarke	Elisabeth Clarke	Evelyn Angela Gugolz
Lucifer	bass	Matthias Hölle	Nicholas Isherwood	Michael Leibundgut
Lucifer	trombonist	Mark Tezak	Michael Svoboda	Stephen Menotti
Lucifer	dancer-mime	Alain Louafi	Alain Louafi	Eric Lamb
Michael's Accompanist	pianist	Majella Stockhausen	Majella Stockhausen	Ansi Verwey
Invisible Choirs	choir	WDR choir, Karlheinz Stockhausen, conductor (16-track recording)	WDR Choir, Stockhausen, conductor (16-track recording)	WDR Choir, Stockhausen, conductor (16-track recording)
Clownesque Pair of Swallows	clarinetists (2nd doubles basset horn)	Alain Damiens, Michel Arrignon	David Smeyers, Beate Zelinsky	Innhyuck Cho, Markus Forrer
Two Boys	soprano saxophonists	Hugo Read, Simon Stockhausen	Simon Stockhausen	Emilie Chabrol, Romain Chaumont
Old Woman	actress	Elena Pantano		
Messenger	tenor	Giovanni Mastino		
Penguins at the South Pole (act 2)	orchestra	Orchestra of the Teatro alla Scala, Péter Eötvös, conductor	Orchestra of the Royal Opera, Covent Garden, Péter Eötvös, conductor	Sinfonieorchester Basel, Titus Engel, conductor
Heavenly Choirs and Orchestra (act 3)	choir and orchestra	Orchestra and Choir of the Teatro alla Scala, Péter Eötvös, conductor	Orchestra and Choir of the Royal Opera, Covent Garden, Péter Eötvös, conductor	Chor des Theater Basel; Studierende der Hochschule für Musik FHNW/Musik-Akademie Basel; Sinfonieorchester Basel, Titus Engel, conductor

== Synopsis ==
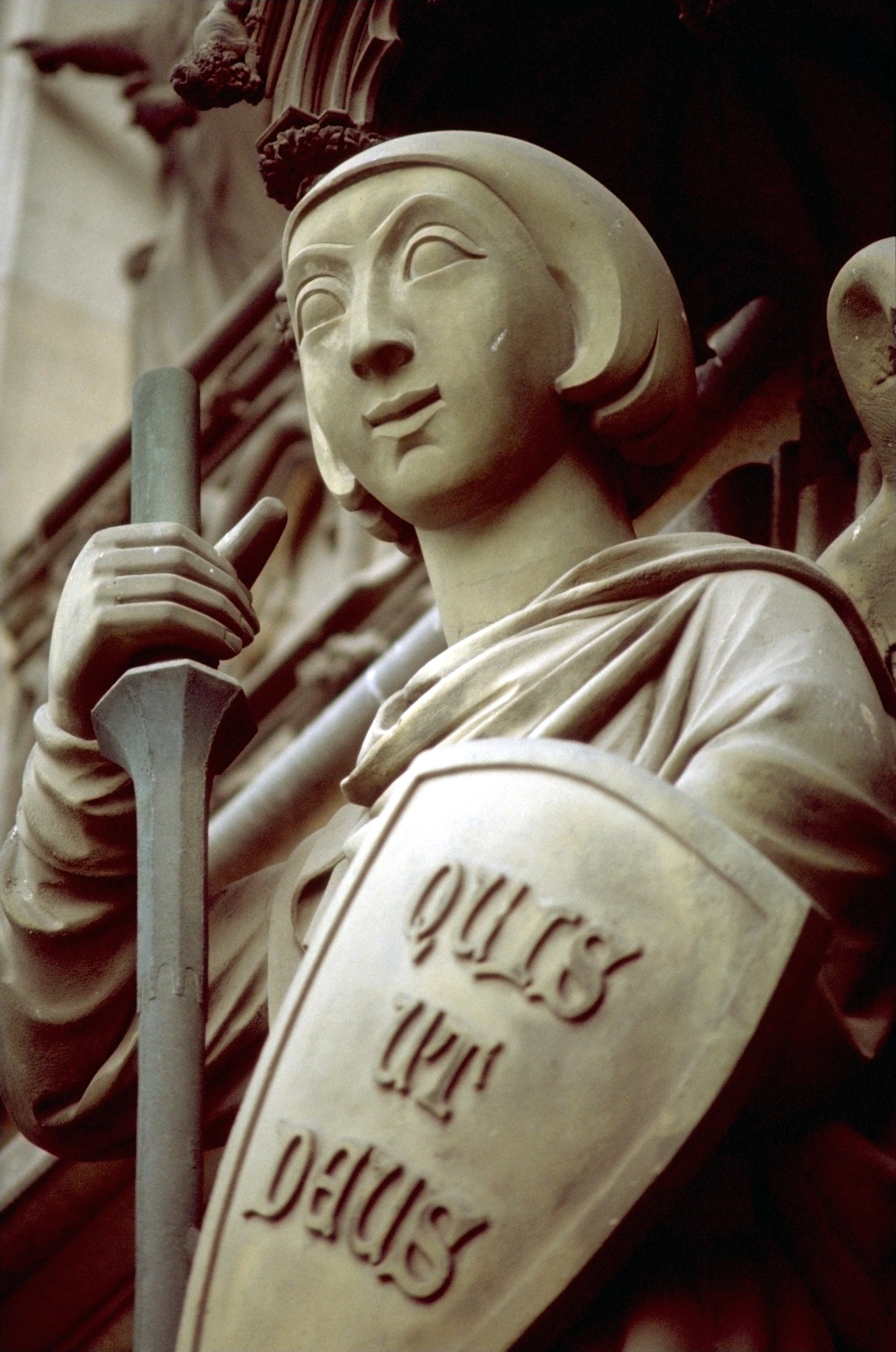
Archangel Michael, Cologne Cathedral, north portal

The time and place are universal.

=== Donnerstags-Gruß ===
The Thursday Greeting is performed in the foyer as the audience is arriving.

=== Act 1: Michaels Jugend ===
The first act consists of three scenes that follow one another without a break.

==== Scene 1: Kindheit ====
In "Childhood" Michael, a son of poor parents, demonstrates exceptional gifts. His father, a schoolteacher, teaches him to pray, hunt, shoot, and perform in theatre. From his mother he learns singing and merry-making, dancing—and seduction. His parents quarrel, and a younger brother, Hermannchen, dies in infancy. The mother goes mad, attempts suicide, and is hospitalised. The father turns to drink, and goes off to war.

==== Scene 2: Mondeva ====
In the forest, Michael encounters Mondeva (Moon-Eve), half woman, half bird, and falls in love with her. As he discovers how to control her music through erotic play, in a parallel scene Michael's mother is being killed by a doctor in an asylum.

==== Scene 3: Examen ====
Michael undergoes a triple admission examination to the conservatory. First as a singer, then as a trumpeter, and finally as a dancer, he amazes the jury, who enthusiastically admit him.

=== Act 2: Michaels Reise um die Erde ===
In the second act, Michael undertakes a journey around the world in what is essentially a trumpet concerto with orchestra, performed in a huge rotating globe set against a starry firmament. There are seven "stations" along the way, at each of which the music takes on colour from the locale: Germany, New York, Japan, Bali, India, Central Africa, and Jerusalem. Michael's formula gradually evolves from a simple beginning form to increasingly florid extravagance, finally shattering into incoherent fragments in stations 5 and 6. When he reaches Central Africa, Michael hears a distant basset horn, and orders the globe to stop turning. Michael commands the earth to rotate in reverse as the seventh station, Jerusalem, is reached, and he begins a new process of rehabilitation in a therapeutic conversation with a double-bass player. Mondeva appears, and they perform a duet in which their melodic formulas merge and intertwine until each plays the other's formula. Two clownish clarinet players, costumed as a pair of swallows, mock and—together with the orchestral low brass, an emblem of Lucifer—"crucify" him, after which the act ends with a musical "ascension" in which the sounds of the trumpet and basset horn circle around until they are united in a trill.)

=== Act 3: Michaels Heimkehr ===
In the third act Michael—in his threefold manifestation as tenor, trumpeter, and dancer—returns to his celestial home.

==== Scene 1: Festival ====
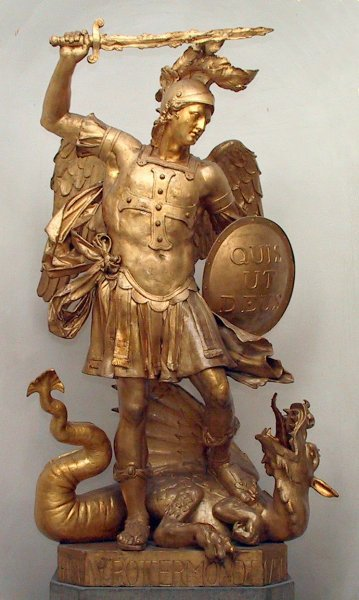
Michael fighting the Dragon (Bonn University, main entrance)

As the invisible choirs sing all around, he is welcomed by Eve—also in threefold form as soprano, basset hornist, and dancer—five choirs (delegates from various parts of the Michael Universe), five orchestral groups, and a background string orchestra.

- "Meditation". Eve presents Michael with a gift of three plants, and another of three compositions of light:
- "First Light Composition: Chaos out of Colours"
- "Second Light Composition: Suns out of Chaos"
- "Third Light Composition: Chaos from Colours"
  - Part 1: "Moons"
  - Part 2: "Moons and Glassy Images"
  - Part 3: "Starry Sky". The signs of the Zodiac appear, one after another, from Aquarius to Capricorn. Suddenly, an old lady steps forward and demands, "Why don't you all come home!" The choirs answer her: "There is no 'home'. Even angels are always on the move". Eve presents Michael with a final gift, a terrestrial globe as a souvenir of his journey around the earth. Lucifer appears, first as a gremlin who springs out of the globe and presents Michael with his own, smaller blue globe. Michael passes it around to the choir, which infuriates the gremlin, who makes threatening gestures and summons assistance.
- "Michael's Battle with the Dragon". Lucifer reappears in a second form, as a tap-dancing trombonist dressed as a torero with a black cape and hat, and the gremlin turns into a dragon. Michael gives battle and the dragon, wounded many times, sinks to the ground. Michael borrows the conductor's long baton to deliver the coup de grâce. The dragon tries one last time to rise, but falls on his belly. The trombonist, too, staggers and falls on his back, legs in the air.
- "Boys' Duet", played by two angelic soprano saxophonists.
- "Argument". A messenger arrives to announce that Lucifer is once again causing trouble. Lucifer reappears, now in triple form as a bass singer, a trombonist, and a dancer-mime, and taunts Michael, who dismisses him: "You have lost. You have corrupted your wisdom through your bitter irony, poisonous sarcasm now fills your heart. ... You are no longer immortal, Lucifer! ... Can't you just once allow us to celebrate a festival in peace?" Lucifer can only go away muttering in disgust, "You fool! You fool!" as the scene ends.

==== Scene 2: Vision ====
In a process of 15 cyclical transpositions, Michael explains (in threefold appearance as singer, trumpeter, and dancer), his experience and opposition to Lucifer.

=== Donnerstags-Abschied ===
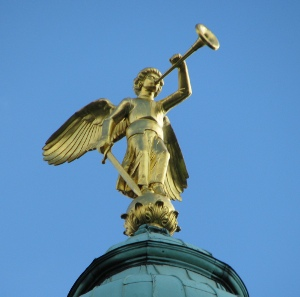
Archangel Michael as trumpeter (Christuskirche, Mannheim)

The Thursday Farewell (also called "Michael's Farewell") is performed outside the opera house following the performance, by five trumpeters who begin as the last scene, Vision, is concluding. They are costumed as Michael and positioned on the rooftops or on balconies surrounding the square, floodlit like statues on a tower. They each repeat one segment of the Michael formula, with long pauses between repetitions, for about 30 minutes, withdrawing at the end in the order in which their respective segments occur in the formula.

=== Unsichtbare Chöre ===
The Invisible Choirs are played back in the theatre over eight channels throughout most of act 1, and again in act 3, scene 1, and is composed in such a way that they could never be sung by a choir live, in part because there are as many as 180 separate voices, and in part because of the demands of polyphonic synchronicity, exactness of intonation, and dynamic balance. There are three texts sung in Hebrew ("Judgement Day" from The Ascent of Moses, "The End of Time" from the Apocalypse of Baruch, and a Hymn of Praise, "The Heavens Rejoice", from the Book of Leviticus), as well as a different passage from "The End of Time", sung in German.

== Critical reception ==
The staged premiere of Donnerstag was very well received in Italy, where it was awarded the Italian Music Critics' Prize for best new work, in December 1981. The German press reception, on the other hand, was harsh and often ad hominem. The Covent Garden production in 1985 also provoked contrary points of view in the press, in part divided over the question of the music versus the theatrical conception. Paul Griffiths, writing in the Times, for example, found that "it contains much quite extraordinary music" but "the opera never for a moment works as the mystic revelation it pretends to be. ... It is very wondrous to contemplate—wondrous, that is, when it is not just silly". Andrew Porter, on the contrary, found the "variety of forces, forms, textures, and matter ... a strength and a pleasure", and the "somewhat ramshackle construction saves the work from solemn pretentiousness. There's even a playful quality about much of it, although its essential seriousness is not in doubt and inner musical integrity is not compromised". Porter concludes,

hearing and seeing the drama is an engrossing, enjoyable, and elevating adventure. Ear, mind, and spirit are engaged. And, as I suggested, moments of jokiness, naïveté—silliness, even—save the work from being unbearably solemn: Stockhausen-Sarastro has a vein of Papageno in him. There is a great deal to listen to and to watch. Some of the spans, especially in the last scene, are traversed slowly. But things happen; the music doesn't fall into simplistic repetitions or numbing stasis. There are counterpoints to follow. There are supple melodies and rich harmonies. There are wonderful sounds—new and stirring sounds. The score is a culmination of the marvellous musics—in whose making Michael's vision, Lucifer's technical skills, and the inspiration of Eve's love seem to have conspired—that have poured from Stockhausen during the last thirty years. ... But what matters most now is the excitement of entering this huge, ambitious work, responding to its sounds and sights, trying to understand it, and feeling, perhaps, that it is—by intention at least—something like a Divine Comedy and a Comédie Humaine in one.

== Discography ==
- Stockhausen: Donnerstag aus Licht. Annette Meriweather (soprano); Robert Gambill, Michael Angel, Paul Sperry (tenors); Matthias Hölle (bass); Elizabeth Clarke, Alain Louafi (speakers); Markus Stockhausen (trumpet); Suzanne Stephens (basset horn); Alain Damiens (clarinet); Michel Arrignon (clarinet and basset horn); Hugo Read, Simon Stockhausen (soprano saxophones); Mark Tezak (trombone); Majella Stockhausen (piano); Ensemble InterContemporain; Choir of the West German Radio, Cologne; Hilversum Radio Choir; Péter Eötvös (conductor and Hammond organ); Karlheinz Stockhausen (conductor and sound projection). DG 2740 272 (4 LPs); DGG 423 379-2 (4CDs). Hamburg: Polydor International, 1983. Reissued Stockhausen Complete Edition, CD 30 A–D (4CDs). Kürten: Stockhausen-Verlag, 1992.
- Schöpfung und Erschöpfung. Musik in Deutschland 1950–2000. Mauricio Kagel; Karlheinz Stockhausen. CD. 74321 73635 2. [Munich]: BMG Ariola Classics, 2003. Includes Examen, act 1 scene 3 from Donnerstag aus Licht (Julian Pike, tenor; Markus Stockhausen, trumpet; Suzanne Stephens, basset horn; Majella Stockhausen, piano; Annette Meriweather, soprano; Nicholas Isherwood, bass; Elizabeth Clarke and Alain Louafi, speakers; Karlheinz Stockhausen, sound projection.
- Karlheinz Stockhausen: Unsichtbare Chöre / Invisible Choirs /Chœrs Invisibles vom / from / de Donnerstag aus Licht. West German Radio Chorus (prepared by Herbert Schernus, Godfried Ritter, Karlheinz Stockhausen); Suzanne Stephens (clarinets); Karlheinz Stockhausen (musical direction, sound projectionm and tape mixdown). DG (LP) 419432-1; CD 419 432-2. Hamburg: Polydor International, 1986. Reissued, Stockhausen Complete Edition CD 31. Kürten: Stockhausen-Verlag, 1992.
- Karlheinz Stockhausen: Michaels Reise um die Erde: Solisten-Version für einen Trompeter, 9 Mitspieler und Klangregisseur (1977/78). Markus Stockhausen (trumpet), Suzanne Stephens (basset horn), Ian Stuart (clarinet), Lesley Schatzberger (clarinet and basset horn), Michael Svoboda (trombone and baritone horn), Kathinka Pasveer (alto flute), Andreas Boettger (percussion), Isao Nakamura (percussion), Michael Obst, Simon Stockhausen (synthesizers), Karlheinz Stockhausen (sound projection). ECM New Series 1406 437 188-2 (Japan release CD POCC-1008). Munich: ECM Records GmbH, 1992.
- Karlheinz Stockhausen Musik für Klarinette, Baßklarinette, Bassetthorn: Suzee Stephens spielt 15 Kompositionen. With Kathinka Pasveer (alto flute), Joachim Krist (viola), Majella Stockhausen (piano), Julian Pike (tenor), Markus Stockhausen (trumpet), and Simon Stockhausen (synthesizer). (Includes Tanze Luzefa! for basset horn, Bijou for alto flute, bass clarinet, and tape, Mondeva for tenor and basset horn, and Mission unf Himmelfahrt for trumpet and basset horn, all from Donnerstag aus Licht.) Stockhausen Complete Edition CD 32 A–C (3 CDs). Kürten: Stockhausen-Verlag, 1994.
- Markus Stockhausen Plays Karlheinz Stockhausen. Markus Stockhausen (trumpet), Nick de Groot (double bass), Annette Meriweather (soprano). (Halt from Michaels Reise um die Erde, for trumpet and double bass; Aries from Sirius, for trumpet and electronic music; In Freundschaft for trumpet; Pietà from Dienstag aus Licht for flugelhorn and soprano.) EMI Classics (CD) 5 56645 2. Cologne: EMI Electrola GmbH, 1998. Reissued Stockhausen Complete Edition CD 60. Kürten: Stockhausen-Verlag.
- Karlheinz Stockhausen: Bass Clarinet and Piano. Volker Hemken (bass clarinet), Steffen Schleiermacher (piano). (Tanze Luzefa!, from Michaels Jugend, act 1 of Donnerstag aus Licht; Klavierstücke VII, VIII, and IX; In Freundschaft for bass clarinet; Tierkreis for bass clarinet and piano, with toy piano and music box.) DG Scene (CD) MDG 613 1451-2. Detmold: Dabringhaus und Grimm Audiovision, 2007.
- Stockhausen: Michael's Farewell. John Wallace (trumpet), Andrew Powell (live electronics). (Karlheinz Stockhausen, Michael's Farewell from Donnerstag aus Licht; Andrew Powell, Plasmogeny II; Roger Smalley, Echo III; Tim Souster, The Transistor Radio of St. Narcissus.) Deux-Elles CD DXL 1039. Reading: Deux-Elles Limited, 2002.
- Tara Bouman, Klarinette, Bassetthorn: Contemporary. (CD) DeutschlandRadio Aktivraum AR 50101. Cologne: Aktivraum Musik, 2003. Includes Mission und Himmelfahrt from Michaels Reise um die Erde, from Donnerstag aus Licht, with Markus Stockhausen (trumpet).
- Michael Duke, Duo Sax: Music for Two Saxophones. Barry Cockcroft: Slap Me; Pierre-Max Dubois: Six Caprices; Paul Hindemith: Konzertstück; Steven Galante: Saxsounds III (Diminishing Returns); Karlheinz Stockhausen: Knabenduett; Christian Lauba: Ars; Bruno Maderna: Dialodia; Paul Stanhope: Air; Samuel Adler: Contrasting Inventions; Martin Kay: Honey; John David Lamb: Barefoot Dances. Michael Duke (all tracks), Jeff Emerich (Cockcraft, Hindemith, Galante), Michael Lichnovsky (Stockhausen, Lauba, Maderna, Adler), Martin Kay (Kay), Anna Duke (Lamb). (CD) Saxophone Classics CC4006. London: Saxophone Classics, 2012.
- Karlheinz Stockhausen: Michaels Reise um die Erde. Marco Blaauw (trumpet), Musikfabrik NRW, Peter Rundel (conductor). Live recording 2008. Wergo (CD) WER 6858 2. Mainz: Wergo, 2012.
- Scriabin|Stockhausen: Light. Vanessa Benelli Mosell, piano. Decca 481 2491 (CD). [Klavierstück XII: Examination from Thursday from Light (recorded November 2015).] London: Decca Music Group Limited, 2016.

== Filmography ==
- Davies, Russell (presenter). 1985. Arts Review. Segment "Opera: Donnerstag by Karlheinz Stockhausen" includes studio discussion with Bernard Williams, Judith Weir, and Michael Nyman, and a filmed interview with Stockhausen by Peter Heyworth. BBC2 (21 September, 7:40–8:30pm).
- Examen vom Donnerstag aus Licht. José Montes-Baquer, dir. Cologne: WDR, 1990.
- Michaels Reise um die Erde. Markus Stockhausen (trumpet), Symphony Orchestra of the RAI Rome, Karlheinz Stockhausen (conductor). Rome: RAI, 1979.
- Michaels Reise um die Erde. Soloists' Version. Cologne: WDR, 1990.
- Michaels Reise um die Erde. Marco Blaauw (Michael, trumpet), Nicola Jürgensen (Eve, basset horn), Carl Rosman and Fie Schouten (Swallow pair, clarinets). Carlus Padrissa, stage director. Roland Olbeter, art director. Chu Uroz, costumes. MusikFabrik, Peter Rundel, conductor. Thomas Ulrich, script editor. János S. Darvas, director. WDR for Wiener Festwochen, 2009.
