= Samstag aus Licht =

1984 opera by Karlheinz Stockhausen

- Opera by Karlheinz Stockhausen
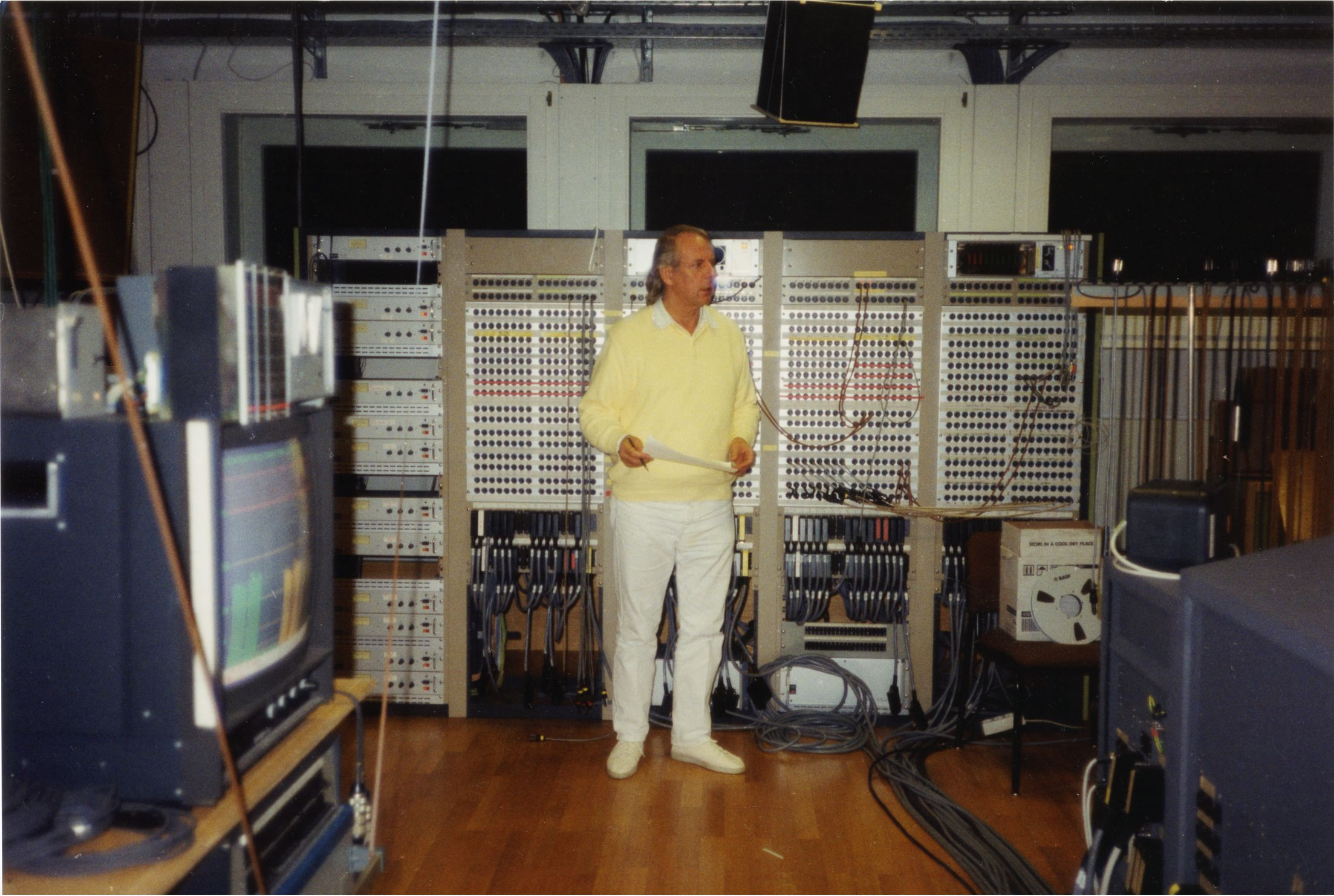
- Stockhausen in the WDR Studio, 1991
- Librettist: Stockhausen
- Language: German
- Premiere: May 25, 1984; Palazzo dello Sport in Milan, by La Scala

Samstag aus Licht (Saturday from Light) is an opera by Karlheinz Stockhausen in a greeting and four scenes, and was the second of seven to be composed for the opera cycle Licht: die sieben Tage der Woche (Light: The Seven Days of the Week). It was written between 1981 and 1983, to a libretto written by the composer and incorporating a text by Saint Francis of Assisi, and was first staged in Milan in 1984.

== History ==
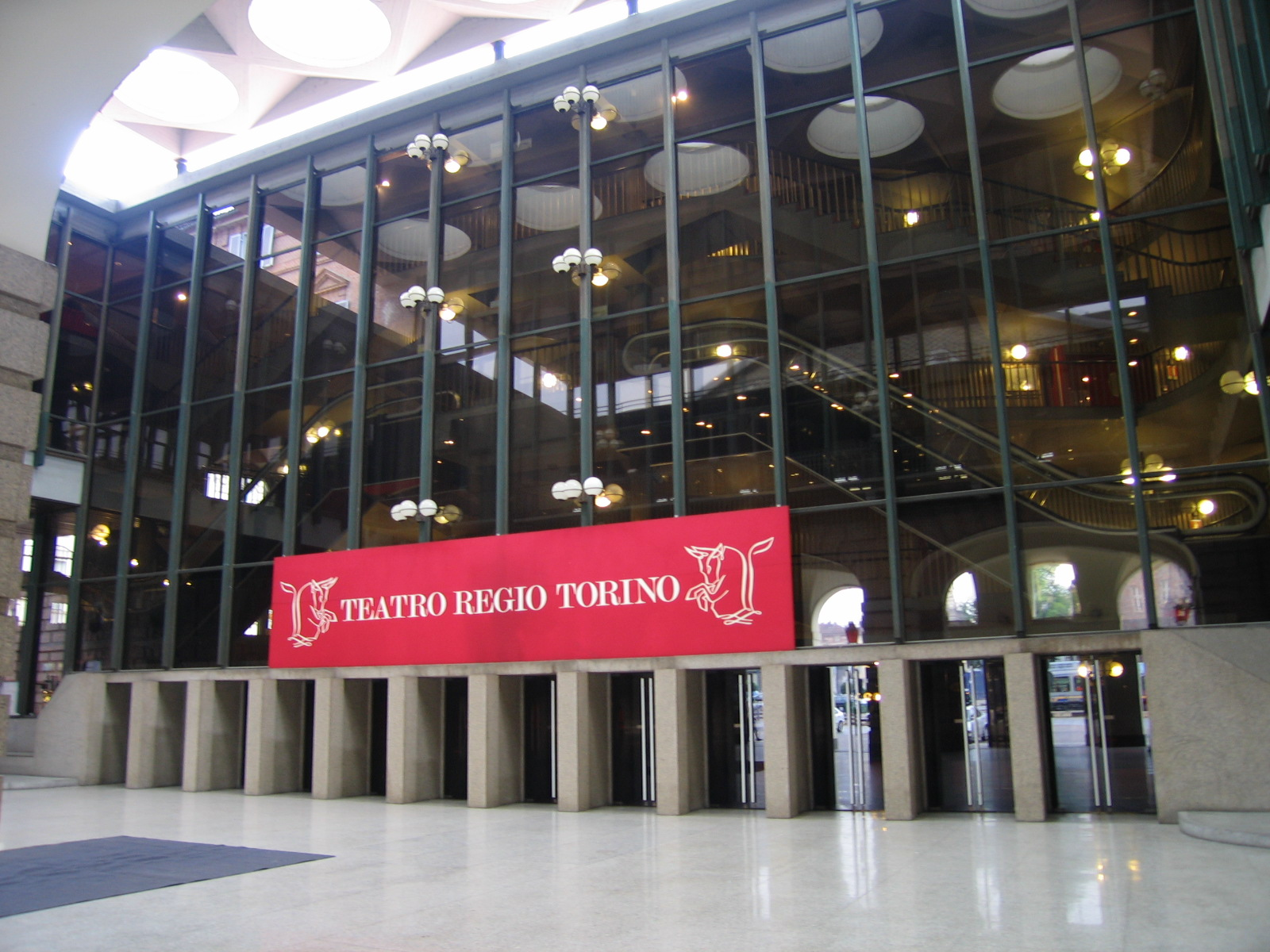
Teatro Regio, Turin, where Klavierstück XIII was premiered in 1982

Samstag is an opera for 13 solo performers (1 voice, 10 instrumentalists, and 2 dancers) plus a symphonic band (or symphony orchestra), ballet or mimes, and male choir with organ. It was composed between 1981 and 1983. Saturday is Lucifer's day. Saturday's exoteric colour is black.

The first scene, Lucifer's Dream, was composed between May and September 1981 as a commission for the 10ème Rencontres Internationales de Musique Contemporaines Metz 1981. The score is dedicated, on the occasion of her twentieth birthday, to the composer's daughter Majella who, together with the bass Matthias Hölle, premiered the work in the Théâtre Municipal Metz on 19 November 1981. A second version of this work, without the bass voice, is Stockhausen's Klavierstück XIII. In this form it was premiered by Majella Stockhausen on 10 June 1982 in the Teatro Regio in Turin.

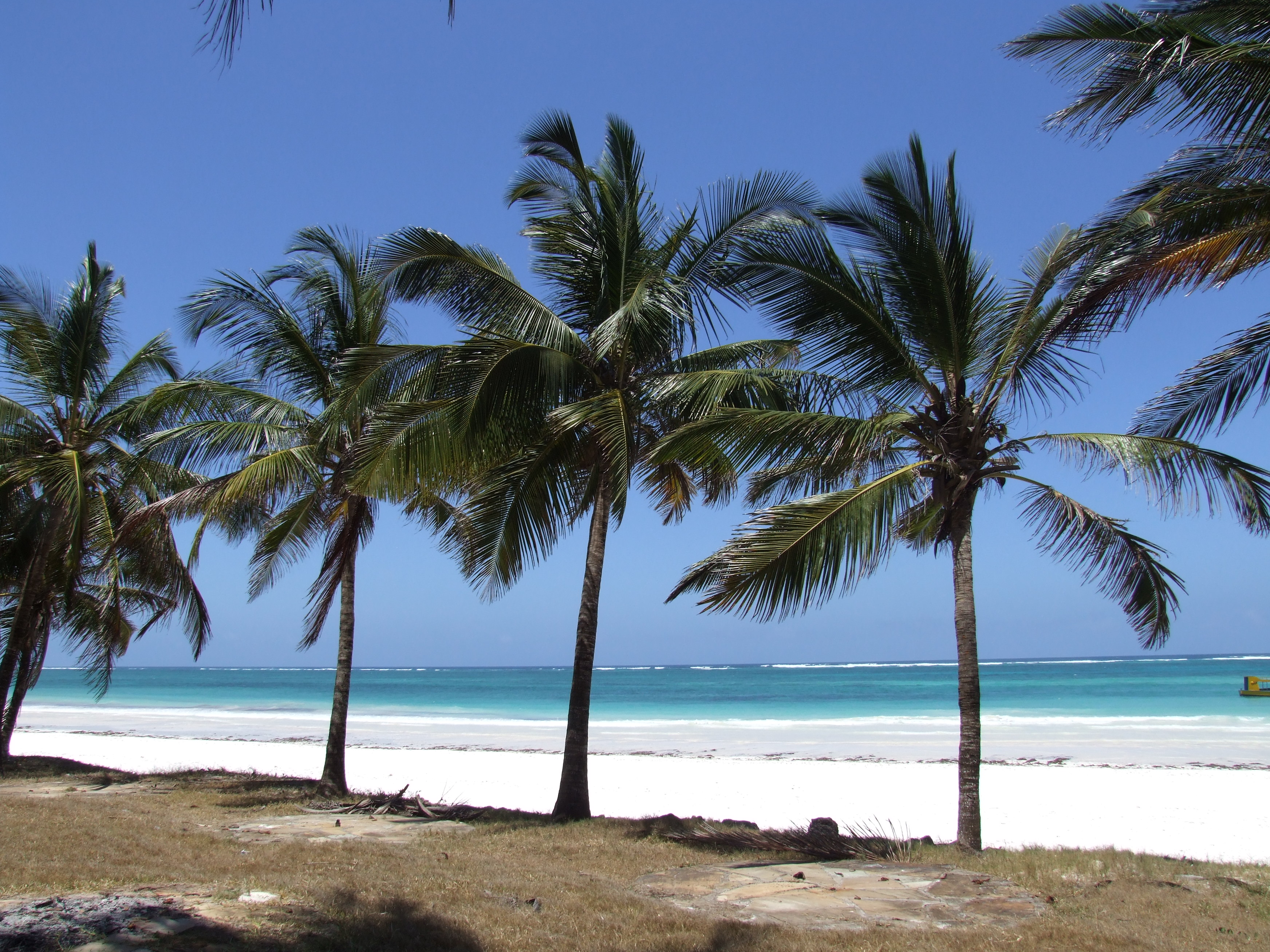
Diani Beach, Kenya, where Kathinkas Gesang was composed in 1983

Kathinka's Chant as Lucifer's Requiem was commissioned by the Südwestfunk Baden-Baden for the Donaueschingen Musiktage, where it was given its concert premiere on 15 October 1983 by Kathinka Pasveer (flute) and the Kolberg Percussion Ensemble. Pasveer also performed in the staged premiere at La Scala on 25 May 1984, but with the Slagwerkgroep Den Haag. The work was composed in collaboration with Pasveer in February and March 1983 at Diani Beach near Mombasa, Kenya. In May 1983 Stockhausen planned an alternate version of Kathinkas Gesang for flute and six-channel electronic music. In collaboration with Marc Battier, he realised this version using Giuseppe Digiugnio's synthétiseur 4X at IRCAM in Paris, in December 1983 and August 1984. A third version, for flute with five-channel recording of piano sounds and a live, concertante piano also exists, but has not yet been premiered. The work can also be performed as an unaccompanied flute solo.

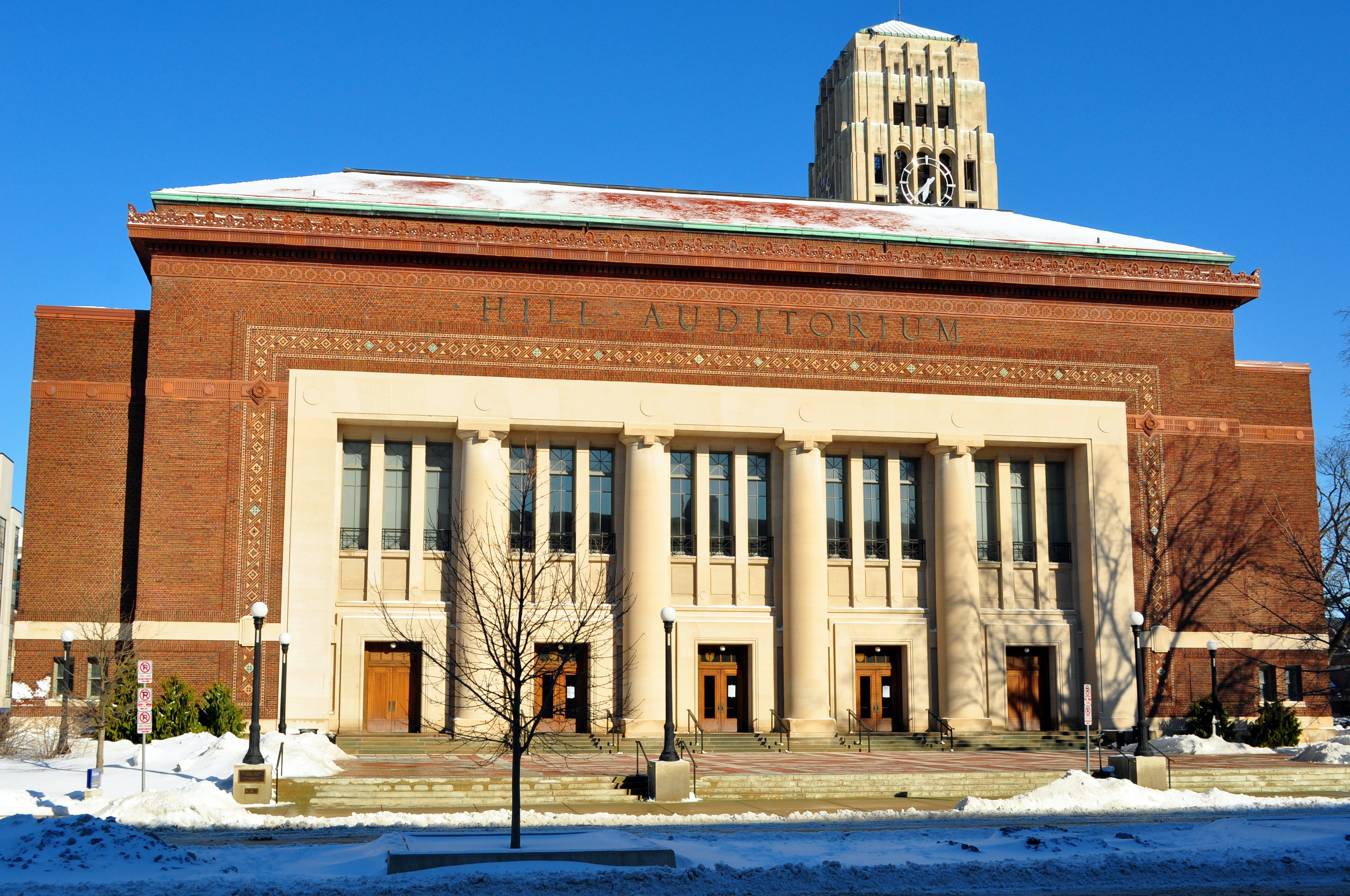
Hill Auditorium, Ann Arbor, where Luzifers Tanz was premiered on 9 March 1984

The opera's third scene, Lucifer's Dance, was commissioned by the University of Michigan Symphony Band and their conductor, H. Robert Reynolds, who appeared in the staged premiere in Milan on 25 May 1984 after having given the concert premiere on 9 March 1984 in Hill Auditorium, Ann Arbor, with Luis Maldonado (euphonium), Markus Stockhausen (piccolo trumpet), Kathinka Pasveer (piccolo), and Laurence Kaptain (percussion). The score was composed from May to December 1983, and also exists in a version for symphony orchestra, which was first performed in the broadcasting hall of Radio Freies Berlin on 17 and 18 October 1987, by the Radio Symphony Orchestra with Michael Svoboda (euphonium), Markus Stockhausen, Kathinka Pasveer, and Andreas Boettger (percussion), conducted by the composer.

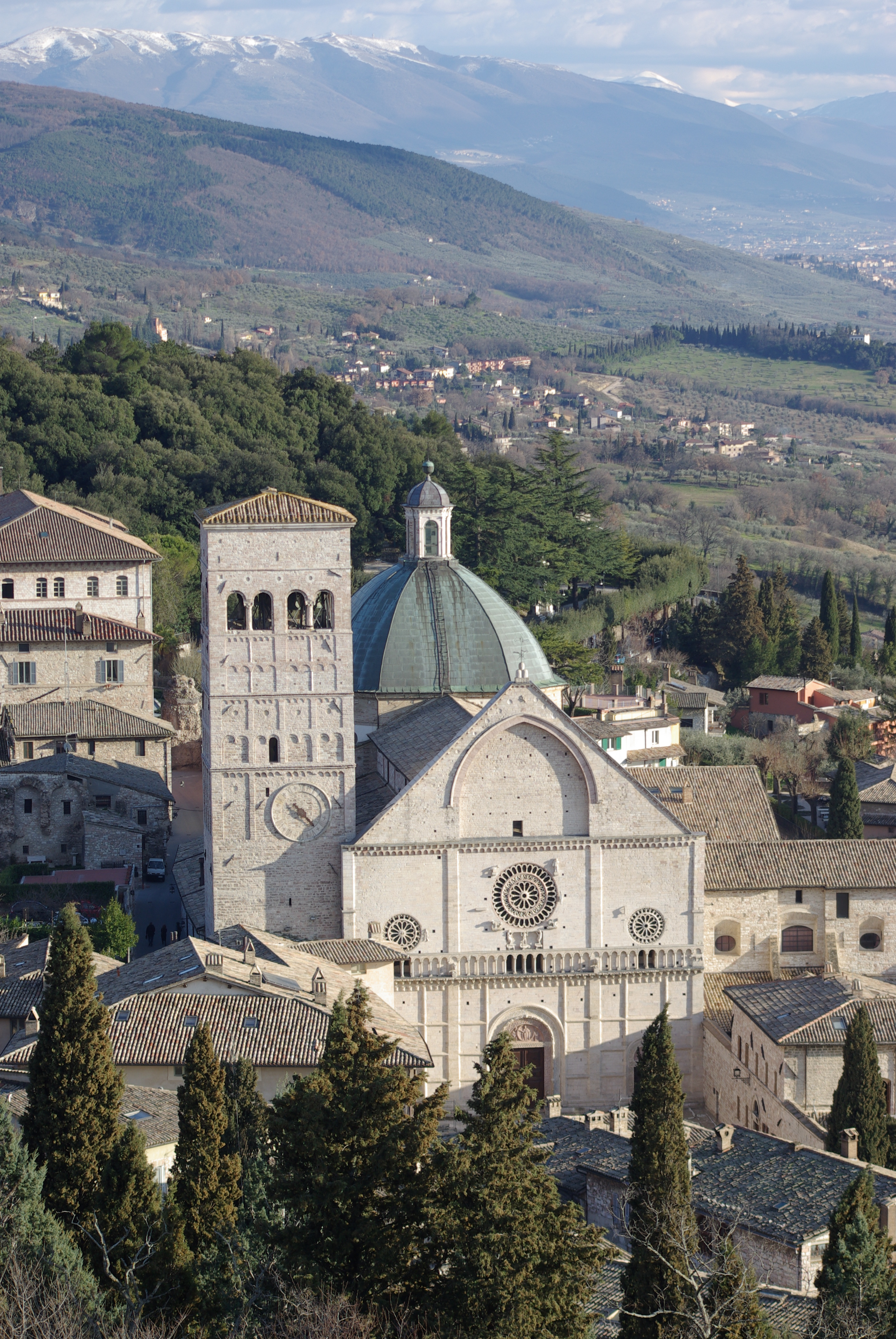
Chiesa di San Rufino, Assisi, where Luzifers Abschied was premiered

Lucifer's Farewell was commissioned by the Associazione Sagra Musicale Umbra for the 800th anniversary of Saint Francis of Assisi, and was composed in August 1982. It is dedicated to Francesco Siciliani. The separate premiere of Lucifer's Farewell was performed by the Händel Collegium Köln on 28 September 1982 in the Chiesa di San Rufino in Assisi, where St. Francis was baptised. They were accompanied by Helmut Volke (Hammond organ) and seven trombonists led by Michael Struck.

Samstag was given its staged premiere by the Teatro alla Scala on 25 May 1984, in the Palazzo dello Sport in Milan. Subsequent performances were on 26, 29, 30, and 31 May. The stage direction was by Luca Ronconi and Ugo Tessitore, with costume and stage design by Gae Aulenti. Karlheinz Stockhausen was the sound projectionist.

A second staging was presented in Paris on 28 and 29 June 2019 by the ensemble Le Balcon, the first three scenes at the Cité de la musique and scene 4 at the Église Saint-Jacques-Saint-Christophe de la Villette. Maxime Pascal was the music director, stage direction was by Damien Bigourdan, costumes by Pascale Lavandier, and sound projection by Florent Derex.)

== Roles ==
Role	Performer	Premiere cast	2019 Paris cast
Lucifer	bass	Matthias Hölle	Damien Pass
Lucifer	stilt dancer	Adriano and Sebastiano Vianello (alternating)	—
Diabolical Wind-Player	trombonist	Michael Struck	Mathieu Adam
Lucifer's Dream-Player	pianist	Majella Stockhausen	Alphonse Cemin
Black Cat Kathinka	flautist	Kathinka Pasveer	Claire Luquiens
The Six Mortal Senses	percussionists	Slagwerkgroep den Haag	Alice Caubit, Akino Kamiya, Frédéric Blondy, Arthur Lavandier, Othman Louati, Clotilde Lacroix (percussionists)
Giant Human Face	wind orchestra	University of Michigan Symphony Band, H. Robert Reynolds, cond.	Le Balcon; Orchestre d'harmonie du Conservatoire à rayonnement régional de Paris
Ribbon Dancer	dancer	Kama Dev	Emmanuelle Grach
Wing-of-the-Nose	solo percussion	Laurence Kaptain	François-Xavier Plancqueel
Michael	piccolo trumpeter	Markus Stockhausen	Henri Deléger
Sovrintendente	actor	Piero Mazzarella	—
Monks	male choir	Händel Collegium Köln, Dieter Gutknecht, dir.	Chœur de l'armée française, Émilie Fleury, dir.
Wild Black Bird	wild black bird	Himself	Himself

== Synopsis ==
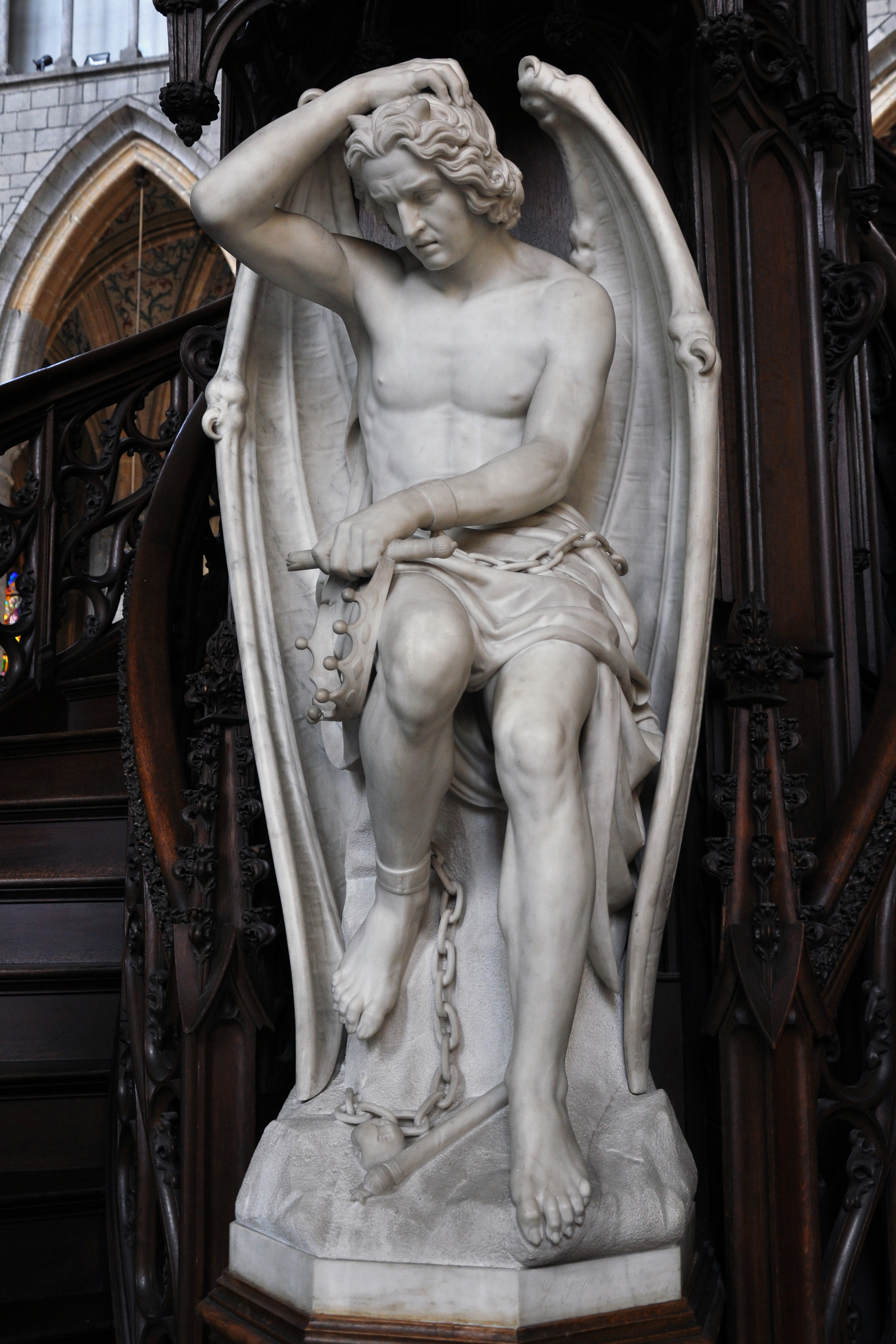
Lucifer, by Guillaume Geefs, Cathédrale Saint-Paul, Liège

The four scenes of Samstag clearly present in concentrated form a process of the opening of space and the liberation of sound. The first scene has the most restricted space, with just two characters appearing from nothingness. The second scene expands into the centre area, left and right, with seven characters (flute and six percussionists). The third scene layers everyone in the vertical dimension with a stilt dancer and a wind band in six levels, forming a gigantic face. Finally, the fourth scene presents both static and rotating events surrounding the audience, as well as diagonal movements, and the release of a wild bird who flies away. The four scenes do not have a traditional dramatic structure, but rather present a succession of dramatic situations that are discontinuous amongst themselves. This is an example of what the composer called moment form, in which the surface events give the impression of entirely different situations, held together by the structural connections of the music.

=== Samstags-Gruß ===
The Saturday Greeting is performed from the four cardinal points of the theatre by 26 brass players divided into four choirs, two of which each have an added percussionist. The opening of space characteristic of the opera is forecast in the gradual intervallic expansion in thirteen phases from an opening major third toward an interval of an octave plus a major seventh. The musical content is derived from the opera's third scene, Lucifer's Dance, specifically from the section with the text "Augen gegen Augen" (eye against eye), which similarly involves four groups of the wind orchestra.

=== Scene 1: Luzifers Traum ===
In the opening scene, Lucifer dreams Klavierstück XIII, a composition in five temporal layers with increasing "compressions of figures of human music, extensions and rests, for the abolition of time". Toward the end he listens, enraptured, to a simple melody, fends it off, enjoys it, again wards it off, and finally succumbs and dies a feigned death.

=== Scene 2: Kathinkas Gesang als Luzifers Requiem ===
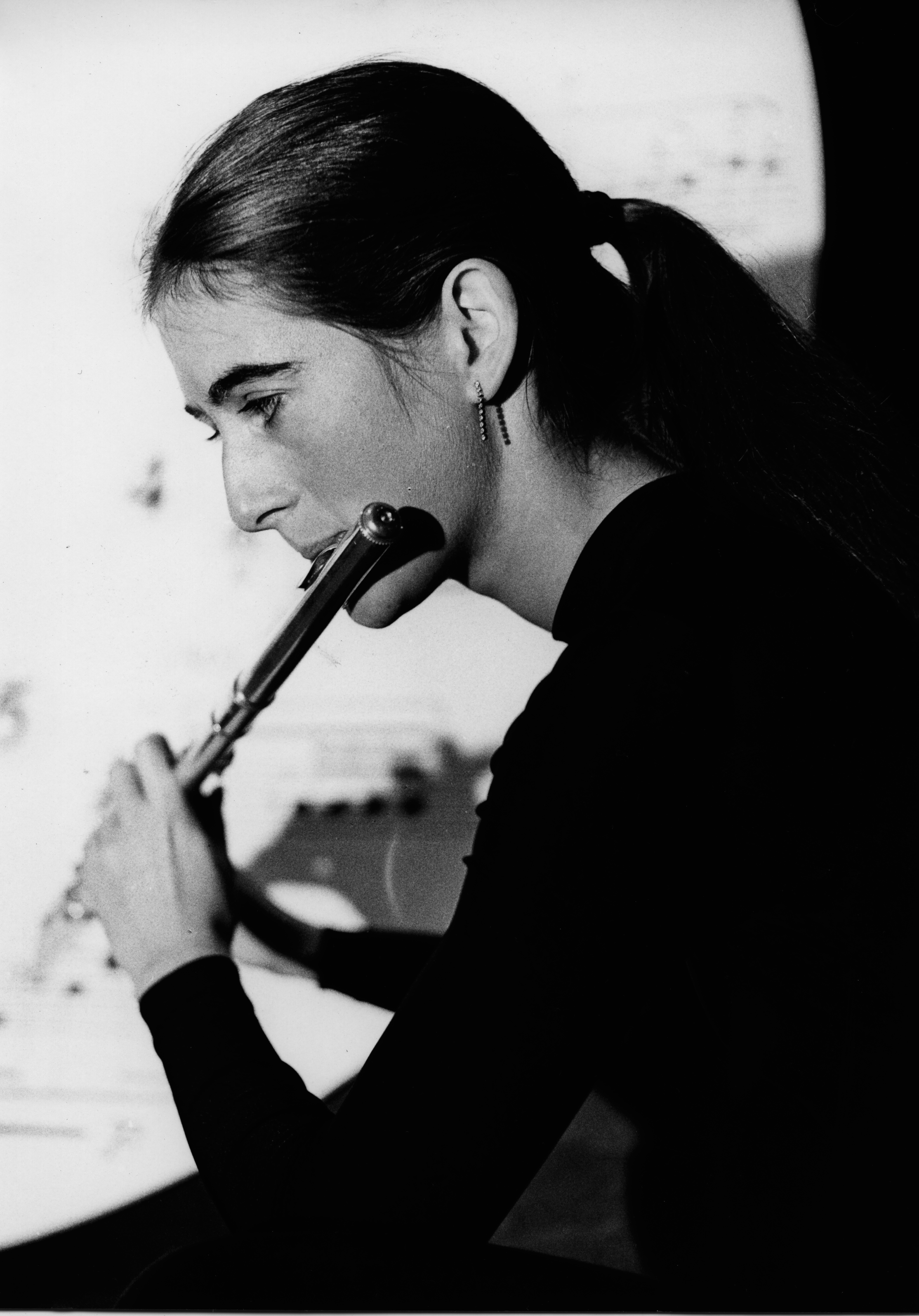
Kathinka Pasveer performing Kathinkas Gesang als Luzifers Requiem at the Donaueschinger Musiktage, 15 October 1983

Lucifer's Requiem is a Requiem for every person who seeks the eternal light. In Kathinka's Chant, Kathinka sings with flute and voice at Lucifer's grave a chant that protects the soul of the deceased by means of musical exercises regularly performed for 49 days after the death of the body, and leads it to clear consciousness. The ritual is a 22-fold expansion of the Lucifer formula, reflecting the two sets of repeated-note unceduplets that begin that formula. The flautist, costumed as a cat, is the shamanistic celebrant, and is accompanied by six percussionists representing the six mortal senses of sight, hearing, smell, taste, touch, and thought. The percussionists play on a set of tuned sound plates (initially eleven of them, arranged in the order of the notes of the Lucifer formula), as well as on a total of at least 30 specially created "magic instruments" which are attached to or form parts of their costumes. The flautist begins with a "salute" and then, following the segments of two mandalas, performs a series of 22 exercises, with two interspersed pauses at positions 7 and 13 out of 24 marked on the two mandalas. The number 7 is emblematic for Licht as the number of the days of the week, but is also the number of letters in the name "Lucifer", while 13 is not only a number traditionally associated with misfortune, but is also the number up to which Lucifer repeatedly counts throughout the opera cycle. As the percussionists continue playing through this second pause, the flautist performs an "exchange of the senses", reordering the sound plates and adding a twelfth note, in order to transform Lucifer's formula into that of Eve. She then resumes the exercises and continues without further interruption straight through to the end. The exercises are followed by a "Release of the Senses", a gradual exit, a series of eleven "trombone tones" on the flute, and a final scream.

=== Scene 3: Luzifers Tanz ===
In Lucifer's Dance, Lucifer causes an orchestra to appear in the form of a gigantic face, gradually bringing its ten parts into contrary dances, with the motto: "If you, Man, have never learned from Lucifer / how the spirit of contradiction and independence / distorts the expression of the face, . . . you cannot—in harmony—turn your countenance toward the Light." Michael then appears and protests with a piccolo-trumpet solo against Lucifer's pleasure in the grimacing face, but is beaten back with tamtam beats, and the face responds with a dance of streaming tears. A black cat playing a piccolo appears on the tip of the face's extended tongue, and hails Satan's children. The dance resumes, but is broken off by an orchestra strike and ends in chaos.

=== Scene 4: Luzifers Abschied ===
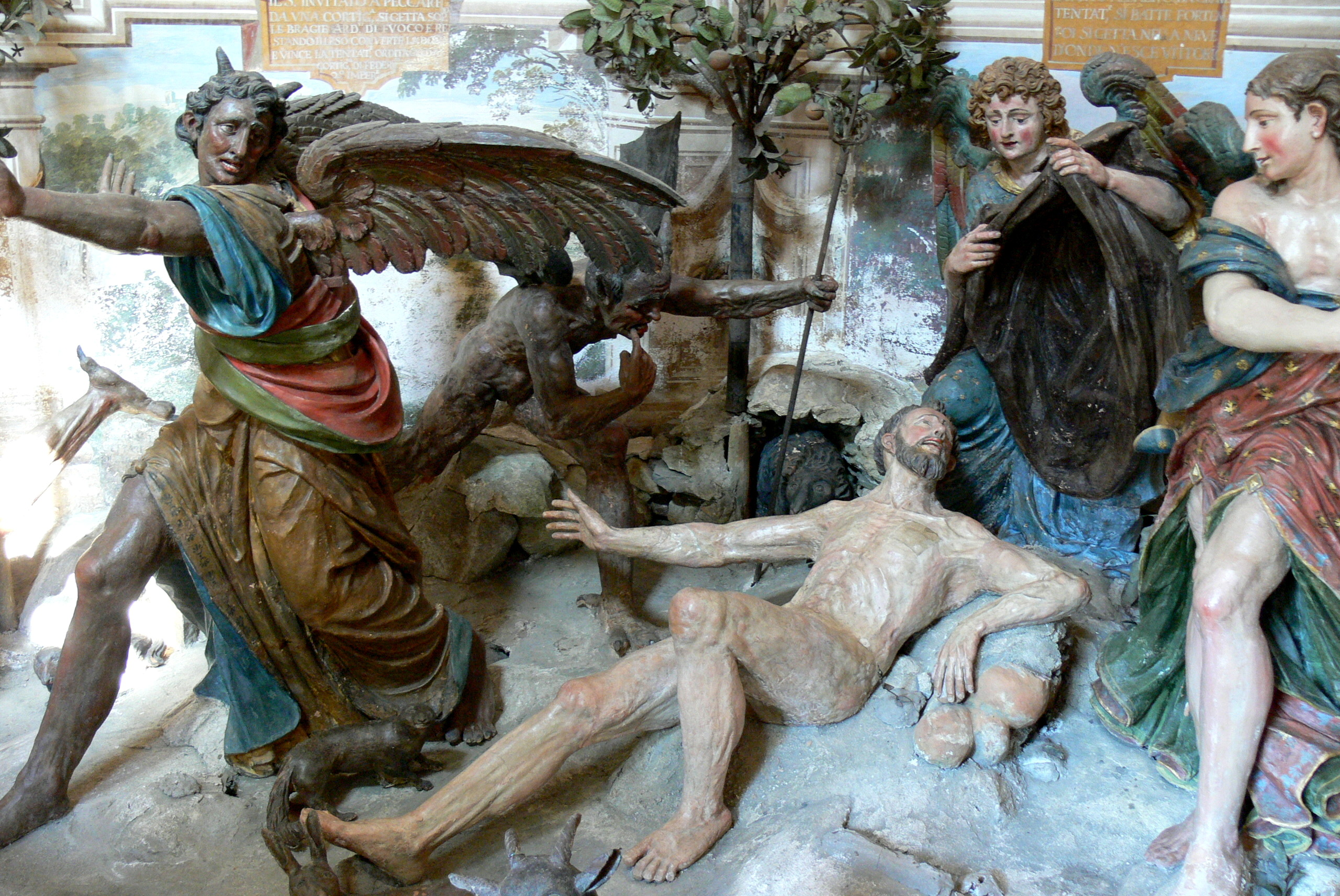
Victory of St. Francis over Lucifer's temptations (Sacro Monte, Orta, Chapel 10)

Lucifer's Farewell concludes the opera with a ceremony of exorcism, performed by 3 x 13 monks, singing the "Salutatio Virtutum" by St. Francis of Assisi, in Italian translation as "Lodi delle virtù" (The Praises of the Virtues). The 39 choir members wear wooden shoes, and also require mass bells, Good-Friday clappers, a large tamtam, a bag of coins, a caged wild bird, and a large sack of 39 coconuts.

At the beginning, 13 tenors dressed in white monks' habits enter in procession, softly singing the words "Lodi delle virtù" over and over, followed by 13 basses in black habits and another 13 basses in brown habits. Line by line, individual monks step forward to sing the text by St. Francis, in Italian. When they reach the words "la santa sapienza confonde satana", they are stopped by a roll on the tamtam and, when a bass voice continues, "e tutte le sue insidie", seven staccato organ chords answer, followed by a series of thirteen chords from seven trombones. The monks resume singing and, at the seventh trombone chord, a sack full of something and tied shut falls out of the sky. After the last words of the text bells begin to peal, the monks free a caged black bird, and then open the sack, which proves to be filled with coconuts. One after another, the monks each take a coconut and smash it on a centrally placed stone, as they repeat fragments of the text.

== Discography ==
- Stockhausen, Karlheinz. Samstag aus Licht. Matthias Hölle (bass); Majella Stockhausen (piano); Kathinka Pasveer (flute and piccolo); Markus Stockhausen (piccolo trumpet); Kolberg Percussion Ensemble; The University of Michigan Symphony Band, H. Robert Reynolds (cond.); Piero Mazarella (actor); Händel Collegium Köln, Dieter Gutknecht (choir director); Günther Hempel (electric organ); Karlheinz Stockhausen (sound projection). DGG 423 596-2. Hamburg: Deutsche Grammophon, 1988. Reissued Stockhausen Complete Edition, CD 34 A–D (4CDs). Kürten: Stockhausen-Verlag, 1992.
- Schöpfung und Erschöpfung. Musik in Deutschland 1950–2000. Mauricio Kagel; Karlheinz Stockhausen. CD. 74321 73635 2. [Munich]: BMG Ariola Classics, 2003. Includes Samstags-Gruß with the University of Michigan Symphony Band.
- Stockhausen, Karlheinz. Zungenspitzentanz, from Samstag aus Licht, for piccolo, euphonium, synthesizer player, and percussionist. Kathinka Pasveer (piccolo); Antonio Pérez Abellán (synthesizer) etc. (With: Stockhausen, Klavierstück XVI, Freia, Komet als Klavierstück XVII, Entführung, Flöte, and Thinki). Stockhausen Complete Edition CD 57 (single CD). Kürten: Stockhausen-Verlag, 2000.
- Stockhausen, Karlheinz. Rechter Augenbrautanz, for clarinets, bass clarinets, percussionist, and synthesizer. Antonio Pérez Abellán (synthesizer). (With: Stockhausen, Capricorn, for bass and electronic music.) Compact Disc 59 (single CD). Kürten: Stockhausen-Verlag, 200?.
- Stockhausen, Karlheinz. Suzanne Stephens: Traum-Formel, In Freundschaft, Amour. Suzanne Stephens (clarinet and basset horn) DG 423 378-2 (single CD). Hamburg: Deutsche Grammophon, 1988. Reissued on Stockhausen Complete Edition CD 27. Kürten: Stockhausen-Verlag, 200?.
- Stockhausen, Karlheinz. Musik für Flöte: Kathinka Pasveer spielt 9 Kompositionen. (Kathinkas Gesang als Luzifers Requiem, version for flute and electronic music; In Freundschaft, for flute; Piccolo, solo for piccolo; Amour, for flute; Susanis Echo, for alto flute; Xi, for flute; Zungenspitzentanz, for piccolo; Flautina, for flute with piccolo and alto flute; Ypsilon, for flute.) Stockhausen Complete Edition CD 28 A–B (2CDs). Kürten: Stockhausen-Verlag, 1992.
- Karlheinz Stockhausen for Basset Horn. Michele Marelli, basset horn. (Traum-Formel and five other compositions.) Times Future. CD recording, stereo. Stradivarius STR 33958. [Cologno Monzese (Milan)]: Stradivarius, 2013.
- Stockhausen, Karlheinz. Linker Augentanz; In Freundschaft for oboe; Taurus; Taurus-Quintett; Kamel-Tanz; Rotary-Bläserquintett. In the Linker Augentanz: Ensemble Konsax, Wien; Lars Mlekusch, dir. Recorded 5 February 2015, at the Konservatorium Wien Privatuniversität. CD recording, 1 disc: digital, 12 cm, stereo. Stockhausen Complete Edition CD 105. Kürten: Stockhausen-Verlag, 2015.
