= Lydia Steier =

American stage director based in Germany

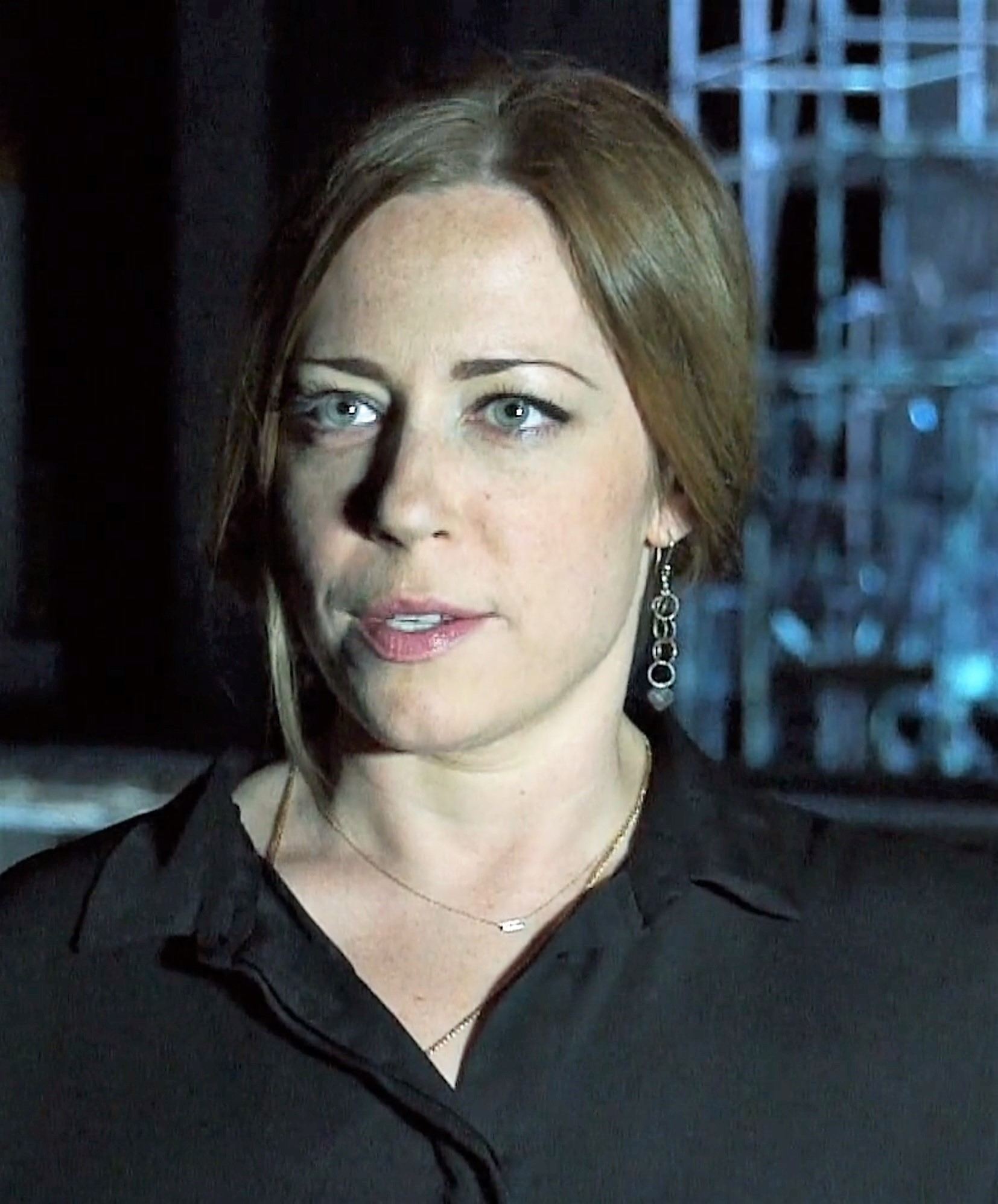
- Steier speaks about her production of Turandot in 2017
- Born: 1978 (age 47–48); Hartford, Connecticut, U.S.
- Education: Oberlin Conservatory of Music
- Occupation: Opera director

Lydia Steier (born 1978) is an American opera director who has made an international career based in Germany. She directed the Swiss premiere of Stockhausen's Donnerstag aus Licht, chosen by critics as "Best Production of the Year" in 2016. In 2018, she became the first woman to stage Mozart's Die Zauberflöte at the Salzburg Festival, for the opening performance in 2018.

== Career ==
Steier was born in Hartford, Connecticut. Her grandparents had left Vienna for the United States when the Nazis entered Vienna. She studied stage directing and voice at the Oberlin Conservatory of Music in Ohio. In 2002, she moved to Germany as a Fulbright student, and worked as an assistant at the Komische Oper Berlin.

Steier staged a double bill of Leoncavallo's Pagliaccio and Busoni's Turandot at the Deutsches Nationaltheater Weimar, which was awarded the prize "Neuentdeckung des Jahres 2009" (discovery of the year) by Deutschlandradio Kultur. Her stagings of Handel's Saul at the Staatstheater Oldenburg and Pascal Dusapin's Perelà, uomo di fumo were nominated for the Faust award. When she directed Handel's Giulio Cesare at the Komische Oper Berlin in 2015, she said about her approach to staging operas: "I have to make my idea plausible to musicians and singers. I was a singer. I'm not playing against the singers, but with them. I always make sure they can breathe properly. I think vocally." In 2016, Steier directed the Swiss premiere of Karlheinz Stockhausen's Donnerstag aus Licht at the Theater Basel, conducted by Titus Engel. The production, the first after 30 years, earned the award "Best Production of the Year" ("Aufführung des Jahres") by Opernwelt. In 2017, Steier staged Puccini's Turandot at the Cologne Opera, conducted by Claude Schnitzler. Jean-Luc Clairet called her staging of Stravinsky's The Rake's Progress in Basel in 2018, "a jewel", and described her as playing with light in this musical comedy inspired by paintings by William Hogarth.

For the 2018 Salzburg Festival, she created the opening production of Mozart's Die Zauberflöte, conducted by Constantinos Carydis. She is the first woman to direct the work at the festival. She staged it as a play in a play, with Klaus Maria Brandauer as a narrator as the grandfather of the Three Boys. In Le Monde, Marie-Aude Roux commented: "It takes a real temper to dare to tackle this emblematic opera, which flourishes in traditional staging. But the American ... is obviously unafraid and takes up the challenge with a real scenic idea, whose abundant realization would nevertheless benefit from being reworked ..." In the 2018/19 season, she staged a double bill of Stravinsky's Oedipus rex and Tchaikovsky's last opera Iolanta, conducted by Sebastian Weigle.

In July 2025 Lydia Steier has been elected as the next artistic director of the Ruhrtriennale festival (2027-2029) as successor of Ivo van Hove.
