= Titus Engel =

Swiss conductor (born 1975)

Titus Engel (born 1975) is a Swiss conductor with a focus on both contemporary opera and Baroque opera in historically informed performance.

== Education ==
Born in Zürich, Engel first studied musicology and philosophy at the University of Zurich and at the Humboldt University of Berlin, graduating with a master's degree. He then began studying conducting with Christian Kluttig at the Hochschule für Musik Carl Maria von Weber Dresden. He subsequently attended master classes with Sir Colin Davis, Peter Eötvös and Ilja Mussin. Grants from the Dirigentenforum of the Deutscher Musikrat (2002–2005) and the foundation of David Zinman's American Academy of Conducting at Aspen complemented his training. Furthermore, he worked as assistant to Sylvain Cambreling, Marc Albrecht and Peter Rundel.

== Career ==
Engel made his opera debut in 2000 with the world premiere of Benjamin Schweitzer's Jakob von Gunten at the Dresdner Tage der zeitgenössischen Musik. Since then, he has directed many performances in different genres at various stages, for example Monteverdi's L'Orfeo at the Radialsystem Berlin and at the Theater an der Wien, several operas at the Kampnagel Hamburg and in the Staatstheater Stuttgart up to Glass' Akhnaten at the Vlaamse Opera. At the invitation of Gerard Mortier, he made his debut at the Teatro Real Madrid with the world premiere of Pilar Jurado's La página en blancoim in February 2011, where he is now a regular guest: in 2014, he conducted the world premiere of Charles Wuorinen's opera Brokeback Mountain. In June 2016, he conducted the Swiss premiere and third complete performance ever of Stockhausen's Donnerstag from the cycle Licht at the Theater Basel. The production received the award "Performance of the Year" in the critics' poll of the Opernwelt 2016.

Engel has conducted numerous renowned orchestras such as the orchestra of the Paris Opéra, the Orchestra of the Deutsche Oper Berlin, the Mozarteum Orchestra Salzburg, several Radio orchestras, the Orquesta Sinfónica de Castilla y León, the Bern Symphony Orchestra, the Mahler Chamber Orchestra, the Danish National Chamber Orchestra as well as several chamber orchestras in southern Germany and Switzerland. He is also regularly invited to perform with leading ensembles for contemporary music. From 2000 to 2012, he was musical director of the ensemble courage. He has premiered numerous works (Sergej Newski, Leo Dick, Elena Mendoza, Olga Neuwirth, Michael Wertmüller, Rebecca Saunders) among others by the RuhrTriennale, the Berliner Festspiele, the Lucerne Festival, the MaerzMusik, the Donaueschinger Musiktage, the Salzburg Festival and the Opera d'hoy Madrid.

Projects in 2017 included the world premieres of Elena Mendoza's opera La ciudad de las mentirasaus at the Teatro Real Madrid and Mozart's La Betulia Liberata at the Oper Frankfurt. The world premiere of Infinite Now by Chaya Czernowin at the Vlaanderen Opera and the Nationaltheater Mannheim was chosen as "Premiere of the Year" by Opernwelt in 2017.

Die Deutsche Bühne described him as a "conducting dervish" who safely guided all actors through breakneck rapids.

== Recordings ==
Engel has recorded numerous works for radio, television and CDs, including WERGO Benjamin Schweitzer's chamber music with ensemble courage and the Project 21 prelude, with works by H. Pohjanorro, P. Haapanen, R. Gubler and C. Neidhöfer, ensemble courage at en-avant records. In collaboration with ZDF-ARTE, he realised several first recordings of historical and contemporary silent film music. The recording of the premiere of the opera Brokeback Mountain was released as a DVD in autumn 2015.

== Awards ==
- 2003: Fellow der American Academy of Conducting Aspen under the direction of David Zinman
- 2002–2005: Sponsorship by the German Music Council (Dirigentenforum).
- 2016: "Performance of the Year" with Donnerstag from Licht at the Opernwelt critics' poll
- 2020: "Conductor of the Year" in the Opernwelt critics' poll (together with Kirill Petrenko).

== Trivia ==
Together with Viktor Schoner, Engel initiated the Academy Musiktheater Heute and the Ligerzer Opernwerkstatt He is the editor of several books on contemporary opera.

== Publications ==
- Engel, Titus; Fragner, Stefan; Schoner, Viktor (2001). Generation-Oper (in German). Saarbrücken: Pfau. ISBN 978-3-89727-127-2.
- Engel, Titus; Schoner, Viktor (2006). Libretto (in German). Saarbrücken: Pfau. ISBN 978-3-89727-343-6.
- Engel, Titus (2010). Zeitgenössische Komische Oper (in German). Saarbrücken: Pfau. ISBN 978-3-89727-411-2.
