= Nicola Jürgensen =

German clarinetist

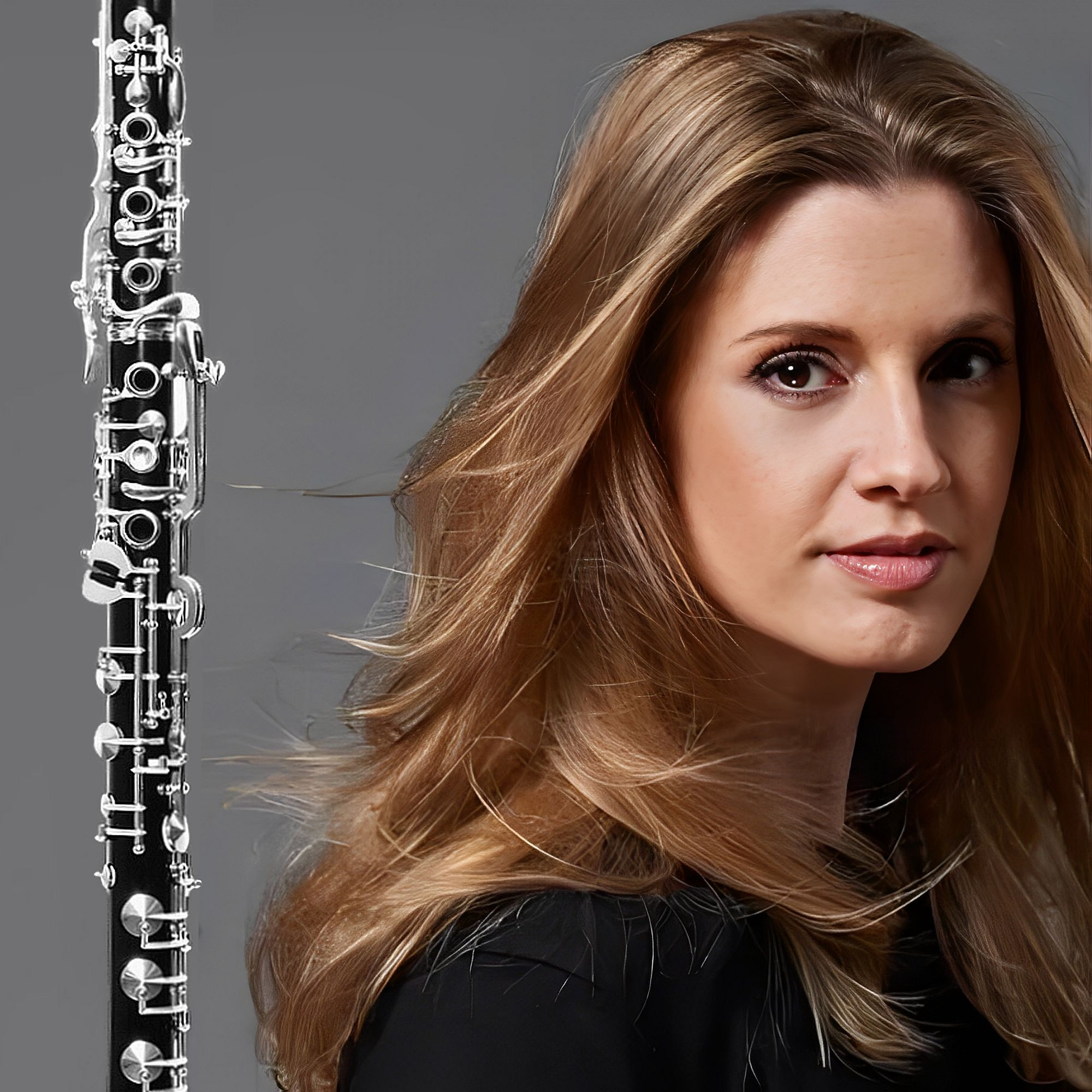
- Born: 1975 (age 50–51); Bangkok, Thailand
- Education: Musikhochschule Hannover; Lübeck Academy of Music
- Occupations: Classical clarinetist; Academic teacher
- Organizations: WDR Symphony Orchestra Cologne; Folkwang University of the Arts; Trio Mirabeau
- Spouse: Volker Jacobsen

Nicola Jürgensen (born 1975) is a German clarinetist and academic teacher. She played principal clarinet with the WDR Symphony Orchestra Cologne from 2001 to 2018, and has been professor of clarinet at Folkwang University of the Arts in Essen from 2018. She is active internationally as a soloist and chamber music player, and has made recordings. Besides the traditional repertoire, she is focused on contemporary music. She performed on stage in a production of Karlheinz Stockhausen's Michaels Reise um die Erde in Vienna and New York City, among others.

== Life ==
Jürgensen was born in Bangkok and grew up in Hamburg. She studied at the Hochschule für Musik, Theater und Medien Hannover with Hans Deinzer and from 1996 at the Lübeck Academy of Music with Sabine Meyer. She was solo clarinetist with the WDR Symphony Orchestra Cologne from 2001 to 2018. In 2018, she was appointed professor of clarinet at Folkwang University of the Arts in Essen.

Together with the pianist Matthias Kirschnereit and the violist and husband Volker Jacobsen she founded the Trio Mirabeau. They made their debut in 2004 at the Dresden Music Festival.

Jürgensen has played as a soloist with orchestras including the Deutsche Kammerphilharmonie Bremen, the Beethoven Orchester Bonn, the Hamburger Symphoniker, the Philharmonisches Orchester Freiburg and the Ensemble Resonanz. In 2008, she played a major role in a staged production of Michaels Reise um die Erde (Michael's Journey Around the Earth), the second act of Karlheinz Stockhausen's Donnerstag aus Licht, directed by Carlus Padrissa of La Fura dels Baus. Jürgensen played Eve (basset horn), Marco Blaauw played Michael (trumpet), and Peter Rundel conducted the ensemble musikFabrik; the production was first presented by the Vienna Wiener Taschenoper as part of the Wiener Festwochen. It was recorded on video. The production was revived in 2013 at Avery Fisher Hall in New York City.

In 2013, Jürgensen played Carl Nielsen's Violin Concerto with the Auckland Philharmonia Orchestra, conducted by Eckehard Stier. In 2019, she served in the jury of Deutscher Musikwettbewerb.

== Recordings ==
Jürgensen recorded works by Berg, Brahms Debussy, Reger and Stravinsky for the Ars Musici label. She took part in a recording of Songs and Cycles by Ned Rorem with soprano Laura Aikin and pianist Donald Sulzen, playing the clarinet part in the cycle Ariel composed in 1971 setting poems by Sylvia Plath. A reviewer of Gramophone noted: "Nicola Jürgensen provides a spectacular clarinet obbligato to the slightly jazzy settings". She recorded Dans la Nuit with pianist in Michael Kirschnereit in 2012, a collection of French melodies adapted for clarinet, by composers including Fauré, Poulenc, Saint-Saëns and Massenet.

- 2000: Claude Debussy – Première rhapsodie pour clarinette et piano
- 2001: Nicola Jürgensen – Klarinette, Ars Musici – Primavera (Freiburger Musik Forum)
- 2004: Songs and Cycles by Ned Rorem, Laura Aikin (soprano), Donald Sulzen (piano), Gerhard Zank (cello), ORFEO International
- 2012: Dans la Nuit, ORFEO International
- 2012: Karlheinz Stockhausen – Michaels Reise um die Erde, WERGO (Note 1 Musikvertrieb)

== Awards ==
- 1998: Mozart-Preis of the Wiesbaden Mozartgesellschaft
- 1999: Prize of Deutscher Musikwettbewerb for soloists in Berlin
- 2002: Bremer Musikfest-Preis, Förderpreis by Deutschlandfunk.
