= Matthias Hölle =

German opera singer

- Born: 8 July 1951 (age 75); Rottweil, West Germany
- Education: Musikhochschule Stuttgart; Musikhochschule Köln
- Occupation: bass
- Organizations: Cologne Opera; Staatstheater Stuttgart; Bayreuth Festival
- Title: Kammersänger

Matthias Hölle (born 8 July 1951) is a German bass in opera and concert who has made an international career. He performed regularly at the Bayreuth Festival in major roles such as Hunding in Die Walküre, King Marke in Tristan und Isolde, and Gurnemanz and Titurel in Parsifal. He appeared in the world premieres of Stockhausen's Donnerstag aus Licht and Samstag aus Licht at La Scala in Milan.

== Life ==
Born in Rottweil, Hölle studied voice at the Musikhochschule Stuttgart with Georg Jelden and at the Musikhochschule Köln with Josef Metternich. He then became known as an oratorio singer. From 1976 to 1987, he belonged to the ensemble of the Cologne Opera. After that he moved to the Staatstheater Stuttgart, where he was awarded the title of Kammersänger.

From 1981 to 2001, Hölle performed every summer at the Bayreuth Festival, as Hunding in Die Walküre, Fasolt in Das Rheingold, as both Titurel and Gurnemanz in Parsifal, Veit Pogner in Die Meistersinger von Nürnberg, King Marke in Tristan und Isolde and as Daland in Der fliegende Holländer.

Hölle has performed as a guest at major international operas such as La Scala in Milan and the Metropolitan Opera, and at international festivals such as the Salzburg Festival. In 1978, he received recognition as the Komtur in Mozart's Don Giovanni. At La Scala, he appeared as Lucifer in the world premieres of Stockhausen's Donnerstag aus Licht on 15 March 1981 and Samstag aus Licht on 25 May 1984. He appeared in New York City as Rocco in Beethoven's Fidelio. When the Oper Frankfurt was reopened after a fire, he performed as Sarastro in Mozart's Die Zauberflöte.

His recordings include the Stockhausen works, the Bayreuth broadcasts, and complete recordings of Die Zauberflöte, Don Giovanni, and Fidelio.
