= Mitridate (Porpora) =

1730 opera by Nicola Antonio Porpora

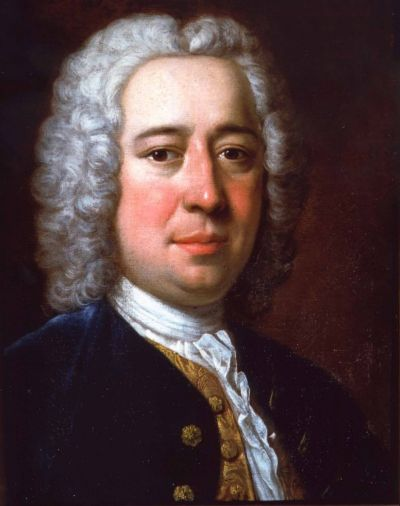
Nicola Antonio Porpora

Mitridate is an opera by Nicola Antonio Porpora to a libretto by Filippo Vanstriper premiered in Rome in 1730. Porpora and revived and revised the work for London (1736) with actor-manager and librettist Colley Cibber in direct competition with Handel's opera house. The London version of the opera was performed for the 250th anniversary of Porpora's death at the Festival "Winter in Schwetzingen" Directed by Jacopo Spirei, conducted by Felice Venanzoni (November 2017 to February 2018).

The opera was written for the castrati Farinelli, Senesino and the famous soprano Francesca Cuzzoni, the original Cleopatra.
