= Brokeback Mountain (opera) =

2014 opera by Charles Wuorinen

- Opera by Charles Wuorinen
- Librettist: Annie Proulx
- Language: English
- Based on: "Brokeback Mountain" by Annie Proulx
- Premiere: 28 January 2014; Teatro Real, Madrid
- Website: Official website

Brokeback Mountain is an opera by American composer Charles Wuorinen, with a libretto in English by Annie Proulx, based on her 1997 short story "Brokeback Mountain". They began work on it in 2008 under a commission by Gerard Mortier of the New York City Opera. He took the project with him to the Teatro Real of Madrid, where the opera was premiered on January 28, 2014.

== Composition history ==
In 2007, Wuorinen, a Pulitzer Prize-winning American composer, saw the 2005 film directed by Ang Lee and "was inspired by its operatic possibilities." He approached Proulx with the idea of turning her short story into an opera and "to ask for her blessing to adapt the story for opera. Proulx went one step further, offering to write the libretto".

As recounted by Ashifa Kassam:

After reading Proulx' tale of doomed lovers, composer Charles Wuorinen knew he had the makings of a tragic opera. "In older operas there would be an illegitimate child or difference of social classes," said Wuorinen. "Same-sex love, especially when it takes place in an environment where it's absolutely forbidden, is a contemporary version of the same eternal problem."

Gerard Mortier, the incoming General Director of the New York City Opera, arranged to commission the work. When Mortier abruptly left the New York City Opera in 2008, the project was in limbo for a time, but he took it with him to his new post as General Director of Teatro Real in Madrid.

Work on the opera was started in August 2008 and completed in February 2012. As Philip Kennicott notes:

While other composers might have found the taciturn and often painfully inarticulate characters a challenge, Wuorinen was inspired. Brokeback Mountain was a struggle toward the possibility of expression, about a groping toward language and awareness and self-knowledge. "I take the position that since it takes a long time for any word to get out, that what is laconic on the page can seem quite expansive on the opera stage," he says.

== Performance history ==
The world premiere took place 28 January 2014 in Madrid directed by Ivo van Hove and conducted by Titus Engel. The opera received its German premiere in Aachen on 7 December 2014 in a production directed by Ludger Engels and conducted by Kazem Abdullah. A chamber version for 24 players was commissioned by the Salzburger Landestheater and premiered on 27 February 2016, directed by Jacopo Spirei, and conducted by Adrian Kelly.

== Roles ==
Role	Voice type	Premiere cast, 28 January 2014 Conductor: Titus Engel
Ennis del Mar	bass-baritone	Daniel Okulitch
Jack Twist	tenor	Tom Randle
Aguirre, trail boss	bass	Ethan Herschenfeld
Alma Beers, Ennis' wife	soprano	Heather Buck
Mrs. Beers, Alma's mother	mezzo-soprano	Celia Alcedo
Lureen, Jack's wife	mezzo-soprano	Hannah Esther Minutillo
Hogboy, Lureen's father	bass	Ethan Herschenfeld
John Twist Sr., Jack's father	tenor	Ryan MacPherson
Mrs. Twist, Jack's mother	alto	Jane Henschel
Bartender	alto	Hilary Summers
Saleswoman	alto	Letitia Singleton
Bill Jones	spoken	Basque Fracanzani
Chorus: Townspeople (including Cowboy—Gaizka Gurruchaga)

== Synopsis ==
The two-hour opera is performed without intermission.

=== Act 1 ===
- Scene 1: 1963, Aguirre's trailer
- Scene 2: Bar, Old Longhorn
- Scene 3: On the mountain
- Scene 4: Main camp, four days later
- Scene 5: Main camp, next day sunset
- Scene 6: Main camp, next morning
- Scene 7: Dress shop
- Scene 8: Lower main camp, twilight
- Scene 9: Next morning, first light
- Scene 10: Farm machinery salesroom, Texas
- Scene 11: 1967, interior Alma and Ennis’ apartment in Riverton

=== Act 2 ===
- Scene 1: 1967, Del Mar apartment
- Scene 2: Motel Siesta
- Scene 3: Six years later, Del Mar apartment
- Scene 4: Farm machinery salesroom, Texas
- Scene 5: Del Mar apartment
- Scene 6: Thanksgiving, Alma and Bill's dining room and kitchen
- Scene 7: 1983, (10 years later) in the mountains, late afternoon
- Scene 8: Early autumn, downtown Riverton, in front of post office
- Scene 9: Twist kitchen
- Scene 10: Jack's bedroom
- Scene 11: Ennis' trailer

== Music ==
Wuorinen has been described as an "unabashedly complex Modernist." The composer expressed his views on the kind of musical idiom suited to this subject matter – and to his own tastes in music:

"Opera should deploy the full resources of musical composition and not be restricted to any kind of model, including a model of what is lyric singing," says Wuorinen. The composer's personal litany of great opera is revealing – the works of Monteverdi, "some of Wagner," Schoenberg's Moses und Aron, Debussy's Pelléas et Mélisande, Stravinsky's The Rake's Progress, and of course the operas of Alban Berg. "You can tell where my sympathies lie."

Wuorinen used Schoenberg's half-sung, half-spoken Sprechstimme as a way for the character of Ennis to express himself in the early part of the opera. He does not develop sung lines until the second act, as before that he cannot acknowledge who he really is. Schoenberg had used this technique for his character of Moses, who was unable to put "complex thought into comprehensible words." He associates the two leads with different musical pitches, "B-natural and C-sharp, a whole step apart, yet divided by a third tonal area associated with the mountain itself, based on a low C."

Commenting on the formal qualities of Wuorinen's work, Gerard Mortier said:

Wuorinen understood that he could support Proulx's idea through his music, but also that he needed a great formal conception to avoid sentimentalism, just as Wagner did ... Next to the film of Brokeback Mountain, which was rather sentimental and closer to Puccini, Wuorinen will serve the essential dimension of Annie Proulx's fabulous novel.

== Instrumentation ==
The orchestral score calls for:

- piccolo (doubles 3rd flute), 2 flutes, 2 oboes, 3 clarinets (2 in B-flat, 1 bass clarinet), 2 bassoons, 1 contrabassoon;
- 4 horns, 2 trumpets in C, 2 trombones, 1 bass trombone, tuba;
- timpani, 2 or 3 percussion: xylophone, 5-octave marimba, vibraphone, deep bass drum, 4 drums, guiro, harp, piano
- strings (violins I, violins II, violas, violoncellos, double basses).

== Reception ==
Philip Kennicott of Opera News said that Wuorinen and Proulx had made a work in which "Brokeback Mountain remains as rugged and wild as the landscape that plays an intimate role in shaping the characters' lives." In his Gramophone review of the premiere production video, Kennicott states: "It may be difficult to decide how much Wuorinen’s music adds to Proulx’s words. It was a masterstroke to ask the original author to write the libretto, which is a free-standing work of literature, both amplifying the original story and adding specifically operatic elements, including a ghost scene and a brutally effective chorus. But in the end, the opera feels like a genuine collaboration, allowing Okulitch especially to carry his doomed character [Ennis del Mar] into a different expressive realm than the [short story] or the movie. His Ennis emerges as an Orpheus for a new age of love and loss."

Anthony Tommasini of The New York Times described it as "a serious work, an impressive achievement. But it is a hard opera to love." He said Wuorinen had written "an intricate, vibrantly orchestrated and often brilliant score that conveys the oppressiveness of the forces that defeat these two men" but suggested that the complexity of his music at times weighed down the drama. He described the production by director Ivo van Hove as "starkly beautiful" and credited Mortier with being the champion for this ambitious work. Tommasini noted that Proulx had given Ennis a "kind of plain-spoken elegance" in the libretto and opened her original story. Ennis becomes reflective after he and Jack have their first sexual encounter: "We look down on them hawks./We look down on them pine trees./We're like eagles, Jack." Tommasini says this is "matched by a fleeting burst of lyricism in Mr. Wuorinen's vocal writing."

Andrew Clements of The Guardian said that the music was rather dry and "etiolated" and seldom "transcends the text enough to enhance the drama rather than just adding rather terse punctuation and commentary to it." He said the performances of the singers and orchestra were excellent, but thought it should have been staged with a more spare setting. Clements also thought that Proulx had added too many elements to the libretto, clouding the plot.

It received mixed reviews, as the Spanish press was "broadly positive."

== Recording ==
The HD video recording of the world premiere production at the Teatro Real of Madrid was made in February 2014. It was a coproduction of Teatro Real de Madrid and Bel Air Media. The producer was François Duplat and the video director was Jérémie Cuvillier. It was released on DVD and Blu-Ray by Bel Air Classiques in 2015. It is also available for streaming on Medici.tv.
