= Jacopo Spirei =

Italian opera stage director (born 1974)

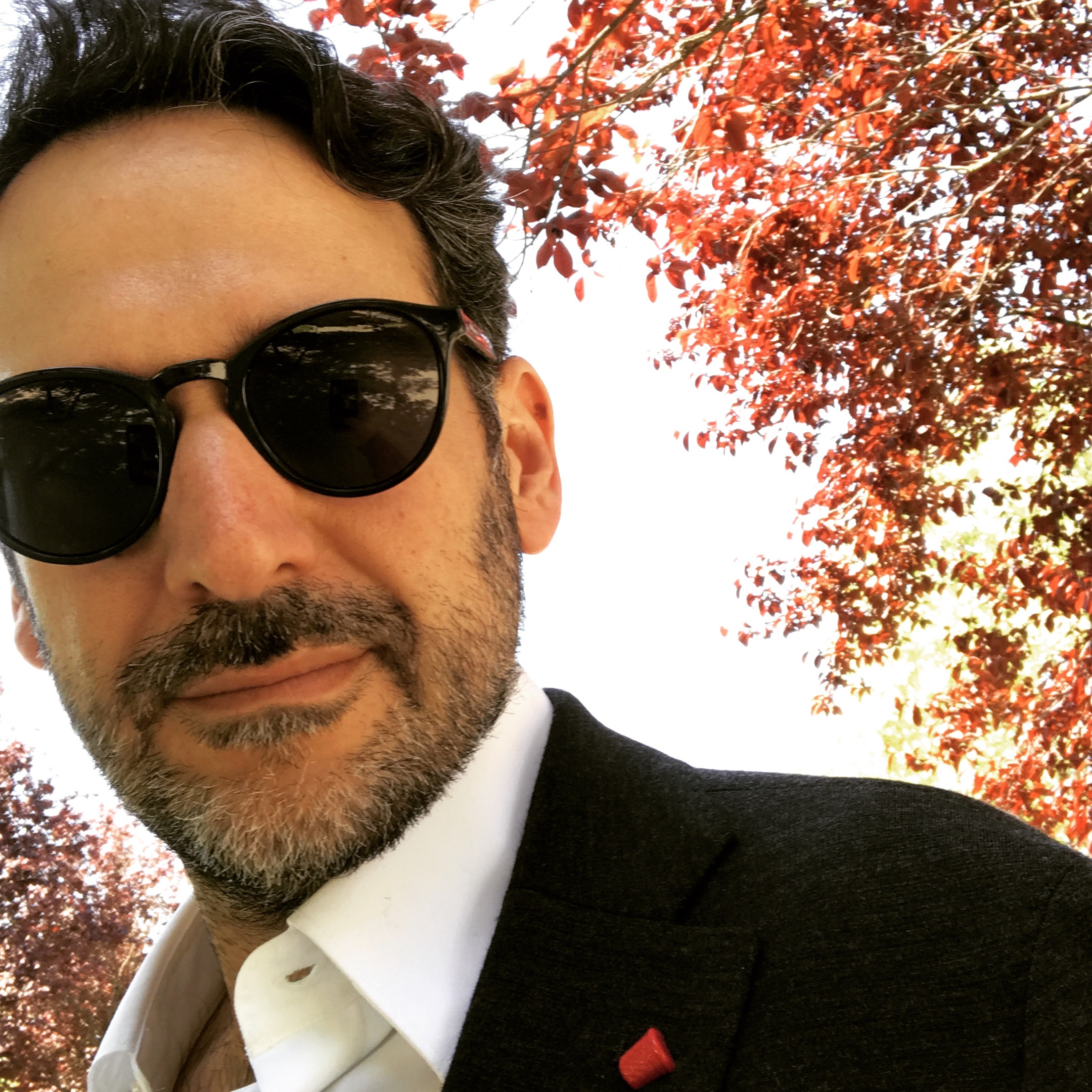
- Jacopo Spirei
- Born: 1974 (age 50–51); Florence
- Occupation: Opera stage director
- Website: www.jacopospirei.com

Jacopo Spirei (born 1974) is an Italian opera stage director. He is the winner of the audience prize in Salzburg for best production of the season 2012/2013 at the Salzburger Landestheater.

== Biography ==
Born in Rome raised in Florence, after classical studies Spirei studied arts and drama in Bologna and filmmaking in New York City at the New York Film Academy.

He started working in opera as a voluntary assistant director in Italy with Stefano Vizioli and Talmage Fauntleroy.

He then moved to London to work with John Copley and Robert Chevara at the Royal College of Music, before becoming assistant to the internationally renowned and innovative opera director Graham Vick with whom he has worked for over 12 years.

Within this period, he helped staging several operas at the Glyndebourne Festival Opera, at the Maggio Musicale Fiorentino, at the Birmingham Opera Company (included the first-ever staging of the Mittwoch aus Licht by Stockhausen), at the Houston Grand Opera, at the Bregenzer Festspiele, at the New National Theater in Tokyo, at the Teatro Nacional de São Carlos in Lisbon for the entire cycle of the Der Ring des Nibelungen by Richard Wagner.

His official debut as opera stage director took place in 1994 in Cortona where he directed La finta giardiniera by Mozart.

Spirei started his independent activity in 2000 with the revival direction of Vick's production Le nozze di Figaro at the Royal Albert Hall in London and in Glyndebourne, and then Vick's landmark Eugene Onegin in 2008.

He then worked both as an associate and revival director at Glyndebourne until 2014.

Since then, he has been working both in Italy and all over the world.

Between 2006 and 2011 he was artistic director and founder of Spurio, an experimental project involving opera, filmmaking, video art and live performance, that culminated in the production of a feature film based on the myth of Orpheus with live music composed by Davide Fensi.

He currently has a long-time collaboration with the Opera Academy of the Royal Opera House in Copenhagen for which he has directed scenes and short works like: L'heure espagnole, Turn of the screw, Jules Massenet’s Manon, Dialogues des Carmelites, La bohème, Wozzeck.

He has also worked with the young singers of the Accademia della Scala and the Royal Conservatoire of Scotland.

Spirei is professor for opera1 at the Oslo National Academy of the Arts KhiO, Norway.

== Recognitions ==
In 2012/2013 he's won the Audience prize in Salzburg for best production of the season.

== Opera productions ==
- 2005 Wolfgang Amadeus Mozart: Bastiano e Bastiana – Giovanni Battista Pergolesi: La serva padrona, Lugo Opera Festival.
- 2012 Gioachino Rossini: La cambiale di matrimonio, Theater an der Wien.
- 2013 Giacomo Puccini: Madama Butterfly, Co-opera Co, London.
- 2015 Giuseppe Verdi: Falstaff, Badisches Staatsteather Karlsruhe.
- 2015 Ruggero Leoncavallo: Pagliacci, Wexford Festival Opera.
- 2015 Domenico Cimarosa: Il matrimonio segreto, Royal Danish Opera Takkelloftet
- 2015 Gioachino Rossini: La cenerentola, Festival Internacional de Música, Cartagena.
- 2015 Wolfgang Amadeus Mozart: Le nozze di Figaro, Co-opera Co, London.
- 2016 Wolfgang Amadeus Mozart: Don Giovanni, Salzburger Landestheater.
- 2016 Charles Wuorinen: Brokeback Mountain, Salsburger Landestheater and (2018) New York City Opera. Nominated for best production at the Österreichischer Musiktheaterpreis 2017.
- 2016 Gaetano Donizetti: L'elisir d'amore, Badisches Staatstheater, Karlsruhe.
- 2016 Alessandro Scarlatti: Gli equivoci nel sembiante, Opera Festival Purtimiro, Lugo.
- 2016 Bruno Maderna: Satyricon – William Walton: The bear, Royal Danish Opera Takkelloftet.
- 2017 Nicola Antonio Porpora: Mitridate, Schloss Schwetzingen.
- 2017 Giuseppe Verdi: Falstaff, Festival Verdi, Parma.
- 2017 Giuseppe Verdi: Nabucco, Festival Como Città della Musica.
- 2017 Wolfgang Amadeus Mozart: Don Giovanni, San Francisco Opera.
- 2017 Wolfgang Amadeus Mozart: Don Giovanni, Den Norske Opera – Kunsthøgskolen I Oslo.
- 2017 Kurt Weill: Aufstieg und Fall der Stadt Mahagonny, Salzburger Landestheater. Nominated for best direction at the Österreichischer Musiktheaterpreis 2018.
- 2017 Gioachino Rossini: La cambiale di matrimonio, Theater an der Wien – Kammeroper.
- 2017 Christoph Willibald Gluck: Pilger von Mekka, Salzburger Landestheater.
- 2018 Claudio Monteverdi: L'incoronazione di Poppea, Kunsthøgskolen I Oslo.
- 2018 Wolfgang Amadeus Mozart: Le nozze di Figaro, Salzburger Landestheater.
- 2018 Wolfgang Amadeus Mozart: Le nozze di Figaro, Den Norske Opera – Kunsthøgskolen I Oslo.
- 2018 Wolfgang Amadeus Mozart: Don Giovanni, Salzburger Landestheater.
- 2018 Wolfgang Amadeus Mozart: Così fan tutte, Salzburger Landestheater.
- 2018 Wolfgang Amadeus Mozart: Così fan tutte, Ente concerti Marialisa de Carolis, Sassari.
- 2018 George Frideric Handel: Rinaldo, Teatro Ponchielli, Cremona.
- 2018 Giuseppe Verdi: Aida, Theater Dortmund.
- 2019 Engelbert Humperdinck: Hänsel und Gretel, Den Norske Opera – Kunsthøgskolen I Oslo.
- 2019 Georges Bizet: Carmen, Macerata Opera Festival.
- 2019 Alessandro Melani: L'empio punito, Teatro di Pisa.
- 2019 Gioachino Rossini: Ermione, Teatro San Carlo Napoli.
