= Laurence Kaptain =

American symphonic cimbalom artist

Laurence Kaptain (born 1952 in Elgin, Illinois, US) is an American symphonic cimbalom artist. He is dean of the College of Arts & Media University of Colorado Denver and has served as Dean of the Louisiana State University College of Music & Dramatic Arts, where he was a faculty member in the School of Music. Until 2009, he served as dean of Shenandoah Conservatory in Winchester, Virginia. From 2004 to 2006 he was director of the Schwob School of Music at Columbus State University in Columbus, Georgia. In 2014 he was named a fellow of Royal Society of Arts.

== Biography ==
Born to a father of Hungarian ancestry, Kaptain was exposed to the cimbalom at an early age at ethnic social functions in his hometown of Elgin, Illinois and later was awarded a grant to study cimbalom in Budapest, Hungary. He was the first individual to receive the Doctor of Musical Arts degree in percussion instruments from the University of Michigan and has served on the faculty of several conservatories and university music programs.

== Career ==
=== Academic career ===
Kaptain began his academic career as a professor of percussion and subsequently held faculty appointments at the University of Missouri–Kansas City Conservatory, Drake University, Stephen F. Austin State University, and visiting appointments at the University of Michigan, Oberlin Conservatory, and the University of Wisconsin–Madison.

He later moved into academic administration, serving as Vice Provost for Faculty Programs and Academic Quality at the University of Missouri–Kansas City. In 2004, he was appointed director of the Schwob School of Music at Columbus State University in Georgia. He subsequently became dean of Shenandoah Conservatory in Virginia, where he led academic and artistic initiatives prior to joining Louisiana State University.

In 2009, Kaptain was appointed dean and Penniman Family Professor of Music at Louisiana State University's College of Music and Dramatic Arts. During his tenure, the college expanded fundraising efforts, international engagement, student diversity, and faculty creative activity. He also served as founding director of Creative Initiatives in LSU's Office of Research and Economic Development.

In 2014, he became dean of the College of Arts and Media at the University of Colorado Denver. During his eight-year tenure, he promoted interdisciplinary arts education, international study programs, industry partnerships, and arts integration initiatives. He stepped down as dean in 2022 and became Special Assistant to the Provost, focusing on international programs and strategic initiatives. As of 2026, he remains affiliated with the University of Colorado Denver as a professor.

=== Performance career ===
Born to a father of Hungarian ancestry, Kaptain was introduced to the cimbalom through Hungarian cultural traditions in his hometown of Elgin, Illinois. He later studied the instrument in Budapest through a grant-supported program and developed a career as one of the few American specialists in symphonic cimbalom performance.

Throughout his career, Kaptain has collaborated with artists including Yo-Yo Ma, Gil Shaham, Dawn Upshaw, Monica Germino, Lucy Shelton, Elvis Costello, Isaac Stern, Rudolf Nureyev, Suzanne Farrell, Pierre Boulez, Karlheinz Stockhausen, and Robert Altman. He has performed under conductors including Sir Georg Solti, Kurt Masur, Leonard Slatkin, James Levine, Neeme Järvi, Alan Gilbert, Valery Gergiev, and Charles Dutoit.

His recordings include performances with the Chicago Symphony Orchestra, St. Louis Symphony Orchestra, Orpheus Chamber Orchestra, St. Paul Chamber Orchestra, and Czech National Symphony. A recording of Igor Stravinsky works with the Orpheus Chamber Orchestra received the Grammy Award for Best Small Ensemble Performance in 2001.

== Research and scholarship ==
Kaptain's scholarly work focuses on arts leadership, music education, higher-education administration, Mexican musical traditions, and the marimba culture of southern Mexico. His Fulbright research in Chiapas, Mexico, led to extensive documentation of regional marimba traditions and cultural practices. He has served as a consultant, lecturer, and adjudicator throughout Mexico and has promoted cultural exchange programs between the United States and Latin America.

He is the author of The Wood That Sings: The Marimba in Chiapas, Mexico (1992), a study of the history and cultural significance of the Chiapan marimba tradition. The work was translated into Spanish as Maderas que Cantan and published in Mexico. He also translated Arturo Chamorro's The Percussion Instruments of Mexico and contributed entries on marimba performance and Mexican musical traditions to major music reference works, including the Encyclopedia of Percussion and the Encyclopedia of Popular Music of the World.

In higher education, Kaptain has published on performing-arts leadership, institutional planning, creativity in higher education, arts entrepreneurship, and academic administration. He co-founded and served as co-editor of the ''Journal of Performing Arts Leadership in Higher Education, a publication devoted to leadership issues in arts and music education.

== Honors and awards ==
Kaptain was a Fulbright Scholar to Mexico and recipient of the Rackham Graduate School Pre-Doctoral Fellowship at the University of Michigan. He was also the inaugural recipient of the Charles Owen–James Salmon Percussion Award.

In 2014, he was elected a Fellow of the Royal Society of Arts (FRSA). He has served in leadership positions with numerous professional organizations, including the College Music Society, the Association for General and Liberal Studies, the Arts School Network, and the Alliance for the Arts in Research Universities.

His recording with the Orpheus Chamber Orchestra was part of the ensemble's Grammy Award-winning 2001 recording recognized in the chamber music category.

== Albums ==
- Suite from Hary Janos (Kodály), Chicago Symphony Orchestra, Neeme Järvi, conductor (solo cimbalom). Recorded February, 1990 (released Spring, 1991). Chandos (CHAN 8877)..
- Suite from Hary Janos (Kodály), St. Louis Symphony Orchestra, Leonard Slatkin, conductor (solo cimbalom). Recorded February, 1993 (released November, 2007). AAM 070106
- Suite from Hary Janos (Kodály), Chicago Symphony Orchestra, Sir Georg Solti, conductor (solo cimbalom). Recorded November, 1993. U.S. release (11/94): Mephisto Magic (London/Decca 443 444-2), European release (10/94): The Hungarian Connection (Decca 443 444-2).
- Renard, Ragtime (Stravinsky), St. Paul Chamber Orchestra, Hugh Wolff, music director. Teldec 4509-94548-2.
- Bartók Rhapsody No. 1 for Violin and Orchestra. Chicago Symphony, Pierre Boulez, Principal Guest Conductor with Gil Shaham, violin. CD recording for Deutsche Grammophon DGG 289 459 639-2. 2000.
- Ragtime (Stravinsky), Orpheus Chamber Ensemble (New York City), Deutsche Grammophon, 289 453458-2. 2001

== Bibliography ==
- Kaptain, Laurence D. The Wood that Sings: The Marimba in Chiapas, Mexico. Honeyrock, 1992.
- Kaptain, Laurence D. "Maderas que cantan." Tuxtla Gutiérrez, Chiapas, México : Gobierno del Estado de Chiapas, Consejo Estatal de Fomento a la Investigación y Diifusión de la Cultura, 1991.
- Marimba." In The Encyclopedia of Popular Music of the World, Volume II: Performance and Production. London: Continuum/Cassell, 2003.
- "The Marimba in Mexico and Related Areas." In James Beck (ed.), Encyclopedia of Percussion. New York: Routledge, 2007, pp. 239–254.
- "Employing Consensus in Higher Education Performing Arts Planning and Leadership." Journal of Performing Arts Leadership in Higher Education 1 (2010).
- Kaptain, Laurence and Mark U. Reimer. "Pursuing Leadership in the Performing Arts in Higher Education: A Brief Overview." Journal of Performing Arts Leadership in Higher Education 7 (2016).
