= Ruhrtriennale =

Music and arts festival in Germany

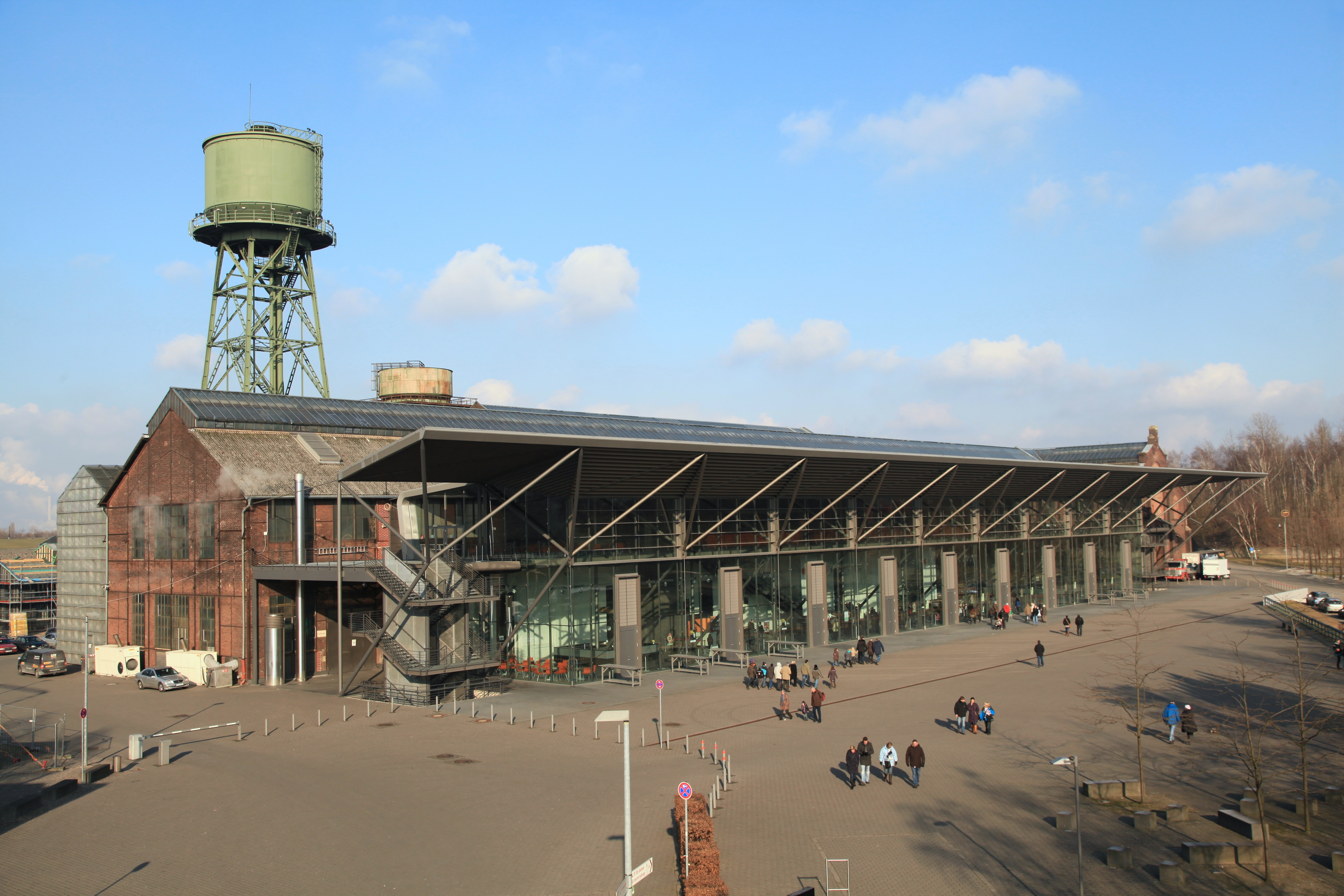
- The industrial heritage Jahrhunderthalle in Bochum
- Status: Active
- Genre: Classical music festival
- Frequency: Every three years
- Venue: Jahrhunderthalle, Bochum; Zeche Zollverein, Essen; Landschaftspark Duisburg-Nord; Maschinenhalle Zweckel, Gladbeck; and others.
- Location: Ruhr
- Inaugurated: 2002
- Founder: Government of North Rhine-Westphalia
- Website: www.ruhrtriennale.de/en

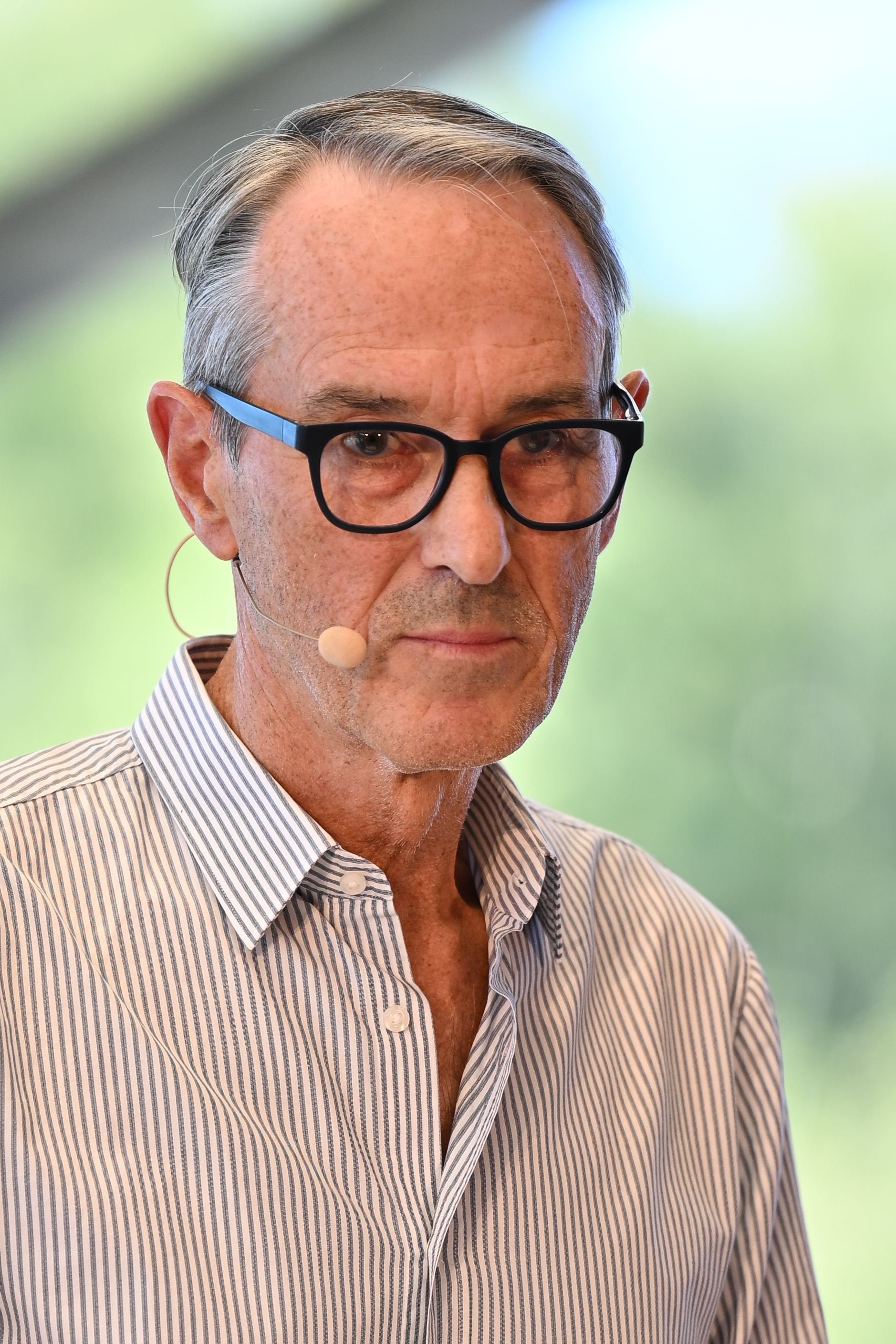
Ivo van Hove at the Ruhrtriennale 2026

The Ruhrtriennale (compound of Ruhr and triennale "lasting 3 years"), also known as Ruhr Triennale, was founded in 2002 and is a music and arts festival in the Ruhr-area of Germany which runs between mid-August and mid-October, and happens in three-year cycles. The topics of the festival focus on contemporary social and global upheavals.

== History ==
It was founded in 2002 by the government of North Rhine-Westphalia with Gerard Mortier, the impresario and former artistic director of the Salzburg Festival, as its founding director. The festival is organized into three-year cycles, each with its own theme and under different artistic directors.

Each yearly festival comprises 80 performances of 30 productions. Its central feature are the Kreationen (creations) – interdisciplinary productions uniting contemporary developments in fine art, pop, jazz and concert music. Another continuous element is the concert series, Century of Song, dedicated to the art of songwriting. The locations of the Ruhrtriennale are industrial heritage sites of the Ruhr area, which have been transformed into venues for music, theatre, literature and dance. The festival's main hall is the Jahrhunderthalle, a former early-20th-century power station in Bochum. Other locations include the Zeche Zollverein colliery in Essen, the Landschaftspark Duisburg-Nord and the Maschinenhalle Zweckel in Gladbeck.

Artists who have appeared at the festival include Ariane Mnouchkine, Peter Brook, Robert Lepage, Bill Viola, Patrice Chéreau, Ilya Kabakov, Peter Sellars, Christian Boltanski, Bill Frisell, Patti Smith, Elvis Costello, Ryoji Ikeda, Saburo Teshigawara, Akram Khan, Cecilia Bartoli, Michal Rovner (2012),Thomas Hampson and Marina Abramović

== Cycles and directors ==
Dates	Director(s)	Theme	Notes
Fall 2002– Spring 2004	Gerard Mortier		
2005–2007	Jürgen Flimm	Industrialization and arts movements	took as its theme the relationship between industrialisation and the arts, focusing in successive years on the Romantic, Baroque, and Medieval-eras. The center piece was a new production of Bernd Alois Zimmermann's opera Die Soldaten, which later travelled to New York.
2008	Jürgen Flimm	Aus der Fremde (From the Outland)	Following the death in 2007 of Marie Zimmermann, the appointed director for the 2008 to 2010 seasons, Jürgen Flimm, stayed on as artistic director for another year.
2009–2011	Willy Decker	Urmomente (Primal moments)	Its central theme Urmomente (Primal moments), describes the relationship between creativity and religion, focusing in successive years on Jewish, Islamic, and Buddhist culture.
2012–2014	Heiner Goebbels		
2015–2017	Johan Simons	Seid umschlungen (Be embraced)	theme Seid umschlungen (be embraced) from Schiller's "Ode to Joy", as "a gesture of social, political and geographical embracement".
2018–2020	Stefanie Carp and Christoph Marthaler.	Zwischenzeit (Interim)	Stefanie Carp is the first female director of the festival.
2021–2023	Barbara Frey (director)		
2024–2026	Ivo van Hove	Longing for Tomorrow	
2027–2029	Lydia Steier		The 25th anniversary of the festival will take place during the artistic direction of Lydia Steier.
