= Gerard Mortier =

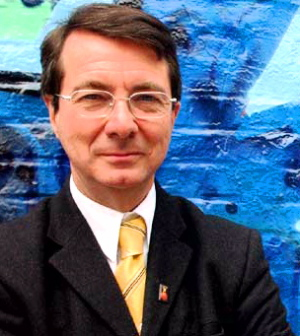
- Born: Gerard Alfons August Mortier; 25 November 1943; Ghent, Belgium
- Died: 8 March 2014 (aged 70); Brussels, Belgium
- Education: Ghent University (Law, Journalism)
- Occupations: Opera director, arts administrator
- Known for: Director of La Monnaie, Salzburg Festival, Ruhrtriennale, Paris Opera, Teatro Real
- Partner: Sylvain Cambreling
- Honours: Baron (2007), Order of Merit of the Federal Republic of Germany, Commandeur of the Ordre des Arts et des Lettres

Gerard Alfons August, Baron Mortier (25 November 1943 – 8 March 2014) was a Belgian opera director and administrator of Flemish origin known for his innovative leadership of major European opera houses, including La Monnaie, the Salzburg Festival, and the Opéra National de Paris. He promoted contemporary works, challenged traditional staging, and sought to make opera more accessible. Mortier received multiple international honours and was made a baron in 2007.

== Biography ==
Born in Ghent, the son of a baker, Mortier attended in youth the Jesuit school Sint-Barbaracollege, following the death of his mother. He subsequently studied law and journalism at Ghent University.

Mortier pursued apprenticeships in opera administration under Christoph von Dohnányi in Frankfurt and Rolf Liebermann in Paris. He worked for the Flanders Festival from 1968 to 1972. His first major administrative post was as the general director of La Monnaie (De Munt) in Brussels from 1981 to 1991, where he was credited with artistically rejuvenating the company. He subsequently held the general directorship of the Salzburg Festival from 1991 to 2001.

Mortier was the founding director of the Ruhrtriennale arts festival in Germany, leading it from 2002 to 2004. He was inspired to "a social and artistic experiment: how to attract new audiences to the classics and galvanize a depressed corner of Germany." At the same time, he was able to work his own interests in flouting tradition and attracting new audiences to the Ruhr. He put intimate productions into expansive, renovated industrial spaces. In 2003, he offered an ambitious season of

23 productions with 129 performances in 15 spaces, along with additional concerts, a fringe festival and what promises to be an astonishing installation of a Bill Viola video spectacle, Five Angels for the Millennium, inside a mighty, gorgeously restored gas tank in Oberhausen.

Planned was a production of Messiaen's Saint François d'Assise in September 2003. Mortier had a "current of spirituality meant to infuse these cathedrals of industry", and emphasized a French subtext in 2003, compared to a German one the year before. He had "faith that audiences will eventually respond to the experimentation by him and his successors."

Mortier served as general director of the Opéra National de Paris from 2004 to 2009.

In February 2007, the New York City Opera (NYCO) named him their next general director, effective as of the 2009/2010 season. Mortier assisted with company operations from Paris during the interim period after his appointment was announced. Problems with fund-raising and a smaller-than-expected budget began to develop during the interim period after his appointment. In addition, Mortier was campaigning for a position as co-artistic director of the Bayreuth Festival. In November 2008, Mortier resigned when it became clear that the board would not give him the money needed to produce a meaningful slate of opera productions.

Also in November 2008, Mortier accepted the position of artistic director of the Teatro Real in Madrid. While in New York, he had already commissioned a new opera, Brokeback Mountain, with the American composer Charles Wuorinen and a libretto by Annie Proulx, who wrote the original short story on which it is based. This was one of the projects Mortier took with him to the Teatro Real, and it was completed in 2012.

In September 2013, Mortier disclosed publicly his condition of cancer. During the search for his successor, he made controversial comments that he did not know of a fully qualified Spanish candidate to succeed him, and mentioned concerns about the expressed government interference in the choice of successor and their wish to have only a Spanish candidate succeed him. Later that month, following the appointment of Joan Matabosch as the company next's artistic director, Mortier was named artistic advisor of the company. On 28 January 2014, Brokeback Mountain premiered in Madrid. The production had been highly anticipated in the international season, and it was considered also a tribute to Mortier, "and a testament to his tireless support of the artists who work with him."

Mortier died of pancreatic cancer in Brussels on 8 March 2014, aged 70. Survivors include his sister Rita and his longtime companion, conductor Sylvain Cambreling. In April 2014, Mortier was posthumously awarded the Lifetime Achievement Award in the International Opera Awards 2014.

== Legacy and honors ==
- Honorary doctorate University of Antwerp, Belgium
- Honorary doctorate University of Salzburg, Austria
- National medal of honor from Belgium
- Order of Merit of the Federal Republic of Germany (1991)
- French Commandeur des Arts et des Lettres
- Member of the Academy of Arts of Berlin
- Golden medal of the Círculo de Bellas Artes of Madrid
- Created a Baron by the King Albert II of the Belgians 30 May 2007.

=== Publications ===
- Dramaturgie d'une passion, 2009.

=== Posthumous ===
- 2014, the Gerard Mortier Award was established in his name, to be given biannually, by Opernwelt magazine and the Ring Award, for music theatre. He himself was the first recipient, named just before his death.
- 2014, Diaghilev Prize, "for his [Mortier's] enormous contribution to the arts and for his outstanding role in the development of musical theatre. The prize money will fund the Russian publication of his book, Dramaturgie einer Leidenschaft, a manifesto-cum-memoir."
- 2014, Goethe Medal
