= Strahlen =

Music by Karlheinz Stockhausen

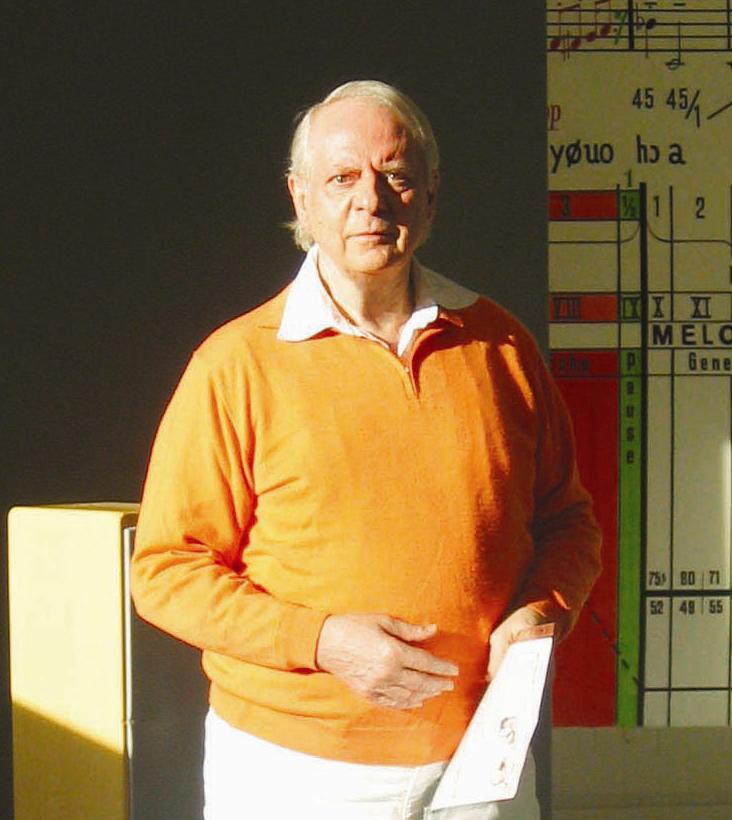
Karlheinz Stockhausen (2005)

Strahlen (Rays) for a percussionist (vibraphone and/or glockenspiel) and ten-channel sound recording is a composition by Karlheinz Stockhausen, and is Nr. 80½ in his catalog of works. Its performing duration is 35 minutes.

== History ==
Strahlen was composed in 2002, as a version of Hoch-Zeiten for choir, the fifth scene of Stockhausen's opera Sonntag aus Licht. It was commissioned by the Zentrum für Kunst und Mediatechnologie (ZKM), Karlsruhe, with support from the Kunststiftung Nordrhein-Westfalen. For a performance, any nine of the ten channels of recorded sound are played back, and the remaining part is played live by the soloist.

Work on the ten-channel electronic music for Strahlen was begun in 2003 by the ZKM, but was interrupted in 2004 in favour of producing the visual elements for the third scene of Sonntag, Licht-Bilder. A preliminary version of the recording was used for the world premiere, on the occasion of the tenth anniversary of the ZKM on 4 December 2009, at the Museum für Neue Kunst in Karlsruhe, with László Hudacsek, vibraphone, and Kathinka Pasveer, sound projection. The final version of the electronic music was mixed down to ten tracks by Holger Stenschke and Kathinka Pasveer from 13 to 21 September 2010 at the ZKM.

== Conception and form ==
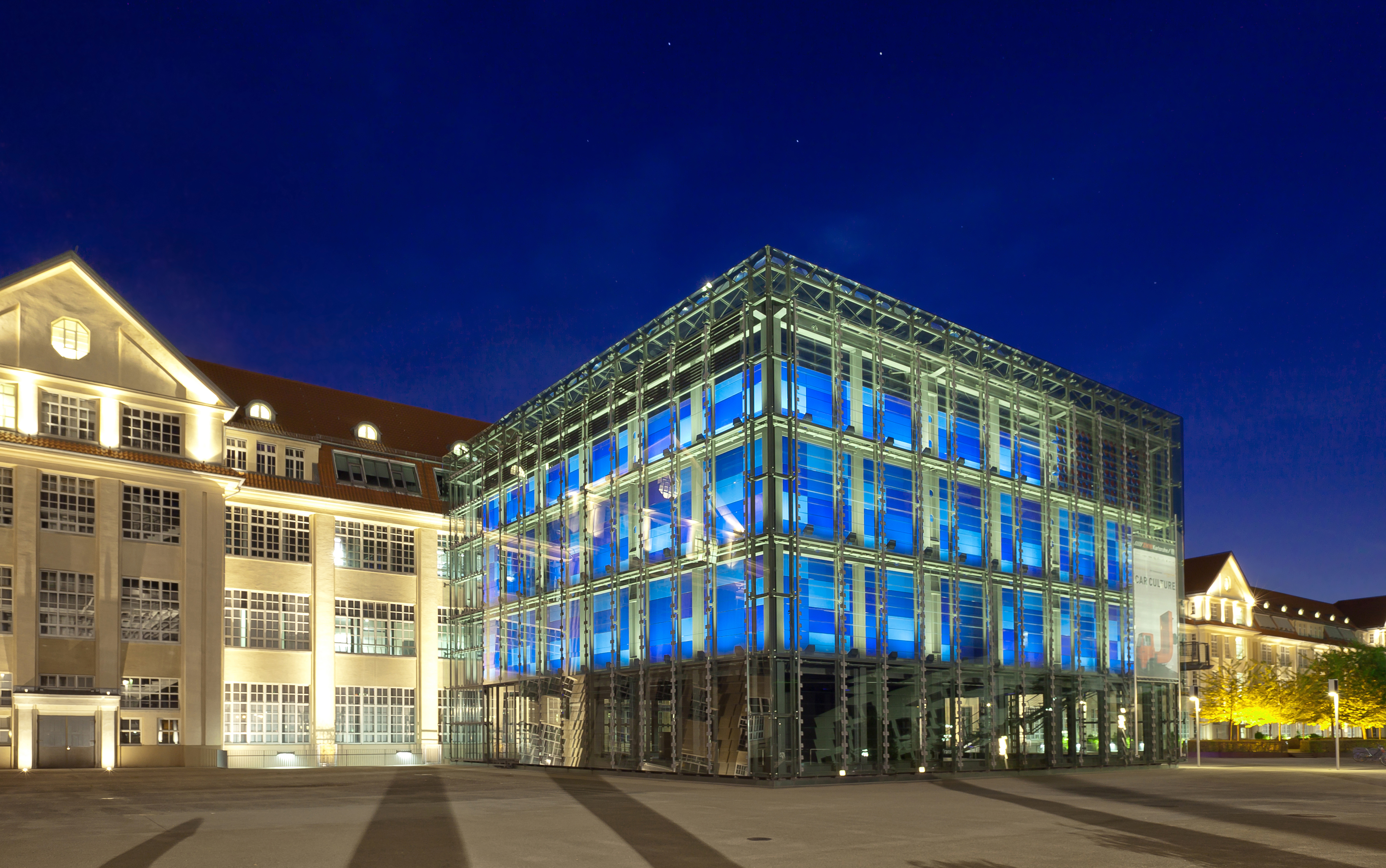
ZKM Karlsruhe, where the ten-channel electronic music was produced

The work's title suggests an impression of overwhelming radiance. The central idea of the composition is the simultaneous layering of five different tempos. These are chosen in various combinations from a scale of seven metronomic tempos: 30, 40, 53.5, 71, 95, 134, and 180 per minute. The selection of tempos can focus on the faster or slower tempos, or combinations emphasizing the strongest oppositions. Many of the notated durations are longer than the vibraphone can sustain. For this reason, the sounds in the recording are lengthened electronically and amplitude modulated to supply an internal pulsation that defines the tempo for each layer. The pitches are drawn from the five melodic lines of the form scheme for Hoch-Zeiten for choir. This form scheme in turn consists of the final (Sunday) segment of the three-layered Licht superformula, with a superimposed faster version of the entire superformula compressed to the same length (only with the Lucifer layer left out). Each of these five lines is partitioned according to its changes of pitch into seven segments. Because the pitches in the different lines do not always change at the same time, the segmentation is different in each layer, and the composite changes produce a series of slow chord changes with fourteen phases. These fourteen phases also determine the tempo changes in each layer. For example, the five layers at the beginning (from high to low) are in tempos 30, 40, 95, 71, and 53.5. At the second of the fourteen sections, only the second layer changes, from 40 to 134, while the other four layers continue at their previous speeds and pitches. At the third chord, the upper four parts all change immediately, while the lowest layer begins a slow accelerando, and so on. An extra section, corresponding to the final fermata of the superformula, is added at the end. This is a quotation of the Sunday Song from the Sieben Lieder der Tage (Seven Songs of the Days), from Evas Lied, act 2, scene 4 of Montag aus Licht. Two inserts and a short introduction are also added. Each of the five layers is then composed out into two heterophonic parts, bringing the total number of parts to ten.

== Discography ==
- Karlheinz Stockhausen: Strahlen/Rays (2002) für einen Schlagzeuger und 10-kanalige Tonaufnahme. László Hudacsek, vibraphone; Kathinka Pasveer, sound projection. Stockhausen Complete Edition CD 75. Kürten: Stockhausen-Verlag, 2011.
