= Licht =

Opera cycle by Karlheinz Stockhausen

Licht Die sieben Tage der Woche
- Opera cycle by Karlheinz Stockhausen
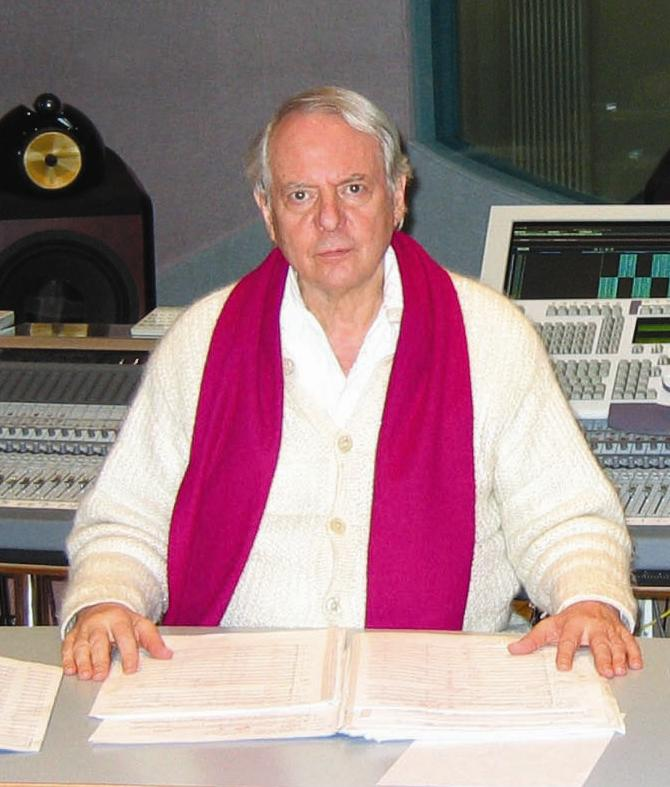
- The librettist and composer in March 2004
- Translation: Light – The Seven Days of the Week
- Librettist: Stockhausen
- Language: German
- Premiere: 1981 to 2012: La Scala, Milan; * Donnerstag 1981; * Samstag 1984; * Montag 1988; Oper Leipzig; * Dienstag 1993; * Freitag 1996; Cologne Opera; * Sonntag 2011; Birmingham Opera Company; * Mittwoch 2012

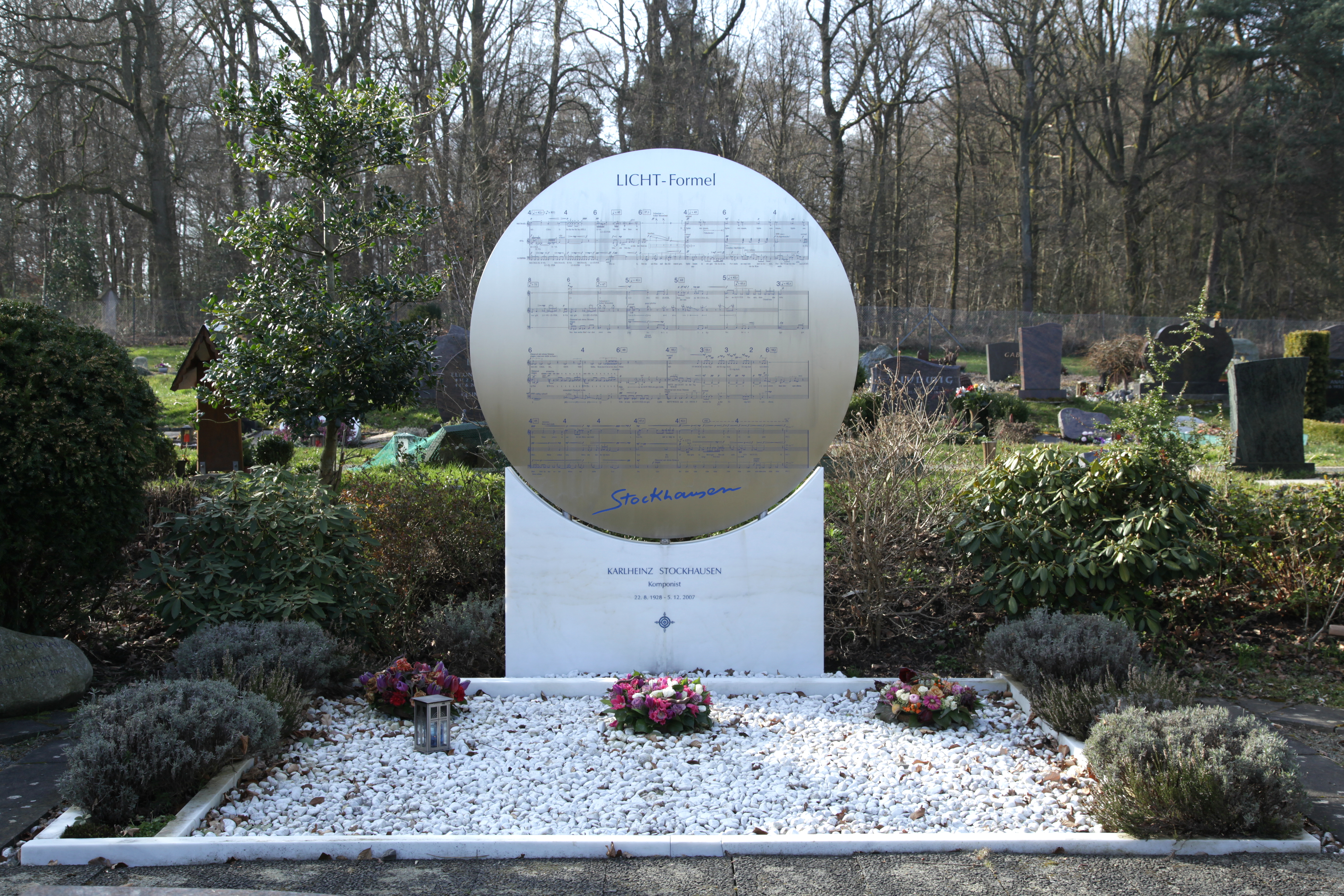
Karlheinz Stockhausens grave with the score to LICHT .

Licht (Light), subtitled "Die sieben Tage der Woche" (The Seven Days of the Week), is a cycle of seven operas composed by Karlheinz Stockhausen between 1977 and 2003. The composer described the work as an "eternal spiral" because "there is neither end nor beginning to the week." Licht consists of 29 hours of music.

== Origin ==
The Licht opera project, originally titled Hikari (光, Japanese for "light"), originated with a piece for dancers and Gagaku orchestra commissioned by the National Theatre in Tokyo. Titled Der Jahreslauf (The Course of the Years), this piece became the first act of Dienstag. Another important Japanese influence is from Noh theater, which the composer cites in connection with his conception of stage action. The cycle also draws on elements from the Judeo-Christian and Vedic traditions. The title of Licht owes something to Sri Aurobindo's theory of "Agni" (the Hindu and Vedic fire deity), developed from two basic premises of nuclear physics, and Stockhausen's conception of the Licht superformula also owes a great deal to Sri Aurobindo's category of the "supramental". It is centered on three main characters, Michael, Eve, and Lucifer.

Many of the events in the opera refer to The Urantia Book, which was sold to Stockhausen by a remarkable figure during his New York Philharmonic concert in 1971. In his analysis of the cycle, Gregg Wager states that "There can be little doubt ... that Stockhausen's first and foremost inspiration for Lucifer's rebellion ... originated from the Urantia Book ... specific terms such as "Local System", "Planetary Princes" or "Paradise Sons" can only be from the Urantia Book". Wager also points to the fact that Michael is clearly identified in Donnerstag as originating from "Nebadon", which is another location name peculiar to the Urantia Book. The emblems of Michael and Lucifer in Licht are also derived from the Urantia Book.

According to Stockhausen biographer Michael Kurtz, "Michael, Lucifer and Eve are, for Stockhausen, more than theatrical figures. They are the expression of a world beyond, to which terrestrial eyes are blind, but which is given concrete form by The Urantia Book and other sources." Wager also takes care to assert that Lucifer, Eve, and Michael are "personal inventions of Stockhausen's that were made more meaningful through the Urantia Book. ... The listener can also assume that Stockhausen has used these symbols freely and enjoys the style of absurdist theater manifested in Originale where no clear meaning is apparent." Furthermore, according to Markus Bandur, the Urantia Book references are concealed by means of associative strategies to other fields of meaning and, as work progressed on Licht after the first-composed opera, Donnerstag, their significance progressively diminishes. The importance of the Urantia Book for Stockhausen's work should not be overestimated.

== Structure ==
The musical structure of the cycle is based on three counterpointed main melodies (or "formulas"), each associated with a central character. It follows the method of super-formula composition: these melodies define both the tonal centers and durations of scenes as a whole, as well as the melodic phrasing in detail. Each of the three central characters is also associated with an instrument: Michael with the trumpet, Eve with the basset horn, and Lucifer with the trombone. [See (Stockhausen 1978): the Licht superformula.]

Stockhausen's conception of opera is more akin to the tableaux of the Renaissance masque and its hermetic cosmology than to traditional dramatic and climactic structures typical of the past two centuries. Because of its circular structure, in which the seven days of the week must be passed through again and again, a moral critique is rendered impossible, since the themes of the days perpetually return as permanent features of reality. This in turn reflects Stockhausen's theological outlook, which offers a perspective beyond the superficial differences and opposites that place limitations on thought and hope. Licht is not therefore primarily about the conflict between good and evil, but rather is a drama of latent tensions concerning a dispute about different conceptions of reality.

The cycle is constructed modularly. Not only is each of the seven operas a self-sufficient work, but so are the individual acts, scenes, and—in some cases—portions of scenes. These modules may be segments (e.g., the eleven instrumental solo sections from Orchester-Finalisten from Mittwoch), or layers (e.g., the electronic Oktophonie layer from the second act of Dienstag or the Klavierstück XIII version of the first scene of Samstag (Luzifers Traum), with the bass voice omitted), or a combination of the two (e.g., the vocal sextet Menschen, hört and the Bassetsu-Trio, which are two layers of the "Karusel" subscene from Michaelion, the fourth scene of Mittwoch).

== The seven days ==
There are seven operas, each named for a day of the week, whose subject matter reflects attributes associated in traditional mythologies with each day. These attributes in turn rest on the seven planets of Antiquity (and their associated deities) from which the day-names are derived:

- Monday = The Moon
- Tuesday = Mars
- Wednesday = Mercury
- Thursday = Jupiter
- Friday = Venus
- Saturday = Saturn
- Sunday = The Sun

Stockhausen sought to fashion the subjects for each opera through absorption in the traditions of this planet and immersion into the intuitive meaning of each day of the week—meanings of which most people are not aware. The cycle has neither a "beginning" nor an "ending"; like the days of the week, each opera leads to the next one, so that the conflict of Tuesday is followed by the reconciliation of Wednesday, and the mystical union of Sunday prepares the way for the new life of Monday. "In this way there is neither end nor beginning to the week. It is an eternal spiral". Each opera is composed from an elaborated form of the corresponding day-segment of the superformula, made by superimposing one or more complete lines from the superformula, compressed to the length of the day-segment. These are named for the day in question (e.g., Mittwoch-Formel.) The separate acts and scenes often involve further superimpositions of formula material. For example, "Luzifers Traum", the first scene of Samstag, has a total of five layers.

Each day is also assigned a principal (or "exoteric") colour, as well as one or more secondary (or "esoteric") colours.

=== Monday (1984–1988) ===
Montag, composed between 1984 and 1988, is dedicated to Eve. It features an orchestra with synthesizers (called a "modern orchestra" by Stockhausen), backing 21 performers (14 voices, 6 instruments and an actor), as well as adult and children's choirs. The opera is in three acts, framed by a "greeting" and a "farewell." (This framing applies, with variation, to each opera in the cycle: a "greeting" either in the foyer of the opera house or in the auditorium, and a "farewell" after the performance, played either in the auditorium or outside the theater.) Monday's exoteric colour is bright green; its esoteric colours are opal and silver. The scenes and subscenes are as follows:

- Montags-Gruß (Monday's Greeting)
- Act 1: Evas Erstgeburt (Eve's First Birth-giving)
  - scene 1: In Hoffnung (Expecting)
  - scene 2: Heinzelmännchen
  - scene 3: Geburts-Arien (Birth Arias)
  - scene 4: Knaben-Geschrei (Boys' Hullaballoo)
  - scene 5: Luzifers Zorn (Lucifer's Fury)
  - scene 6: Das große Geweine (The Great Weeping)
- Act 2: Evas Zweitgeburt (Eve's Second Birth-giving)
  - scene 1: Mädchenprozession (Girls' Prozession)
  - scene 2: Befruchtung mit Klavierstück—Wiedergeburt (Conception with Piano Piece—Rebirth)
  - scene 3: Evas Lied (Eve's Song)
- Act 3: Evas Zauber (Eve's Magic)
  - scene 1: Botschaft (Message)
  - scene 2: Der Kinderfänger (The Pied Piper) [literally, "The Child-Catcher"]
  - scene 3: Entführung (Abduction)
- Montags-Abschied (Monday's Farewell)

445 photos of Montag aus Licht at La Scala, Milan, Google Arts & Culture

=== Tuesday (1977–1991) ===
After having composed the three "solo" operas (Thursday, Saturday and Monday), Stockhausen proceeded to explore all combinations of the characters. Dienstag is the day of conflict between Michael and Lucifer. After the opening greeting, two acts follow: Jahreslauf (Course of the Years) and Invasion-Explosion mit Abschied (Invasion-Explosion with Farewell). Dienstag is an opera for 17 performers (three solo voices, ten solo instrumentalists, and four dancer-mimes), actors, mimes, choir, a "modern orchestra" (29 to 32 instruments including synthesizers) and, in the second act, electronic music (titled "Oktophonie") projected in eight channels, with loudspeakers arranged at the corners of a cube shape around the audience. Since it is a "layer," this taped octophonic electronic music may be heard by itself. Tuesday's colour is red. The opera falls into the following sections and subsections:

- Dienstags-Gruß, Nr. 60 (1987–88)
  - Willkommen
  - Friedens-Gruß
- Act 1: Jahreslauf (Course of the Years), Nr. 47 (1977/1991)
- Act 2: Invasion-Explosion mit Abschied (Invasion-Explosion with Farewell), Nr. 61 (1990–91)
  - Erste Luftabwehr (First Air-defense)
  - Erste Invasion (First Invasion)
  - Zweite Luftabwehr (Second Air-defense)
  - Zweite Invasion (Second Invasion)
  - Pietà
  - Dritte Invasion (Third Invasion)
  - Jenseits (Beyond)
  - Synthi-Fou
  - Abschied (Farewell)

=== Wednesday (1992–1998) ===
Mittwoch is characterized by the cooperation of Eve, Michael and Lucifer. Composed between 1992 and 1998, the opera consists of four scenes: Welt-Parlament (World Parliament), Orchester-Finalisten (Orchestra Finalists), Helikopter-Streichquartett (Helicopter String Quartet), and Michaelion. The third scene, which has acquired a certain celebrity, is scored, as its name implies, for four stringed instruments and four helicopters, the latter used both as a performatic device and a sound source. The greeting for Mittwoch is the electronic part of scene 4; the farewell is the electronic music from scene 2. The latter, like the electronic music for act 2 of Dienstag, is projected octophonically through speakers arranged at the corners of a cube surrounding the audience. Wednesday's colour is bright yellow. The main divisions and their subdivisions are:

- Mittwochs-Gruß
- Scene 1: Welt-Parlament
- Scene 2: Orchester-Finalisten
  - Oboe
  - Violoncello
  - Klarinette
  - Fagott
  - Violine
  - Tuba
  - Flöte
  - Posaune
  - Viola
  - Trompete
  - Kontrabaß
  - Horn
  - Orchester-Tutti
- Scene 3: Helikopter-Streichquartett (1993)
- Scene 4: Michaelion
  - Präsidium
  - Luzikamel
    - Kakabel
    - Shoe-Shine Serenade
    - Taschen-Trick (Pocket Trick)
    - Kamel-Tanz (Camel Dance)
    - Stierkampf (Bullfight)
  - Operator
    - Thinki
    - Bassetsu Trio (Karussell) (Carousel)
    - "Menschen, hört" (Raum-Sextette) ("Listen, People"—Space-Sextet)
- Mittwochs-Abschied

=== Thursday (1978–1980) ===
Donnerstag is an opera for 14 performers (three voices, eight instrumentalists, three dancers) plus a choir, an orchestra, and tapes. Though not the first part of Licht to be started, it was the first opera in the cycle to be completed, having been written between 1978 and 1980. Thursday is the day of the archangel Michael, and the story is centered on this character. It opens in the foyer with a "greeting" for an ensemble of brass and percussion, followed in the theater by three acts, and ends outside the theater with a "farewell", played from the surrounding rooftops by five trumpeters. The 16-channel tape composition Unsichtbare Chöre (Invisible Choirs, 1979) is incorporated into act 1, and again into act 3, scene 1. Stockhausen's Klavierstück XII is an arrangement of act 1, scene 3, and a number of other segments were arranged by the composer for separate performance. Thursday's exoteric colour is bright blue. It is made up of the following parts:

- Donnerstags-Gruß (Thursday's Greeting)
- Act 1: Michaels Jugend (Michael's Youth; employs Unsichtbare Chöre)
  - scene 1: Kindheit (Childhood)
  - scene 2: Mondeva (Moon-Eve)
  - scene 3: Examen (Examination)
    - Erstes Examen (First Examination)
    - Zweites Examen (Second Examination)
    - Drittes Examen (Third Examination)
- Act 2: Michaels Reise um die Erde
  - Eingang und Formel (Entrance and Formula)
  - Erste Station (First Station): Germany
  - Zweite Station (Second Station): New York
  - Dritte Station (Third Station): Japan
  - Vierte Station (Fourth Station): Bali
  - Fünfte Station (Fifth Station): India
  - Sechste Station (Sixth Station): Central Africa
  - Siebte Station (Seventh Station): Jerusalem
  - Mission
    - Verspottung (Derision)
    - Kreuzigung (Crucifixion)
    - Himmelfahrt (Ascension)
- Act 3: Michaels Heimkehr (Michael's Homecoming)
  - scene 1: Festival (employs Unsichtbare Chöre)
  - scene 2: Vision
- Donnerstags-Abschied (Thursday's Farewell)

286 photos of Donnerstag aus Licht, Google Arts & Culture

=== Friday (1991–1994) ===
Freitag, written between 1991 and 1994, portrays Eve's temptation by Lucifer. The whole is divided into two acts, and has a novel structure: apart from the greeting and farewell, it is composed of two layers of scenes: ten "real scenes" with live performers on stage and twelve "sound scenes" with electronic transformations of familiar sounds, both performed simultaneously over a third layer of abstract electronic music. It is a complex production headed by five acting musicians (soprano, baritone, bass, flute, basset horn) as well as 12 couples of dancer-mimes, children's orchestra, children's choir, 12 choir singers, synthesizer player, electronic music with sound scenes. Friday's colour is orange. The ten "real scenes" are:

1. Antrag (Proposal)
2. Kinder-Orchester (Children's Orchestra)
3. Kinder-Chor (Children's Choir)
4. Kinder-Tutti (Children's Tutti)
5. Zustimmung (Consent)
6. Fall
7. Kinder-Krieg (Children's War)
8. Reue (Repentance)
9. Elufa
10. Chor-Spirale (Choir Spiral)

=== Saturday (1981–1983) ===
Samstag is an opera for 13 solo performers (one voice, ten instrumentalists, and two dancers) plus a symphonic band (or symphony orchestra), ballet or mimes, and male choir with organ. It was composed between 1981 and 1983. Saturday is Lucifer's day; its exoteric colour is black. The opera opens with the Samstags Gruß for four spatially separated brass ensembles with percussion, which is followed by four scenes:

- Samstags-Gruß (Saturday's Greeting)
- Scene 1: Luzifers Traum (Lucifer's Dream) (Klavierstück XIII), for bass voice and piano
- Scene 2: Kathinkas Gesang als Luzifers Requiem (Kathinka's Chant as Lucifer's Requiem), for flute and six percussionists
- Scene 3: Luzifers Tanz (Lucifer's Dance), for symphony band (or orchestra), bass voice, solo piccolo, solo piccolo trumpet, solo dancer, stilt-dancer, and dancer-mimes
  - Linker Augenbrauentanz (Left-Eyebrow Dance)
  - Rechter Augenbrauentanz (Right-Eyebrow Dance)
  - Linker Augentanz (Left-Eye Dance)
  - Rechter Augentanz (Right-Eye Dance)
  - Linker Backentanz (Left-Cheek Dance)
  - Rechter Backentanz (Right-Cheek Dance)
  - Nasenflügeltanz (Wing-of-the-Nose Dance)
  - Oberlippentanz (Upper-Lip Dance)
    - Protest
  - Zungenspitzentanz (Tip-of-the-Tongue Dance)
  - Kinntanz (Chin Dance)
- Scene 4: Luzifers Abschied (Lucifer's Farewell), for male choir, seven trombones, and organ

256 photos from Samstag aus Licht, Google Arts & Culture

=== Sunday (1998–2003) ===
Sonntag, written between 1998 and 2003, is centered on the mystical union of Eve and Michael, from which the new life of Monday is produced. It is an opera with five scenes and a farewell. The absence of Lucifer from scene 1 is explained by Stockhausen's description of an accessory scene, called Luziferium, intended to be performed simultaneously with Sonntag, but in a different place, symbolizing the imprisonment of Lucifer, away from Eve and Michael; Luziferium was sketched but never written. Scene 4 expands on the multimedia nature of opera—with its music, dance, action and scenery—by involving another human sense: fragrances are released toward the audience. Scene 5 is actually two scenes in one, and consists of two parts: Hoch-Zeiten for five choirs and Hoch-Zeiten for five orchestral groups. (These components are performed simultaneously in two separate auditoriums. At various points acoustical "windows" are opened, through which the music from the other auditorium is "piped in" through loudspeakers. The scene is performed twice. After the interval, either the choir and orchestra change halls, or the divided audience does, in order that each group of listeners may experience the scene from both perspectives.) The Farewell is an adaptation for five synthesizers of the choral part of Hoch-Zeiten, and it also exists in two further versions: one for solo percussionist with tape, Strahlen; the other as Klavierstück XIX for synthesizer and tape. The opera falls into the following parts:

- Scene 1: Lichter-Wasser (Sonntags-Gruß) (Lights-Waters—Sunday's Greeting), for soprano, tenor, and orchestra with synthesizer
- Scene 2: Engel-Prozessionen (Angel-Processions), for seven choral groups
- Scene 3: Licht-Bilder (Light-Pictures), for tenor, ring-modulated flute, basset horn, and ring-modulated trumpet
- Scene 4: Düfte-Zeichen (Scents-Signs), for 7 solo voices, boy soprano, and synthesizer
- Scene 5: Hoch-Zeiten (Weddings, but literally: High-Times), for choir and orchestra
- Sonntags-Abschied (Sunday's Farewell), for five synthesizers

== Auxiliary works ==
Apart from the versions of various scenes that can be performed separately, and arrangements of such scenes, there are some pieces that lie outside of the Licht cycle proper, and yet are closely related to it. For example, the Licht superformula itself is adapted as a brief "signalling" piece:

- Licht-Ruf, Nr. 67, for variable ensemble (1995)

Other pieces are "source" compositions, intermediate between the superformula and final compositional elaboration into parts of one of the operas.

- Michaels-Ruf, 1. ex Nr. 48 1/2, for variable ensemble (1978), the unscored basic material for the Donnerstags-Gruß
- Xi, 1. ex Nr. 55, for a melody instrument with microtones (1986), the "seed" material for the Montags-Gruß

Some others are themselves elaborated from such source compositions, but follow a separate line of development:

- Traum-Formel, Nr. 51 2/3, for basset horn (1981), a recomposition of the formula of the first scene of Samstag
- Flautina, ex 56 1/2, for flute with piccolo and alto flute (1989), related to the scene "In Hoffnung" from the first act of Montag
- Quitt, for alto flute, clarinet, and trumpet, Nr. 1 ex 59 (1989), composed out from the basic plan of the Montags-Abschied
- Ypsilon, Nr. 2 ex 59, for a melody instrument with microtones (1989), also elaborated from the Montags-Abschied plan
- Sukat, Nr. 2 ex 60, for alto flute and basset horn (1989), based on the portion of the Tuesday formula used for the Dienstags-Gruß
- Vibra-Elufa, Nr. 9 3/4 ex 64, for vibraphone (2003), based on the ninth "real scene" of Freitag (itself used as a source composition for other parts of that opera)
- Thinki, Nr. 1 ex 70, for flute (1997), recomposed from material in Michaelion, the final scene of Mittwoch

There are four pieces made of versions of the formula for Mittwoch:

- Europa-Gruss, Nr. 72, for winds (1992/1995/2002), originally conceived as the "greeting" for Mittwoch but replaced
- Trumpetent, Nr. 73, for four trumpets (1995)
- Mittwoch-Formel, Nr. 73 1/2, for percussion trio (2004)
- Klavierstück XVIII (Mittwoch-Formel), Nr. 73 2/3, for synthesizer (2004)

Also, there is

- Strahlen, Nr. 80 1/2, for a percussionist and ten-channel sound recording (2002), fashioned from Hoch-Zeiten for choir

Finally, there is:

- Litanei 97, Nr. 74, for choir and singing conductor (1997)

which sets a text from Aus den sieben Tagen (1968), incorporating fragments of the Licht superformula.

== Performances ==
Work on Licht began in 1977, and was finished in 2003, though the final scene was performed for the first time in 2004. All seven operas have been staged individually, at La Scala (Thursday, Saturday, and Monday), Covent Garden (Thursday), Leipzig Opera (Tuesday and Friday), Cologne Opera (Sunday), and Birmingham Opera Company (Wednesday, premiered on the composer's birthday, 22 August 2012). Plans had previously been made to stage Wednesday in Bonn in 2000 and in Bern in 2003, but both were canceled due to financial and technical problems. The entire cycle was broadcast in a series on SWR2 between 2001 and 2007, introduced by the composer in conversation with Reinhard Ermen.

Performing such a piece is a challenge not only due to its length, but also due to the logistics involved. Each part, and in many cases, each scene, is designed for a different configuration of musicians, ranging from scenes written for a cappella choir to orchestra with synthesizer to string quartet playing from helicopters above the concert hall.

In 2019 the Holland Festival together with Royal Conservatory of The Hague initiated a three-day immersion into Licht that was called aus LICHT. It included portions of the Licht cycle from all seven days, totaling about 15 hours of performance time. The three days/parts were:

- Michael
- Lucifer and Eve
- Cooperation and the Opening Up of Space

Performance dates were May 31 – June 2, June 4–6, and June 8–10. aus LICHT was a joint production of the Dutch National Opera, Holland Festival, Royal Conservatory of The Hague, and the Stockhausen Foundation for Music.

In 2018, the French company Le Balcon, and its musical director Maxime Pascal, began a complete stage production of the cycle. In 2018, Thursday premiered at the Opéra-Comique, staged by Benjamin Lazar; in 2019, Saturday premiered at the Philharmonie de Paris, staged by Damien Bigourdan and Nieto. In 2020, a few days before the second Covid-related lock-in, Tuesday premiered at the Philharmonie de Paris, with the same team. In 2022, Friday premiered at the Opéra de Lille, staged by Silvia Costa. In 2023, Sunday premiered at the Philharmonie de Paris, staged by Ted Huffman. The last two opuses in the complete series will be performed in 2025 (Monday, staged by Silvia Costa) and 2026 (Wednesday, stage by Susanne Kennedy).

In June 2024, five excerpts from the Dutch 2019 aus Licht adaptation were performed at the Park Avenue Armory in New York City. The performances were named as a Critic's Pick by The New York Times.

== World premières ==
- Donnerstag (Thursday) – 1981, at La Scala in Milan
- Samstag (Saturday) – May 1984, at La Scala in Milan
- Montag (Monday) – 1988, at La Scala in Milan
- Dienstag (Tuesday) – 1993, at the Leipzig Opera
- Freitag (Friday) – September 1996, at the Leipzig Opera
- Mittwoch (Wednesday) – staged première of the entire opera by Birmingham Opera Company, 22 August 2012, The Argyle Works, Birmingham; première broadcast as a whole by SWR in 2003; première stagings of the individual scenes were as follows:
  - Scene 1 Welt-Parlament ("World Parliament") – 1996, Stuttgart
  - Scene 2 Orchester-Finalisten ("Orchestra Finalists") – 1996, Holland Festival, Amsterdam
  - Scene 3 Helikopter-Streichquartett – 1995 Holland Festival, Amsterdam
  - Scene 4 Michaelion July 1998, in the Prinzregententheater, Munich
- Sonntag (Sunday) – broadcast as a whole by SWR in 2007; première staging as a whole was on 9 April (Scenes 1, 2 and 3) and 10 April (Scenes 4 and 5 and the Farewell), 2011, in Cologne
