= Riesa =

Town in Saxony, Germany

- Town
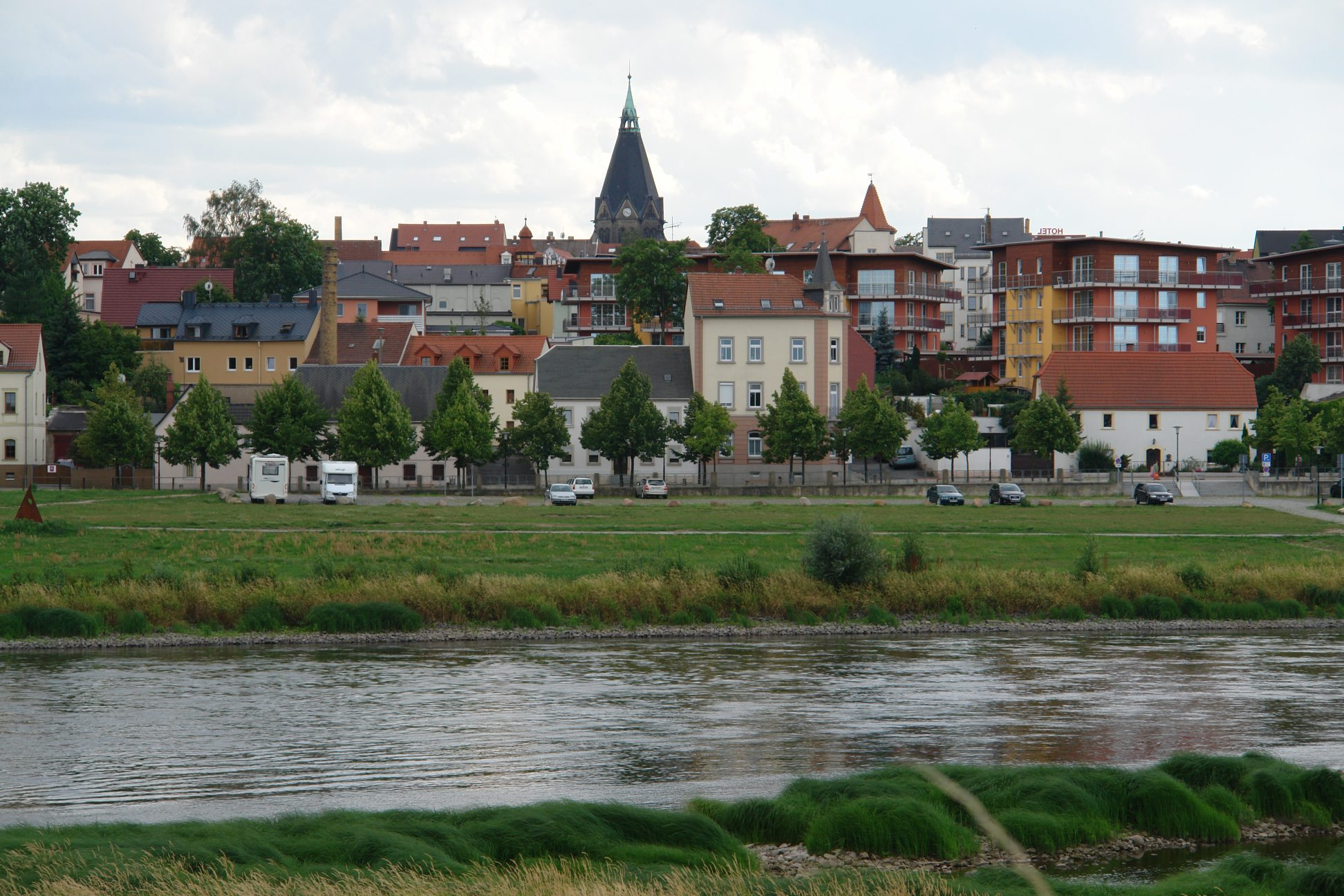
- Riesa with the Trinitatis Church near the Elbe River in July 2008

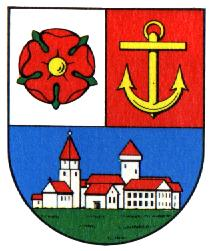
- Coat of arms

- Location of Riesa within Meißen district
- Interactive map of Riesa
- Location within Germany Location within Saxony
- Coordinates: 51°18′29″N 13°17′38″E
- Country: Germany
- State: Saxony
- District: Meißen
- Subdivisions: 16

Government
  - Mayor (2021–28): Marco Müller (CDU)

Area
  - Total: 58.91 km^{2} (22.75 sq mi)
- Elevation: 109 m (358 ft)

Population (2025-12-31)
  - Total: 29,238
  - Density: 496.3/km^{2} (1,285/sq mi)
- Time zone: UTC+01:00 (CET)
  - Summer (DST): UTC+02:00 (CEST)
- Postal codes: 01587, 01589, 01591, 01594
- Dialling codes: 03525
- Vehicle registration: MEI, GRH, RG, RIE
- Website: www.riesa.de

Riesa (German pronunciation: [ˈʁiːza]; Upper Sorbian: Ryzawa) is a town in the district of Meißen in Saxony, Germany. It is located on the river Elbe, approximately 40 kilometres (25 miles) northwest of Dresden.

== History ==
The name Riesa is derived from Slavic Riezowe. This name, romanised as "Rezoa", appears first in October 1119 in a document from Pope Callixtus II.

The world's first 110 kV power line was installed between Riesa and Lauchhammer in 1912. Between 1952 and 1994, Riesa was the seat of a district.

During the 1980s, Riesa was the headquarters of the Group of Soviet Forces in Germany's 9th Tank Division.

On 11 January 2025, the far-right party AfD held their federal party conference in Riesa. Around 12,000 people protested the conference and blocked entrances to the town.

=== Population history ===
The town grew from the start of the 20th century due to industrialisation. The population declined after German Reunification in 1989. The local steel works shut and the population fell from 52,000 to 31,000.

Historical population

Year	Pop.	±%
1575	350	—
1834	1,631	+366.0%
1849	2,679	+64.3%
1875	5,707	+113.0%
1880	6,259	+9.7%
1900	13,491	+115.5%
1933	26,248	+94.6%
1939	29,963	+14.2%
1946	34,406	+14.8%

Year	Pop.	±%
1950	36,150	+5.1%
1960	36,769	+1.7%
1981	51,857	+41.0%
1995	42,429	−18.2%
2000	39,367	−7.2%
2005	36,221	−8.0%
2010	33,351	−7.9%
2015	31,541	−5.4%
2019	29,754	−5.7%

== Sights ==
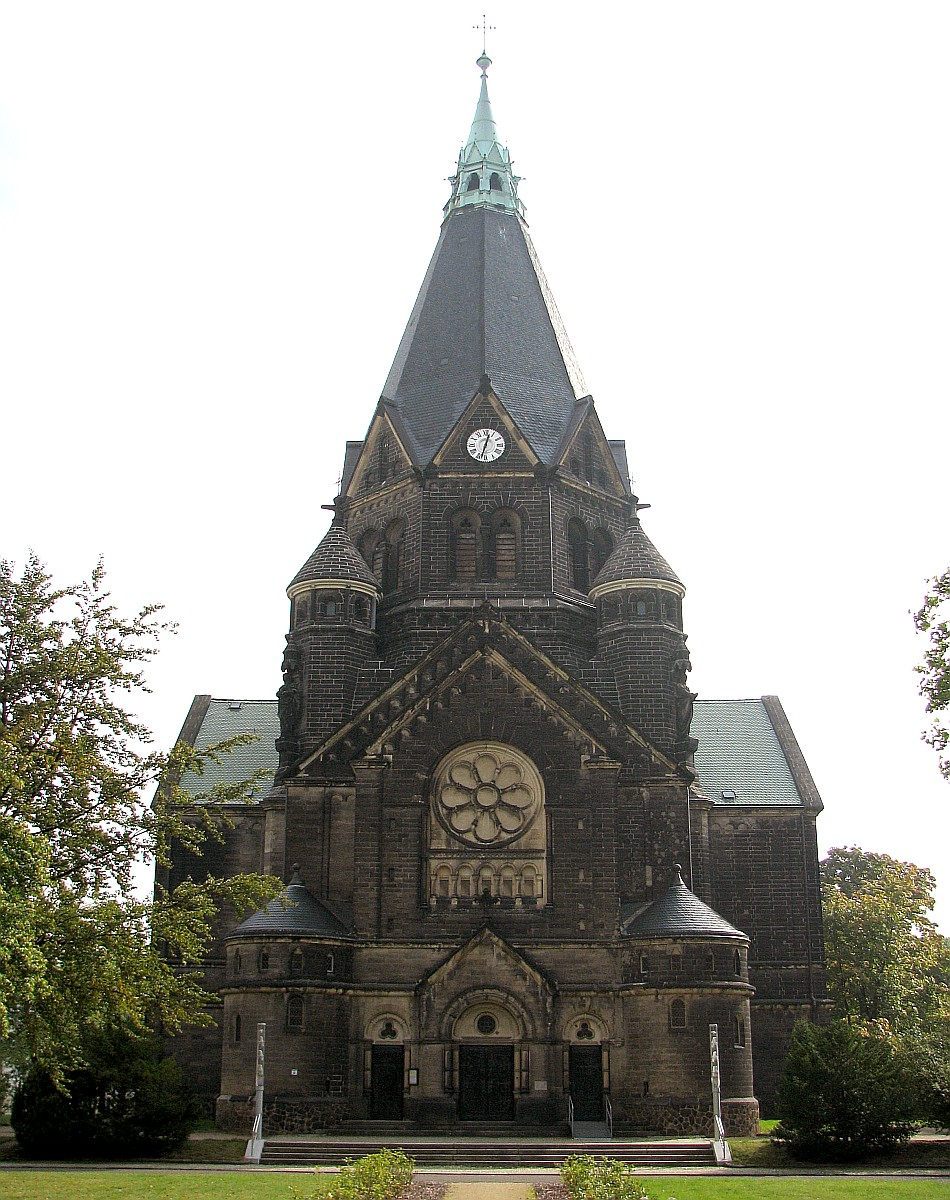
Trinitatis Church

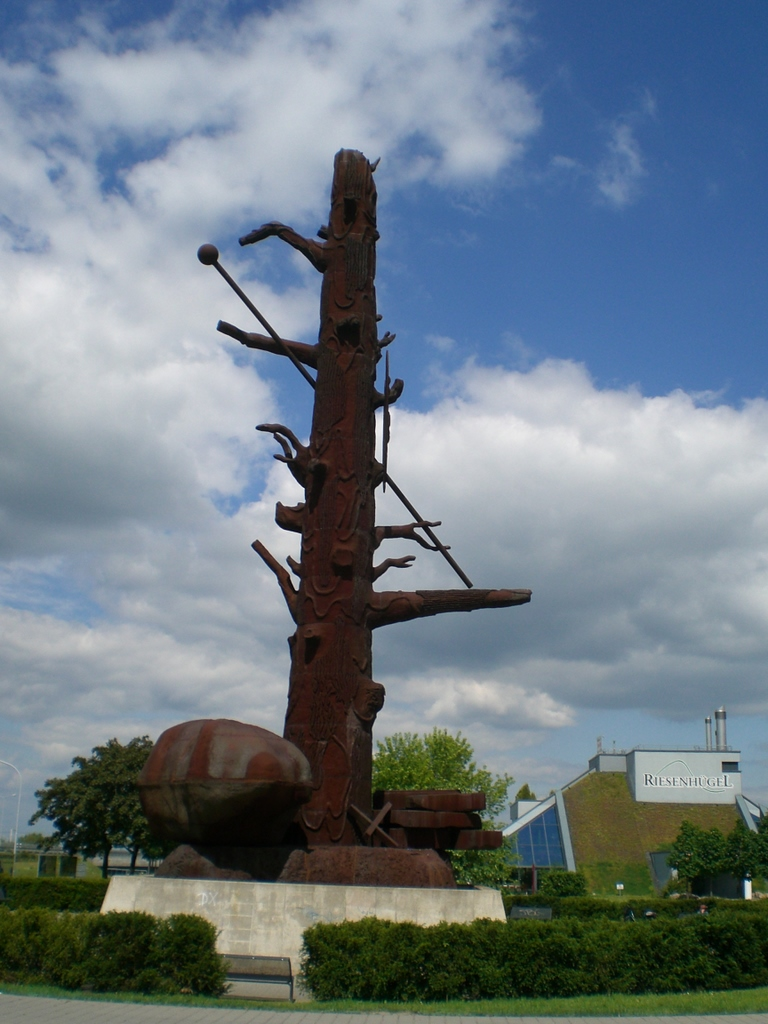
"Rusty Oak"

Riesa has a 25 m tall, 234 tonne, cast-iron (GGG 40) sculpture of an oak trunk, named Elbquelle, which means source of the Elbe, by Jörg Immendorff, erected in 1999. Local folk call the sculpture by many other names, most notably "Rostige Eiche", which means "Rusty Oak".

In Riesa there are two notable churches. The minster St. Marien was built in 1261 as an addition to the Benedictine Abbey. The Trinitatis Church was completed in 1897.

== Culture ==
Riesa is well known locally for its pasta, which is produced at Teigwaren Riesa GmbH. Another symbol of Riesa are the Riesaer Zündhölzer, the matches which were traditionally manufactured there.

Riesa is also well known for its steel production.

== Sport ==
Riesa is home to a football club, BSG Stahl Riesa, featuring a blue and white crest, which also represents the club colors. They compete in the Landesliga Sachsen, the sixth tier of German football.

Riesa is known locally for the SACHSENarena, a large hall that hosted the European Sumo Wrestling Championship in October 2003 and the World Sumo Wrestling Championship in October 2004. Since 2015, it has also been the home of the International Darts Open, one of the many events on the Professional Darts Corporation's European Tour.

== Twin towns – sister cities ==
Riesa is twinned with:

- Głogów, Poland
- Lonato del Garda, Italy
- Mannheim, Germany
- Rotherham, England, United Kingdom
- Sandy, United States
- Villerupt, France
- Wuzhong (Suzhou), China

== Transport ==
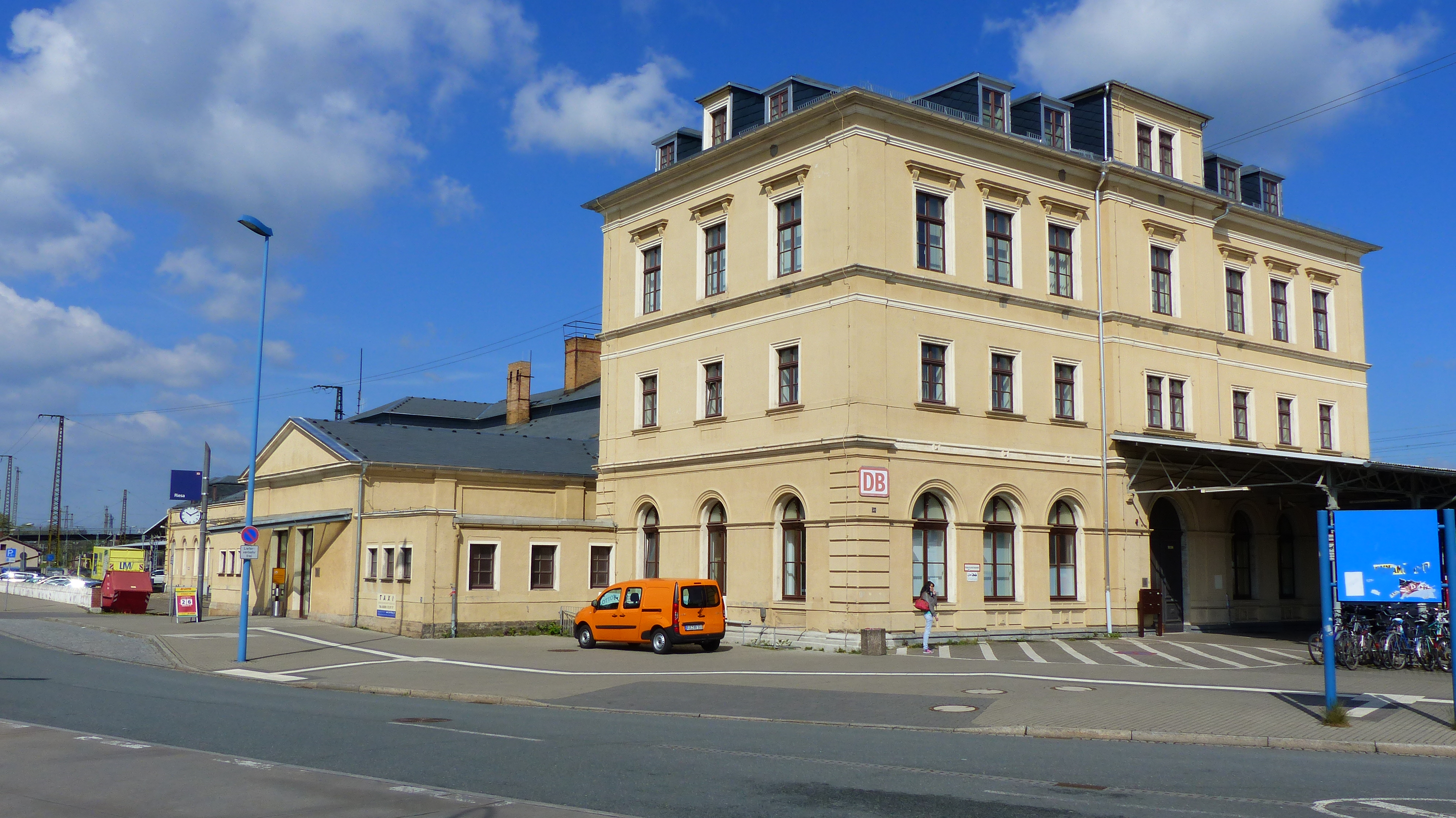
Railway station

Riesa railway station is located north of the town's centre, it offers both regional and long-distance services.

Riesa is located on Bundesstraße 169, which ensures access to federal motorways A 14 (close to Döbeln, approx. 25 km) and A 13 (close to Ruhland, approx. 50 km).

== Notable people ==
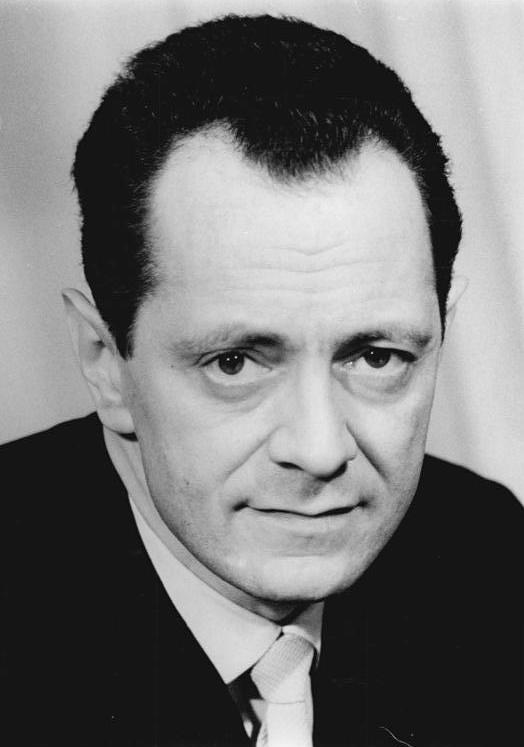
Dieter Noll

- Adolph von Carlowitz (1858–1928), Saxon officer, general of the infantry and war minister
- Johannes Müller (1864–1949), theologian
- Rolf Moebius (1915–2004), actor
- Dieter Noll (1927–2008), writer
- Lothar Kurbjuweit (born 1950), footballer
- Jürgen Schmieder (born 1952), politician
- Monika Zehrt (born 1952), athlete
- Olaf Jentzsch (born 1958), cyclist
- Heiko Peschke (born 1963), footballer
- Ulf Kirsten (born 1965), footballer
- Rüdiger Heinze (born 1971), film producer and screenwriter
- Heike Geißler (born 1977), writer
- Maximilian Arnold (born 1994), footballer

=== Associated with the town ===
- Walter Fritzsch (1920–1997), football coach
- Wolfgang Lischke (born 1947), footballer
- Peter Kotte (born 1954), footballer
- Harald Czudaj (born 1963), bobsledder
- Ralf Hauptmann (born 1968), footballer
