= Lischke =

Lischke may refer to:

- Lischke (settlement)
- Lischke (surname)
