= Trumpetent =

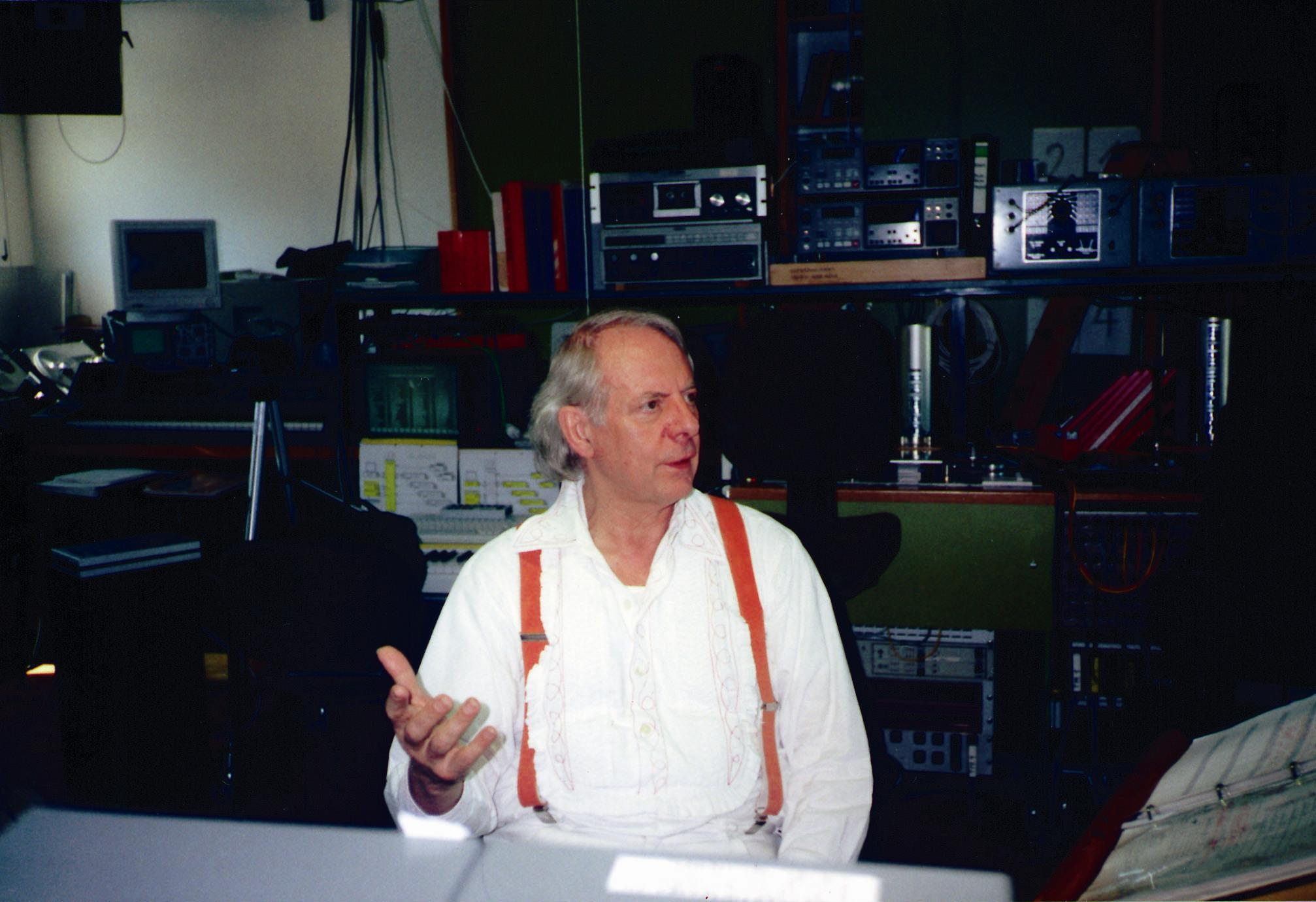
Karlheinz Stockhausen in 1996

Trumpetent is a quartet for four trumpets by the German composer Karlheinz Stockhausen, written in 1995. It is Number 73 in his catalogue of works and one of four independent compositions related to his opera, Mittwoch aus Licht. A performance lasts about 16 minutes.

== History ==
Trumpetent was written in October 1995 for Markus Stockhausen, Achim Gorsch, Andreas Adam, and Marco Blaauw, who gave the first performance on 31 May 1996 at the Philharmonic Hall in Cologne. The score is dedicated to these four performers, and to "all trumpeters who play in the spirit of Michael".

== Analysis ==
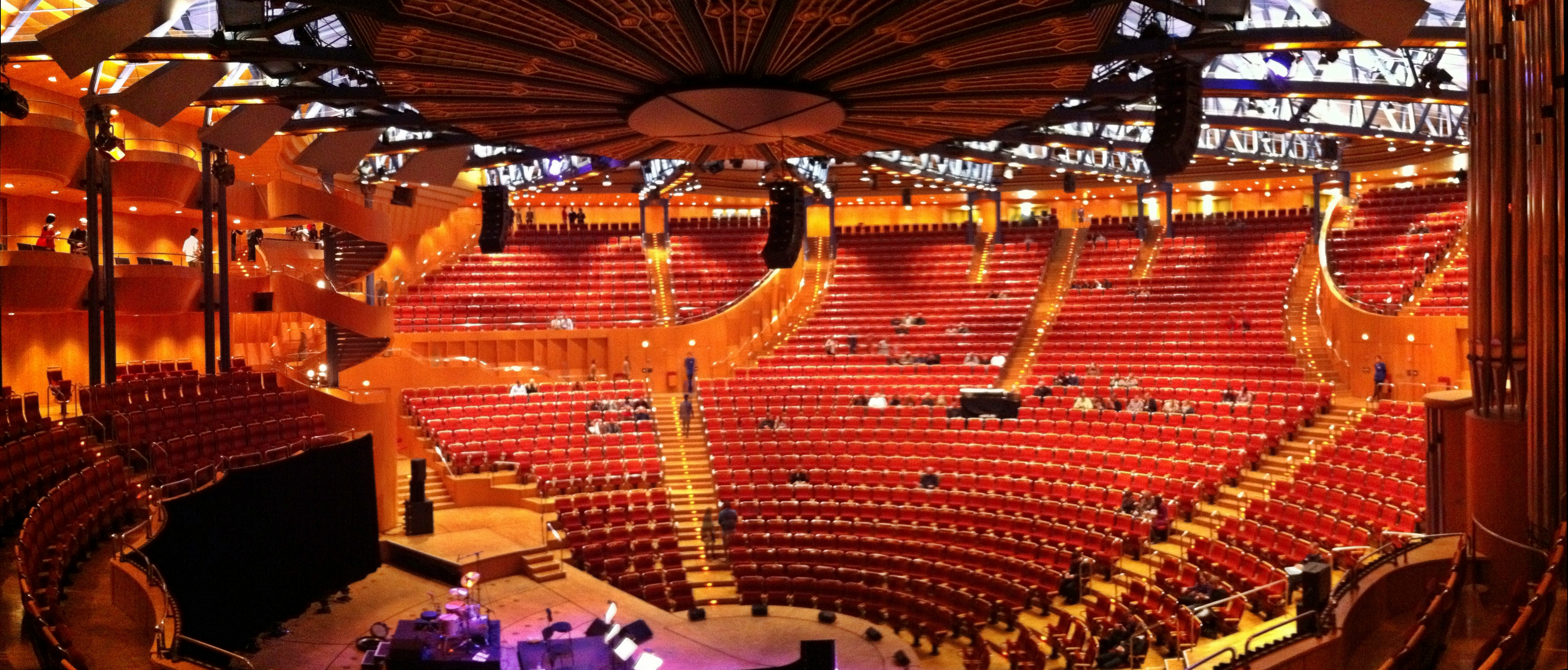
Philharmonic Hall in Cologne, the space in which Trumpetent was premiered

The work is based on the superformula for Mittwoch aus Licht, which is played at the end of Trumpetent in its simplest form from inside the tent, starting in bar 34. It is one of several independent works built in various ways from the Mittwoch superformula. The others are Europa-Gruss, Klavierstück XVIII, and Mittwoch Formel for percussion trio.

A white, pyramidal tent is set up on the stage at the front of the auditorium with two sides facing the audience. There are four round holes—two in each of the visible sides—a little larger than the bell of a trumpet cut in the walls of the tent. The composition falls into four sections, defined in part through the movement of the performers through and around the audience:

- Space I: The trumpets enter the hall calmly from the four cardinal directions and walk to the centre of the hall while playing sustained notes. They play a synchronous passage, and then continue back out of the hall to the opposite corners, still playing.
- Space II. The players re-enter from the four corners, this time striding anti-clockwise while playing a series of long trills with swelling dynamics, finally leaving the hall a second time at the four corners, playing all the while.
- Space III. The trumpeters re-enter, this time all from the rear, and march two-by-two down the aisle to the tent, circling behind and entering the tent, sticking the bells of the trumpets out of the four holes.
- In the Tent. The quartet play the formula synchronously one last time, slowly withdrawing the bells back into the tent.

The pitch structure consists of the three strands of the Wednesday formula (Lucifer formula beginning on A, Eve formula beginning on D, Michael formula beginning and ending on E), rotating among the four trumpets together with a fourth strand compositionally embellished from various parts of the formulas. Durations are serially disposed in sets of 7 + 5 + 6 minims (14 + 10 + 12 crotchets).

== Discography ==
- Michaels-Ruf, Bassetsu for basset horn, Synthi-Fou, Quitt, Komet for a percussionist, Trumpetent. Markus Stockhausen, Andreas Adam, Marco Blaauw, Achim Gorsch (trumpets), Suzanne Stephens (clarinet and basset horn), Stuart Gerber (percussion), Antonio Pérez-Abellán (synthesizer), Kathinka Pasveer (alto flute). Trumpetent recorded 20 October 1997 at the Feierabendhaus, Hürth-Knappsack. CD recording, 1 disc: 4¾ in., stereo. Stockhausen Complete Edition CD 82. Kürten: Stockhausen-Verlag, 2007.
