= Sonntag aus Licht =

- Opera by Karlheinz Stockhausen
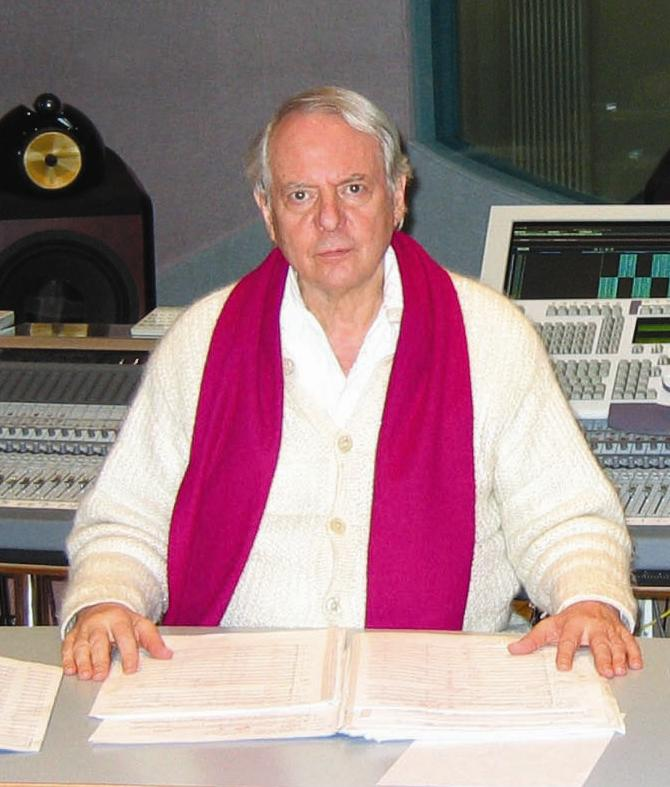
- Stockhausen on 7 March 2004 during the mix-down of Angel-Processions in Sound Studio N, Cologne
- Librettist: Stockhausen
- Language: German
- Premiere: April 9, 2011; Cologne Opera

Sonntag aus Licht (Sunday from Light) is an opera by Karlheinz Stockhausen in five scenes and a farewell, to a libretto written and compiled by the composer. It is the last-composed of seven operas that comprise the cycle Licht (Light). Its stage premiere in 2011 was posthumous, more than three years after the composer's death.

Within the Licht cycle, Sunday is the day of the mystical union of Eve and Michael, from which the new life of Monday proceeds. "In this way there is neither end nor beginning to the week. It is an eternal spiral".

== History ==
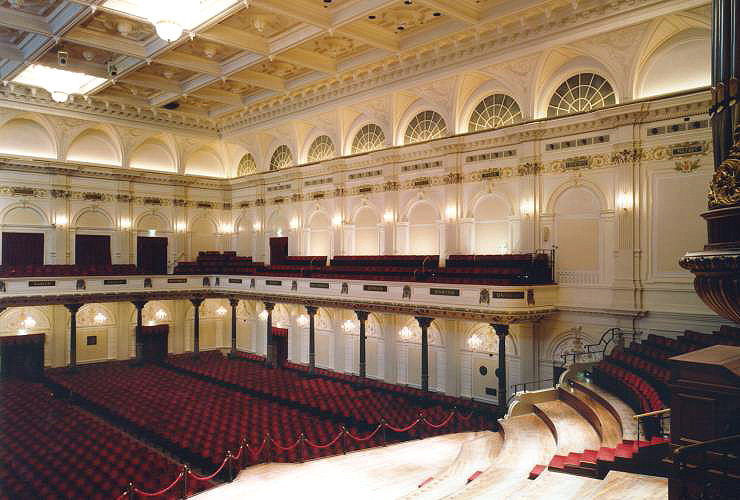
Interior of the Concertgebouw, Amsterdam, where Engel-Prozessionen was premiered on 9 November 2002

The various scenes of the opera were commissioned by different organizations and were premiered separately in concert form. Lichter—Wasser (Lights—Waters) was composed in 1998–99 on commission of the Südwestrundfunk for the Donaueschinger Musiktage, and was premiered on 16 October 1999 in the Baar Gymnasium in Donaueschingen. The second scene, Engel-Prozessionen (Angel Processions), was commissioned by the Groot Omroepkoor (Netherlands Radio Choir) of Hilversum, the Netherlands, and its artistic director Jan Zekveld. It was composed in 2000, and premiered on 9 November 2002 at the Concertgebouw in Amsterdam, with James Wood and David Lawrence conducting and with choreographer Machteld van Bronkhorst.

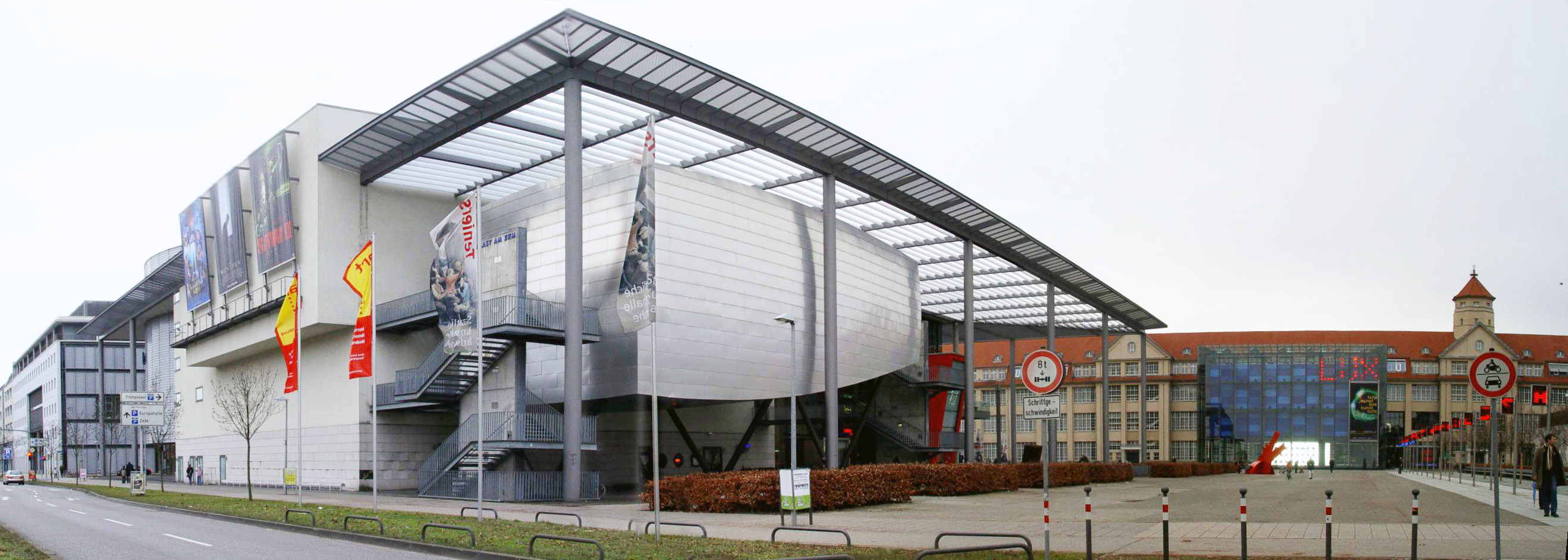
ZKM, Karlsruhe, where the first visual realisation of Licht-Bilder was made

The music of Licht-Bilder was commissioned by the Centre de Création Musicale Iannis Xenakis (CCMIX), Paris, and a visual realisation was commissioned by the Zentrum für Kunst und Mediatechnologie (ZKM), Karlsruhe, with the support of the Kunststiftung NRW (Art Foundation of North Rhine Westphalia). It was premiered at the Donaueschinger Musiktage, in the Donauhalle B, on 16 October 2004. The performers were Suzanne Stephens (bassett horn), Kathinka Pasveer (flute and alto flute), Hubert Mayer (tenor), Marco Blaauw (trumpet), and Antonio Pérez Abellán (synthesizer), with Karlheinz Stockhausen (sound projection). Image composition, stage design, and costumes were by Johannes Conen, with video collaboration from Yvonne Mohr.

Düfte-Zeichen was commissioned by Peter Ruzicka for the 2003 Salzburg Festival, and was composed between January and March 2002. It received its first performance on 29 August 2003 at the Perner Insel in Hallein (near Salzburg). The performers were Isolde Siebert (high soprano), Ksenja Lukič (soprano), Susanne Otto (alto), Hubert Mayer (tenor), Bernhard Gärtner (tenor), Jonathan de la Paz Zaens (baritone), Nicholas Isherwood (bass), Sebastian Kunz (boy soprano), and Antonio Pérez Abellán (synthesizer), with sound projection by the composer.

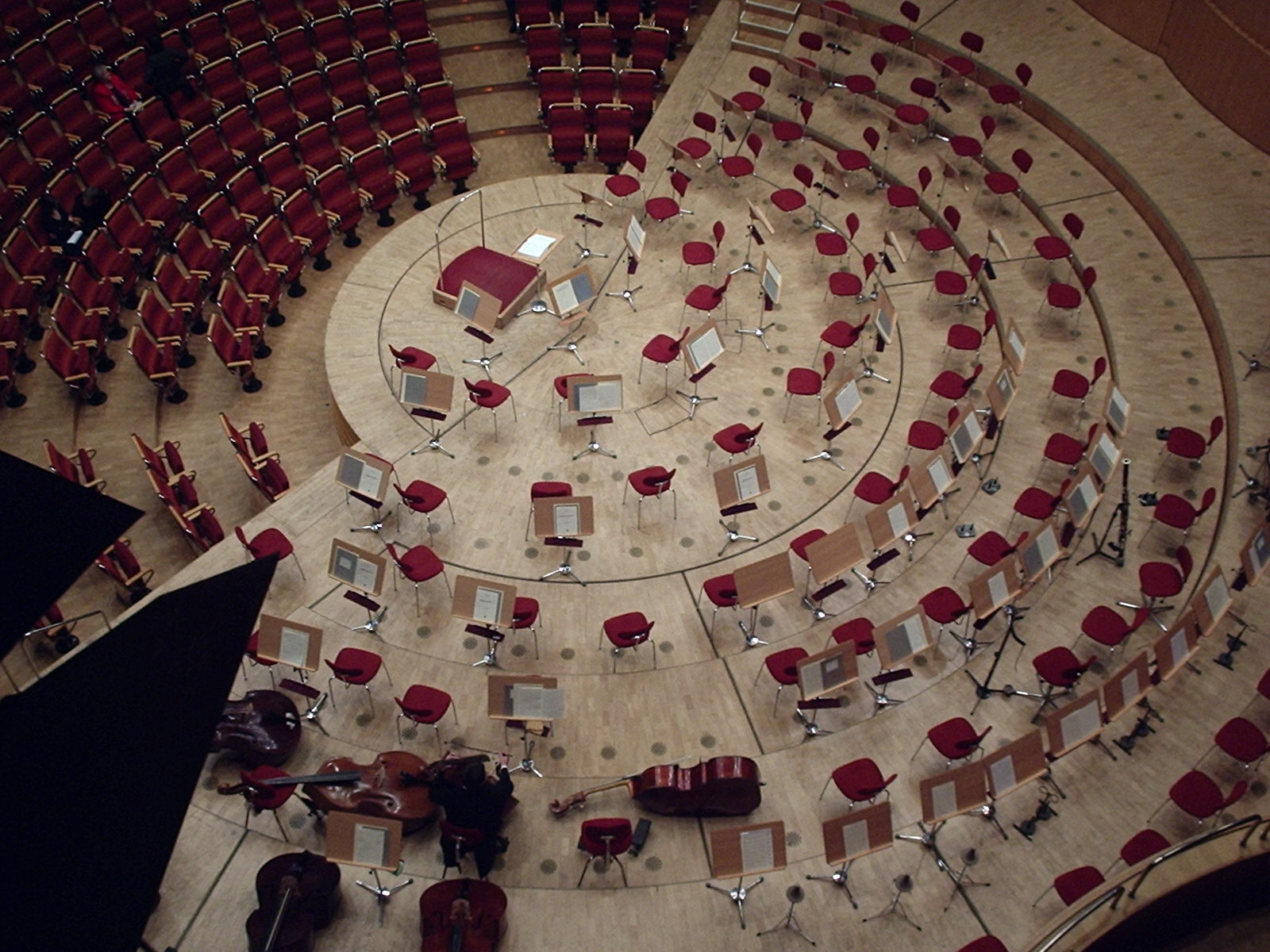
The Kölner Philharmonie, where the German premiere of Hoch-Zeiten für Orchester took place on 14 February 2003

The final pair of scenes, Hoch-Zeiten für Chor and Hoch-Zeiten für Orchester (High Times, or Marriages for choir and for orchestra), are performed simultaneously in two different halls. It was commissioned by Rafael Nebot for the Festival de Música de Canarias. It was premiered by the choir and symphony orchestra of the West German Radio Cologne, in the Sala Sinfónica and the Sala de Cámera of the Auditorio Alfredo Kraus in Las Palmas de Gran Canaria on 1 February 2003. Rupert Huber conducted the choir, Zsolt Nagy conducted the orchestra, and the synthesizer players were Antonio Pérez Abellán and Benjamin Kobler. The German premiere with the same forces took place in Cologne on 14 February 2003 at the Philharmonie and the Große Sendesaal of the WDR.

The last element to be completed was the Sonntags-Abschied (Sunday Farewell), which was adapted for five synthesizers in 2003 from Hoch-Zeiten für Chor. It was premiered on 1 August 2004 in the Sülztalhalle in Kürten as the second concert of the 2004 Stockhausen Courses. The performers were Frank Gutschmidt, Benjamin Kobler, Marc Maes, Antonio Pérez Abellán, and Fabrizio Rosso. In concert performances such as the premiere it may be performed live, but in the context of the opera it is intended to be heard in the foyer and/or outside the hall in five-channel playback, possibly with visual projections. There are also two further versions of this Abschied, one for solo percussionist and ten-channel tape titled Strahlen (Rays), the other as Klavierstück XIX, for synthesizer and five-channel tape. Work on the ten-channel electronic music for Strahlen was begun in 2003 by the ZKM, Karlsruhe, but was interrupted in 2004 in favour of producing the visual elements for Licht-Bilder. The tape part was not finished until 2010, though a preliminary version was used for the world premiere on 4 December 2009 in Karlsruhe, with László Hudacsek, vibraphone.

A further component scene, to be performed simultaneously with the rest of the opera but in a separate location, was planned but never composed. This was to have been called Luciferium, in which Lucifer is banished from the opera, and instead "is in the jail (Luciferium). But he listens".Solare and Stockhausen 2003

The staged premiere of Sonntag was given by the Cologne Opera in two parts, on Saturday and Sunday, 9 and 10 April 2011, in the Staatenhaus (States' House) of the Kölner Messe. Subsequent performances were given on 20/21, 26/27, and 28/29 April, with the entire opera given in a single day on 24 April and 1 May 2011. The musical direction was by Kathinka Pasveer and Peter Rundel, and the artistic concept by Franc Aleu (from Urano), and by Roland Olbeter and Carlus Padrissa (from La Fura dels Baus). The staging was by Carlus Padrissa, with dramaturgy by Thomas Ulrich. Stage design was by Roland Olbeter, costumes by Chu Uroz, and lighting by Andreas Grüter. Video production was by Franc Aleu and choreography by Athol Farmer and Carlos Paz.

The production left a budget deficit for the Cologne Opera that, when combined with a decrease in municipal funding, led to director Uwe Erik Laufenberg's resignation.

== Roles ==
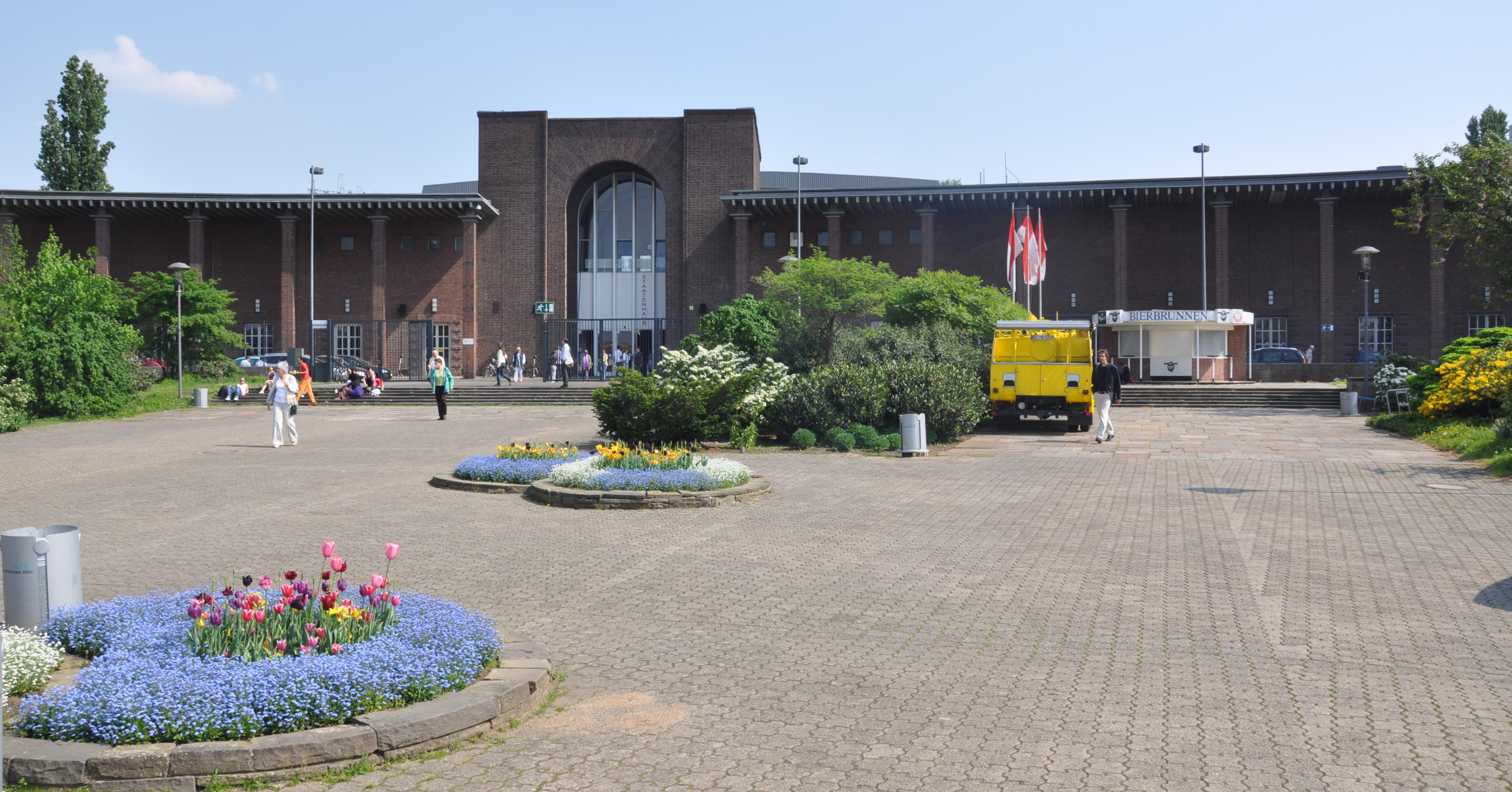
Main entrance of the Staatenhaus at the Kölner Messe, during an interval of the performance of Sonntag aus Licht on Sunday, 24 April 2011

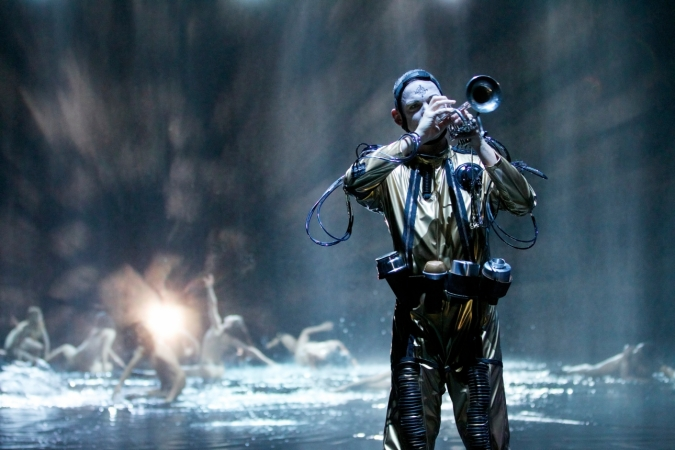
Marco Blaauw in Sonntag

Role	Performer	Premiere cast (April 2011)
Scene 1: Lichter—Wasser (Sonntags-Gruß)
Eve	soprano	Anna Palimina
Michael	tenor	Hubert Mayer
	synthesizer	Ulrich Löffler
	sound projection	Paul Jeukendrup
	orchestra	musikFabrik, cond. Peter Rundel
Scene 2: Engel-Prozessionen
Angel Choir 7 (Eve)	high soprano	Csilla Csövári
Angel Choir 7	alto	Noa Frenkel
Angel Choir 7 (Michael)	tenor	Alexander Mayr
Angel Choir 7	bass	Michael Leibundgut
Angel Choirs 1–6	six choirs & tutti choir	Cappella Amsterdam, Estonian Philharmonic Chamber Choir; Cologne Opera choir ("Tutti Choir"), cond. James Wood
Scene 3: Licht-Bilder
(Michael)	tenor	Hubert Mayer
(Michael)	trumpet	Marco Blaauw
(Eve)	flute	Chloé L'Abbé
(Eve)	basset horn	Fie Schouten
	synthesizer	Benjamin Kobler
	sound projection	Kathinka Pasveer
Scene 4: Düfte-Zeichen
(Eve)	high soprano	Csilla Csövári
(Eve)	soprano	Maike Raschke
(Michael)	high tenor	Alexander Mayr
(Michael)	tenor	Hubert Mayer
(Lucifer)	baritone	Jonathan de la Paz Zaens
(Lucifer)	bass	Michael Leibundgut
Eve	contralto	Noa Frenkel
Michael	boy soprano	Leonard Aurische (soloist of the Choir Academy Dortmund, dir, Jost Salm)
	synthesizer	Benjamin Kobler
	sound projection	Kathinka Pasveer
Scene 5: Hoch-Zeiten für Chor
	five choir groups	WDR choir, Cologne, cond. Rupert Huber (5-track tape projection)
	sound projection	Kathinka Pasveer
Scene 5: Hoch-Zeiten fur Orchester
	five orchestra groups	musikFabrik, cond. Mariano Chiacchiarini, Norbert Krämer, Thomas Meixner, Dirk Rothbrust, and Rie Watanabe
	sound projection	Paul Jeukendrup
Sonntags-Abschied (5-track tape projection)
	synthesizers I to V	Marc Maes, Frank Gutschmidt, Fabrizio Rosso, Benjamin Kobler, Antonio Pérez Abellán
	sound projection	Kathinka Pasveer

== Synopsis ==
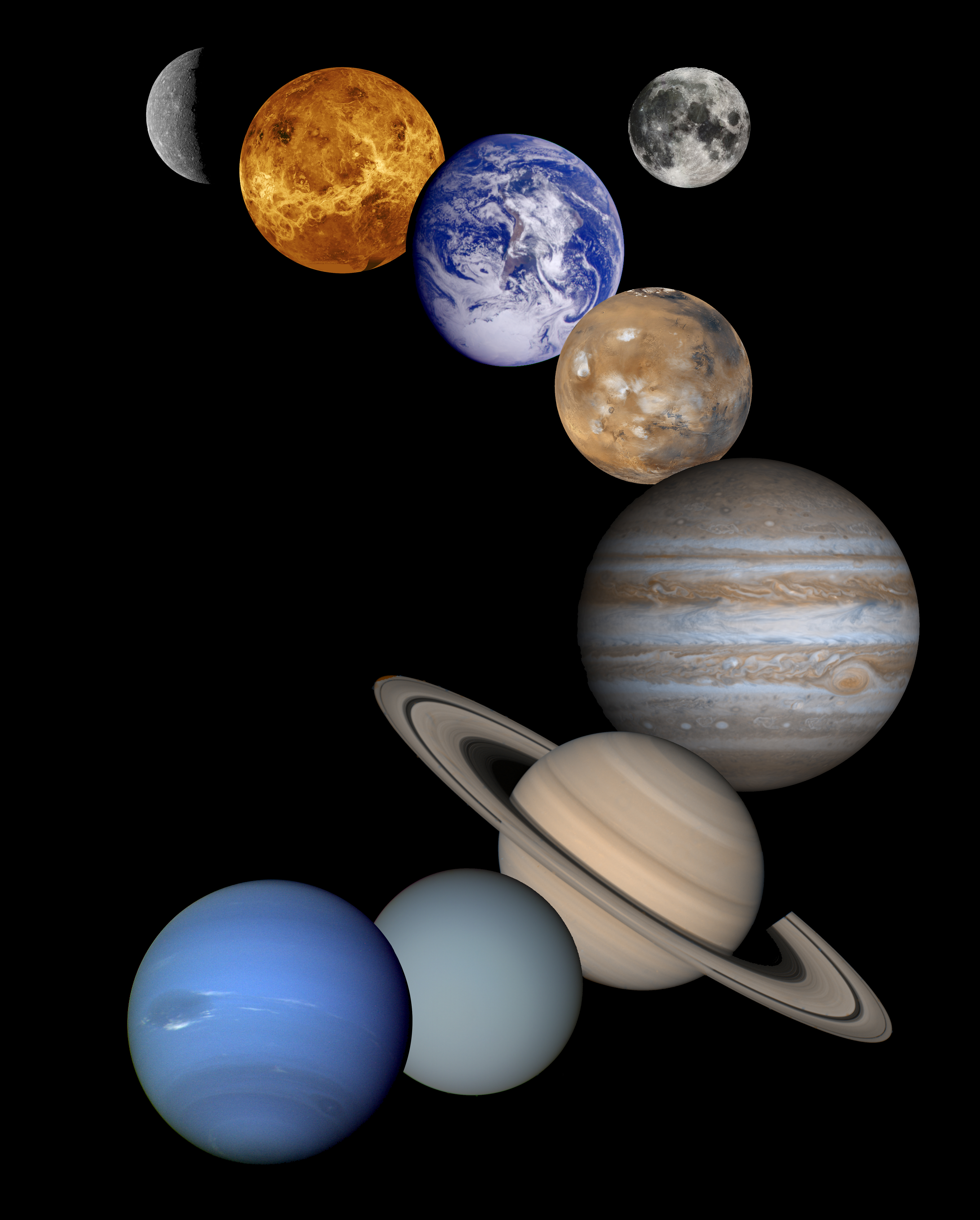
Planets of the Solar System

Sonntag takes as its subject the Solar System and the relationships of all the planets that orbit the Sun. In this opera, the Earth and life on it is represented as the result of the union of light and water. These two elements are presented in the first scene, and the rest of the opera celebrates the evolution of life, of plants, animals, humans, and above all this the planets, moons, and heavenly constellations. The opera has a pronounced ritualistic and meditative character, with very little that can be described as dramatic action. There are five scenes (or six, counting the two versions of Hoch-Zeiten separately), and a concluding "farewell". Most of the scenes include elaborate spatial movement, each with "a distinctive spatial imprint".

=== Scene 1: Lichter—Wasser (Sunday Greeting) ===
Lichter—Wasser (Lights—Waters) is both the first scene and the "Gruss" (greeting) of the opera. An initial duet by the soprano (Eve) and tenor (Michael) is followed by the entrance of the orchestra, who take their places throughout the audience, which is arranged in triangular segments facing the centre. Each musician is provided with a rack with a lamp and a glass of water. Seventeen high-register instruments are identified by seventeen blue lamps, corresponding to the Michael formula, and twelve lower-register instruments are lit by green lamps, corresponding to the Eve formula. The music rotates through the space in two simultaneous layers and in 12 successive waves. These rotations are related to the planets and moons of the Solar System, whose names, astronomical characteristics, and symbolisms form a part of the sung texts, which were written by the composer. At the end, the musicians make their exit and the soprano and tenor sing a closing duet.

=== Scene 2: Engel-Prozessionen ===
In the second scene, Engel-Prozessionen (Angel Processions), seven groups of angels move through the space singing God's praises in seven languages (Ulrich 2011, 3). The seventh group consists of four soloists, and are the Angels of Joy (Sunday Angels). They sing in German. The soprano and tenor soloists should either be the same as in scene 1, or strongly resemble them. The other six choirs are Angels of Water (Monday Angels), Angels of Earth (Tuesday Angels), Angels of Life (Wednesday Angels), Angels of Music (Thursday Angels), Angels of Light (Friday Angels), and Angels of Heaven (Saturday Angels), and sing in Hindi, Chinese, Spanish, English, Arabic, and Swahili, respectively. The texts were all written by the composer in German, and translated into the respective languages. In Lichter—Wasser the composed movement of sounds in the hall is only apparent, with musicians remaining at stationary positions, but in Engel-Prozessionen spatial movement is real, with the singers physically moving through the performance area.

=== Scene 3: Licht-Bilder ===
The scene Licht-Bilder is performed by two pairs of musicians, a flute and basset horn on the one hand, and a tenor and trumpet on the other. The tenor (Michael) sings the praises of God in the form of His creations, manifested from stones to spirits. The music is accompanied by corresponding light images, hence the title of the scene. The flute and basset horn represent Eve, while the tenor and trumpet represent Michael, and each pair always sound together. Although the musical material is all drawn from the Michael and Eve layers of the Licht superformula, the assignment of these melodies to the pairs changes from section to section. The musical figures given to the basset horn and flute on the one hand, and to the tenor and trumpet on the other, are gradually displaced and then brought together again seven times, forming large phases corresponding to the days of the week. At the same time, movements of the performers on the stage corresponding to the musical figures are composed, and the waves are mirrored by a double ring modulation, creating new harmonies and timbres.

=== Scene 4: Düfte-Zeichen ===
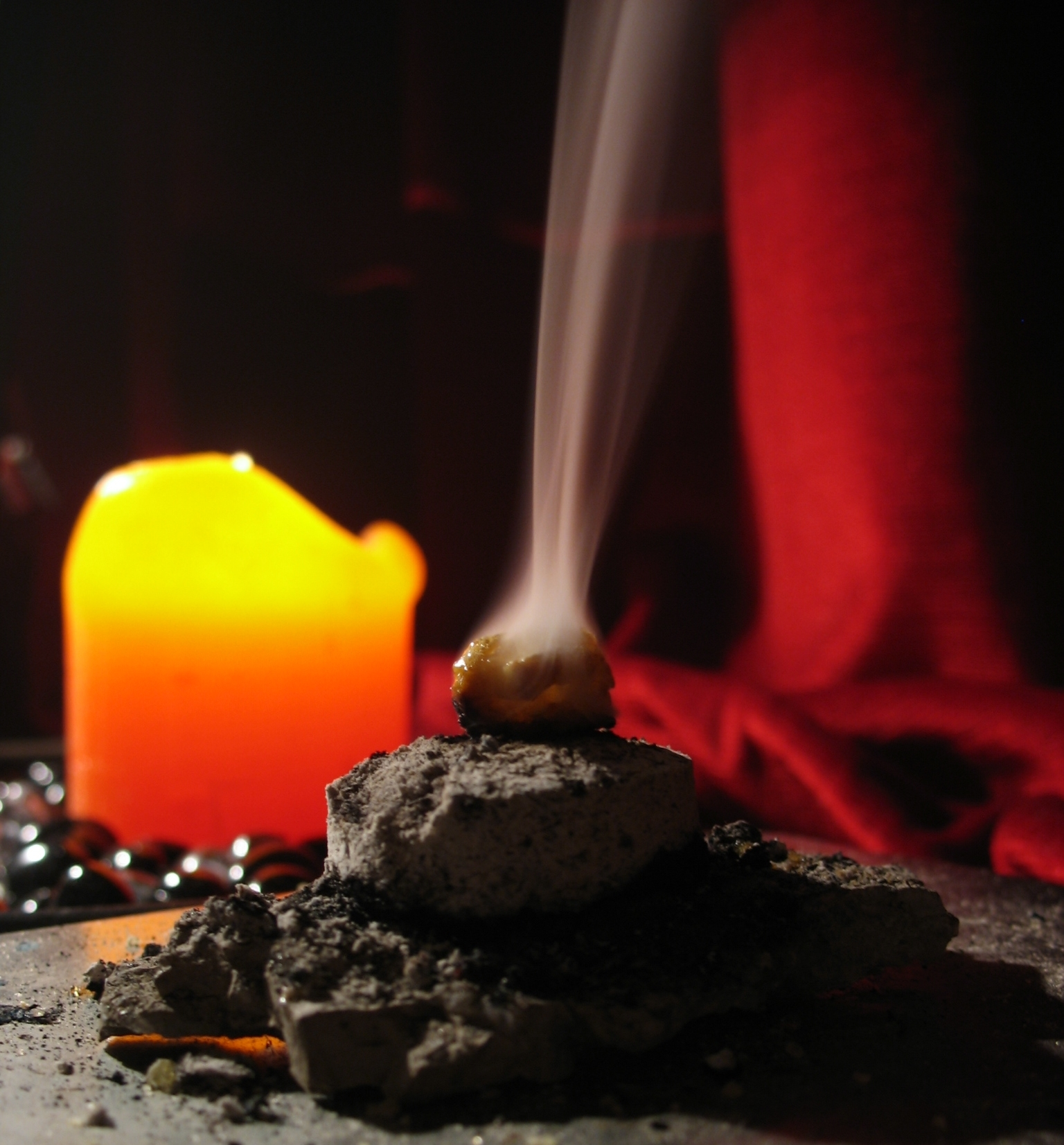
Frankincense is the Sunday scent

The fourth scene recapitulates the seven days of the entire Licht cycle. The protagonists explain each day in terms of their characteristic signs and scents. Afterward, Eve appears as Earth Mother (sung by an alto), and Michael appears in the form of a boy soprano. The seven fragrances chosen for the days of the week, their associated geographical areas, and the seven voices and voice combinations are:

1. Monday: Cúchulainn (Ireland), solo for high soprano
2. Tuesday: Kyphi (Egypt), duet for tenor and bass
3. Wednesday: Mastic (Greece), trio for soprano, tenor, and baritone
4. Thursday: Rosa Mystica (Italy/Germany), solo for high tenor
5. Friday: Tate Yunanaka (Mexico), duet for soprano and baritone
6. Saturday: Ud (India), solo for bass
7. Sunday: Frankincense (Africa), duet for high soprano and high tenor

An alto voice from outside the hall, identifying herself as Eve, causes the soloists to run out, in turbulence. They return in procession, escorting the alto to the front while singing an "overtone chant." The alto Eve calls the boy Michael to her out of the audience, they sing a mystical duet, and she takes him with her into another world.

=== Scene 5: Hoch-Zeiten for Choir and for Orchestra ===
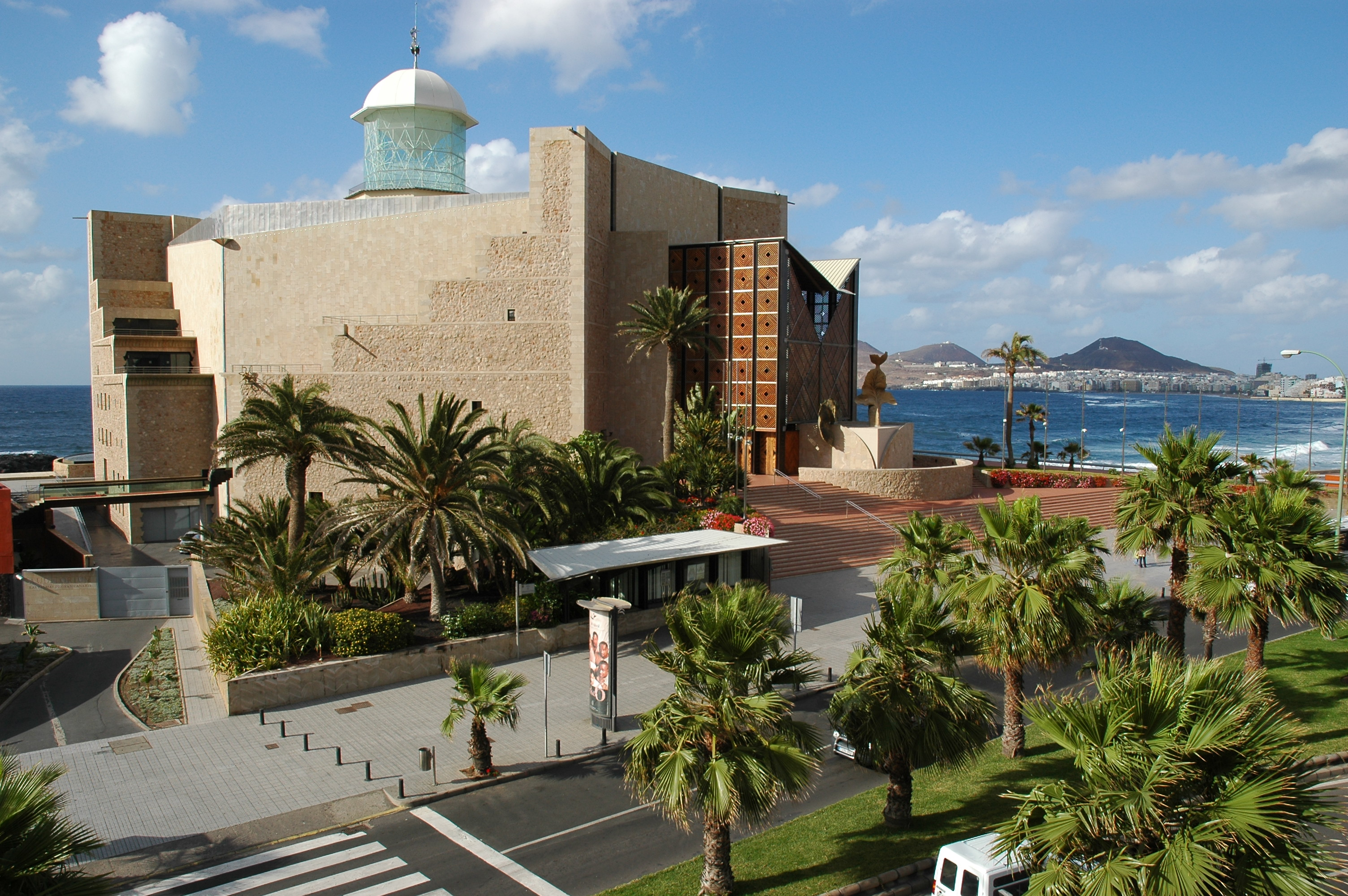
Auditorio Alfredo Kraus, Las Palmas, Gran Canaria, where Hoch-Zeiten received its world premiere on 1 February 2003

Hoch-Zeiten (High Times, or Marriages) is performed simultaneously in two different halls by five choral groups and five orchestral sections, respectively. The five divisions in each hall perform at independent speeds, producing "a tour de force of multiple superimposed tempi". The performance is then repeated, with the audiences changing halls. As such, these two versions are sometimes regarded as both the fifth and sixth scenes of Sonntag. The basic structure of the orchestral version is identical to that of Hoch-Zeiten for Choir, but has added to it five duos and two trios performed by the first-desk players of the orchestra. These ensembles are recollections of characteristic moments from each of the seven operas in the Licht cycle, presented not in weekday order but in the order they were composed:

1. Thursday duo, for trumpet and clarinet, quoting from Mondeva, act 1, scene 2 of Donnerstag
2. Saturday duo, for flute and trombone, quoting from Kathinkas Gesang, scene 2 of Samstag
3. Monday duo, for viola and cello, quoting from Wochenkreis, the second "situation" of act 2, scene 3 (Evas Lied) of Montag
4. Tuesday duo, for flugelhorn and trombone, quoting from Pietà, in act 2 of Dienstag
5. Friday duo, for oboe and bassoon, quoting from Elufa, the ninth "real scene" of Freitag
6. Wednesday trio, for clarinet, violin, and cello, quoting from the "Carousel" section of Michaelion, scene 4 of Mittwoch
7. Finally, a Sunday trio for flute, viola, and synthesizer, quoting the opening of Lichter—Wasser, the first scene of Sonntag.

=== Sonntags-Abschied ===
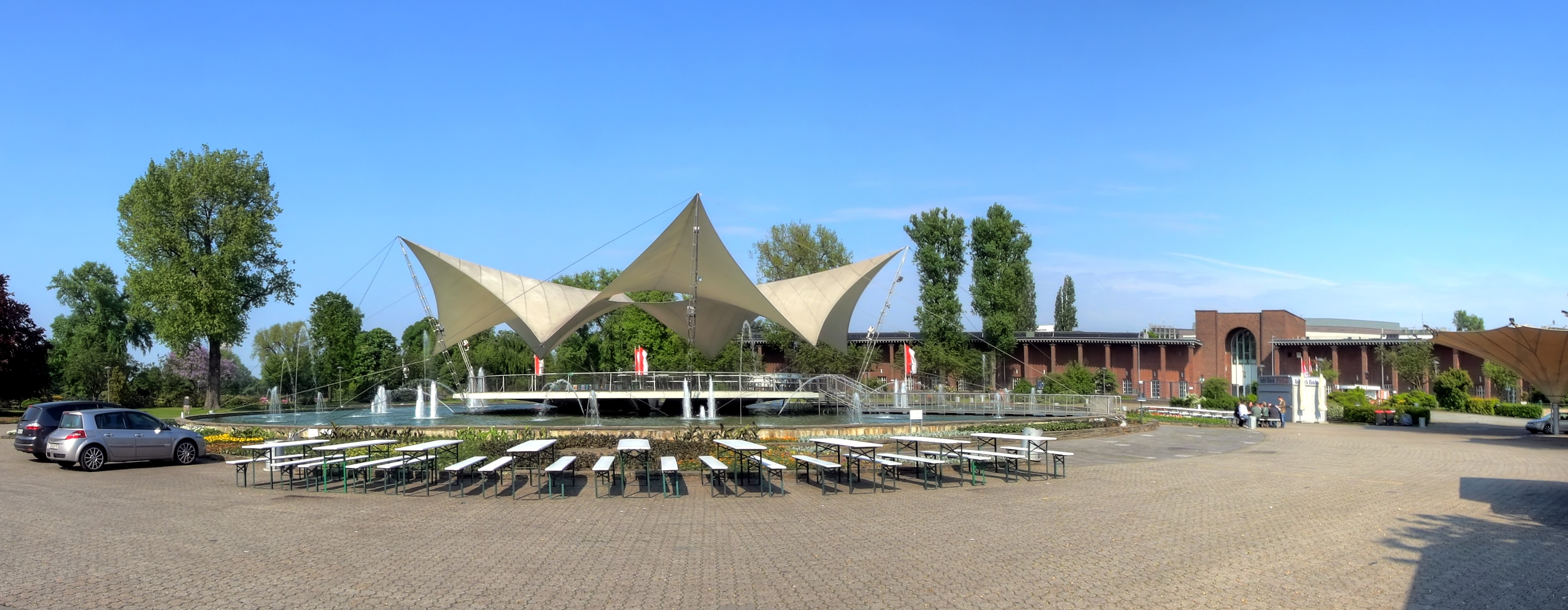
The Sonntags-Abschied was played outside the Staatenhaus (background) as the audience departed past the Tanzbrunnen (photographed in 2010)

The Sunday Farewell is essentially Hoch-Zeiten for choir played by five synthesizers, including the phonetic notation of the original vocal texts. It is not so much an arrangement as an adaptation, and is intended for five-channel playback in recorded form in the foyer and outdoors as the audience exits the theatre.

== Discography ==
Like all of the other complete recordings of the Licht operas in the Stockhausen Complete Edition, the one of Sonntag aus Licht is a composite one, though (unlike five others) it has not been released as a boxed set, but rather on six separate CDs. This was broadcast by SWR in September 2007. The recordings actually date from 1999, 2002, 2003, and 2004, and were made in various venues, as detailed below.

- Scene 1: Lichter—Wasser (Sonntags-Gruss). Barbara van den Boom (soprano), Hubert Mayer (tenor), Antonio Pérez Abellán (synthesizer), SWR-Sinfonieorchester Baden-Baden/Freiburg, Karlheinz Stockhausen (cond.). CD 58 (single CD), recorded in Donaueschingen in 1999 [52 mins. 07 secs.]. Kürten: Stockhausen-Verlag, 2000.
- Scene 2: Engel-Prozessionen and Pianissimo Choir Tutti of Engel-Prozessionen. Isolde Siebert (soprano), Janet Collins (alto), Hubert Mayer (tenor), Andreas Fischer (bass), Groot Omroepkoor (Netherlands Radio Choir), James Wood and David Lawrence (cond.), Karlheinz Stockhausen (musical supervision and sound projection). CD 67 A-B (2CDs), recorded in Amsterdam in 2002 [41 mins. + 41 mins.]. Kürten: Stockhausen-Verlag, 2004.
- Scene 3: Licht-Bilder. Hubert Mayer (tenor), Kathinka Pasveer (flute with ring modulation), Suzanne Stephens (basset horn), Marco Blaauw (trumpet with ring modulation), Antonio Pérez Abellán (synthesizer), Karlheinz Stockhausen (sound Projection). Two versions, one without ring-modulation for study purposes. CD 68 A-B (2CDs), recorded in Donaueschingen in 2004 [43 mins. + 43 mins.]. Kürten: Stockhausen-Verlag, 2005.
- Scene 4: Düfte-Zeichen. Isolde Siebert (high soprano), Ksenija Lukic (soprano), Susanne Otto (alto), Hubert Mayer (high tenor), Bernhard Gärtner (tenor), Jonathan de la Paz Zaens (baritone), Nicholas Isherwood (bass), Sebastian Kunz (boy's voice), Antonio Pérez Abellán (synthesizer), Karlheinz Stockhausen (musical direction and sound projection) CD 69 (single CD), recorded in Salzburg in 2003. Kürten: Stockhausen-Verlag, 2004.
  - 9 Düfte Der Woche aus Düfte Zeichen vom Sonntag aus LICHT (separate versions of the sub-scenes). Isolde Siebert (high soprano), Ksenija Lukic (soprano), Susanne Otto (alto), Hubert Mayer (high tenor), Bernhard Gärtner (tenor), Jonathan de la Paz Zaens (baritone), Nicholas Isherwood (bass), Sebastian Kunz (boy's voice), Antonio Pérez Abellán (synthesizer), Karlheinz Stockhausen (musical direction and sound projection) CD 70 (single CD)
- Scene 5: Hoch-Zeiten für Orchester, Hoch-Zeiten für Chor. WDR Sinfonieorchester, Zsolt Nagy and five assistant conductors (conds.); WDR Rundfunkchor, Rupert Huber and five conducting choir members (cond..); Antonio Pérez Abellán (synthesizer), Karlheinz Stockhausen (sound projection and musical direction). CD 73 (single CD). [74 mins.]. Kürten: Stockhausen-Verlag, 2004.
  - Hoch-Zeiten für Chor vom Sonntag aus Licht: 5 einzelne Gruppen und Tutti zum Studium. WDR Rundfunkchor, Rupert Huber and five conducting choir members (conds.). CD 71 A–C (3CDs), recorded in Cologne in 2003. Kürten: Stockhausen-Verlag, 2004.
  - Hoch-Zeiten für Orchester vom Sonntag aus Licht: 5 einzelne Gruppen und Tutti zum Studium (study material). WDR Sinfonieorchester, Zsolt Nagy, Valerio Sannicandro, and Wolfgang Lischke (conductors) CD 72 A–C (3CDs), recorded in Cologne in 2003. Kürten: Stockhausen-Verlag, 2004.
- Farewell: Sonntags-Abschied and click tracks from Sonntags Abschied. Marc Maes, Frank Gutschmidt, Fabrizio Rosso, Benjamin Kobler, and Antonio Pérez Abellán (synthesizers), Karlheinz Stockhausen (sound projection). CD 74 (single CD), recorded in Kürten in 2004 [35 mins. + 34 mins. 30 secs.]. Kürten: Stockhausen-Verlag, 2005.
