= Lischke (surname) =

Lischke is a surname. Notable people with the surname include:

- Karl Emil Lischke (1819–1886), German lawyer, politician, diplomat, best known as amateur naturalist
- Mike Lischke, developer of GLScene
- Wolfgang Lischke, German football player and coach
