= Europa-Gruss =

Composition by Karlheinz Stockhausen

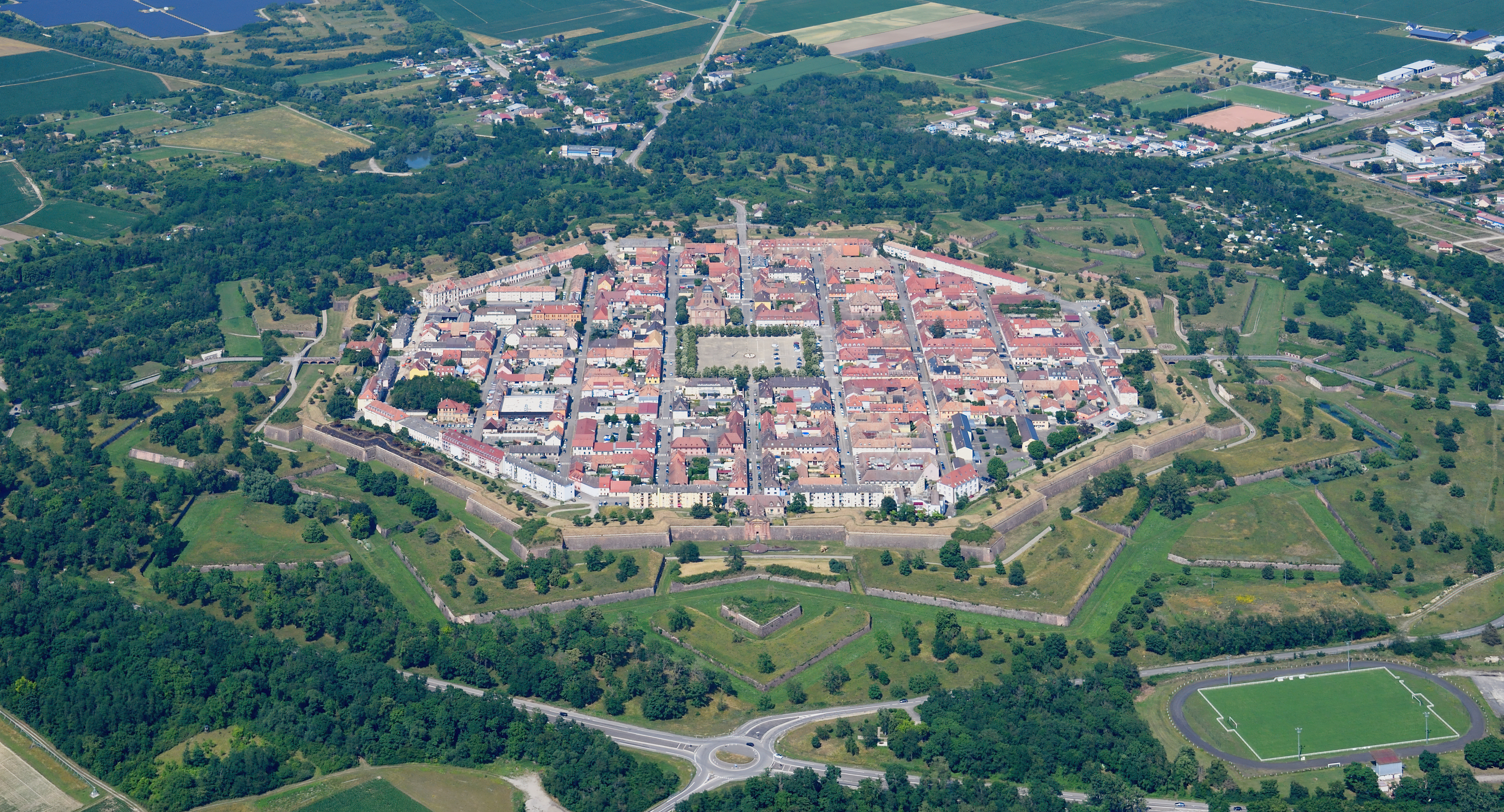
Neuf-Brisach, site of the world premiere of the Europa-Gruss

Europa-Gruss (Europe Greeting) is a composition by Karlheinz Stockhausen for wind ensemble with optional synthesizers, and is assigned Number 72 in the composer's catalogue of works. It has a duration of about twelve-and-a-half minutes.

== History ==
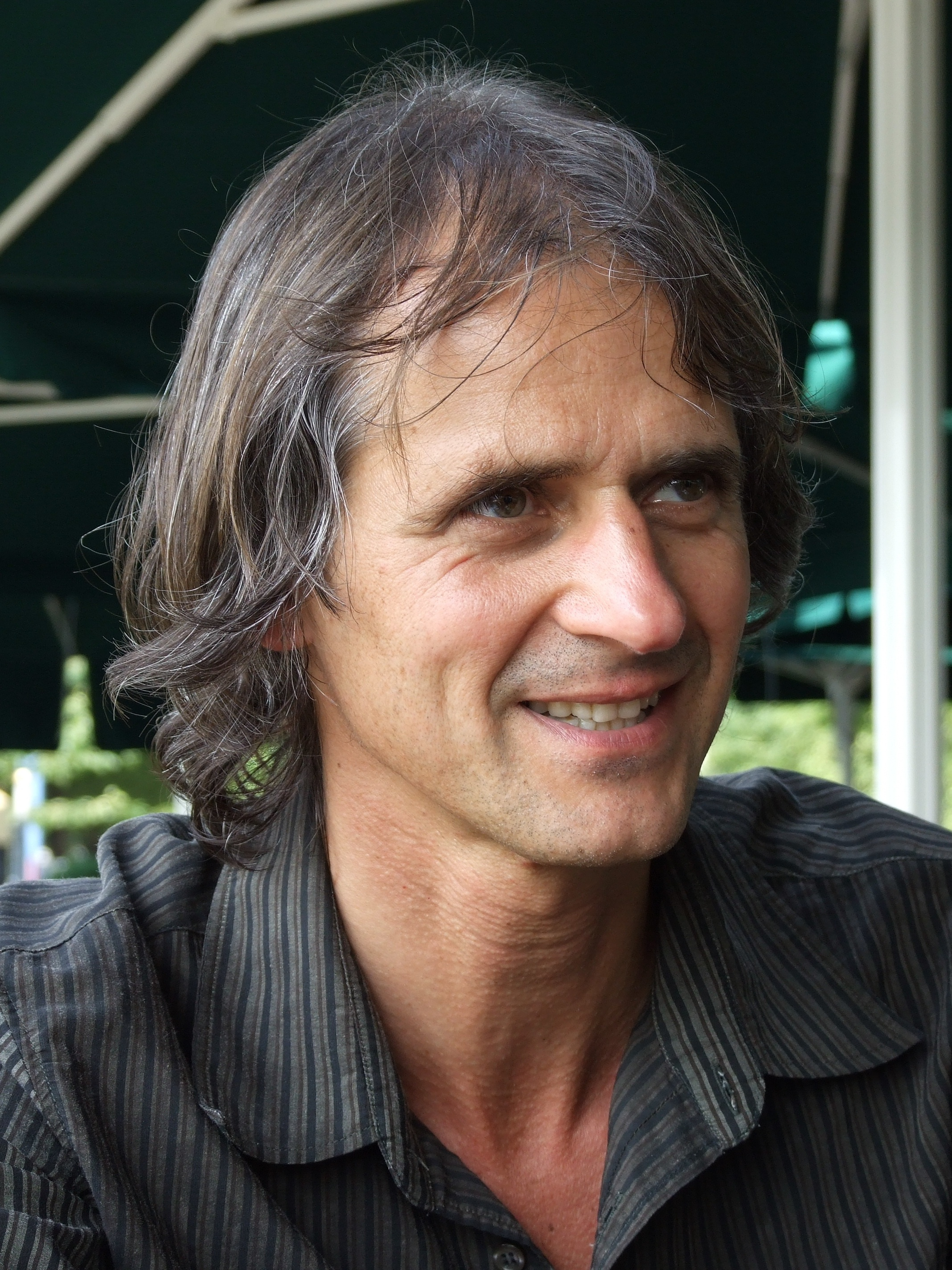
Markus Stockhausen, director of the world premiere

The idea of composing the Europa-Gruss was first suggested to Stockhausen in August 1991, by the sculptor Helmut Lutz of Breisach. In February of the next year, it was formally commissioned by the mayor of Neuf-Brisach (Breisach’s adjacent French fortress city across the Rhine in Alsace), for the Étoile Sonore Europe Festival, who requested a "Europe Fanfare" or "concerted Europe hymn". Originally titled Mittwochs-Gruss, it was briefly meant to be the "greeting" for the opera Mittwoch aus Licht and was initially assigned the work number 65 in the composer’s catalogue of works, immediately preceding the four scenes of the opera (provisionally numbered 66–69). By the time the score was completed on 21 July 1992, Stockhausen had decided against using it in his opera and changed its title, first to Europa-Hymne, and then to its final, published form. In December 1994 Stockhausen re-assigned it the work number 72 (along with other adjustments to the work numbers), and eventually replaced it in the opera with a new “greeting” of electronic music, which took over the number 65.

Flexibly scored for a potentially immense ensemble of instruments, it was premièred on 12 September 1992 in Neuf-Brisach by an ensemble of the participants in a regional brass convention featuring eight solo trumpets, directed by the composer’s son, Markus Stockhausen, who also participated as a trumpet soloist. The composer revised the score in 1995, and in 2002 devised a minimum scoring for just ten instruments. This version was premiered on 27 July 2002 at the Stockhausen Courses for New Music in Kürten, under the composer’s direction, and recorded shortly afterward by the same performers for release on compact disc.

== Instrumentation ==
The instrumentation suggested in the commission was: eight solo trumpeters, one extra soloist, 104 trumpets divided into four equal sections, 32 horns divided into four sections, 32 mixed tenor and baritone horns in four sections, 64 trombones in four sections, and 8 tubas in two sections. Stockhausen accommodated this request with a flexible scoring for four tutti groups of instruments (two of treble and two of bass instruments), a group of solo instruments, and synthesizers ad lib. There is no upper limit on the size of this ensemble, but the groups should be balanced in size. The smallest possible option is for twelve parts: four soloists, four tutti treble and four tutti bass instruments (divided 2 + 2), but when synthesizers are included, each player can cover two parts (one with each hand). The arrangement used for the 2002 performance with just ten players (two flutes, clarinet, basset horn, bass clarinet, soprano saxophone, trumpet, trombone, and two synthesizers) is printed in the score, immediately after the original version.

== Analysis ==
The Europa-Gruss is an example of formula composition, using the Licht superformula. It is based on a synchronisation of the core pitches of the complete Michael and Lucifer layers (in the middle and lower parts, respectively) to the Wednesday segment of Eve’s layer (in the highest parts). These are stretched twenty-fold, from an original duration of just 36 seconds to 12 minutes, 14 seconds, and rapid solo passages are composed around the three stretched melodies. A sixty-second pause occurs about a third of the way through the work (due to a rest in Eve’s Wednesday segment), where isolated punctual notes and chords recall elements of the preceding section.

== Discography ==
- Stockhausen, Karlheinz. Europa-Gruss; Stop und Start; Two Couples; Elektronische und Konkrete Musik zu Komet; Licht-Ruf. First work: Kathinka Pasveer and Karin de Fleyt (flutes), Suzanne Stephens (clarinet), Michele Marelli (basset horn), Rumi Sota-Klemm (bass clarinet). Julien Petit (soprano saxophone), William Forman (trumpet), Andrew Digby (trombone), Marc Maes and Antonio Pérez Abellán (synthesizers), Karlheinz Stockhausen (direction and sound projection). Second work: the same performers, without Pasveer and Stephens, plus Michael Patmann (percussion), Frank Gutschmidt, Benjamin Kobler, and Josef Rebber (synthesizers). First two works recorded 6 August 2002 and 5 August 2002, respectively, at Sound Studio N, Cologne. CD recording, 1 disc: digital, 12 cm., stereo. Stockhausen Complete Edition CD 64. Kürten: Stockhausen-Verlag, 2002.
