= Wolfgang Lischke =

German footballer and coach

Personal information
- Date of birth: 4 June 1929 (age 97)
- Place of birth: Essen

Wolfgang Lischke (born 4 July 1947) is a German football player and coach.

During 1969–1980 he played in clubs of DDR-Oberliga ("GDR Premier League"). After the reunification of Germany he was coach for SG LVB (de:Sportgemeinschaft Leipziger Verkehrsbetriebe).

== Playing career ==
- 07/1968–06/1969 : BSG Chemie Zeitz
- 1969–1972: BSG Stahl Riesa
- 1972–1973: SG Dynamo Dresden
- 1973–1980: BSG Chemie Leipzig
- 07/1982–06/1984: TSG Chemie Markkleeberg

== Coaching and managerial career ==
- 07/2009–06/2010 Blau-Weiß Großlehna
- 06/2008–03/2009 SG Rotation Leipzig
- 07/2007–06/2008 SG LVB Leipzig
