= Choral (Stockhausen) =

Musical composition by Karlheinz Stockhausen

- Choral music by Karlheinz Stockhausen
- Catalogue: 1/9
- Text: poem by Stockhausen
- Language: German
- Composed: 1950
- Dedication: Doris Andreae
- Performed: 1950
- Published: 1971
- Scoring: choir a cappella

"Choral" (Chorale) is a short a cappella choral composition by Karlheinz Stockhausen, who wrote both the words and music in 1950. It was later given the number ^{1}/_{9} in the composer's catalogue of works and lasts about four minutes in performance. The score is dedicated to the composer's first wife, Doris Stockhausen, née Andreae.

== History ==
During his third year of music-education studies at the Cologne Conservatory, free stylistic exercises in composition were part of the programme of training. His teacher was Hermann Schroeder. Along with fugues, chorale preludes, sonatas, and song arrangements in various traditional styles, and a scherzo in the style of Paul Hindemith, Stockhausen wrote a number of choral pieces for the school choir in which he himself sang: The "Madrigalchor der Kölner Musikhochschule" was conducted by Schroeder, and the first performance took place in a recording for Cologne Conservatory, Cologne (WDR) in 1950. Amongst them was "Choral", with a text written by Stockhausen beginning "Wer uns trug mit Schmerzen in dies Leben" (Who has borne us with pain in this life). Stockhausen, who had not considered himself a composer up to this point, decided shortly after finishing this and the Chöre für Doris to attempt something a little more ambitious for the first time, and wrote the Drei Lieder for alto voice and chamber orchestra.

All of these student works and a number of later ones remained unpublished until 1971, when Stockhausen rediscovered his early work Formel for chamber orchestra, and noticed affinities with his then-just-completed Mantra for two pianos and electronics. When Maurice Fleuret asked for a new piece to be performed at the Journées de Musique Contemporaine, Stockhausen offered Formel, and filled out the programme with a selection of other early compositions, including the Drei Lieder and the Sonatine for violin and piano. On this same programme, on 21 October 1971 at the Théâtre de la Ville in Paris, Marcel Couraud's chamber choir sang the Chöre für Doris for the first time, together with the contemporaneous "Choral".

== Analysis ==
The text, beginning with the words "Wer uns trug mit Schmerzen in dies Leben" (Who has born us in pain into this life), was written by the composer himself. The form is modeled on that of the Verlaine text Stockhausen previously used in "Armer junger Hirt", the second movement of Chöre für Doris: two five-line stanzas with the scansion of the Agnus Dei, in each of which the fifth line repeats the first.

The soprano melody presents a twelve-tone row with a return to the starting note D, a thirteen-note construction which Stockhausen would use in later compositions such as Mantra and the Michael formula from Licht. This row (D E♭, C, A♭, B♭, F, G, E, F♯, C♯, B, A, D) then appears in its inverse and retrograde forms, but is not used in the lower voices. The clear tonal orientation to the key of D minor places the style closer to Stockhausen's teacher Hermann Schroeder than to Arnold Schoenberg.

== Discography ==
- Karlheinz Stockhausen: Chöre für Doris, "Choral", Atmen gibt das Leben, Punkte. Irmgard Jacobeit, soprano; Susanne Denman, soprano; Ulf Kenklies, tenor; NDR Chor; NDR Symphony Orchestra (in Punkte); Karlheinz Stockhausen, cond. LP recording, 1 disc, 33⅓ rpm, stereo, 12 in. Deutsche Grammophon 2530 641. Hamburg: Deutsche Grammophon, 1976. "Choral" reissued on CD, together with Chöre für Doris, Drei Lieder, Sonatine for violin and piano, and Kreuzspiel. CD recording, 1 sound disc: digital, stereo. 12 cm. Stockhausen Complete Edition CD1. Kürten: Stockhausen-Verlag, 2002.
