= Formel (Stockhausen) =

Formel (Formula) is a composition for chamber orchestra by Karlheinz Stockhausen, written while he was still a student in 1951. It is given the number 1/6 in his catalog of works, indicating that it is amongst the pieces preceding the composition he recognised as his first mature work, Nr. 1 Kontra-Punkte.

== History ==
Formel, originally titled Studie für Orchester (Study for Orchestra), was written in November and December 1951 immediately after Kreuzspiel and was intended to have been the first movement of a three-movement composition. When he completed the other two movements the following year, however, he decided their more punctual style did not fit well with the more thematic character of the intended opening, and the two 1952 movements became the separate composition Spiel. Only twenty years later did Stockhausen retrospectively discover in the early piece similarities to the formula technique he had devised for his then-latest composition, Mantra (1970). When asked by Maurice Fleuret for a new work for the 1971 Journées de Musique Contemporaine, Stockhausen offered this score, which he now gave the name Formel. The premiere was conducted by the composer at the Théâtre de Ville in Paris on 22 October 1971, on a concert that also featured several other compositions from his days as a student: the Drei Lieder for contralto and chamber orchestra, the Chöre für Doris, the Choral ("Wer uns trug mit Schmerzen"), all composed in 1950, and the Sonatine for violin and piano from 1951.

== Analysis ==
As with several other of Stockhausen's compositions of this period (Kreuzspiel, Spiel, the Schlagtrio, the original version of Punkte, and Kontra-Punkte), Formel gradually transmutes an initial basic pattern of notes into something else. Its form is chevron-like, first broadening the pitch space out from the centre, then systematically withdrawing notes from the middle until only the outer extremes remain—a sort of inside-out version of the procedure used in Kreuzspiel. Unlike its companion works, however, the tone row on which it is based is not treated punctually, with notes isolated from one another, but instead they are grouped into melodic cells.

== Instrumentation ==
Formel is scored for a small orchestra of 28 musicians:

- 3 oboes
- 3 clarinets in A
- 3 bassoons
- 3 horns
- vibraphone (with glockenspiel)
- celesta
- piano
- harp
- 6 violins
- 3 cellos
- 3 double basses

== Discography ==
- Stockhausen, Karlheinz. Inori, Formel. SWF Sinfonie-Orchester, Karlheinz Stockhausen, cond. Formel recorded 1 February 1978 at the Hans Rosbaud Studio, Baden-Baden. LP recording, 1 disc: stereo, 33 1/3 rpm, 12 in. DG 2707 111. Hamburg: Deutsche Grammophon, 1979. Formel reissued (together with Schlagtrio, Spiel, and Punkte) on CD recording, 1 disc: stereo, 4 3/4 in. Stockhausen Complete Edition CD 2. Kürten: Stockhausen-Verlag, 2005.

== Cited sources ==
- Frisius, Rudolf. 2008. Karlheinz Stockhausen II: Die Werke 1950–1977; Gespräch mit Karlheinz Stockhausen, "Es geht aufwärts". Mainz, London, Berlin, Madrid, New York, Paris, Prague, Tokyo, Toronto: Schott Musik International. ISBN 978-3-7957-0249-6.
- Kurtz, Michael. 1992. Stockhausen: A Biography, translated by Richard Toop. London and Boston: Faber and Faber. ISBN 0-571-14323-7 (cloth); ISBN 0-571-17146-X (pbk).
- Maconie, Robin. 2005. Other Planets: The Music of Karlheinz Stockhausen. Lanham, Maryland, Toronto, Oxford: The Scarecrow Press, Inc. ISBN 0-8108-5356-6.
- Stockhausen, Karlheinz. 1978. "Fresco für Orchester (1951)". In his Texte zur Musik 4: 1970–1977, edited by Christoph von Blumröder, 51. DuMont Dokumente. Cologne: DuMont Buchverlag. ISBN 3-7701-1078-1.
