= Atmen gibt das Leben =

- Choral opera in two parts by Karlheinz Stockhausen
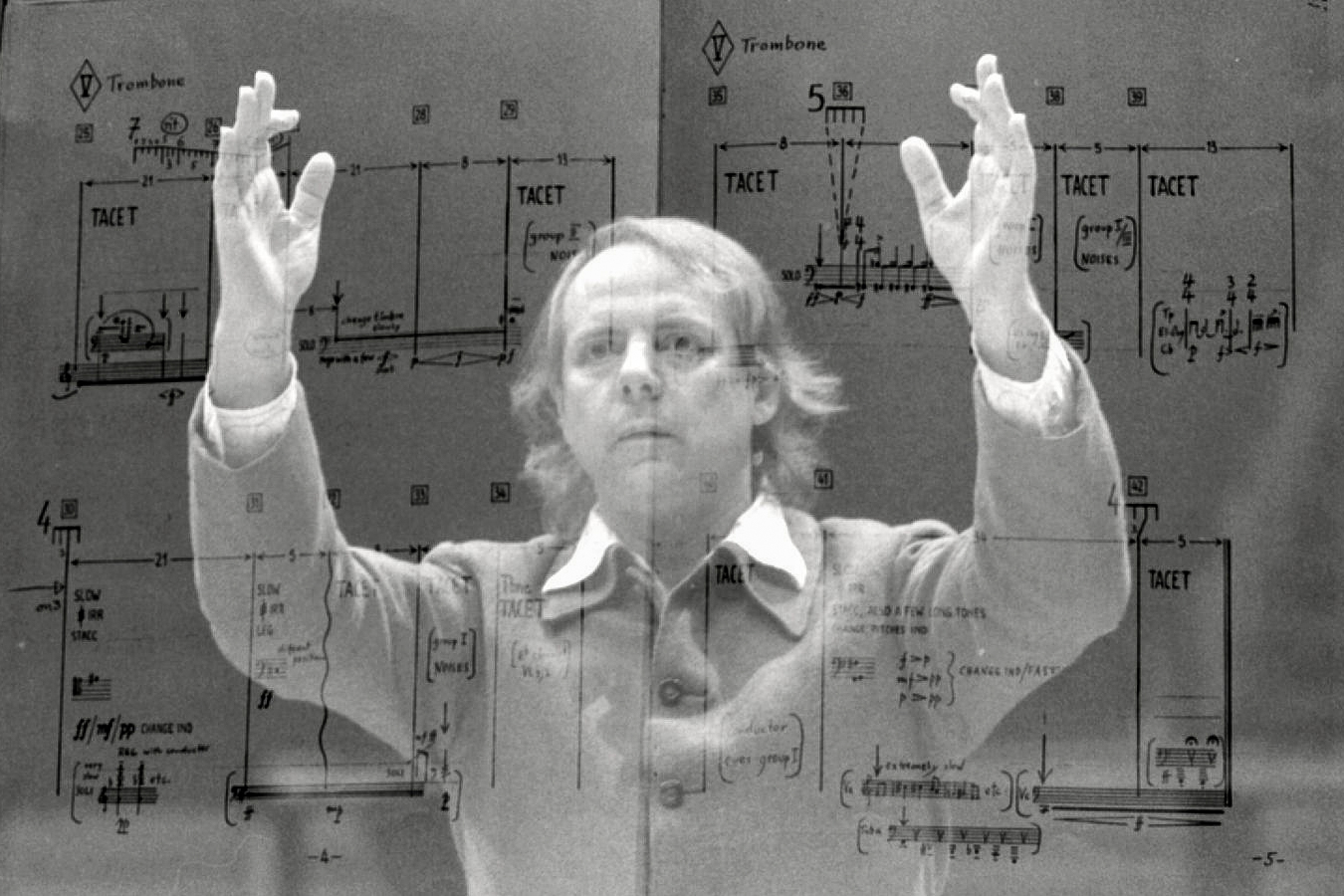
- The composer in 1980
- English: Breathing Gives Life
- Catalogue: 39
- Composed: 1974/1976–77
- Duration: 50 minutes
- Scoring: choir a cappella with solo parts, in Part II also orchestra (playback)

Part I
- "Atmen gibt das Leben"
- English: Breathing Gives Life
- Text: Aphorism by Inayat Khan
- Language: German
- Composed: 1974
- Dedication: Doris Stockhausen
- Scoring: choir a cappella

Premiere
- Date: 16 May 1975
- Location: Hamburg
- Performers: NDR Chor

Part II
- "Sing ich für Dich, singst Du für mich"
- English: If I sing for thee, you will sing for me
- Text: by Shiki, Buson, Issa, Socrates, Thomas, Meister Eckhart
- Language: German, English, and French
- Composed: 1976–1977
- Dedication: Christel Stockhausen
- Scoring: choir; orchestra

Premiere
- Date: 9 May 1977
- Location: Biennale Zagreb
- Performers: NDR Chor and orchestra

Part II – 2
- "Eine Welt von Sorge und Schmerz"
- English: A World Full of Sorrow and Pain

Premiere
- Date: 22 May 1977
- Location: Marc Chagall Museum, Nice
- Performers: NDR Chor and orchestra

Atmen gibt das Leben (Breathing Gives Life), is a choral opera with orchestra by Karlheinz Stockhausen, written in 1974 and expanded in 1976–77. It is Number 39 in the catalogue of the composer's works, and lasts about 50 minutes in performance.

== History ==
The first part of Atmen gibt das Leben was composed for a cappella choir during a composition seminar on 1 February 1974. This was in response to a request from the German Choral Association for a piece that could be sung by amateur choirs, and Stockhausen's original idea was that his students should each write a simple choral piece using a text from The Bowl of Saki, by Inayat Khan, and then all the pieces would be published together in a single volume. Not all of his students reacted favourably, and so the piece he composed himself for the project became the first part of Stockhausen's choral opera. This part was premiered by the NDR Chor, the choir of the Norddeutscher Rundfunk, in a public concert in Hamburg as part of the series Das Neue Werk on 16 May 1975. The choir soloists in this performance were Susanne Denman (soprano) and Ulf Kenklies (tenor). This first version of the score is dedicated to Stockhausen's first wife, Doris on her birthday, 28 February 1974.

Stockhausen interrupted work on Sirius in order to compose two further sections in December 1976 and January 1977, this time with an orchestra (which may be played back on tape) to support and colour the choir. The first of these additions, "Sing ich für Dich, singst Du für mich" (If I sing for thee, you will sing for me) was premiered by the NDR Chor on 9 May 1977 at the Biennale Zagreb. The same choir gave the premiere of the third part, "Eine Welt von Sorge und Schmerz" (A world full of sorrow and pain), as part of the first integral performance of the work on 22 May 1977 at the Marc Chagall Museum in Nice, as a pre-celebration of Chagall's 90th birthday, made possible by a commission from the French Minister for Religious Affairs. The two new sections (printed as a single part II in the score) were dedicated to the composer's daughter Christel Stockhausen on the occasion of her 21st birthday, 22 January 1977.

== Structure and technique ==
The libretto is by the composer, with the German text of part one being based on an aphorism by Inayat Khan. The German, English, and French text for the remainder incorporates six quotations: three haiku (by Shiki, Buson, and Issa), and one passage each from Socrates, the Gospel according to St. Thomas, and Meister Eckhart. There is no plot, and though the score is furnished with copious instructions and photographs of the German premiere in 1979, very little stage action is actually specified.

The musical core of the work is a four-voice refrain consisting of canonic variations on a serial formula. This theme is relatively diatonic, and more than one commentator has noticed a similarity to Stockhausen's chromatically tonal student choral compositions, written under the tutelage of Hermann Schroeder, some of which Stockhausen released on the same recording as the 1974 version of the choral opera. The similarity is especially close to the Chöre für Doris (1950) which, like the first part of Atmen gibt das Leben, is dedicated to Stockhausen's first wife.

By comically juxtaposing a variety of texts and references to different world cultures, Stockhausen creates a "phantasmagoria about the universe" and, in so doing, ensures that the "humble posture of admiration for God in the process of listening does not turn into bigoted false piety".

== Orchestra ==
The orchestra is scored for:

- 3 flutes
- 3 oboes
- 3 clarinets
- 3 bassoons
- 3 trumpets
- 3 high horns
- 3 low horns
- 3 trombones
- tuba
- triangle, large cymbal, bass drum
- glockenspiel
- piano
- first violins
- second violins
- violas
- cellos
- double basses

The number of string players per part is ad libitum; the score suggests 9–9–6–6–4 as an example.

== Discography ==
- Stockhausen, Karlheinz. Chöre für Doris; Choral; "Atmen gibt das Leben ..."; Punkte für Orchester. [first version of Atmen gibt das Leben]. North German Radio Symphony Orchestra Hamburg [in Punkte only]; NDR Chor, Karlheinz Stockhausen, cond. Deutsche Grammophon LP 2530 641. Hamburg: Polydor International, 1976.
- Stockhausen, Karlheinz. "Atmen gibt das Leben ...". Choir and Orchestra of the North German Radio Hamburg, Karlheinz Stockhausen, cond. (Orchestra recorded in Hamburg, April 1977; choir recorded 9 February 1979 at WDR in Cologne, with the pre-recorded orchestra played over loudspeakers.) Deutsche Grammophon LP 410 857–1. Hamburg: Polydor International, 1984. Reissued on CD, Stockhausen Complete Edition CD 23. Kürten: Stockhausen-Verlag, 1993.
