= Chöre für Doris =

Choral composition by Karlheinz Stockhausen

- Choral music by Karlheinz Stockhausen
- Other name: Chöre nach Verlaine
- Catalogue: 1/11
- Text: three poems by Paul Verlaine
- Language: German
- Composed: 1950
- Dedication: Doris Andreae
- Published: 1971
- Scoring: choir a cappella (four and eight parts)

Chöre für Doris (Choruses for Doris), after poems by Paul Verlaine, is a three-movement a cappella choral composition by Karlheinz Stockhausen, written in 1950 and later given the number 1/11 in the composer's catalogue of works. The score is dedicated to the composer's future wife Doris.

== History ==
During his third year of music-education studies at the Musikhochschule Köln, free stylistic exercises in composition were part of the program of training. Along with fugues, chorale preludes, sonatas, and song arrangements in various traditional styles, and a scherzo in the style of Paul Hindemith, Stockhausen wrote a number of choral pieces for the school choir in which he himself sang. Amongst them were these three Chöre nach Verlaine (Choruses after Verlaine), later retitled Chöre für Doris. The first and third choruses were completed on 3 and 1 August 1950, respectively. The exact date of composition of the second is unknown. Stockhausen, who had not considered himself a composer up to this point, decided shortly after finishing these choruses to attempt something more ambitious in his subsequent score, the Drei Lieder for alto voice and chamber orchestra.

All of these student works and a number of later ones remained unpublished until 1971, when Stockhausen rediscovered his early work Formel for chamber orchestra, and noticed affinities with his then-just-completed Mantra for two pianos and electronics. When Maurice Fleuret asked for a new piece to be performed at the Journées de Musique Contemporaine, Stockhausen offered Formel, and filled out the programme with a selection of other early compositions, including the Drei Lieder and the Sonatine for violin and piano. On this same programme, on 22 October 1971 at the Théâtre de la Ville in Paris, Marcel Couraud's chamber choir sang the Chöre für Doris for the first time, together with the contemporaneous Chorale ("Wer uns trug mit Schmerzen"). Chöre für Doris are the earliest of these works that Stockhausen allowed to be published.

== Analysis ==
The three choruses are:

1. Die Nachtigall (The Nightingale)
2. Armer junger Hirt (A Poor Young Shepherd)
3. Agnus Dei

The first and last pieces are scored for SATB choir (with a solo soprano added to the first), while the central chorus is for eight voices, SSAATTBB. According to another opinion, the second movement is for a mixed choir subdivided in up to seven parts. The texts employed are all German translations from Verlaine's French. The first two are translated by Georg von der Vring, and the third is in the translation by Rainer Maria Rilke.

The three texts have little in common to connect the three movements, though they all concern faith, hope, and love, in various ways.

"Die Nachtigall" is a poem concerning a lone nightingale singing melodiously against a crowd of noisy, frightened birds. Vring's German translation of the text of employs assonance and alliteration in a manner that recalls medieval poetry. The solo soprano, as the nightingale, represents the lost beloved, who remains alive only in remorseful memory. In the first stanza, she asserts melismatic independence against the syllabic setting of the chorus. The second stanza, a variant of the first, closes with a long soprano solo. In the third stanza the chorus, as a symbol of nature and personal memory, steps into the foreground, creating in the image of the moon a contrast with the image of the bird in the first two stanzas.

"Armer junger Hirt" may be thought of as the scherzo of the cycle. It has a pastoral theme, about a young shepherd who fears being kissed as if it might be like the sting of a bee. There are five stanzas of five lines each, where the last line of each stanza repeats the first, and the fifth stanza is a repetition of the first stanza. Instead of following the patterns in the text, Stockhausen varies his musical settings. For example, the opening line is presented softly in two mid-range voices, but returns at the end of the stanza loudly in five voices, subsiding again to the quiet sound of single, low-range voices. On the larger scale, the final stanza is made to begin like a slight variation of the first, but continues quite differently to achieve a powerful conclusion. The three stanzas in between are rich in tone painting, using the full choir in rising and falling movements and ostinato formations.

The third movement, "Agnus Dei", opens with an archaising two-voice texture for the first stanza, followed by a four-voiced choral texture in the following stanzas. The text of the first two stanzas portray the lamb. The rhythmic independence of the voices and suggestions of polyphony contrast sharply with the homophonic, chordal setting of the remainder of the movement, which follows the conventional text arrangement of the liturgy: the penultimate stanza invokes the Agnus Dei (Lamb of God) three times, together with the plea for mercy (miserere nobis), while the final stanza corresponds to the Dona nobis pacem. Stockhausen sets each invocation of the lamb a semitone higher than the previous one, each time followed by an expanded-tonal cadential construction, characterising the gentleness of the lamb. This periodic interruption of the lyrical flow breaks the dramatic mood and suggests windows into a different world. The chorus comes to a close on an archaic open fifth, recalling and balancing the pseudo-medieval duet that opened the movement.

== Discography ==
- Karlheinz Stockhausen: Chöre für Doris, Choral, Atmen gibt das Leben, Punkte. Irmgard Jacobeit, soprano; Susanne Denman, soprano; Ulf Kenklies, tenor; NDR Chor; NDR Symphony Orchestra (in Punkte); Karlheinz Stockhausen, cond. Chöre für Doris recorded 14 May 1975. LP recording, 1 disc, 33⅓ rpm, stereo, 12 in. Deutsche Grammophon 2530 641. Hamburg: Deutsche Grammophon, 1976. Chöre für Doris Reissued on CD, together with Choral, Drei Lieder, Sonatine for violin and piano, and Kreuzspiel. CD recording, 1 sound disc: digital, stereo. 12 cm. Stockhausen Complete Edition CD1. Kürten: Stockhausen-Verlag, 2002.
- Modern Choral Masterpieces. Chór Kameralny 441 Hz; Anna Wilczewska, cond. "Die Nachtigall" from Chöre für Doris, with works by eleven other composers. Recorded at the Resurrection Church in Gdańsk, 16–18 June 2014. CD recording, 1 sound disc: digital, stereo, 12 cm. DUX 1177. Warsaw: DUX Recording Producers, 2014.
- Pupils of Messiaen. Danish National Radio Choir; Jesper Grove Jørgensen, conductor. With works by Olivier Messiaen and Iannis Xenakis. Chöre für Doris recorded 2 February 1998, Danish Radio Concert Hall. CD recording, 1 sound disc: digital, stereo, 12 cm. Chandos, CHAN 9663. Colchester, Essex, England: Chandos, 1999.
