= Médiathèque Musicale Mahler =

Coordinates: 48.8786°N 2.3139°E

The Médiathèque Musicale Mahler is a multimedia library with collections relating to music of the 19th and 20th centuries. The institution is located in an elegant private house near the Parc Monceau in Paris at 11 bis rue de Vézelay (8th arrondissement). It was founded in 1986 as the Bibliothèque Gustav Mahler by the French biographer of Mahler, musicologist Henry-Louis de La Grange (1924-2017) and music critic, composer, and administrator Maurice Fleuret (1932–1990) in order to combine and make available to the public their extensive personal archives. The library's holdings have regularly been expanded and updated, and include original manuscript scores, letters, and other documents, and published scores, books, periodicals, press clippings, recordings (LPs, cassettes, and CDs), and other personal archives. Pierre Bergé (1930-2017), former director of the Théâtre de l'Athénée-Louis Jouvet and former President of the Paris Opera (1988–1994), succeeded La Grange as president of the Médiathèque in 2000. Its president has been Bruno Ory-Lavollée since 2017.

The association changed its name from Centre de Documentation Musicale-Bibliothèque Gustav Mahler to Médiathèque Musicale Mahler in 2002.

== See also ==
- List of libraries in France
