= Doris Stockhausen =

German music pedagogue (1924–2023)

- Stockhausen, before 1965
- Born: Doris Gertrud Johanna Andreae; 1924; Hamburg, Germany
- Died: 20 June 2023 (aged 99)
- Education: Musikhochschule Köln
- Occupations: Pianist; piano teacher
- Known for: Music dedicated to her
- Spouse: Karlheinz Stockhausen (m. 1951; div. 1965)
- Children: 4, including Markus, Majella

Doris Gertrud Johanna Stockhausen (née Andreae; 1924 – 20 June 2023) was the early muse and first wife of Karlheinz Stockhausen, who dedicated several compositions to her, beginning in 1950 with Chöre für Doris before they were married. After they separated she taught piano.

== Life ==
Doris Gertrud Johanna Andreae was born in Hamburg, the daughter of shipbuilder Max Andreae (1887–1973) and his wife Emmi Alwine, née Blohm (1890–1931). She studied piano at the Musikhochschule Köln, where she met Karlheinz Stockhausen, who also studied there. They were engaged in August 1951. Doris was raised Protestant, but converted to Roman Catholicism to prepare for her wedding.

They married – though both had no income yet, and against her family's wishes – on 29 December 1951 in Hamburg, shortly before the composer moved to Paris for studies. Their best men were the Belgian composer and musicologist Karel Goeyvaerts and the magician artist Alexander Adrion.

In the 1950s, Doris Stockhausen was not only her husband's wife, but also his muse and inspiration. She made it possible for him to focus on his compositions. She accompanied him on several tours, and met friends such as Henri Pousseur, György Ligeti, Cornelius Cardew, Earle Brown, Heinz-Klaus Metzger, David Tudor, Frederic Rzewski, Hugh Davies, and Rolf Gehlhaar, many of whom they often hosted at their home for extended periods.

In the early 1960s, Karlheinz Stockhausen fell in love with the artist Mary Bauermeister, but wanted to stay with his family with four small children. Doris Stockhausen was at first willing to live in a ménage à trois. Architect Erich Schneider-Wessling designed a home for them in Kürten, but when it was completed in 1964, Doris Stockhausen remained with the children in Cologne, where the children attended school. In 1965, the couple divorced, and she lived in Cologne where she worked as a piano teacher.

Doris Stockhausen died on 20 June 2023, at age 99.

== Music dedicated to Doris Stockhausen ==
Karlheinz Stockhausen dedicated Chöre für Doris to her while they were engaged; several more pieces followed during the 1950s. The last dedication was Vier Sterne weisen Dir den Weg (Four Stars Show You the Way) in 1976, with the stars representing their four children.

- 1950: Chöre für Doris
- 1950: Drei Lieder
- 1950: "Choral"
- 1951: Kreuzspiel
- 1952: Klavierstück III
- 1952: Spiel
- 1952: Schlagquartett
- 1955: Gesang der Jünglinge
- 1976: "Vier Sterne weisen Dir den Weg", the fifth piece in Amour

== Family ==
She was related to key figures at the German shipbuilding and engineering firm Blohm+Voss. Her grandfather Hermann Blohm was a co-founder, and her uncles Walther Blohm and Rudolf Blohm were directors.

Doris and Karlheinz Stockhausen had four children: Suja (born 1953), Christel (born 1956), Markus (born 1957), and Majella (born 1961). Markus Stockhausen is a trumpeter and composer in Cologne. Majella Stockhausen is a concert pianist; she is the dedicatee of several of her father's compositions (Klavierstücke, "Lucifer's Dream" from Samstag aus Licht), and premiered and recorded them (Donnerstag aus Licht, Samstag aus Licht, Tierkreis).
