= Kontra-Punkte =

- Chamber music by Karlheinz Stockhausen
- Catalogue: 1
- Composed: 1953
- Performed: 26 May 1953
- Scoring: ten instruments

Kontra-Punkte (Counter-Points, or Against-Points) is a composition for ten instruments by Karlheinz Stockhausen which resolves contrasts among six instrumental timbres, as well as extremes of note values and dynamic levels, into a homogeneous ending texture. Stockhausen described it: "Counter-Points: a series of the most concealed and also the most conspicuous transformations and renewals—with no predictable end. The same thing is never heard twice. Yet there is a distinct feeling of never falling out of an unmistakable construction of the utmost homogeneity. An underlying force that holds things together—related proportions: a structure. Not the same Gestalten in a changing light. But rather this: various Gestalten in the same light, that permeates everything."

== History ==
The first, untitled version, written in 1952–53, was a sparse-textured, "punctual" composition scored for flute, E-flat clarinet, contrabass clarinet, contrabassoon, trumpet, contrabass tuba, piano four hands, harp, violin, and double bass. This score was almost immediately rejected by the composer, who created a new version in the spring of 1953 for flute, clarinet in A, bass clarinet, bassoon, trumpet, trombone, piano (one player), harp, violin, and cello. This version has the distinction of being "Nr. 1" in the composer's catalog of works, although the Klavierstücke I–IV, designated "Nr. 2", were actually composed in the previous year.

The hyphenated title, while punning on the word Kontrapunkt (counterpoint), signifies a "counter-action" against the punctual style currently in vogue in the early 1950s, an action embodied in the composition itself as a process of transforming dissociated "points" into cohesive "groups" of notes, and therefore from an essentially static condition to an audibly dynamic one. The title also implies a criticism of Stockhausen's own earlier composition Punkte, as well as of his friend Pierre Boulez's 1951 work Polyphonie X—a criticism for which Boulez seems to have forgiven Stockhausen.

Kontra-Punkte was first performed during the ISCM World Music Days in Cologne on 26 May 1953 by members of the WDR Symphony Orchestra, conducted by Hermann Scherchen. This performance, however, was only of roughly the first two-thirds of the work, owing to lack of sufficient time for the pianist to prepare the extremely difficult closing part. Later that same year, Scherchen conducted the first complete performance on a Domaine musical concert in Paris. One review of the 1953 (partial) premiere reported that Scherchen immediately repeated the piece because, shortly after the beginning of the first performance, the pianist had gotten two bars behind, despite being assisted by the composer "who from time to time played a note obviously not within the capacity of ten fingers but required by the score".

Somewhat confusingly, an earlier, orchestral work by Stockhausen was titled "Kontrapunkte" (without the hyphen: "Counterpoints"). This work, suppressed by the composer at the time on grounds that it was unplayable, was drastically recomposed in 1962 and issued under the title Punkte (Points), by which name the original work is also now called.

== Analysis ==
"A 'punctual' ensemble style using ten soloists divided into six sound groups ((1) flute-bassoon, (2) clarinet–bass clarinet, (3) trumpet-trombone, (4) piano, (5) harp, (6) violin-violoncello) is transformed irregularly but steadily into a soloistic style articulated by 'groups', gradually focussing on the piano part". This version adds progressively longer insertions of denser note groups, often in single instruments, while at the same time gradually replacing more and more long notes with groups of rapid, shorter ones in a technique called Ausmultiplikation. This gradual erosion of the originally sparse texture, reflected in the hyphenated title (meaning "Against Points"), complements three parallel processes already present in the first version: (1) the heterogeneous timbres of the full ensemble are gradually reduced to the "monochrome" of the solo piano; (2) widely fluctuating durations reduce to similar values; (3) wide-ranging dynamics reduce to a generally soft level. This unidirectional process has been compared on the one hand to that of Maurice Ravel's Boléro, and on the other to Haydn's "Farewell" Symphony. Countless minor changes have been introduced in subsequent revisions, the last of which, in January 2004, replaced the A clarinet with the B-flat instrument.

== Discography ==
In chronological order of recording.

- Les Concerts du Domaine Musical: IV^{e} Concert—Saison 1956. Anton Webern: Symphonie op. 21; Deux Lieder, op. 8; Quatre Lieder, op. 13. Luigi Nono: Incontri. Karlheinz Stockhausen: Kontra-Punkte. Pierre Boulez: Le marteau sans maitre. Solistes du Domaine Musical; Pierre Boulez, cond. LP recording, 1 sound disc: 33⅓ rpm, monaural, 30 cm. Series: Présence de la musique contemporaine: Serie artistique. Vega C 30 A 66. [Paris]: Vega, 1956. Reissued on CD1 of: Pierre Boulez: Le Domaine Musical, 1956–1967. Vol. 1. CD recording, 5 sound discs: digital, mono, stereo, 12 cm. Accord 476 9209 (set): 476 8858, 476 8859, 476 8860, 476 8861, 476 9210. [France]: Accord; Universal Music France, 2006.
- The New Music. Karlheinz Stockhausen: Kontra-Punkte; Krzysztof Penderecki: Threnody to the Victims of Hiroshima; Earle Brown: Available Forms I; Henri Pousseur: Rimes pour différentes sources sonores. Frederic Rzewski, piano; Members of the RAI Rome Orchestra; Bruno Maderna, cond. LP recording, 1 sound disc: analog, 33⅓ rpm, stereo, 30 cm. RCA Victrola VICS 1239. New York, N.Y.: RCA Victrola, 1967. Reissued as Musica Nova vol. 1. LP recording. RCA 940044. [Paris]: RCA France, 1969. Also issued as disc 2 of 3-LP set: La Musica Nuova. LP recording, 3 sound discs: analog, 33⅓ rpm, stereo, 30 cm. RCA Italiana SLD-61005; [Italy]: RCA Italiana, [1960s]. Reissued on CD: 1 sound disc, stereo, 12 cm. Sony 49996 (88765499962). New York: Sony Music Entertainment, 2013.
- Stockhausen: Kreuzspiel, Kontra-Punkte Zeitmaße, and Adieu. London Sinfonietta (Sebastian Bell, flute; Antony Pay, clarinet; Roger Fallows, bass clarinet; William Waterhouse, bassoon; John Miller, trumpet; David Purser, trombone; John Constable, piano; Elizabeth Fletcher, harp; Marcia Crayford, violin; Christopher van Kampen, cello); Karlheinz Stockhausen, cond. (Kontra-Punkte recorded in the CTS Studio, Wembley (London), 8 July 1973) LP recording, 1 sound disc: 33⅓ rpm, monaural, 30 cm. DGG LP 2530 443. [Hamburg]: Deutsche Grammophon, 1974. Reissued together with Zeitmaße and Adieu from this same LP, with the addition of Stop (1965) from DGG LP 2530 442, on Stockhausen Complete Edition CD 4. Kürten: Stockhausen-Verlag, 2002.
- Karlheinz Stockhausen: Kontra-Punkte, Refrain, Zeitmaße, Schlagtrio. The ensemble recherche (Martin Fahlenbock, flute; Shizuyo Oka, clarinet; Mario Kopf, bassoon; Uwe Möckel, bass clarinet; Markus Schwind, trumpet; Andrew Digby, trombone; Jean-Pierre Collot, piano; Beate Anton, harp; Melisa Mellinger, violin; Åsa Åkerberg, cello; in the other works: Jaime González, oboe; Florian Hasel, cor anglais; Klaus-Steffes Holländer, celesta; Christian Dierstein and Mariko Nishioka, percussion), Rupert Huber, cond. CD recording, 1 sound disc: digital, stereo, 12 cm. Wergo WER 6717 2. Mainz: Wergo, a division of Schott Music & Media GmbH, 2009. Disc reissued as part of Music Of Our Time: 50 Years: 1962–2012. 5-CD set. Wergo 6946. Wergo, a division of Schott Music & Media GmbH, 2012.
