= Kreuzspiel =

Composition by Karlheinz Stockhausen

- Chamber music by Karlheinz Stockhausen
- Catalogue: 1/7
- Composed: 1951
- Dedication: Doris Andreae
- Performed: 1952
- Movements: 3
- Scoring: oboe; bass clarinet; piano; four percussionists; (and other stages)

Kreuzspiel (Crossplay) is a composition by Karlheinz Stockhausen written for oboe, bass clarinet, piano and four percussionists in 1951 (it was later revised for just three percussionists, along with other changes). It is assigned the number ^{1}/_{7} in the composer's catalogue of works.

== History ==
Stockhausen regarded Kreuzspiel as his first original composition, as opposed to the style-imitation exercises he did as part of his music studies. According to the composer, it was influenced by Olivier Messiaen's "Mode de valeurs et d'intensités" (1949) and Karel Goeyvaerts's Sonata for Two Pianos (1950), and is one of the earliest examples of "point" music. Kreuzspiel was premièred at the Darmstädter Ferienkurse in the summer of 1952, conducted by the composer. According to Stockhausen, the performance "ended in a scandal".

== Analysis ==
Kreuzspiel has been analysed in print more often than any other work by Stockhausen, though all but one restrict themselves to just the first of its three stages.

Though routinely described (by the composer as well as others) as a "serial" composition, Kreuzspiel does not employ a referential, recurring twelve-tone ordered set. Rather, it uses constant reordering of twelve-element (linked pitch, duration, dynamic, and—in the original version—attack) sets—a device sometimes called "permutational serialism" (e.g. Howel) It also uses a permutational seven-element system to control register.

The composition consists of three linked movements, or "stages". In the first stage, six notes begin in the highest register, and six others begin in the lowest register. These gradually move into the four middle octaves until an equal distribution of pitches throughout the entire range is achieved at the centre of the movement. From that point to the end of the movement, the process is reversed, so that all notes arrive again in the two extreme registers, only the six notes originally in the top are now at the bottom, and vice versa. The second movement carries out a similar formal process, only starting in the middle register, spreading out to all seven octaves, and then contracting again to the middle. The third movement superimposes the first two.

Compositional control of these shapes is determined in the first stage through the parameter of duration, while in the second stage the dominant element is pitch.(Kohl 1981, p. 18)

== Discography ==
- 50 Jahre neue Musik in Darmstadt, Vol. 1. Includes Kreuzspiel (3rd stage only, version with four percussionists). Romolo Grano, oboe; Friedrich Wildgans, bass clarinet; Irmela Sandt, piano; Hans Rossmann, Bruno Maderna, Willy Trumpfheller, and Paul Geppert, percussion; conducted by Karlheinz Stockhausen. Recorded 21 July 1952. CD recording. Col Legno WWE 1CD 31894. Munich: Col Legno, 1996. Also issued as part of 4-CD set, 50 Jahre neue Musik in Darmstadt. Col Legno WWE 4CD 31893 (box); vol. 1: WWE 1 CD 31894; vol. 2: WWE 1 CD 31895; vol. 3: WWE 1 CD 31896; vol. 4: WWE 1 CD 31897. Munich: Col Legno, 1996
- Stockhausen: Kreuzspiel; Kontra-Punkte; Zeitmaße; Adieu. London Sinfonietta, cond. Karlheinz Stockhausen. Kreuzspiel recorded in London, 21 March 1973. LP recording. 12 in. Deutsche Grammophon 2530-443 (stereo). [Hamburg]: Deutsche Grammophon, 1974. Reissued on CD in a different coupling, as Stockhausen: Chöre für Doris; Choral; Drei Lieder; Sonatine; Kreuzspiel. Stockhausen Complete edition CD 1. Kürten: Stockhausen-Verlag, 2002.
- Passeport pour le XXe siècle: Voyage guidé par Pierre Boulez. Ensemble intercontemporain, conducted by Pierre Boulez. Recorded 1987–88. Ensemble intercontemporain, conducted by Pierre Boulez. L'oeuvre du XXe siècle. Recorded Paris, IRCAM, 1987–1988. (Kreuzspiel excerpt only; with works by Igor Stravinsky, Edgard Varèse, Anton Webern, Luciano Berio, György Ligeti, and Pierre Boulez). CD recording. Disques Montaigne WM 334 88 518. Paris: Disques Montaigne, 1989. [Music taken from the six-part television series, Boulez xx^{e} siècle, presented by Jean-Pierre Cottet. Coproduction: FR3, la Sept, Caméras Continentales, IRCAM, Ensemble intercontemporain, and Centre Georges Pompidou, with support of the Caisse des Dépôts et Consignations, and participation of the Centre National de la Cinématographie. Kreuzspiel occurs in part 3, "Rhythm".] Reissued as Disques Montaigne 780518. The Kreuzspiel excerpt with otherwise different material reissued on disc 3 of D'un siècle à l'autre. 3-CD set. (With works by Janáček, Mahler, Debussy, Sibelius, Ravel, Bartók, Stravinsky, Shostakovich, Schoenberg, Ives, Webern, Varèse, Berg, Messiaen, Dutilleux, Carter, Xenakis, Ligeti, Berio, Kagel, Harvey, and Dusapin.) Montaigne/Naïve MO 782096 (box), disc 1: MO 782096–1, disc 2: MO 782096–2, disc 3: MO 782096–3. Paris: Montaigne/Naïve, 2000.
- Silbury Air. Sydney Alpha Ensemble (Linda Walsh, oboe; Sue Newsome, bass clarinet; Stephanie McCallum, piano; Daryl Pratt, Alison Eddington, and Alison Low Choy, percussion), conducted by David Stanhope. CD recording. ABC Classics 465 651–2. [Sydney]: Australian Broadcasting Corporation, 2000. (Besides Kreuzspiel, includes works by Harrison Birtwistle, Nigel Butterley, Luigi Dallapiccola, and Don Banks.)
- Musik in Deutschland 1950–2000 11, no. 1: "Instrumentale Kammermusik: Moderne Ensembles 1950–1970". Ensemble Avance and Ensemble Modern. CD recording. BMG Ariola 74321 73619 2. [Munich]: BMG-Ariola, 2005. (Besides Kreuzspiel, includes works by Stefan Wolpe, Rudolf Wagner-Régeny, Wolfgang Fortner, Herbert Brün, Paul Dessau, Friedrich Goldmann, and Werner Heider.)
- Karlheinz Stockhausen: Plus-Minus. Ives Ensemble (Esther Probst, oboe; Hand Petra, bass clarinet; John Snijders, piano; Arnold Marinissen, Wilbert Grootenboer, and Fedor Reunisse, percussion), conducted by Richard Rijnvos. Recorded 29 June to 2 July 2002 at Theater Romein, Leeuwarden, Netherlands. (In addition to Kreuzspiel, includes Stockhausen: Refrain and Plus-Minus.) CD recording. Hat Hut hat[now]ART 178. Basel: Hat Hut, 2010.
