= Drei Lieder (Stockhausen) =

Song cycle by Karlheinz Stockhausen

- Lieder by Karlheinz Stockhausen
- Other name: Lieder der Abtrünnigen
- Catalogue: 1/10
- Text: three poems by Stockhausen (the first later replaced by one by Charles Baudelaire)
- Language: German
- Composed: 1950
- Dedication: Doris Andreae
- Performed: 21 October 1971
- Scoring: alto; chamber orchestra

Drei Lieder (Three Songs), for alto voice and chamber orchestra, is a song cycle by Karlheinz Stockhausen, written while he was still a conservatory student in 1950. In the composer's catalogue of works, it bears the number ^{1}/_{10}.

== History ==
When the 21-year-old Stockhausen wrote the Drei Lieder in two weeks during the summer of 1950, he had no ambition to become a composer. He was approaching the end of his studies in music education at the Cologne Conservatory and, after numerous classroom exercises, wanted merely to try his hand at composing something of substantial proportions. The work was originally titled Lieder der Abtrünnigen (Songs of a Renegade), and set three poems written by the composer himself: "Mitten im Leben" (In the Midst of Life), "Frei" (Free), and "Der Saitenmann" (The Fiddler). (It is possible that there were originally five songs, but two were later destroyed.) The score is dedicated to Doris Andreae, who later became the composer's wife.

Stockhausen submitted the score to the jury for the Darmstädter Ferienkurse, but they rejected it, judging it as "too old-fashioned" and the texts as "too gruesome". In reaction, Stockhausen decided to replace the text of the first song with a German translation of a poem by Charles Baudelaire. When he successfully auditioned for admission to Frank Martin's composition class at the conservatory, it was the Drei Lieder that he presented, and he also submitted the score as one of two examination papers in his optional subject, composition (the other was the Sonatine for violin and piano). The score remained unperformed for twenty years, until Maurice Fleuret asked him for something to premiere at the SMIP concerts in Paris. Curious to hear what this work of juvenilia sounded like, Stockhausen offered the Drei Lieder, which were performed for the first time, sung by Brigitte Fassbaender, on 21 October 1971 under the composer's baton. Stockhausen conducted further performances in Rome in 1973 and with the Berlin Philharmonic in 1975, and made a recording for the SWR in the same year with Sylvia Anderson, mezzo-soprano, and the SWR Symphony Orchestra.

== Instrumentation ==
The chamber orchestra accompanying the alto voice consists of:

- Flute (doubling piccolo)
- E♭ clarinet
- A clarinet
- bassoon
- C trumpet (doubling D trumpet)
- percussion (two players)
- piano
- harpsichord (electrically amplified)
- trombone
- violins
- violas
- cellos
- contrabasses

== Analysis ==
The three songs are:

- Der Rebell (The Rebel)
- Frei (Free)
- Der Saitenmann (The Fiddler)

The musical language of the songs is eclectic, synthesizing elements of twelve-tone technique and neotonality with traits of the frantic German jazz of the 1930s. The influence of Berg and Schoenberg can be heard in the writing for the voice and the strings, while Stravinsky is often suggested by the bassoon lines and brass chords. The toy-soldier trumpet-and-side-drum flourishes that open each of the three songs, establishing their ironic character, recall Hindemith and Weill, and the frequent xylophone solos echo Bartók's Sonata for Two Pianos and Percussion, which became the subject of Stockhausen's graduation thesis in 1951. The third song seems to be under the spell of Olivier Messiaen (with whom Stockhausen would study in 1952), even including what appears to be a brief quotation from the French composer's Trois petites liturgies de la présence divine. However, it appears that Stockhausen only first became acquainted with Messiaen's music the month after completing the Drei Lieder.

The first song is a dialogue between the alto voice and the trumpet, setting a text by Baudelaire about refusing to submit to authority. The music of "Frei" is light and mercurial, in contrast to the grim humour of the text, in which Harlequin receives a knotted rope from the king. In a gesture reminiscent of the Alexandrian Solution, the jester defiantly cuts the knots with an axe.

== Discography ==
- Karlheinz Stockhausen. Drei Lieder, für Altstimme und Kammerorchester (1950); Sonatine, für Violine und Klavier (1951); Spiel, für Orchester (1952); Schlagtrio, für Klavier und 2 x 3 Pauken (1952). Sylvia Anderson, alto; Sinfonie-Orchester des Südwestfunks Baden-Baden, Karlheinz Stockhausen, cond. Saschko Gawriloff, violin; Aloys Kontarsky, piano. LP Recording, 1 disc: stereo, 12 in., 33⅓ rpm. DGG 2530 827. [Hamburg]: Deutsche Grammophon, 1977. This performance of the Drei Lieder reissued as part of La canción moderna II, with songs by Alban Berg and Benjamin Britten. Enciclopedia Salvat de los grandes temas de la música; 27. Stereo cassette tape. Fonogram 74 07 227. Madrid: Fonogram, 1983. The recordings of the Sonatine and Drei Lieder reissued, on Stockhausen: Chöre für Doris, Choral, Drei Lieder, Sonatine, Kreuzspiel. Chor des Norddeutschen Rundfunks (Irmgard Jacobeit, soprano), Karlheinz Stockhausen, cond. (first two works); members of the London Sinfonietta, Karlheinz Stockhausen, cond. (last work). Compact disc, 1 sound disc: stereo, 4¾ in. Stockhausen Complete Edition CD 1. Kürten: Stockhausen-Verlag, 2002.
