= Punkte =

Orchestral composition by Karlheinz Stockhausen

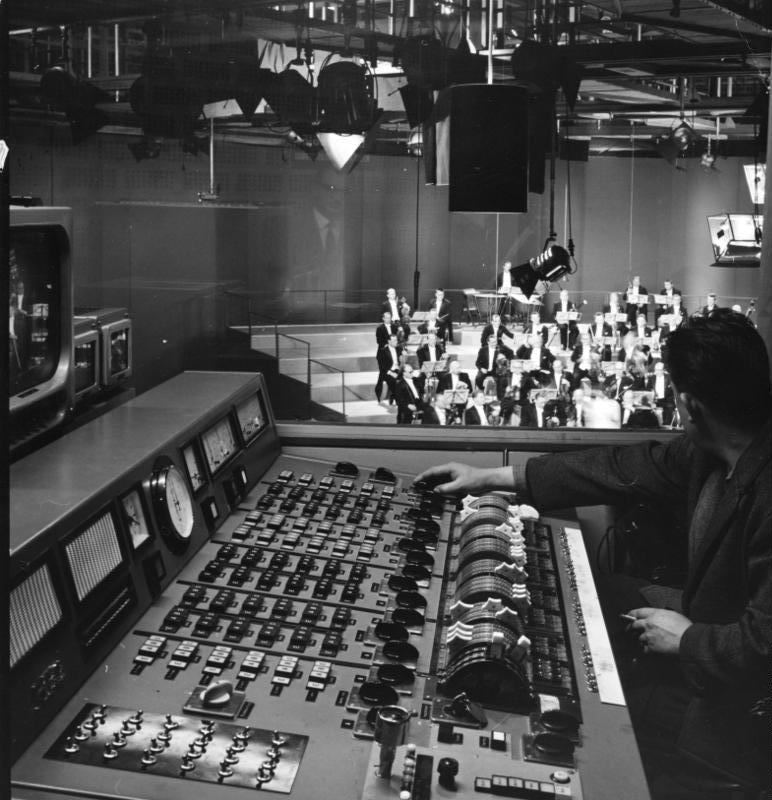
The SWF Orchestra on 12 March 1964, five months after premiering Punkte

Punkte (Points) is an orchestral composition by Karlheinz Stockhausen, given the work number ½ in his catalogue of works.

== History ==
Punkte originated as a punctual orchestral work which was begun in September in Hamburg and had reached a first-draft stage by 30 September. The final draft was completed on 24 October 1952, but the work remained unperformed and unpublished . The work did not receive the title by which it is known today until much later, however. In a letter dated 4 November 1952 to Alfred Schlee (the editor from Universal Edition in Vienna who, at the premiere of Stockhausen's Spiel at the Donaueschingen Festival in October, had offered to publish his works), Stockhausen initially called his new score Zweites Orchesterspiel / Kontrapunkte / für Saiten- und Blasinstrumente, and in a letter to his friend Karel Goeyvaerts dated 14 January 1953, he calls the orchestral work Nr. 4 Kontrapunkte, adding, "It will be very difficult to perform this work". At this point in time, the chamber composition now known as Kontra-Punkte (with a hyphen) was instead called simply Nr 5…, für 10 Instrumente. After a heated discussion in March with Hermann Scherchen, who Stockhausen hoped would conduct the work at a festival in Cologne, he decided to withdraw the score, and substituted the chamber work for ten instruments, now redesignated "Nr 1", and eventually given the title Kontra-Punkte. The withdrawn orchestral score, which has never been performed, was renamed Punkte at some unknown point in time.

Stockhausen wholly recomposed this score in 1962, at which time it was given the retrospective work number ½ (the fraction indicating that it preceded his "work number 1"). Work was begun during a four-week stay in Finland in the summer, when Stockhausen was lecturing at the Jyväskylä summer university. It was intended for performance in Palermo later in the year, but the score was not finished in time and the event was cancelled. Having rescheduled the premiere for Donaueschingen the following year, Stockhausen resumed work in October 1962 while staying at the house of his Darmstadt pupil Jack Brimberg in Locust Valley on Long Island, New York. After some anxious correspondence with Heinrich Strobel, director of the Donaueschingen Festival, the score was completed and dispatched to Strobel on 28 February 1963. In its new form, the "points" of the original version scarcely ever appear as such. Instead, they have become centres for groups, crowds, swarms, and vibrating masses, become nuclei of micro-musical organisms. This "renewed" composition was premiered on 20 October 1963 at the Donaueschingen Music Festival, by the Orchestra of the SWF, conducted by Pierre Boulez, and was published by Universal Edition that year in facsimile.

Not yet satisfied with the result, Stockhausen made major changes to the new Punkte in 1964, and again in 1966. These versions were also published, and Stockhausen made further revisions in 1969, at which time Universal Edition began work on an engraved edition. Production stopped in 1973 only to restart in 1974 and, after Stockhausen made still more revisions in 1975, work resumed the next year. The engraved score was only finally finished (with further minor corrections made up to 1993) in 1996.

== Instrumentation ==
=== 1952 version ===
The original version was for a small orchestra of either 27 or 30 players:

- 1 flute
- 2 oboes
- 1 E♭ clarinet
- 1 B♭ clarinet
- 1 bass clarinet in B♭
- 1 soprano (changing to alto) saxophone
- 1 baritone saxophone
- 1 bass saxophone or bass sarrusophone
- 2 bassoons
- 1 horn in B♭
- 1 cornet in B♭
- 1 trumpet in C
- 1 trombone
- 1 [or 3] percussionists, playing 12 chromatically tuned bongos
- 1 piano (with softer tone, such as a Blüthner)
- 1 piano (with harder tone, such as a Bechstein)
- 2 harps (one with thin strips of paper woven through the strings)
- 2 violins [or 2 each first and second violins]
- 2 violas
- 2 [or just 1] cellos
- 1 contrabass

=== 1962–93 version ===
- 3 flutes (all + piccolo, 3rd + alto flute in G)
- 3 oboes (ob. 1 + oboe d'amore; oboe 3 + cor anglais)
- 3 clarinets (E♭ clarinet, B♭ clarinet, and bass clarinet in B♭)
- 3 bassoons (third + contrabassoon)
- 3 horns in F
- 3 trumpets in C
- 1 tenor trombone
- 1 bass trombone
- 1 bass tuba
- 3 percussionists:
  - tubular chimes, keyboard glockenspiel, 2 pedal timpani
  - vibraphone
  - marimbaphone
- 2 harps
- 2 pianos (second + celesta)
- 8 first violins
- 8 second violins
- 8 violas
- 6 cellos
- 4 contrabasses

== Analysis ==
Punkte is divided into 144 overarching sections, characterised by sets of shapes and textures. Each isolated tone of the 1952 version was used as a "nucleus", and these nuclei were composed out into a variety of complex figures. There are six basic triangular shapes, with the nucleus at one apex:

1. The nucleus tone is sustained while other pitches expand above it into a band:
2. The nucleus tone is sustained while other pitches expand below it into a band:
3. A band of sound begins, and the upper notes descend until only the nucleus is left at the bottom:
4. A band of sound begins, and the lower notes ascend until only the nucleus is left at the top:
5. The first two shapes are combined, so that pitches fan out in both directions to form a band both above and below the nucleus
6. The third and fourth shapes are combined, so that a band of pitches narrows toward the nucleus at the centre

The vertical width of each pitch band is controlled by a serial distribution of chromatic intervals, from a single tone, via the minor second, major second, minor third, and so on up to a major seventh.

Each of these six shapes may be composed in any of six textures:

1. All notes continuous
2. Notes are rhythmicised
3. The sound texture is perforated by rests, sounding like Morse code
4. All notes in the texture make glissandos
5. All notes have tremolos or trills
6. The note attacks are "verticalised" into a succession of chords

Some of these textures can be combined. For example, the opening section of Punkte combines normal tones and trills. Similarly, there are places where the triangular sound shapes overlap so densely (due to the density of the points in the structure of the original 1952 version) that the entire space is filled with sound, leaving no silences. This situation suggested the idea of negative forms. The usual conception is that sounds are heard as being projected against a background of silence. In these negative structures, the situation is reversed. Sustained clusters are made to sound for a comparatively long time, from which some of the sounds are erased. The "holes" therefore are the music.

Both durations and pitches are distributed through the use of permutations, which serve as an aid to repetition, without repeating exactly the same thing. Diversity in unity is the principle of permutation, in dividing the larger elements into their smaller components.

== Discography ==
1962 version

- Donaueschinger Musiktage 1950–1990. Includes the world premiere of the 1962 version of Punkte, by the SWF Symphonie Orchester, Pierre Boulez, cond. Col Legno AU-031800 CD (4 CDs). Staufen im Breisgau: Aurophon, 1990. Also issued on 75 Jahren Donaueschinger Musiktage 1921–1996. Col Legno WWE 12CD 31889 (12 CDs). [N.p.]: Col Legno Musikproduktion GmbH, 1996.

1966 version

- Stockhausen, Karlheinz. Chöre für Doris; Choral; "Atmen gibt das Leben . . ."; Punkte für Orchester. North German Radio Symphony Orchestra Hamburg [in Punkte only]; Choir of the North German Radio Hamburg, Karlheinz Stockhausen, cond. Deutsche Grammophon LP 2530 641. Hamburg: Polydor International, 1976. This recording of Punkte reissued with Formel, Schlagtrio, and Spiel, on Stockhausen Complete Edition CD 2. Kürten: Stockhausen-Verlag, 2005.

1993 version

- Stockhausen, Karlheinz. Gruppen für drei Orchester; Punkte. WDR Symphony Orchester, Arturo Tamayo, Péter Eötvös, Jacques Mercier, conds. (in Gruppen); Péter Eötvös, cond. (in Punkte). BMC CD 117. Punkte reissued separately, with a spoken introduction by the composer in German and English, on Stockhausen Complete Edition CD 81. Kürten: Stockhausen-Verlag, 2005.
