= Sonatine (Stockhausen) =

1951 composition for violin and piano

- Chamber music by Karlheinz Stockhausen
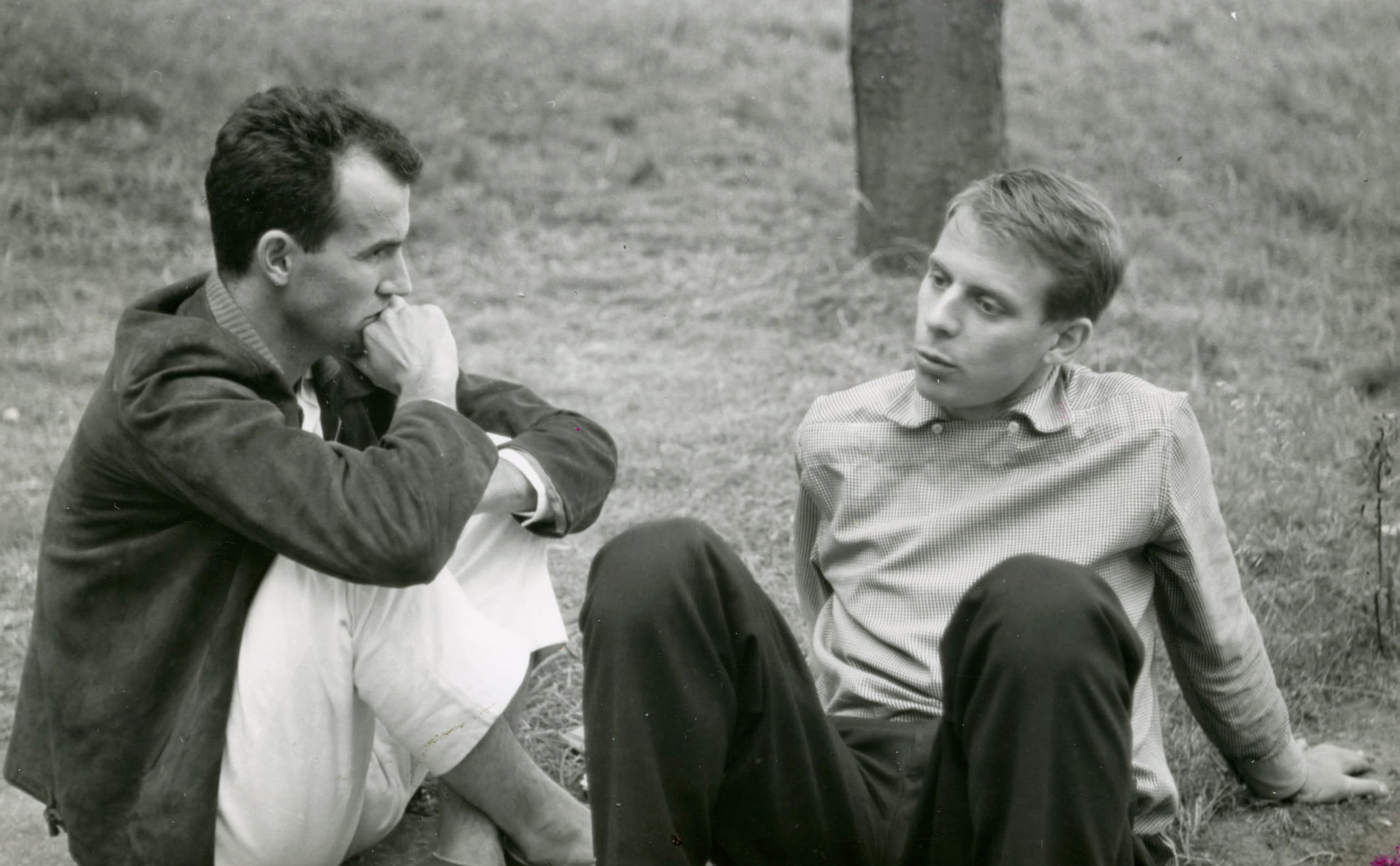
- Karlheinz Stockhausen (r.) with Luigi Nono in 1957
- Catalogue: 1/8
- Based on: Präludium
- Composed: 1951
- Performed: 24 August 1951
- Scoring: violin; piano

The Sonatine (Sonatina) for violin and piano is a chamber music composition by Karlheinz Stockhausen, written while he was still a student in 1951. It carries the work-number 1/8 in his catalogue of works.

== History ==
Stockhausen composed the Sonatine as the second of two "free works" required for his final examinations at the Cologne Conservatory. The piano part of the first movement was composed originally as a separate work, titled Präludium, and the violin part was then superimposed. The manuscript of the completed composition is dated 19 March 1951. It was premiered by Wolfgang Marschner, concertmaster of the NWDR Symphony Orchestra, with the composer at the piano, in a broadcast recording transmitted for the first time on 24 August 1951. The first performance before a live audience, however, did not occur until twenty years later, when Saschko Gawriloff (violin) and Aloys Kontarsky (piano) played it on 22 October 1971 at a concert of the SMIP in Paris.

== Analysis ==
The work is not so much an integrated composition as three disparate style exercises, related only through the use of a common twelve-tone row in which thirds and perfect fifths predominate. Together with the Drei Lieder for alto and chamber orchestra, composed the previous summer, the Sonatine is the most significant example of Stockhausen's employment of classical Schoenbergian twelve-tone technique, but at the same time both compositions integrate this technique with aspects of neotonality and stylistic features associated with neoclassicism. The three movements, played without pause, are:

1. Lento espressivo—vivacetto irato—tempo 1
2. Molto moderato e cantabile
3. Allegro scherzando

The first movement is lyrical and restrained in character, similar in character to a three-part invention in which rhythmic motives join with row transformations to produce the structure. On the other hand, it also resembles a small sonata-allegro form, beginning with the polyphonic superimposition of three different forms of the row (prime and retrograde in the right and left hands of the piano, inversion in the violin), all beginning on the same pitch, C_{5}. The opening, slow section functions as an exposition. The middle section, in a faster tempo, is a sort of development section, and the final section returns to the opening tempo and material as a recapitulation.

In contrast to the polyphonic texture of the first movement, the second is more homophonic, with a slow boogie-woogie rhythm in the bass. The violin is muted throughout, and becomes separated from the increasingly heavy piano part as it floats upward. The movement is through-composed with an overall slowing process which Stockhausen described as "incredibly meditative, like Stimmung", and ends with the violin playing sextuplets against quadruplets in the piano.

The finale is dominated by polytonal chords, which accumulate into dense layers. The movement ends with a three-note chord, duplicated in the two hands of the piano as well as the violin, consisting of the notes C, D♭, and A♭. These notes were the predominating melodic notes at the beginning of this movement, as well as at the start of the first movement, and constitute the first trichord of the prime form of the basic row, which dominates all of the Sonatine.

== Discography ==
- Karlheinz Stockhausen: Drei Lieder, für Altstimme und Kammerorchester (1950); Sonatine, für Violine und Klavier (1951); Spiel, für Orchester (1952); Schlagtrio, für Klavier und 2 x 3 Pauken (1952). Sylvia Anderson, alto; Sinfonie-Orchester des Südwestfunks Baden-Baden, Karlheinz Stockhausen, cond. Saschko Gawriloff, violin; Aloys Kontarsky, piano. LP Recording, 1 disc: stereo, 12 in (300 mm), 33 1/3 rpm. DGG 2530 827. [Hamburg]: Deutsche Grammophon, 1977. These recordings of the Sonatine and Drei Lieder reissued, on Stockhausen: Chöre für Doris, Choral, Drei Lieder, Sonatine, Kreuzspiel. Chor des Norddeutschen Rundfunks (Irmgard Jacobeit, soprano), Karlheinz Stockhausen, cond. (first two works); members of the London Sinfonietta, Karlheinz Stockhausen, cond. (last work). Compact disc, 1 sound disc: stereo, 4 3/4 in (120 mm) Stockhausen Complete Edition CD 1. Kürten: Stockhausen-Verlag, 2002.

== Cited sources ==
- Frisius, Rudolf (2008). Karlheinz Stockhausen II: Die Werke 1950–1977; Gespräch mit Karlheinz Stockhausen, "Es geht aufwärts". Mainz, London, Berlin, Madrid, New York, Paris, Prague, Tokyo, Toronto: Schott Music. ISBN 978-3-79-570249-6.
- Kurtz, Michael (1992). Stockhausen: A Biography. Translated by Toop, Richard. London, Boston: Faber and Faber. ISBN 0-571-14323-7.
- Maconie, Robin (2016). Other Planets: The Complete Works of Karlheinz Stockhausen, 1950–2007, updated edition. Lanham, Maryland; Boulder, Colorado; New York; London: Rowman & Littlefield. ISBN 978-1-44-227267-5.
- Stockhausen, Karlheinz (1978). Blumröder, Christoph von (ed.). Sonatine für Violine und Klavier (1951). Texte zur Musik 4 (1970–1977). Cologne: DuMont Buchverlag. pp. 46–47. ISBN 3-7701-1078-1.
