= Karlheinz Stockhausen =

German composer (1928–2007)

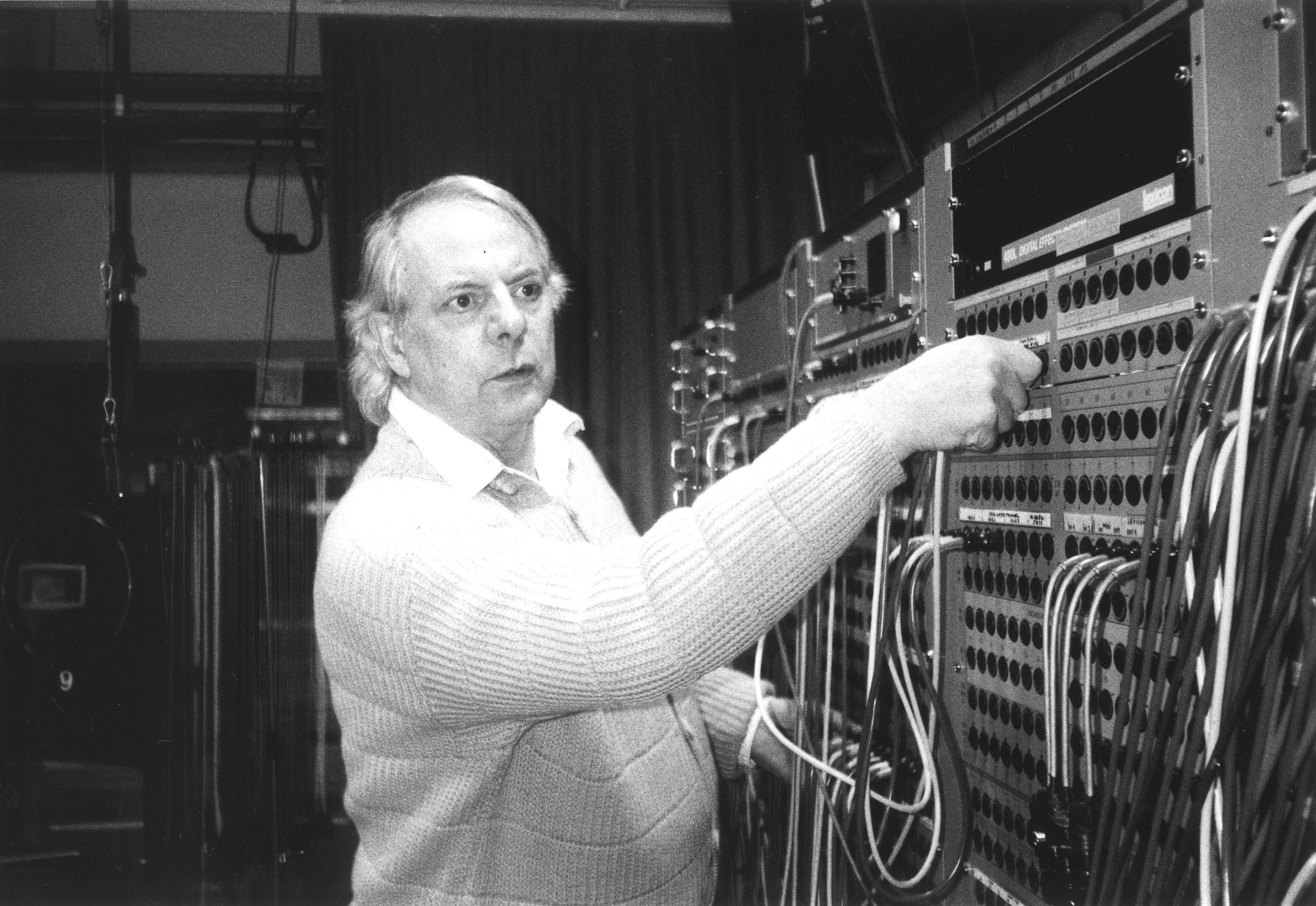
Stockhausen in the Electronic Music Studio of the WDR, 1994

Karlheinz Stockhausen (German: [kaʁlˈhaɪnts ˈʃtɔkhaʊzn̩]; 22 August 1928 – 5 December 2007) was a German composer, widely acknowledged by critics as one of the most important but also controversial composers of the 20th and early 21st centuries. He is known for his groundbreaking work in electronic music, having been called the "father of electronic music", for introducing controlled chance (aleatory techniques) into serial composition, and for musical spatialization.

Stockhausen was educated at the Hochschule für Musik Köln and the University of Cologne, later studying with Olivier Messiaen in Paris and with Werner Meyer-Eppler at the University of Bonn. As one of the leading figures of the Darmstadt School, his compositions and theories were and remain widely influential, not only on composers of art music, but also on jazz and popular music. His works, composed over a period of nearly sixty years, eschew traditional forms. In addition to electronic music – both with and without live performers – they range from miniatures for musical boxes through works for solo instruments, songs, chamber music, choral and orchestral music, to a cycle of seven full-length operas. His theoretical and other writings comprise ten large volumes. He received numerous prizes and distinctions for his compositions, recordings, and for the scores produced by his publishing company.

His notable compositions include the series of nineteen Klavierstücke (Piano Pieces), Kontra-Punkte for ten instruments, the electronic/musique-concrète Gesang der Jünglinge, Gruppen for three orchestras, the percussion solo Zyklus, Kontakte, the cantata Momente, the live-electronic Mikrophonie I, Hymnen, Stimmung for six vocalists, Aus den sieben Tagen, Mantra for two pianos and electronics, Tierkreis, Inori for soloists and orchestra, and the gigantic opera cycle Licht.

He died at the age of 79, on 5 December 2007 at his home in Kürten, Germany.

== Biography ==
=== Childhood ===
Stockhausen was born in Burg Mödrath, the "castle" of the village of Mödrath. The village, located near Kerpen in the Cologne region, was displaced in 1956 to make way for lignite strip mining, but the castle itself still stands. Despite its name, the building is more a manor house than a castle. Built in 1830 by a local businessman named Arend, it was called by locals Burg Mödrath. From 1925 to 1932 it was the maternity home of the Bergheim district, and after the war it served for a time as a shelter for war refugees. In 1950, the owners, the Düsseldorf chapter of the Knights of Malta, turned it into an orphanage, but it was subsequently returned to private ownership and became a private residence again. In 2017, an anonymous patron purchased the house and opened it in April 2017 as an exhibition space for modern art, with the first floor to be used as the permanent home of the museum of the WDR Electronic Music Studio, where Stockhausen had worked from 1953 until shortly before WDR closed the studio in 2000.

His father, Simon Stockhausen, was a schoolteacher, and his mother Gertrud (née Stupp) was the daughter of a prosperous family of farmers in Neurath in the Cologne Bight. A daughter, Katherina, was born the year after Karlheinz, and a second son, Hermann-Josef ("Hermännchen") followed in 1932. Gertrud played the piano and accompanied her own singing but, after three pregnancies in as many years, experienced a mental breakdown and was institutionalized in December 1932, followed a few months later by the death of her younger son, Hermann.

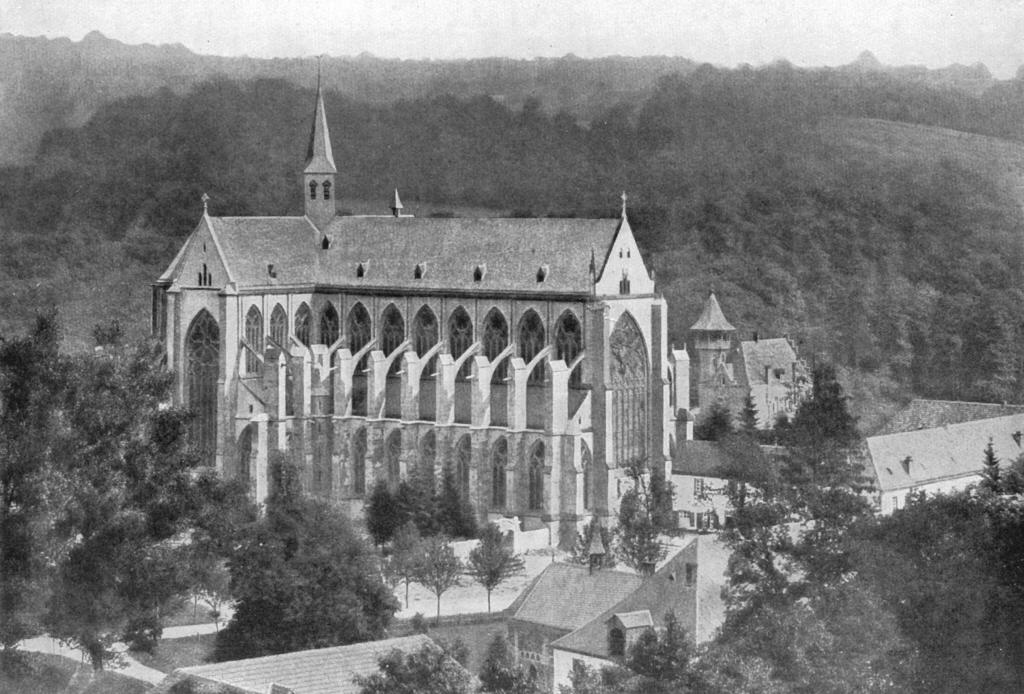
Altenberger Dom, c. 1925, where Stockhausen had his first music lessons

From the age of seven, Stockhausen lived in Altenberg, where he received his first piano lessons from the Protestant organist of the Altenberger Dom, Franz-Josef Kloth. In 1938, his father remarried. His new wife, Luzia, had been the family's housekeeper. The couple had two daughters. Because his relationship with his new stepmother was less than happy, in January 1942 Karlheinz became a boarder at the teachers' training college in Xanten, where he continued his piano training and also studied oboe and violin. In 1941, he learned that his mother had died, ostensibly from leukemia, although everyone at the same hospital had supposedly died of the same disease. It was generally understood that she had been a victim of the Nazi policy of killing "useless eaters". The official letter to the family falsely claimed she had died 16 June 1941, but recent research by Lisa Quernes, a student at the Landesmusikgymnasium in Montabaur, has determined that she was murdered in the gas chamber, along with 89 other people, at the Hadamar killing centre in Hesse-Nassau on 27 May 1941. Stockhausen dramatized his mother's death in hospital by lethal injection, in act, 1 scene 2 ("Mondeva"), of the opera Donnerstag aus Licht.

In late 1944, Stockhausen was conscripted to serve as a stretcher bearer in Bedburg. In February 1945, he met his father for the last time in Altenberg. Simon, who was on leave from the front, told his son, "I'm not coming back. Look after things." By the end of the war, the father was missing in action, presumably killed in Hungary.

=== Education ===
From 1947 to 1951, Stockhausen studied music pedagogy and piano at the Hochschule für Musik Köln (Cologne Conservatory of Music) and musicology, philosophy, and German studies at the University of Cologne. He had training in harmony and counterpoint, the latter with Hermann Schroeder, but he did not develop a real interest in composition until 1950. He was admitted at the end of that year to the class of Swiss composer Frank Martin, who had just begun a seven-year tenure in Cologne.

At the Darmstädter Ferienkurse in 1951, Stockhausen met Belgian composer Karel Goeyvaerts, who had just completed studies with Olivier Messiaen (analysis) and Darius Milhaud (composition) in Paris, and Stockhausen resolved to do likewise. He arrived in Paris on 8 January 1952 and began attending Messiaen's courses in aesthetics and analysis, as well as Milhaud's composition classes. He continued with Messiaen for a year, but he was disappointed with Milhaud and abandoned his lessons after a few weeks.

In March 1953, he left Paris to take up a position as assistant to Herbert Eimert at the newly established Electronic Music Studio of Nordwestdeutscher Rundfunk (NWDR) (from 1 January 1955, Westdeutscher Rundfunk, or WDR) in Cologne. In 1963, he succeeded Eimert as director of the studio. From 1954 to 1956, he studied phonetics, acoustics, and information theory with Werner Meyer-Eppler at the University of Bonn. Together with Eimert, Stockhausen edited the journal Die Reihe from 1955 to 1962.

=== Career and adult life ===
==== Family and home ====
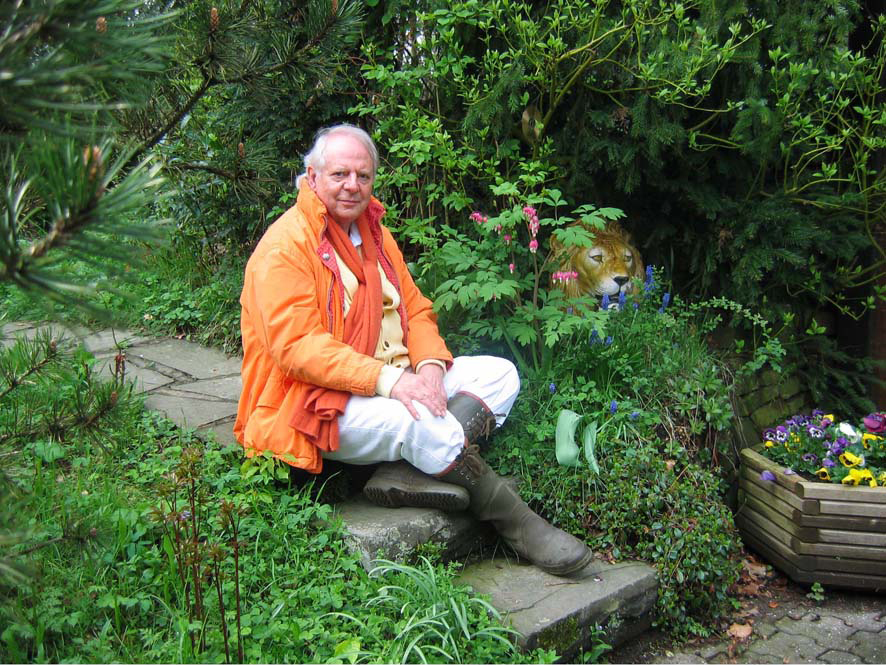
Stockhausen in the garden of his home in Kürten, 2005

On 29 December 1951, in Hamburg, Stockhausen married Doris Andreae. Together they had four children: Suja (b. 1953), Christel (b. 1956), Markus (b. 1957), and Majella (b. 1961). They were divorced in 1965. On 3 April 1967, in San Francisco, he married Mary Bauermeister, with whom he had two children: Julika (b. 22 January 1966) and Simon (b. 1967). They were divorced in 1972.

Four of Stockhausen's children became professional musicians, and he composed some of his works specifically for them. A large number of pieces for the trumpet – from Sirius (1975–77) to the trumpet version of In Freundschaft (1997) – were composed for and premièred by his son Markus. Markus, at the age of 4 years, had performed the part of The Child in the Cologne première of Originale, alternating performances with his sister Christel. Klavierstück XII and Klavierstück XIII (and their versions as scenes from the operas Donnerstag aus Licht and Samstag aus Licht) were written for his daughter Majella, and were first performed by her at the ages of 16 and 20, respectively. The saxophone duet in the second act of Donnerstag aus Licht, and a number of synthesizer parts in the Licht operas, including Klavierstück XV ("Synthi-Fou") from Dienstag, were composed for his son Simon, who also assisted his father in the production of the electronic music from Freitag aus Licht. His daughter Christel is a flautist who performed and gave a course on interpretation of Tierkreis in 1977, later published as an article.

In 1961, Stockhausen acquired a parcel of land in the vicinity of Kürten, a village east of Cologne, near Bergisch Gladbach in the Bergisches Land. He had a house built there, which was designed to his specifications by the architect Erich Schneider-Wessling, and he resided there from its completion in the autumn of 1965.

==== Teaching ====
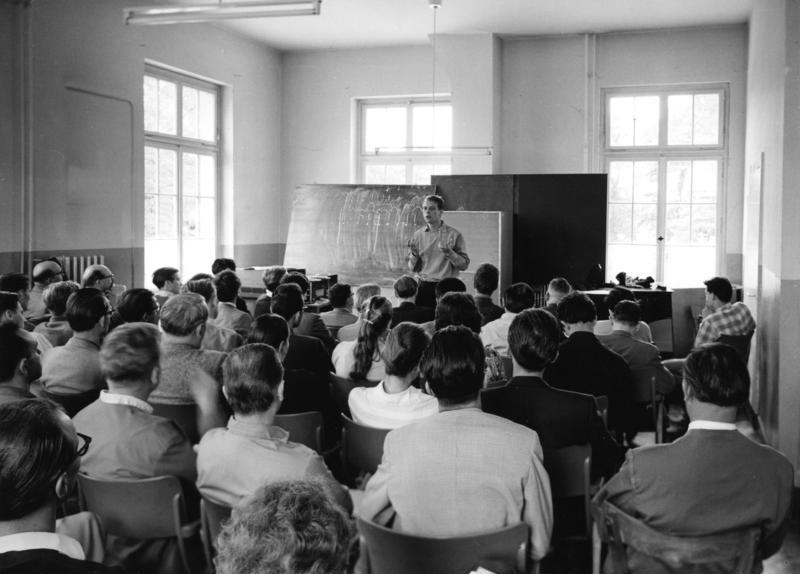
Stockhausen lecturing at the 12th International Summer Courses for New Music in Darmstadt, 1957

After lecturing at the Internationale Ferienkurse für Neue Musik at Darmstadt (first in 1953), Stockhausen gave lectures and concerts in Europe, North America, and Asia. He was guest professor of composition at the University of Pennsylvania in 1965 and at the University of California, Davis in 1966–67. He founded and directed the Cologne Courses for New Music from 1963 to 1968, and was succeeded by Mauricio Kagel in 1969. He was appointed Professor of Composition at the Hochschule für Musik Köln in 1971, where he taught until 1977. In 1998, he founded the Stockhausen Courses, which are held annually in Kürten.

==== Publishing ====
From the mid-1950s onward, Stockhausen designed (and in some cases arranged to have printed) his own musical scores for his publisher, Universal Edition, which often involved unconventional devices. The score for his piece Refrain, for instance, includes a rotatable (refrain) on a transparent plastic strip. Early in the 1970s, he ended his agreement with Universal Edition and began publishing his own scores under the Stockhausen-Verlag imprint. This arrangement allowed him to extend his notational innovations (for example, dynamics in Weltparlament [the first scene of Mittwoch aus Licht] are coded in colour) and resulted in eight German Music Publishers Society Awards between 1992 (Luzifers Tanz) and 2005 (Hoch-Zeiten, from Sonntag aus Licht). The Momente score, published just before Stockhausen's death in 2007, won this prize for the ninth time.

In the early 1990s, Stockhausen reacquired the licenses to most of the recordings of his music he had made to that point, and started his own record company to make this music permanently available on Compact Disc.

=== Death ===
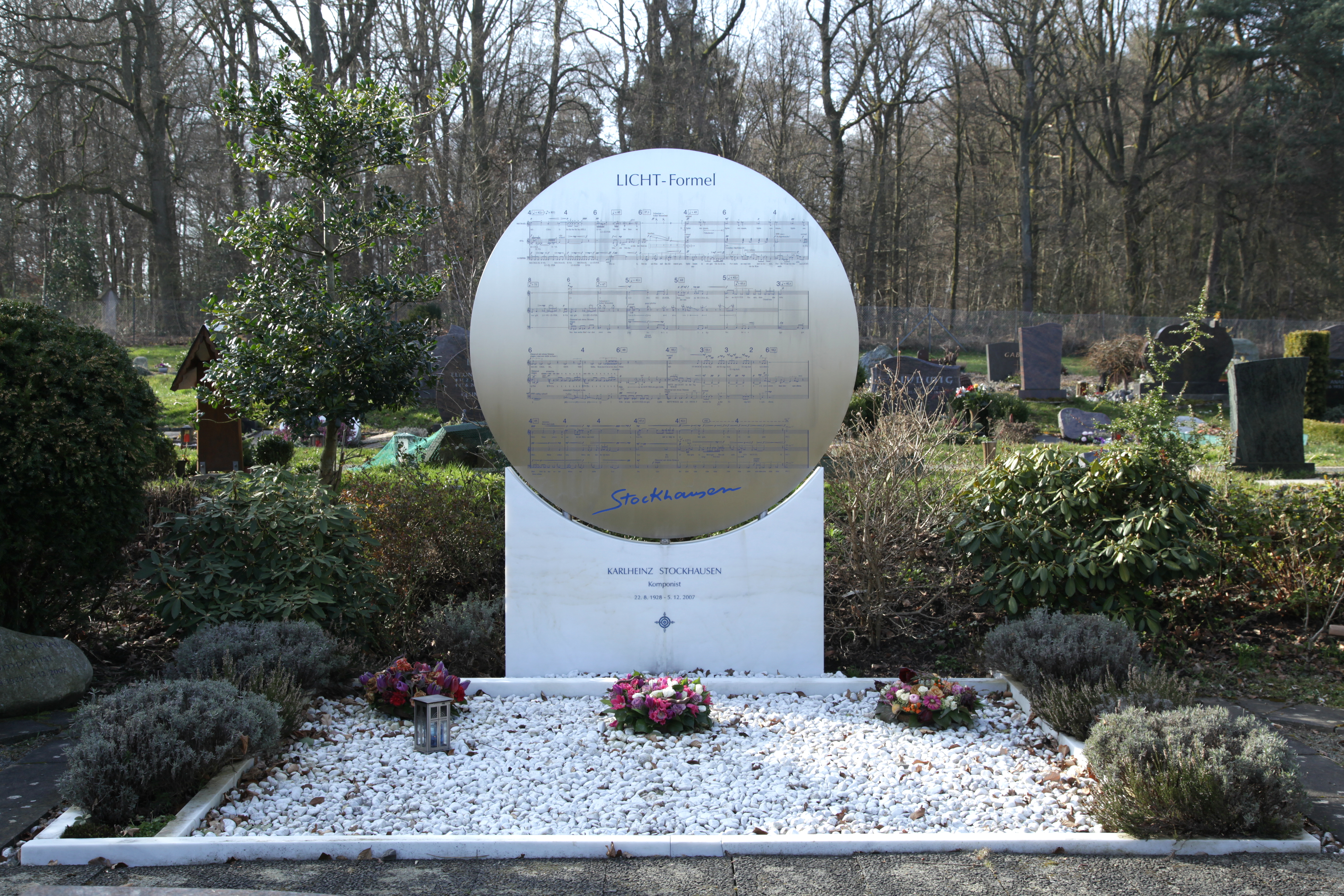
Stockhausen's grave, Waldfriedhof, Kürten

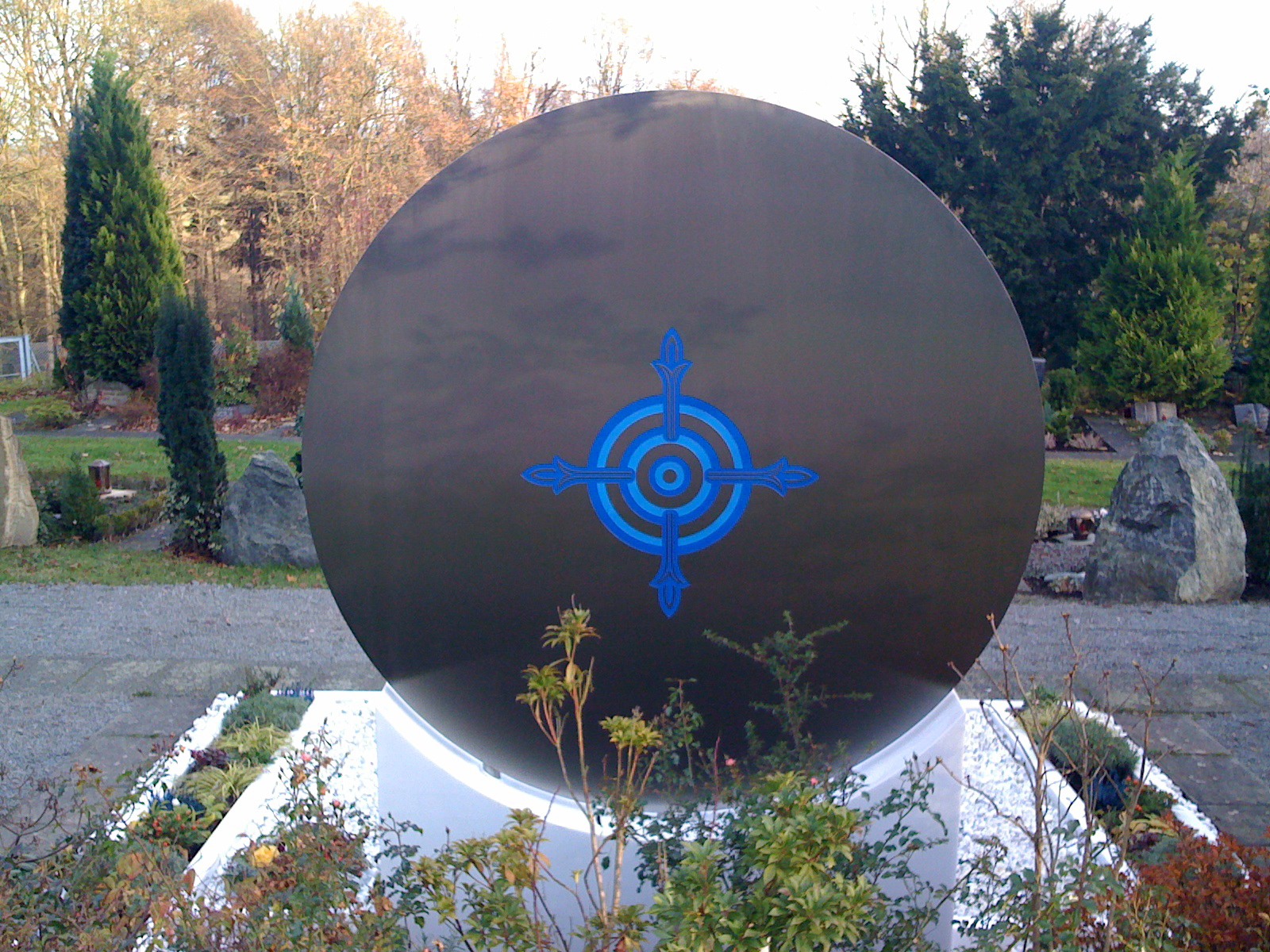
Grave monument (rear view)

Stockhausen died of sudden heart failure on the morning of 5 December 2007 in Kürten, North Rhine-Westphalia. The night before, he had finished a recently commissioned work for performance by the Mozart Orchestra of Bologna. He was 79 years old.

== Compositions ==
Stockhausen wrote 370 individual works. He often departs radically from musical tradition and his work is influenced by Olivier Messiaen, Edgard Varèse, and Anton Webern, as well as by film and by painters such as Piet Mondrian and Paul Klee.

=== 1950s ===
Stockhausen began to compose in earnest only during his third year at the conservatory. His early student compositions remained out of the public eye until, in 1971, he published Chöre für Doris, Drei Lieder for alto voice and chamber orchestra, Choral for a cappella choir (all three from 1950), and a Sonatine for violin and piano (1951).

In August 1951, just after his first Darmstadt visit, Stockhausen began working with a form of athematic serial composition that rejected the twelve-tone technique of Schoenberg. He characterized many of these earliest compositions (together with the music of other, like-minded composers of the period) as punktuelle Musik, "punctual" or "pointist" music, commonly mistranslated as "pointillist", though one critic concluded after analysing several of these early works that Stockhausen "never really composed punctually". Compositions from this phase include Kreuzspiel (1951), the Klavierstücke I–IV (1952 – the fourth of this first set of four Klavierstücke, titled Klavierstück IV, is specifically cited by Stockhausen as an example of "punctual music", and the first (unpublished) versions of Punkte and Kontra-Punkte (1952). However, several works from these same years show Stockhausen formulating his "first really ground-breaking contribution to the theory and, above all, practice of composition", that of "group composition", found in Stockhausen's works as early as 1952 and continuing throughout his compositional career. This principle was first publicly described by Stockhausen in a radio talk from December 1955, titled "Gruppenkomposition: Klavierstück I".

In December 1952, he composed a Konkrete Etüde, realized in Pierre Schaeffer's Paris musique concrète studio. In March 1953, he moved to the NWDR studio in Cologne and turned to electronic music with two Electronic Studies (1953 and 1954), and then introducing spatial placements of sound sources with his mixed concrète and electronic work Gesang der Jünglinge (1955–56). Experiences gained from the Studies made plain that it was an unacceptable oversimplification to regard timbres as stable entities. Reinforced by his studies with Meyer-Eppler, beginning in 1955, Stockhausen formulated new "statistical" criteria for composition, focussing attention on the aleatoric, directional tendencies of sound movement, "the change from one state to another, with or without returning motion, as opposed to a fixed state". Stockhausen later wrote, describing this period in his compositional work, "The first revolution occurred from 1952/53 as musique concrète, electronic tape music, and space music, entailing composition with transformers, generators, modulators, magnetophones, etc; the integration of all concrete and abstract (synthetic) sound possibilities (also all noises), and the controlled projection of sound in space". His position as "the leading German composer of his generation" was established with Gesang der Jünglinge and three concurrently composed pieces in different media: Zeitmaße for five woodwinds, Gruppen for three orchestras, and Klavierstück XI. The principles underlying the latter three compositions are presented in Stockhausen's best-known theoretical article, "... wie die Zeit vergeht ..." ("... How Time Passes ..."), first published in 1957 in vol. 3 of Die Reihe.

His work with electronic music and its utter fixity led him to explore modes of instrumental and vocal music in which performers' individual capabilities and the circumstances of a particular performance (e.g., hall acoustics) may determine certain aspects of a composition. He called this "variable form". In other cases, a work may be presented from a number of different perspectives. In Zyklus (1959), for example, he began using graphic notation for instrumental music. The score is written so that the performance can start on any page, and it may be read upside down, or from right to left, as the performer chooses. Still other works permit different routes through the constituent parts. Stockhausen called both of these possibilities "polyvalent form", which may be either open form (essentially incomplete, pointing beyond its frame), as with Klavierstück XI (1956), or "closed form" (complete and self-contained) as with Momente (1962–64/69).

In many of his works, elements are played off against one another, simultaneously and successively: in Kontra-Punkte ("Against Points", 1952–53), which, in its revised form became his official "opus 1", a process leading from an initial "point" texture of isolated notes toward a florid, ornamental ending is opposed by a tendency from diversity (six timbres, dynamics, and durations) toward uniformity (timbre of solo piano, a nearly constant soft dynamic, and fairly even durations). In Gruppen (1955–57), fanfares and passages of varying speed (superimposed durations based on the harmonic series) are occasionally flung between three full orchestras, giving the impression of movement in space.

In his Kontakte for electronic sounds (optionally with piano and percussion) (1958–60), he achieved for the first time an isomorphism of the four parameters of pitch, duration, dynamics, and timbre.

=== 1960s ===
In 1960, Stockhausen returned to the composition of vocal music (for the first time since Gesang der Jünglinge) with Carré for four orchestras and four choirs. Two years later, he began an expansive cantata titled Momente (1962–64/69), for solo soprano, four choir groups and thirteen instrumentalists. In 1963, Stockhausen created Plus-Minus, "2 × 7 pages for realisation" containing basic note materials and a complex system of transformations to which those materials are to be subjected in order to produce an unlimited number of different compositions. Through the rest of the 1960s, he continued to explore such possibilities of "process composition" in works for live performance, such as Prozession (1967), Kurzwellen, and Spiral (both 1968), culminating in the verbally described "intuitive music" compositions of Aus den sieben Tagen (1968) and Für kommende Zeiten (1968–70). Some of his later works, such as Ylem (1972) and the first three parts of Herbstmusik (1974), also fall under this rubric. Several of these process compositions were featured in the all-day programmes presented at Expo 70, for which Stockhausen composed two more similar pieces, Pole for two players, and Expo for three. In other compositions, such as Stop for orchestra (1965), Adieu for wind quintet (1966), and the Dr. K Sextett, which was written in 1968–69 in honour of Alfred Kalmus of Universal Edition, he presented his performers with more restricted improvisational possibilities.

He pioneered live electronics in Mixtur (1964/67/2003) for orchestra and electronics, Mikrophonie I (1964) for tam-tam, two microphones, two filters with potentiometers (6 players), Mikrophonie II (1965) for choir, Hammond organ, and four ring modulators, and Solo for a melody instrument with feedback (1966). Improvisation also plays a part in all of these works, but especially in Solo. He also composed two electronic works for tape, Telemusik (1966) and Hymnen (1966–67). The latter also exists in a version with partially improvising soloists, and the third of its four "regions" in a version with orchestra. At this time, Stockhausen also began to incorporate pre-existent music from world traditions into his compositions. Telemusik was the first overt example of this trend.

In 1968, Stockhausen composed the vocal sextet Stimmung, for the Collegium Vocale Köln, an hour-long work based entirely on the overtones of a low B-flat. In the following year, he created Fresco for four orchestral groups, a Wandelmusik ("foyer music") composition. This was intended to be played for about five hours in the foyers and grounds of the Beethovenhalle auditorium complex in Bonn, before, after, and during a group of (in part simultaneous) concerts of his music in the auditoriums of the facility. The overall project was given the title Musik für die Beethovenhalle. This had precedents in two collective-composition seminar projects that Stockhausen gave at Darmstadt in 1967 and 1968: Ensemble and Musik für ein Haus, and would have successors in the "park music" composition for five spatially separated groups, Sternklang ("Star Sounds") of 1971, the orchestral work Trans, composed in the same year and the thirteen simultaneous "musical scenes for soloists and duets" titled Alphabet für Liège (1972).

=== Space music and Expo '70 ===
The German Pavilion at Expo '70 (the spherical auditorium is out of view to the right)

Since the mid-1950s, Stockhausen had been developing concepts of spatialization in his works, not only in electronic music, such as the 5-channel Gesang der Jünglinge (1955–56) and Telemusik (1966), and 4-channel Kontakte (1958–60) and Hymnen (1966–67). Instrumental/vocal works like Gruppen for three orchestras (1955–57) and Carré for four orchestras and four choirs (1959–60) also exhibit this trait. In lectures such as "Music in Space" from 1958, he called for new kinds of concert halls to be built, "suited to the requirements of spatial music". His idea was

a spherical space which is fitted all around with loudspeakers. In the middle of this spherical space a sound-permeable, transparent platform would be suspended for the listeners. They could hear music composed for such standardized spaces coming from above, from below and from all points of the compass.

In 1968, the West German government invited Stockhausen to collaborate on the German Pavilion at the 1970 World Fair in Osaka and to create a joint multimedia project for it with artist Otto Piene. Other collaborators on the project included the pavilion's architect, Fritz Bornemann, Fritz Winckel, director of the Electronic Music Studio at Technische Universität Berlin, and engineer Max Mengeringhausen. The pavilion theme was "gardens of music", in keeping with which Bornemann intended "planting" the exhibition halls beneath a broad lawn, with a connected auditorium "sprouting" above ground. Initially, Bornemann conceived this auditorium in the form of an amphitheatre, with a central orchestra podium and surrounding audience space. In the summer of 1968, Stockhausen met with Bornemann and persuaded him to change this conception to a spherical space with the audience in the centre, surrounded by loudspeaker groups in seven rings at different "latitudes" around the interior walls of the sphere.

Although Stockhausen and Piene's planned multimedia project, titled Hinab-Hinauf, was developed in detail, the World Fair committee rejected their concept as too extravagant and instead asked Stockhausen to present daily five-hour programs of his music. Stockhausen's works were performed for 5½ hours every day over a period of 183 days to a total audience of about a million listeners. According to Stockhausen's biographer, Michael Kurtz, "Many visitors felt the spherical auditorium to be an oasis of calm amidst the general hubbub, and after a while it became one of the main attractions of Expo 1970".

=== 1970s ===
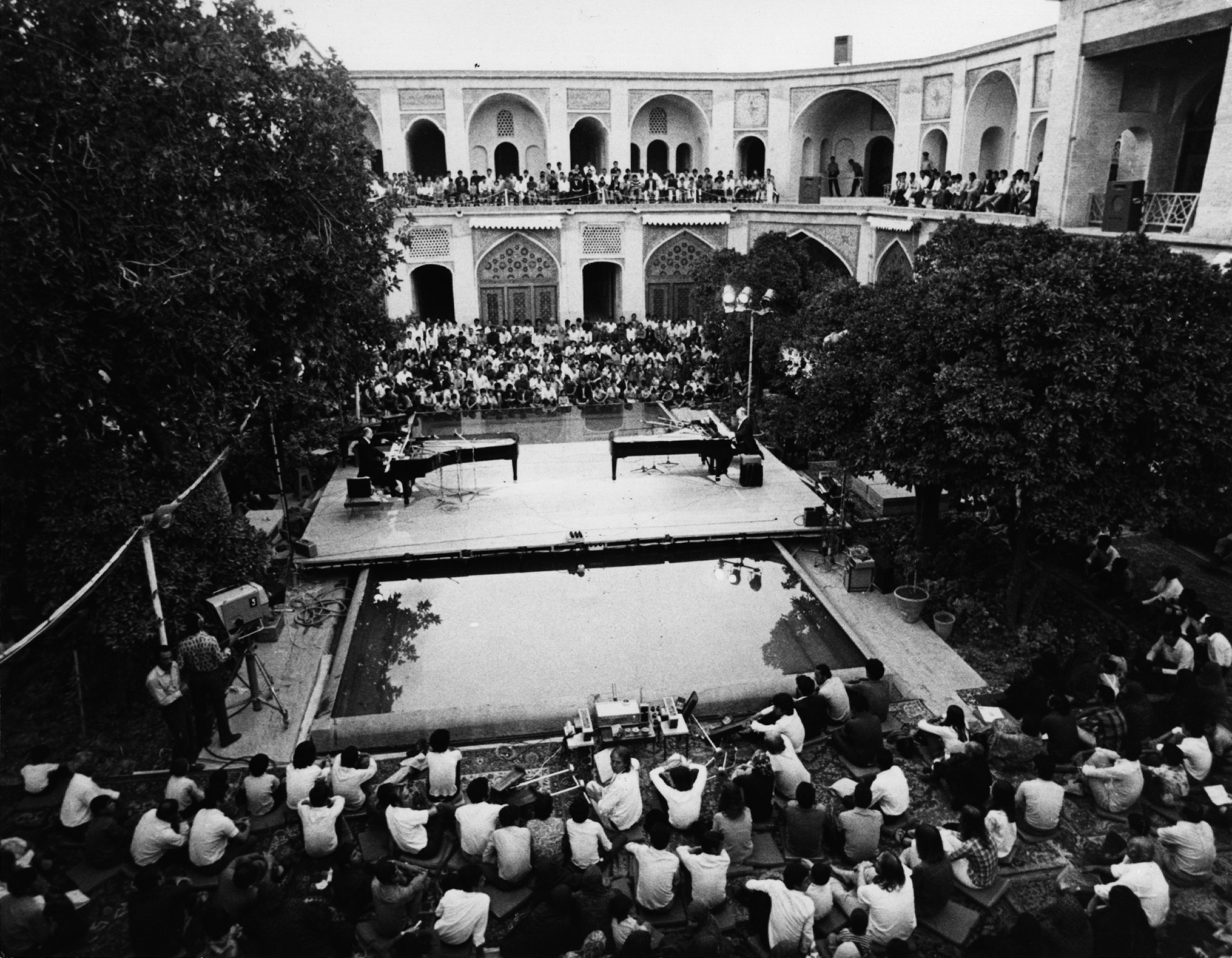
Stockhausen (front centre) at the mixing desk for a performance by Alfons and Aloys Kontarsky of Mantra, Shiraz Arts Festival, Iran, 1972

Beginning with Mantra for two pianos and electronics (1970), Stockhausen turned to formula composition, a technique which involves the projection and multiplication of a single, double, or triple melodic-line formula. Sometimes, as in Mantra and the large orchestral composition with mime soloists, Inori, the simple formula is stated at the outset as an introduction. He continued to use this technique (e.g., in the two related solo-clarinet pieces, Harlekin [Harlequin] and Der kleine Harlekin [The Little Harlequin] of 1975, and the orchestral Jubiläum [Jubilee] of 1977) through the completion of the opera-cycle Licht in 2003. Some works from the 1970s did not employ formula technique – e.g., the vocal duet "Am Himmel wandre ich" (In the Sky I am Walking, one of the 13 components of the multimedia Alphabet für Liège, 1972, which Stockhausen developed in conversation with the British biophysicist and lecturer on mystical aspects of sound vibration Jill Purce), "Laub und Regen" (Leaves and Rain, from the theatre piece Herbstmusik (1974), the unaccompanied-clarinet composition Amour, and the choral opera Atmen gibt das Leben (Breathing Gives Life, 1974/77) – but nevertheless share its simpler, melodically oriented style. Two such pieces, Tierkreis ("Zodiac", 1974–75) and In Freundschaft (In Friendship, 1977, a solo piece with versions for virtually every orchestral instrument), have become Stockhausen's most widely performed and recorded compositions.

This dramatic simplification of style provided a model for a new generation of German composers, loosely associated under the label neue Einfachheit or New Simplicity. The best-known of these composers is Wolfgang Rihm, who studied with Stockhausen in 1972–73. His orchestral composition Sub-Kontur (1974–75) quotes the formula of Stockhausen's Inori (1973–74), and he has also acknowledged the influence of Momente on this work.

Other large works by Stockhausen from this decade include the orchestral Trans (1971) and two music-theatre compositions utilizing the Tierkreis melodies: Musik im Bauch ("Music in the Belly") for six percussionists (1975), and the science-fiction "opera" Sirius (1975–77) for eight-channel electronic music with soprano, bass, trumpet, and bass clarinet, which has four different versions for the four seasons, each lasting over an hour and a half.

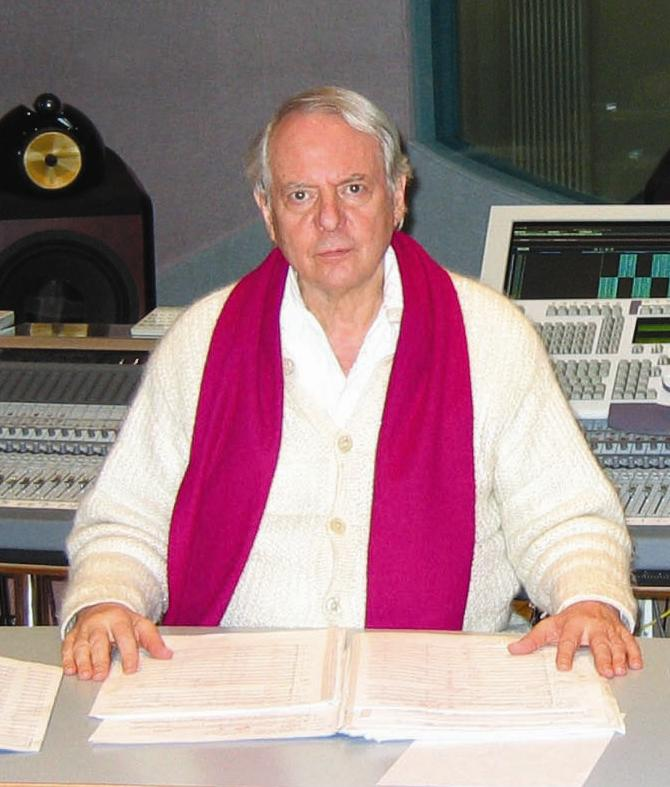
Stockhausen in 2004 during the mix-down of the recording of Angel Processions from Sonntag aus Licht, in Sound Studio N, Cologne

=== 1977–2003 ===
Between 1977 and 2003, Stockhausen composed seven operas in a cycle titled Licht: Die sieben Tage der Woche ("Light: The Seven Days of the Week"). The Licht cycle deals with the traits associated in various historical traditions with each weekday (Monday = birth and fertility, Tuesday = conflict and war, Wednesday = reconciliation and cooperation, Thursday = traveling and learning, etc.) and with the relationships between three archetypal characters: Michael, Lucifer, and Eve. Each of these characters dominates one of the operas (Donnerstag [Thursday], Samstag [Saturday], and Montag [Monday], respectively), the three possible pairings are foregrounded in three others, and the equal combination of all three is featured in Mittwoch (Wednesday).

Stockhausen's conception of opera was based significantly on ceremony and ritual, with influence from the Japanese Noh theatre, as well as Judeo-Christian and Vedic traditions. In 1968, at the time of the composition of Aus den sieben Tagen, Stockhausen had read a biography by Satprem about the Bengali guru Sri Aurobindo, and subsequently he also read many of the published writings by Aurobindo himself. The title of Licht owes something to Aurobindo's theory of "Agni" (the Hindu and Vedic fire deity). While Aurobindo derived this concept from the Vedas and Sankhya to describe the spiritual "Conscious-Force" or "Will" inherent in matter, he noted that it prefigured modern discoveries in physics regarding energy and matter. Stockhausen's definition of a formula and, especially, his conception of the Licht superformula, also owes a great deal to Sri Aurobindo's category of the "supramental", a unitary "Truth-Consciousness" which holds the "Real-Idea" or seed of the creation. Similarly, his approach to voice and text sometimes departed from traditional usage: Characters were as likely to be portrayed by instrumentalists or dancers as by singers, and a few parts of Licht (e.g., Luzifers Traum from Samstag, Welt-Parlament from Mittwoch, Lichter-Wasser and Hoch-Zeiten from Sonntag) use written or improvised texts in simulated or invented languages.

The seven operas were not composed in "weekday order" but rather starting (apart from Jahreslauf in 1977, which became the first act of Dienstag) with the "solo" operas and working toward the more complex ones: Donnerstag (1978–80), Samstag (1981–83), Montag (1984–88), Dienstag (1977/1987–91), Freitag (1991–94), Mittwoch (1995–97), and finally Sonntag (1998–2003).

Stockhausen had dreams of flying throughout his life, and these dreams are reflected in the Helikopter-Streichquartett (the third scene of Mittwoch aus Licht), completed in 1993. In it, the four members of a string quartet perform in four helicopters flying independent flight paths over the countryside near the concert hall. The sounds they play are mixed together with the sounds of the helicopters and played through speakers to the audience in the hall. Videos of the performers are also transmitted back to the concert hall. The performers are synchronized with the aid of a click track, transmitted to them and heard over headphones.

The first performance of the piece took place in Amsterdam on 26 June 1995, as part of the Holland Festival. Despite its extremely unusual nature, the piece has been given several performances, including one on 22 August 2003 as part of the Salzburg Festival to open the Hangar-7 venue, and the German première on 17 June 2007 in Braunschweig as part of the Stadt der Wissenschaft 2007 Festival. The work has also been recorded by the Arditti Quartet.

In 1999 he was invited by Walter Fink to be the ninth composer featured in the annual Komponistenporträt of the Rheingau Musik Festival.

In 1999, BBC producer Rodney Wilson asked Stockhausen to collaborate with Stephen and Timothy Quay on a film for the fourth series of Sound on Film International. Although Stockhausen's music had been used for films previously (most notably, parts of Hymnen in Nicolas Roeg's Walkabout in 1971), this was the first time he had been asked to provide music specially for the purpose. He adapted 21 minutes of material taken from his electronic music for Freitag aus Licht, calling the result Zwei Paare (Two Couples), and the Brothers Quay created their animated film, which they titled In Absentia, based only on their reactions to the music and the simple suggestion that a window might be an idea to use. When, at a preview screening, Stockhausen saw the film, which shows a madwoman writing letters from a bleak asylum cell, he was moved to tears. The Brothers Quay were astonished to learn that his mother had been "imprisoned by the Nazis in an asylum, where she later died. ... This was a very moving moment for us as well, especially because we had made the film without knowing any of this".

=== 2003–2007 ===
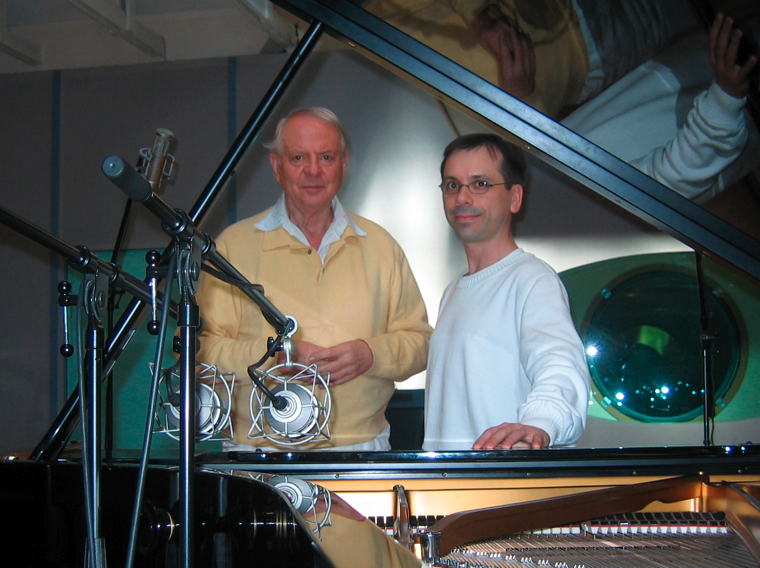
Stockhausen and Antonio Pérez Abellán during a recording session in 2007 for Natürliche Dauern, the Third Hour of Klang

After completing Licht, Stockhausen embarked on a new cycle of compositions based on the hours of the day, Klang ("Sound"). Twenty-one of these pieces were completed before Stockhausen's death. The first four works from this cycle are First Hour: Himmelfahrt (Ascension), for organ or synthesizer, soprano and tenor (2004–2005); Second Hour: Freude (Joy) for two harps (2005); Third Hour: Natürliche Dauern (Natural Durations) for piano (2005–2006); and Fourth Hour: Himmels-Tür (Heaven's Door) for a percussionist and a little girl (2005). The Fifth Hour, Harmonien (Harmonies), is a solo in three versions for flute, bass clarinet, and trumpet (2006). The Sixth through Twelfth hours are chamber-music works based on the material from the Fifth Hour. The Thirteenth Hour, Cosmic Pulses, is an electronic work made by superimposing 24 layers of sound, each having its own spatial motion, among eight loudspeakers placed around the concert hall. Hours 14 through 21 are solo pieces for bass voice, baritone voice, basset-horn, horn, tenor voice, soprano voice, soprano saxophone, and flute, respectively, each with electronic accompaniment of a different set of three layers from Cosmic Pulses. The twenty-one completed pieces were first performed together as a cycle at the Festival MusikTriennale Köln on 8–9 May 2010, in 176 individual concerts.

== Theories ==
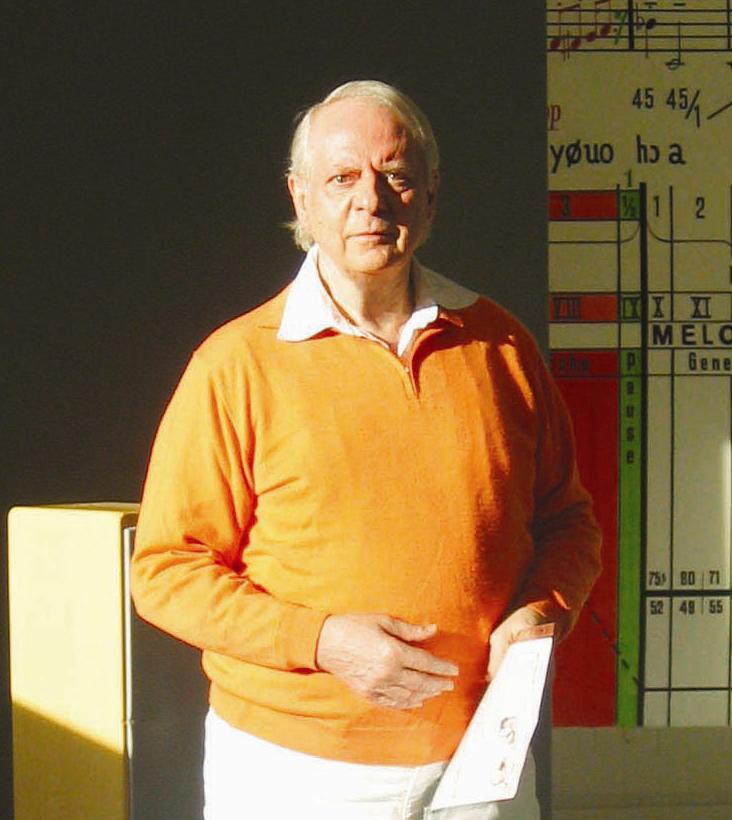
Stockhausen lecturing on Inori in 2005

In the 1950s and early 1960s, Stockhausen published a series of articles that established his importance in the area of music theory. Although these include analyses of music by Mozart, Debussy, Bartók, Stravinsky, Goeyvaerts, Boulez, Nono, Johannes Fritsch, Michael von Biel, and, especially, Webern, the items on compositional theory directly related to his own work are regarded as the most important generally. "Indeed, the Texte come closer than anything else currently available to providing a general compositional theory for the postwar period". His most celebrated article is "... wie die Zeit vergeht ..." ("... How Time Passes ..."), first published in the third volume of Die Reihe (1957). In it, he expounds a number of temporal conceptions underlying his instrumental compositions Zeitmaße, Gruppen, and Klavierstück XI. In particular, this article develops (1) a scale of twelve tempos analogous to the chromatic pitch scale, (2) a technique of building progressively smaller, integral subdivisions over a basic (fundamental) duration, analogous to the overtone series, (3) musical application of the concept of the partial field (time fields and field sizes) in both successive and simultaneous proportions, (4) methods of projecting large-scale form from a series of proportions, (5) the concept of "statistical" composition, (6) the concept of "action duration" and the associated "variable form", and (7) the notion of the "directionless temporal field" and with it, "polyvalent form".

Other important articles from this period include "Elektronische und Instrumentale Musik" ("Electronic and Instrumental Music", 1958), "Musik im Raum" ("Music in Space", 1958), "Musik und Graphik" ("Music and Graphics", 1959), "Momentform" (1960), "Die Einheit der musikalischen Zeit" ("The Unity of Musical Time", 1961), and "Erfindung und Entdeckung" ("Invention and Discovery", 1961), the last summing up the ideas developed up to 1961. Taken together, these temporal theories

suggested that the entire compositional structure could be conceived as "timbre": since "the different experienced components such as colour, harmony and melody, meter and rhythm, dynamics, and form correspond to the different segmental ranges of this unified time", the total musical result at any given compositional level is simply the "spectrum" of a more basic duration – i.e., its "timbre", perceived as the overall effect of the overtone structure of that duration, now taken to include not only the "rhythmic" subdivisions of the duration but also their relative "dynamic" strength, "envelope", etc.

...

Compositionally considered, this produced a change of focus from the individual tone to a whole complex of tones related to one another by virtue of their relation to a "fundamental" – a change that was probably the most important compositional development of the latter part of the 1950s, not only for Stockhausen's music but for "advanced" music in general.

Some of these ideas, considered from a purely theoretical point of view (divorced from their context as explanations of particular compositions) drew significant critical fire. For this reason, Stockhausen ceased publishing such articles for a number of years, as he felt that "many useless polemics" about these texts had arisen, and he preferred to concentrate his attention on composing.

Through the 1960s, although he taught and lectured publicly, Stockhausen published little of an analytical or theoretical nature. Only in 1970 did he again begin publishing theoretical articles, with "Kriterien", the abstract for his six seminar lectures for the Darmstädter Ferienkurse. The seminars themselves, covering seven topics ("Micro- and Macro-Continuum", "Collage and Metacollage", "Expansion of the Scale of Tempos", "Feedback", "Spectral Harmony – Formant Modulation", "Expansion of Dynamics –A Principle of Mikrophonie I", and "Space Music – Spatial Forming and Notation") were published only posthumously.

His collected writings were published in Texte zur Musik, including his compositional theories and analyses on music as a general phenomenon.

== Reception ==
=== Musical influence ===
Stockhausen has been described as "one of the great visionaries of 20th-century music". His two early Electronic Studies (especially the second) had a powerful influence on the subsequent development of electronic music in the 1950s and 1960s, particularly in the work of the Italian Franco Evangelisti and the Poles Andrzej Dobrowolski and Włodzimierz Kotoński. The influence of his Kontra-Punkte, Zeitmaße and Gruppen may be seen in the work of many composers, including Igor Stravinsky's Threni (1957–58) and Movements for piano and orchestra (1958–59) and other works up to the Variations: Aldous Huxley in Memoriam (1963–64), whose rhythms "are likely to have been inspired, at least in part, by certain passages from Stockhausen's Gruppen". Though music of Stockhausen's generation may seem an unlikely influence, Stravinsky said in a 1957 conversation:

I have all around me the spectacle of composers who, after their generation has had its decade of influence and fashion, seal themselves off from further development and from the next generation (as I say this, exceptions come to mind, Krenek, for instance). Of course, it requires greater effort to learn from one's juniors, and their manners are not invariably good. But when you are seventy-five and your generation has overlapped with four younger ones, it behooves you not to decide in advance "how far composers can go", but to try to discover whatever new thing it is makes the new generation new.

Amongst British composers, Sir Harrison Birtwistle readily acknowledges the influence of Stockhausen's Zeitmaße (especially on his two wind quintets, Refrains and Choruses and Five Distances) and Gruppen on his work more generally. Brian Ferneyhough says that, although the "technical and speculative innovations" of Klavierstücke I–IV, Kreuzspiel and Kontra-Punkte escaped him on first encounter, they nevertheless produced a "sharp emotion, the result of a beneficial shock engendered by their boldness" and provided "an important source of motivation (rather than of imitation) for my own investigations". While still in school, he became fascinated upon hearing the British première of Gruppen, and

listened many times to the recording of this performance, while trying to penetrate its secrets – how it always seemed to be about to explode, but managed nevertheless to escape unscathed in its core – but scarcely managed to grasp it. Retrospectively, it is clear that from this confusion was born my interest for the formal questions which remain until today.

Although it eventually evolved in a direction of its own, Ferneyhough's 1967 wind sextet, Prometheus, began as a wind quintet with cor anglais, stemming directly from an encounter with Stockhausen's Zeitmaße. With respect to Stockhausen's later work, he said,

I have never subscribed (whatever the inevitable personal distance) to the thesis according to which the many transformations of vocabulary characterizing Stockhausen's development are the obvious sign of his inability to carry out the early vision of strict order that he had in his youth. On the contrary, it seems to me that the constant reconsideration of his premises has led to the maintenance of a remarkably tough thread of historical consciousness which will become clearer with time. ... I doubt that there has been a single composer of the intervening generation who, even if for a short time, did not see the world of music differently thanks to the work of Stockhausen.

In a short essay describing Stockhausen's influence on his own work, Richard Barrett concludes that "Stockhausen remains the composer whose next work I look forward most to hearing, apart from myself of course" and names as works that have had particular impact on his musical thinking Mantra, Gruppen, Carré, Klavierstück X, Inori, and Jubiläum.

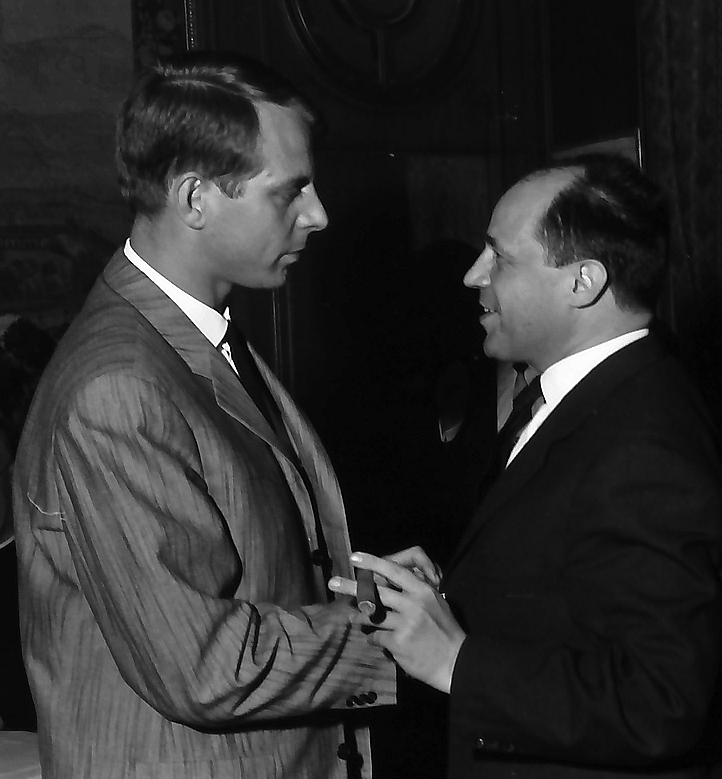
Stockhausen and Boulez, Donaueschingen Festival 1963

French composer and conductor Pierre Boulez once declared, "Stockhausen is the greatest living composer, and the only one whom I recognize as my peer". Boulez also acknowledged the influence of performing Stockhausen's Zeitmaße on his subsequent development as a conductor. Another French composer, Jean-Claude Éloy, regards Stockhausen as the most important composer of the second half of the 20th century, and cites virtually "all his catalog of works" as "a powerful discoveration [sic], and a true revelation".

Dutch composer Louis Andriessen acknowledged the influence of Stockhausen's Momente in his pivotal work Contra tempus of 1968. German composer Wolfgang Rihm, who studied with Stockhausen, was influenced by Momente, Hymnen, and Inori.

At the Cologne ISCM Festival in 1960, the Danish composer Per Nørgård heard Stockhausen's Kontakte as well as pieces by Kagel, Boulez, and Berio. He was profoundly affected by what he heard and his music suddenly changed into "a far more discontinuous and disjunct style, involving elements of strict organization in all parameters, some degree of aleatoricism and controlled improvisation, together with an interest in collage from other musics".

Jazz musicians such as Miles Davis, Charles Mingus, Herbie Hancock, Yusef Lateef, and Anthony Braxton cite Stockhausen as an influence.

Stockhausen was influential within pop and rock music as well. Frank Zappa acknowledges Stockhausen in the liner notes of Freak Out!, his 1966 debut with The Mothers of Invention. On the back of The Who's second LP released in the US, "Happy Jack", their primary composer and guitarist Pete Townshend, is said to have "an interest in Stockhausen". Rick Wright and Roger Waters of Pink Floyd also acknowledge Stockhausen as an influence. San Francisco psychedelic groups Jefferson Airplane and the Grateful Dead are said to have done the same; Stockhausen said that the Grateful Dead were "well orientated toward new music". Founding members of Cologne-based experimental band Can, Irmin Schmidt and Holger Czukay, both studied with Stockhausen at the Cologne Courses for New Music. German electronic pioneers Kraftwerk also say they studied with Stockhausen, and Icelandic vocalist Björk has acknowledged Stockhausen's influence.

=== Wider cultural renown ===
Stockhausen, along with John Cage, is one of the few avant-garde composers to have succeeded in penetrating the popular consciousness. The Beatles included his face on the cover of Sgt. Pepper's Lonely Hearts Club Band. In particular, "A Day in the Life" (1967) and "Revolution 9" (1968) were influenced by Stockhausen's electronic music. Perhaps the most caustic remark about Stockhausen was attributed to Sir Thomas Beecham. Asked, "Have you heard any Stockhausen?" he is alleged to have replied, "No, but I believe I have trodden in some".

Stockhausen's fame is also reflected in works of literature. For example, he is mentioned in Philip K. Dick's 1974 novel Flow My Tears, the Policeman Said, and in Thomas Pynchon's 1966 novel The Crying of Lot 49. The Pynchon novel features "The Scope", a bar with "a strict electronic music policy". Protagonist Oedipa Maas asks "a hip graybeard" about a "sudden chorus of whoops and yibbles" coming out of "a kind of jukebox". He replies, "That's by Stockhausen ... the early crowd tends to dig your Radio Cologne sound. Later on we really swing."

The French writer Michel Butor acknowledges that Stockhausen's music "taught me a lot", mentioning in particular the electronic works Gesang der Jünglinge and Hymnen.

Later in his life, Stockhausen was portrayed by at least one journalist, John O'Mahony of the Guardian newspaper, as an eccentric, for example being alleged to live an effectively polygamous lifestyle with two women, to whom O'Mahony referred as his "wives", while at the same time stating he was not married to either of them. In the same article, O'Mahony says Stockhausen said he was born on a planet orbiting the star Sirius. In the German newspaper Die Zeit, Stockhausen stated that he was educated at Sirius (see Sirius star system below).

In 1995, BBC Radio 3 sent Stockhausen a package of recordings from contemporary techno and ambient music artists Aphex Twin, Richie Hawtin (Plastikman), Scanner and Daniel Pemberton, and asked him for his opinion on the music. In August of that year, Radio 3 reporter Dick Witts interviewed Stockhausen about these pieces for a broadcast in October, called "The Technocrats" and asked what advice he would give these young musicians. Stockhausen made suggestions to each and they were then invited to respond. All but Plastikman obliged.

=== Critical reception ===
Robin Maconie finds that, "Compared to the work of his contemporaries, Stockhausen's music has a depth and rational integrity that is quite outstanding... His researches, initially guided by Meyer-Eppler, have a coherence unlike any other composer then or since". Maconie also compares Stockhausen to Beethoven: "If a genius is someone whose ideas survive all attempts at explanation, then by that definition Stockhausen is the nearest thing to Beethoven this century has produced. Reason? His music lasts", and "As Stravinsky said, one never thinks of Beethoven as a superb orchestrator because the quality of invention transcends mere craftsmanship. It is the same with Stockhausen: the intensity of imagination gives rise to musical impressions of an elemental and seemingly unfathomable beauty, arising from necessity rather than conscious design".

Christopher Ballantine, comparing the categories of experimental and avant-garde music, concludes that

Perhaps more than any other contemporary composer, Stockhausen exists at the point where the dialectic between experimental and avant-garde music becomes manifest; it is in him, more obviously than anywhere else, that these diverse approaches converge. This alone would seem to suggest his remarkable significance.

Igor Stravinsky expressed great, but not uncritical, enthusiasm for Stockhausen's music in the conversation books with Robert Craft, and for years organised private listening sessions with friends in his home where he played tapes of Stockhausen's latest works. In an interview published in March 1968, however, he says of an unidentified person,

I have been listening all week to the piano music of a composer now greatly esteemed for his ability to stay an hour or so ahead of his time, but I find the alternation of note-clumps and silences of which it consists more monotonous than the foursquares of the dullest eighteenth-century music.

The following October, a report in Sovetskaia Muzyka translated this sentence (and a few others from the same article) into Russian, substituting for the conjunction "but" the phrase "Ia imeiu v vidu Karlkheintsa Shtokkhauzena" ("I am referring to Karlheinz Stockhausen"). When this translation was quoted in Druskin's Stravinsky biography, the field was widened to all of Stockhausen's compositions and Druskin adds for good measure, "indeed, works he calls unnecessary, useless and uninteresting", again quoting from the same Sovetskaia Muzyka article, even though it had made plain that the characterization was of American "university composers".

=== Controversy ===
Throughout his career, Stockhausen excited controversy. Thomas Ulrich writes that Stockhausen's music displays high expectations about "shaping and transforming the world, about the truth of life and of reality, about the creative departure into a future determined by spirit", so that his work "like no other in the history of new music, has a polarizing effect, arouses passion, and provokes drastic opposition, even hatred". In reply to a question during an interview on the Bavarian Radio on 4 September 1960, reprinted as a foreword to his first collection of writings, Stockhausen said:

I have often been reproached – especially recently – for being too candid, and through this making not a few enemies for myself – being undiplomatic. ... It must be admitted: I am not gifted as an esotericist, not as a mystic or a hermit, and not as a diplomat; it corresponds that my love of my fellow humans expresses itself in candour ... I hope my enemies will not on this account destroy me; I also hope my enemies find forms of retort that I can find richly fanciful, witty, pertinent, instructive – that grant me respect through a noble and truly humane form of enmity.

After the student revolts in 1968, musical life in Germany became highly politicized, and Stockhausen found himself a target for criticism, especially from the leftist camp who wanted music "in the service of the class struggle". Among those critics were his former students Konrad Boehmer and Cornelius Cardew, who denounced his former teacher as a "servant of capitalism". Some critics held that Stockhausen was too elitist, while others complained he was too mystical.

==== Scandal at the Fresco premiere ====
As reported in the German magazine Der Spiegel, the première (and only performance to date) on 15 November 1969 of Stockhausen's work Fresco for four orchestral groups (playing in four different locations) was the scene of a scandal. The rehearsals were already marked by objections from the orchestral musicians questioning such directions as "glissandos no faster than one octave per minute" and others phoning the artists' union to clarify whether they really had to perform the Stockhausen work as part of the orchestra. In the backstage warm-up room at the premiere a hand-lettered sign could be seen saying: "We're playing, otherwise we would be fired". During the première the parts on some music stands suddenly were replaced by placards reading things like "Stockhausen-Zoo. Please don't feed", that someone had planted. Some musicians, fed up with the monkeyshines, left after an hour, though the performance was planned for four to five hours. Stockhausen fans protested, while Stockhausen foes were needling the musicians asking: "How can you possibly participate in such crap?" ("Wie könnt ihr bloß so eine Scheiße machen!"). At one point someone managed to switch off the stand lights, leaving the musicians in the dark. After 260 minutes the performance ended with no-one participating any longer.

==== Sirius star system ====
In an obituary in the German newspaper Die Zeit, Karlheinz Stockhausen was quoted as having said: "I was educated at Sirius and want to return to there, although I am still living in Kürten near Cologne." On hearing about this, conductor Michael Gielen stated: "When he said he knew what was happening at Sirius, I turned away from him in horror. I haven't listened to a note since." He called Stockhausen's statements "hubris" and "nonsense", while at the same time defending his own belief in astrology: "Why should these large celestial bodies exist if they do not stand for something? I cannot imagine that there is anything senseless in the universe. There is much we do not understand".

==== 11 September attacks ====
In a press conference in Hamburg on 16 September 2001, Stockhausen was asked by a journalist whether the characters in Licht were for him "merely some figures out of a common cultural history" or rather "material appearances". Stockhausen replied, "I pray daily to Michael, but not to Lucifer. I have renounced him. But he is very much present, like in New York recently." The same journalist then asked how the events of 11 September had affected him, and how he viewed reports of the attack in connection with the harmony of humanity represented in Hymnen. He answered:

Well, what happened there is, of course – now all of you must adjust your brains – the biggest work of art there has ever been. The fact that spirits achieve with one act something which we in music could never dream of, that people practise ten years madly, fanatically for a concert. And then die. [Hesitantly.] And that is the greatest work of art that exists for the whole Cosmos. Just imagine what happened there. There are people who are so concentrated on this single performance, and then five thousand people are driven to Resurrection. In one moment. I couldn't do that. Compared to that, we are nothing, as composers. [...] It is a crime, you know of course, because the people did not agree to it. They did not come to the "concert". That is obvious. And nobody had told them: "You could be killed in the process."

As a result of the reaction to the press report of Stockhausen's comments, a four-day festival of his work in Hamburg was cancelled. In addition, his pianist daughter announced to the press that she would no longer appear under the name "Stockhausen". In a subsequent message, he stated that the press had published "false, defamatory reports" about his comments, and said:

At the press conference in Hamburg, I was asked if Michael, Eve and Lucifer were historical figures of the past and I answered that they exist now, for example Lucifer in New York. In my work, I have defined Lucifer as the cosmic spirit of rebellion, of anarchy. He uses his high degree of intelligence to destroy creation. He does not know love. After further questions about the events in America, I said that such a plan appeared to be Lucifer's greatest work of art. Of course I used the designation "work of art" to mean the work of destruction personified in Lucifer. In the context of my other comments this was unequivocal.

== Honours ==
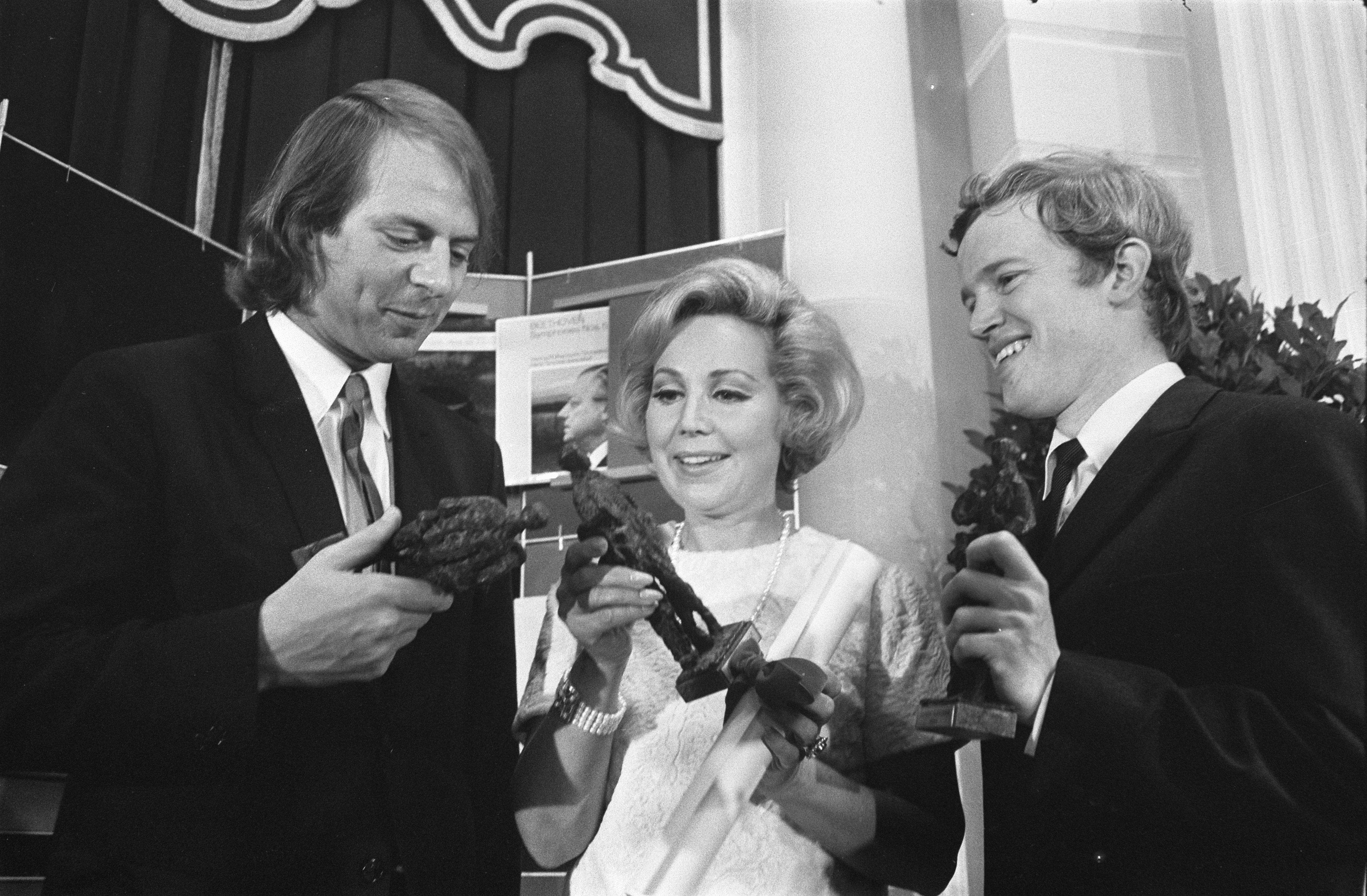
Stockhausen, Anneliese Rothenberger and Edo de Waart (1969)

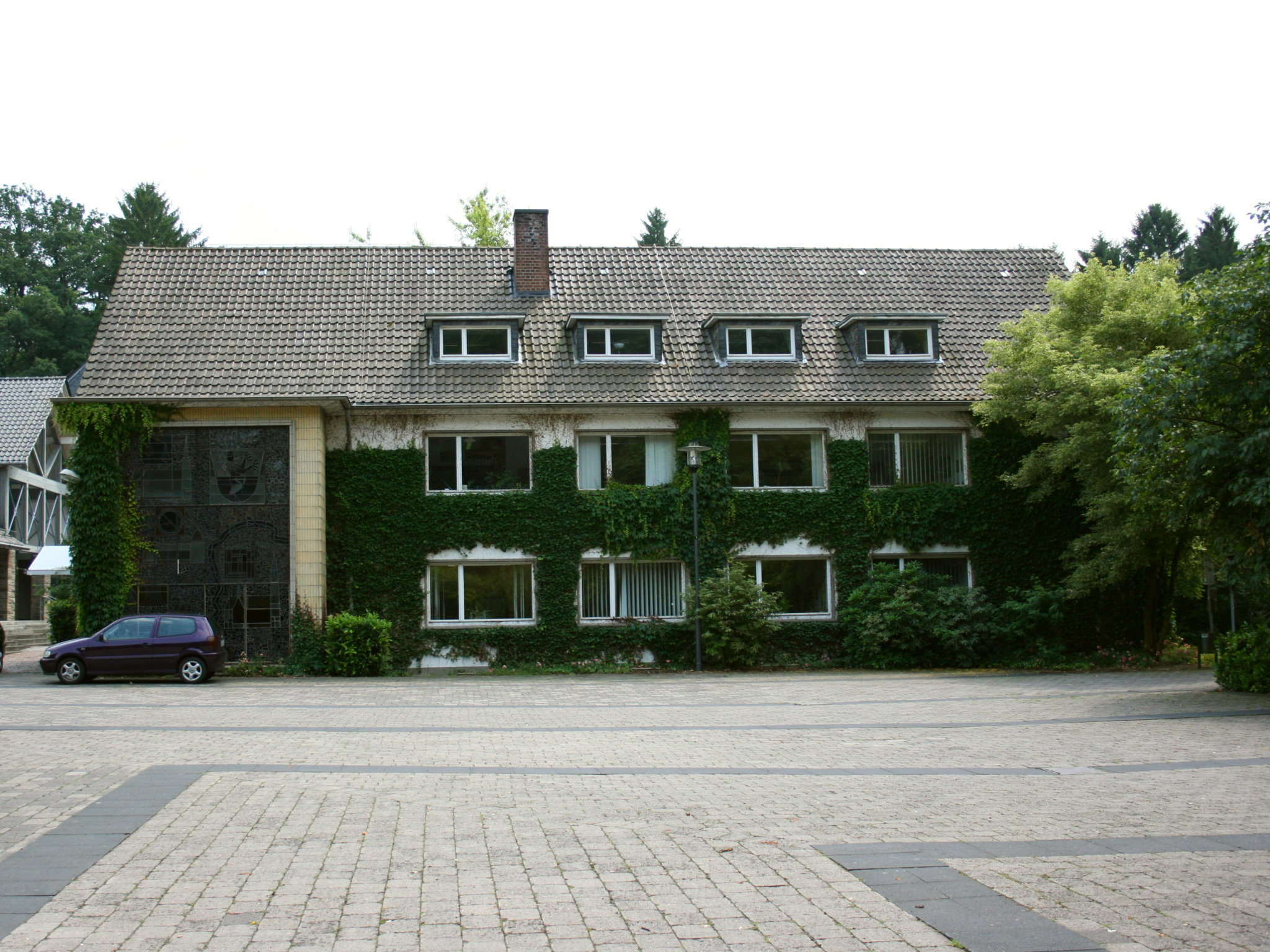
Karlheinz-Stockhausen-Platz and the Altes Rathaus in Kürten

Amongst the numerous honours and distinctions that were bestowed upon Stockhausen are:

- 1964 German gramophone critics award;
- 1966 and 1972 SIMC award for orchestral works (Italy);
- 1968 Grand Art Prize for Music of the State of North Rhine-Westphalia; Grand Prix du Disque (France); Member of the Free Academy of the Arts, Hamburg;
- 1968, 1969, and 1971 Edison Prize (Netherlands);
- 1970 Member of the Royal Swedish Academy of Music;
- 1973 Member of the Academy of Arts, Berlin;
- 1974 Federal Cross of Merit, 1st class (Germany);
- 1977 Member of the Philharmonic Academy of Rome;
- 1979 Honorary Member of the American Academy and Institute of Arts and Letters;
- 1980 Member of the European Academy of Science, Arts and Letters;
- 1981 Prize of the Italian music critics for Donnerstag aus Licht;
- 1982 German gramophone prize (German Phonograph Academy);
- 1983 Diapason d'or (France) for Donnerstag aus Licht;
- 1985 Commandeur de l'Ordre des Arts et des Lettres (France);
- 1986 Ernst von Siemens Music Prize;
- 1987 Honorary Member of the Royal Academy of Music, London;
- 1988 Honorary Citizen of the Kuerten community;
- 1989 Honorary Member of the American Academy of Arts and Sciences;
- 1990 Prix Ars Electronica, Linz, Austria;
- 1991 Honorary Fellow of the Royal Irish Academy of Music; Accademico Onorario of the Accademia Nazionale di Santa Caecilia, Rome; Honorary Patron of Sound Projects Weimar;
- 1992 IMC-UNESCO Picasso Medal; Distinguished Service Medal of the German state North Rhine-Westphalia; German Music Publishers Society Award for the score of Luzifers Tanz (3rd scene of Saturday from Light);
- 1993 Patron of the European Flute Festival; Diapason d'or for Klavierstücke I–XI and Mikrophonie I and II;
- 1994 German Music Publishers Society Award for the score Jahreslauf (Act 1 of Tuesday from Light);
- 1995 Honorary Member of the German Society for Electro-Acoustic Music; Bach Prize of the Free and Hanseatic City of Hamburg;
- 1996 Honorary doctorate (Dr. phil. h. c.) of the Free University of Berlin; Composer of the European Cultural Capital Copenhagen; Edison Prize (Netherlands) for Mantra; Member of the Free Academy of the Arts Leipzig; Honorary Member of the Leipzig Opera; Cologne Culture Prize;
- 1997 German Music Publishers Society Award for the score of Weltparlament (first scene of Wednesday from Light); Honorary member of the music ensemble LIM (Laboratorio de Interpretación Musical), Madrid;
- 1999 Entry in the Golden Book of the city of Cologne;
- 2000 German Music Publishers Society Award for the score of Evas Erstgeburt (act 1 of Monday from Light);
- 2000–2001 The film In Absentia made by the Quay Brothers (England) to concrete and electronic music by Karlheinz Stockhausen won the Golden Dove (first prize) at the International Festival for Animated Film in Leipzig. More awards: Special Jury Mention, Montreal, FCMM 2000; Special Jury Award, Tampere 2000; Special Mention, Golden Prague Awards 2001; Honorary Diploma Award, Cracow 2001; Best Animated Short Film, 50th Melbourne International Film Festival 2001; Grand Prix, Turku Finland 2001;
- 2001 German Music Publishers Society Award for the score Helicopter String Quartet (third scene of Wednesday from Light); Polar Music Prize of the Royal Swedish Academy of the Arts;
- 2002 Honorary Patron of the Sonic Arts Network, England;
- 2003 German Music Publishers Society Award for the score of Michaelion (4th scene of Wednesday from Light);
- 2004 Associated member of the Academie Royale des Sciences, des Lettres & des Beaux-arts (Belgium); Honorary doctorate (Dr. phil. h. c.) of the Queen's University in Belfast; German Music Publishers Society Award for the score of Stop and Start for 6 instrumental groups;
- 2005 German Music Publishers Society Award for the score of Hoch-Zeiten for choir (fifth scene of Sunday from Light);
- 2006 Honorary member of the Accademia Filarmonica di Bologna;
- 2008 On 22 August, Stockhausen's birthday, the Rathausplatz in his home town of Kürten was renamed Karlheinz-Stockhausen-Platz in his honour;
- 2008 On 10 October, the Studio for Electronic Music of the Royal Conservatory of The Hague in the Netherlands changed its name to Karlheinz Stockhausen Studio;
- 2009 German Music Publishers Society Award for the score of Momente for solo soprano, four choral groups, and 13 instrumentalists;
- 2010 The municipality of Kürten adopts the designation "Stockhausengemeinde" (Stockhausen municipality) in honour of the late composer.

== Documentary films ==
- Karlheinz Stockhausen: Helicopter String Quartet, documentary, The Netherlands, 1995, 78 min., producer: Ton van der Lee, director: Frank Scheffer, production: Allegri Film, streaming and DVD: Medici.tv. trailer
- Stockhausen – Musik für eine bessere Welt, documentary, Germany, 2009, 56 min., producer and director: Norbert Busè and co-director Thomas von Steinaecker, production: Studio.TV.Film, broadcast: Arte, ZDF.
