= Maurice Fleuret =

French music journalist (1932–1990)

Maurice Fleuret (French pronunciation: [mɔʁis flœʁɛ]; 22 June 1932 – 22 March 1990) was a French composer, music journalist, radio producer, arts administrator, and festival organizer. Working at the Ministry of Culture in the 1980s, he is best remembered as one of the initiators of the Fête de la Musique.

== Biography ==
Born in La Talaudière in the department of Loire, Maurice Fleuret received his secondary education at the École normale d'instituteurs in Montbrison. In 1952 he moved to Paris and began studying music in the classes of Norbert Dufourcq, Olivier Messiaen, and Roland Manuel at the Conservatoire de Paris, graduating in 1956.

In 1955, he became a lecturer of the Jeunesses musicales de France, a position he held until 1965. From 1974, he became artistic adviser to this same organization. In the meantime, he had undertaken other activities as well. In 1958 he edited the review Musique de tous les temps, from 1960 to 1964 he was director of the music division of the Centre National de Diffusion Culturelle, and in 1962 he began a career as a music critic, first for France observateur and then from 1964 for its successor, the Nouvel Observateur. In 1962 he also became a radio producer, first at ORTF and then at Radio France, where he had a regular weekly programme titled Événements-musique.

Obsessed by the desire "to understand contemporary music", he began his collaboration at the Nouvel Observateur by stating at the outset that he would not report "concerts where the three B's—Brahms, Bach, and Beethoven—are heard all night long". He wanted to "create a new musical criticism, a chronicle of introduction to contemporary music, and not one of reporting" that would "put everybody off".

But even if his articles had "as high a profile abroad as in France", he could not just criticize the ideas of others without trying to form his own. In 1967, he decided to abandon his lecturing to devote himself to entering into music in new environments. From 1967 to 1974, he organized the Journées de Musique Contemporaine de Paris (Days of Contemporary Music Paris), where he brought together some twenty thousand people in cycles devoted to composers such as Luciano Berio, Pierre Boulez, or Pierre Henry.

Although his primary interest was in contemporary music, he was also very active as an ethnomusicologist, making over thirty journeys to Africa and Asia, and in particular doing field work in West Africa in 1966 and 1967. He also organized many concerts of traditional African and Asian music in Europe.

He directed with the same success enterprises as diverse as the Stockhausen Festival in Shiraz-Persepolis in 1972 or the Xenakis Festival in Bonn in 1974. The producer from 1974 of a weekly magazine (Events-Music) on the radio, three years later he gave up his position at the Musée d'Art Moderne de la Ville de Paris—which he had held since 1967—to dedicate himself to the Festival of Lille where Pierre Mauroy had been mayor since 1973.

When the Socialists came to power under François Mitterrand in 1981, Mauroy became Prime Minister, and Fleuret was appointed director of music and dance at the Ministry of Culture headed by Jack Lang. In this post, he promoted the creation of music festivals, increased subsidies of all kinds, and vigorously defended the major projects of the president: the construction of the Opera Bastille, and the Cité de La Villette. After the conservatives came to power in March 1986, he remained for some months in order to protect the president's projects, but gave up his position in September. Even after the Socialists returned to power under Mitterrand in May 1988 he stubbornly refused to resume the post of director of music.

He preferred from that time to concern himself with the Gustav Mahler Music Library, which he had founded in 1986 with Henry-Louis de La Grange based on their personal collections. This was the first private music library in France, with twenty thousand volumes, nine thousand scores, two thousand five hundred files on composers and contemporary artists, forty thousand recordings, especially records amount of money bringing invaluable and unpublished music from the preceding century and a half, constantly enriched with new gifts. While still at the helm since 1988 of the collection "Music" of Publishing Bernard Coutaz, he died in Paris on 22 March 1990.

== Writings ==
- 1962. Musique hongroise. France-Hongrie, numéro spécial 74–75.
- 1978. Xenakis: 78: introduction, biographie, catalogue des oeuvres, discographie, bibliographie, statistiques et documents. [Paris]: Salabert. Second edition, 1981.
- 1981. Régards sur Iannis Xenakis. Paris: Stock.
- 1984. Claude Ballif: compositeur de l'été ... : réalisé à l'occasion du Festival estival de Paris, 1984. La Revue Musicale, nos. 370–71. Paris: La Revue Musicale.
- 1989. Joseph Kosma, 1905–1969: un homme, un musicien. La Revue Musicale, nos. 412–15. Paris: La Revue Musicale.
- 1992. Chroniques pour la musique d'aujourd'hui, preface by Jean Daniel. Arles (Bouches-du-Rhône): Editions Bernard Coutaz. ISBN 2-87712-049-X. [Collection of analyses of fifty-four musicians, selected from the journalistic output of Maurice Fleuret.]
