= List of compositions by Karlheinz Stockhausen =

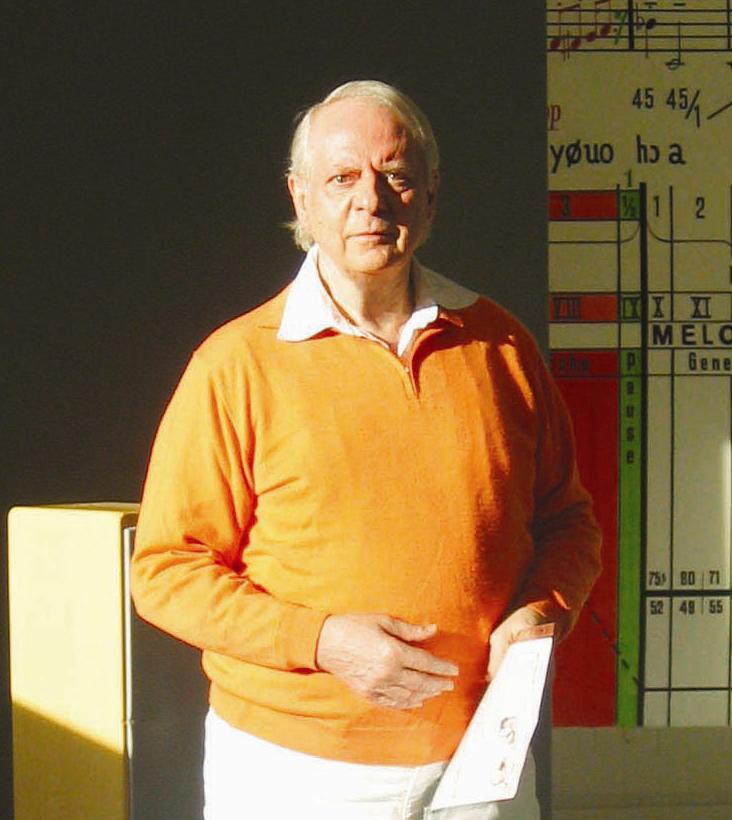
Karlheinz Stockhausen in 2005

A list of compositions by Karlheinz Stockhausen (alphabetical by title—a link to a chronological list is given at the end).

== A ==
- Adieu, for wind quintet (flute, oboe, clarinet, bassoon, and horn), Nr. 21 (1966)
- Alphabet für Liège ("Alphabet for Liège"), Nr. 36 (1972)
  - Am Himmel wandre ich ("In the Sky I Am Walking", American Indian Songs), Nr. 36 1/2 (1972)
- Amour, 5 pieces for clarinet, Nr. 44 (1976)
  - Amour, for flute, Nr. 44 1/2 (1976/81)
  - "Vier Sterne" ("Four Stars") from Amour, for cello, Nr. 44 2/3 (1976/98)
  - Amour, for saxophone, Nr. 44 3/4 (1976/2003)
- Atmen gibt das Leben ("Breathing Gives Life"), choral opera with orchestra (or orchestra on tape), Nr. 39 (1974/77)
- Aus den sieben Tagen ("From the Seven Days"), 15 texts for intuitive music (performable separately), Nr. 26 (1968)
1. Richtige Dauern ("Right Durations"), for circa 4 players
2. Unbegrenzt ("Unlimited"), for ensemble
3. Verbindung ("Connection"), for ensemble
4. Treffpunkt ("Meeting Point"), for ensemble
5. Nachtmusik ("Night Music"), for ensemble
6. Abwärts ("Downward"), for ensemble
7. Aufwärts ("Upward"), for ensemble
8. Oben und Unten ("Above and Below"), theatre piece for a man, a woman, and a child, with 4 instrumentalists
9. Intensität ("Intensity"), for ensemble
10. Setz die Segel zur Sonne ("Set Sail for the Sun"), for ensemble
11. Kommunion ("Communion"), for ensemble
12. Litanei ("Litany"), for speaker or speaking choir [Cf. Litanei 97, below]
13. Es ("It"), for ensemble
14. Goldstaub ("Gold Dust"), for ensemble
15. Ankunft ("Arrival"), for speaker or speaking choir
- Ave, for basset horn and alto flute (1984–85)

== B ==
- Balance, for flute, English horn, and bass clarinet (2006–07). See: Klang: Seventh Hour
- Bassetsu, for basset-horn, 2. ex Nr. 70 (1997). Arranged from Mittwoch aus Licht, scene 4: Michaelion, Nr. 70
- Bassetsu-Trio, for basset horn, trumpet, and trombone, 3. ex Nr. 70 (1997). Arranged from Mittwoch aus Licht, scene 4: Michaelion

== C ==
- Carré ("Square"), for 4 choirs and orchestras, Nr. 10 (1959–60)
- Choral ("Wer uns trug mit Schmerzen in dies Leben" ["Who bore us with pain into this life"]), for a cappella choir, Nr. 1/9 (1950)
- Chöre für Doris ("Choruses for Doris"), for a cappella choir, Nr. ^{1}/_{11} (1950)
- Cosmic Pulses, electronic music. See: Klang: Thirteenth Hour

== D ==
- Dienstag aus Licht (see: Licht, below)
- Dr K–Sextett, for flute, bass clarinet, percussionist (tubular chimes and vibraphone), piano, viola, and cello, Nr. 28 (1968–69)
- Donnerstag aus Licht (see: Licht, below)
- Drachenkampf ("Dragon Fight"), for trumpet, trombone, percussion and synthesizer player, 1. ex 50 1/2, from Festival, scene 1 of act 3 (Michaels Heimkehr) of Donnerstag aus Licht (1980/87)
- Drei Lieder ("Three Songs"), for alto voice and chamber orchestra, Nr. ^{1}/_{10} (1950)

== E ==
- Entführung ("Abduction"), for piccolo solo, or for soprano saxophone and electronic and concrete music, 1. ex Nr. 58 2/3, from Montag aus Licht (1986)
- Erwachen ("Awakening"), for soprano saxophone, trumpet, and cello (2007). See: Klang: Twelfth Hour
- Elufa for basset-horn, flute / electronic music ad lib., 9. ex Nr. 64 (1991)
- Ensemble, group-composition project, with twelve other composers, not assigned a work number (1967)
- Etude, musique concrète, Nr. 1/5 (1952)
- Europa-Gruss ("Europe Greeting"), for winds and synthesizers, Nr. 72 (1992/2002)
- Expo, for 3 players or singers with 3 short-wave receivers, Nr. 31 (1969–70)
- Electronic Music with Sound Scenes of Friday from Light, (1991–94)

== F ==
- Flautina, for flute with piccolo and alto flute, ex Nr. 56 1/2 (1989)
- Freia, for flute ex 9 1/2 Nr. 64 (1991)
- Formel ("Formula"), for small orchestra, Nr. 1/6 (1951)
- Fresco, for 4 orchestral groups, Nr. 29 (1969)
- Freitag aus Licht (see: Licht, below)
- Freude ("Joy"), for two harps. See: Klang: Second Hour
- Für kommende Zeiten ("For Times to Come"), 17 texts for intuitive music, Nr. 33 (1968–70)
1. Übereinstimmung ("Unanimity"), for ensemble
2. Verlängerung ("Elongation")
3. Verkürzung ("Shortening")
4. Über die Grenze ("Across the Boundary"), for small ensemble
5. Kommunikation ("Communication"), for small ensemble
6. Intervall ("Interval"), for piano four-hands
7. Außerhalb ("Outside'), for small ensemble
8. Innerhalb ("Inside"), for small ensemble
9. Anhalt ("Halt"), for small ensemble
10. Schwingung ("Vibration"), for ensemble
11. Spektren ("Spectra"), for small ensemble
12. Wellen ("Waves"), for ensemble
13. Zugvogel ("Bird of Passage"), for ensemble
14. Vorahnung ("Presentiment"), for 4–7 interpreters
15. Japan, for ensemble
16. Wach ("Awake"), for ensemble
17. Ceylon, for small ensemble

== G ==
- Gesang der Jünglinge ("Song of the Youths"), electronic and concrete music, Nr. 8 (1955–56)
- Geburts-Fest ("Festival of Birth"), choir music with sound scenes for choir a cappella and tape, ex Nr. 56, from act 1 of Montag aus Licht (1987)
- Glück ("Bliss"), for oboe, English horn, and bassoon (2007). See: Klang: Eighth Hour
- Gruppen ("Groups"), for 3 orchestras, Nr. 6 (1955–57)

== H ==
- Halt, for trumpet in B-flat and double-bass (1978/83), from Michaels Reise um die Erde
- Harlekin ("Harlequin"), for clarinet, Nr. 42 (1975)
  - Der kleine Harlekin ("The Little Harlequin"), for clarinet, Nr. 42 1/2 (1975)
- Harmonien ("Harmonies"), see: Klang: Fifth Hour
- Helikopter-Streichquartett ("Helicopter String Quartet"), for string quartet and 4 helicopters, Nr. 69 (1992–93) [Scene 3 of Mittwoch aus Licht]
- Herbstmusik ("Autumn Music"), musical theatre for 4 performers, Nr. 40 (1974)
  - Laub und Regen ("Leaves and Rain"), duet for clarinet and viola, Nr. 40 1/2
- Himmelfahrt ("Ascension"), see: Klang: First Hour
- Himmels-Tür ("Heaven's Door"), see: Klang: Fourth Hour
- Hoffnung ("Hope"), for violin, viola, and cello (2007). See: Klang: Ninth Hour
- Hymnen ("Anthems"), 4-channel electronic and concrete music, Nr. 22 (1966–67)
  - Hymnen, electronic and concrete music with soloists, Nr. 22 1/2 (1966–67)
  - Hymnen, (Third Region) with orchestra, Nr. 22 2/3 (1969)

== I ==
- In Freundschaft ("In Friendship"), for clarinet, Nr. 46 (1977)
  - In Freundschaft, for flute, Nr. 46 1/2
  - In Freundschaft, for oboe, Nr. 46 2/3
  - In Freundschaft, for bassoon, Nr. 46 3/4
  - In Freundschaft, for bassett-horn or bass clarinet, Nr. 46^{4}/_{5}
  - In Freundschaft, for violin, Nr. 46^{5}/_{6}
  - In Freundschaft, for viola, Nr. 46^{6}/_{7}
  - In Freundschaft, for violoncello or double bass, Nr. 46^{7}/_{8}
  - In Freundschaft, for saxophone, Nr. 46^{9}/_{10}
  - In Freundschaft, for trumpet in E-flat (with fourth-attachment), Nr. 46^{10}/_{11}
  - In Freundschaft, for horn, Nr. 46^{11}/_{12}
  - In Freundschaft, for trombone, Nr. 46^{12}/_{13}
  - In Freundschaft, for tuba, Nr. 46^{13}/_{14}
  - In Freundschaft, for recorder, Nr. 46^{14}/_{15}
- Inori: Adorations for One or Two Soloists with Orchestra, Nr. 38 (1973–74)
  - Vortrag über HU ("Lecture on HU"), musical analysis of Inori, for a singer, Nr. 38 1/2 (1974)

== J ==
- Jubiläum ("Jubilee"), for orchestra, Nr. 45 (1977)

== K ==
- Katikati, for flute, Nr. 85.2 extra (2006)
- Der Kinderfänger (The Pied Piper) with Entführung (Abduction), scenes 2 and 3 from Evas Zauber (act 3 of Montag aus Licht) (1986), two versions:
  - Nr. 58 2/3, for alto flute with piccolo, children's choir, modern orchestra (3 synthesizer players, percussionist, and tape), with basset-horn ad lib.
  - Nr. 58 2/3 ossia, as either a solo for alto flute with piccolo, two synthesizer players, one percussionist, and tape, or a solo for alto flute with piccolo and tape
- Kinntanz ("Chin Dance"), 10. ex Nr. 53, from Luzifers Tanz, scene 3 from Samstag aus Licht (1983), 2 versions:
  - for euphonium, one percussionist, one synthesizer player (1 transmitter, 6 microphones, 2 × 2 loudspeakers, mixing desk and sound projectionist), or
  - euphonium, one percussionist, alto trombone, tenor horns (or baritones), and tubas (1 transmitter, 6 microphones, 2 × 2 loudspeakers, mixing desk and sound projectionist)
- Klang ("Sound", the 24 Hours of the Day), Nr. 81–101 (2004–2007)
  - First Hour: Himmelfahrt (Ascension), for organ (or synthesizer), soprano, and tenor, Nr. 81 (2004–05)
  - Second Hour: Freude (Joy), for 2 harps, Nr. 82 (2005)
  - Third Hour: Natürliche Dauern 1–24 (Natural Durations 1–24), for piano, Nr. 83 (2005–06)
  - Fourth Hour: Himmels-Tur (Heaven's Door), for a percussionist and a little girl, Nr. 84 (2005)
  - Fifth Hour: Harmonien (Harmonies), Nr. 85, versions for:
    - bass clarinet, Nr. 85.1 (2006)
    - flute, Nr. 85.2 (2006)
    - trumpet, Nr. 85.3 (2006)
  - Sixth Hour: Schönheit (Beauty), for flute, bass clarinet, and trumpet, Nr. 86 (2006)
  - Seventh Hour: Balance, for flute, English horn, and bass clarinet, Nr. 87 (2007)
  - Eighth Hour: Glück (Bliss), for oboe, English horn, and bassoon, Nr. 88 (2007)
  - Ninth Hour: Hoffnung (Hope), for violin, viola, and cello, Nr. 89 (2007)
  - Tenth Hour: Glanz (Brilliance), for oboe, clarinet, bassoon, trumpet, trombone, tuba, and viola, Nr. 90 (2007)
  - Eleventh Hour: Treue (Fidelity), for E-flat clarinet, basset horn, and bass clarinet, Nr. 91 (2007)
  - Twelfth Hour: Erwachen (Awakening), for soprano saxophone, trumpet, and cello, Nr. 92 (2007)
  - Thirteenth Hour: Cosmic Pulses, electronic music, Nr. 93 (2006–07)
  - Fourteenth Hour: Havona, for bass voice and electronic music, Nr. 94 (2007)
  - Fifteenth Hour: Orvonton, for baritone and electronic music, Nr. 95 (2007)
  - Sixteenth Hour: Uversa, for basset-horn and electronic music, Nr. 96 (2007)
  - Seventeenth Hour: Nebadon, for horn and electronic music, Nr. 97 (2007)
  - Eighteenth Hour: Jerusem, for tenor and electronic music, Nr. 98 (2007)
  - Nineteenth Hour: Urantia, for soprano and electronic music, Nr. 99 (2007)
  - Twentieth Hour: Edentia, for soprano saxophone and electronic music, Nr. 100 (2007)
  - Twenty-first Hour: Paradies (Paradise), for flute and electronic music, Nr. 101 (2007)
- Klavierstücke ("Piano Pieces")
  - Klavierstücke I–IV, Nr. 2 (1952)
  - Klavierstücke V–X, Nr. 4 (1954–55/61)
  - Klavierstück XI, Nr. 7 (1956)
  - Klavierstück XII, ex Nr. 49 3/4 (1979/83)
  - Klavierstück XIII, Nr. 51 1/2 (1981)
  - Klavierstück XIV, ex Nr. 57 2/3 (1984)
  - Synthi-Fou (Klavierstück XV), ex Nr. 61 2/3
  - Klavierstück XVI, Nr. 63 1/2 (1995)
  - Klavierstück XVII, 7 1/2 ex Nr. 64 (1994/99)
  - Klavierstück XVIII, Nr. 73 2/3 (2004)
  - Klavierstück XIX, Nr. 80 (2001/2003)
- Knabenduett ("Boys' Duet"), for 2 soprano saxophones, 2. ex Nr. 50 1/2, from Festival, scene 1 of act 3 of Donnerstag aus Licht (1980)
- Komet ("Comet"), version for a percussionist, electronic and concrete music, sound projectionist, 7 2/3 ex Nr. 64 (1994/99)
- Komet als Klavierstück XVII, for electronic piano (synthesizer), electronic and concrete music, sound projectionist, 7 1/2 ex Nr. 64 (1994/99) (see: Klavierstücke)
- Kontakte ("Contacts"), for electronic sounds, Nr. 12 (1958–60)
  - Kontakte, for electronic sounds, piano, and percussion, Nr. 12 1/2 (1958–60)
  - Originale ("Originals"), musical theatre with Kontakte, Nr. 12 2/3 (1961)
- Kontra-Punkte ("Counter-Points"), for 10 instruments, Nr. 1 (1952–53)
- Kreuzspiel ("Crossplay"), for oboe, bass clarinet, piano, and 3 percussionists, Nr. 1/7 (1951)
- Kurzwellen ("Short Waves"), for 6 players with live electronics, plus sound director, Nr. 25 (1968)

== L ==
- Licht ("Light"), Nr. 47–80 (1977–2003)
  - Jahreslauf ("Course of the Years"), Nr. 47 (1977/91)
  - Donnerstag aus Licht ("Thursday from Light"), opera in three acts, a greeting, and a farewell, Nr. 48–50 (1978–80)
    - Michaels Reise um die Erde ("Michael's Journey Round the Earth"), Nr. 48 (1978)
    - Donnerstags-Gruß ("Thursday's Greeting"), Nr. 48 1/2 (1978)
    - Michaels Jugend ("Michael's Youth"), Nr. 49 (1978–79)
      - Kindheit ("Childhood"), Nr. 49 1/2 (1979)
      - Mondeva, Nr. 49 2/3 (1978–79)
      - Examen ("Examination"), Nr. 49 3/4 (1979)
    - Michaels Heimkehr ("Michael's Homecoming"), Nr. 50 (1980)
      - Festival, Nr. 50 1/2
      - Vision, Nr. 50 2/3
    - Donnerstags-Abschied ("Thursday's Farewell"), Nr. 50 3/4 (1980)
  - Samstag aus Licht ("Saturday from Light"), opera in a greeting and four scenes, Nr. 51–54 (1981–84)
    - Luzifers Traum ("Lucifer's Dream"), Nr. 51 (1981)
    - Kathinkas Gesang als Luzifers Requiem ("Kathinka's Chant as Lucifer's Requiem"), Nr. 52 (1982–83)
    - Luzifers Tanz ("Lucifer's Dance"), Nr. 53 (1983)
    - Samstags-Gruss ("Saturday's Greeting"), Nr. 53 1/2 (1984)
    - Luzifers Abschied ("Lucifer's Farewell"), Nr. 54 (1982)
  - Montag aus Licht ("Monday from Light"), opera in three acts, a greeting, and a farewell, Nr. 55–59 (1984–88)
    - Montags-Gruß (Evas-Gruss), for multiple basset-horns and electronic keyboard instruments, Nr. 55 (1986/88)
    - Evas Erstgeburt, Nr. 56 (1987)
    - Evas Zweitgeburt, Nr. 57 (1984–87)
    - Evas Zauber, Nr. 58 (1984–86)
    - Montags-Abschied, Nr. 59 (1986/88)
  - Dienstag aus Licht, opera in a greeting and two acts (with a farewell), Nr. 47, 60–61 (1977/87–91)
    - Dienstags-Gruß, Nr. 60 (1987–88)
    - Jahreslauf vom Dienstag, Nr. 47 (1977/91)
    - Invasion-Explosion mit Abschied, Nr. 61 (1990–91)
  - Freitag aus Licht, opera in a greeting, two acts, and a farewell, Nr. 62–64 (1991–94)
    - Freitags-Gruss and Freitags-Abschied (concert title: Weltraum ("Outer Space"), electronic music, Nr. 62 (1991/92/94)
    - Paare vom Freitag, Nr. 63 (1992/99)
    - Freitag-Versuchung, Nr. 64 (1991–94)
  - Mittwoch aus Licht ("Wednesday from Light"), opera in a greeting, four scenes, and a farewell, Nr. 65–71 (1995–98)
    - Mittwochs-Gruss ("Wednesday's Greeting"), Nr. 65 (1998)
    - Welt-Parlament ("World Parliament"), Nr. 66 (1995)
    - Orchester-Finalisten ("Orchestra Finalists"), Nr. 68 (1995–96)
    - Helikopter-Streichquartett ("Helicopter String Quartet"), Nr. 69 (1992–93)
    - Michaelion, Nr. 70 (1997)
    - Mittwochs-Abschied ("Wednesday's Farewell"), Nr. 71 (1996)
  - Sonntag aus Licht ("Sunday from Light"), Nr. 75–80 (1998–2003)
    - Lichter-Wasser ("Lights-Waters"), Nr. 75 (1998–99)
    - Engel-Prozessionen ("Angel Processions"), Nr. 76 (2000)
    - Licht-Bilder ("Light-Pictures"), Nr. 77 (2002)
    - Düfte-Zeichen ("Scents-Signs"), Nr. 78 (2002)
    - Hoch-Zeiten ("High-Times"), Nr. 79 (2001–2002)
    - Sonntags-Abschied ("Sunday's Farewell"), Nr. 80 (2001/2003)
- Licht-Ruf ("Light Call"), for trumpet, basset horn, and trombone, or other instruments, Nr. 67 (1995)
- Linker Augenbrauentanz ("Left-Eyebrow Dance"), for flutes and basset horn(s), one percussionist, and one synthesizer player, 1. ex Nr. 53, from Luzifers Tanz, scene 3 of Samstag aus Licht (1983)
- Linker Augentanz ("Left-Eye Dance") for saxophones, synthesizer and percussion, 3. ex Nr. 53, from Luzifers Tanz, scene 3 of Samstag aus Licht (1983/90)
- Litanei 97 ("Litany 97"), for choir with conductor, Nr. 74 (1997)

== M ==
- Mantra, for 2 pianists (with wood blocks and antique cymbals) and electronics, Nr. 32 (1970)
- Menschen, hört ("Mankind, Hear"), for vocal sextet (SSATBB, with 6 microphones, 6 or 2 × 2 loudspeakers, mixing desk and sound projectionist), 4. ex Nr. 70, from Michaelion, scene 4 from Mittwoch aus Licht (1997)
- Mikrophonie I, for tamtam (2 players), 2 microphones, 2 filters with potentiometers, and 4 pair of loudspeakers, Nr. 15 (1964)
- Mikrophonie II, for 12 voices, Hammond organ (or synthesizer), 4 ring modulators, and tape, Nr. 17 (1965)
- Mittwoch aus Licht (see: Licht, above)
- Mittwoch-Formel ("Wednesday Formula"), Nr. 73 1/2, for percussion trio (2004)
- Mixtur ("Mixture"), for orchestra, 4 sinewave generators, and 4 ring-modulators, Nr. 16 (1964)
  - Mixtur, version for small orchestra, Nr. 16 1/2 (1964/67)
  - Mixtur 2003, for 5 instrumental groups, 4 sinewave-generator players, 4 sound mixers with 4 ring modulators, and sound director, Nr. 16 2/3 (1964/67/2003)
- Momente ("Moments"), for soprano solo, 4 choirs, and 13 instrumentalists, Nr. 13 (1962–64/69)
- Montag aus Licht (see: Licht, above)
- Musik für ein Haus, group-composition project, with fourteen other composers, not assigned a work number (1968)
- Musik im Bauch ("Music in the Belly"), for 6 percussionists and music boxes, Nr. 41 (1975)

== N ==
- Nasenflügeltanz ("Wing-of-the-Nose Dance"), for solo percussionist, or for percussionist with a synthesizer player, 7. ex Nr. 53, from Luzifers Tanz, scene 3 of Samstag aus Licht (1983)
- Natürliche Dauern ("Natural Durations"), for piano. See: Klang: Third Hour

== O ==
- Oberlippentanz ("Upper-Lip Dance"), for piccolo trumpet, trombone or euphonium, 4 or 8 horns, 2 percussionists (with 2 transmitters, 10 microphones, 2 × 2 loudspeakers, mixing desk and sound projectionist), or as solo for piccolo trumpet 8. ex Nr. 53, cadenza from Luzifers Tanz, scene 3 from Samstag aus Licht (1983)
- Oktophonie ("Octophony"), electronic music of Dienstag aus Licht, 1. ex Nr. 61 (1990/91)
- Originale ("Originals"), musical theatre, Nr. 12 2/3 (1961) [Cf. Kontakte, above]

== P ==
- Paare vom Freitag ("Couples of Friday") with soprano, bass, electronic instruments (tape) Nr. 63 (1992/99)
- Pietà, for flugelhorn and electronic music, or for flugelhorn, soprano, and electronic music, Nr. 61 1/2, from act 2 of Dienstag aus Licht (1990/91)
- Plus-Minus, 2 x 7 pages for realization, Nr. 14 (1963)
- Pole ("Poles"), for 2 players or singers with 2 short-wave radios, Nr. 30 (1969–70)
- Prozession ("Procession"), for 6 players with live electronics, Nr. 23 (1967)
- Punkte ("Points"), for orchestra, Nr. 1/2 (1952/62/66/93)

== Q ==
- Quitt ("Even"), for alto flute, clarinet, and trumpet, 1. ex Nr. 59 (1989)

== R ==
- Rechter Augenbrauentanz ("Right-Eyebrow Dance"), for clarinets, bass clarinet(s), one percussionist, and one synthesizer player (with c. 8 microphones, 2 × 2 loudspeakers, mixing desk, and sound projectionist), 2. ex Nr. 53, from Luzifers Tanz, scene 3 of Samstag aus Licht (1983/2003)
- Rechter Augentanz ("Right-Eye Dance"), for oboes, cor anglais, bassoons, one percussionist, and one synthesizer player, 4. ex Nr. 53, from Luzifers Tanz, scene 3 of Samstag aus Licht (1983)
- Rechter Backentanz ("Right-Cheek Dance"), for trumpets, trombones, one percussionist, and one synthesizer player, 6. ex Nr. 53, from Luzifers Tanz, scene 3 of Samstag aus Licht (1983)
- Refrain, for piano (+ 3 woodblocks), vibraphone (+ 3 alpine cowbells and keyboard glockenspiel), and celesta (+ 3 antique cymbals), Nr. 11 (1959)
  - 3 x Refrain 2000, for sampler-celesta (+ 3 antique cymbals), piano (+ 3 woodblocks), vibraphone (+ 3 alpine cowbells and keyboard glockenspiel), and sound director, Nr. 11 1/2 (2000)
- Rotary Wind Quintet, for flute, oboe, clarinet, bassoon, and horn, Nr. 70 1/2 (1997)

== S ==
- Samstag aus Licht (see: Licht, above)
- Saxophon (aus Jahreslauf), for soprano saxophone and bongo, or soprano saxophone alone, 2. ex Nr. 47, (1977) from Dienstag aus Licht
- Schlagtrio ("Percussive Trio") [originally Schlagquartett], for piano and 2 x 3 [originally 3 x 2] timpani, Nr. 1/3 (1952)
- Schönheit ("Beauty"), for flute, bass clarinet, and trumpet (2006–2007). See: Klang: Sixth Hour
- Signale zur Invasion ("Signals to Invasion"), for trombone and electronic music or for trombone alone, 2. ex Nr. 61, from Dienstag aus Licht (1992)
- Sirius, electronic music with trumpet, soprano, bass clarinet, and bass voice, Nr. 43 (1975–77)
  - Sirius, electronic music alone, four versions:
    - Spring version, 1. ex Nr. 43
    - Summer version, 2. ex Nr. 43
    - Fall version, 3. ex Nr. 43
    - Winter version, 4. ex Nr. 43
  - Aries, for trumpet and electronic music, Nr. 43 1/2 (1977/80)
  - Libra, for bass clarinet and electronic music, Nr. 43 2/3 (1977)
  - Capricorn, for bass and electronic music, Nr. 43 3/4 (1977)
- Solo, for a melody instrument and feedback (live electronics with 4 technicians, 4 pair of loudspeakers), Nr. 19 (1965–66)
- Sonatine, for violin and piano, Nr. 1/8 (1951)
- Sonntag aus Licht (see: Licht, above)
- Spiel ("Play"), for orchestra, Nr. 1/4 (1952)
- Spiral, for a soloist with short-wave receiver and live electronics with sound director, Nr. 27 (1968)
- Sternklang ("Star Sound"), park music for five groups, Nr. 34 (1971)
- Stimmung ("Tuning"), for 6 vocalists, Nr. 24 (1968)
  - Stimmung "Paris Version", for 6 vocalists, 6 microphones, 6 loudspeakers, and sound director, Nr. 24 1/2 (1968)
- Stop, for small orchestra in 6 groups, Nr. 18 (1965)
  - Stop, "Paris Version", Nr. 18 1/2 (1969)
  - Stop und Start, for 6 instrumental groups, Nr. 18 2/3 (2001)
- Strahlen ("Rays"), for a percussionist and ten-channel sound recording, Nr. 80 1/2 (2002)
- Studie I ("Study I"), electronic music, Nr. 3/I (1953)
- Studie II ("Study II"), electronic music, Nr. 3/II (1954)
- Sukat, for alto flute and basset-horn, 2. ex Nr. 60 (1989)

== T ==
- Telemusik, electronic and concrete music, Nr. 20 (1966)
- Thinki, for flute, 1. ex Nr. 70 (1997)
- Tierkreis ("Zodiac"), 12 melodies of the star signs, for a melody and/or chording instrument, Nr. 41 1/2 (1974–75)
  - Tierkreis, for high soprano or high tenor, Nr. 41 2/3
  - Tierkreis, for soprano or tenor, Nr. 41 3/4
  - Tierkreis, for mezzo-soprano or alto or low tenor, Nr. 41 4/5
  - Tierkreis, for baritone, Nr. 41 5/6
  - Tierkreis, for bass, Nr. 41^{6}/_{7}
  - Tierkreis, for chamber orchestra, Nr. 41 ^{7}/_{8} (1974/77)
  - Tierkreis, for clarinet and piano, Nr. 41 ^{8}/_{9} (1974/81)
  - Tierkreis, trio version, Nr. 41 ^{9}/_{10} (1974/83)
  - Tierkreis, 2003 version, for tenor or soprano and chordal instrument, Nr. 41 ^{10}/_{11} (1974/2003)
  - Fünf Sternzeichen, for orchestra, Nr. 41 ^{11}/_{12} (1974/2004)
  - Fünf weitere Sternzeichen, for orchestra, Nr. 41 ^{12}/_{13} (1974/2007)
    - Taurus, for bassoon, 1. ex Nr. 41 ^{12}/_{13} (1974/2007)
    - Taurus-Quintett, for tuba, trumpet, bassoon, horn, and trombone, 2. ex Nr. 41 ^{12}/_{13} (1974/2007)
- Trans, for orchestra and tape, Nr. 35 (1971)
- Traum-Formel ("Dream Formula"), for basset-horn, Nr. 51 2/3 (1981)
- Treue ("Fidelity"), for E♭ clarinet, basset horn, and bass clarinet (2007). See: Klang: Eleventh Hour
- Trumpetent (or Trompetent), for 4 trumpeters, Nr. 73 (1995)
- Türin, for door (German: Tür), rin, and speaker (versions in German and English), with electronics, Nr. 84 extra (2006)
- Two Couples, electronic and concrete music, Nr. 63 2/3 (1992/99)

== U ==
- Unsichtbare Chöre ("Invisible Choirs"), 16-channel recording of a cappella choir, for 8-channel playback, ex Nr. 79 (1979)

== V ==
- Vibra-Elufa, for vibraphone, 9 3/4 ex Nr. 64 (2003)

== W ==
- Weltraum ("Outer Space"), electronic music, Nr. 62 (1991–92/94) see: Licht: Freitags-Gruss and Freitags-Abschied, above.
- Wochenkreis ("Cycle of the Week"), for basset-horn and electronic keyboard instruments, 2. ex Nr. 57 3/4 (1986/88)

== X ==
- Xi, for a melody instrument with microtones, 1. ex Nr. 55 (1986)
  - Xi, version for basset horn, 2. ex Nr. 55 (1986)
  - Xi, version for alto flute or flute, 3. ex Nr. 55 (1986)

== Y ==
- Ylem, for 19 players, Nr. 37 (1972)
- Ypsilon, for a melody instrument with microtones, 2. ex Nr. 59 (1989)
  - Ypsilon, version for basset-horn, 3. ex Nr. 59 (1989)
  - Ypsilon, version for flute, 4. ex Nr. 59 (1989)

== Z ==
- Zeitmaße ("Time Measures"), for oboe, flute, cor anglais, clarinet, and bassoon, Nr. 5 (1955–56)
- Zungenspitzentanz ("Tip-of-the-Tongue Dance") for piccolo flute, dancer (optional) 2 euphoniums or synthesizer, 1 percussionist (optional) (plus 1 transmitter, 5 microphones, 2 x 2 loudspeakers, mixing desk and sound projectionist), or as piccolo solo, 9. ex Nr. 53, from Luzifers Tanz, scene 3 of Samstag aus Licht (1983)
- Zyklus ("Cycle"), for a percussionist, Nr. 9 (1959)
