= Formula composition =

Musical composition technique

Formula composition is a serially derived technique encountered principally in the music of Karlheinz Stockhausen, involving the projection, expansion, and Ausmultiplikation of either a single melody-formula, or a two- or three-voice contrapuntal construction (sometimes stated at the outset).

In contrast to serial music, where the structuring features are more or less abstract and remain largely inaccessible to the listener's ear, in formula composition the musical specifications of pitch, dynamics, duration, timbre, and tempo are always directly evident in the sound, through the use of a concisely articulated melodic tone succession, the formula, which defines the large-scale form as well as all the internal musical details of the composition.

== Stockhausen's music ==
Though foreshadowed in Stockhausen's once-withdrawn Formel ("Formula") of 1951, the technique made its first appearance in Mantra in 1970, and became the central focus of Stockhausen's music up to 2003. Stockhausen's mammoth opera cycle Licht is based on a three-strand "super-formula".

Hermann Conen identifies two kinds of formula composition in Stockhausen's works prior to Licht:

formula compositions in which the form results from projection of the formula, ... [and] works in which melodies in themselves possess many internal characteristics of formulas, but where the formal idea itself does not originate from the formula(s) used in their realisation

Works of the first type include Mantra (1970), Inori (1973–74), Jubiläum (1977), and In Freundschaft (1977); works of the second type comprise Alphabet für Liège (1972), the “Laub und Regen” duet from Herbstmusik (1974), Musik im Bauch (1975), Harlekin (1975), Der kleine Harlekin (1975), and Sirius (1975–77). Other works from the 1970s, such as Sternklang (1971), Trans (1971), Ylem (1972), the first three parts of Herbstmusik, Atmen gibt das Leben (1974/76–77), Tierkreis (1974–75), and Amour (1976) do not employ formula technique, according to Conen, though the composer includes Atmen gibt das Leben amongst the works composed using "formula complexes".

== Other composers ==
Pierre Boulez describes his composition Rituel in memoriam Bruno Maderna (1975) as a "ceremony of memory", based on "numerous repetitions of the same formulas", and it has been seen as an analogue to Stockhausen's formula compositions—especially to Inori, because of the shared ritual character of the two compositions.

York Höller, who studied with Stockhausen in 1971–72, uses a similar method, which he names Klanggestalt (literally, "sound-shape"), and at least one writer has used the expression "formula composition" to describe it. Finbar O'Súilleabháin, however, while accepting there are parallels between the techniques in Höller's opera Der Meister und Margarita (1984–85) and Stockhausen's Licht cycle (1977–2003), concludes that Höller's conception is "perfectly distinct".

== See also ==
- Melodic formula
