= Amour (Stockhausen) =

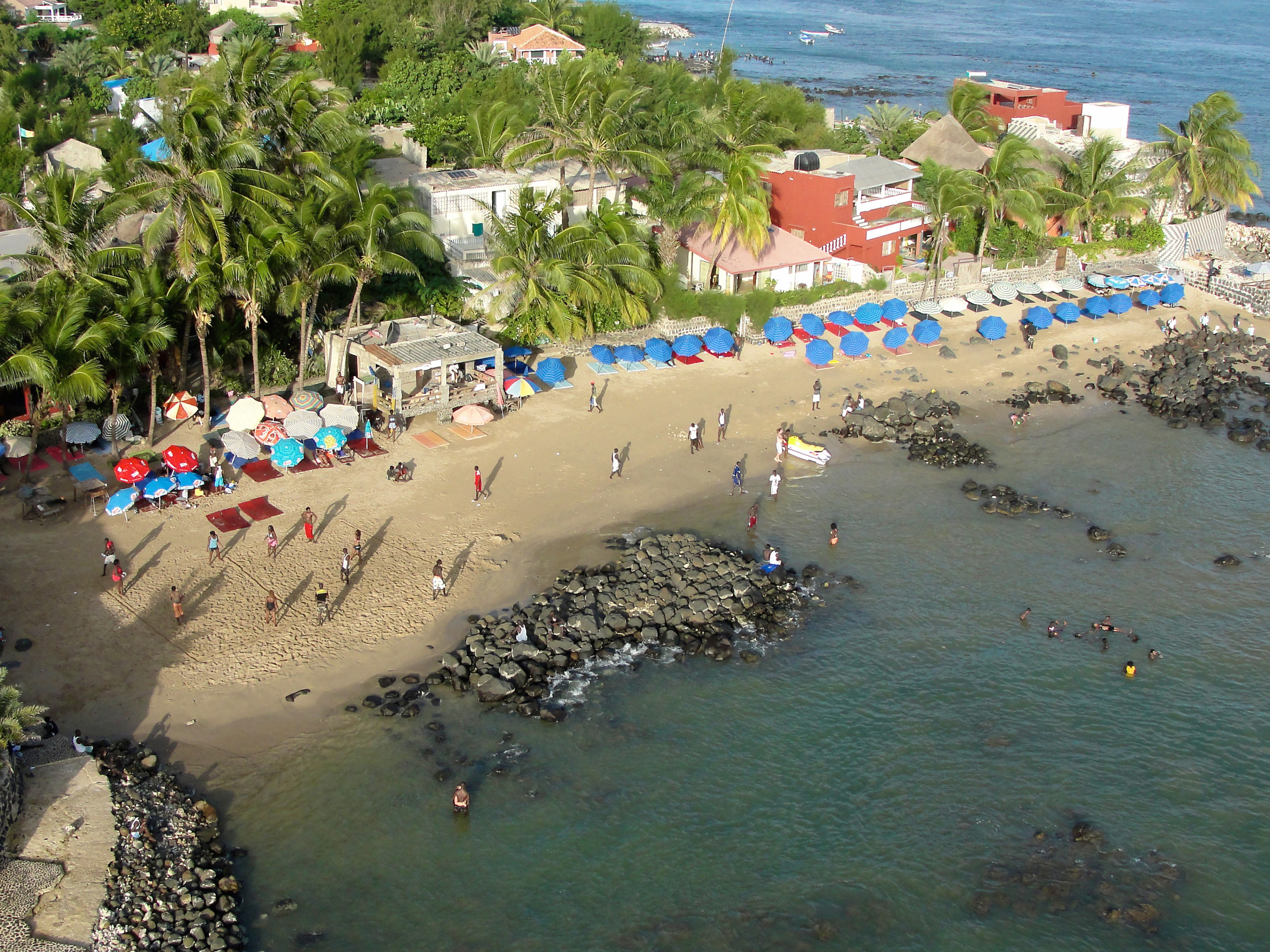
Beach at Ngor, Senegal, where Stockhausen first began composing Amour in 1974.

Amour is a cycle of five pieces for clarinet by Karlheinz Stockhausen, composed in 1974–76. The composer thought of each piece as a gift for a close friend. The cycle is given the number 44 in Stockhausen's catalogue of works.

== History ==
The first piece of the cycle was composed in 1974 while Stockhausen was vacationing in Senegal, at Ngor, a beach resort near Dakar; the rest were composed during a week in December 1976, in Kürten, Germany, as Christmas gifts for family members and close associates.

- "Sei wieder fröhlich" ("Cheer up", 12 December 1974)

Composed for clarinetist Suzee (Suzanne) Stephens, who worked with Stockhausen on a number of projects, including Herbstmusik (1974), Harlekin (1975), In Freundschaft (1977), Traum-Formel (1981), and others. This is a short (the score indicates approximate playing time of 1'30"), melodic work.

- "Dein Engel wacht über Dir" ("Your angel is watching over you", 11 December 1976)

Composed for Mary Bauermeister, the composer's second wife. This piece was conceived by Stockhausen as a dialogue between two voices: one low and soft, the other loud, two octaves higher. The voices unite into a single entity, which is then transformed several times.

- "Die Schmetterlinge spielen" ("The butterflies are playing", 16 December 1976)

Composed for Jaynee Stephens, Suzanne's younger sister. This is a character piece in which the butterflies are represented by short, fast two-note motifs. One of the butterflies has, in the composer's words, "a beat of wide intervals in triplets", and the other's wings move in "fast duplets of small intervals".

- "Ein Vöglein singt an Deinem Fenster" ("A little bird is singing at your window", 12 December 1976)

Composed for Suzanne Stephens. This also is a character piece, which begins with a "bird" melody—fast, wide intervals, trills—which gradually transforms into a calmer, unadorned "human" melody.

- "Vier Sterne weisen Dir den Weg" ("Four stars show you the way", 13 December 1976)

Composed for Doris Stockhausen-Andreae, the composer's first wife. The title refers to the four children Doris and Karlheinz had: Suja, Christel, Markus, and Majella. There are, accordingly, four related, four-note formulas in the piece, which are gradually transformed in various ways.

Amour was first performed publicly on 9 January 1978, in Stuttgart, by Suzanne Stephens. In 1981 Stockhausen created a flute version of the cycle, which was followed by a cello arrangement of "Vier Sterne weisen Dir den Weg" in 1998, and a saxophone version of the entire cycle, created in 2003.
