= Stop (Stockhausen) =

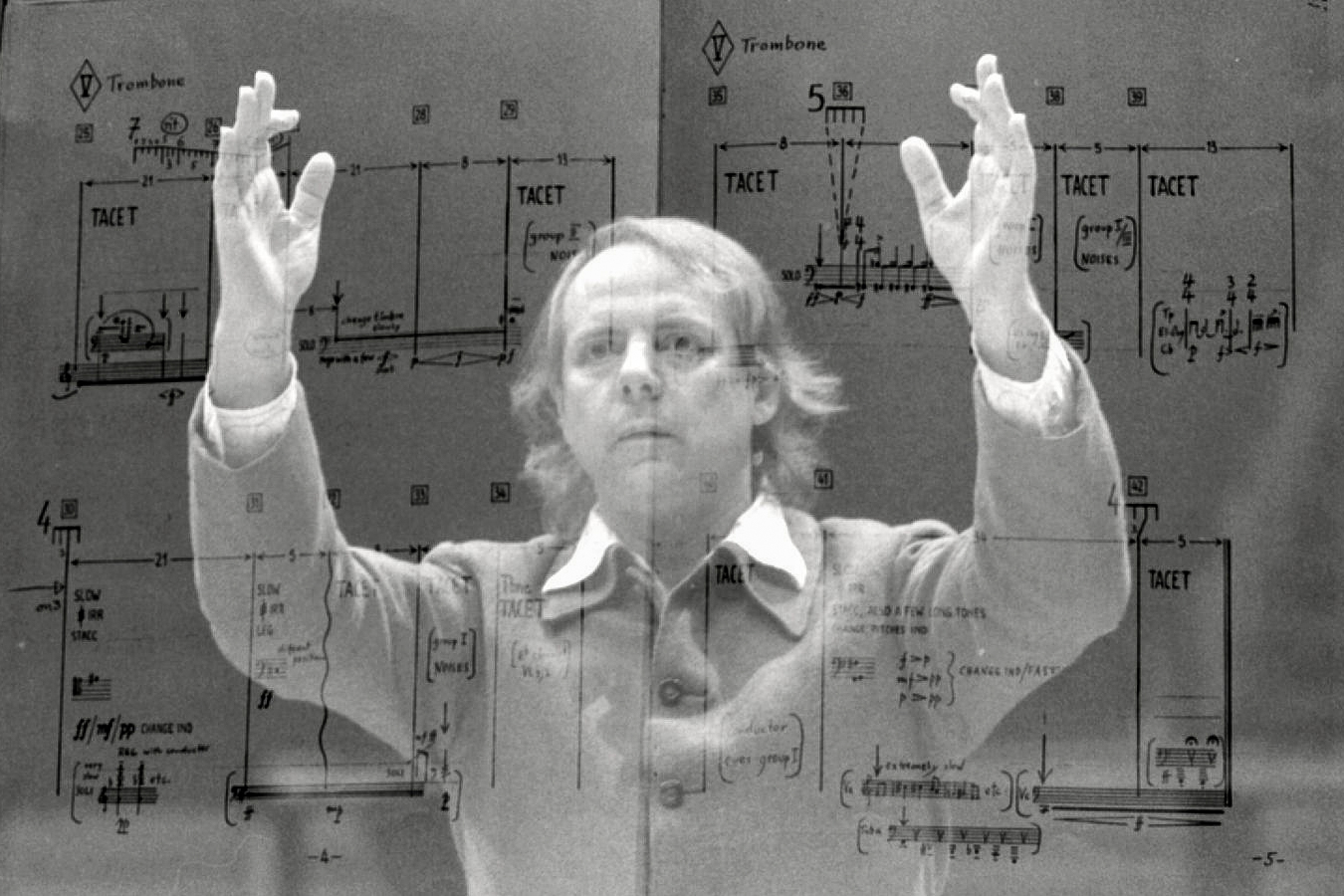
Stockhausen conducting in 1980, superimposed on a page from Stop

Stop is a composition for orchestra (divided into six groups) by Karlheinz Stockhausen, work-number 18 in the composer’s catalogue of works, where two performing realisations are also found as Nr. 18 1/2 and Nr. 18 2/3.

== History ==
Stop is a work of about 20 minutes duration, written in a single session at the blackboard in 1965 during a composition seminar at the Cologne Courses for New Music 1964–65, in response to a request from a student for a demonstration of the process of creating a work, including "precise details". The instrumentation is flexible, and an organic process binding the whole together must also be developed from the basic score to make a version before it can be performed. The title stems from the fact that, from time to time, noises or coloured silences stop these processes of unfolding of groups of pitches. In addition to the original score, two performing versions made by the composer have been published: a "Paris Version" for nineteen instruments, Nr. 18 1/2 (1969), and Stop und Start (Stop and Start) for six instrumental groups (twelve performers) (2001) Nr. 18 2/3. The altered title of the 2001 version simply reflects the fact that a new sound group starts up after each interruption. The "Paris Version" was that of the world premiere, given on 2 June 1969 under the baton of Diego Masson in the Théâtre National Populaire, Palais de Chaillot, as part of the fifth of a series of seven concerts of Stockhausen's works. A "London Version" was made in 1973. Although this version was performed and recorded, it is close to the Paris version and has neither been published nor given a separate number in the composer's catalog.

== Form ==
Stop consists of forty-two sections, each characterised by a different configuration of pitches, or by noises. The durations of these groups are related by proportions of Fibonacci numbers, while their pitches are based on a twelve-note "central chord", within which a succession of nine single tones progresses gradually downward, alternating with a rising progression of six bichords that suddenly falls into the bass register for an ending, seventh bichord. Interspersed amongst these single and double pitches there are six trichords in a falling-rising pattern, four tetrachords in a jagged down-up-down shape, and two widely separated six-note chords in groups 9 and 41. According to a different analysis, there are twelve central tones that gradually fall (with one deviation in the middle) over the course of the work:

G_{6} B♭_{5} G_{5} A_{4} G♯_{4} D♯_{5} E_{4} D_{4} F_{3} C♯_{3} F♯_{2} C_{2}.

Near the end, a concealed children's song appears "like wind", in agitated, dissonant tremolos over a solemn bass line. This tonal melody, introduced as a simulated short-wave radio signal, appears to be intended to provoke a strong emotional reaction.

Although the score specifies that the six groups be placed "as far apart from one another as possible", the version conducted by the composer in London on 9 March 1973 did not differentiate them spatially.

== Instrumentation ==
=== Paris version ===
The instrumentation in this version is flexible, but the following scoring is suggested by way of example:

- Group I: oboe, piano, synthesizer
- Group II: synthesizer, trumpet, cello
- Group III: vibraphone + tamtam, bass clarinet, electric cello
- Group IV: cor anglais, synthesizer, bassoon
- Group V: clarinet, violin, harp, trombone
- Group VI: flute, electric bassoon, horn

=== London version ===
The instrumentation is based on the Paris version:

- Group I: oboe, piano, electric organ
- Group II: electronium, trumpet, cello
- Group III: vibraphone + tamtam, bass clarinet, electric cello
- Group IV: cor anglais, synthesizer, bassoon
- Group V: clarinet, violin, harp, trombone
- Group VI: flute, electric bassoon + alto saxophone + synthesizer, horn

=== Stop und Start ===
Although the details of the scoring are more exactly worked out in this version, it is also possible to substitute instruments, or even to increase the numbers, so long as the balance among the groups is maintained.

- Group I: synthesizer and bass clarinet
- Group II: synthesizer and trombone
- Group III: synthesizer and basset horn
- Group IV: synthesizer and saxophone
- Group V: synthesizer and trumpet
- Group VI: synthesizer (or percussion) and flutes (one player)

In addition to the performers and a conductor, both versions are electronically amplified, requiring microphones, loudspeakers, and a mixing desk operated by a sound director.

== Discography ==
- Stockhausen: Stop; Ylem. London Sinfonietta, Karlheinz Stockhausen (cond.). LP recording. DG DG 2530 442. Hamburg: Deutsche Grammophon, 1974. OCLC 1121051421 Stop reissued on CD, Stockhausen: Kontra-Punkte; Zeitmaße; Stop; Adieu. Stockhausen Complete Edition CD 4. Kürten: Stockhausen-Verlag, 2002. OCLC 55223952
- Stockhausen: Europa-Gruss; Stop und Start; Two Couples; Elektronische und Konkrete Musik zu Komet; Licht-Ruf. Stockhausen Complete Edition CD 64. Kürten: Stockhausen-Verlag, 2002. OCLC 1073403823
