= Diego Masson =

French conductor, composer, and percussionist

Diego Masson (born 21 June 1935) is a French conductor, composer, and percussionist.

== Biography ==
The son of artist André Masson and brother of the singer and actor Luís Masson, Diego Masson was born in Tossa de Mar, Spain. He studied piano and composition at the Paris Conservatoire. Upon graduation, he joined the Domaine Musical as percussionist and began studying conducting with the group's director, Pierre Boulez. In 1966 he formed Musique Vivante, a group specializing in contemporary music which he still directs. Musique Vivante has introduced many important compositions by French and foreign composers, in particular the music of Boulez and Karlheinz Stockhausen. In 1969 Masson conducted the world première of Stockhausen's Stop, which is dedicated to him, and the group also took part in the premières of "Setz die Segel zur Sonne" from Aus den sieben Tagen and the 1972 version of Momente.

In addition to conducting specialist new-music groups like the Asko Ensemble, Xenakis Ensemble, the Composers Ensemble, Klangforum Wien, the London Sinfonietta, Ensemble Alternance, Ensemble Modern, and Musik Fabrik, he has worked with major orchestras including all the BBC Orchestras, Berlin Symphony Orchestra, Stavanger Symphony, Orchestre Philharmonique de Radio France, Netherlands Radio Philharmonic, Orchestre de la Suisse Romande, the Collegium Academicum of Geneva, Helsinki Philharmonic, Bergen Philharmonic, Scottish Chamber Orchestra, Hungarian State Symphony Orchestra, the Sydney and Melbourne Symphony Orchestras, the New Zealand Symphony, the Hong Kong Philharmonic, and the Rotterdam Philharmonic Orchestra.

He is also an acclaimed conductor of opera and ballet. He was music director of the Ballet-Théâtre Contemporain of Amiens from its formation in 1968. In 1972 it moved to Angers, where it was combined with the opera company as the Théâtre Musical d'Angers under Masson's direction. He left in 1975 to become music director of Marseille Opera (until 1981) where, amongst other things, he conducted a Ring cycle. He has been guest conductor with opera companies including Opera North, Scottish Opera and the Aspen Festival. He co-conducted (with Patrick Bailey) the UK premiere of Luigi Nono's Prometeo at the Royal Festival Hall in London on 9 and 10 May 2008.

Masson has also worked extensively with youth orchestras: in the UK regularly at Trinity College of Music and the Royal Northern College of Music, and as guest conductor of the Symphony Orchestra of Chetham's School of Music; in the US with the Juilliard Orchestra; and in Australia with the Australian Youth Orchestra. He held conducting masterclasses every year at Dartington International Summer School from 1983 to 2010.

His activities as a composer and arranger were mainly from the early part of his career and included film scores composed for Équivoque 1900 (1966), and two Louis Malle projects, the "William Wilson" segment of the Edgar Allan Poe triptych Histoires extraordinaires (1968), and Black Moon (1975), for which he adapted music by Wagner. He was music director for the latter, as well as for the 1996 French/German television Beethoven biopic La Musique de l'amour: Un amour inachevé.
