= Ausmultiplikation =

German term for a musical composition technique

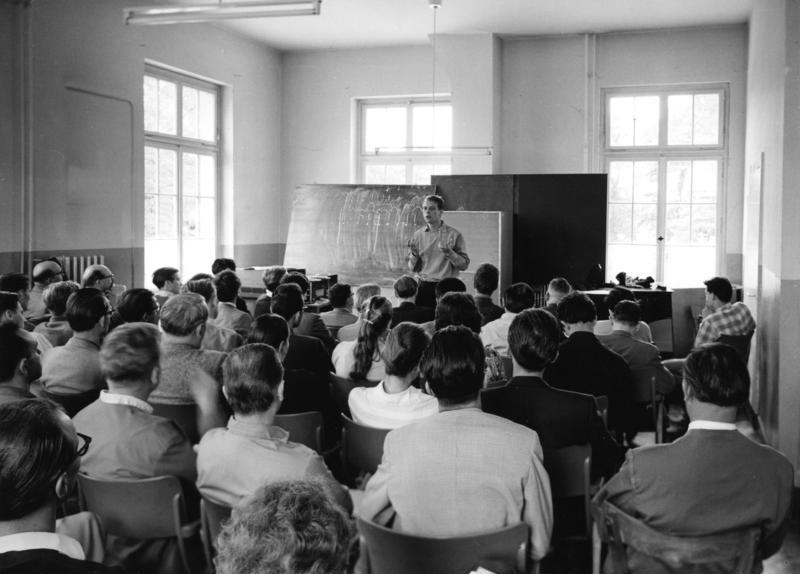
Stockhausen lecturing at the Darmstädter Ferienkurse, July 1957

Ausmultiplikation (literally, "multiplying-out" (Note: In German, the term is used to describe a distributive property in elementary algebra.)) is a German term used by the composer, Karlheinz Stockhausen to describe a technique in which a long note is replaced by shorter "melodic configurations, internally animated around central tones", resembling the ornamental technique of divisions (also called "diminutions") in Renaissance music. Stockhausen first described this technique in connection with his "opus 1", Kontra-Punkte, composed in 1952–53, but in his later formula composition there is a related method of substituting a complete or partial formula for a single tone that is very long in a much slower, "more background" projection of the formula. When this is done at more than one level, the result is reminiscent of a fractal.

== Notes and references ==
Notes

=== Sources ===
- Hartwell, Robin. 2012. "Threats and Promises: Lucifer, Hell, and Stockhausen's Sunday from Light". Perspectives of New Music 50, nos. 1 & 2 (Winter–Summer): 393–424. doi:10.7757/persnewmusi.50.1-2.0393 JSTOR 10.7757/persnewmusi.50.1-2.0393
- Kohl, Jerome. 1990. "Into the Middleground: Formula Syntax in Stockhausen's Licht". Perspectives of New Music 28, no. 2 (Summer): 262–291.
- Stockhausen, Karlheinz. 1989. "Wille zur Form und Wille zum Abenteuer". In his Texte zur Musik 6, edited by Christoph von Blumröder, 320–346. DuMont Dokumente. Cologne: DuMont Buchverlag. ISBN 3-7701-2249-6.
