= Suzanne Stephens =

American clarinetist and basset horn player

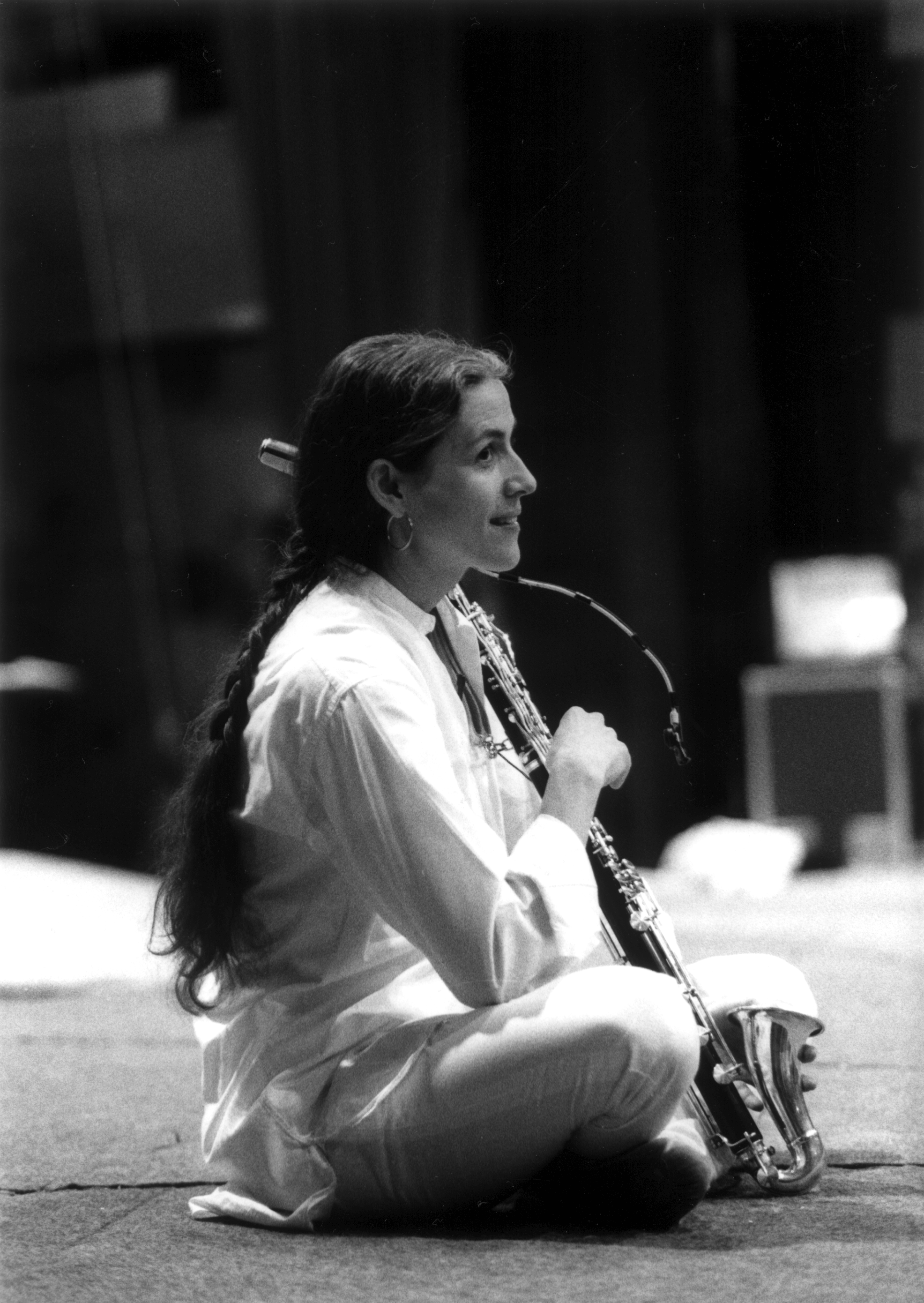
- Suzanne Stephens in 1988.

Background information
- Born: July 28, 1946 (age 79); Waterloo, Iowa, U.S.
- Genres: Classical
- Occupations: Soloist; Chamber musician
- Instruments: Clarinet; basset horn; bass clarinet
- Years active: 1970s–present
- Labels: Deutsche Grammophon; Acanta; ECM; Stockhausen Complete Edition

Suzanne Stephens (born July 28, 1946) is an American clarinetist, resident in Germany, described as "an outstanding performer and tireless promoter of the clarinet and basset horn".

== Biography ==
Suzanne Stephens was born in Waterloo, Iowa, the daughter of an American military officer, and grew up in the US, Heidelberg in Germany, and Saumur sur Loire in France. She studied clarinet initially with Ralph Hills in Fairfax, Virginia, and Sidney Forrest in Washington, D.C. She then studied in Paris with Ulysses Delécluse and Marcel Jean, before enrolling at Northwestern University in Evanston, Illinois, where she studied with Jerome Stowell, second clarinetist of the Chicago Symphony Orchestra, receiving the degrees Bachelor of Music Education and Master of Music. She won a Fulbright Scholarship in 1969–70, with which she pursued further studies under Hans Deinzer at the Academy of Music and Theater in Hanover. After passing the Konzertexamen there, she won the Kranichsteiner Musikpreis at Darmstadt and a silver medal at the International Clarinet Competition in Geneva, both in 1972. In 1973 she was appointed principal clarinetist of the Radio Orchestra of the South German Radio in Stuttgart, a position she held until 1975. In 1974–75 she was part of the German Young Soloists Podium.

In March 1974 she was a guest artist with the Oeldorf Group, a collective founded in 1971 by Péter Eötvös, David C. Johnson, Joachim Krist, Mesías Maiguashca, and Gaby Schumacher. They adopted this name because many of them lived in Oeldorf, a district of the municipality of Kürten, and gave concerts of new music in a barn there. Most members of the group were closely connected with Karlheinz Stockhausen, who lived nearby, and at that time was rehearsing his latest composition, Herbstmusik, with the group. Stockhausen added a concluding duet for clarinet and viola, titled "Laub und Regen" (Leaves and Rain), for Stephens to perform with Krist. Although Herbstmusik was not a success at its premiere at the Bremen Pro Musica Festival on May 4, 1974, it led to one of the most fruitful collaborations in history between a clarinetist and a composer, which resulted in more than thirty works featuring both the clarinet, bass clarinet, and basset horn.

Since 1974, Stephens has performed Stockhausen's works, always from memory, in Europe, Japan, Israel, India, South America, Russia, and the USA. Stockhausen's opera cycle Licht includes a prominent basset-horn part in the role of Eve, also written for Stephens.

It was at Stockhausen's suggestion that Stephens took up the basset horn, in order that she should play a middle-register instrument between the trumpet and trombone, two of the other principal instruments in the opera cycle Licht, begun by Stockhausen in 1977. Stephens was often more of a co-creator than just an interpreter, collaborating in the exploration of all the dimensions of performance, including new playing techniques and special effects (such as flutter tonguing, glissandos, singing while playing, microtones, breath and key noises), as well as special choreography and costumes. The basset horn Suzanne Stephens plays is an instrument built by G. Leblanc Cie/Paris in 1977, with which she uses an E♭ alto-clarinet mouthpiece in order to increase the resonance of the noises.

The monumental basset-horn part Licht by itself amounts to some eight hours of music: substantial portions of Donnerstag (premiered in 1981 at the Teatro alla Scala in Milan, new staging in 1985 at the Royal Opera at Covent Garden in London), Montag (premiered in May 1988 at the Teatro alla Scala in Milan), and Freitag (premiered at the Leipzig Opera in 1996), as well as scenes from Mittwoch (fourth scene, Michaelion, premiered in 1998 at the Prinzregententheater, Munich) and Sonntag (third scene, Licht-Bilder, premiered October 16, 2004 in Donaueschingen). More recently she performed the world premieres of the Fifth and Sixth Hours of Stockhausen's last and unfinished chamber-music cycle Klang: Harmonien, for unaccompanied bass clarinet (July 11, 2007 in the Sülztalhalle, Kürten, during the Stockhausen Courses there), and Schönheit, for bass clarinet, flute, and trumpet (at the Grande Auditório of the Gulbenkian Foundation in Lisbon, on October 5, 2009).

She has been involved in the production of scores and recordings of Stockhausen's works, as well as in teaching and coaching clarinetists studying this repertoire.

== Discography ==
- 1976. Karlheinz Stockhausen, Sternklang. Polydor 2612031 (2LP). Hamburg: Polydor International GmbH. Reissued Deutsche Grammophon 2707 123 (2 LPs). Hamburg: Polydor International GmbH, 1976. Reissued on Stockhausen Complete Edition CD 18 (2 CDs). Kürten: Stockhausen-Verlag, 1991.
- 1978. Karlheinz Stockhausen, Harlekin and Der kleine Harlekin. Deutsche Grammophon 2531 006 (LP). Hamburg: Polydor International GmbH. Reissued on Stockhausen Complete Edition CD 25. Kürten: Stockhausen-Verlag, 1991.
- 1979. Karlheinz Stockhausen, Inori. (Suzanne Stephens, Japanese rin). (With: Stockhausen, Formel.) Deutsche Grammophon 2707 111 (2 LPs). Hamburg: Polydor International GmbH, 1978. Inori alone reissued on Stockhausen Complete Edition CD 22 (CD). Kürten: Stockhausen-Verlag, 1991.
- 1980. Karlheinz Stockhausen, Sirius. Deutsche Grammophon 2707 122 (2 LPs) Hamburg: Polydor International GmbH. Reissued on Stockhausen Complete Edition CD 26 (2 CDs). Kürten: Stockhausen-Verlag, 1991.
- 1983. Karlheinz Stockhausen, Donnerstag aus Licht, opera. Deutsche Grammophon 2740 272 (4-LP box set) and 473 379-2 (4CD) (4 CDs). Hamburg: Polydor International GmbH. Reissued on Stockhausen Complete Edition CD 30-ABCD (4 CDs). Kürten: Stockhausen-Verlag, 1992.
- 1985. Karlheinz Stockhausen, Tierkreis: Trio Version; Wolfgang Amadeus Mozart, Concerto for Clarinet and Orchestra in A Major, KV 622 (cadenzas by Karlheinz Stockhausen). Markus Stockhausen, trumpet and piano, Kathinka Pasveer, flute and piccolo; Suzanne Stephens, clarinet; Radio-Symphonie-Orchester Berlin; Karlheinz Stockhausen, cond. Acanta 23531 (LP) and 43201 (CD). Hamburg: Fono Team GmbH, 1985. Clarinet Concerto reissued as part of Stockhausen Conducts Haydn and Mozart. Stockhausen Complete Edition CD 39 (2 CDs). Kürten: Stockhausen-Verlag, 1993.
- 1986. Stockhausen, Karlheinz. Unsichtbare Chöre. Deutsche Grammophon 419432-1 (LP) and 419 432-2 (CD). Hamburg: Polydor International GmbH. Reissued on Stockhausen Complete Edition CD 31 (CD). Kürten: Stockhausen-Verlag, 1992.
- 1988. Stockhausen, Karlheinz. In Freundschaft, Traum-Formel, Amour. Deutsche Grammophon 419 378-2 (CD). Hamburg: Polydor International GmbH. Reissued on Stockhausen Complete Edition CD 27 (CD). Kürten: Stockhausen-Verlag, 1992.
- 1992. Stockhausen, Monday from Light, opera. Stockhausen Complete Edition CD 36-ABCDE (5 CDs). Kürten: Stockhausen-Verlag.
- 1992. Stockhausen, Ave and Tierkreis, Trio Version. (Also with Oberlippentanz.) Stockhausen Complete Edition CD 35. Kürten: Stockhausen-Verlag.
- Karlheinz Stockhausen, Michaels Reise: Solisten-Version, Markus Stockhausen, trumpet, Kathinka Pasveer, flute; Suzanne Stephens, basset horn, and 7 other musicians. ECM New Series. ECM 1406. Munich: ECM Records, 1992.
- 1994. Musik für Klarinette, Baßklarinette, Bassetthorn: Suzee Stephens spielt 15 Kompositionen. Stockhausen Complete Edition CD 32 A–C (3 CDs). Kürten: Stockhausen-Verlag.
- 1994. Stockhausen, Examen. (Also with Eingang und Formel, Drachenkampf, Oberlippentanz, and 2 versions of Pietà.) Stockhausen Complete Edition CD 43 (2 CDs). Kürten: Stockhausen-Verlag.
- 2000. CD 55 Bassetsu-Trio (Suzanne Stephens, basset horn; Marco Blaauw, trumpet; Andrew Digby, trombone). With Mittwochs-Abschied
- 2002. Stockhausen, Europa-Gruss for winds and synthesizers (Suzanne Stephens, clarinet); Licht-Ruf (Suzanne Stephens, basset horn). Also with Two Couples, for electronic and concrete music, Electronic and Concrete Music for Komet, and Stop and Start for 6 instrumental groups. Stockhausen Complete Edition CD 64. Kürten: Stockhausen-Verlag.
- 2003. Friday from Light, opera. Stockhausen Complete Edition CD 50 (4 CDs). Kürten: Stockhausen-Verlag.
- 2003. Stockhausen, Ten scenes from Freitag aus Licht. Stockhausen Complete Edition CD 65. Kürten: Stockhausen-Verlag.
- 2005. Stockhausen, Licht-Bilder (3rd Scene of Sonntag aus Licht), for tenor, ring-modulated flute, basset horn, and ring-modulated trumpet. Stockhausen Complete Edition CD 68. Kürten: Stockhausen-Verlag.
- 2007. CD 82 Bassetsu, for basset horn; Quitt, for alto flute, clarinet, and trumpet. (With Michaels-Ruf, Synthi-Fou, Komet, and Trumpetent) Kürten: Stockhausen-Verlag.
- 2010. Harmonien and Schönheit. Stockhausen Complete Edition CD 87. Kürten: Stockhausen-Verlag.
