= Herbstmusik =

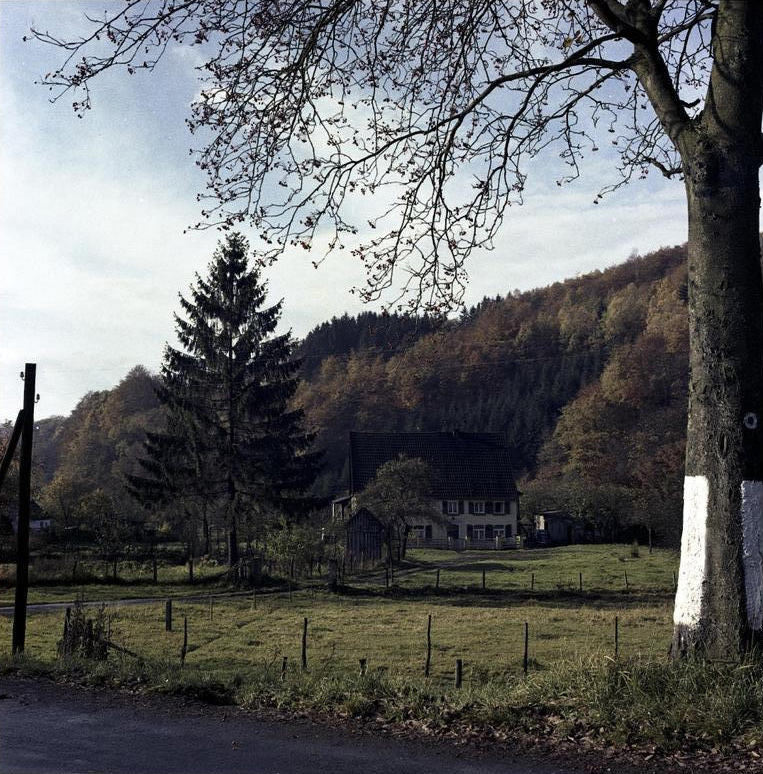
Autumn in the Bergisches Land, 1960

Herbstmusik (Autumn Music) is a music-theatre work for four performers composed by Karlheinz Stockhausen in 1974. It is Nr. 40 in his catalogue of works, and lasts a little over an hour in performance.

== History ==
Herbstmusik was written in March 1974 and was premiered in the Großer Glockensaal in Bremen on 4 May 1974, by the score's three dedicatees, Péter Eötvös, Joachim Krist, and Suzanne Stephens, along with the composer himself.

It is an early step in a series of works from the 1970s exploring theatrical elements in music, progressing from Trans and Inori through Musik im Bauch, Atmen gibt das Leben, and Sirius, leading ultimately to the opera cycle Licht.)

It is the only composed example of a larger project of "scenes from daily life", itself part of an even more general Prinzip des Ganzen (holistic principle) formulated for a grand but unrealised project provisionally titled Oper (Opera), sketched in 1968–69. At the same time, it is an attempt to preserve endangered sounds and customs of the harvest season in Stockhausen's country homeland, the Bergisches Land east of Cologne. Stockhausen explained that, when composing this work,

I looked for a musical link between autumn and the typical sounds which accompany that season, noises with an emotive resonance, …The reassuring sound of dry leaves, the sound of rain, the sound of rotten wood crushed beneath the foot or in the hand, the distant banging when something is being nailed down.

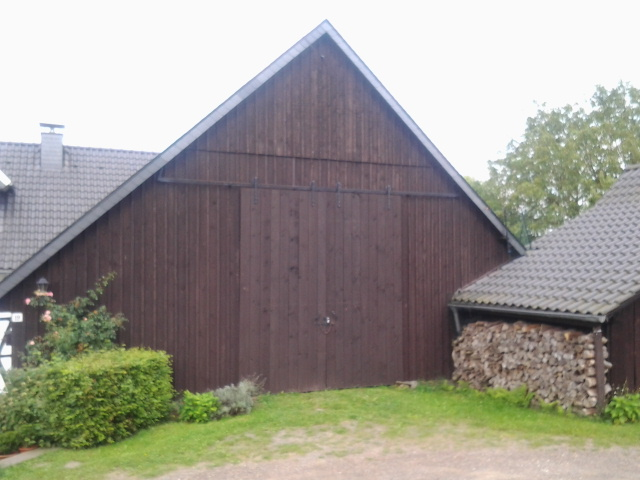
The Oeldorf barn where Herbstmusik was first rehearsed

Herbstmusik was written for the Oeldorf Group, a musicians' collective founded by Stockhausen’s then assistant Péter Eötvös when he first moved from Hungary to Germany in early 1971. Stockhausen had helped him to find a farmhouse in Oeldorf, a component village of the Gemeinde Kürten, not far from Stockhausen's own home. Together with the cellist Gaby Schumacher, flautist David C. Johnson, and violist Joachim Krist, Eötvös organised a regular summer concert series held in the barn attached to the farmhouse. It was in this barn that rehearsals were begun for Herbstmusik, with Eötvös, Krist, Stockhausen, and the American clarinettist Suzanne Stephens, who was visiting to perform in one of the Summer Night Music concerts. The rustic atmosphere was evidently an essential element of the work, which did not later transfer successfully to the concert hall.

== Analysis ==
There are four movements, which are played without a break:

1. Ein Dach vernageln (Nailing a Roof): duo with accompaniment
2. Holz brechen (Breaking Wood): quartet
3. Dreschen (Threshing): trio
4. Laub und Regen (Leaves and Rain): duo

Because the visual-dramatic nature of a performance is so evident, Stockhausen calls special attention to the sounds in the first movement: "Please listen to the sound of nailing. … Perhaps you will not have noticed that this is music". The sounds of the leaves in the last movement also constitute "music which perhaps only a few have experienced—and if as children, they probably have forgotten it.

=== First movement ===
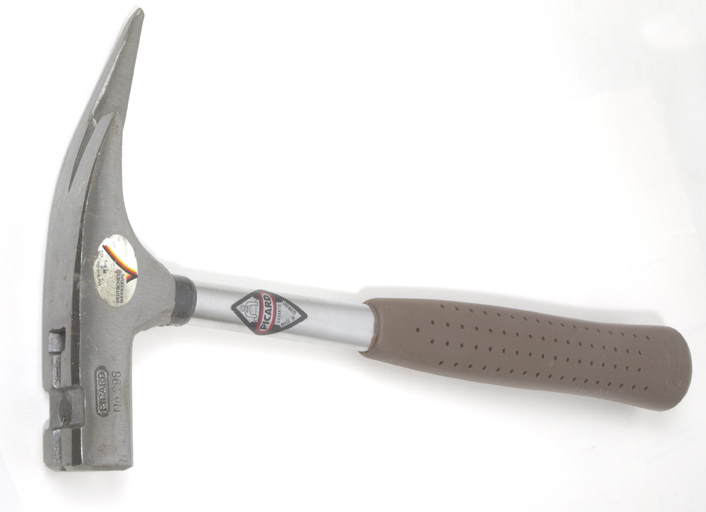
Roofing (carpenter's) hammer (Latthammer), specified for the first movement of Herbstmusik

The first movement is "literally a two-part polyphony of nailing boards into the roof of a wooden shed". The score specifies that the two players use a type of roofing (or carpenter's) hammer commonly used in Germany, with one long, tapered point. In addition to ordinary nailing, "all timbres that can possibly result from the contact between hammer or fingers with the nails or wood should be musically exploited" including stroking the heads of different-sized nails with the hammer, quivering the tapered point of the hammer rapidly between two nails or rows of nails, sustained pattering of the broad side of the hammer on two nail heads, or rapid "trilling" of the hammer on a nailhead. These varied sounds follow a formal process in five stages, leading from ordinary nailing to a final, very delicate phase with "individual short trills, soft rebounds, … and magically iridescent timbres". The main, nailing duet is accompanied intermittently by a clarinetist who practices fragments of the melodic formula that will figure later in the fourth movement. The two roofers occasionally whistle bits of what they hear the clarinetist play. This movement should have "a strong formal effect, and communicate an impression of absolute precision".

=== Second movement ===
After finishing the roof, all four performers take their places on chairs, light a campfire, and proceed to break small branches and twigs, starting with the larger pieces and proceeding toward the thinner ones. This process falls into ten phases, ending with a ritardando of clicking and rustling sounds resembling the "very bright crackling of a fire". Throughout the movement, the ensemble playing should resemble that of a string quartet.

=== Third movement ===
Threshing with flails in Konz, Germany (video)

The threshing trio is divided into thirteen phases. The action of beating the grain produces an overall change of sound away from an opening crispness of sound. The threshers alternate working singly, in pairs, and all three together, synchronously and in rotation, miming conflict with each other and reconciliation.

=== Fourth movement: "Laub und Regen" ===
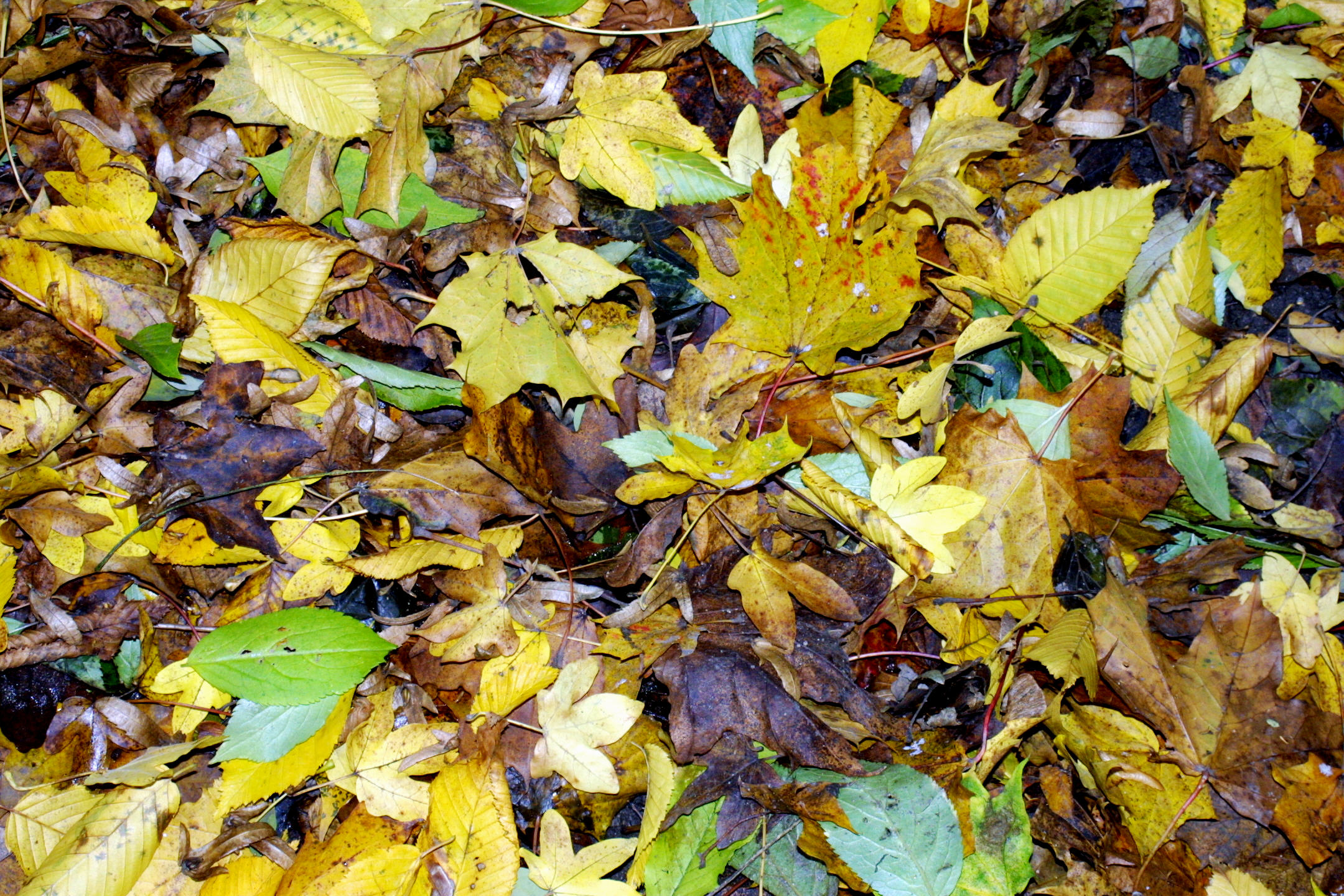
Autumn leaves

The final movement of Herbstmusik falls into nineteen phases, beginning with a scuffle between a man and a girl in the dry leaves. A rain shower soaks both the leaves and the performers, after which they bring out their instruments (a clarinet and a viola) for the concluding eight phases, consisting of a "final duet".

The duet for clarinet and viola that closes the fourth movement can be played on its own as a concert work. In this form, it is given the original title of the entire last movement of Herbstmusik, Laub und Regen, and bears the work number 40½ in the composer's catalog. This reversion to conventionally notated, composed-out music unites two of Stockhausen's characteristic devices, process composition and formula composition.

The melodic formula that lies at its base was written as an example during a composition seminar. When it initially is presented in the first movement, it is marked "gut zum Mitpfeifen" (good for whistling along with), a remark aimed at the actions of the two roofers. The formula contains fifteen notes divided into five segments of 1 + 2 + 5 + 3 + 4. The durations of the notes within these segments are measured in quavers: 1, 1+2, 5+3+2+4+1, 2+1+3, and 3+1+2+4. Rests at the end of each segment are also serially arranged, 3+5+1+4+2 quavers. Added to the durations of the preceding sounding notes, the five segments come to 4 + 8 + 16 + 10 + 12 quavers. In the clarinet-viola duet, this formula is first presented in its plainest form, and then is subjected to a succession of elaborations resembling the method followed in Mantra, only in this case the duet texture permits the formula to be presented simply in one instrument, while the other embellishes it. Despite the elaborate serial system used to produce it, the result recalls Béla Bartók's Contrasts.

The overall form of Herbstmusik therefore begins with everyday working sounds, upon which some melodic tones are superimposed. The pitched sounds later establish themselves in opposition to the noise. In the fourth movement the clarinet melody is heard without accompanying noises, and from this single-voice melody a two-part texture evolves, with a theatrical motivation: The woman clarinet player teaches her tune to the violist. The violist reflects on a more local level the formal process of the whole work. He begins with noise, represented by awkward playing, but gradually learns the melody. In this way the piece that had begun with nailing noises leads eventually to melody and simple polyphonic interaction.

A somewhat more complex shape is suggested by regarding the form as the interaction of four evolutionary processes in different frequency bands:

Scene	Pitch	Material	Structure	Sound quality	Process
1	medium	metal	periodic	clangorous	ascending
2	medium/high	wood	aperiodic	snapping/cracking	ascending
3	low/high	batons/straw	periodic/statistical	pounding/rusting	descending
4	high/low	bodies/leaves	aperiodic/statistical	thudding/crushing	descending

== Reception ==
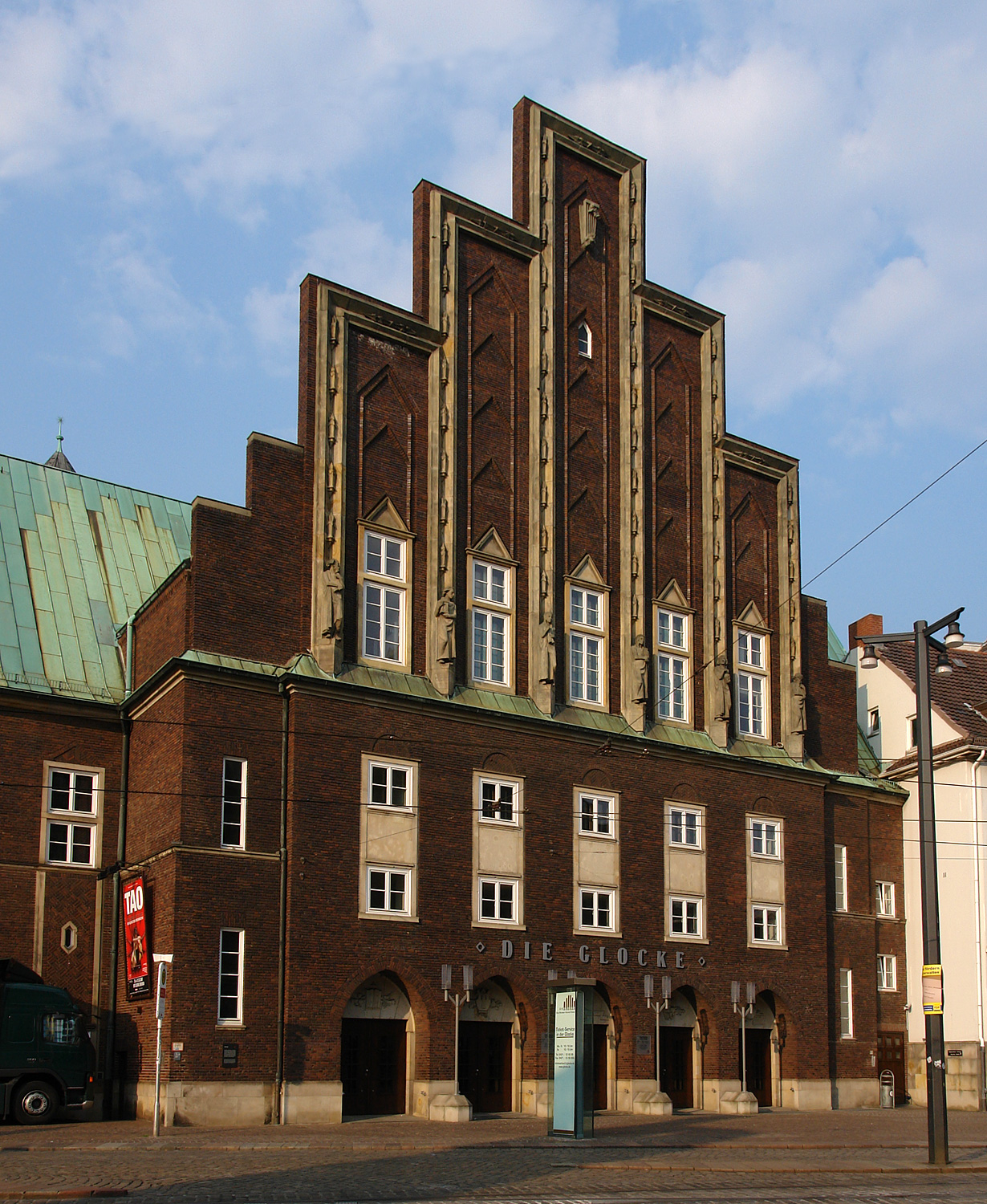
Die Glocke in Bremen, where Herbstmusik was premiered in the Großer Saal

At the 1974 premiere in Bremen, a beat band on the ground floor was loud enough to drown out the amplified sounds of breaking twigs in the second movement, during which members of the audience shouted encouragement and joined in to help break some of the larger, more stubborn branches, which were passed around the hall. By the time the performers had gotten well into the threshing scene, a member of the restless audience called out to the flailing trio, "How 'bout a beer break?". Finally, the audience was incensed by the tumbling in the hay of the concluding movement, though one witness found it "innocently adolescent". Even a sympathetic critic could only conclude by quoting the character Gustav von Aschenbach in Thomas Mann's Death in Venice: "Music is the most ambiguous of all the arts".

When Herbstmusik was next given at the second Rencontres Internationales d’Art Contemporaine in La Rochelle on 28 June, one critic savaged it as "the lowpoint of a uniquely varied career", finding the earlier Alphabet für Liège a much more subtle and rich exploration of the "'musicalization' of everyday activity".

It was performed for a third time at the Darmstädter Ferienkurse shortly afterward, when a reviewer chose only to mention that it included a "delightfully tuneful duet for violin and clarinet at the end".

A later writer detects a sense of mischief in Stockhausen’s deliberate transposition of a non-visual, radiophonic sound play into a theatrical setting, where the visual element is guaranteed to be misconstrued. From this perspective, the "documentary … scenic sound-actions" of Herbstmusik are regarded as showing the composer "at his most engaging and self-effacing", and are praised for their "truth and moral concreteness" which make a "refreshing change from the preciousness of conventional virtuosity". The closing duet in particular is seen as "charming and witty", with "an attractive lightness of touch".

== Discography ==
No complete recording of Herbstmusik has yet been released, but Laub und Regen was recorded on 30 June 1994 by its dedicatees, Suzanne Stephens (clarinet) & Joachim Krist (viola), for release as part of:

- Suzee Stephens spielt 15 Kompositionen [von] Stockhausen: Musik für Klarinette, Baßklarinette, Bassetthorn. Stockhausen Complete Edition CD 32 A-B-C (3 CDs). Kürten: Stockhausen-Verlag, 1994.
