= Freitag aus Licht =

Opera by Karlheinz Stockhausen

- Opera by Karlheinz Stockhausen
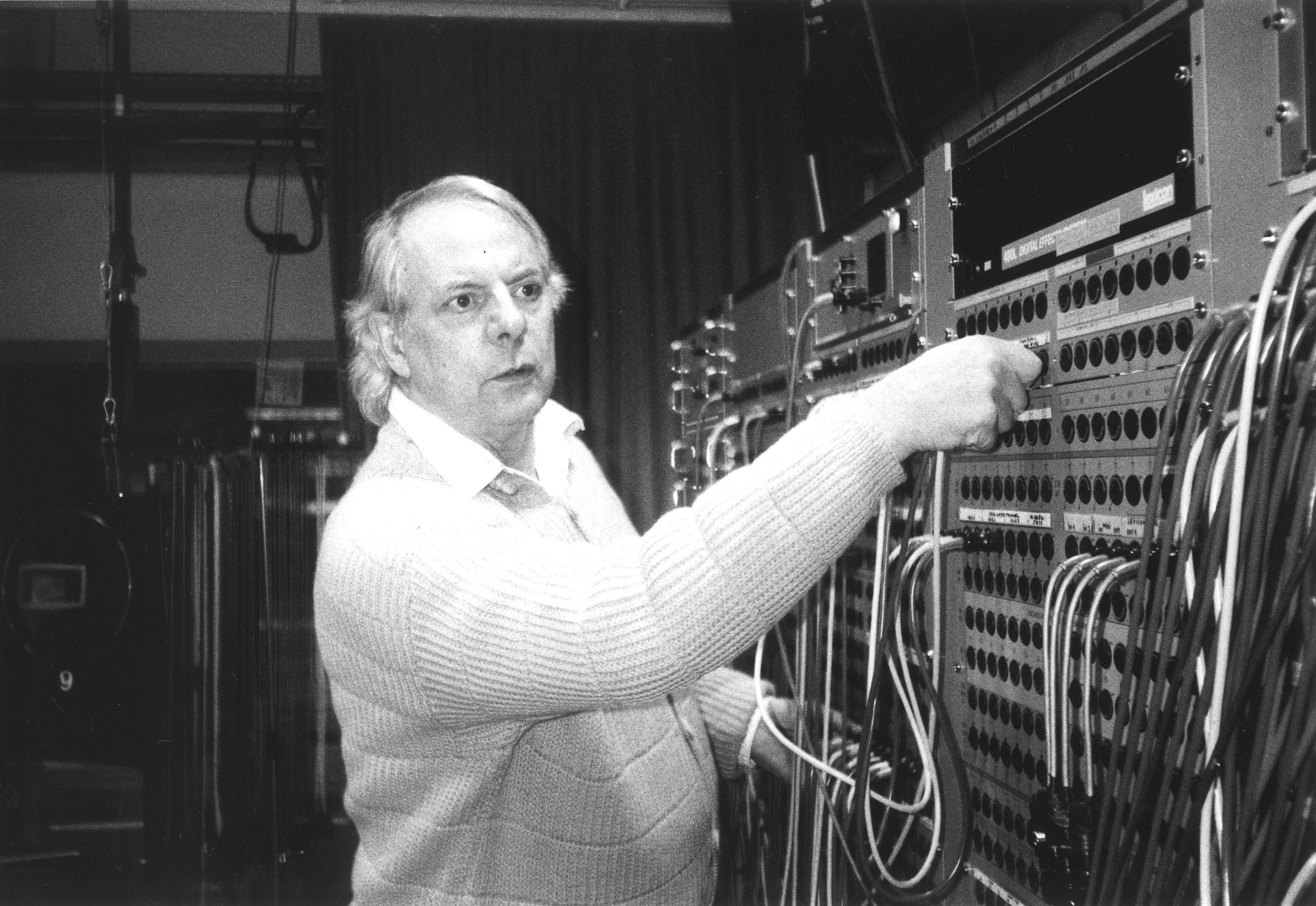
- Stockhausen in the Electronic Music Studio of the WDR, October 1994
- Librettist: Stockhausen
- Language: German
- Premiere: 12 September 1996; Oper Leipzig

Freitag aus Licht (Friday from Light), the main body of which is also titled Freitag-Versuchung (Friday Temptation), is the fifth to be composed of the seven operas that comprise Licht (Light), by Karlheinz Stockhausen. It was the last of the operas to receive a staged production with the composer's involvement.

== History ==
Freitag was commissioned by Udo Zimmermann of the Oper Leipzig, which gave the staged premiere on 12 September 1996. Three subsequent performances were given on September 13, 14, and 15. The musical direction and sound projection was done by the composer. The staging was done by Uwe Wand. Stage, costume, object and lighting designs were from Johannes Conen. Johannes Bönig did the choreography. In addition to the soloists, the choir of the Leipzig Opera, the children's choirs of the Oper Leipzig and Mitteldeutscher Rundfunk, and the children's orchestra of the Johann Sebastian Bach music school of Leipzig performed in the original production.

The production was filmed for a documentary by WDR. A four-disc audio recording of the opera is available from the Stockhausen Verlag (CD 50).

== Roles ==
Role	Performer	Premiere Cast
Eve	soprano	Angela Tunstall
Ludon	bass	Nicholas Isherwood
Caino	baritone	Jürgen Kurth
Elu	basset-horn	Suzanne Stephens
Lufa	flute	Kathinka Pasveer
Synthibird	synthesizer	Massimiliano Viel
Couple 1
Woman	dancer	Jennifer Mann
Man	dancer	Volker Wurth
Couple 2
Cat	dancer	Claudia Kratzheller
Dog	dancer	Markus Wittstock
Couple 3
Photocopy Machine	dancer	Lucy Teisingerova
Typewriter	dancer	Lole Geßler
Couple 4
Racing Car	dancer	Silke Pietsch
Racing Driver	dancer	Ludger Rademacher
Couple 5
Pinball Machine	dancer	Xenia Bogomolec
Pinball Machine Player	dancer	Simon John Rowe
Couple 6
Soccer Ball	dancer	Jutta Bernhardt
Kicking Leg With Soccer Shoe	dancer	Thomas Seger
Couple 7
Moon With Little Owl	dancer	Ellen Schaller
Rocket	dancer	Peer Rohrsdorf
Couple 8
Bare Arm	dancer	Carola Schweiger
Hand Holding Drug Syringe	dancer	Uwe Volkert
Couple 9
Electric Pencil Sharpener	dancer	Elke Hunstock
Pencil	dancer	Andreas Kirsche
Couple 10
Woman's Mouth With Crocus Blossom	dancer	Christine Hebestreit
Ice Cream Cone With Bee	dancer	Wolfgang Maas
Couple 11
Violin	dancer	Angelika Wenzel
Bow	dancer	Alessio Trevisani
Couple 12
Nest	dancer	Alexandra Paul
Raven	dancer	Todd Ford

== Synopsis ==
There are three layers of music in Freitag. The first layer is entirely abstract ambient electronic music, which plays underneath all of the staged action. The second layer consists of concrete music which is mimed by 12 couples of dancers. The third layer consists of traditional scenic action portrayed and sung by actors. In the synopsis below, the events of the third layer are described first, but they occur simultaneously with the events of the second layer, referred to as "sound scenes" by Stockhausen.

The plot is a retelling of the creation myth from the Book of Genesis. It employs elements from the Urantia Book. Adam's wife, Eve, is tempted to have an illicit union with Caino in order to accelerate the development of mankind. Because this advancement is not part of God's plan for humanity, Eve and Caino's affair has grievous consequences, namely, a brutal war between children of different races. The basic outline of Eve's sin and repentance is echoed in the action of the dancer couples. They begin as natural pairings, but as a result of swapping partners, they engender unnatural hybrids. In the opera's finale, these hybrids join into a towering candle flame and spiral upward.

=== Friday Greeting ===
The audience is greeted by 8-track electronic music in the lobby, which is lit solely by candles. The music is the first layer of the opera. Duration: 68.5 minutes

=== Act one ===
Duration: 67.5 minutes

==== Proposal ====
Eve enters from the left followed by two companions, Elu and Lufa. Ludon enters from the right, and they greet each other. He suggests that Eve should mate with his son Caino. Eve is skeptical, but they agree to meet again to introduce their children to each other.

==== Children's Orchestra ====
Eve descends from a mountain with her white children in tow. The children carry instruments with them (violins, flutes, etc.). Elu and Lufa follow behind the children. The children play individual notes and call to each other as they march.

Ludon enters with his black children, who are all carrying African percussion instruments. The children play their instruments and laugh as they march.

Ludon and Eve greet each other once more as the two groups of children face each other. Synthibird appears with a keyboard nearby. The white orchestra plays for the black chorus, who enjoy the music. Eve sings with the choir and conducts them. Elu and Lufa play along from the background, as does Synthibird.

==== Children's Choir ====
After a brief pause, the black chorus cheers for the white orchestra and use their instruments to applaud. Synthibird disappears.

Ludon signals the black chorus and they begin to sing and play on their African percussion instruments. Synthibird appears in a new location in a slightly different guise and accompanies them quietly. Ludon sings along and signals to each of the 24 children to perform a solo. Eve and her children are spellbound by the performance and erupt in wild cheers and whistles when it is over. Ludon suggests to Eve that their children should play together, and she agrees.

==== Children's Tutti ====
Eve gives a downbeat for the first bar, which is played only by the white orchestra. Ludon conducts the second bar, which is only played by the black chorus. Eve conducts the third and fourth bars which are played by both the chorus and orchestra. Each section is followed by silence. After the fourth bar, Ludon graciously asks Eve to conduct the ensemble, and he joins the chorus to sing. Elu, Lufa and Synthibird accompany.

The music is performed cheerfully by everyone, and at the end, they all laugh. Eve and her children say goodbye to Ludon and his, and they exit as they came in. During their departure, the children continue to laugh and play fragments of the music they performed together. The sound of their laughter and music grows softer in the distance.

==== Consent ====
Ludon enters and waits for Eve who appears mysteriously with Elu and Lufa. Ludon gives Eve a black talisman and asks her again to mate with his son Caino. He argues that their offspring will help the evolution of mankind. Eve agrees and gives the talisman back to Ludon. She disappears with Elu and Lufa, to Ludon's surprise. He exits along the same path by which he entered.

=== Act two ===
Duration: 81.5 minutes

==== Fall ====
The moon is reflected in a lake, although the moon itself is not in the night sky. The sounds of nocturnal birds are heard. Caino, who is young and black, enters from the right. He looks out over the lake and sits in the lotus position.

Eve approaches in a boat from far across the lake. Elu and Lufa are playing long notes as they stand behind her. The women wear transparent dresses, and the boat stops just offshore. Eve lifts her dress as she wades ashore. The boat moves further out as Eve meets Caino. She sits in his lap, with her legs embracing his hips. They sing together as Elu and Lufa accompany them from the boat.

Eve summons the boat and wades out to it. She sits down with her back to Caino, who watches the boat sail away. He exits to the right.

As the boat disappears, a terrifying unseen tenor voice yells, "Eve—our children!" A bright red streak shoots down from the sky, across the lake, and across the audience out the front door and remains visible.

==== Children's War ====
The sound of children's voices is heard approaching from offstage. They are singing and shouting. The white children enter from the left wearing military outfits and carrying toy weapons. They race repeatedly over to the right side of the stage and return to the left as they make noises with their weapons. In one rush, they exit entirely to the right, and return onstage battling the black children, who are fighting with simpler weapons (spears, bows, etc.). The war reaches a fever pitch, and the black children look beaten. They signal for help and a giant winged rhinoceros enters from the right. Four boys ride on its back and shoot arrows at the white children. The rhinoceros charges around the battlefield and spits fire. Eve flies in to protect her children. The white children fly away with Eve as the black children and the rhinoceros chase them offstage to the left. The sounds of the battle die away.

==== Repentance ====
Eve, Elu and Lufa arise from the lake and fly to the shore. Eve kneels on the spot where she had sex with Caino. She sings while making prayer gestures. As she sings, she thinks of her master (Michael) and her husband (Adam). Her song brings her forgiveness from God, and the three disappear.

==== Elufa ====
After the final "sound scene", Elu and Lufa enter from the left as they play. They converse about what has happened through their instruments. All 12 couples watch in fascination. In the middle of their duet, Lufa looks at all 12 couples and asks, "Do you repent?" All 12 couples shout together "Yes, we repent!"

==== Choir Spiral ====
After Elu and Lufa have exited, the six hybrid couples from the sound scenes (see below) with their candles assemble into a towering candle form. As they sing Choir Spiral, the large flame they have created ascends in a slow spiral pattern and disappears into Heaven.

=== Friday Farewell ===
Duration: 78.5 minutes

The electronic music from the opera is played in the lobby as the audience exits the theater. The lobby is engulfed in a thick orange mist. The music fades out after the audience has left.

=== Sound Scenes ===
(These events occur simultaneously with Acts I & II)

There are 12 couples (see above) of male and female partners played by dancers. Each couple has its own music, text, and pattern of sexual intercourse which should be recognizable as such to the audience.

After Fall, the couples begin to swap partners:

- sound scene 8: the cat partners with the man; woman with the dog
- sound scene 9: the typewriter partners with the racing car; racing car driver with the photocopy machine
- sound scene 10: the pinball machine player partners with the soccer ball; kicking leg with the pinball machine
- sound scene 11: the rocket partners with the woman's arm; drug syringe to the moon
- sound scene 12a: the pencil partners with the woman's mouth; ice-cream cone with the pencil sharpener
- sound scene 12b: the violin bow partners with the nest; the raven with the violin

Each exchange of partners is followed by the appearance of a hybrid couple in a candle flame between the other couples:

- 1st couple: naked woman with dog's head/man with a cat's body
- 2nd couple: female car with typewriter as a breast/racing car driver in a photocopy machine
- 3rd couple: female pinball machine with kicking leg as lower part of her body/pinball machine player with soccer ball as lower part of his body
- 4th couple: female moon with drug syringe piercing her body/man rocket with woman's arm as lower part of his body
- 5th couple: woman's mouth with pencil/electric pencil sharpener man with ice-cream cone bee
- 6th couple: female nest with violin bow crotch/male raven with cello as lower part of his body

The hybrid couples are portrayed by vocalists who sing along with the electronic music until the Choir Spiral, using tuning forks to orient themselves to the proper pitch because of the density of the other musical activity.

== Critical reception ==
Gérard Condé wrote in Le Monde about how the requirements of the Light cycle forced the composer into a cloister of sorts,

This quest for perfection, a complete fulfillment of the artistic gesture from its conception to its implementation, against the tide of the entire musical practice, gradually shut the composer in a superb isolation, which resembles a prison. Opponents see it as the culmination of a paranoid megalomaniac, yet Stockhausen continues to fascinate, to open doors into the unknown with wonder.

Writing for The Sunday Times, Paul Driver also cited the megalomania of Licht and Stockhausen's 'obsession with control', but his review was favorable overall:

I found that there was something grand and stirring about it all, despite the apparent puerility. Stockhausen, like Blake's fool, persists in his puerility and grows wise. His live music, when clearly apprehensible, as in the writing for children, is compellingly strange: disjunctive yet flavoursome; not exactly tonal nor atonal nor modal; always quasi-electronically sliding in pitch. The actual electronics are often breathtaking, the visual extravagance likewise. The kids, from local schools, were brilliant. Old modernist that he is, Stockhausen is still worth watching.

Stockhausen's former assistant Richard Toop wrote for The Sydney Morning Herald,

Clearly, there's something here to drive virtually everyone with a political correctness hobbyhorse into a frenzy: this is probably one reason why Leipzig is so far the only German opera house to commit itself to the LICHT cycle. German critics in particular, many of whom still seem ideologically ensnared in post-'68 nostalgia, and for whom Stockhausen clearly exists only as something to be offended by, regularly get steamed up about the "renunciation of reason" in the LICHT cycle, to a degree that itself seems irrational.

This seems to me to involve a certain hypocrisy, or at very least a double standard. It's quite clear what the function of music is for Stockhausen these days: it's not just art (that too) but a means of raising human consciousness to a cosmic level, through stage presentations which synthesise old myths and seek to create new ones. Now, do we expect the Odyssey, or the Ramayana, or even the Old Testament, to be politically correct?

Toop also takes pains to point out that all four performances were sold out, concluding "So much for the unmarketability of new opera".

== Individual works from Freitag ==
- Children's Choir for 8- or 2-track tape, multiple voices, bass (also conducting), synthesizer, sound projectionist (1994) [9 min 30 s]
- Children's Orchestra for 8- or 2-track tape, multiple instruments, soprano (also conducting), flute, basset-horn, synthesizer, sound projectionist (1994) [6 min]
- Kinder-Tutti (Children's Tutti) for 8- or 2-track tape, children's orchestra, children's choir, soprano (also conducting), bass, flute, basset-horn, synthesizer, sound projectionist (1994) [7 min]
- Kinder-Krieg (Children's War) for 8- or 2-track tape, children's choir, synthesizer, sound projectionist (1994) [12 min]
- Chor-Spiral (Choir Spiral) for 8- or 2-track tape, 12 singers (3S, 3A, 6B), sound projectionist (1994) [8 min]
- Komet als Klavierstück XVII (Comet, as Piano Piece XVII) for 8- or 2-track tape, electronic keyboard, sound projectionist, 7 1/2 ex Nr. 64 (1999) [ca. 15 min]
- Komet (Comet) for 8- or 2-track tape, percussionist, sound projectionist, 7 2/3 ex Nr. 64 (1999) [ca. 15 min]
- Zustimmung (Consent) for 8- or 2-track tape, soprano, bass, flute, basset-horn, sound projectionist (1994) [9 min]
- Paare vom Freitag (Couples from Friday) with soprano, bass & electronic instruments (on tape), Nr. 63 (1999) [ca. 65 min]
- Electronic Music with Sound Scenes of Friday from Light for 24-track electronic music (1994) [ca. 145 min]
- Elufa for basset-horn and flute (2-track tape optional) (1991) [7 min 30 s]
- Fall for 8- or 2-track tape, soprano, baritone, flute, basset-horn, sound projectionist (1994) [18 min]
- Freia for basset-horn (1991) [7 min]
- Freia for flute (1991) [7 min]
- Freitags-Gruss (Friday Greeting) and Freitags-Abschied (Friday Farewell) for 8-track electronic music (1991–92/94), Nr. 62 [ca. 68 min 30 s + ca. 78 min] together = Weltraum (Outer Space) for 8-track electronic music (1991–92/1994) [ca. 146 min]
- Klavierstück XVI for 12-track tape, stringed piano, electronic keyboards ad lib., sound projectionist (1995) [ca. 7 min]
- Antrag (Proposal) for 8-track tape, soprano, bass, flute, basset-horn (1994) [12 min 30 s]
- Reue (Repentance) for 2-track tape, soprano, flute, basset-horn, sound projectionist (1994) [10 min]
- Two Couples, for 2-track electronic and concrete music, Nr. 63 2/3 (1992/1999) [21 min] (music for the film In Absentia, by Stephen and Timothy Quay)
- Vibra-Elufa for vibraphone [7 min]
