= Unsichtbare Chöre =

German music composition

Unsichtbare Chöre (Invisible Choirs) is an eight-channel electronic-music composition by Karlheinz Stockhausen. A component part of the opera Donnerstag aus Licht (1977-80), it may also be performed as an independent composition, in which form it is designated "ex 49" in the composer's catalog of works (where Nr. 49 is Michaels Jugend, act 1 of the opera).

== Function in Donnerstag ==
The opera Donnerstag aus Licht concerns the development of the earthly life of young Michael. He personifies a divine spirit capable of achieving immortality and absolute knowledge, who discovers beyond death a supraconsciousness that protects him from the anti-knowledge of Lucifer. The Invisible Choirs represent the divine immanence, disembodied and beyond logic, activated like a mantra that forces Michael into transcendence. It is played back on tape over eight groups of loudspeakers, set in a circle around the audience. It sounds softly in the background throughout the first scene, "Childhood", of act 1 (Michael's Youth), and rather louder during "Festival", the opening scene of act 3 (Michael's Homecoming).

== Text ==
The work sets three texts in Hebrew ("Judgement Day" from The Ascent of Moses, "The End of Time" from the Apocalypse of Baruch, and a Hymn of Praise, "The Heavens Rejoice", from the Book of Leviticus), and a different passage from "The End of Time", sung in German. deliberately selecting the "positive, creative, and invigorating" passages and avoiding the "gruesome" segments that "describe drastic things, that speak of blood and destruction".

== Materials and technique ==
A click track was recorded on the sixteenth track of a sixteen-track tape recorder. This was used to synchronise the choir, who were recorded separately by sections, with each voice group (sopranos, altos, tenors, and basses) superimposed on itself as many as four times. From this fifteen-track version, Stockhausen then mixed down an eight-track version, in the process changing the positions of the choir groups in space. The result could never be performed by a choir live, with as many as 180 separate vocal parts synchronised at some points.

== Discography ==
- Stockhausen: Unsichtbare Chöre / Invisible Choirs / Chœurs invisibles. WDR Rundfunkchor Köln, Herbert Schernus, Gottfried Ritter, and Karlheinz Stockhausen (preparation); Suzanne Stephens (clarinets); Karlheinz Stockhausen (musical direction and sound projection). Deutsche Grammophon LP 419-432-1; CD 419 432–2. Hamburg: Polydor International, 1986. Reissued Stockhausen Complete Edition CD 31. Kürten: Stockhausen-Verlag, 1992. Excerpt reissued on Schöpfung und Erschöpfung. Musik in Deutschland 1950–2000: Musiktheater: Porträt. BMG Classics RCA Red Seal CD 74321 73635 2. [Germany]: BMG Ariola Classics; Deutscher Musikrat; [N.p.]: RCA Red Seal, 2003.
