= Trans (Stockhausen composition) =

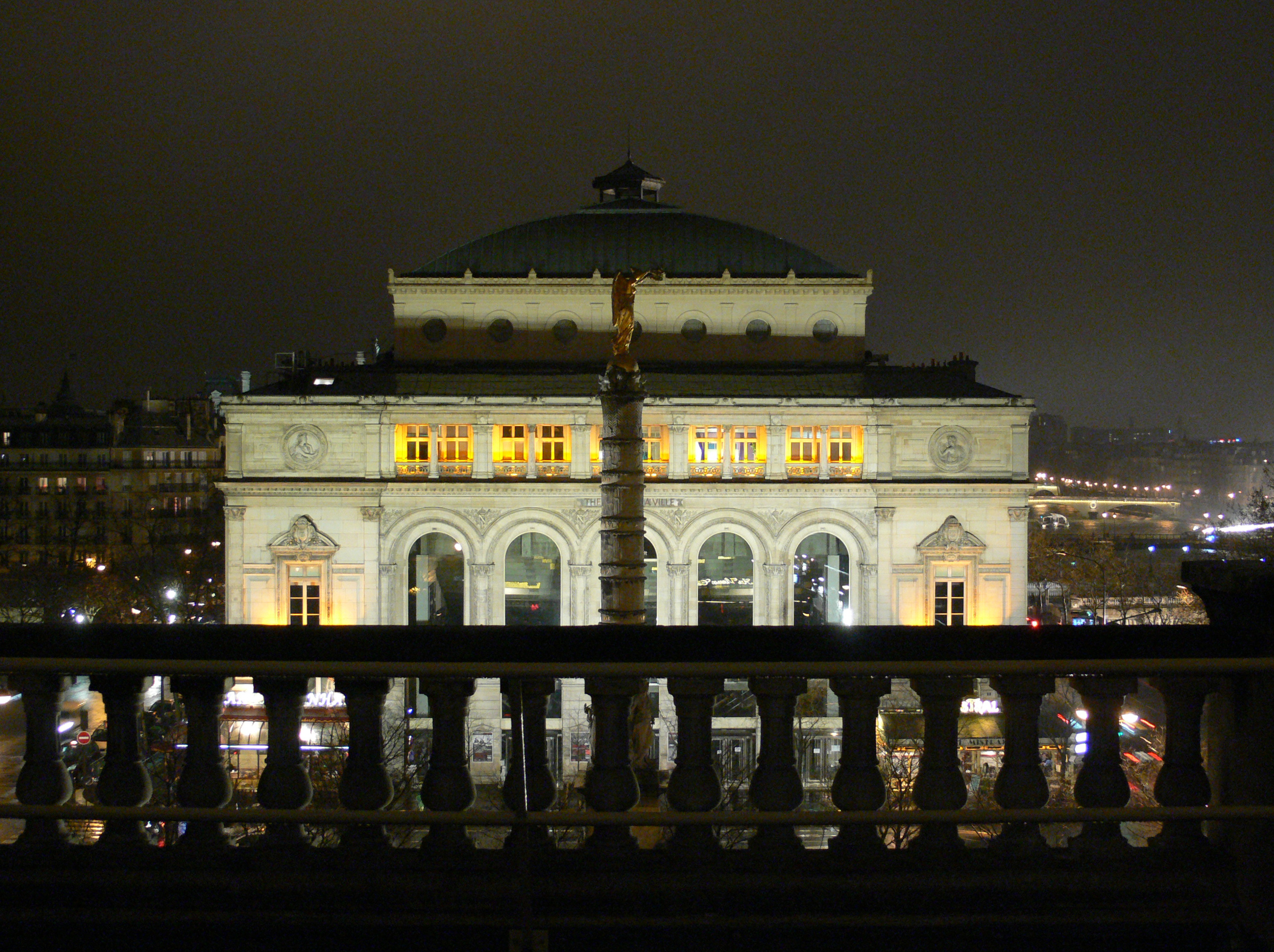
Théâtre de la Ville, Paris: site of the first French performance of Trans, ten days after the Donaueschingen world premiere in October 1971

Trans is a composition for orchestra and tape by the German composer Karlheinz Stockhausen, written in 1971. It is Number 35 in the composer's catalog of works.

Trans is as much a work of theatre as it is a musical composition. It has a somnolent, irrational look and feel, for the simple reason that it is the representation of a dream. Stockhausen regarded it as an important work for himself, a key work and a whole new beginning—a "transcendental piece".

== Origin ==
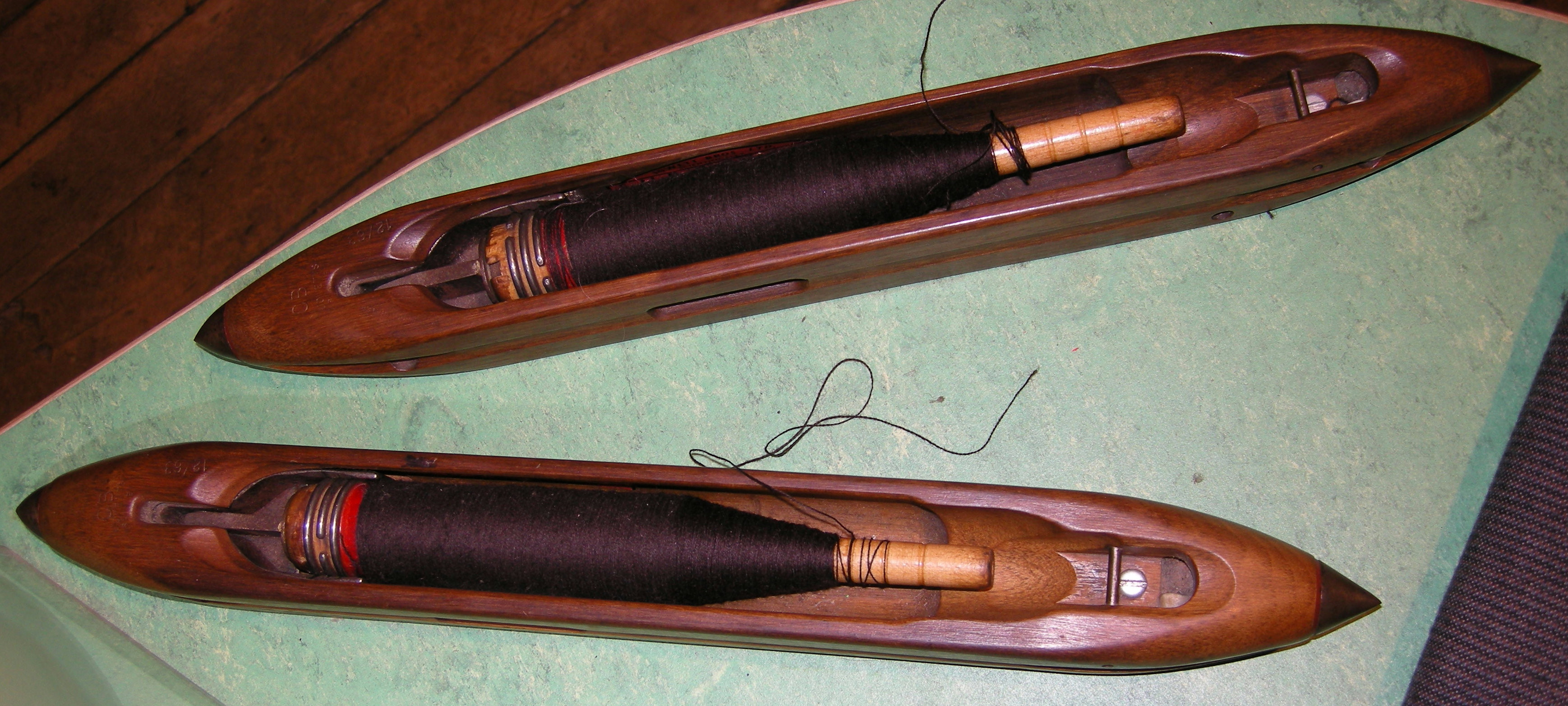
Loom shuttles, source of the form-marking sounds in Trans

The overall course of the entire piece came to Stockhausen in a dream during the night of 9–10 December 1970. In the morning, he had an early appointment, but took the time to jot down briefly in words what he had heard and seen: "Dreamt orchestral work ... orchestra sits in series ... sound wall opens with different intervals at periods of about twenty seconds, allowing music behind this wall to come through—brass and woodwinds mixed—and I hear low instruments that are the fundamentals; in timbres they're colored like organ mixtures. With each low melodic line of one of the lower instruments there are several instruments in parallel, playing softer and coloring this low sound ... at the same time I hear the sound of a weaving chair". When he was asked by the head of the Studio for Electronic Music, Otto Tomek, to compose a piece for the Donaueschingen Festival the next October, Stockhausen first arranged to make some experiments for staging, lighting, and performing action in the hall there. Only after these were carried out in May and June 1971 did he begin composing the score (on 17 July). It was completed on 4 September, and the premiere took place in the Donaueschingen Stadthalle on 16 October 1971.

Stockhausen considered titling the work Jenseits (The Other Side) or Musik für die nächsten Toten (Music for the Next to Die), with the subtitle "Requiem for the Orchestra", before finally deciding on Trans, which means "across", but also suggests "trance" as well as words like "transition" and "transcendental".

On the day following the world premiere of Trans, a panel discussion was presented at Donaueschingen on the "Symphony Orchestra in a Changed World". Stockhausen participated in this discussion, contributing some characteristically provocative remarks. He held that that mentality of orchestral musicians has been reduced to that of the factory worker "who works only by the clock". They are no longer psychically prepared for their tasks and are frustrated as artists, having become just small cogs in a massive and confusing apparatus, completely deprived of their individuality. He blamed this condition not least on the protected, tenured status brought about by the collective bargaining politics of the unions, and proposed for the top musicians in each orchestra a two-month annual training course to update their skills. Needless to say, the response from orchestra managers was not overwhelmingly enthusiastic, but it did seem that Stockhausen was representing the struggle against this alleged "squad mentality" in his composition.

== Stage action ==
Trans deliberately confounds the expectations of the conventional audience-orchestra dynamic by introducing ambiguities such as the suppression of normal visual cues, an invisible conductor, and—with the exception of the interpolated cadenzas—no visible performer movements. When the curtain rises, the audience sees only the string section, in conventional concert attire, seated in two long rows (the second raised on a riser) behind a scrim lit with red-violet light. Stockhausen was very particular about the colour of this light: a violet hue interwoven with a red-to-yellowish hue that he had only ever seen in nature during a night-time flight from Copenhagen to Tokyo over the North Pole. The rest of the orchestra is concealed backstage, behind a half-wall. The music played by this visible instrumental group forms the slow, chordal "screen" over the invisible, more active layer played by the winds and percussion, who are concealed in the back half of the stage. The strings play impassively and rigidly, like puppets or automatons, with totally synchronised bow-movements. As in the composer's dream, every twenty seconds or so the sound of an old-fashioned loom shuttle shoots invisibly through the air in the hall from left to right. With each stroke of the shuttle, the strings begin a new note. Stockhausen had seen such looms used in Bali in 1970, and the sound also evoked childhood memories of the railroad switches his uncle had operated. These shuttle sounds were recorded for the piece by Stockhausen's assistant in a small village in southern Germany. Toward the end, a startling moment occurs, when the hitherto rigid players suddenly start to sway around, in imitation of conventionally "expressive" string playing, only as mechanically synchronised as ever.

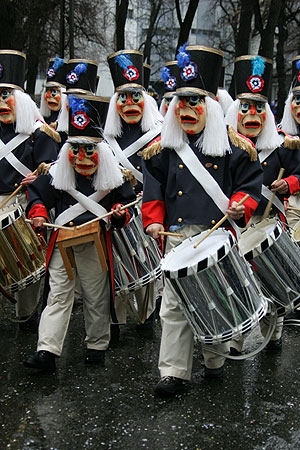
Basel Fasnacht drums

This visual rigidity is interrupted from time to time (in fact at the joins between the six main structural sections) by theatrical cadenzas, seemingly in reaction to the tension of the string players having to sit and play like zombies. First, a percussionist marches slowly onstage with a "Basel drum", like the ones still played in the Basel Fasnacht, and with a single loud stroke on the drum prompts the first violist to break into a berserk cadenza, quelled by the next shuttle-loom stroke. Then a stagehand brings out a music stand for the first cello, who plays an impassioned romantic solo, switched on and off by the light on the music stand. A little later, the concertmaster abruptly stands up and, as if in response to cramp, begins a nervous twitching on a single high note, bringing the entire orchestra to a stop. The string players all lean toward him and glare with reproach, and the rogue violinist, averting his gaze, meekly returns to his routine task. At the beginning of part V, a solo trumpet appears in midair (actually by climbing a ladder behind the concealing wall) and plays a joyful reveille call, ending with a flatulent fluttertongued note, in the spirit of Richard Strauss's Till Eulenspiegel. The final interpolation, however, is an abrupt cessation of all sound for the better part of a minute, an intimidating "silent cadenza", marked at the centre by a triple shuttle stroke in a dotted-rhythm figure. The music then resumes to conclude the work with a dignified chorale-like coda, reminiscent of the ending of Stravinsky's Symphonies of Wind Instruments.

The winds, divided into four groups, are out of sight but play the real musical substance of Trans, dividing and re-combining in an attempt to assert themselves and break through into the listeners's consciousness. The music is heard therefore despite the players who are visible, rather than because of them; the strings are more of a visual and acoustical obstruction to the music than its essence. Stockhausen sought in this way to pose a metaphysical situation, inasmuch as the audience is made to feel "the important thing is there in the back, but it cannot be seen", and so the listener is constantly confronted with the question of whether the sound being heard is from an orchestra that is merely being played back from a recording, or one that truly is there.

Over the course of the work the dramatic balance significantly changes from the initial situation of conflict (which the composer characterized as "tragic") toward an increasingly "comic" dialogue between the concealed and the revealed.

== Musical form and content ==
The early sketches for Trans show that Stockhausen initially considered using the formula technique he had recently (and very successfully) developed for Mantra. In the end, however, he decided against it, and settled instead on a simple pitch sequence of thirty-six notes without formal or rhythmic implications, which is "treated with inspired flexibility", first a twelve-tone row in a sharply falling contour, and then a gradually rising, winding chromatic line.

The music consists of three main layers, differentiated by audible characteristics, but in part by the visual aspects as well. The first layer is played back invisibly on tape in the theatre, and consists of the loudly amplified sound of a loom shuttle crossing the room, left-to-right and right-to-left, at first occurring at nearly periodic intervals of about 20 seconds. Over the course of the piece the intervals between these sounds deviate increasingly from this average, following a systematic process. These sounds mark off segments of the music similar to the colotomic percussion signals used in some Asian musics, such as Japanese gagaku. Stockhausen had used this device previously in Mantra and Telemusik. There are 33 of these smaller subsections, grouped into six large sections, with a clear evolutionary process. The shuttle-loom sounds also indicate the structural levels, according to whether they occur singly, in pairs, or—at the dividing points between the six main sections of the work—in threes.

Each of the four concealed wind groups consists of a bass instrument, which plays either a fundamental tone or a second or fourth harmonic above a virtual fundamental, and four treble instruments that provide a cluster of higher harmonics. For example, the first subsection has the central tone E, initially expressed as a fundamental tone on the second E below the bass clef (41.25 Hz), which is the lowest note of the contrabass. Above this the four flutes of group I play harmonics 14, 15, 16, and 18, giving way to a second chord in the four oboes of group II, playing harmonics 13, 15, 16, and 19. The fundamental note then drops by an octave, so that the sounding bass E becomes a second harmonic, with the four clarinets of group III playing harmonics 16, 17, 21, and 22. The low E then becomes a fourth harmonic of an implied fundamental yet another octave lower, at 10.3 Hz, and the cup-muted trumpets in group IV play harmonics 20, 21, 23, and 28. The behaviour of these harmonic tones, which roughly parallel the bass-tone fundamentals, resembles early medieval organum, but appears to be modelled on organ mixture stops, rather than on the formant resonances of the human voice, which remain in the same frequency zone while the fundamentals change below.

Because the winds and percussion are concealed from view (apart from the brief appearances of the solo trumpet and the military drummer), Stockhausen wondered whether people could tell the difference if those parts were just played back on tape. Even though he believed that it would matter, at least during inspired interpretations, he authorised performances in which the wind-instrument parts are played back from a recording. Understandably, given the economics of rehearsals and tight deadlines, orchestras have overwhelmingly opted for the pre-recorded winds. Such performances are not entirely without their dangers, however. In 1987, Stockhausen criticised one of them for over-amplification, distorted playback, poor balance, and unnaturally strong high frequencies. The technicians in charge complained bitterly that the tape was defective, possibly due to copies made without using the correct noise-reduction equalisation, though they had taken no steps to obtain a better copy. Stockhausen also considered it possible that the inputs to the sound-mixing board may have been over-driven.)

== Reception ==
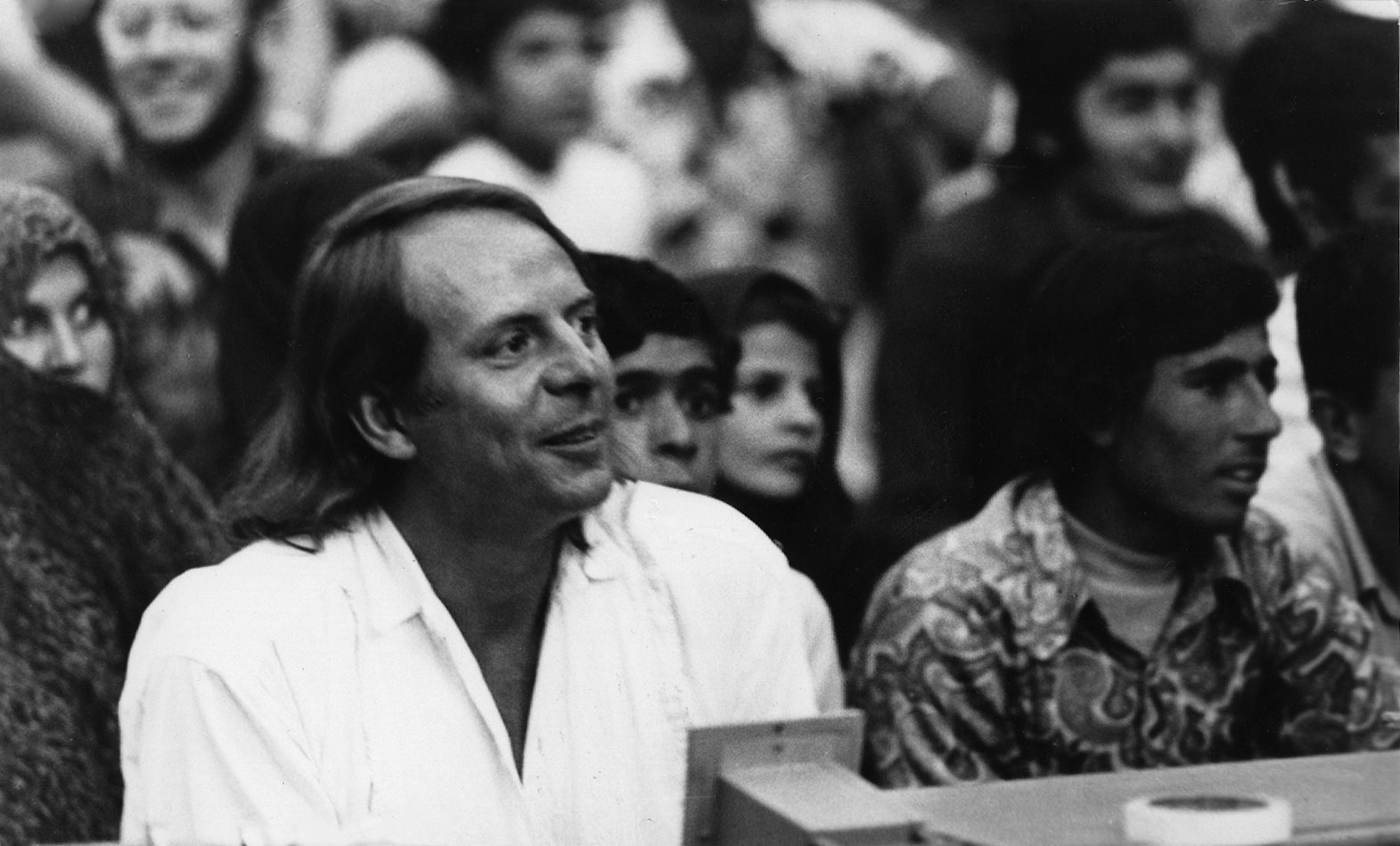
Stockhausen, Shiraz Arts Festival, 2 September 1972

The audience reactions at the world premiere can be heard on the published recording, where parts of the public are clearly provoked. However, at Donaueschingen and Darmstadt in those days it was fashionable—as it had been earlier in Paris and Vienna—to boo in order to be seen booing. It was much the same ten days later at the Théâtre de la Ville in Paris, when Trans was performed twice by the Orchestra of the Conservatory under the direction of Alain Louvrier. It was met with a storm of both applause and protest from a sold-out, youthful audience – or, as phrased by a less enthusiastic critic: "it received ... only a mixed reception". Just two years later, at a performance of Trans in Metz in November 1973, there was no such audience hostility. Today, the outraged protests in the recording of the world premiere, predictably most vehement during the extremely long, intimidating silence toward the end (punctuated in the middle by a triple shuttle-loom stroke), open a window to the past, as if the listener now is experiencing the work in reality from "the other side".

Reviews have focussed on the theatrical elements, rather than on the music per se—understandably, since Trans is not intended as a concert piece, but rather is an experience that sets its own standards. One critic, writing of the 1973 Metz performance, pronounced it "very good theatre", a "beautifully and absorbingly done" transcription of dream to performance, possessing "the lunatic coherence that one recognizes in one's own dreams". A review of the 1971 Paris performance found the "strange haze of violent [sic] light", the hidden winds, the crack of the shuttle, and generally surrealist character to have an intense imaginative life. The staging has been described as an "intensely physical", multilayered experience that draws the listener through a perceptual gateway into "a mysterious auditory hinterland", suggesting Hamlet-like resignation less than the haunting pessimism of Francis Bacon.

Critics are rarely unanimous, however. For example, when Trans was played in November 2008 at Queen Elizabeth Hall in London (twice on the same programme), one journalist dismissed it as "inane play-acting", "the kind of piece Ligeti might have brought off with scathing wit" but in Stockhausen's hands merely an example of "trying on the emperor's new clothes". By contrast, another found Stockhausen to be "clearly in territory that was utterly and crazily his own" and the work "staged with properly mystifying flair". For a third, Trans was "The highlight of the weekend, ... precise and carefully composed, ... a musical ceremonial that was grand, playful and touching at once".

== Discography ==
- Stockhausen, Karlheinz. Trans (Uraufführung); Trans (Studioaufnahme). Sinfonieorchester des Südwestfunks Baden-Baden, Ernest Bour, conductor (world premiere, 16 October 1971, in Donaueschingen); Rundfunk-Sinfonieorchester Saarbrücken, Hans Zender, conductor (studio recording, January 1974). LP recording. Deutsche Grammophon 2530 726. [Hamburg]: Deutsche Grammophon, 1976. Reissued on CD. Stockhausen Gesamtausgabe 19. Kürten: Stockhausen-Verlag, 1992.

== Filmography ==
- Trans ... und so weiter: ein Film mit Karlheinz Stockhausen. Gérard Patris (dir.). Colour, 58' 43". Germany: Saarländischer Rundfunk; Zweites Deutsches Fernsehen, 1973. DVD release, Kürten, Germany: Stockhausen-Verlag, 2006.
