= Ylem (Stockhausen) =

1972 musical composition

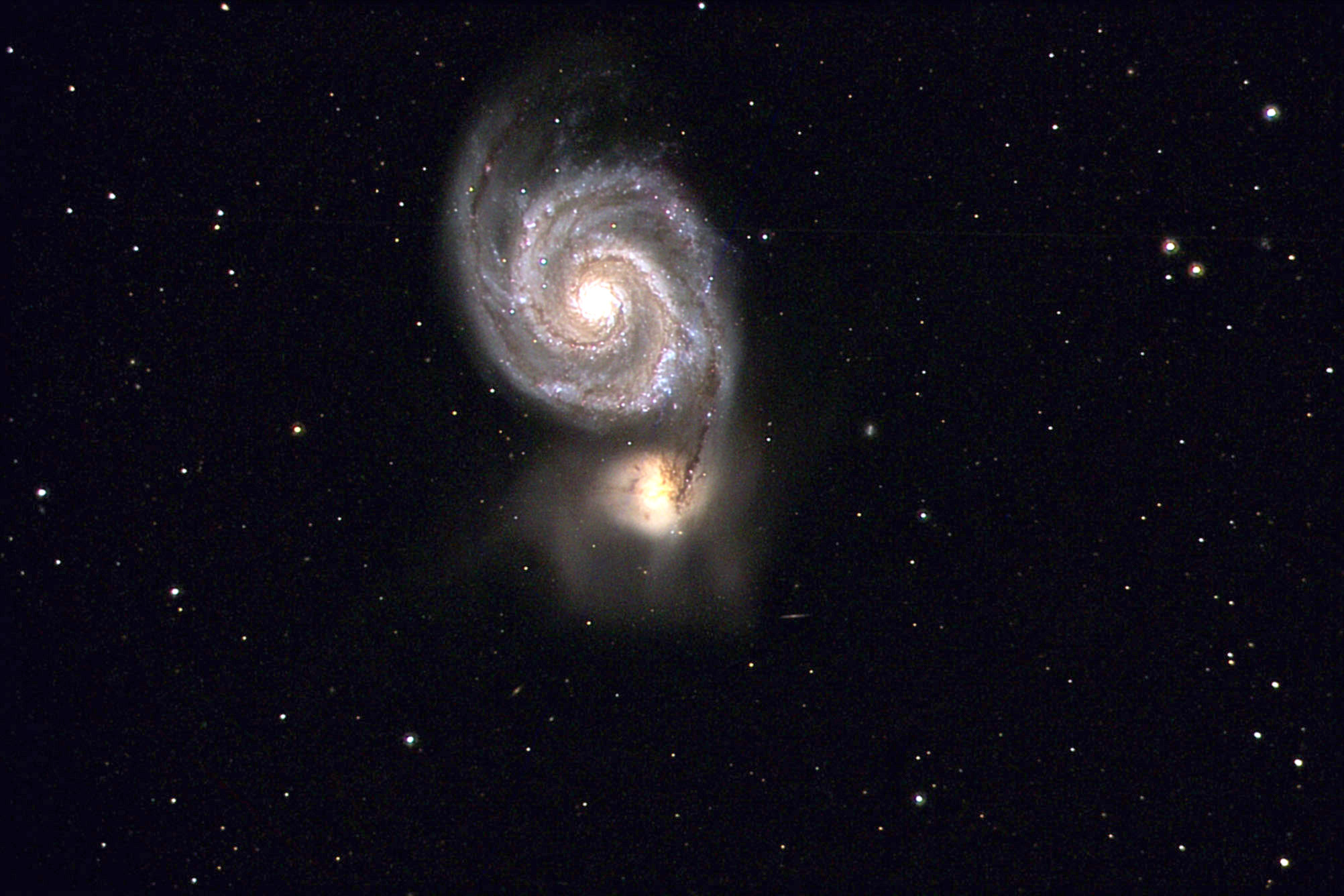
Whirlpool Galaxy in Canes Venatici, a photograph of which illustrates the CD booklet for Ylem

Ylem is a composition by Karlheinz Stockhausen for a variable ensemble of 19 or more players, and is given the work number 37 in his catalogue of compositions.

== History ==
Ylem is "phoenix music", in that it represents the continual rebirth of the universe, according to the theory of the oscillating universe, which holds that the universe periodically explodes every 80,000,000,000 years.

The title of the work is taken from the term ylem, a word used in medieval Latin, the accusative of the borrowed Greek term hylē (ὕλη, "matter"), and adopted in the 1940s by the physicists George Gamow and Ralph Alpher to refer to the essential material of the universe, in the context of the "Big Bang theory. The subject of the composition is, in short, "the 'breath' of the universe".

The score is dedicated to the composer's son Simon, who was five years old at the time of composition. It was composed in December 1972 for a tour with the London Sinfonietta, who gave the premiere on 9 March 1973 under the composer's direction, at the Queen Elizabeth Hall, Southbank Centre, London. The next evening, the same forces rehearsed and performed the piece on a live television broadcast from 10:50 to 11:30 pm on BBC2's Full House, hosted by John Bird, with questions from the studio audience and phoned in by viewers. Three studio recordings of this version were made on 21 March 1973 in the EMI Studios, London.

== Analysis ==
The formal process of Ylem is notated verbally. It requires a great deal of imagination from performers but is very simple in conception, consisting of the very slow attenuation and compression of a galaxy of musical points. At the beginning, ten of the mobile performers stand close to the piano. After an initial explosive sound (on E♭ and A in the London version) these ten players move out into the hall, playing all the while, and take up positions around the audience, while the other players remain on the stage. This phase takes about eleven minutes, during which the players move their individual notes away from their starting pitches. At the same time, they diminish in volume and frequency of attacks, occasionally forming short melodic groups and increasingly are varied by trills and glissandos. Toward the end, the mobile performers return to the piano and a second explosion occurs, after which all 19 players (the nine fixed-position players now switching to small portable instruments) disperse again through the hall and out of the building.

In the London recordings, this second explosion is a tone higher than the first. The composer held that the music works best "when the players establish telepathic communication with one another (they play with closed eyes) and with a 'conductor' who listens with the utmost concentration from the middle of the hall, but does not take an active part".

== Reception ==
British journalists reviewing the world premiere expressed a mixture of bewilderment and scorn. Writing in The Times, Stanley Sadie said, "Criticism is impotent on such a work as this; there is nothing to do but describe". He nevertheless concluded by comparing Ylem unfavourably to earlier works by the composer on the programme (Kreuzspiel, Zeitmaße, and Kontra-Punkte), which "made his latest piece sound, rightly or wrongly, like Nirvana-hungry doodlings". Paul Griffiths felt that the newest work on the programme, Ylem, "provided the least newness". Although "there was occasional interest in the responding calls across the hall … the overall process is simplistic—an idea that could well have been left to Xenakis".

Where Sadie found contrasts to Stockhausen's earlier works, New Zealand composer and writer Robin Maconie perceives similarities: Spiel (1952), Gruppen (1955–57), Kontakte (1958–60), Momente (1962–64/69), the moment titled "Translation" in Mixtur (1964), Adieu (1966), the "Russian Bridge" in the Third Region of Hymnen with orchestra (1966–67/69), Intervall for piano four-hands (1969), and the Dr K–Sextett (1969) all share with Ylem the technique of gradual dispersal or condensation (or both) of constellations of tones.

American film and television critic David Lavery's response to what he calls "the strangest piece of program music ever composed" was more visceral:

When I first listened to Stockhausen's Ylem, I was, at its close, nearly unable to move; the music seemed almost to have disintegrated my ordinary molecular structure, replacing it with its own aleatory form, and I waited a few moments before I attempted to move, as if I felt the need to reassemble my body.

Explaining his personal reaction in the context of a recurring childhood nightmare of nothingness, Lavery invokes a similar idea underlying H. P. Lovecraft's short story "The Music of Erich Zann" and sensations described in passages from Georges Poulet, Rainer Maria Rilke, Herman Melville, Claude Lévi-Strauss, Paul Valéry, R. Murray Schafer, and the Śūraṅgama Sūtra. Finding that Ylem represents the Vedic "unstruck sound of the celestial realm" or anahata nad, Lavery concludes that it is representative of Stockhausen's moment form, "music made out of nothing, one of Stockhausen's most effective attempts to create a 'sequence of silences'".

The 1973 BBC broadcast inspired the then 15-year old Andrew Ford to become a composer.

== Discography ==
- Karlheinz Stockhausen: Stop for Orchestra, London Version 1973; Ylem for 19 Players, First London Version 1973. London Sinfonietta; Karlheinz Stockhausen (dir.). LP recording. Deutsche Grammophon 2530 442. [Germany]: Deutsche Grammophon, 1974.
- Stockhausen: Ylem: 2 Versionen, 1973. London Sinfonietta; Karlheinz Stockhausen (dir.). Recorded 21 March 1973, second and third versions. CD recording. Stockhausen Complete Edition CD 21. Kürten: Stockhausen-Verlag, 1992
