= Adieu (Stockhausen) =

Musical composition by Karlheinz Stockhausen

Adieu für Wolfgang Sebastian Meyer is a composition for wind quintet by Karlheinz Stockhausen composed in 1966. It is Number 21 in the composer's catalog of works, and the second of Stockhausen's three wind quintets, the others being Zeitmaße (1955-1956) and the Rotary Wind Quintet (1997).

== History ==
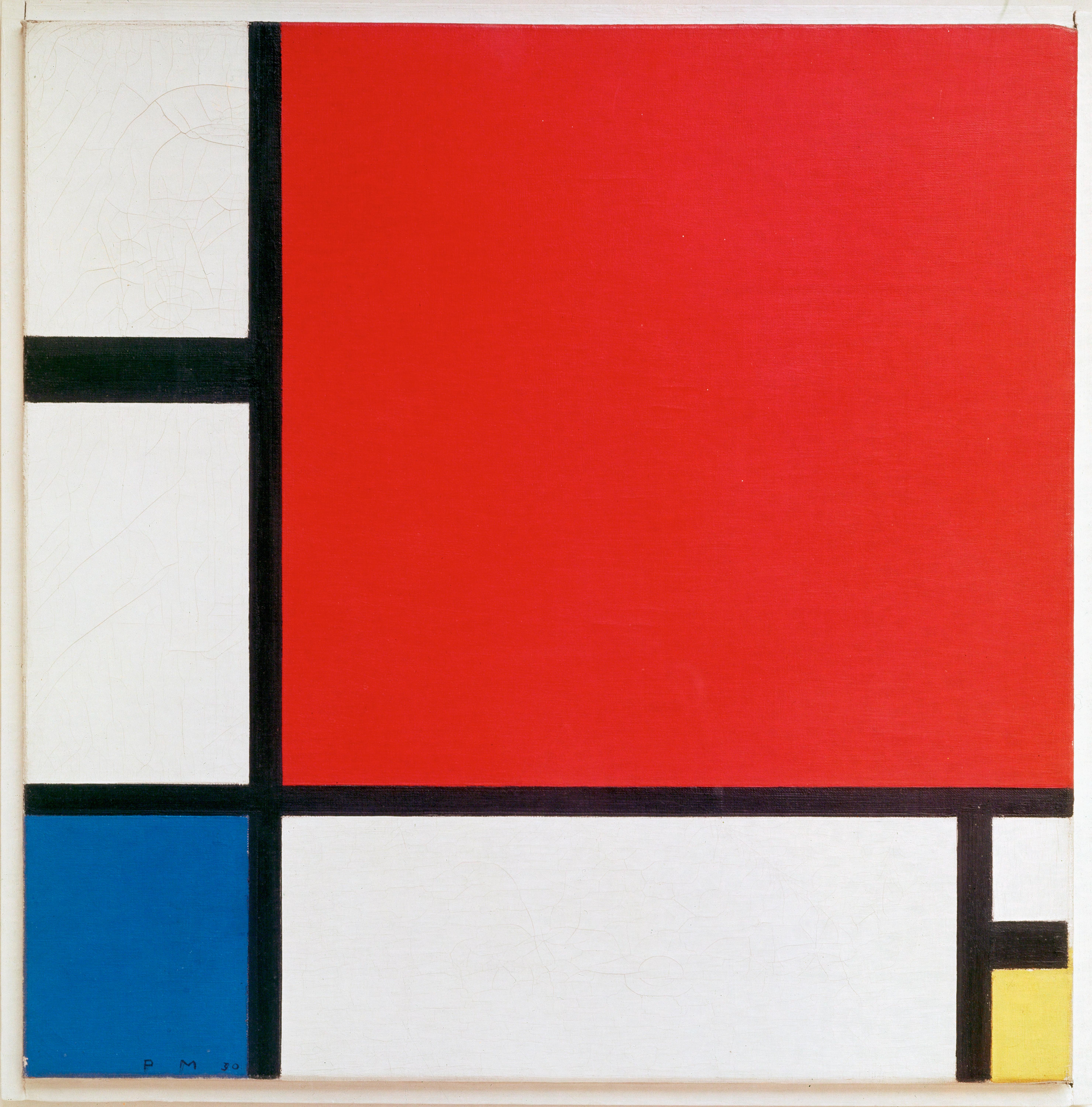
Mondrian, Composition II in Red, Blue, and Yellow

In June 1966 the oboist Wilhelm Meyer, who had frequently performed Stockhausen's earlier quintet Zeitmaße under the composer's direction, asked Stockhausen to compose a new wind quintet for an upcoming tour of Asia. Stockhausen initially demurred because a new quintet would probably take months to compose, and the current production of Hymnen in the Cologne electronic studio was taking up all of his time. A visit made a few days later to a comprehensive exhibition in The Hague of Piet Mondrian's paintings made Stockhausen ask himself, when confronted with Mondrian's well-known series of paintings titled simply "compositions"—with their strict organization by vertical and horizontal lines dividing the canvasses into rectangles—why it should be necessary to take months of concentrated work to produce a piece. Recalling also that Meyer's son Wolfgang Sebastian, an organist who not long before had asked Stockhausen to compose an organ piece, had been killed in a car crash on 10 January 1966, he immediately set to work on the new quintet in memory of the oboist's son, and completed it two days later. There were two unofficial performances, in Calcutta on 30 January and in Hong Kong on 6 February, before the "official premiere" on 10 February 1967 in Tokyo by the WDR Wind Quintet.

== Analysis ==
Adieu provokes reflection on the transience of experience by expressing feelings of separation and bereavement. This is accomplished through the use of long-held chords with microtonal fluctuations and gestures of interrupted movement—unfinished cadences, abrupt changes in the sound, and so on. "The musicians must be able to experience deeply, and form into notes, the sense of closeness to death that vibrates in this music".

The work is divided into sections proportioned according to the Fibonacci numbers from 1 to 144. The main material consists of long-drawn out, static or slowly changing sound expanses, interrupted at intervals by general pauses and five short, unfinished traditional tonal cadences, reminiscent of Mozart. These broken-off cadence fragments open and close Adieu, and divide the whole into four large sections of 144 time units each. The second and fourth of these main sections are subdivided by the pauses, resulting in a total of eight subsections, with durations of 144, 55 + 89, 144, and 34 + 21 + 34, + 55 units. These are then subdivided further into smaller measures. Each Fibonacci duration is associated throughout the composition with a particular articulation type. The value 13, for example, is associated with trills. However, when such a value is also a part of a larger one, e.g., when a section of 34 units is divided 13 + 21, the shorter section takes on in addition the character associated with 34, which is repetition of notes. On the other hand, where 13 combines with 8 to form a larger section of 21 units, the 13 bar will take on in addition to trills the character associated with 21, which is crescendo.

== Discography ==
- Stockhausen: Kreuzspiel, Kontra-Punkte, Zeitmaße, Adieu. London Sinfonietta (Sebastian Bell, flute; Janet Craxton, oboe; Antony Pay, clarinet; John Butterworth, horn; William Waterhouse, bassoon), Karlheinz Stockhausen, cond. LP recording. DG 2530 443. Hamburg: Deutsche Grammophon, 1974. Adieu reissued with Kontra-Punkte, Zeitmaße, and Stop on CD, Stockhausen Complete Edition CD 4. Kürten: Stockhausen-Verlag, 2002.
- Quintette Moraguès: Ligeti, Villa-Lobos, Barber, Hindemith, Stockhausen. Michel Moraguès, flute; David Walter, oboe; Pascal Moraguès, clarinet; Pierre Moraguès, horn; Patrick Vilaire, bassoon. Recorded October 1991. CD recording. Auvidis VALOIS V 4639. [France]: Auvidis France, 1992.
- German Wind Quintets. Quintette Aquilon (Marion Ralincourt, flute; Claire Sirjacobs, oboe; Stéphanie Corre, clarinet; Marianne Tilquin, horn; Gaêlle Habert, bassoon), Clément Mao-Takacs, cond. Stockhausen: Adieu; Klughardt: Wind Quintet in C, Op. 79; Hindemith: Kleine Kammermusik, Op. 24, No. 2; Eisler: Divertimento, Op. 4. Recorded at Siemensvilla, Berlin-Lankwitz, 13–16 August 2012. CD recording, 1 disc: digital, 12 cm, stereo. Delta Classics 90 094. Frechen: Delta Music & Entertainment GmbH & Co. KG, 2013.
