= Alphabet für Liège =

Composition by Karlheinz Stockhausen

Situation 9: harmonize the seven centres of the body (using mantra technique)

Alphabet für Liège, for soloists and duos, is a composition (or a musical installation) by Karlheinz Stockhausen, and is Work Number 36 in the composer's catalog of works. A performance of it lasts four hours.

The fundamental idea underlying Alphabet is the notion that sound vibrations can affect both living beings and inanimate matter. There are thirteen scenes, or musical images, each illustrating the physical effects of sound, ranging from making acoustic vibrations visible to a demonstration of Asian mantra techniques. These ideas were developed in conversations with the British biophysicist and lecturer on mystical aspects of sound vibration Jill Purce, who also called Stockhausen's attention to the work of Hans Jenny. In a radio interview three months before the premiere, Stockhausen explained his purpose was to show "how sound waves always change the molecules, even the atoms of a being who listens to music, making them vibrate. And that is what we want to make visible, because most people only believe what they see".

== History ==
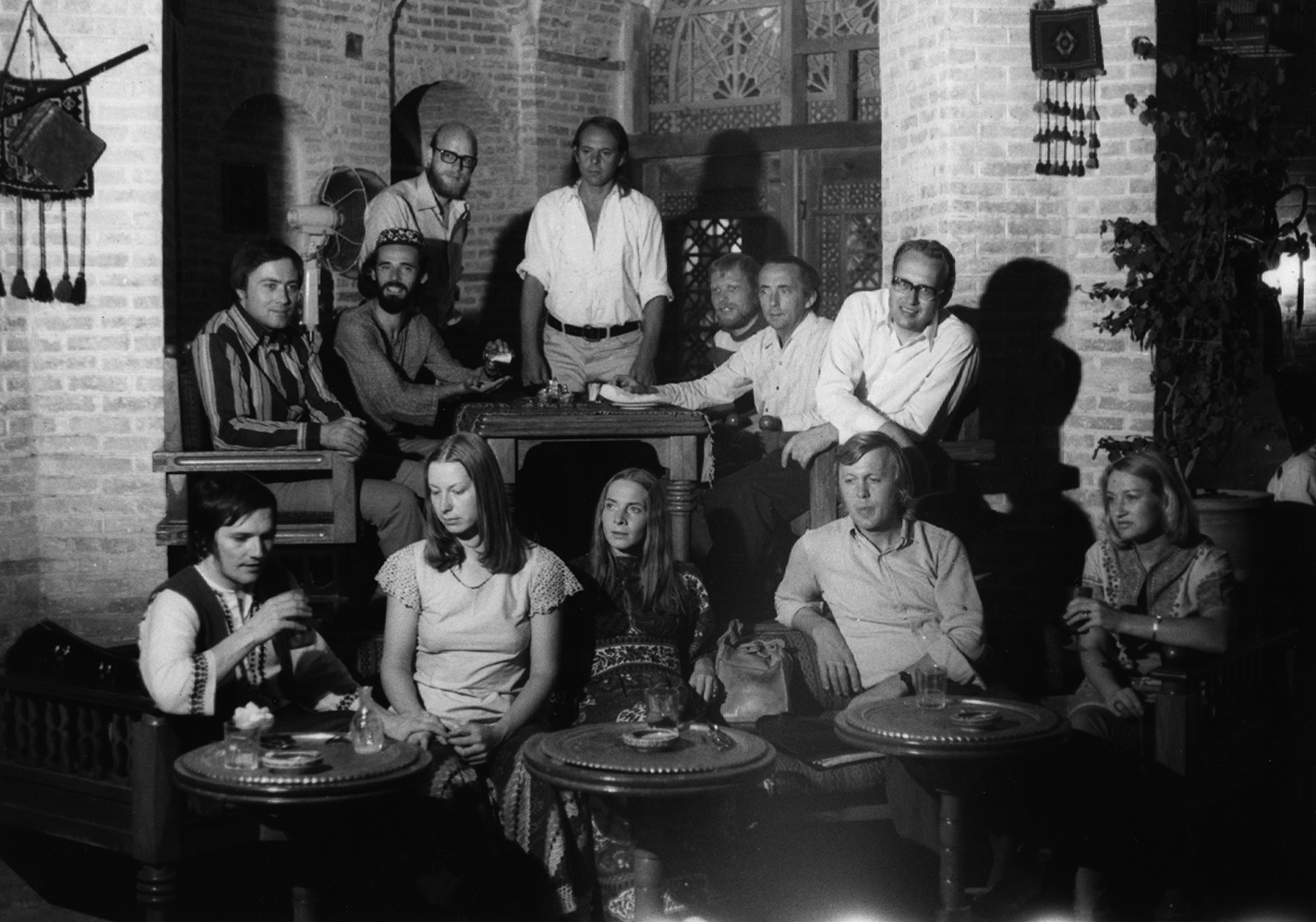
Volker Müller and Karlheinz Stockhausen (standing), Karl O. Barkey and Hans-Alderich Billig (seated, left rear), Wolfgang Lüttgen, Günther Engels, Christoph Caskel (seated, right rear), Péter Eötvös, Dagmar von Biel, Gaby Rodens, Wolfgang Fromme, and Helga Hamm-Albrecht (front), during the Shiraz Arts Festival, September 1972, three weeks before the premiere of Alphabet für Liège

Alphabet was created as a commission from the City of Liège on the initiative of Philippe Boesmans, for the Nuits de Septembre festival, and was premiered during a "Journée Karlheinz Stockhausen" on 23 September 1972. Stockhausen envisaged the work for performance in a labyrinth-like building. The venue chosen for the premiere consisted of fourteen still-empty areas, all leading off of a central corridor, in the basement level of the half-completed radio and television building in the Palais des congrès de Liège, before the wall coverings, doors, and office partitions had been installed. The bare concrete and breeze-block surfaces were whitewashed especially for the performance, and the rooms were all open to each other through open doors and windows. In this world premiere, only eleven of the thirteen situations were included. Performers included members of the British instrumental group Gentle Fire (Hugh Davies, Michael Robinson, Richard Bernas, Stuart Jones), five of the six members of the vocal ensemble Collegium Vocale Köln (Wolfgang Fromme, Dagmar von Biel, Hans-Alderich Billig, Karl O. Barkey, and Helga Hamm), Rosalind Davies, Dr. Johannes Kneutgen (an ethologist working at the Max Planck Institute who studied, amongst other things, bird song, mammals, and fish, and later worked in music therapy,) violist Joachim Krist, recorder players and singers Michael Vetter and Atsuko Iwami, pianist Herbert Henck, and vocalist Jill Purce, with Péter Eötvös as "musical leader".

== Form and content ==
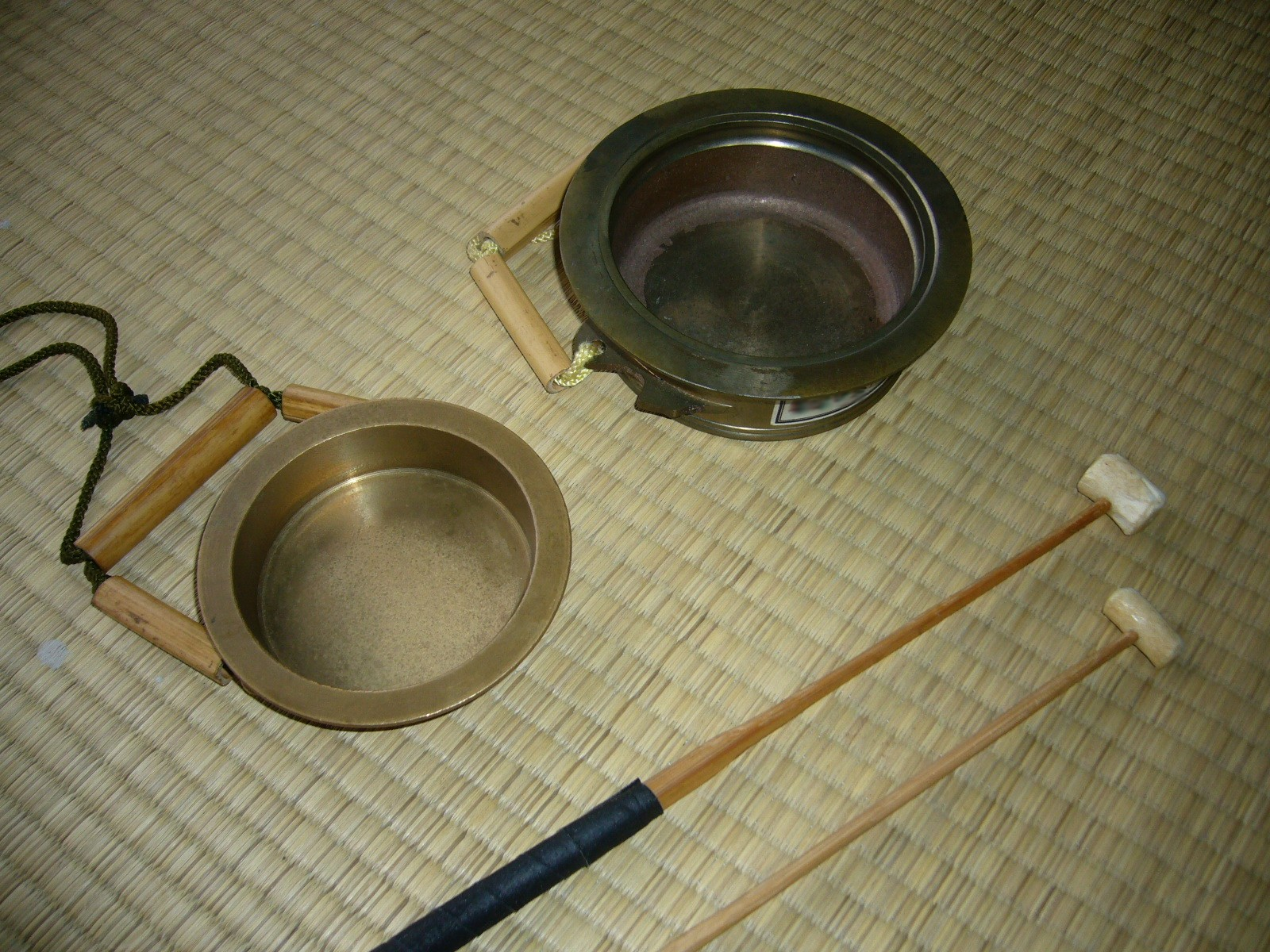
Japanese kane gongs, used as time-markers by the "musical leader"

Stockhausen himself recognized in Alphabet a precedent for the theatrical conceptions he would explore later in Licht The title originates from a programme of actions associated with the letters of the alphabet: Anrufen (call, appeal, implore), Begleiten (accompany), Chaos, Dudeln (tootle), Eintönig (monotone), etc. There are thirty "letters" in all: the familiar twenty-six of the English alphabet, plus SCHnell (rapid), SPringen (leap), STören (disturb), and Übergang zu (transition to). Each is written on a little card, and the performers of each group draw two of these cards from the deck. These become the basis for excursions by the performers of each "situation" to visit one of the other situations and exchange tonal information—each group therefore does this twice in the course of a performance.

Events are coordinated by acoustic signals given by a "musical leader": Japanese chimes (kane and rin) mark each minute; sustained tones mark the sequence of moments (the ends of which are "erased" by the sound of shaken bundles of Indian pellet bells); twice in every hour the coordinator runs through the space shaking strings of camel bells, which causes all activity to cease. These cessations occur five times over the four-hour span.

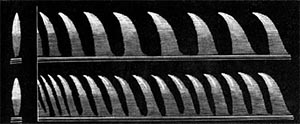
Rudolph Koenig's manometric flame apparatus (1862), a burning gas jet vibrating in response to pressure waves: situation 2 of Alphabet

Chladni diagrams for quadratic plates (from E. F. F. Chladni, Die Akustik, 1802), as used in situation 3 to "make sound spectra visible in solid material"

Alphabet consists of thirteen "situations":

1. No special function, a composition by Stockhausen, Am Himmel wandre ich, twelve songs on American Indian poems, for two amplified singers and sound projectionist
2. Tone vibrations made visible in liquids, light rays, and flames. Generate visible models in fluids by the influence of specific sound vibrations (play a polyphonic sound structure into two or three containers) and project them on a screen.
3. Make sound spectra visible in solid material (powder, iron filings, etc.) as a composed program with renewals and variation in duration of about half an hour:
4. With tones, cause glass to break.
5. Magnetize food with tones. Make the magnetization visible by means of a pendulum. Composition in the manner of the Indianerlieder, that is, a succession of melodies that produce a whole, if they are distributed over a period of four hours.
6. Massage a human body with sounds (vibrations of a musical instrument are translated by a dancer into her body. Her body is a living loudspeaker for the instrument).
7. Self-extinguishing tones (e.g., play a trumpet closely or at varying distances against a wall that is either bare or hung with a variety of surface materials, in order to achieve extinctions).
8. "Make love" with tones (e.g., with two recorders and/or voices generate beat frequencies and perhaps display the beat frequencies on oscilloscopes).
9. Using tones, harmonize the seven centres of the body (mantra technique).
10. Use tones to repel thoughts and keep thinking at bay
11. Use tones to speed up and slow down the respiration and heartbeat of living creatures (fish). Make the respiration rate of the fish visible on oscilloscopes, and at the same time make them audible. Project enlargements of the fish, from above and from the side, onto a screen (electronic camera, large-screen TV). In addition, hang up explanatory texts in large letters: Rhythm of gill movements, Rhythm of pulses (no conversing with the audience). An underwater loudspeaker in the aquarium; connect to it two pulse generators and two narrow-band tuned-resonance filter/amplifiers [abstimmbare Anzeigeverstärker] (a synthesizer with pre-programmed sound textures).
12. Invoke and supplicate the spirits of the dead in tones (until in a trance).
13. Pray using tones (sometimes intelligibly); study sung prayers of all religions (listen to tape recordings).

The verbal instructions for most of the scenes are either descriptions for physically inspired sound installations (e.g., situation 2: "Make sound vibrations visible") or appear to be intuitive music texts like those of Aus den sieben Tagen and Für kommende Zeiten, composed not long before Alphabet. Situation 10, in particular, strongly resembles Es from Aus den sieben Tagen: "Think NOTHING ... / as soon as you start to think, stop / and try to reattain / the state of NON-THINKING ...".

Two performers each are required for situations 1, 5, 6, and 8. This brings the total number of performers, including the musical leader, to eighteen.

== Potential hazards ==
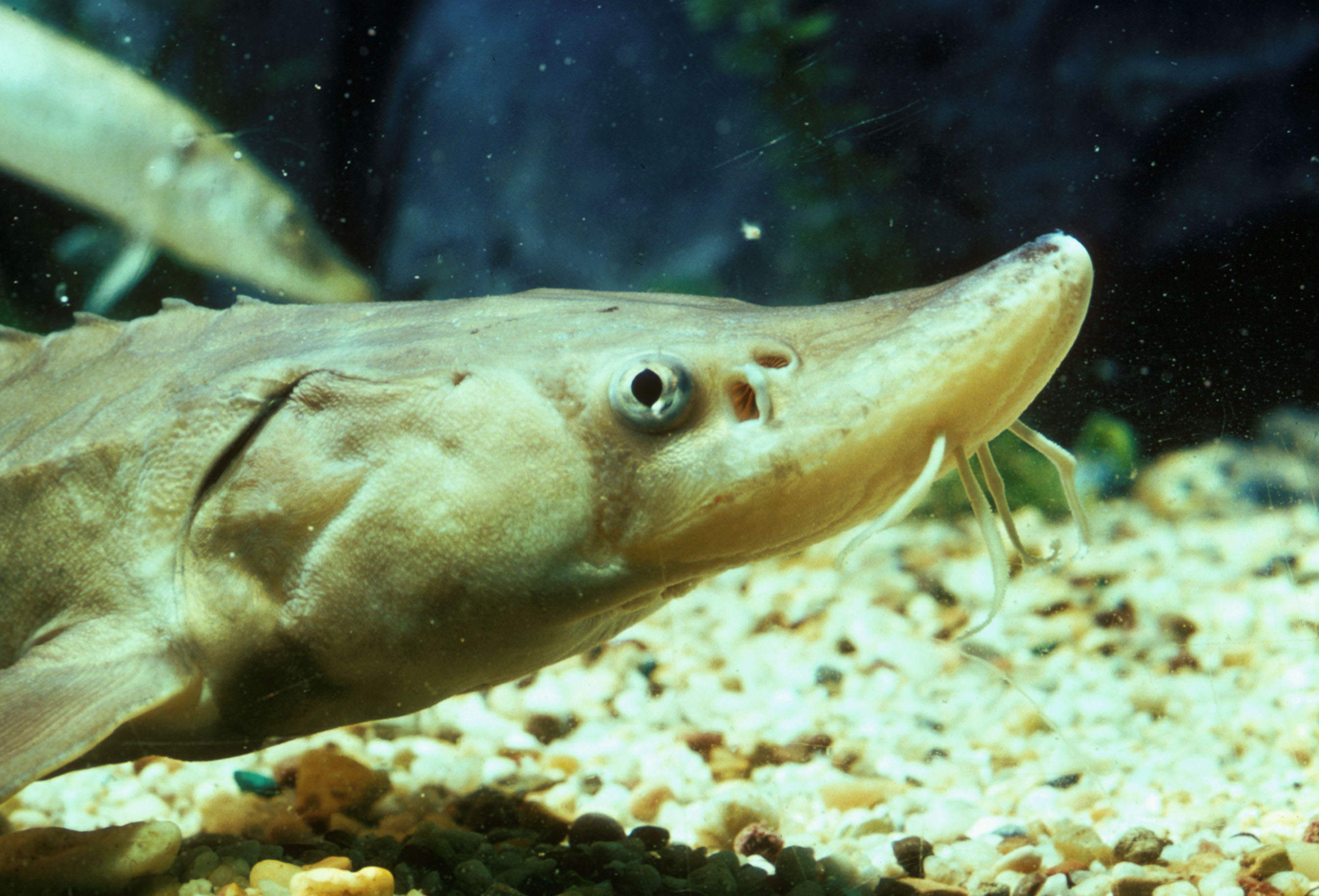
In situation 11, Dr. Johannes Kneutgen "synchronises sturgeon fish by sound waves, by certain tones in the breathing rhythm, so that the fish move in the rhythm of the music"

Johannes Kneutgen, who performed situation 11 at the Liège premiere, was a scientist at the Max Planck Institute for Behavioral Physiology in Seewiesen, conducting research on the physiological effects of music or rhythm on the body and nervous system. He reported that there was a physical danger in the case of fish:

For fish, the change of rhythm can be fatal. Normally fish breathe by opening and closing their gills. The lowest rate to which their gill movement can be reduced and still maintain life is 43 "breaths" per minute. If a clock ticks only 40 times per minute, the fish gill movement slows down too much, and the fish strives convulsively to breathe faster but cannot. It swims rapidly to escape the ticking noise, but if it cannot retreat to a quiet area, it expires.

Another writer has recalled an "infamous" French series of experiments with a "super-whistle" in the 1960s that demonstrated that very powerful low-frequency sounds (in the 5–8 Hz range) could interfere with the biorhythms of living creatures, to the extent of killing cattle, and warns that Alphabet's situation 9 ("harmonize the seven centres of the body") could prove similarly hazardous if done "scientifically ... with physical vibrations coordinated to biological and brain rhythms".

== Indianerlieder ==
The Indianerlieder (American Indian Songs)—also known by the opening words of the first song, "In the sky I am walking", and by their German translation "Am Himmel wandre ich"—constitute the only fully worked-out component of the Alphabet. It is also the only part capable of performance independent of the larger work, and the only part to have been published. The score is dedicated to its first performers, Helga Hamm-Albrecht and Karl O. Barkey, and bears the work Number 36½ in the composer's catalog of works.

The texts employed are:

1. twelve short poems, sayings, or prayers of various American Indian tribes, in English translations from an anthology called Indian Prose and Poetry
2. Onomatopoetic vocal sounds (bird songs, wind, war cries, etc.),
3. "unusual vocal sounds" and "favourite names", freely chosen by the performers
4. heckling
5. free intimate texts (something erotic, whispered to a beloved, which could never be spoken directly)
6. a freely chosen fairy tale dealing with tones
7. names such as Jillina, Jika, Jillaika (all pet names for Jill Purce), or Eagloo (a bird-man name, one of many used by the composer)
8. purely sonorous vowel and consonant constructions, interspersed with finger snaps, claps, foot taps, etc.

It consists of twelve scenes, each of which includes one American Indian song, for a pair of singer-actors. The scenes follow one another without interruption. The first song is intoned on a single note, C, the next song adds a second note to the first, the F♯ above, the third adds the G a semitone higher still, the fourth descends to E, and so on, until reaching a twelve-tone row in the final song, but with the notes in fixed registers: the basic formula of the work. The songs were originally conceived for two women's voices, but then the composer decided they could be performed (as they were at the premiere) by a man and a woman. They have also been performed by two male singers.

In a long version, such as is used in the four-hour-long Alphabet für Liège, the twelve scenes are sung straight through four times (with a pause of about fifteen minutes between each performance), with variations each time in dynamics and tempos. For an extremely long version (possibly alternating two different pairs of singers or exchanging singer combinations), the twelve scenes can be sung twelve times each, in the sequence: 1, 1+2, 1+2+3, ... 1+2+3+4+5+6+7+8+9+10+11+12, and then 2–12, 3–12, etc., down to 10+11+12, 11+12, and ending with 12. In such a performance, each song should be varied upon each repetition in dynamics and tempo.

== Performance history and reception ==
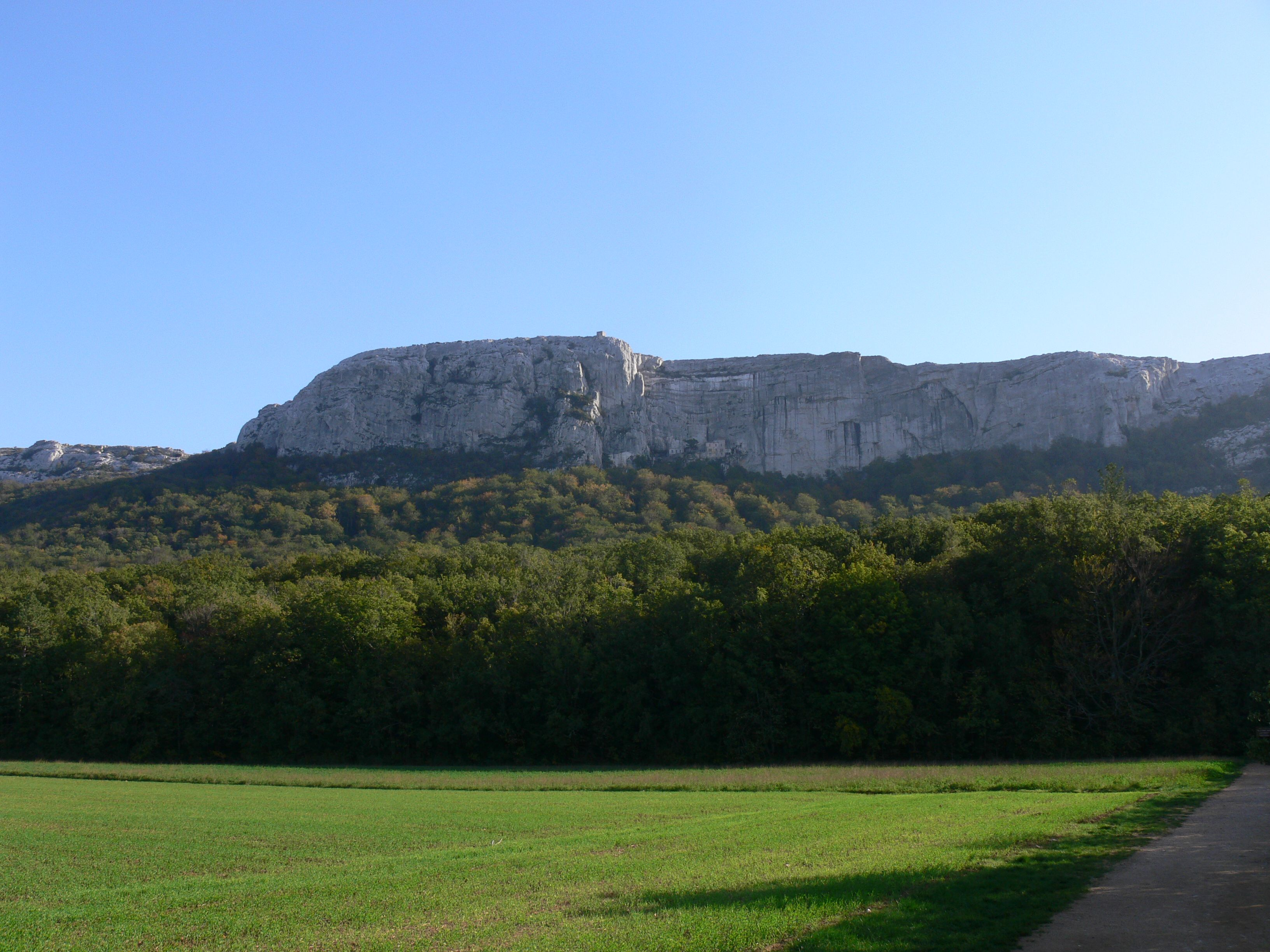
"The music flowed into the evening air in a light aura all splashed with echoes" at Sainte-Baume, site of the third performance of Alphabet für Liège in 1974

The full Alphabet has been performed only rarely. After the 1972 world premiere in Belgium, the first French performance took place in the context of a cycle of eleven Stockhausen works at the La Rochelle Festival during the two weeks before Easter 1973. In contrast to the basement Liège premiere, this performance was presented in a long attic gallery, with the "situations" presented in individual recesses. A third performance, also in France, took place in June 1974, at the second festival of the International Centre of Sainte-Baume in Provence, with the theme "Music and Magic". This performance was in a particularly beautiful natural setting:

At the foot of the great cliff of Sainte-Baume, high above a Provence cut up by highways, magic took precedence over futuristic technology. A calm, gentle, tender magic, in agreement with the Mediterranean night, all fragrant with the scent of the garrigue. A reassuring magic speaking primarily through music.

Very soon, indeed, from one to another of the twelve "cells" where the musician-celebrants were operating, sounds converged, answered one another, intersected, developed, weaving an unpredictable and subtle symphony of space. From the barn which opens onto the fields, fields that abut on the mountain, the music flowed into the evening air in a light aura all splashed with echoes. It was, revealed to the ear, like the very breathing of nature. And there were many of us there, lying prostrate for four hours on end, inside this music that had neither beginning nor end, nor any function other than to generate itself in the cyclical process of eternity.

The component Indianerlieder, on the other hand, had many successful performances in the years following the Liège premiere by the artists who had premiered the work, Helga Hamm-Albrecht and Karl O. Barkey. For example, they performed them in 1973 at the Metz Festival, in 1974 at both the Allgemeinen Deutschen Musikfest in Stuttgart and the Darmstädter Ferienkurse, and in 1978 in Luxembourg. They also recorded the work several times for various German radio stations. The Indianerlieder have also been recorded twice commercially, and have been viewed as the "key piece" within Alphabet. However, one critic who had previously heard the Indianerlieder in the context of Alphabet found, after hearing them separately at the Metz festival in November 1973, that the "somewhat artificial religiosity and falsely naïve Indian Songs suffer from being given in a theatre, without the 'mystical' atmosphere and ambulatory meditation of Alphabet".

== Filmography ==
- Alphabet pour Liège. Réalisation de Georges Yu. Colour, Commentary in French. Film of the world premiere, 23 September 1972. Liège: Radio-Télévision Belge de la Communauté Française, 1972. DVD release, Kürten: Stockhausen Verlag. [A one-hour documentary of filmed segments from the dress rehearsal for the premiere, with commentary in French by Jacques Dès.]

== Recordings (Indianerlieder) ==
- Stockhausen, Karlheinz. "Am Himmel wandre ich ..." (Indianerlieder) / "In the Sky I am Walking ..." (American Indian Songs) /"Dans le ciel jeme promène ..." (Chants indiennes) . Helga Hamm-Albrecht (mezzo-soprano), Karl O. Barkley (baritone), Karlheinz Stockhausen (sound direction). Recorded February 1977. LP recording. DG 2530 876. Hamburg: Deutsche Grammophon, 1977. Reissued on CD, Stockhausen Complete Edition CD 20. Kürten: Stockhausen-Verlag, 1992.
- Voxnova (musical group). In the Sky I Am Walking: Songs of the Native Americans. Isabelle Soccoja (mezzo-soprano), Nicholas Isherwood (bass-baritone) in the Stockhausen, with Valérie Chouanière (soprano) and Thierry Fouré (tenor). CD sound disc. Mode 68. New York: Mode Records, 1998. [With nine pieces of Native-American music, and Pascal Dusapin, Red Rock, the scene "Après" from Dusapin's opera Roméo et Juliette.]
