= Entangled Life =

2020 non-fiction book by Merlin Sheldrake

Entangled Life: How fungi make our worlds, change our minds and shape our futures
- Author: Merlin Sheldrake
- Language: English
- Genre: Non fiction
- Publisher: Random House
- Publication date: 12 May 2020
- Publication place: England
- Media type: Print
- Pages: 368
- Award: Wainwright Prize for writing on global conservation
- ISBN: 978-0-525-51031-4

Entangled Life: How Fungi Make Our Worlds, Change Our Minds and Shape Our Futures is a 2020 non-fiction book on mycology by the British biologist Merlin Sheldrake. His first book, it was published by Random House on 12 May 2020. Among the several accolades the book and author have received was the 2021 Royal Society Prize for Science Books.

== Author ==
Sheldrake is an expert in mycorrhizal fungi, holds a PhD in tropical ecology from the University of Cambridge for his work on underground fungal networks in tropical forests in Panama, where he was a predoctoral research fellow of the Smithsonian Tropical Research Institute, and he is on the advisory board of the Society for the Protection of Underground Networks (SPUN). His research is primarily in the fields of fungal biology and the history of Amazonian ethnobotany. He is the son of Rupert Sheldrake, a New Age author, and Jill Purce, an author and therapist, and the brother of musician Cosmo Sheldrake.

== Summary ==
The book looks at fungi from a number of angles, including decomposition, fermentation, nutrient distribution, psilocybin production, the evolutionary role fungi play in plants, and the ways in which humans relate to the fungal kingdom. It uses music and philosophy to illustrate its thesis, and introduces readers to a number of central strands of research on mycology. It is also a personal account of Sheldrake's experiences with fungi.

== Reception ==
Jennifer Szalai of The New York Times called the book an "ebullient and ambitious exploration" of fungi, adding, "reading it left me not just moved but altered, eager to disseminate its message of what fungi can do." Eugenia Bone of The Wall Street Journal called it "a gorgeous book of literary nature writing in the tradition of [Robert] Macfarlane and John Fowles, ripe with insight and erudition." Rachel Cooke of The Observer called it "an astonishing book that could alter our perceptions of fungi forever." Richard Kerridge, reviewing the book in The Guardian, wrote that "when we look closely [at fungi], we meet large, unsettling questions... [Sheldrake] carries us easily into these questions with ebullience and precision."

== Awards and honors ==
The book was named on Time magazine's list of the 100 Must-Read Books of 2020 and The Daily Telegraph's list of the 50 Best Books of 2020, and was chosen as one of the best nature books of 2020 by The Times. It was serialized on BBC Radio 4 as the book of the week, and is a Sunday Times best-seller. It won the Wainwright Prize in the Global Conservation Writing category, the Guild of Food Writers First Book Award, and the 2021 Royal Society Science Book Prize. It was shortlisted for the 2021 British Book Award for Non-Fiction: Narrative Book of the Year.

== Other media ==
Sheldrake presented the documentary Fungi: Web of Life, narrated by Björk.

=== Popular culture ===
- Entangled Life was an inspiration for the Spring 2021 couture collection by Iris van Herpen.
- A scene in “Midnight Train to Royston”, the eleventh episode of the second season of the sports comedy-drama series Ted Lasso, shows Coach Beard reading Entangled Life, highlighting his love of mushrooms.
