= Jill Purce =

British voice teacher, therapist, and author (born 1947)

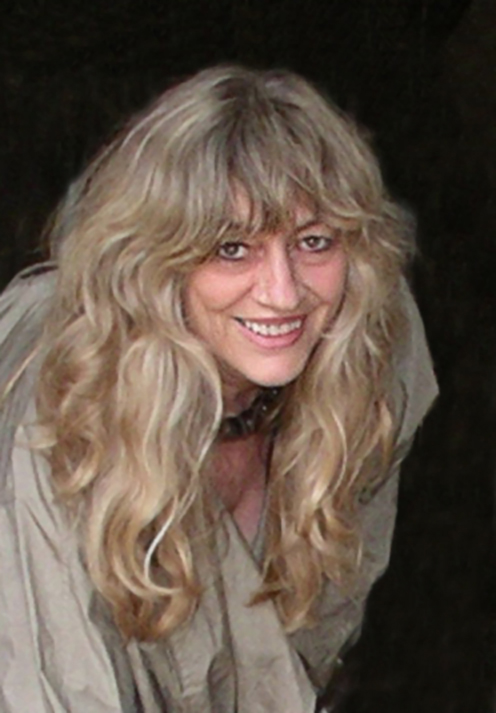
- Purce in 2005
- Born: 1947 (age 78–79); Staffordshire, England
- Occupations: Voice teacher; therapist; author
- Spouse: Rupert Sheldrake
- Children: Merlin Sheldrake, Cosmo Sheldrake
- Website: jillpurce.com

Jill Purce (born 1947) is a British voice teacher, Family Constellations therapist, and author. In the 1970s, Purce developed a new way of working with the voice, introducing the teaching of group overtone chanting, producing a single note whilst amplifying vocal harmonics. She is a former fellow of King's College London, Biophysics Department. She produced over 30 books as general editor of the Thames and Hudson Art and Imagination series. Between 1971 and 1974, she worked in Germany with the composer Karlheinz Stockhausen. Since the early 1970s, she has taught diverse forms of contemplative chant, especially overtone chanting. For over 15 years, she has been leading Family Constellations combined with chant.

Purce is the author of The Mystic Spiral: Journey of the Soul, a book about the spiral in sacred traditions, art, and psychology.

== Background ==
Purce was born in Staffordshire, England. Educated at Headington School, Oxford, she graduated with a BA in Fine Art from the University of Reading (1970) and Master's degrees from the Chelsea College of Art, London (1970–71), and King's College London.

In a BBC documentary about her, More Ways than One: The Mystic Spiral, Purce described how, through contemplating the patterns in water, she noticed that when flow encounters resistance, first it rotates, then these rotary patterns become individual eddies which separate out as independent forms. This observation of the form-creating principle of flow, resistance, and rotation, became the basis of her research from 1968 until 1974, on the form of the spiral and the theme of the labyrinth in nature, science, art, psychology, and sacred traditions.

Purce was awarded a Leverhulme Research Fellowship at King's College London, Biophysics Department, to explore the spiral as a universal structure. Here, she initiated a dialogue between science and spirituality with Maurice Wilkins (Nobel laureate with Watson and Crick for the discovery of DNA), and lectured to the British Society for Social Responsibility in Science. Between 1974 and 1976, she lectured at the Architectural Association School of Architecture and Chelsea College of Art and Design and was a visiting lecturer at numerous universities and art schools, on art and sacred traditions; form and the spiral; and the tradition of music, sound, and the voice as a contemplative practice in diverse cultures.

Her work with the voice was a major impetus behind widespread research into the supposed healing effects of sound from the 1970s onwards.

== Cymatics ==
Purce investigated the effect of sound on matter in the late 1960s, following the work of Hans Jenny, who used fine powders, liquids, and pastes, to show how formless matter takes on diverse forms and complex patterns through sound vibration. Purce also investigated the effect of sound vibrations on fine particles and on water, inspired by the early experiments of Ernst Chladni in 1785 and Margaret Watts Hughes between 1885 and 1904.

== Purce and Stockhausen ==
Between June 1971 and 1974, Purce lived in Kürten, Germany, and worked with the composer Karlheinz Stockhausen. Stockhausen had just introduced a simple form of overtone chanting using vowels to the West for the first time with the premiere of Stimmung in December 1968. During the autumn of 1971, Purce toured with Stockhausen and the performances of Stimmung throughout the eastern United States and Canada. She provided him with many ideas about sounds and their effects on matter, which he used to create Alphabet für Liège, a piece demonstrating those effects (1972). Purce took part in performances of Stockhausen's music at various music festivals (Liège, Rencontres Internationales d'Art Contemporain—La Rochelle, and Sainte-Baume—1972, 1973, 1974).

== Working with the voice ==
Researching the supposed beneficial properties of the voice since 1968 and having spent time with the Gyutö monks before going to Germany in 1971, Purce later continued her studies in the Himalayas with the chantmaster of the Gyutö Tibetan Monastery, Tenpa Gyaltsen, and with the Mongolian Khöömii master, Yavgaan, in order to explore the Tibetan and Mongolian methods of overtone chanting.

Purce's research, lectures, and workshops, have attempted to demonstrate how the human voice might be used to bring about positive psychological, emotional, and physical changes through acting as a link between body and mind, as described in Buddhist and other Eastern traditions.

Purce has also been invited by several hospitals and schools to explore how these voice techniques might be of positive help to women in childbirth; at the Maudsley Hospital in London, with people suffering from Alzheimer's; at the Royal Free Hospital, London, with people suffering from mental disabilities; at Hawthorn School, with children suffering from physical disabilities; and with people suffering from Chronic fatigue syndrome.

In June 1993, Purce gave a lecture and seminar for the English National Opera titled The Healing Power of Opera, as part of the Covent Garden Music Festival, London. She later led the audience in a chanting meditation before the first performance of Jonathan Harvey's opera Inquest of Love for ENO.

In 2003, she was invited to work with nuns and monks in a number of enclosed Christian monastic communities who sing Gregorian chant, particularly Burnham Abbey and Fairacres, Oxford, to teach overtone chanting and other methods to explore ways of reinvigorating and rediscovering the contemplative aspects of chant in Christian traditions.

== Family Constellations ==
In 1999, as part of the international conference on Family Constellations, and the work of family therapist Bert Hellinger in Wiesloch, Germany, Purce was invited to give an extended workshop to demonstrate her work to Hellinger's students and conference delegates. Influenced by her time in Japan in the early 1980s, where there is a strong tradition of honouring ancestors, Purce developed a process for doing this in her own work, using ceremony and chant to acknowledge excluded family members, both living and dead.

== Personal life ==
Jill Purce is married to author and former biochemist Rupert Sheldrake. They have two sons, biologist Merlin Sheldrake and musician Cosmo Sheldrake.

== Selected works ==
Book

- Jill Purce, (1974), The Mystic Spiral: Journey of the Soul, Thames & Hudson.

CDs

- Overtone Chanting Meditations
- The Healing Voice

Film

- Just One More Breath—film made for the art festival Forum en Scene in Middleburg, Holland on YouTube.
