= Merlin Sheldrake =

British biologist and author (born 1987)

- Born: 1987 (age 38–39); London, England
- Education: University of Cambridge (PhD)
- Occupations: Mycologist, writer
- Organization: Society for the Protection of Underground Networks
- Known for: Advocacy for fungi
- Notable work: Entangled Life
- Spouse: Erin Robinsong
- Parent(s): Rupert Sheldrake and Jill Purce
- Relatives: Cosmo Sheldrake (brother)
- Awards: Royal Society Science Book Prize (2021)
- Website: merlinsheldrake.com

Merlin Sheldrake (born 1987) is a British mycologist and writer known for his popular science writings on fungi.

== Early life and education ==
Merlin Sheldrake was born in 1987 in London to Rupert Sheldrake, an English author and parapsychology researcher, and Jill Purce, a therapist. He grew up near Hampstead Heath in London. His brother, Cosmo Sheldrake, is a musician. As a teenager, Sheldrake was influenced by Paul Stamets, a self-taught mycologist and "fungal evangelist," and Karl von Frisch's book Animal Architecture.

Sheldrake studied at the University of Cambridge, where he was a scholar of Clare College. After being awarded his undergraduate degree in biological science, he subsequently earned a master's degree in the history and philosophy of science, and later a PhD in tropical ecology. He studied underground fungal networks in Panama's tropical forests as a predoctoral research fellow at the Smithsonian Tropical Research Institute.

== Career ==
In 2020, Sheldrake published his first book, Entangled Life, which appeared on The Sunday Times and The New York Times bestseller lists and received the 2021 Royal Society Science Book Prize. Inspired by Sheldrake's book, couture designer Iris van Herpen created a collection based on fungi, featuring designs mimicking chanterelle mushrooms and hyphae. He later presented the IMAX documentary Fungi: Web of Life, which was narrated by Björk and filmed in Tasmania's Tarkine rainforest.

During the COVID-19 pandemic, Sheldrake and his brother co-founded Sheldrake & Sheldrake, a company that produces fermented hot sauce.

In 2021, Sheldrake consulted on Stella McCartney's fungal-themed Paris runway show. The show featured a soundtrack by his brother, Cosmo Sheldrake, who used a device to convert mycelium's electrical signals into musical notes.

Sheldrake serves on the advisory board of the Society for the Protection of Underground Networks, an organization focused on mapping and protecting mycorrhizal diversity. He has also worked with mycologist Giuliana Furci and NYU law professor César Rodríguez Garavito on efforts to develop legal protections for fungi and other non-human organisms. Since 2023, Sheldrake has been a research associate at Vrije Universiteit Amsterdam in the Netherlands. He is part of a group called "Bopeas", or "Bohemian Peasants", a term used for a cultural trend combining creative expression with a rural or neo-medieval aesthetic.

In 2025, it was revealed that Sheldrake had briefly communicated with Jeffrey Epstein in 2018 after being offered scientific funding. Sheldrake did not accept the funding, and broke off all contact after learning about Epstein's criminal activity.

== Personal life ==
Sheldrake is married to the poet Erin Robinsong.

== Bibliography ==
- Sheldrake, Merlin (2020). Entangled Life
- Sheldrake, Merlin (2023). Entangled Life: The Illustrated Edition
