= Sternklang =

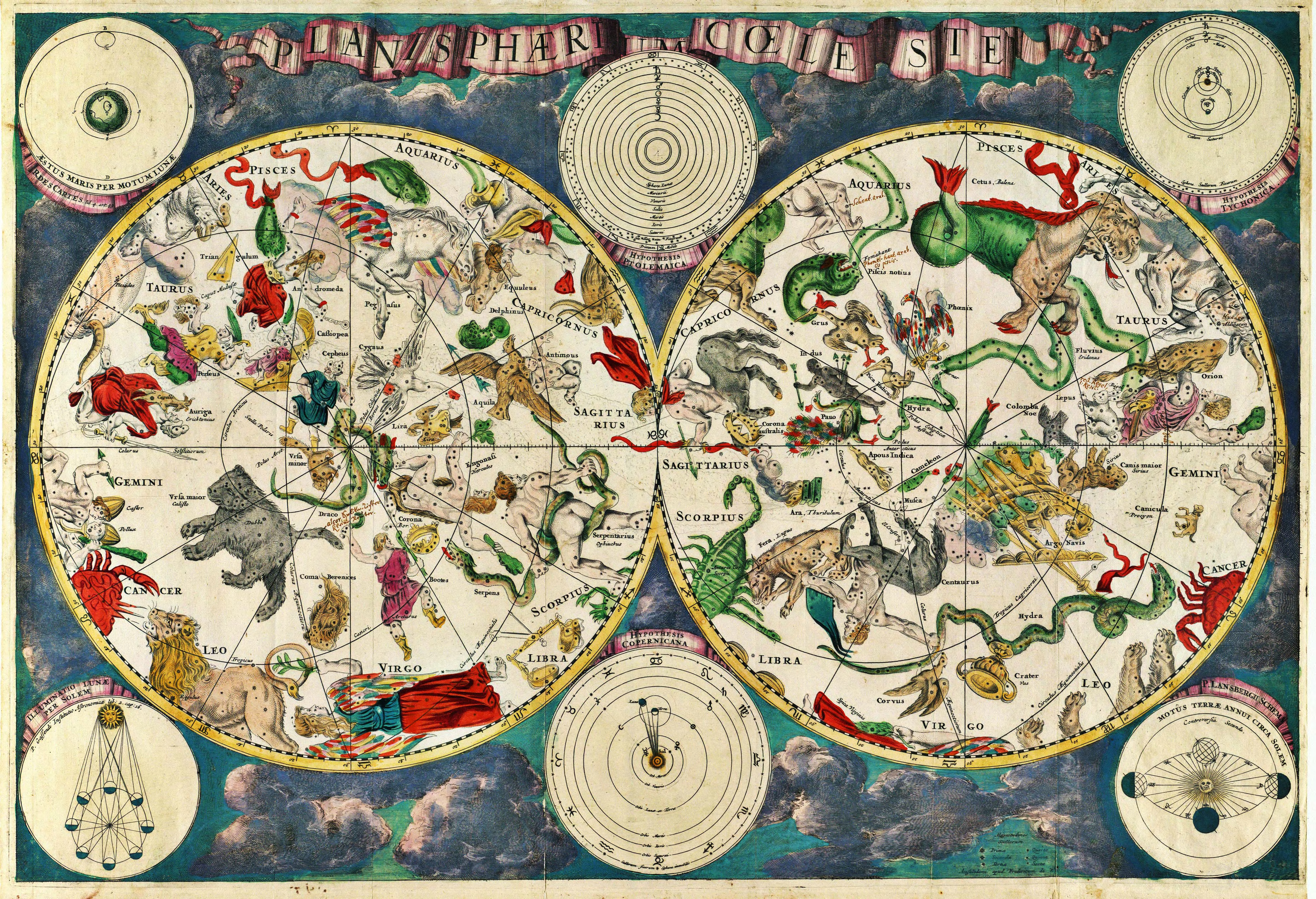
Frederik de Wit: Planisphærium Coeleste (1670)

Sternklang (Star Sound), is a 1971 musical piece by German composer Karlheinz Stockhausen, described as "park music for five groups". It bears the work number 34 in his catalogue of compositions, and combines acoustic instruments with synthesizers and electrical amplification. The score is dedicated to his spouse, Mary Bauermeister, and a performance of the work lasts from two-and-a-half to three hours.

== History and concept ==
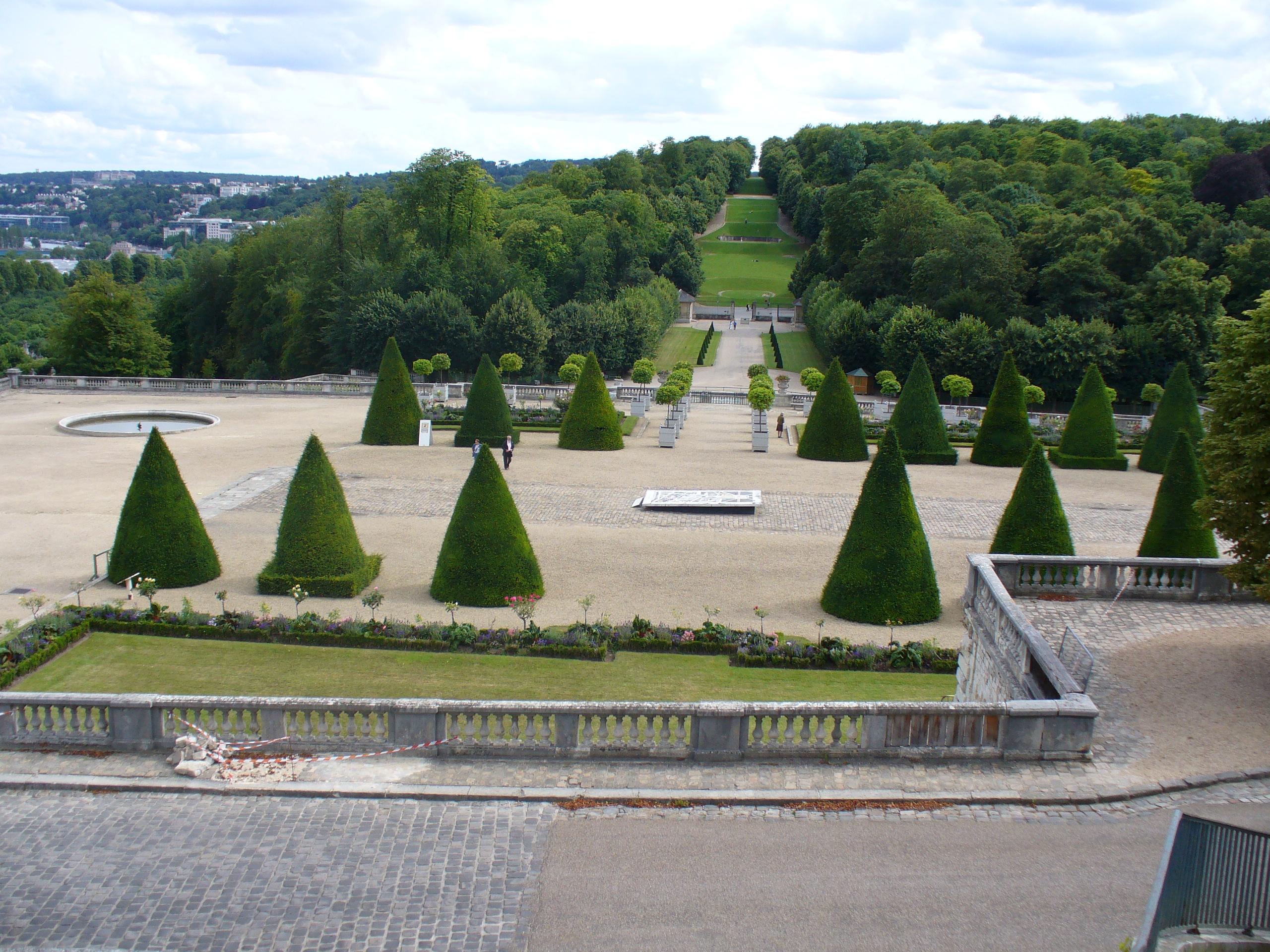
Sternklang was performed in Parc de St. Cloud, Paris, in 1975

Sternklang is "park music", to be performed outdoors at night by 21 singers and/or instrumentalists divided into five groups, at widely separated locations. The sounds from each performer are separately amplified and projected over loudspeakers. "Sound runners" transport musical "models" from one group to another, while a percussionist stationed at a central position helps synchronise the groups to common tempos at ten points in the piece. The piece has been described as "a twilight fantasy … an extended outdoor Stimmung". From a technical point of view, it tackles and solves the problem of coordinating independent harmonic groups.

Although Sternklang was first conceived in 1969, it was only composed two years later, on a commission from Sender Freies Berlin. The first performance took place from 8:30 to 11:30pm on 5 June 1971 in the Englischer Garten of the Tiergarten, Berlin, near the Akademie der Künste. The performers were the Collegium Vocale Köln, an expanded version of Stockhausen's touring ensemble, Hugh Davies and his group, The Gentle Fire from London, and Roger Smalley and Tim Souster's ensemble, Intermodulation, from Cambridge. About four thousand people attended the performance. Despite the unusually difficult performance requirements, there have been a number of subsequent performances:

- 29 and 31 August 1972, at the Englischer Garten in Munich during the 1972 Summer Olympics
- 8 September 1972, in the Parc Delgosha as part of the Shiraz Arts Festival in Iran
- 2 July 1974, in the Parc Franck-Delmas at the La Rochelle Festival
- 20 and 22 June 1975, in the Parc de Saint-Cloud in Paris-St. Cloud
- 26 and 27 July 1980, in the Beethovenhalle, Bonn
- 18 and 19 June 1984, as part of the Olympic Arts Festival of Contemporary Music, Los Angeles
- 23 November 1988, as part of the Huddersfield Contemporary Music Festival. Performers from five British universities prepared by Peter Britton and supervised by the composer
- 14 July 1992, in Cannon Hill Park, Birmingham (UK), performers from the Birmingham Conservatoire, the Midlands Arts Centre, Anglia Polytechnic, Joseph Chamberlain Sixth Form College, and Birmingham University, with the university's electro-acoustic sound system, BEAST, under the composer's direction
- 7 September 2010, in the Killesbergpark, Stuttgart, by the ensembles of the Netzwerk Süd: ascolta, gelberklang, Neue Vocalsolisten Stuttgart, and Suono Mobile, under the auspices of Sounding D—Neue Musik in Deutschland
- 16 September 2016, in Ekebergparken, Oslo. Part of the Ultima Festival, performers from Nordic Voices and the Norwegian Academy of Music.
- 27 August 2022, in Schlosspark Brühl, Brühl (Germany). Part of the Acht Brücken Festival, performers from Nordic Voices, the Birmingham Contemporary Music Group and Das Neue Ensemble, with musical direction by Stephan Meier.

The two Bonn performances in 1980 had been planned for outdoor performance in the Rheinauenpark. The loudspeaker towers were scheduled to be set up in the park on 21 July, five days before the first performance, but by that time uninterrupted rain had been falling for a week with no improvement in sight, so the decision was made to relocate the performance indoors, into the large auditorium of the Beethovenhalle. Stockhausen found that there were certain advantages to an indoor venue (better auditory contact among the performers, improved control of the just tuning of the harmonies, etc.), and so decided henceforth to authorise such performances and drew up special instructions for those conditions. In connection with this extension of performance practice Stockhausen decided also that even a single group out of the five specified in the score, or any combination of two to five groups may perform freely selected excerpts from Sternklang in concert.

== Analysis ==
Constellations of Boötes and Coma Berenices, both used for proportions in Sternklang

Sternklang creates a sense of "non-progressive or circular time by blurring complex relationships between pitch and rhythm based on the overtone series so that the structure is perceived as inexhaustible and thus appears static". The entire composition is based on five just-intoned harmonic sounds, each containing eight tones corresponding to the second through ninth partials of the overtone series. One of these tones in each chord is the E above middle C, tuned to 330 Hz. In the first chord this functions as the ninth partial, in the second chord as the eighth partial, and so on to the fifth chord, where it is the fifth partial. Compositionally, the harmonic structure fluctuates between an extreme situation in which all five groups share the same chord and the opposite extreme where each group's chord is different.

The rhythms, tone colours, and pitch intervals in the "models" are directly derived from star constellations observed in the sky and integrated as musical figures.

The self-similarity of the time and pitch structures recalls the same composer's Gruppen.

== Reception ==
At the Birmingham performance in 1992, the composer observed members of the audience:

They stayed a while at the same place to listen to a group, then moved away in the park in the direction of another group. As I walked from group to group … I began to encounter the same people. Those located in the central listening area did not remain there long, at most five minutes, then went toward a group—who knows what prompted them to choose this one over another?

The overall response of the audience attending was described by another observer:

for many in the park on Tuesday night the experience was unique and estimable: not a soul I talked to disliked it. Quite what came down to Earth that night as a result of this community endeavour has to be a matter of personal experience. At the very least those who brought this astonishing event to fulfilment can rest secure in the knowledge that they have given Birmingham a night unlike any other.

== Discography ==
- Karlheinz Stockhausen: Sternklang. Group 1 (Intermodulation): Peter Britton (synthesizer), Tim Souster (electric viola with synthesizer), Robin Thompson (bassoon with synthesizer), Roger Smalley (synthesizer); Group 2: Annette Meriweather (soprano); Wolfgang König (trombone with synthesizer), Hans-Alderich Billig (bass), Harald Bojé (electronium); Group 3: Helga Hamm-Albrecht (mezzo-soprano), Wolfgang Fromme (tenor), Helmut Clemens (tenor), Peter Sommer (trombone with synthesizer); Group 4 (Gentle Fire): Stuart Jones (violin with synthesizer), Hugh Davies (clarinet with synthesizer), Graham Hearn (synthesizer), Michael Robinson (cello with synthesizer); Group 5: Markus Stockhausen (trumpet with synthesizer), Suzanne Stephens (clarinet with synthesizer), Atsuko Iwami (alto voice and recorder), Michael Vetter (bass and recorder); Richard Bernas (percussion, from Gentle Fire). 2-LP recording. Recorded in the Studio des Dames, Paris, June 24–26, 1975. Polydor 2612 031 (2335 116 and 2335 117). [Germany]: Polydor International; Deutsche Grammophon 2707 123 (2531 281 & 2531 282). [Hamburg]: Deutsche Grammophon, 1976. Reissued on 2-CD set, Stockhausen Complete Edition CD 18A–B. Kürten: Stockhausen-Verlag, 1992.

== Filmography ==
- 1980. Omnibus: Tuning in with Stockhausen and the Sing Circle. BBC TV. [Includes excerpts from Sternklang.]
