= Toby Kiers =

Evolutionary biologist

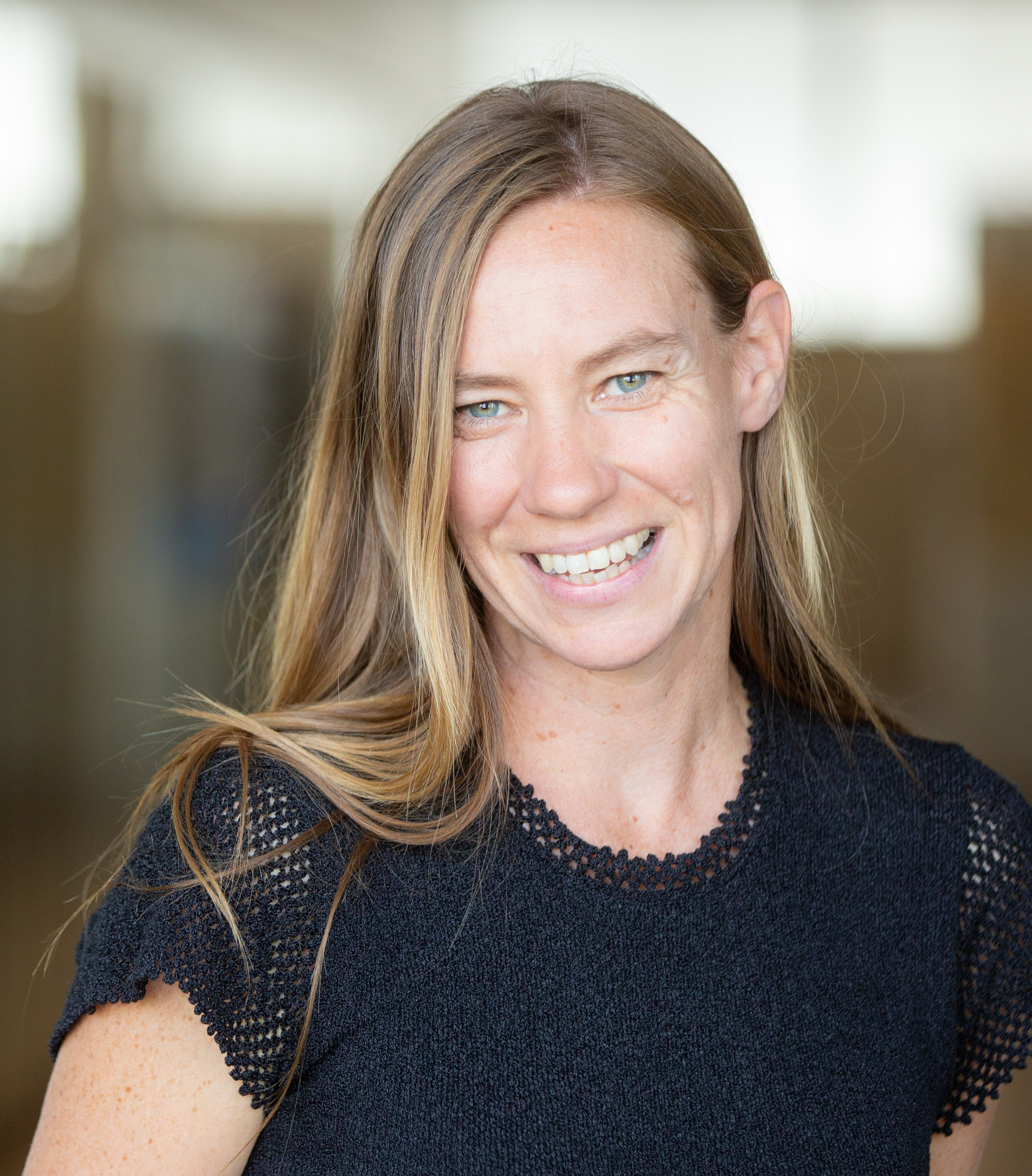
- Toby Kiers in 2019
- Born: Erica Tobyn Kiers; 1976 (age 49–50)
- Education: The Mountain School
- Alma mater: Bowdoin College (BA); University of California, Davis (PhD)
- Awards: MacArthur Fellows Program (2025); Spinoza Prize (2023); Tyler Prize for Environmental Achievement (2026)
- Scientific career
- Institutions: Vrije Universiteit Amsterdam
- Thesis: Evolution of cooperation in the legume-rhizobium symbiosis (2005)
- Doctoral advisor: Robert Ford Denison
- Website: research.vu.nl/en/persons/3909742e-8c3e-488c-840c-18652be4ce0b

Erica Tobyn Kiers is an American evolutionary biologist who is a University Research Chair and professor at Vrije Universiteit Amsterdam. Kiers pioneered an economic interpretation of the interactions and exchanges between plants, fungi and microbes in mycorrhizal networks. She co-founded the Society for the Protection of Underground Networks (SPUN). Kiers is a 2023 Spinoza laureate, 2025 Climate Breakthrough Award awardee and the recipient of a MacArthur Foundation Fellowship. She also received the 2026 Tyler Prize for Environmental Achievement.

== Early life and education ==
Kiers attended The Mountain School in Vermont for her fall 1992 high school semester.

Kiers received her Bachelor of Arts (BA) degree in 1999 from Bowdoin College. In 1997, she spent time as a student at the Smithsonian Tropical Research Institute and gave a talk.

She did her Ph.D. at University of California, Davis, completing a thesis entitled Evolution of cooperation in the legume-rhizobium symbiosis in 2005 supervised by Robert Ford Denison.

== Career and research ==
Kiers is best known for her work on mycorrhizal networks, studying the rates of exchange of nutrients. Her observations are that fungi in the soil behave as economic agents in a free-market system, supplying more phosphorus to plants that are able to deliver more sugar in exchange. Based on this hypothesis, Kiers is interested in developing fungi that behave "altruistically" in their environment to foster efficient plant growth and reduce the need for fertilizers. This interpretation of soil interactions as competition complicated the picture of a collaborative equilibrium that had begun to develop prior. It also allows Kiers to borrow mathematical models from economic theory to characterize nutrient exchanges. To track the flow of nutrients, Kiers has pioneered the use of quantum dots to tag molecules so that they fluoresce and can be more easily differentiated. Her work also concerns the evolution of plant-fungal interactions as the organisms evolve and enter into contact with new partners. Her research is supported by the European Research Council, the Netherlands Organisation for Scientific Research (NWO) and the National Science Foundation.

Kiers's economic interpretation of nutrient exchange is not universally accepted. Others have noted that this perspective anthropomorphizes fungi in a way that may not accurately capture the true dynamics of the system. By assuming that each organism acts to further its own personal gain, the theory neglects the possibility that plants and fungi may exist in a fully collaborative relationship with well-aligned interests.

She helped to create an art installation with Isaac Monté and worked with designer Niels Hoebers to create an animated short film as a visual aid for her research presentations. Her research and comments on mycorrhizal networks were featured in the 2020 book Entangled Life. Kiers has launched a non-profit organization called Society for the Protection of Underground Networks (SPUN) dedicated to informing the public about mycorrhizal networks, protecting biodiversity hotspots, and promoting further research. Kiers founded SPUN to map the biodiversity of the Earth's mycorrhizal communities... [and] is mapping what has been called the "dark matter" of life on the planet. In 2023, Kiers was the subject of the short documentary The Underground Astronaut, directed by Marleine van der Werf as part of the Ammodo Docs series. The film follows Kiers' research into mycorrhizal networks and her efforts to map underground fungal ecosystems.

=== Awards and honors ===
- 2015 Bio Art & Design (BAD) Award in collaboration with artist Isaac Monté.
- 2019 Laureate, Ammodo Science Award in Natural Sciences.
- 2023 Impact Award, Amsterdam science and innovation awards
- 2023 Spinoza Prize, by the Dutch Research Council (NWO)
- 2025 Kiers was awarded a MacArthur Foundation Fellowship, popularly known as the MacArthur Foundation's "Genius Award"

== Personal life ==
She is married to the poet Cralan Kelder and has two children.

Kiers has been a strong advocate against bioengineered food, demanding that labels clearly indicate the presence of genetically engineered ingredients.
