= Amanita galactica =

Scientific classification
- Kingdom: Fungi
- Division: Basidiomycota
- Class: Agaricomycetes
- Order: Agaricales
- Family: Amanitaceae
- Genus: Amanita
- Species: A. galactica

Binomial name
- Amanita galactica Furci & Dentinger

Species of fungus

Amanita galactica is a species of agaric fungus in the family Amanitaceae, first described by Giuliana Furci and Bryn Dentinger in 2020. The species was discovered in the Andes of southern Chile, living at the base of trees such as Nothofagus and Araucaria araucana. The epithet galactica was given by Furci, and was inspired by the bright white spots on the black cap that reminded her of a galaxy dotted with stars.
