= Collegium Vocale Köln =

German vocal ensemble

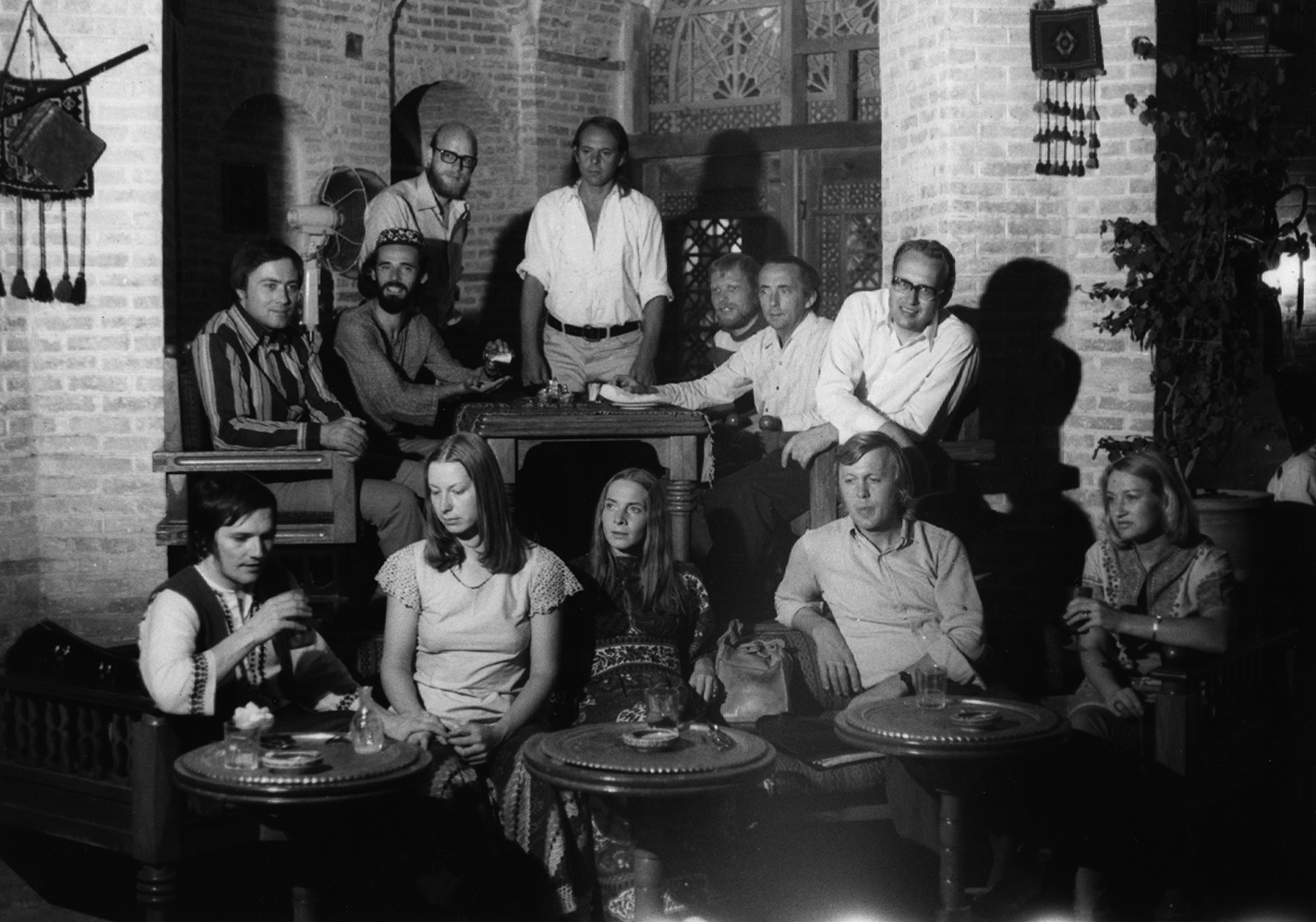
Collegium Vocale Köln (inter al.), Shiraz Arts Festival September 1972: back (standing), Volker Müller, Karlheinz Stockhausen, (seated) Karl O. Barkey, Hans-Aldrich Billig, Wolfgang Lüttgen, Günther Engels, Christoph Caskel, front, Péter Eötvös, Dagmar von Biel, Gaby Rodens, Wolfgang Fromme, Helga Hamm-Albrecht

Collegium Vocale Köln is a German vocal ensemble, founded in 1966 as a quintet when its members were still students at the Rheinische Musikschule in Cologne. It is directed by Wolfgang Fromme, who also sings tenor in the ensemble. They are best known as the group for which Karlheinz Stockhausen composed Stimmung in 1968, a work which they had performed more than three hundred of times throughout the world by 1986. The original impetus for the ensemble's founding, however, was an appearance by Alfred Deller at the Cologne Courses for Early Music, and the group has always performed both early and contemporary works.

German Pavilion, Expo '70, where the Collegium performed Stockhausen's works in the spherical auditorium, out of view at the right

In addition to Stimmung, the Collegium Vocale performed other works by Stockhausen, notably as part of the ensemble of musicians who appeared with him at Expo '70 in Osaka, Japan, between March and September 1970, where individual singers of the group performed Spiral for a soloist with a short-wave radio. On 5 June 1971 the Collegium Vocale participated in the world premiere of Stockhausen's Sternklang in the Tiergarten in Berlin, and appeared also in subsequent performances in the Englischer Garten in Munich, at the Shiraz Arts Festival in 1972, in the Parc Franck Delmas at the La Rochelle Festival in 1974, and in the Parc de Saint-Cloud in 1975. Four members of the group also took part in a studio recording of the work made in June 1975. In the meantime, they had also participated in the world premiere of his Alphabet für Liège on 23 September 1972.

== Discography ==
- Banchieri, Adriano. Barca di Venetia per Padova: dilettevoli Madrigali à 5 voci (Madrigalkomödie). Collegium Vocale Köln; Gianrico Tedeschi, narrator; Colin Tilney, harpsichord; Pere Ros, viola da gamba and violone. Reflexe. LP recording. EMI Electrola 1C 063-30 128 Q. Cologne: EMI Electrola, 1976.
- Gesualdo, Carlo. Madrigals (Book VI). Collegium Vocale Köln, dir. Wolfgang Fromme (Recorded 7–11 December 1981, Deutsche Evangelische Christuskirche, Paris). LP recording. CBS Masterworks IM 37758. New York: CBS, 1983.
- Moro Lasso. Works by Carlo Gesualdo, Péter Eötvös, Claudio Monteverdi, Guillaume Dufay, Demetres Terzakes, Giovanni Pierluigi da Palestrina, and Ernst Widmer. Collegium Vocale Köln, dir. Wolfgang Fromme. LP recording. EMI Electrola 1 C 065-28 830. Cologne: EMI Electrola.
- The Most Beautiful Madrigals / Les Plus beaux madrigaux / Die schönsten Madrigal. Collegium Vocale Köln, dir. Wolfgang Fromme. 3-LP set. CBS Masterworks 79 333. [New York]: CBS Masterworks, 1980. Reissued as Madrigals. 2-CD recording. CBS Odyssey MB2K 45622. [New York]: CBS Odyssey, 1989.
- Stockhausen, Karlheinz: Stimmung (Paris Version). Collegium Vocale Köln (Dagmar Apel, Gaby Rodens, Helga Albrecht, Wolfgang Fromme, Georg Steinhoff, Hans-Alderich Billig) (recorded WDR, Cologne, 30 & 31 October 1969). Avant Garde. Deutsche Grammophon 2543 003 (LP), and in Avant Garde Vol. 3 DG 2720 025 (6LP boxed set). Hamburg: Deutsche Grammophon, 1971.
- Stockhausen, Karlheinz: Stimmung (Paris Version). Collegium Vocale Köln (Dagmar von Biel, Gaby Ortmann-Rodens, Helga Hamm-Albrecht, Wolfgang Fromme, Helmut Clemens, Hans-Alderich Billig) (recorded 1982). In Deutscher Musikrat: Zeitgenössische Musik in der Bundesrepublik Deutschland 7. Harmonia Mundi DMR 1019-21 (3LP boxed set).
  The above two recordings together have been rereleased on CD in the Stockhausen Complete Edition CD 12 A-B (2 CDs).
- Zeitreisen. Works by Péter Eötvös (Hochzeitsmadrigal), Georg Kröll (Parodia ad Perotinum), Matthias Pintscher (Départ and Monumento 3), Krzysztof Meyer (Hommage à Johannes Brahms op. 59), Michael Denhoff (Nachtbild), and Johannes Kalitzke (Jardins paradoxaux). Collegium Vocale Köln; Rundfunk-Sinfonieorchester Saarbrücken, cond. Hans Zender; Ensemble Varianti, cond. Mathias Pintscher; Kölner Rundfunk-Sinfonie-Orchester, cond. Antoni Wit. Andere Welten 5. CD recording. Schwann Musica Mundi 3 50 372. Munich: Koch International, 1996.
