= Society for the Protection of Underground Networks =

Mycorrhizal fungi research organization

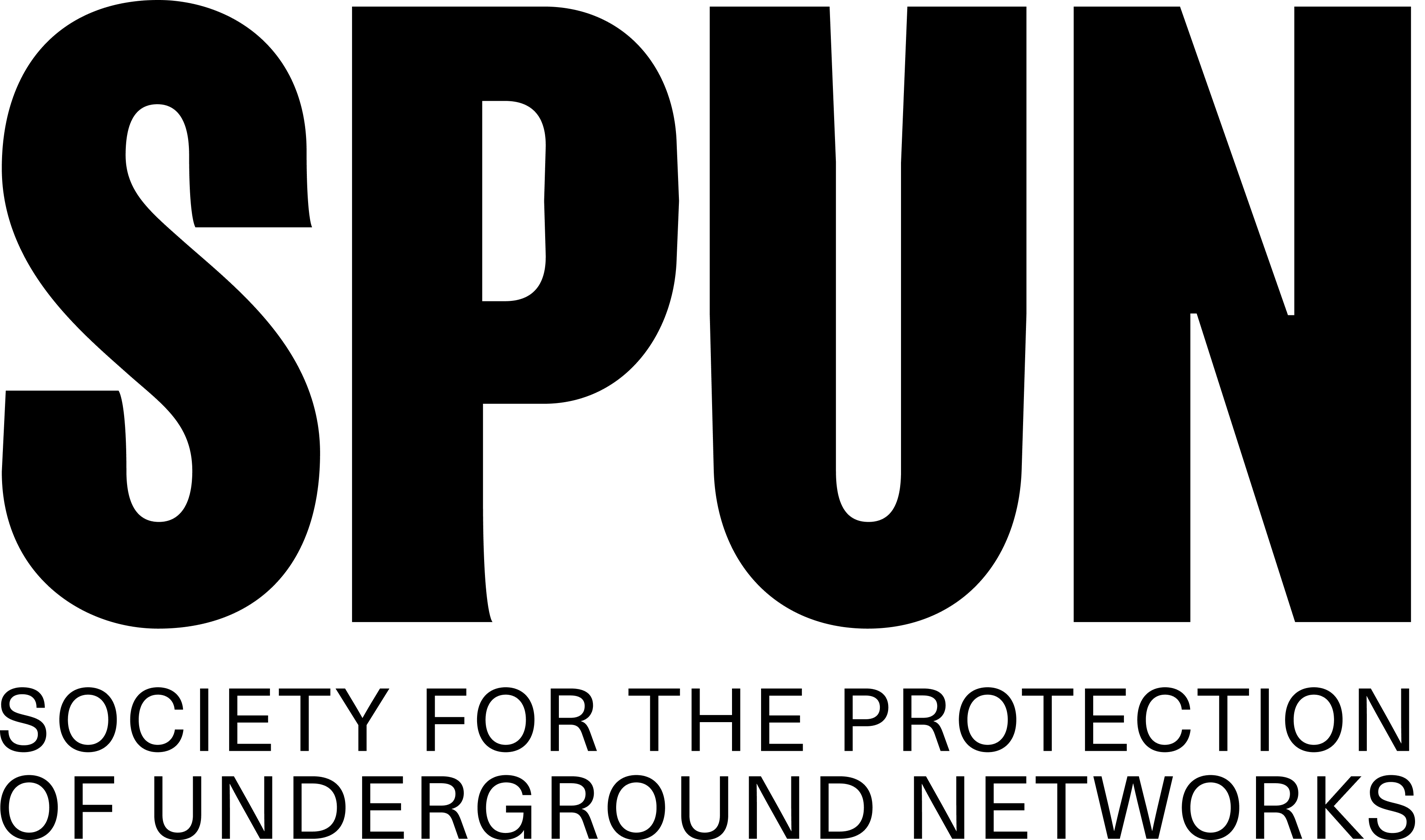
- Abbreviation: SPUN
- Established: 2021
- Director: Prof. Dr. Toby Kiers
- Board of directors: Mark Tercek, Jeremy Grantham, Rose Marcario
- Affiliations: Vrije Universiteit Amsterdam, AMOLF, Fungi Foundation, GlobalFungi
- Website: spun.earth

The Society for the Protection of Underground Networks (SPUN) is a science-based initiative to map and protect the mycorrhizal networks that regulate the Earth's climate and ecosystems.

The organization was founded in 2021. The Executive Director is Toby Kiers, an evolutionary biologist at the Vrije Universiteit Amsterdam. The stated goals of The Society for the Protection of Underground Networks (SPUN) are mapping, protecting, and harnessing mycorrhizal fungi.

SPUN is activating mycologists around the world, working with local collaborators to obtain core soil samples from all types of ecosystems. The goal is to survey, locate, and identify the diverse domains of mycelia and create a fungal atlas, a biological reference guide to ensure their protection.

== Research ==
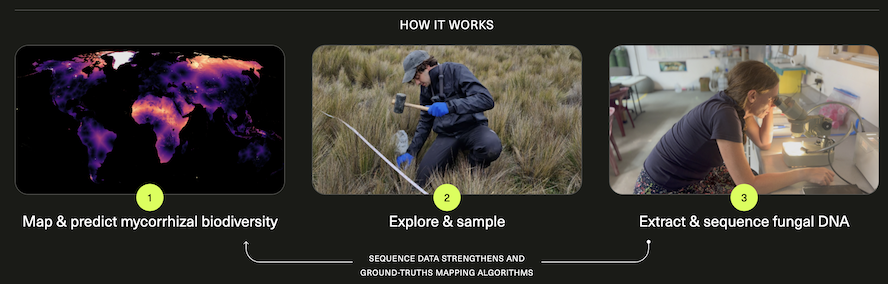
Map, sample, DNA extraction and analysis. SPUN workflow. In the left panel, prioritization mapping based on underexplored ecosystems; in the second panel, soil sampling showing Dr. Justin Stewart in Ecuador; in the third panel, analysis showing Dr. Toby Kiers in Palmyra Atoll.

The Society for the Protection of Underground Networks samples soil and extracts and sequences fungal DNA in order to learn which fungi are present. The geo-located fungal taxa are then fed into a machine learning model that predicts belowground fungal biodiversity and biomass on a global scale.

=== Expeditions ===
In order to identify mycorrhizal fungi present at a given location, The Society for the Protection of Underground Networks takes soil samples for analysis.

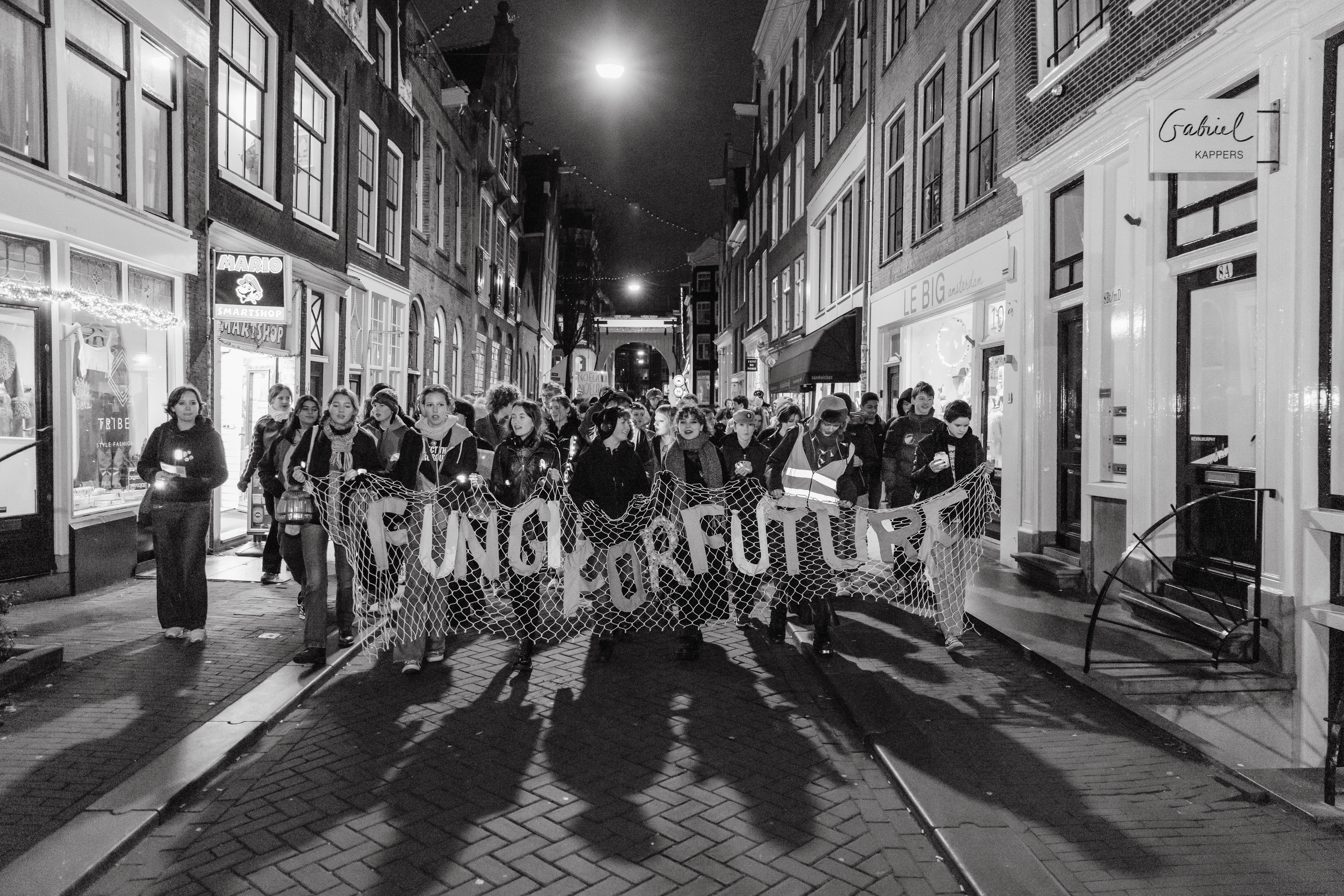
SPUN youth group spun.youth 'Fungi For Future' awareness march Amsterdam 2023.

To date, SPUN has organized expeditions to Ecuador, Colombia, Italy, Palmyra Atoll, Chile, Kazakhstan, Corsica, Ghana, Lesotho, Alaska, Brazil, Tunisia, Peru, and Greece. A number of factors are considered when choosing expedition locations, including sampling intensity at a location, predicted biodiversity, and feasibility of permitting. Locations or eco-regions that have had less intense sampling in the past are given priority. For certain groups of mycorrhizal fungi, SPUN found that over 70% of Earth's ecosystems were unsampled as of 2025.

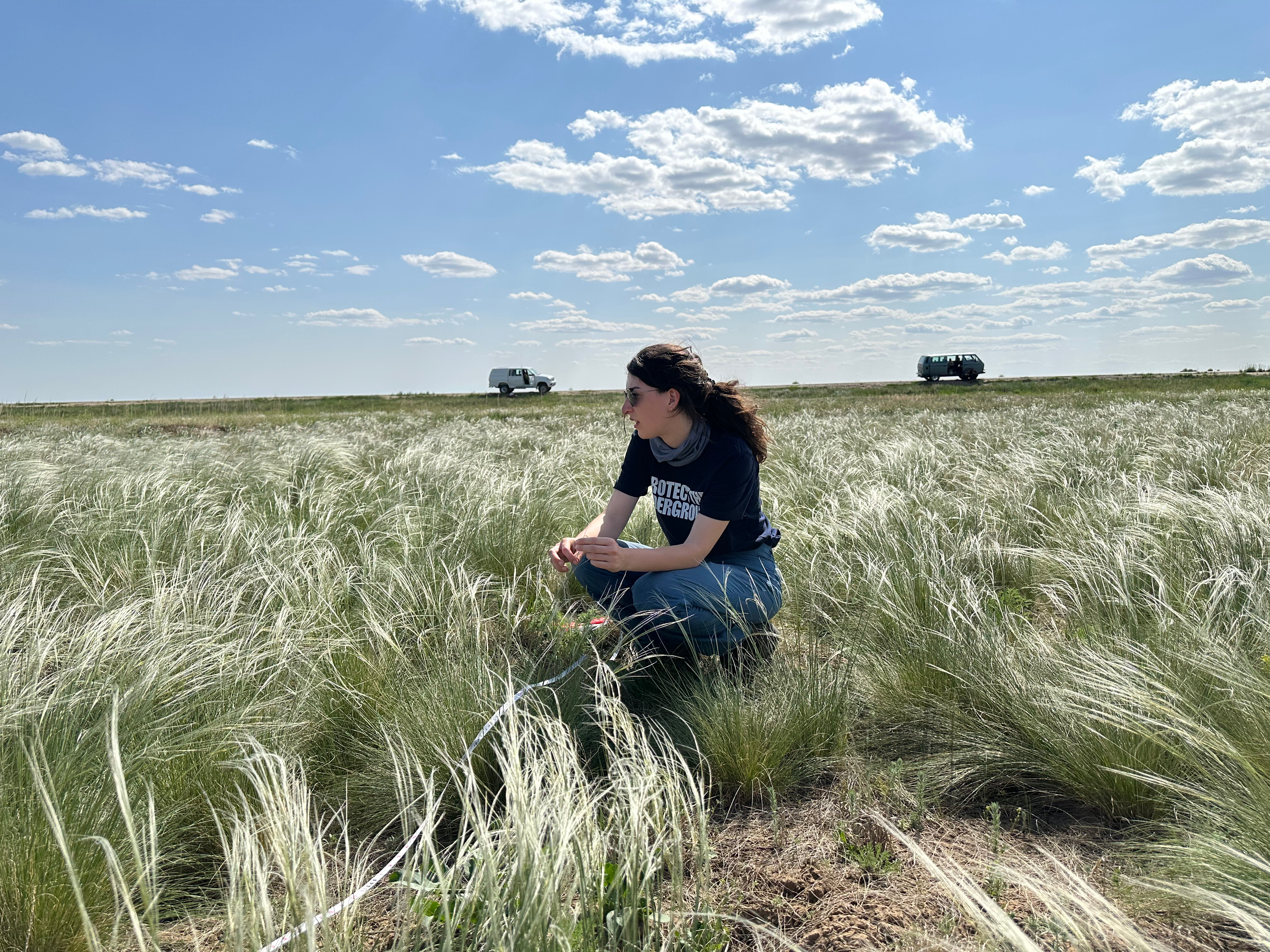
SPUN scientist Dr. Bethan Manley samples soil for mycorrhizal fungi in Kazakhstan.

=== Sampling ===
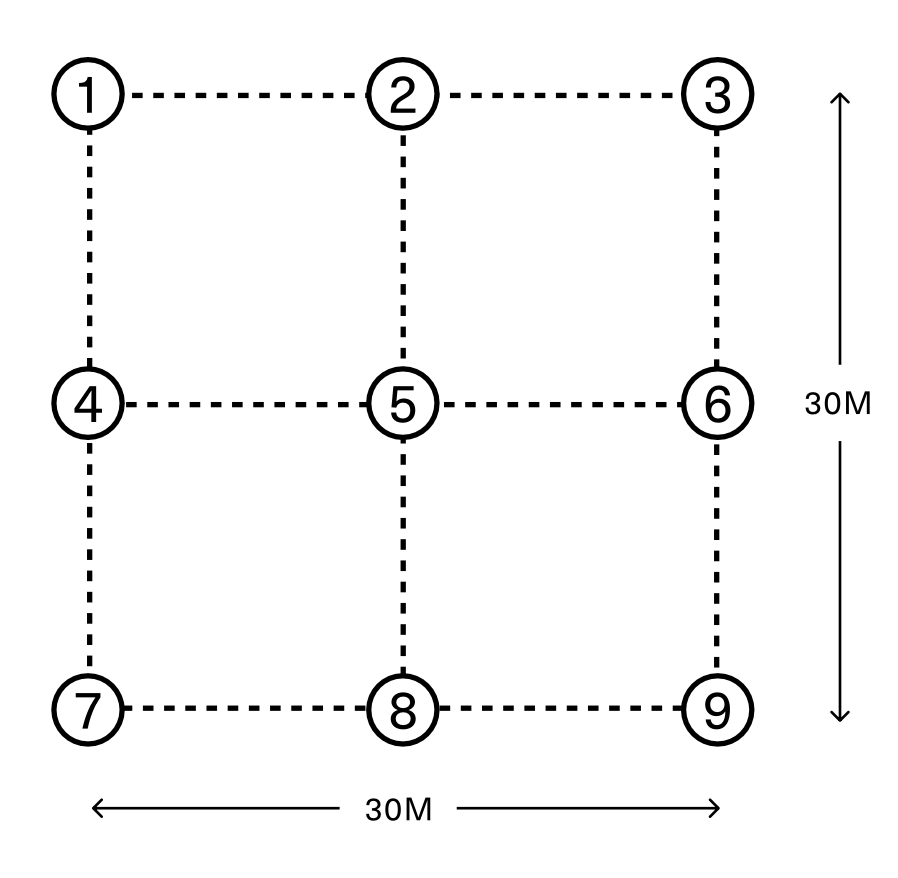
SPUN diagram of sampling protocol

SPUN follows a standardized sampling protocol (see External links below) for collecting soil samples. Soil cores are taken at nine points in a geolocated grid. These soil cores are then homogenized into a single soil sample. Metadata concerning botanical life, land use, and collaborators are recorded.

=== DNA extraction and sequencing ===
In a lab, fungal DNA is extracted from the soil samples. This DNA is sent to be sequenced and then run through a bioinformatics pipeline that assigns a fungal taxon to each sequence present.

=== Mapping ===
The geo-located fungal taxa from the samples are then fed into a machine learning model that predicts below-ground fungal biodiversity on a global scale. These maps are used to determine future expedition locations and provide recommendations for conservation priorities.

=== Biodiversity Mapping ===
In 2025 the Society for the Protection of Underground Networks released an interactive map of Earth's mycorrhizal fungi called "Mycorrhizal Biodiversity Map V1.0". The Underground Atlas, as it is also called, maps predictive biodiversity of fungal communities across the planet. Utilising as many as 2.8 billion fungal DNA sequences from 130 countries, the map's makers demonstrate that more than 90% of the planet's mycorrhizal ecosystems are unprotected.

=== Carbon Research ===
A study led by Justin Stewart, an evolutionary biologist at SPUN, estimated that for just a single group of fungi, AMF, the resource transfer of carbon from plants to arbuscular mycorrhizal fungi sustains a standing stock of 110 quadrillion kilometers of hyphae in Earth's topsoils, roughly 1 billion times the distance from Earth to the Sun, and weighing roughly 5 times the biomass of all humans on Earth. This work has developed into the Mycorrhizal Infrastructure Map, which found that wild grasslands hold approximately 40% of Earth's hyphal networks. The Society for the Protection of Underground Networks scientists and collaborators also published a paper that estimates that 13 billion tons of CO_{2} is allocated to mycorrhizal fungi (multiple groups) annually.

== Underground Explorers (Program) ==
In addition to SPUN-led sampling efforts the organization runs a program called Underground Explorers, that funds mycorrhizal research in under explored regions. As of August 2024 the program has awarded grants to 92 researchers in 43 different countries. 82% of grantees are based in the Global South.

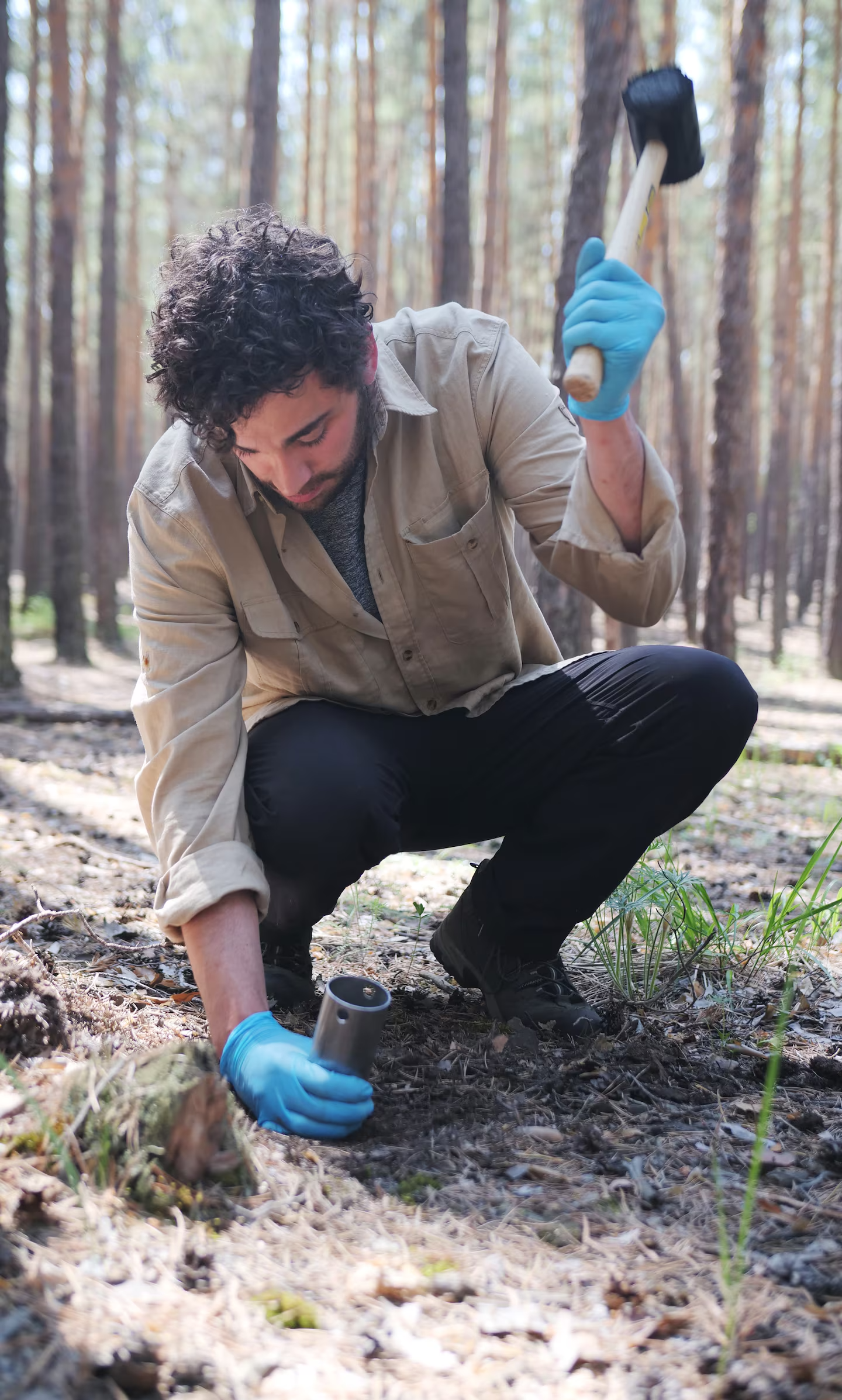
Dr. Justin Stewart, an evolutionary biologist working at SPUN, takes a soil sample near Burabay, Kazakhstan (Photo Yevgeniy Lechsenko)

== Advisors ==
The Society for the Protection of Underground Networks works closely with a number of scientists and leaders from around the world. SPUN's advisory board members are Merlin Sheldrake, Giuliana Furci, Michael Pollan, and Paul Hawken. Jane Goodall was a board member until her death in 2025.

== Conservation partners ==
The Society for the Protection of Underground Networks works with The Nature Conservancy, the Fungi Foundation, The Royal Society for the Protection of Birds, and The Association for Conservation of Biodiversity in Kazakhstan among others.

== Funders ==
The Society for the Protection of Underground Networks has received funding from philanthropic family foundations including The Grantham Foundation for the Protection of the Environment, the Schmidt Family Foundation, The Paul G. Allen Family Foundation, Quadrature Climate Foundation, and The Mighty Arrow Family Foundation among others.
