= Rudolph Koenig =

German businessman, instrument maker and physicist (1832–1901)

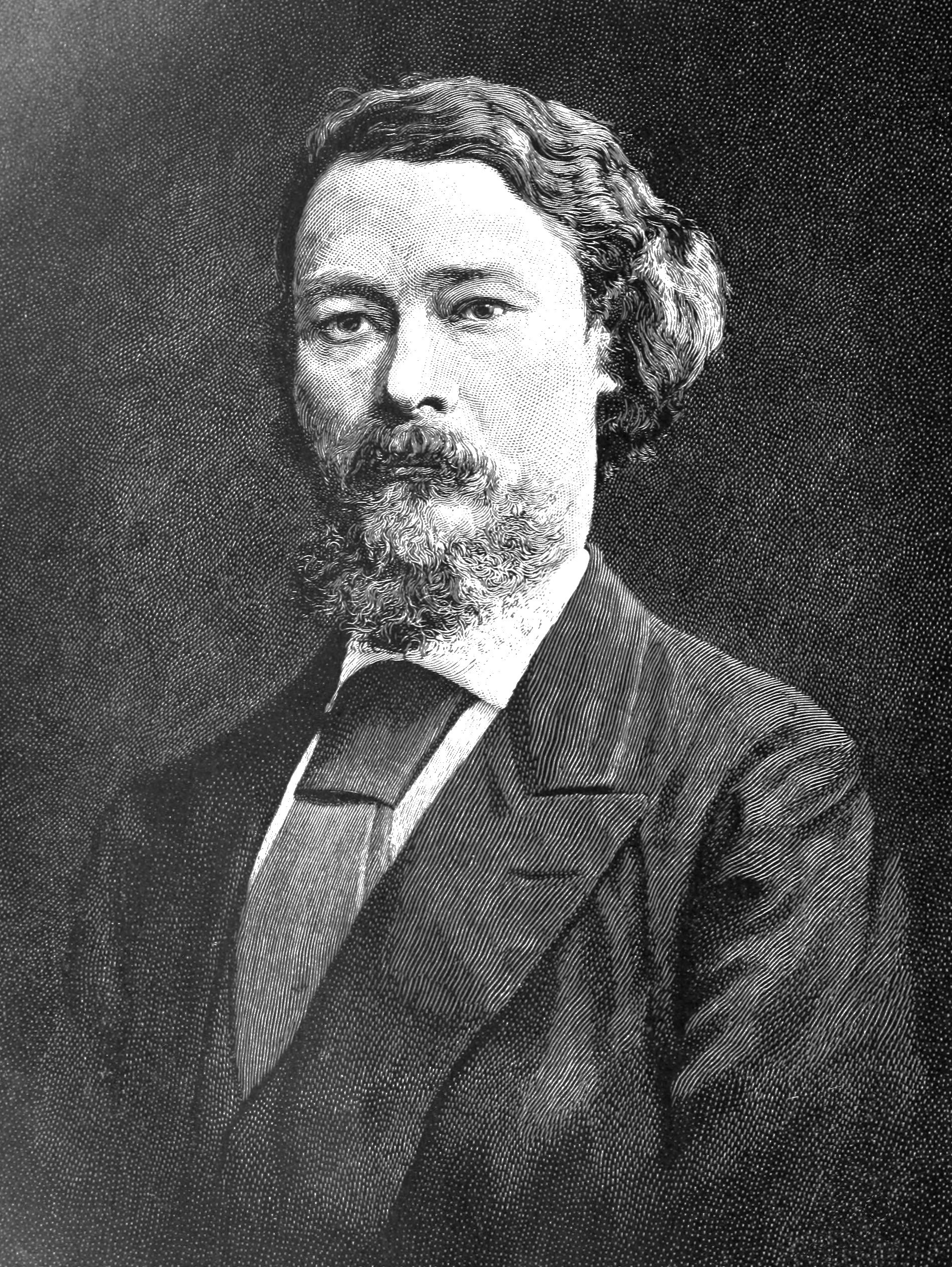
- Portrait c. 1890s
- Born: 26 November 1832; Königsberg, Prussia
- Died: 2 October 1901 (aged 68); Paris, France
- Known for: Koenig's manometric flame apparatus

Karl Rudolph Koenig (26 November 1832 – 2 October 1901) was a German businessman, instrument maker, and physicist, chiefly concerned with acoustic phenomena. He was best known for designing and building acoustical instruments such as the tuning fork and sound analyser.

== Family and personal life ==
Karl Rudolph Koenig was born in Königsberg of Prussia on 26 November 1832, a descendant of a prominent Königsberg family. Koenig was raised along with his three sisters by his mother: Mathilde (Preuss) Koenig, who came from a craftsman and musical family background, and his father Johann Friedrich Koenig, a professor of mathematics and physics who had studied under the famous Friedrich Bessel. In 1851, Koenig moved to Paris, living in an apartment along the Île Saint-Louis. He lived alone and was never married.

== Education ==
Rudolph had little education past high school. He attended primary school and had the usual high school at gymnasium. The extent of his formal education was completed in his hometown where his father was among the faculty. Early on it was clear that Rudolph had a keen ear for music and a good sense toward art and literature. Past secondary school, Rudolph began to study physics and mathematics on his own. His self studies were focused early on tone and psychoacoustics. Eventually, he turned to focus more on mechanics and physics. In 1968, he was awarded an honorary doctorate at the University of Koenigsberg.

== Career ==
Karl Rudolph Koenig was known to be a great craftsman, but a lesser known interest of his was physics. Sounds in particular were a fascination of his, to the point that he spent a large amount of time and money doing research on acoustics. Early on in life, he took a position as an apprentice in the workshop of violin maker Jean-Baptiste Vuillaume. Koenig spent seven years working under Vuillaume until 1858 when he started his own business. In 1859, he released his first work on acoustic apparatus. Koenig's instruments, not just his tuning forks, are still used in the present day.

The business started in his apartment which consisted of a living room, bedroom, and a workshop along with the laboratory. It was a small and quiet place where Koenig worked with his passion of acoustics and music. He would spend most of his free time and money on this same passion. In 1861, Koenig grasped an opportunity to expand and moved his business to Lycée Louis-le-Grand/

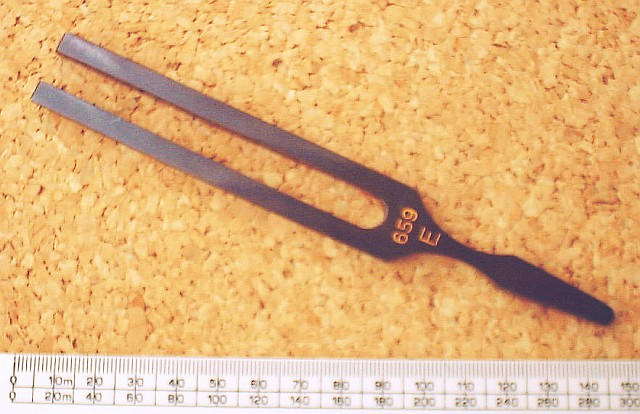
Example of a tuning fork by John Walker showing note (E) and frequency in hertz (659).

The business employed about three workers; nevertheless, Koenig crafted nearly all of his own instruments. He personally checked and tuned every instrument that was produced. He was well known in his time for making instrumentation of high quality.

Although Koenig's lab and workshop were in a quiet place, this did not stop scientists and many other people such as Dayton C. Miller from coming to visit.

== Harmonic Motion ==
Koenig did not stop at just making instruments however. He would go on to study the graphic method for harmonic motion to which he devoted much time. He even further expanded to compound harmonic motion for both parallel and rectangular vibrations. These studies helped him to present his apparatus in London in 1862 at an international exhibition. This marked the beginning of using the graphic method for other purposes besides just in laboratories.

== Products ==
Karl Rudolph Koenig produced a variety of devices and acoustic instruments. These devices and instruments include a sound analyzer, tuning forks, double risen, wave machines, resonators, devices for sound visualization, and obtaining ultrasonic frequencies etc.

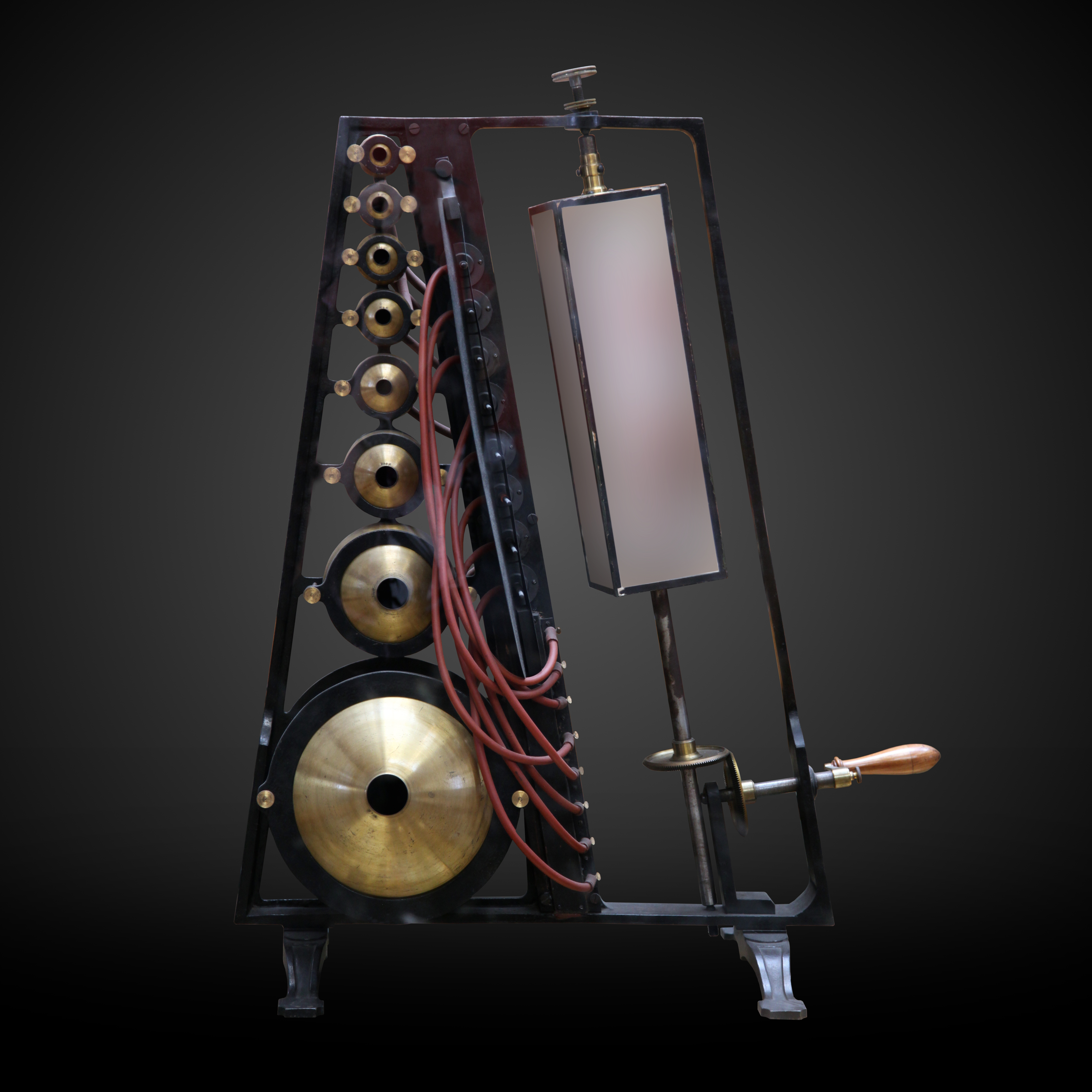
Sound analyser with 8 resonator balls, by Koenig, 1880, Conservatoire national des Arts et Métiers.

Koenig's manometric flame apparatus (1862), used to visualize sound waves. Air pressure from an acoustic phone altered the flame provided by a Bunsen gas flame, which was amplified by a rotating mirror and recorded

One of Koenig's more interesting devices was a watch with the escapement consisting of a tuning fork that could calibrate the main frequencies of any sound. This apparatus helped Koenig establish the frequencies of musical tones and allowed him to build a musical scale.

Another apparatus was a phonograph which could collect sounds by means of a pavilion. It could automatically record them in a rotating cylinder by means of a point. Some years later, Thomas Edison developed this device to build the Phonograph known today.

Among many other products, Koenig also built measuring instruments which were composed of resonators. He also authored various works on limits of hearing, the physical characterization of vowels and the combination of tones.

In the late 1800s Koenig found out that people were making cheap copies of his acoustical apparatus. He complained about these knock off instruments, stating that some even had his name on them despite the fact that he had nothing to do with their creation.

== Timeline ==
In 1859, Koenig both published his first catalog, and inverted the phonograph which would play a crucial role for the graphical analysis of sound. By inverting the phonograph, Rudolph made it easier to record and store sounds made by the vibrations of air particles. Around 1860, along with Hermann von Helmholtz, Rudolph Koenig worked to devise an electronically controlled sound. After working alongside him, Koenig became the main maker and seller of Helmholtz's instruments such as the Helmholtz resonantor. Two years following this in 1862, he began to exhibit the manometric flame apparatus at the London Exhibition. This was the first time his manometric flame apparatus was displayed to the public.

In 1865, Koenig published his second catalog, and was awarded a gold medal from the Societe d'Encouragement pOllr l'lndustrie ntuionale for the use of his instruments in working with the study of acoustics. In 1867, his apparatus collection was exhibited in Paris. After few exhibitions, many of Koenig's products began to be sold internationally. A few years following in 1868 he presented all this catalog at the Paris universal exhibition where about 70% of his production was sold.

His wave-sirens as well as most of his other products were shown at Philadelphia exhibition in 1876 at the London Exhibition. The expansion into the United States was met with difficulties. Koenig's expectations for the expansion of his business were not working as he had hoped. He did have some help from his customers, but was not pleased with the results. This led to Koenig having to travel to America in order to retrieve his leftover products and bring them back. It was decided to no longer take part in the exhibition. Following all of this he decided to start doing more of his own research, and also began to write many scientific articles while improving upon his instruments. In 1882 Koenig published Quelques expériences d'acoustique which was the book over his research research of scientific works.

After his death in 1901, some of Koenig's equipment was sent and is now maintained in Conservatoire des Arts et Métiers, Paris. The Smithsonian Institution has since began a collection of Koenig's apparatus including some of his tuning forks. These were donated to the museum by the U.S. Military Academy. Another large collection of Koenig's apparatuses is owned by the University of Toronto's physics department.

== See also ==
- Additive synthesis
- Phonautograph
