= Family Constellations =

Form of pseudotherapy

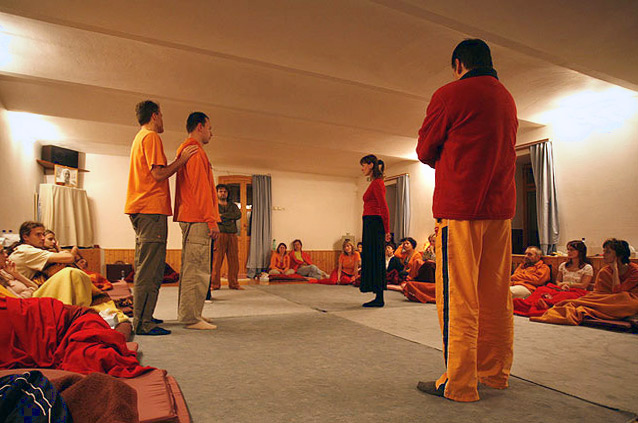
Family Constellations session

Family Constellations, also known as Systemic Constellations and Systemic Family Constellations, is a pseudoscientific therapeutic method which draws on elements of family systems therapy, existential phenomenology and Zulu beliefs and attitudes to family.

== Background ==
Family Constellations diverges significantly from conventional forms of cognitive, behaviour and psychodynamic psychotherapy. The method has been described by physicists as an example of quantum mysticism, and its founder Bert Hellinger incorporated the existing pseudoscientific concept of morphic resonance into his explanation of it. Positive outcomes from the therapy have been attributed to conventional explanations such as suggestion, empathy, and the placebo effect.

The term "Family Constellations" was first used by Alfred Adler to describe the relational position of an individual within a family system and the influence of family dynamics on psychological development.

== Outline ==
The contemporary therapeutic approach known as Family Constellations was later developed by Bert Hellinger in the late 20th century. Hellinger’s method integrates elements of family systems therapy, existential phenomenology, and group-based therapeutic techniques, and was also influenced by his experiences with Zulu cultural practices during his time as a missionary in South Africa.

His approach proposes that psychological difficulties may be linked to unresolved issues or traumas within previous generations of a family, a concept he described as "systemic entanglements."

A constellation session is a one-time event, with no follow-up. It may take place in front of a large audience.

Practitioners claim that present-day problems and difficulties may be influenced by traumas suffered in previous generations of the family, even if those affected are unaware of the original event. Hellinger referred to the relation between present and past problems that are not caused by direct personal experience as systemic entanglements, said to occur when unresolved trauma has afflicted a family through an event such as murder, suicide, death of a mother in childbirth, early death of a parent or sibling, war, natural disaster, emigration, or abuse.

== Criticism ==
Małgorzata Talarczyk of The Child and Adolescent Psychiatry Clinic, Poznań University of Medical Sciences in Poland has criticized the family constellation method as not meeting many of aspects of the Polish Code of Ethics for Psychiatrists. In particular, she found that it was inadequate in the areas of "the process, contract, diagnosis, supervision, confidentiality, alternativeness." Thus it is difficult to consider it as "psychotherapy". In systemic family therapy, figure placement techniques like the Kvebaek Family Sculpting Technique and the Family System Test evolved from the family constellation method. These standardized methods use figures and grids to quantitatively assess interpersonal structures (e.g., distance and hierarchies) as evidence-based clinical tools in practice and research.

== See also ==
- Internal Family Systems Model
