= Giuliana Furci =

Chilean mycologist

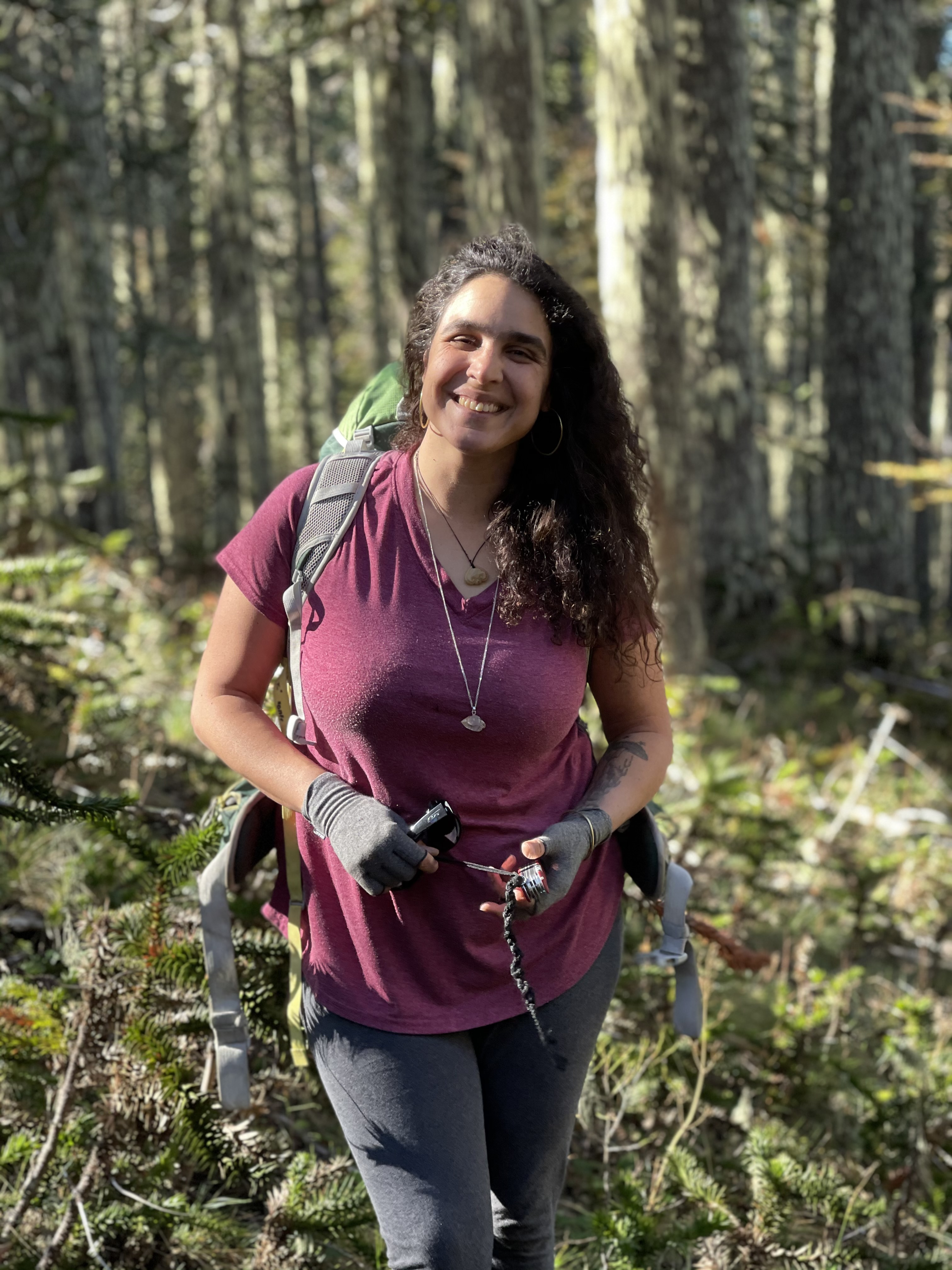
- Furci in 2021
- Born: August 12, 1978 (age 48); London
- Occupations: Mycologist, Speaker, Author
- Known for: Fungal conservation
- Title: Dame, Order of the Star of Italy
- Children: 1
- Awards: Gordon & Tina Wasson Award
- Website: https://giulianafurci.com

Giuliana Furci OSI (born Giuliana Maria Furci George-Nascimento; born 12 August 1978) is a field mycologist, speaker, author, and founder and executive director of the Fungi Foundation. She is a Harvard University associate, National Geographic Explorer, Dame of the Order of the Star of Italy, deputy chair of the IUCN Fungal Conservation Committee, and author of several titles including a series of field guides to Chilean fungi and co-author of titles such as the 1st State of the World's Fungi and the publication delimiting the term “funga” and the 3F Proposal - Fauna, Flora & Funga. She has published two field guides on Chilean fungi: Guías de campo Hongos de Chile Volumen I and Volumen II. Giuliana has held consulting positions in U.S. philanthropic foundations as well as full-time positions in international and Chilean marine conservation non-profits.

Furci sits on the Board of Fundación Acción Fauna and Los Cedros Fund, on the advisory board of the Society for the Protection of Underground Networks (SPUN), and other organizations. She has received several distinctions including being named a Fellow of the International Mycological Association in 2024, the 2022 Buffett/National Geographic Leadership in Conservation in Latin America Award, 2022 recipient of the Steward of Biodiversity Award from the McKenna Academy, R. Gordon Wasson and Tina Wasson Award from the Mycological Society of America, the 2013 Presidents Award from the International Society for Fungal Conservation. As a field mycologist, she helped describe three new species: Amanita galactica, Cortinarius chlorosplendidus, and Psilocybe stametsii. She has conducted mycological expeditions in nearly 20 countries.

== Biography ==
Furci was born in London to a Chilean mother (Ximena George-Nascimento) and Italian father (Carmelo Furci). Furci is the great-granddaughter of Carlos George-Nascimento, founder of Editorial Nascimento. Her mother was a Chilean refugee who had fled her country because of the 1973 coup, having been a political prisoner between 1973 and 1974. Her father was from the village of Dinami in Calabria, Italy.

At the age of 14, Furci left London for Chile with her mother.

== Career ==
In 1999, Furci began her career as a self-taught mycologist while studying aquaculture in the Universidad de Los Lagos in Osorno, Chile. She traveled through Chile documenting fungi from 2000 to 2005 with her colleague Carolina Magnasco; together they produced over 6,000 photographs and collected hundreds of fungi specimens.

In 2005, Furci flew to Washington State to study with Paul Stamets on growing fungi. Upon her return to Chile, Magnasco and Furci opened a reishi cultivation farm in Santiago called “Fungi Australe SA” which operated for 2 years.

In 2007, Furci wrote her first book “Fungi Austral”, a field guide to Chilean fungi. From late 2005-2010 she worked for Terram Foundation as the salmon farming program coordinator.

In 2012, Furci founded the Fundación Fungi (Fungi Foundation). Her work triggered the inclusion of fungi in Chilean environmental legislation. Fundación Fungi was the first NGO in the world dedicated to the protection of fungi, and has offices in Chile and the USA.

Furci is the curator of the FFCL Fungarium, which is continuously studied in collaboration with experts from Harvard University, Conicet Argentina, and the University of Florida.

== Media and awards ==
Furci has been recognized and awarded by the McKenna Academy, Mycological Society of America and the National Geographic Society. Her work with the Fungi Foundation has been featured in international media such as the New York Times, the Guardian, Science Magazine, BBC, The Atlantic and the Times of India.

Furci is the recipient of the Order of the Star of Italy.

Furci's work has been featured in the documentary Fantastic Fungi and National Geographic's short film Flora Fauna Funga. Furthermore, the Fungi Foundation has produced two short documentaries showcasing her work: 10 Days in the Forest and Let Things Rot.

== Eponyms of Giulinana Furci ==
=== Eponymous species ===
- Geomorium furciae Kraisit., Pfister & M.E.Sm.

== Selected publications ==
- Kuhar, F.; Furci, G.; Drechsler-Santos, E. R.; Pfister, D. H. (2018). "Delimitation of Funga as a valid term for the diversity of fungal communities: The Fauna, Flora & Funga proposal (FF&F)". IMA Fungus. 9 (2): A71–A74. doi:10.1007/BF03449441. hdl:11336/88035.
- Gonçalves, S. C.; Haelewaters, D.; Furci, G.; Mueller, G. M. (2021). "Include all fungi in biodiversity goals". Science. 373 (6553): 403–403. doi:10.1126/science.abk1312.
