= Cosmo Sheldrake =

English musician (born 1989)

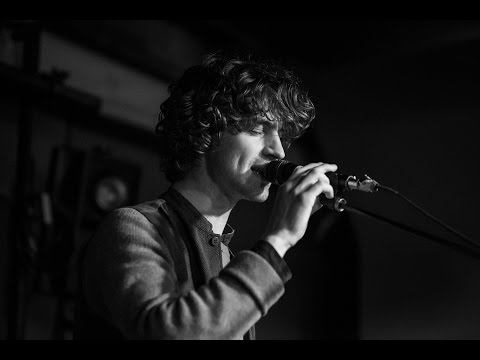
- Sheldrake performing in 2015

Background information
- Born: Cosmo Christopher Sheldrake; 16 December 1989 (age 36); London, England
- Genres: Baroque pop; electronic; folktronica; indie
- Occupations: Musician; composer; record producer
- Instruments: Keyboard; vocals; double bass; drums; guitar; banjo; clarinet; percussion; sousaphone
- Years active: 2014—present
- Website: cosmosheldrake.com

Cosmo Christopher Sheldrake is an English musician, composer, and producer. He released his first single, "The Moss"/"Solar", in 2014 and followed it up with the Pelicans We EP in 2015. Sheldrake has since released three full-length albums and written the scores to the films Galápagos (2019) and Digger (2026).

== Biography ==
=== Early life and education ===
Sheldrake is the son of the parapsychologist Rupert Sheldrake and the voice teacher Jill Purce, and the brother of the mycologist Merlin Sheldrake. Sheldrake was privately educated at University College School in Hampstead, London, part of the Eton Group. He attended school alongside Jack Steadman of Bombay Bicycle Club. He later studied anthropology at the University of Sussex.

=== Career ===
Described as a "musical visionary" by The Telegraph, Sheldrake has been releasing music since 2014.

His debut single, "The Moss", was released on 25 March 2014, followed by a debut EP, Pelicans We, on 6 April 2015, and a debut album, The Much Much How How and I, on 6 April 2018. His second album, Wake Up Calls was released on 18 September 2020. His third album, Eye to the Ear, was released on 12 April 2024.

Sheldrake founded and runs the record label Tardigrade Records, with Moth Records as an imprint. In 2015, he included "Tardigrade Song" on his EP Pelicans We, imagining himself as a tardigrade.

Much of Sheldrake's work is concerned with improvisation, nonsense, and the sonorous environment. He has provided music for film and theatre, including the score for a series of Samuel Beckett plays at the Young Vic in London. Sheldrake also performs solo and with several bands including Johnny Flynn & the Sussex Wit and the Gentle Mystics. His song "Come Along" was featured in an advertisement for Apple's iPhone XR in the US and UK. The song subsequently charted at number 39 on the US Digital Songs chart dated 26 January 2019.

Sheldrake's single "No. 3", released in 2022, features in an advertisement for Apple, of the Mac Studio and Apple Studio Display.

In 2026, Sheldrake composed the score for the comedy film Digger, marking his debut at composing for a feature film.

== Discography ==
=== Albums ===
| Title | Details |
|---|---|
| The Much Much How How and I | Released: 6 April 2018; Label: Transgressive, Tardigrade; Format: CD, digital download, vinyl |
| Wake Up Calls | Released: 18 September 2020; Label: Tardigrade; Format: Digital download, vinyl |
| Eye to the Ear | Released: 12 April 2024; Label: Tardigrade Records; Format: CD, digital download, vinyl |

=== Soundtracks ===
| Title | Details |
|---|---|
| Galápagos | Released: 13 December 2019; Label: Tardigrade; Format: Digital download; Composed for an episode of the docuseries Moving Art (2014–2019) |
| Digger | Released: 2026 |

=== EPs ===
| Title | Details |
|---|---|
| Pelicans We | Released: 6 April 2015; Label: Transgressive / PIAS Group; Format: CD, digital download, vinyl |
| Do | Released: 2021; Label: Tardigrade Records |
| Wild Wet World | Released: 26 April 2023; Label: Tardigrade Records; Format: Digital download, vinyl |

=== Singles ===
List of singles with selected details
| Title | Year | Album |
|---|---|---|
| "The Moss" | 2014 | Non-album singles |
| "The Woods" (with Erin Robinsong) | 2017 | Non-album singles |
| "In Berlin" (with Deep Throat Choir) | 2018 | Non-album singles |
| "Run Rings Right Wrongs" | 2018 | Non-album singles |
| "I Threw a Rock Into the Sea" | 2018 | Non-album singles |
| "Owl Song" | 2019 | Wake Up Calls |
| "Orby/Prefusify" | 2019 | Non-album singles |
| "Nightingale Wake Up Calls" | 2020 | Non-album singles |
| "Cuckoo Song" | 2020 | Wake Up Calls |
| "Beech" (with Robert Macfarlene) | 2020 | Non-album singles |
| "No. 3" | 2022 | Non-album singles |
| "Bathed in Sound" | 2023 | Wild Wet World |
| "Stop the Music" | 2024 | Eye to the Ear |
| "Old Ocean" | 2024 | Eye to the Ear |
| "Interdimensional" | 2024 | Eye to the Ear |
| "Song of the Cedars" | 2024 | Non-album singles |
| "Soil (feat. NATURE)" | 2024 | Non-album singles |
