= Koenig's manometric flame apparatus =

Physical instrument used to visualize sound waves, invented by Rudolph Koenig

Koenig's manometric flame apparatus (1862)

Koenig's manometric flame apparatus was a laboratory instrument invented in 1862 by the German physicist Rudolph Koenig, and used to visualize sound waves. It was the nearest equivalent of the modern oscilloscope in the late nineteenth and early twentieth centuries.

== Description ==
The manometric flame apparatus consisted of a chamber which acted in the same way as a modern microphone. Sound from the source to be measured was concentrated by means of a horn or tube into one half of the capsule chamber. The chamber was divided in two by an elastic diaphragm, usually rubber. The sound caused the diaphragm to vibrate which modulated a flow of flammable illumination gas passing through the other half of the chamber. The illumination gas was passed to a Bunsen burner, the flame of which would then increase or decrease in size at the same frequency as the sound source.

The change in flame size was too fast to be easily seen with the naked eye, and a stroboscope — usually in the form of a rotating many sided mirror — was used to view the flame. The frequency of the sound could then be calculated from the apparent distance between the flame images in the mirror and the known speed of its rotation.

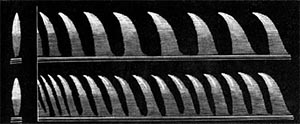
The bunsen flame of the manometric flame apparatus seen in the rotating mirror. From Rudolph Koenig's catalogue of 1865

Alexander Graham Bell used this type of equipment to study the performance of his microphones and demonstrated it in his display at the 1876 Philadelphia Centenarian Exhibition. He replaced the rubber diaphragm with an iron disc which was driven by an electromagnet with current fed from a microphone. This apparatus was capable of giving quantitative measures of the performance of his microphones.

A type of Fourier analyzer can be constructed by connecting a number of manometric flame capsules each to a Helmholtz resonator tuned to either the fundamental frequency of the sound to be analyzed, or one of its harmonics. The flames produced from each capsule are then an indication of the strength of each of the Fourier components of the sound.
