= Stimmung =

1968 music piece by Karlheinz Stockhausen

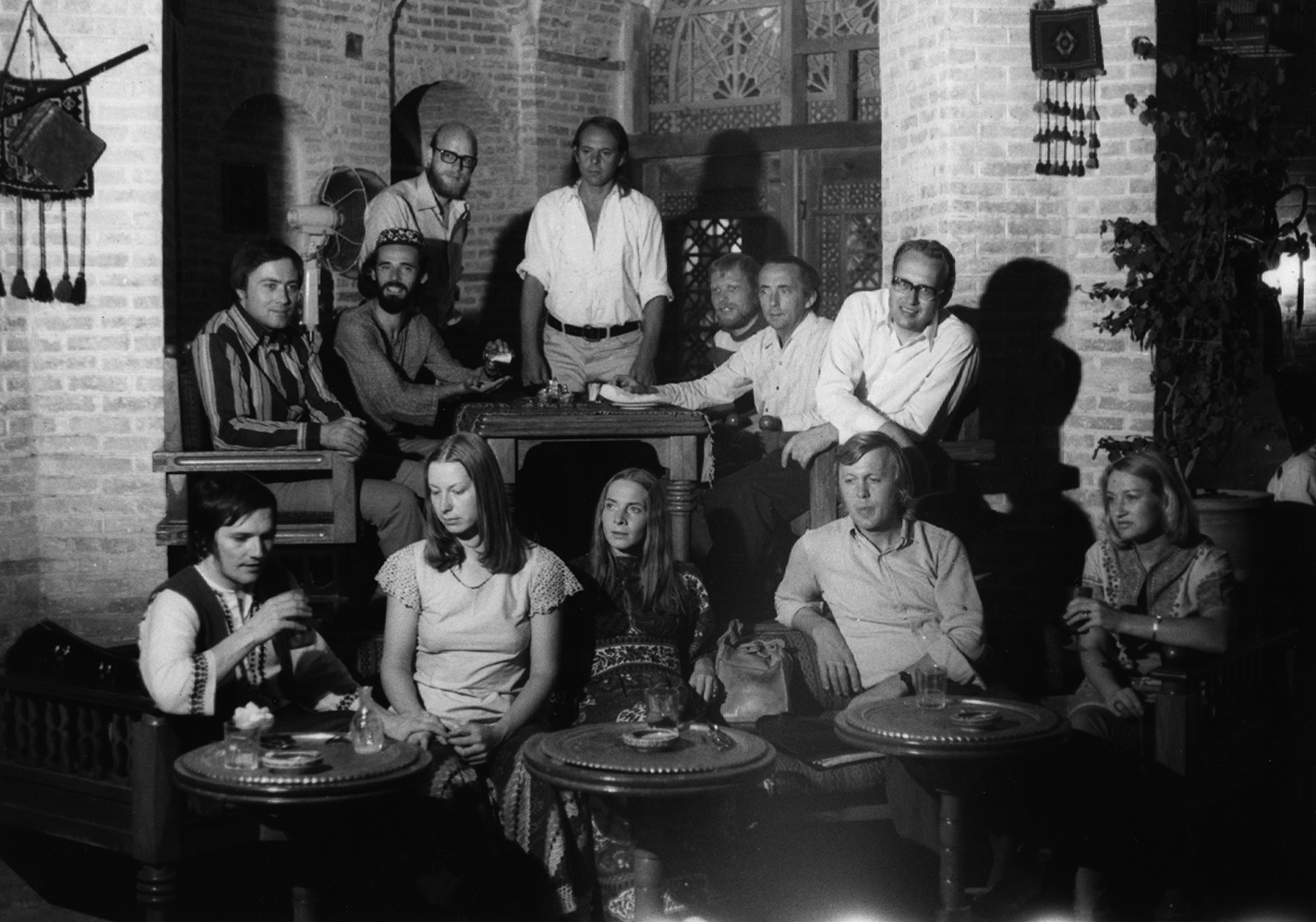
Shiraz Arts Festival September 1972: back (standing), technician Volker Müller, composer Karlheinz Stockhausen, with the Collegium Vocale Köln (amongst others): Karl O. Barkey, Hans-Aldrich Billig, Wolfgang Lüttgen, Günther Engels, Christoph Caskel, front, Péter Eötvös, Dagmar von Biel, Gaby Rodens, Wolfgang Fromme, Helga Hamm-Albrecht

Stimmung, for six vocalists and six microphones, is a piece by Karlheinz Stockhausen, written in 1968 and commissioned by the City of Cologne for the Collegium Vocale Köln. Its average length is seventy-four minutes, and it bears the work number 24 in the composer's catalog.

Both a tonal and a serial composition, it is "the first major Western composition to be based entirely on the production of vocal harmonics", and the first "to use overtones as a primary element". An additional innovation is "the unique kind of rhythmic polyphony which arises from the gradual transformation/assimilation of rhythmic models".

== Title ==
The German word Stimmung [ˈʃtɪmʊŋ] has several meanings, including "tuning" and "mood". The word is the noun formed from the verb stimmen, which means "to harmonize, to be correct", and related to Stimme (voice). The primary sense of the title "implies not only the outward tuning of voices or instruments, but also the inward tuning of one's soul". According to the composer, the word

means "tuning," but it really should be translated with many other words because Stimmung incorporates the meanings of the tuning of a piano, the tuning of the voice, the tuning of a group of people, the tuning of the soul. This is all in the German word. Also, when you say: We're in a good Stimmung, you mean a good psychological tuning, being well tuned together.

== Overview ==
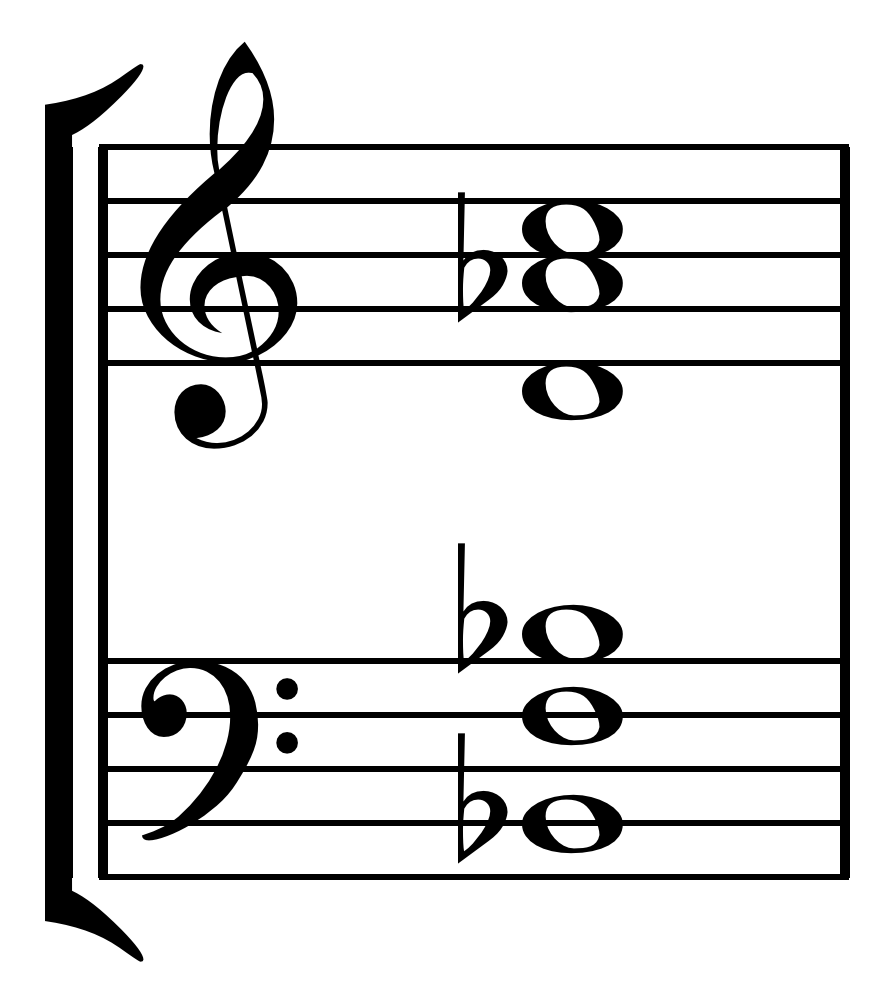
Main pitches: harmonics of B♭_{1}

Stimmung is written in just intonation. Six singers amplified by six microphones tune to a low B♭_{1} drone, inaudible to the audience, and expand upwards through overtone singing, with that low B♭'s harmonics 2, 3, 4, 5, 7, and 9 (B♭_{2}, F+_{2}, B♭_{3}, D_{4}, A♭+_{4}, and C+_{5}) becoming in turn fundamentals for overtone singing. It is composed using what the composer called moment form, and consists of 51 sections (called "moments").

The harmonies of Stimmung are composed from 108 pitches: twelve different tones for each of the three women's voices, and twenty-four for each of the three men. Not only do the performers produce partials from the overtone series in each note they sing, but all of the fundamental tones are also related by whole-number overtone ratios. In this way, overtones are composed upon overtones, generating a range of degrees of harmonic fusion.

According to the 1986 Hyperion Singcircle liner notes:

In each section a new overtone melody or 'model' is introduced and repeated several times. Each female voice leads a new section eight times, and each male voice, nine times. Some of the other singers gradually have to transform their own material until they have come into 'identity' with the lead singer of the section ... by adopting the same ... tempo, rhythm and dynamics. When the lead singer feels that 'identity' has been reached, he or she makes a gesture to another singer who leads the next section. Each model is a set of rhythmic phonetic patterns, often with actual words used as their basis, such as 'Hallelujah' or 'Saturday'.
In 29 of the sections, 'magic names' are called out. These are the names of gods and goddesses from many cultures—Aztec, aboriginal and Ancient Greek, for instance—and have to be incorporated into the character of the model. The erotic and intimate love-poems that are recited were written by Stockhausen 'during amorous days' in 1967.

The order of the rhythmic models and the distribution of the poems and "magic names" are decided by the performers, but the sequence of pitches in the 51 moments is fixed. Though the 1968 "Paris version" used by the Collegium Vocale Köln at the world première has been published (as No. 24½ in Stockhausen's catalog), the 1977 "Singcircle version" (directed by Gregory Rose) has been well documented in Rose and Emmerson 1979, and both versions have been performed throughout the world. Singcircle performances include the Round House on 21 November 1977, a 1977 BBC Promenade Concert at the Royal Albert Hall, in Liverpool's Anglican Cathedral as part of the 1980 Hope Street Festival, and at the Barbican in 1985, with the composer at the mixing desk. Singcircle's performance at the 2005 City of London Festival was recorded and broadcast on BBC Radio 3's Hear and Now on 20 August 2005. In 2003, Paul Hillier made a "Copenhagen version" for the Theatre of Voices, which he directed. This version, too, has been performed on tour, and a recording has been released on CD. Other groups that have performed Stimmung include the London Sinfonietta Voices, Ensemble Belcanto, Neue Vocalsolisten Stuttgart, the Aquarius Consort, Nordic Voices, and the Dunedin Consort, according to the performance database of Universal Edition.

== Influences and reception ==
Stockhausen himself attributes a month spent walking among ruins in Mexico as his primary influence, Stimmung recreating that 'magic' space. On the other hand, he also describes the snow on frozen Long Island Sound in February and March 1968, when he was composing Stimmung in Madison, Connecticut, as "the only landscape I really saw during the composition of the piece". In a letter to Gregory Rose written on 24 July 1982 (printed in the liner notes to Hyperion CDA66115), he describes how, in the small house his wife Mary had rented it was only possible for him to work at night because their two small children needed quiet during the day. He could not sing aloud, as he had done initially, but began to hum quietly, listening to the overtone melodies. Mary reports that Stockhausen first discovered the technique when listening to their small son Simon producing multiple tones while humming in his crib after falling asleep. In this way, Stockhausen became "the first Western composer to use this technique of singing again—in the Middle Ages it had been practised by women and children in churches, but was later entirely supplanted by masculine Gregorian music".

Some writers have seen the possible influence of Stockhausen's former student La Monte Young and his mid-1960s drone music with the Theatre of Eternal Music:

[Young's] influence on already established composers who were themselves his student mentors is not, however, confined to Cage. Karlheinz Stockhausen's exploration of the harmonic series, notably in Stimmung (1968), has often been linked to Young's example. ... The German composer seems to have visited Young and Zazeela when in New York, in 1964 or 1965, and listened to a rehearsal of The Theatre of Eternal Music. He requested tapes of the group's performances which, perhaps surprisingly, Young gave him. Stockhausen's own musicians visited Young and Zazeela's Dream House installation in Antwerp in 1969. I didn't hear any of Feldman's music until 1962, when I heard a piece of Stockhausen's called Refrain. I only realized later that this was Stockhausen's "Feldman piece" just as Stimmung was his "LaMonte Young piece".

However, another precedent for Stimmung is an unfinished work by Stockhausen himself, begun in 1960 and titled Monophonie, which was to have consisted of the single note E♭. Igor Stravinsky, on the other hand, traces Stimmung's one-note idea back to the pedal point in Henry Purcell's Fantasy upon One Note, and its time-scale to Wagner's Götterdämmerung, while at the same time observing that this time-scale "indicates the need of a musical equivalent to the parking meter".

Stimmung had an enormous impact on many younger composers and has been cited as an important influence on the French spectralist movement of the 1970s.

== Discography ==
- Stockhausen: Stimmung (Paris version). Collegium Vocale Köln: Dagmar Apel, Gaby Rodens, Helga Albrecht, Wolfgang Fromme, Georg Steinhoff, Hans-Alderich Billig (recorded 1969). Deutsche Grammophon 2543 003 (LP), and in Avant Garde Vol. 3 DG 2720 025(6LP boxed set).
- Stockhausen: Stimmung (Paris version). Collegium Vocale Köln: Dagmar von Biel, Gaby Ortmann-Rodens, Helga Hamm-Albrecht, Wolfgang Fromme, Helmut Clemens, Hans-Alderich Billig (recorded 1982). In Deutscher Musikrat: Zeitgenössische Musik in der Bundesrepublik Deutschland 7. Harmonia Mundi DMR 1019-21 (3LP boxed set).

The above two recordings together have been rereleased on CD in the Stockhausen Complete Edition CD 12 A-B (2 CDs).

- Stockhausen: Stimmung (Singcircle version). Singcircle: Suzanne Flowers, Penelope Walmsley-Clark, Nancy Long, Rogers Covey-Crump, Gregory Rose, Paul Hillier, directed by Gregory Rose (recorded 1983). Hyperion CDA66115. Awarded the Diapason d'Or.
- Stockhausen: Stimmung (Copenhagen version). Theatre of Voices: Else Torp, Louise Skovbæch, Clara Sanabras, Wolodymyr Smishkewych, Kasper Eliassen, Andrew Hendricks; Ian Dearden, sound diffusion; directed by Paul Hillier (recorded 2006). Harmonia Mundi CD HMU 807408.
- Stockhausen: Stimmung (Paris version, abridged). (Voices of Silicon Valley): Crista Berryessa, Deirdre Lobo, Alexis Lane Jensen, Alexander Frank, Cyril Deaconoff, Matt Dunn. Directed by Cyril Deaconoff (recorded 2018). Orpheus Classical.
