= Konkrete Etüde =

Electroacoustic tape music composed in 1952

The Konkrete Etüde (Concrète Étude) is the earliest work of electroacoustic tape music by Karlheinz Stockhausen, composed in 1952 and lasting just three-and-a-quarter minutes. The composer retrospectively gave it the number "1/5" in his catalogue of works.

== History ==
In January 1952 Stockhausen travelled to Paris to study with Olivier Messiaen, and by March had become familiar with composers such as Pierre Boulez, Jean Barraqué, and Michel Philippot who were working with musique concrète at Pierre Schaeffer's Club d'Essai. Beginning in November, Stockhausen was able to work in the studio, but only recording and cataloguing natural sounds, mainly of percussion instruments. In December, at last, Stockhausen was allowed to make his own piece. Using sounds recorded from a prepared piano, he cut the tape into short pieces, spliced the pieces together, and superimposed the results. This involved taking the attack segment of each sound and repeating it to produce a relatively constant sound. The result was then transposed using a transposition machine called a phonogène. The entire process was accomplished in twelve days, concluded on 15 December 1952. It was the first piece by a non-French composer made in the Paris studio. Even before completing the piece, Stockhausen was becoming disillusioned with musique concrète. and in a letter to Henri Pousseur written only a few months later, Stockhausen described the Etude as a "negative result".

Long thought to have been lost, the tape of the Etude was, according to one source, rediscovered by Rudolf Frisius; according to another, it was found by the composer himself, "in a pile of old tapes". Even after its rediscovery, Stockhausen did not permit the work to be published until 1992.

There are references to another, earlier and possibly unrealised musique concrète project, Studie über einen Ton (Study on One Sound), in two parts. However, this same title, only in French—Étude sur un seul son—had been used by Boulez for the first of his two concrète études, realised in 1951. Pierre Schaeffer, in an interview conducted many years after the fact, refers to both of these works by the same title and recalled that the tape of Stockhausen's Study on One Sound was only about 50 centimeters long—lasting less than one second at 76.2 cm/s. The situation is further complicated by an entry in a published catalog of Schaeffer's studio, Répertoire acousmatique 1948–1980, naming the last production of 1952 as a work by Stockhausen lasting only 1 min 13 s, and titled Étude "aux mille collants" (Étude of a Thousand Splices). Stockhausen also mentions a failed first attempt at realising the Etude:

Already upon hearing two synchronized layers, and even more so hearing three or four layers, I became increasingly pale and helpless: I had imagined something completely different! On the following day, the sorcery undespairingly continued: I changed my series, chose other sequences, cut other lengths, spliced different progressions, and hoped afresh for a miracle in sound.

== Analysis ==
Stockhausen built the work on a six-by-six number square:

5	3	4	1	6	2
3	1	2	5	4	6
4	2	3	6	5	1
1	5	6	3	2	4
6	4	5	2	1	3
2	6	1	4	3	5

Each row of the square is a transposition onto the successive members of the original row. Durations are based on divisions of tape-length units of 216 cm, which comes to just about three seconds, but is a convenient number for reckoning subdivisions, since 2^{3} × 3^{3} = 216.

Each section is assigned a number of sounds from one to six. Once the number of sounds has been determined, the distribution of sounds within each section is specified by a set of what Stockhausen called "modes". Sounds may start or end together, duration and pitch may be linked (the higher the shorter) or not, and successive sounds may precede or follow silences, yielding six different modes which can be manipulated according to the same number square. These modes were to dominate Stockhausen's works for the next few years, in compositions such as Kontra-Punkte, Studie I, and Studie II.

== Discography ==
- Stockhausen, Karlheinz. Elektronische Musik 1952–1960. Etude, Studie I, Studie II, Gesang der Jünglinge, Kontakte. Stockhausen Complete Edition CD 3. Kürten: Stockhausen-Verlag, 1992.
- Karlheinz Stockhausen, Pierre Boulez: New Directions in Music. Él Records ACMEM193CD. Stockhausen, Konkrete Etüde (1952), Zeitmaße (1955–56), Klavierstück XI (1956, four versions, David Tudor, piano); Boulez, Le Marteau sans maître. London: Él in association with Cherry Red Records, 2010.
