= Sound collage =

Music technique

- Etymology: coller (french word) - means "to stick together" sonus (latin word)
- Other names: Musique concrète, Audio Collage
- Stylistic origins: Musique concrete, Break-in (1950s)
- Cultural origins: 17th century
- Derivative forms: Musique concrète; plunderphonics

Subgenres
- Epic collage

Other topics
- Avant-garde music

In music, montage (lit. "putting together") or sound collage ("gluing together") is a technique where newly branded sound objects or compositions, including songs, are created from collage, also known as musique concrète. This is often done through the use of sampling, while some sound collages are produced by gluing together sectors of different vinyl records. Like its visual cousin, sound collage works may have a completely different effect than that of the component parts, even if the original parts are recognizable or from a single source. Audio collage is a feature of the audio art of John Cage, Fluxus, radio documentary, postmodern hip-hop and postconceptual digital art.

== History ==
The origin of sound collage can be traced back to the works of Biber's programmatic sonata Battalia (1673) and Mozart's Don Giovanni (1789), and certain passages in Mahler symphonies as collage, but the first fully developed collages occur in a few works by Charles Ives, whose piece Central Park in the Dark (1906) creates the feeling of a walk in the city by layering several distinct melodies and quotations on top of each other.

Earlier traditional forms and procedures such as the quodlibet, medley, potpourri, and centonization differ from collage in that the various elements in them are made to fit smoothly together, whereas in a collage clashes of key, timbre, texture, meter, tempo, or other discrepancies are important in helping to preserve the individuality of the constituent elements and to convey the impression of a heterogeneous assemblage. What made their technique true collage, however, was the juxtaposition of quotations and unrelated melodies, either by layering them or by moving between them in quick succession.

A first documented instance of sound collage created as electronic music is Wochenende (in English, Weekend), a collage of words, music and sounds created by film-maker and media artist Walter Ruttmann in 1928. Later, in 1948, Pierre Schaeffer used the techniques of sound collage to create the first piece of musique concrète, Étude aux chemins de fer, which was assembled from recordings of trains. Schaeffer created this piece by recording sounds of trains onto several vinyl records, some of which had lock grooves allowing them to play in a continuous loop. He then set up multiple turntables in his studio, allowing him to trigger and mix together the various train sounds as needed.

According to music theorist Cristina Losada, the third movement of Luciano Berio's Sinfonia is often considered "the prototype of a musical collage." In an essay written in 1937, John Cage expressed an interest in using extra-musical sound materials and came to distinguish between found sounds, which he called noise, and musical sounds, examples of which included: rain, static between radio channels, and "a truck at fifty miles per hour". Cage began in 1939 to create a series of found sounds works that explored his stated aims, the first being Imaginary Landscape #1 for instruments including two variable speed turntables with frequency recordings.

Important modern sound collage pieces were created by Pierre Schaeffer and the Groupe de Recherches Musicales. In 1950s and early-1960s Schaeffer, Pierre Henry, Olivier Messiaen, Pierre Boulez, Jean Barraqué, Karlheinz Stockhausen, Edgard Varèse, Iannis Xenakis, Michel Philippot, and Arthur Honegger all worked with sound collage. Examples are Étude I (1951) and Étude II (1951) by Boulez, Timbres-durées (1952) by Messiaen, Étude aux mille collants (1952) by Stockhausen, Le microphone bien tempéré (1952) and La voile d'Orphée (1953) by Henry, Étude I (1953) by Philippot, Étude (1953) by Barraqué, the mixed pieces Toute la lyre (1951) and Orphée 53 (1953) by Schaeffer/Henry, and the film score Masquerage (1952) by Schaeffer and Astrologie (1953) by Henry. In 1954 Varèse and Honegger created Déserts and La rivière endormie". John Cage created his influential collage piece Williams Mix in 1952. More recently, George Rochberg used collage in Contra Mortem et Tempus and Symphony No. 3. In the 1980s Minóy made many palimpsest-like multi-tracked soundscape compositions that used sound collage.

== Micromontage ==
Micromontage is the use of montage on the time scale of microsounds. Its primary proponent is composer Horacio Vaggione in works such as Octuor (1982), Thema (1985, Wergo 2026-2), and Schall (1995, Mnémosyne Musique Média LDC 278–1102). The technique may include the extraction and arrangement of sound particles from a sample or the creation and exact placement of each particle to create complex sound patterns or singular particles (transients). It may be accomplished through graphic editing, a script, or automated through a computer program. Granular synthesis incorporates many of the techniques of micromontage, though granular synthesis is inevitably automated while micromontage may be realized directly, point by point. "It therefore demands unusual patience" and may be compared to the pointillistic paintings of Georges Seurat.

== Popular music ==
Freak Out!, the 1966 debut album by the Mothers of Invention, made use of avant-garde sound collage, particularly the closing track "The Return of the Son of Monster Magnet". The Beatles incorporated sound collage on their 1968 self-titled double album (also known as the White Album) with the track "Revolution 9". Uncut wrote that Requia by John Fahey made use of meditative guitar soli with tape collage experimentation on "Requiem for Molly".

== See also ==
- Musique concrète
- Detournement
- Mashup
- Remix
- Revolution 9
- Sampling (music)
- WhoSampled
- Soundscape
- Fluxus
- Plunderphonics
- Category:Sound collage albums
- BBC Radiophonic Workshop
