= Harald Bode =

German engineer and electronic music developer

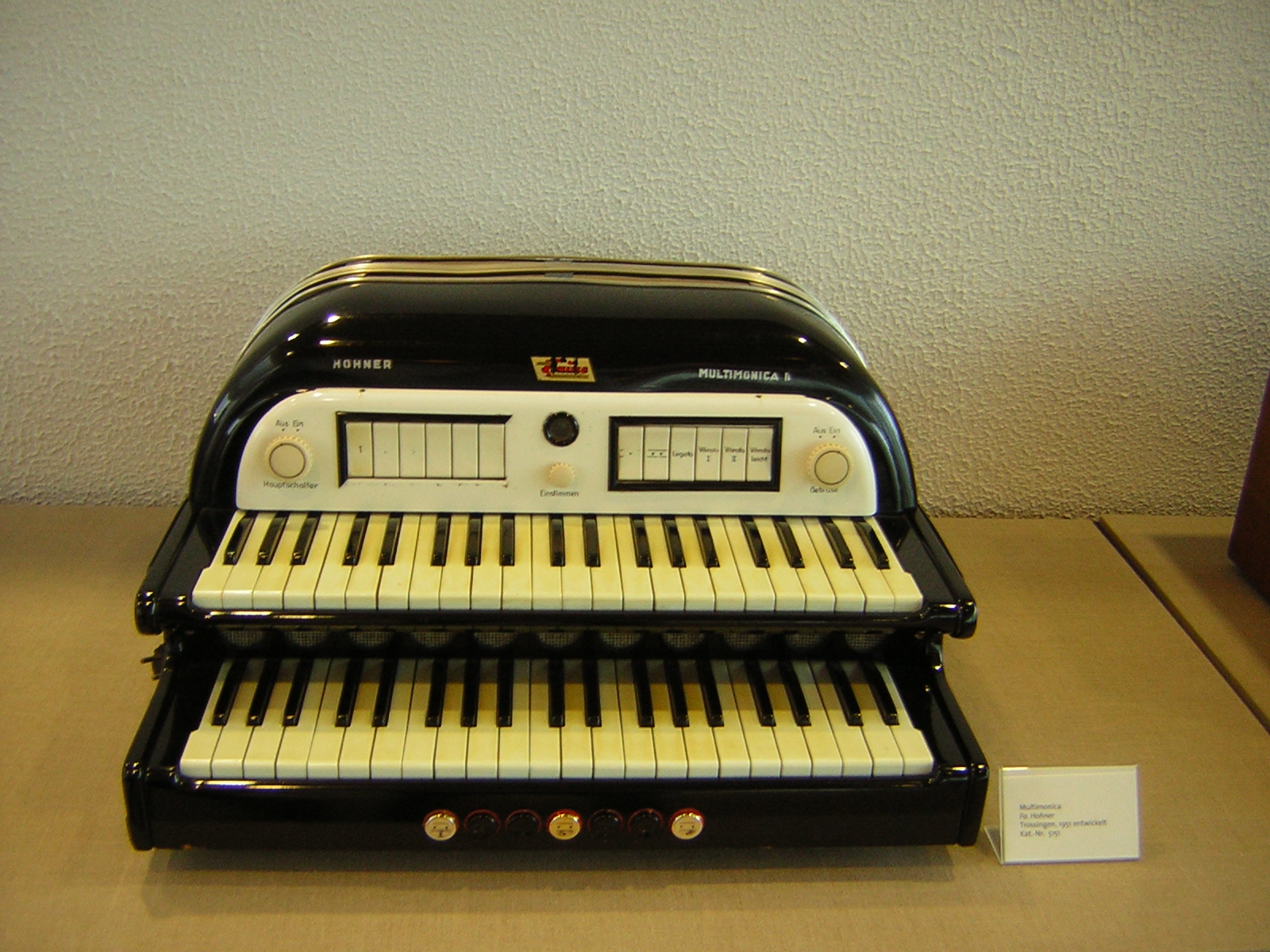
Hohner Multimonica, first released in 1940, designed by Harald Bode

Harald Bode (October 19, 1909 – January 15, 1987) was a German engineer and pioneer in the development of electronic musical instruments.

== Biography ==
Harald Bode was born in 1909 in Hamburg, Germany. At the age of 18 he lost his parents and started studying, and graduated from the University of Hamburg in 1934. In 1935, he began his pioneering work in the field of electronic musical instruments, and with funding support provided by Christian Warnke, his earliest work was completed in 1937.

The Warbo Formant Organ (1937), (Note: Rhea, Thomas L. (July 2011), "Harald Bode's Four-Voice Assignment Keyboard (1937)", EContact!, 13 (4) (reprint ed.), Canadian Electroacoustic Community (CEC); Originally published as Rhea, Tom, "Electronic Perspectives", Contemporary Keyboard (December 1979): 89) an archetype of today's polyphonic synthesizer, was a four voice key-assignment keyboard with two formant filters and dynamic envelope controller. Eventually it went into commercial production by a factory in Dachau, and it became one of the earliest polyphonic synthesizer products, along with Novachord (1939) by Hammond.

The Melochord (1947–1949), developed by Bode, was extensively used by Werner Meyer-Eppler in early days of the electronic studio at Bonn University. (Note: "The "Melochord" (1947–9)", The Keyboardmuseum Online, archived from the original on 2007-11-14 (description and history)) Then in 1953 a Melochord, along with Monochord by Friedrich Trautwein, was specially commissioned by the Studio for Electronic Music of the Westdeutscher Rundfunk (WDR Studio in Cologne), and used by the Elektronische Musik group throughout the 1950s. (see Melochord at the WDR Studio in Cologne)

From 1950, Bode designed electronic organs for the Apparatewerk Bayern (AWB) in Germany and the Estey Organ Company in the United States. In 1954, Bode immigrated to the United States as a chief engineer (later vice-president) of Estey Organ, and resumed his research at several companies and as a contractor of German companies.

In 1959–1960, Bode developed a modular synthesizer and sound processor, and in 1961, he wrote a paper exploring the advantages of newly emerging transistor technology over older vacuum tube devices; also he served as AES session chairman on music and electronic for the fall conventions in 1962 and 1964; after then, his ideas were adopted by Robert Moog, Donald Buchla and others.

After retiring from the chief engineer of Bell Aerospace in 1974, he composed TV-advertising spots and gave live concerts. Also in 1977, Bode was invited as a chief engineer of the Norlin/Moog Music after Robert Moog left.

He died in North Tonawanda in 1987. Bode's influence upon electronic music has persisted long after his death, with a number of 21st century musicians referencing or sampling his work.

His complete estate is preserved at the ZKM | Center for Art and Media Karlsruhe, where it is accessible for research.

== Accomplishments ==
Theory, circuits and devices to the sound production and sound figuration. Development and building of monophonic and polyphonic electronic organs/synthesizers and the sound processors:

- Warbo Formant Organ (1937) one of the first key-assignment polyphonic synthesizers with formant filters and dynamic envelope shaping, designed and built by Bode with the funding support provided by Christian Warnke. (Note: "Warbo" is acronym of Warnke-Bode)
- Melodium (1938) monophonic touch-sensitive synthesizer developed with Oskar Vierling, used in film scores and "light" music
- Multimonica (1940, Hohner) dual manual electronic/acoustic hybrid keyboard instrument, consists of monophonic sawtooth wave oscillator (upper) and air-driven reed harmonium (lower)
- Melochord (1947–1949) 37-key monophonic keyboard with dynamic envelope wave shaping, volume pedal controller, and transpose switches to cover seven octaves. Later a second keyboard was added to control the timbre.

For the Apparatewerk Bayern (AWB) in Germany, Estey Organ Company in Brattleboro, Vermont, USA, and others:

- Polychord (1950)
- Polychord III (c. 1951, Apparatewerk Bayern)
- Bode Organ (1951), later known as Estey Electronic Organ, based on Polychord III
- Cembaphon (1951), an electric harpsichord using electrostatic pickup
- Tuttivox (1953, Jörgensen Elektronic), under license by Jörgensen Elektronic in Düsseldorf, apparently the only one of this type built (a portable electronic organ based on vacuum tube technology) (Note: "The Tuttivox (1946)", 120 Years of Electronic Music, archived from the original on 2012-04-02 (Note: year in title may be incorrect)) (Note: Windler, Christian Oliver, Jörgensen Electronic Tuttivox (antique portable electron tube organ))
- Concert Clavioline (1953) 6-octave model (by transpose buttons) of Clavioline (1947) originally developed by Constant Martin. (portable monophonic synthesizer based on vacuum tubes) (Note: Bode (6 octave) Clavioline (photograph). Clavioline.com. Archived from the original on 2006-08-21. (photographs of Bode Clavioline and Bode Melochord with Harald Bode)) (Note: Windler, Christian Oliver, Jörgensen Electronic Clavioline (monophonic portable tube synth keyboard with great electro noises))
- Estey Electronic Organ model S and AS-1 (1954)

During his time as an executive of the Wurlitzer Organ Co.:

- A first transistor model of the Wurlitzer Electric Piano (1960)
- Modular Synthesizer / Sound Processor (1959–1960)
- Voltage-controlled oscillator (VCO) (1960)

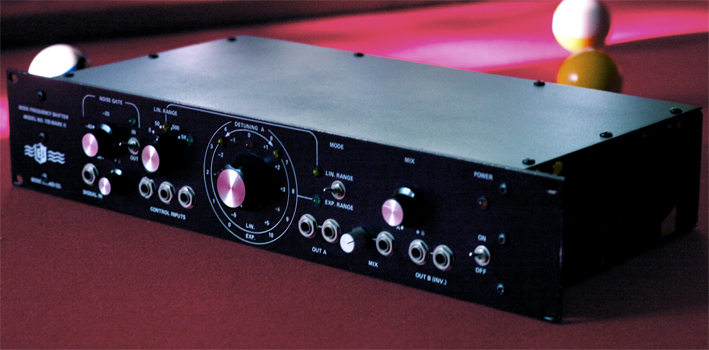
Frequency shifter, model 735 Mark III,
designed and manufactured by Bode

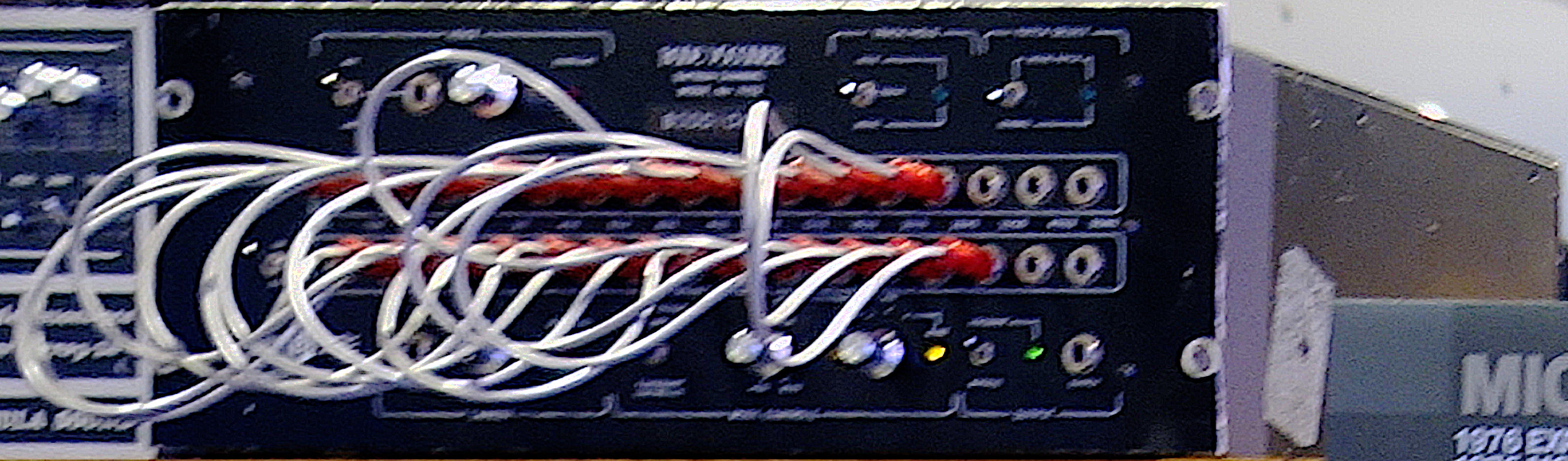
Vocoder, model 7702,
designed and manufactured by Bode

As the products of Bode Sound Company:

- Bode Ring Modulator (1964)
- Bode Frequency Shifter (1964)
- Bode Vocoder 7702 / Moog Vocoder (1977)
  - Note that above three products were also licensed to Moog Music as a part of the Moog Synthesizer.
- Bode Barberpole Phaser (1981)
- Bode Feedback Stabilizer (1982)

== Notable users ==
The Melochord at the WDR Studio in Cologne was used by:

- Werner Meyer-Eppler in his composition Klangmodelle (1951) and lectures at Darmstadt New Music Summer School,
- Herbert Eimert and Robert Beyer in their joint compositions Klangstudie I (1951) and Klangfiguren II (c.1951), and
- György Ligeti in his composition Glissandi (1957).

But in the case of Karlheinz Stockhausen, a student of Meyer-Eppler at the University of Bonn in 1954–1956, his only use of the melochord was in a failed experiment with a ring modulator. After this, he chose to disregard such instruments in favor of sine-wave generators, which he used in producing Studie I (1953) and Studie II (1954). This was also true for the two works by Karel Goeyvaerts produced there, and for Seismogramme (1954) by Henri Pousseur.

== Personal life ==
He was the father of cinematographer Ralf D. Bode, and video artist Peer Bode.
