= Multimonica =

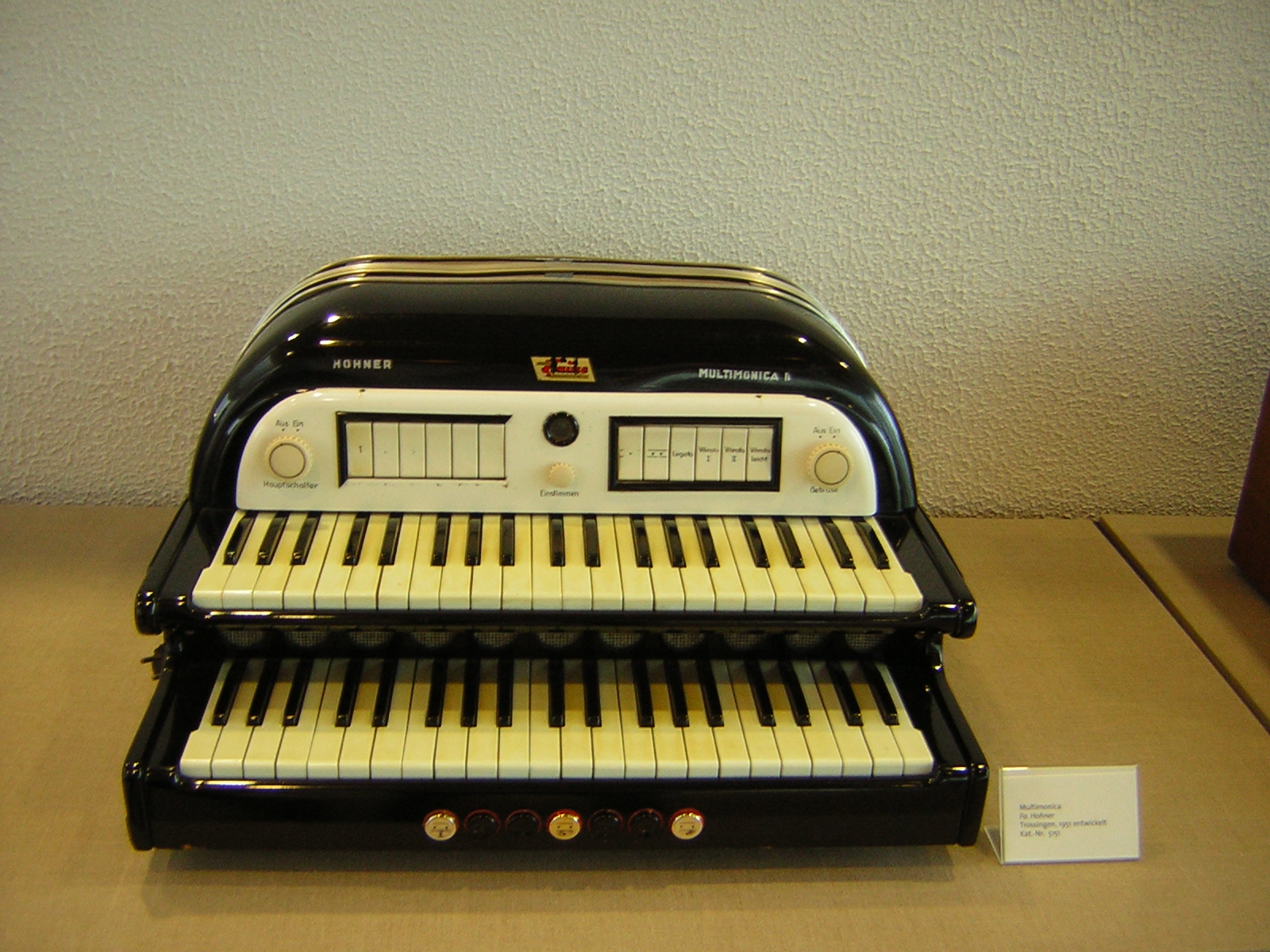
Multimonica II (manufactured in 1951)

The Hohner Multimonica (introduced in 1940) featured a combination of a fan-blown reed organ and a monophonic sawtooth wave analog synthesizer. Produced by the German Hohner GmbH in the 1940s and 1950s, it preceded even the more famous Selmer Clavioline. Its circuitry was designed by the German engineer Harald Bode.

There have been at least two series of Multimonica, with different control panel layout and schematics. The earlier models are now rare, since their production was halted by the outbreak of World War II, and many units may have been lost in the war. Multimonica II was released by the end of the ’40s.

The front panel controls of the Multimonica I from left to right are: gain knob for the microphone input; power switch and overall volume knob; synthesizer/amplifier selector; power switch for the blower fan; tuning knob; four selector switches for different harmonics filtering of the synthesizer sound; four selectors for the different loudspeakers; vibrato switch.

The Multimonica II featured no microphone input, and only one loudspeaker, but provided more types of harmonics filtering, and the electromechanic vibrato was changed to a tube based and more sophisticated design. The front panel controls of the Multimonica II from left to right are: power switch and overall volume knob; six selector switches for different preset sounds of the synthesizer; tuning knob; two selector switches for different harmonics filtering; three switches for the vibrato speed and amplitude; power switch for the blower fan.

The circuit is based on Philips 13204 X, Philips EL41, Telefunken EF41 tubes for Multimonica I, and EL41; ECC40; EF40 tubes for the second series.
A photo of a third model can be found on the World Wide Web, looking like a simplified version of Multimonica I (without microphone input).
