= Klavierstücke (Stockhausen) =

Series of compositions by Karlheinz Stockhausen

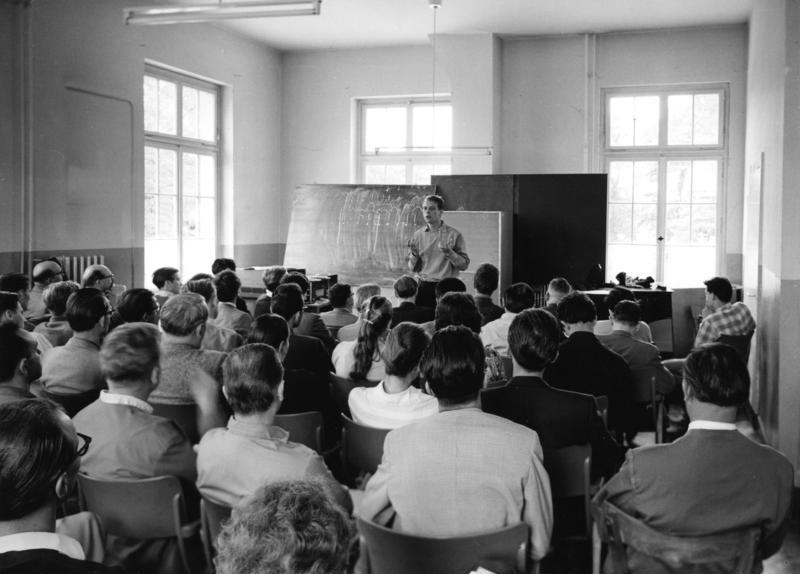
Karlheinz Stockhausen lecturing on Klavierstück XI at Darmstadt, July 1957

The Klavierstücke (German for "Piano Pieces") constitute a series of nineteen compositions by German composer Karlheinz Stockhausen.

Stockhausen has said the Klavierstücke "are my drawings". Originating as a set of four small pieces composed between February and June 1952, Stockhausen later formulated a plan for a large cycle of 21 Klavierstücke, in sets of 4 + 6 + 1 + 5 + 3 + 2 pieces. He composed the second set in 1954–55 (VI was subsequently revised several times and IX and X were finished only in 1961), and the single Klavierstück XI in 1956. Beginning in 1979, he resumed composing Klavierstücke and finished eight more, but appears to have abandoned the plan for a set of 21 pieces. The pieces from XV onward are for the synthesizer or similar electronic instruments, which Stockhausen had come to regard as the natural successor to the piano. The dimensions vary considerably, from a duration of less than half a minute for Klavierstück III to around half an hour for Klavierstücke VI, X, XIII, and XIX.

== Klavierstücke I–IV: from point to group composition ==
The first four Klavierstücke together mark a stage in Stockhausen's evolution from point music to group composition. They were composed in the order III–II–IV–I, the first two (originally titled simply A and B) in February 1952, and the remaining two before the end of June 1952. The set is dedicated to Marcelle Mercenier, the Belgian pianist who performed the world premiere in Darmstadt on 21 August 1954.

=== Klavierstück I ===
Klavierstück I, the last of the set to be composed, was written in just two days, after the composer had previously "merely prepared some measurements and relationships". Group composition is used throughout the piece, permeating its many layers: not only is each group distinguished by the number of notes, range, direction, etc., but even the timescales of successive measures form order-permutations of a series of 1–6 quarter notes. There are six of these series (and therefore 36 groups), and when the six series are arranged in a square:

Klavierstück I
5	2	3	1	4	6
3	4	2	5	6	1
2	6	4	3	1	5
4	1	6	2	5	3
6	5	1	4	3	2
1	3	5	6	2	4

it may be seen that, reading down each column, one always gets the sequence 1 5 3 2 4 6 or a rotation of it. Stockhausen later used one such rotation, 4 6 1 5 3 2, to determine the number of constituent pieces in each set for his planned cycle of 21 Klavierstücke. The important thing here, however, is that each of these duration units is filled out by one of the "sound forms" (or "modes") of the sort used in Klavierstück II and many of Stockhausen's other works from 1952 to 1954. The first group, for example, has notes entering successively to build up a chord, while the second bar has five successive units of silence + sound.

The pitches divide the chromatic total into two chromatic hexachords, C, C♯, D, D♯, E, F, and F♯, G, G♯, A, A♯, B. These two hexachords alternate regularly throughout the piece, but the internal order of the notes is freely permuted from one occurrence to the next.) The registral disposition of the pitches is organised independently, around two "bridge piers" located 1/3 and 2/3 of the way through the piece. The first alternates perfect fifths and tritones (with one note, G♯ displaced downward by two octaves); the second is an "all-interval" chord, a verticalisation of the all-interval "wedge" series which Stockhausen used repeatedly in works from 1956 to the mid-1960s.

The notation Stockhausen used for Klavierstück I attracted much criticism when the piece first appeared, notably from Boulez, and prompted several suggestions for how the player might deal with the complex, nested irrational rhythms. Leonard Stein's suggestion that the outermost layer of proportion numbers could be replaced by changing metronome values, calculated from the fastest speed possible for the smallest note-values, was later incorporated into the published score as a footnote, but has been dismissed by one writer as "superfluous" and "a mistake", holding that "the piece is playable in its own terms" by any pianist who can play Chopin, Liszt, or Beethoven.

=== Klavierstück II ===
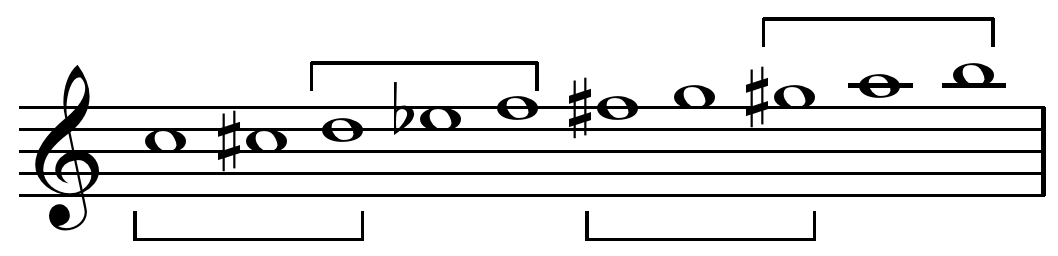
"Rudiments of the 12-note series" from Stockhausen's Klavierstück II

The pitch content of Klavierstück II consists of rotations of two groups of five pitches. According to one writer, the piece is a study in vertical note groups treated as electronic tone mixtures, though Stockhausen composed it ten months before his first practical experience in an electronic studio. It consists of thirty groups, each of one bar, ranging in length from 1/8 to 5/8 and grouped in five multiples ranging from 4 to 8: 4 × 1/8, 5 × 2/8, 6 × 4/8, 7 × 5/8, 8 × 3/8. These groups are further organized using a set of characteristic shapes or "sound forms", also called "modes", which Stockhausen acknowledged to have come from Messiaen's concept of "neumes". Their exact nature and disposition, however, are a matter of debate. Register composition is often important in Stockhausen's works, but the only attempt to demonstrate a systematic treatment of registers in Klavierstück II has been only tentative.

=== Klavierstück III ===
Klavierstück III, the smallest of the cycle and the shortest of all Stockhausen's compositions, has been compared by Rudolph Stephan to a German lied: the (unspecified) tone-row is used in such a way that some notes appear only twice, others three times, four, etc.; the formal concept is that of a continuous expansion. Other writers have held that such appeals to traditional formal procedures are inappropriate, and find Stephan's analysis "helpless in the face of the true significance of the work". Rhythmically, according to one analysis, the piece consists of variants and superpositions of the initial sequence of six values, expressed as two groups of three (long-short-short and short-long-medium)—a possible but surprising early reaction to Olivier Messiaen's rhythmic cell method, whereas Klavierstück II introduces non-retrogradable (i.e., symmetrical) rhythmic patterns, also used by Messiaen. According to another analysis, it is the pattern of the first five notes, and thus a proportioned time structure based on fives runs through the entire piece.

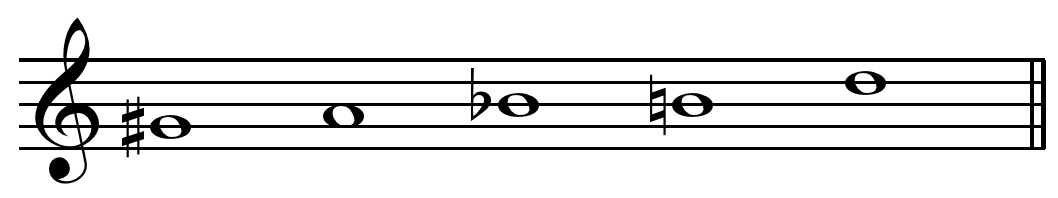
"Rudiments of the 12-note series" from Stockhausen's Klavierstück III

Analyses of the pitch material have fallen broadly into two camps. One, initiated by Robin Maconie, holds that the piece is constructed from chromatic tetrachords; the other, founded by Dieter Schnebel and continued by Jonathan Harvey, maintains that the basis is actually a five-note set, consisting of that same tetrachord plus a note a minor third above (0,1,2,3,6), and ordered as a series: A, B, D, A♭, B♭, in a "succession of 5 proportions [that] runs subcutaneously through the whole piece". In a passing reference to this piece, the Dutch composer Ton de Leeuw presents these same five notes in ascending scale order, which he describes as "rudiments of the 12-note series", but does not explain whether his diagram is to be understood as an ordered row or an unordered collection. This same set, treated as unordered, has been taken as a starting point for a lengthy analysis by David Lewin, while Christoph von Blumröder has published one nearly as long favouring Maconie's view. One reviewer has judged Blumröder's analysis as a conclusive demonstration that the tetrachord is in fact the compositional basis, while conceding that Harvey and Lewin's view remains a valid construal of the piece viewed as a finished product.

=== Klavierstück IV ===
The composer specifically cited Klavierstück IV as an example of point music. Nevertheless, its "note points" are collected into groups and layers by means of some features that remain constant (e.g., a constant dynamic or direction of motion), resulting in a fusion of "punctual" constellations and "group forms", characteristic of all four pieces in this set.

This piece is written in strictly linear two-part counterpoint, and features progressive shortening of fundamental durations by serial fractions. Each note is either followed or preceded by a rest, and so the termination of a note can serve as a reference to a point in time (as an alternative to the beginning of the note playing the same role). The identities of the two contrapuntal strands are achieved not through register or pitch material, but solely through dynamics: one line is loud (predominantly ff), and the other soft (predominantly pp). However, these distinct dynamic categories are eroded over the course of the piece by the increasing addition of intermediate dynamic values. Pierre Boulez was an early admirer of the piece: he praised it in a 1953 article written for Pierre Schaeffer, and sent John Cage a copy of the ending.

One writer believes the pitch structure is built from the opening trichord of the piece, D♭, C, F. Two others on the contrary describe it as a succession of chromatic aggregates, organized primarily by registral position. This starts from fixing the notes in a perfectly regular pattern of minor ninths, "wrapping around" from the extreme high to the extreme low register (or low to high, depending on the direction taken) as the upper (or lower) limit of the keyboard is reached (twice), so as to create an unbroken cycle. In the ascending direction: C_{6}, D♭_{7}, D_{1}, E♭_{2}, E_{3}, F_{4}, F♯_{5}, G_{6}, A♭_{7}, A_{1}, B♭_{2}, B_{3}. From this starting disposition, progressive changing of note registers somehow plays a role in shaping the subsequent course of the piece.

== Klavierstücke V–X: variable form ==
The second set of Klavierstücke was begun late in 1953 or at the end of January 1954, while Stockhausen was in the midst of work on his Second Electronic Study. His decision to again compose for conventional instruments was prompted chiefly by a renewed interest in unmeasurable, "irrational" factors in instrumental music. These were expressed by such things as modes of attack involving complex physical actions, or the interplay of metrical time with durations determined subjectively, by physical actions notated as grace notes, to be played "as fast as possible". Stockhausen's collective term for these kinds of subjective elements is "variable form".

The first four pieces of this second set, V–VIII, originally conceived to be of about the same size as pieces I–IV, were composed fairly rapidly, during 1954. Having gotten this far, however, Stockhausen seems to have found them unsatisfactory for two reasons: (1) they were all quite short, and (2) they were too one-dimensional, each concentrating too obviously on one particular compositional problem. Klavierstück V was considerably lengthened from its original conception, and the original pieces VI and VII were discarded and replaced by new, much larger pieces. Though planned at the same time, numbers IX and X were not actually composed until 1961, by which time their conception had completely changed, and the set was only published in 1963, by which time Klavierstück VI had undergone several further substantial revisions. Over the course of this second set, it becomes increasingly easier to perceive the overall, as opposed to local, structure, as the basic types of material become more highly differentiated and are isolated from each other by increasingly significant use of silence.

The original plan for these six pieces, drafted early in 1954, is based on the following number square:

Klavierstücke V–X (matrix)
2	6	1	4	3	5
6	4	5	2	1	3
1	5	6	3	2	4
4	2	3	6	5	1
3	1	2	5	4	6
5	3	4	1	6	2

The first row is an all-interval series, and the remaining rows are transpositions of the first onto each of its members. One basic idea for this set is that each piece should have a different number of main sections (from 1 one to 6), each identified by a different tempo. Stockhausen arrives at the number of main sections (or "tempo groups") for each piece from the second line of the basic square, thus 6 sections for Klavierstück V, 4 for Klavierstück VI, etc. The rows of square 1 starting from the beginning are then used to determine the number of subsections in each tempo group, so the six tempo groups in Klavierstück V are subdivided into 2, 6, 1, 4, 3, and 5 subgroups, Klavierstück VI into 6, 4, 5, and 2 subgroups, etc. Another five squares are derived from this first one, by starting with its second, third, etc. lines. These six squares "furnish a sufficiently large number of proportions for all the pieces in the cycle, but apart from determining the tempo groups and main subdivisions, they do very little to precondition the actual content of each piece, or indeed the number of features to which the squares are applied".

All six pieces were originally to have been dedicated to David Tudor, but this was later changed so that Tudor retains the dedication in the published scores of V–VIII, while IX and X are dedicated to Aloys Kontarsky. Klavierstuck V was premiered by Marcelle Mercenier on 21 August 1954 in Darmstadt, together with the premieres of the Klavierstücke I–IV. She also premiered Klavierstücke VI–VIII in Darmstadt, on 1 June 1955.

=== Klavierstück V ===
Klavierstück V was originally a study concentrating on flamboyantly spaced groups of grace notes centred around long "central tones". Stockhausen drastically revised and expanded this early version, bringing the grace-note groups into less extreme registers, then using the result as a background for an entirely new set of superimposed figurations based on series quite unrelated to the original material. This final version was premiered in Darmstadt by Marcelle Mercenier, together with the Klavierstücke I–IV, on 21 August 1954. The piece is in six sections, each in a different tempo, with the fastest tempos in the middle and the slowest at the end. Each section is made up of several groups, of great variety and distinctiveness, ranging from a single, short note near the end of the sixth section to a group of forty-seven notes in the third section. In the context of this piece, a "group" is a sustained central note with grace notes before, with/around, or after it. These three possibilities are doubled to six by the use or non-use of the pedal. Stockhausen described the particular character of the groups in Klavierstück V:

a central pitch will sometimes be attacked with a very rapid group of little satellites around it, sustained with the pedal as a coloration of this central pitch, like moons around planets and planets around a sun. A specific color tints such a "head"—or core—of a sound structure, by means of the intervals of the notes which ring together.

This piece has been described as "the 1950s counterpart of a Chopin nocturne, elegant and crystalline".

=== Klavierstück VI ===
Klavierstück VI exists in four versions: (a) a piece not much longer than Klavierstück III, composed probably in May 1954, and discarded entirely; (b) a first "full-length" version, drafted by 12 November and finished on 3 December, with a fair copy completed on 10 December 1954; (c) a complete reworking of version b, probably completed by March 1955 (the version recorded a few years later by David Tudor); (d) the final, published version, which adds a great deal of new material, dating from 1960 or 1961.

The first, discarded version of Klavierstück VI used symmetrical, fixed-register chords together with groups of grace-note chords around measured groups of single notes. The symmetrical pitch structure was probably modelled on the interlocking chords at the beginning of Anton Webern's Symphony, but the narrow, claustrophobic high register of the piano piece and its "spasmodic, twitching rhythms" combine to give it a character suitable only for a short piece.

On 5 December 1954, shortly after completing the second version, Stockhausen wrote to his friend Henri Pousseur, expressing great satisfaction with his new piece, which had taken three months and now came to fourteen pages, and to Karel Goeyvaerts he wrote "It's pure, but alive". By January 1955, however, he had decided the harmony was not "clean" enough, and completely rewrote the piece again.)

A notational innovation introduced in the final version of this piece is the graphical indication of tempo changes on a 13-line staff. A rising line indicates accelerando, a descending line represents ritardando, and the line vanishes altogether when there is a rest. This notation is more precise than the traditional indications.

=== Klavierstück VII ===
Klavierstück VII was originally composed as an attempt to re-integrate periodic rhythms into serial structures, and in this form was completed on 3 August 1954. The process of composition already had entailed a number of revisions, and Stockhausen finally abandoned this version, evidently in part because of the drastic reduction in rhythmic subtlety, but also because of persistent difficulties in avoiding strong tonal implications caused by the chosen serial conception of the pitch structure. The resulting Webern-cum-Messiaen harmony possesses a hothouse beauty recalling the heady, decadent world of Wagner's Tristan and Duparc's L'extase, but was stylistically so out of place with the other Klavierstücke that it is easy to understand why Stockhausen abandoned it. Between March and May 1955, Stockhausen composed an entirely different piece, which is the published version of Klavierstück VII.

Like the original, discarded piece, the new version is divided into five tempo-defined sections (MM 40, 63.5, 57, 71, 50.5). The most striking feature of Klavierstück VII is the establishment of resonances by silently depressed keys, which are then set into vibration by accented single notes. At the beginning, a prominent C♯ recurs several times, coloured each time with a different resonance. Although note is counterbalanced by a group of grace notes preceding its next entry, and by other tones, the opening few bars "tend to group around this unassailable centre". This is achieved by silently depressed keys and by use of the middle pedal, in order to release the dampers so that certain notes may be set into sympathetic vibration by striking other notes. In this way many different timbres can be created for the same pitch. Over the course of the piece, a series of pitches treated in this way follows the C♯, with irregular, unpredictable durations and intervals of entry, and each time with a different colouring. The repetitions of these central notes makes them particularly obvious.

=== Klavierstück VIII ===
Klavierstück VIII is the only piece in this set of six that adheres closely to the original plan. It consists of two tempo groups (tempo no. 6, = 80, and tempo no. 5, = 90), the first subdivided into three parts, the second into two parts. Numerical series drawn from the six basic 6 × 6 number squares are used to govern more than a dozen other dimensions of the work, including number of subordinate groups, number of notes per group, intervals of entry (both range and distribution), absolute durations of notes, dynamic level, dynamic envelope, grace-note clusters (number of attacks, vertical density per attack, position relative to the main notes), and a number of further specifications for the main notes.

=== Klavierstück IX ===
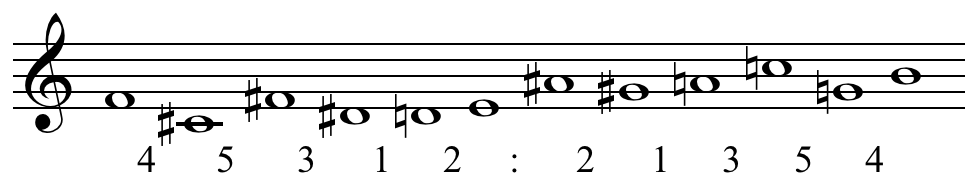
Tone row from Klavierstück IX (also found in Klavierstück VII and the beginning of Klavierstück X), the second half the retrograde at the tritone of the first half. See tone row for Gruppen.

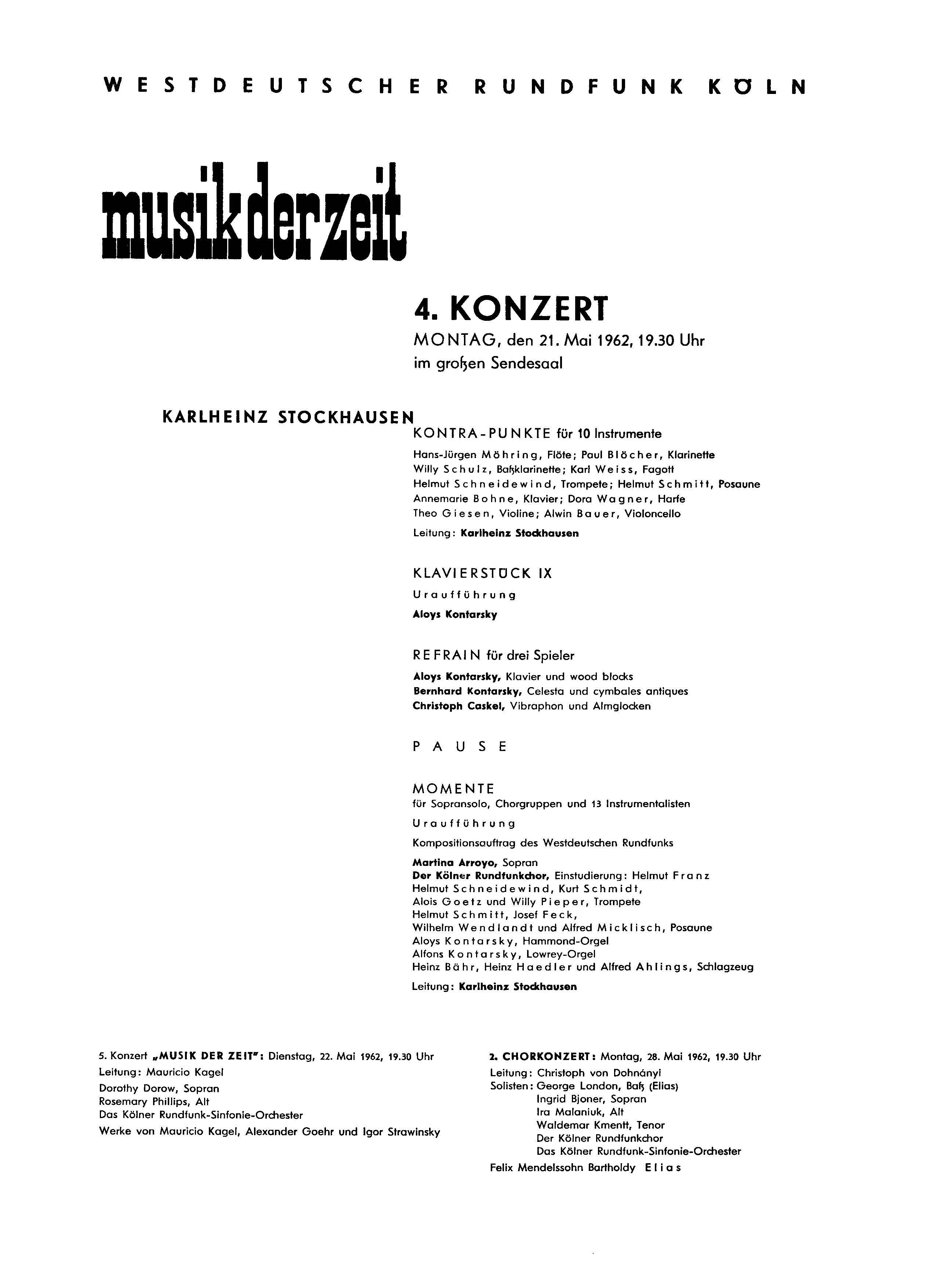
Programme for the world premiere of Klavierstück IX

Klavierstück IX presents two strongly contrasted ideas, an incessantly repeated four-note chord at a moderately fast speed in periodic rhythms, and a slowly rising chromatic scale with each note of a different duration. These ideas are alternated and juxtaposed, and finally resolved in the appearance of a new texture of irregularly spaced fast periodic groups in the upper register. Stockhausen deliberately exploits the impossibility of playing all four tones of the repeated chords at exactly the same time and intensity (another example of "variable form"), so that the tones constantly and involuntarily shift in prominence. Aloys Kontarsky's touch was so even that Stockhausen had to ask him purposefully to help this fortuitousness along, in order to "dissect" the chord. The idea of this repeated-chord variability was inspired by an improvisation Mary Bauermeister made on the piano in Doris's and Karlheinz's apartment in Cologne-Braunsfeld when, probably with non-European music in mind, she repeated a single chord on the piano, varying finger-pressure slightly on the individual chord tones from one repetition to the next to produce a kind of micro-melody. The rhythmic proportions throughout this piece are governed by the Fibonacci series, used both directly (1, 2, 3, 5, 8, 13, 21, etc.) and by the addition of increasingly larger values into a superordinated scale: 1, 1 + 2 = 3, 1 + 2 + 3 = 6, 1 + 2 + 3 + 5 = 11, etc., producing 1, 3, 6, 11, 19, 32, 53, etc.

Klavierstück IX was premiered by Aloys Kontarsky on 21 May 1962 in a Musik der Zeit concert at the WDR studios in Cologne.

=== Klavierstück X ===
The aural character of the tenth Klavierstück is dominated by the use of tone clusters, which occur in a variety of sizes as well as in cluster glissandos, which are the most important aspect of the work's unique sonic flavour. The performance of them requires the performer to wear gloves with the fingers cut away.

In Klavierstück X, Stockhausen composed structures in series of varying degrees of order and disorder, where greater order is connected with lower density and a higher isolation of events. Over the course of the piece, there is a process of mediation between disorder and order. From a uniform initial state of great disorder, there emerges an increasing number of ever more concentrated figures. By the end, the figures become unified into a higher supraordinate Gestalt.

Stockhausen abandoned the original plan for this piece, which prescribed three large sections, and replaced it with a new plan based on scales of seven elements. A basic series beginning with the strongest contrasts and progressing toward the central value was chosen: 7 1 3 2 5 6 4. The overall form is produced from this series in a complex way, resulting in a seven-phase form, to which Stockhausen added an eighth, preliminary section which compresses the seven main phases into a single one.

There are at least thirteen separate dimensions organised into seven-degree scales:

1. "characters" of chords (1–7 notes)
2. characters of clusters (3, 6, 10, 15, 21, 28, or 36 notes per cluster)
3. global (or "basis") durations (1, 2, 4, 8, 16, 32, 64 units)
4. action/rest durations
5. note values dividing the action durations (1 to 7 divisions)
6. attack densities (a two-dimensional scale, or 7 × 7 matrix)
7. degrees of order/disorder
8. dynamics (ppp, pp, p, mf, f, ff, fff)
9. range (bandwidth)
10. forms of motion
11. sound-characteristic (chained clusters, repetitions, arpeggio, etc.)
12. rests
13. shaping sound by pedalling

Pitches are the only thing not organised in sevens. Rather, they are in sixes, built from transposed permutations of the chromatic hexachord, organized according to one particular ordering of that hexachord, A F A♯ G F♯ G♯, which is the first half of the twelve-tone row used in Klavierstücke VII and IX, as well as in Gruppen.

Klavierstück X was commissioned by Radio Bremen, and was intended to have been premiered by David Tudor at their Pro Musica Nova festival in May 1961. However, the score was not finished in time for Tudor to learn it, and subsequently his international touring did not leave him in a position to do so. Consequently, the piece was finally premiered by Frederic Rzewski on 10 October 1962, during the third Settimana Internazionale Nuova Musica in Palermo. In the concurrent composition competition, the Concorso Internazionale SIMC 1962, the piece won only second prize. Rzewski also played the German premiere in Munich on 20 March 1963, and made the first radio recordings, for Radio Bremen on 2 December 1963 and for WDR on 16 January 1964. On 22 December 1964 Rzewski made the first recording for commercial release, in the Ariola sound studios in Berlin.

== Klavierstück XI: polyvalent structure ==
Klavierstück XI is famous for its mobile, or polyvalent structure. The mobile structure and graphic layout of the piece resembles that of Morton Feldman's Intermission 6 for 1 or 2 pianos of 1953, in which 15 fragments are distributed on a single page of music with the instruction: "Composition begins with any sound and proceeds to any other". In the same year, Earle Brown had composed Twenty-five Pages for 1–25 pianists, in which the pages are to be arranged in a sequence chosen by the performer(s), and each page may be performed either side up and events within each two-line system may be read as either treble or bass clef. When David Tudor, who at the time was preparing a version of Feldman's piece, was in Cologne in 1955, Stockhausen asked him,

"What if I wrote a piece where you could decide where you wanted to go on the page?" I said I knew someone who was already doing one, and he said, "In that case I shall not compose it". So I retracted, and said it was just an idea my friend was thinking about, and told him he mustn't consider any other composer but should go ahead and do it anyway, and that led to Klavierstück No 11.

Apart from the layout on the page, Feldman's piece has nothing in common with Stockhausen's composition. Rather than rhythmic cells, its components are single tones and chords, with no rhythmic or dynamic indications.

Klavierstück XI consists of 17 fragments spread over a single, large page. The performer may begin with any fragment, and continue to any other, proceeding through the labyrinth until a fragment has been reached for the third time, when the performance ends. Markings for tempo, dynamics, etc. at the end of each fragment are to be applied to the next fragment. Though composed with a complex serial plan, the pitches have nothing to do with twelve-tone technique but instead are derived from the proportions of the previously composed rhythms.

The durations are founded on a set of matrices all of which have six rows, but with numbers of columns varying from two to seven. These matrices "amount to sets of two-dimensional 'scales'". The first row of each of these rhythm matrices consists of a sequence of simple arithmetic duration values: two columns of + , three columns of + + . , four columns of + + . + , etc., up to seven columns; each successive row after the first consists of increasingly finer, irregular subdivisions of that value. These "two-dimensional scales" are then permuted systematically (Truelove 1998, 190, 202–204), and the six resulting, increasingly larger matrices were combined to form the columns of a new, complex Final Rhythm Matrix of six columns and six rows. Stockhausen then selected nineteen out of the thirty-six available rhythmic structures to compose out into the fragments of Klavierstück XI:

Selection of fragments for Klavierstück XI
	#5		#11		#17
	#6	#8			#18
#1		#9	#12		x
#2			#13	#14	
#3		#10		#15	
#4	#7			#16	#19

Stockhausen's design appears to have been to select an equal number of fragments from each row (degree of complexity of subdivision) and each column (overall duration of the fragment), except for the first column (shortest duration) and last row (most complex subdivision). This is suggested by the fact that he originally selected column 6, row 3 for the last fragment (marked with an x in the illustration), then changed his mind in favor of the lower-right cell. When writing out the fragments, Stockhausen doubled the note values from the ones in the matrix, so that, in the score, fragments 1–4, 5–7, 8–10, 11–13, 14–16, and 17–19 have overall durations of 3, 6, 10, 15, 21, and 28 quarter notes, respectively. Within each of these groups there is a "main text" of melody or chords. Interspersed into these are groups of grace-note chords and clusters, as well as tremolos, trills, and harmonics, and these two levels are constructed independently.

One of the earliest analysts of this piece, Konrad Boehmer, observed the distinct sets of group durations but, apparently not having seen the sketches, established a different taxonomy (and made a mistake counting the duration of one group). Since Boehmer's labels have been used by a number of later writers, the correspondence with the numeration from the sketches may be useful:

Sketches	Boehmer
1	A1
2	A2
3	A4
4	A3
5	B2
6	B1
7	B3
8	C1
9	C3
10	C2
11	D1
12	D4
13	D2
14	E2
15	E1
16	D3
17	F3
18	F1
19	F2

The nineteen fragments are then distributed over the single, large page of the score in such a way as to minimize any possible influence on spontaneity of choice and promote statistical equality

Klavierstück XI is dedicated to David Tudor, who gave the world premiere of Klavierstück XI on 22 April 1957 in New York, in two very different versions. Because of a misunderstanding, Stockhausen had promised the world premiere to Wolfgang Steinecke for the Darmstädter Ferienkurse in July, with Tudor as the pianist. When Luigi Nono informed him of Tudor's New York performance, Steinecke was furious. Tudor wrote to apologise, and Steinecke accepted that he would have to settle for the European premiere, but then Tudor planned to play the piece in Paris two weeks before Darmstadt. However, Tudor fell seriously ill early in July and had to cancel his European tour, and so the European premiere took place on 28 July 1957, the last day of the courses, in the Darmstadt orangerie, in two different versions played by the pianist Paul Jacobs and billed in the programme book as the world premiere.

== Unrealised plans ==
In 1958–59 Stockhausen planned a fourth set, Klavierstücke XII–XVI, which were to have incorporated many kinds of variable forms, involving a number of innovative notational devices. However, this set never got beyond the planning stages.

== Klavierstücke XII–XIX: formula composition and Licht ==
The pieces from XII to XIX are all associated with the opera cycle Licht (1977–2003), and appear not to continue the original organizational plan. Although Klavierstück XIX was to have ended the fifth set, there is no apparent 5 + 3 grouping, which would result in a separation between Klavierstücke XVI and XVII, both of which are associated with the same opera and are similar in character. There is, however, a distinction between the three Klavierstücke XII–XIV and the five remaining ones, in that the former are (like their predecessors) for piano, whereas the latter are principally for keyboard synthesizer(s).

All of the material of the Licht cycle is made from three melodic strands, each called a "formula" by Stockhausen, and each identified with one of the three archetypal protagonists of Licht: Michael, Eve, and Lucifer. In addition to a basic melody (the "nuclear" version of the formula), each line is also interrupted at intervals by inserted ornamental figurations, including soft noises called "coloured silences". These strands are superimposed to form a contrapuntal web which Stockhausen calls the "superformula". The superformula is used at all levels of the composition, from the background structure of the entire cycle down to the details of individual scenes. The structure and character of the Klavierstücke derived from the Licht operas are therefore dependent on the particular configuration of the segments to which they correspond.

The first three of these pieces are drawn from scenes in which the piano is dominant in the opera.

=== Klavierstück XII ===
Klavierstück XII is in three large sections, corresponding to the three "Examinations" in act 1, scene 3 of Donnerstag aus Licht (1979), from which the piano piece was adapted in 1983. This scene is formed according to the second note of Michael's "Thursday" segment of the Licht superformula, an E divided into three parts: dotted-sixteenth, thirty-second, and eighth. This rhythm governs the durations of the scene's three "examinations" and, therefore, of the Klavierstück as well (3:1:4). The three superimposed polyphonic melodies ("formulas") of the superformula are registrally rotated in these three statements, so that the Eve formula is highest for the first section, the Lucifer formula is highest for the second, and the Michael formula is uppermost for the third. This corresponds to the dramaturgy, as Michael recounts to the examining Jury his life on earth from the successive points of view of his mother, representing Eve, his father, representing Lucifer, and himself. The upper line in each case is also the most richly ornamented of the three. Each melody begins with a different characteristic interval followed by a semitone in the opposite direction, and this three-note figure continues to predominate in each section: rising major third and falling minor second, rising major seventh (the first note is repeated several times) and falling minor second, and finally a falling perfect fourth and rising minor seventh.

In the opera, Michael is portrayed in the first examination by the tenor singer, in the second by the trumpet (with additional accompaniment of basset-horn), and in the third by a dancer. He is accompanied throughout the scene by a pianist. The surface is created primarily from the "ornaments" and "improvisations" of the superformula. In the version for piano solo, the tenor, trumpet, and basset-horn material is either incorporated into the piano texture, or is hummed, whistled, or spoken by the pianist, adding to the polyphonic layers played on the keyboard. The vocal noises, as well as sweeping glissandi and individual plucked notes made directly on the piano strings, come directly from the superformula and constitute what Stockhausen calls "coloured silences"—that is, rests that are "enlivened" by brief accented notes or gliding noises. The clear melodic segments and coloured silences are juxtaposed and combined to form intermediate forms in Klavierstück XII. Because of the proportioning series of the three sections, the middle one is the shortest and most animated, while the last is the slowest and longest of the three.

Klavierstück XII is dedicated to the composer's daughter, Majella Stockhausen, who premiered the work at the Vernier Spring festival, on 9 June 1983, in Vernier, Switzerland.

=== Klavierstück XIII ===
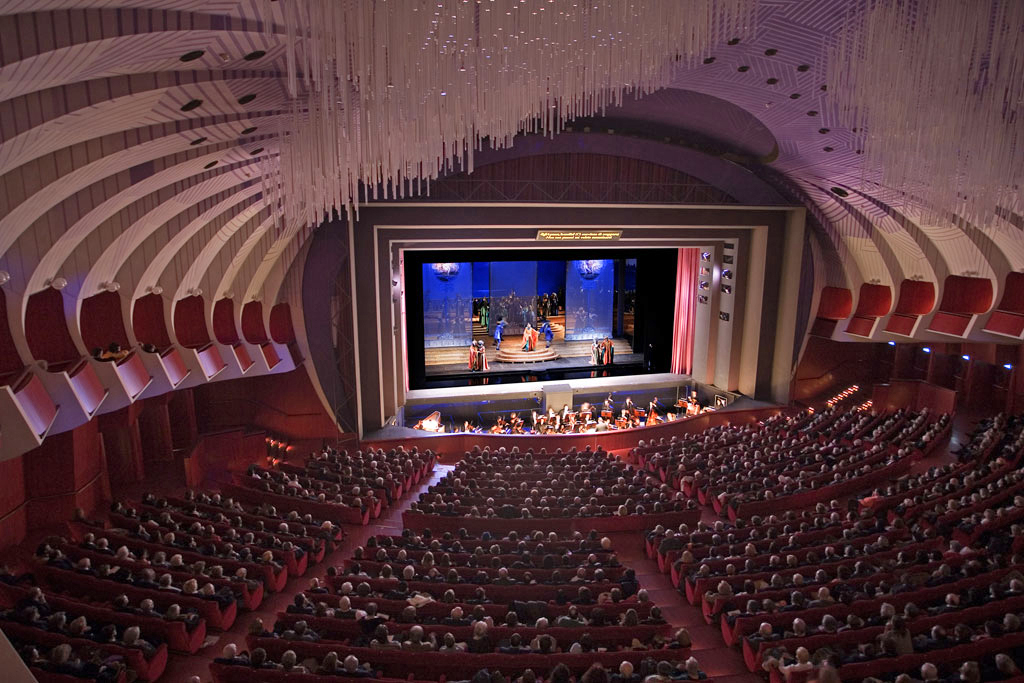
The Teatro Regio in Turin, where Klavierstück XIII was premiered

Klavierstück XIII (1981) was originally composed as a piano piece and, with the addition of a bass singer, became scene 1 ("Luzifers Traum") of Samstag aus Licht. The work was written for the composer's daughter Majella, and the solo piano version was premiered by her on 10 June 1982 in the Teatro Regio in Turin.

The key components of this piece are sounded at the very start: one upward-leaping major seventh in the lowest register, the same interval as a simultaneity in the middle register, and a single very high note establish five tonal layers within which the whole composition unfolds. These five contrapuntal layers are developed from the three-layer Licht superformula in three steps. First, the three layers of the sixth, "Saturday" segment (bars 14–16) are extracted for the background structure of the opera Samstag aus Licht. Second, a fourth layer, consisting of complete statement of the "nuclear" form of the Lucifer formula—the eleven pitches of the Lucifer formula, with the basic durations but without rhythmic subdivisions or the seven Akzidenzen inserted between the main segments ("scale", "improvisation", "echo", "coloured silences", etc.)—compressed to the duration of the Saturday segment, is superimposed in the extreme low register. Third, for the opening portion, corresponding to just the first scene of the opera, a fifth layer is added. This consists of the full Lucifer formula, with all of its insertions and embellishments, compressed still further to fit the length of this scene, and is placed in the middle register.

The rhythms of the five layers divide the total duration of the piece (27.04 minutes, in theory) into subdivisions of 1, 5, 8, 24, and 60 equal parts. Of these five divisions, the dominating one is the rising quintuplet in the Lucifer layer of the most-background layer, each note of which (G♯, A, A♯, B, and C) becomes the starting pitch of a complete Lucifer formula, composed out to a duration of one-fifth of the piece's total duration. The density of rhythmic activity in these formulas is progressively increased by dividing the notes in each of the five sections by the first five members of the Fibonacci series: 1, 2, 3, 5, and 8; that is, in the first section the notes appear in their original form, in section two each is divided in half, in section three into triplets, and so on. Finally, a process of "extreme compressions which begin to destroy the form to the point of its no longer being perceptible so as to bring about silence and motionless sound" is imposed over the course of the work. "The formula (whose skeleton is present in the first section) is established, and then all of its elements are increasingly compressed until non-perceptibility is attained so as to engender (through compression) stillness, coloured silence, nothingness, and emptiness". This is accomplished through a serial permutation scheme of compressions (Stauchungen), stretchings (Dehnungen), and rests, designed to achieve maximal dispersion of the erosions so as to avoid progressive modification of the same elements each time around. This gradual process, supported by the steady rise in pitch from one section to the next of the Lucifer formula, is paralleled by the descent from the upper register of the Eve formula, characterised by intervals of thirds. A third melody (the Michael formula) remains in the highest register throughout, and is exempted from the distorting process. Shortly before the end of the piece, the Lucifer and Eve formulas converge. At this point, the Eve melody asserts itself and, the formal process now completed, the music fades away and the piano lid is lowered.

The premiere of the solo-piano version of Klavierstück XIII was given on 10 June 1982 at the Teatro Regio in Turin by Majella Stockhausen. The piece is dedicated to her, on the occasion of her twentieth birthday.

=== Klavierstück XIV ===
Klavierstück XIV, also called Geburtstags-Formel (Birthday Formula), was composed from 7–8 August 1984 in Kürten as a 60th-birthday gift for Pierre Boulez, to whom the score is dedicated. The premiere was played by Pierre-Laurent Aimard in a birthday concert for Boulez on 31 March 1985 in Baden-Baden. With the addition in 1987 of a part for girls' choir, it became act 2, scene 2 of Montag aus Licht.

Two months before composing this first component part of Montag aus Licht, Stockhausen said:

I have had the feeling for some time that Monday will be very different—very new for me too, because I have the feeling Monday is the reverse, because it's the birth. So it's the reverse of everything that I have done up to now. Most probably all the formulas will be upside-down, will be mirrored: like The Woman is in respect to the men. I think all the structural material all of a sudden is going to change drastically in the detail.

Just twenty bars long and lasting only about 6 minutes in performance, Klavierstück XIV is a much shorter piece than its two immediate predecessors, consisting essentially of a single, simple statement of the Licht superformula. In comparison with the three-part structure of Klavierstück XII and the five-part division of Klavierstück XIII, however, this piece falls into the seven sections of the superformula it so closely follows.

Stockhausen made two major changes to the superformula when adapting it for the piano here. First, the Eve formula (the middle line of the original superformula) is transposed into the upper register, exchanging with the Michael formula which is lowered to the middle, while the Lucifer formula remains in its original position in the bass. This places the Eve formula in the foreground, which is appropriate because in the Licht cycle Monday is Eve's day.) Second, while the Michael formula is essentially unaltered, both the Eve and Lucifer layers are made to seem to be inverted, by a process that Stockhausen called Schein-Spiegelung, or "apparent inversion". This is accomplished by exchanging some of the neighbouring core tones of the melodies. For example, in its original form, the Lucifer formula consists of a hammering, repeated-note low G followed by a powerful, crescendoing upward leap of a major seventh to F♯. This is followed by an ascending scale-like figure, filling in the same interval. In this piano piece that first, many-times repeated note becomes the F♯, which is followed by a downward leap with a crescendo to the low G, An adaptation of the scale-like figure then fills in the descending seventh. The Eve formula, now richly ornamented, similarly exchanges notes so that its originally rising major third, C to E, instead descends from E to C. In one later, exposed place, similar exchanges cause the passage to bear a strong resemblance to the interval sequence with which the Michael formula closes.

=== Klavierstück XV ===
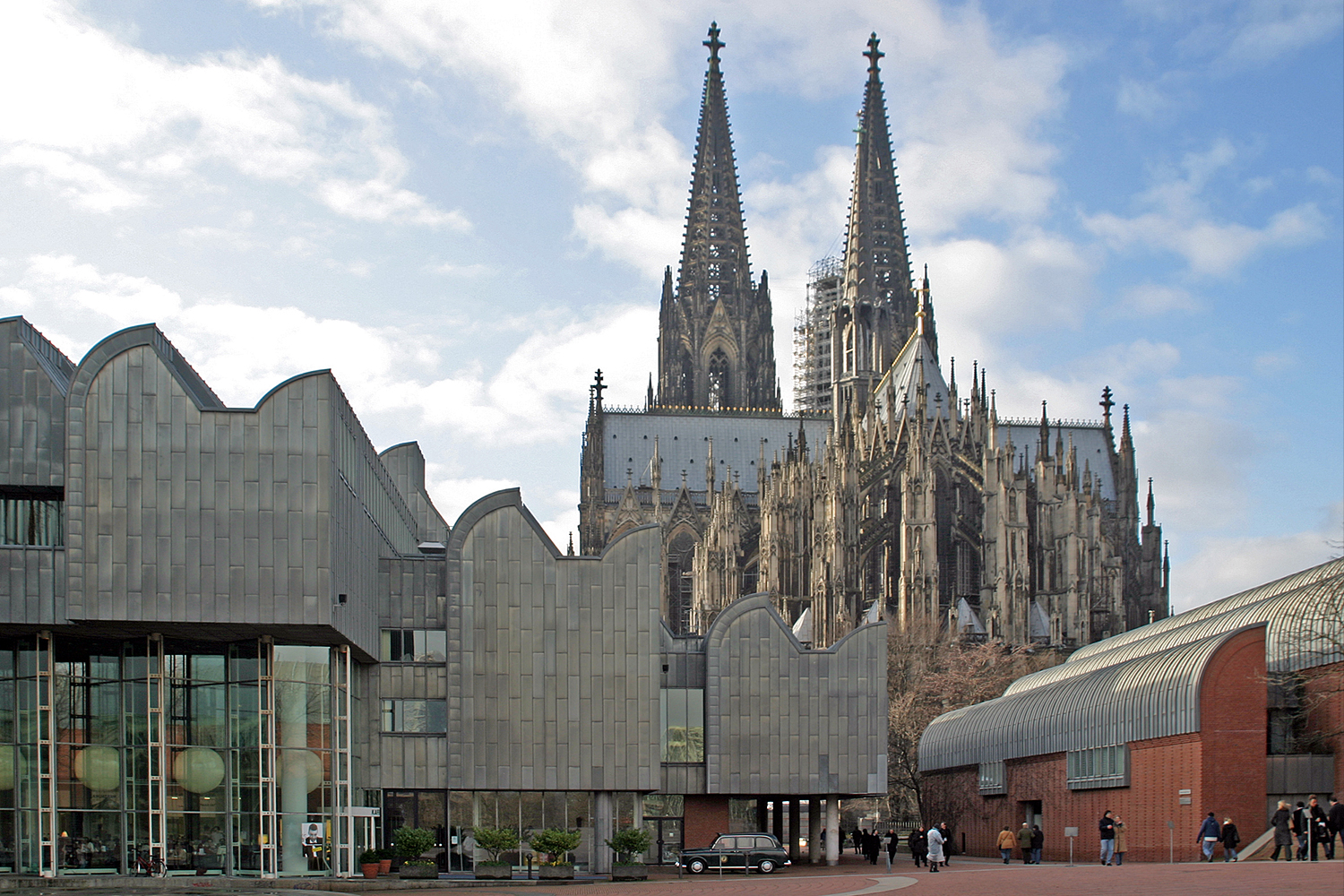
Klavierstück XV was premiered in the Museum Ludwig (Cologne Cathedral in the background)

Beginning with XV ("Synthi-Fou", 1991), which is part of the ending of Dienstag aus Licht, Stockhausen began to substitute the synthesizer (which he also somewhat misleadingly called elektronisches Klavier) in place of the traditional piano, since the German word Klavier historically could refer to any keyboard instrument, and Stockhausen saw the history of the piano logically continued by the synthesizer. In order to differentiate the two instruments, he began calling the traditional instrument "stringed piano" (not to be confused with the technique called "string piano", which Stockhausen nevertheless had used in the Klavierstücke XII–XIV). He also began including an electronic part on tape.

In Klavierstück XV,

The electronic music is played back over eight loudspeakers, which are arranged in a cube around the listeners. Sounds move round about, diagonally, from above to below, and below to above, in eight simultaneous layers with various rates of speed. And Synthi-Fou plays—on four keyboards and with nine pedals—a new music.

The change to synthesizers opened up a host of new technical possibilities. The relationship of the keys to the production of sound is radically different from the piano.

Synthesizers and samplers are no longer dependent on finger dexterity.... The force of striking a key doesn't any longer necessarily have anything to do with loudness, but instead can—according to the programming—bring about timbre alterations, or degrees of amplitude and frequency modulation; or a note may begin at some point to vibrate more or less rapidly, responding to the key pressure, like the Bebung on clavichords in the Baroque.

There are five large sections in Klavierstück XV, titled "Pietà", "Explosion", "Jenseits", "Synthi-Fou", and "Abschied". The score is dedicated to the composer's son, Simon Stockhausen, who gave the premiere performance at the Museum Ludwig in Cologne on 5 October 1992.

=== Klavierstück XVI ===
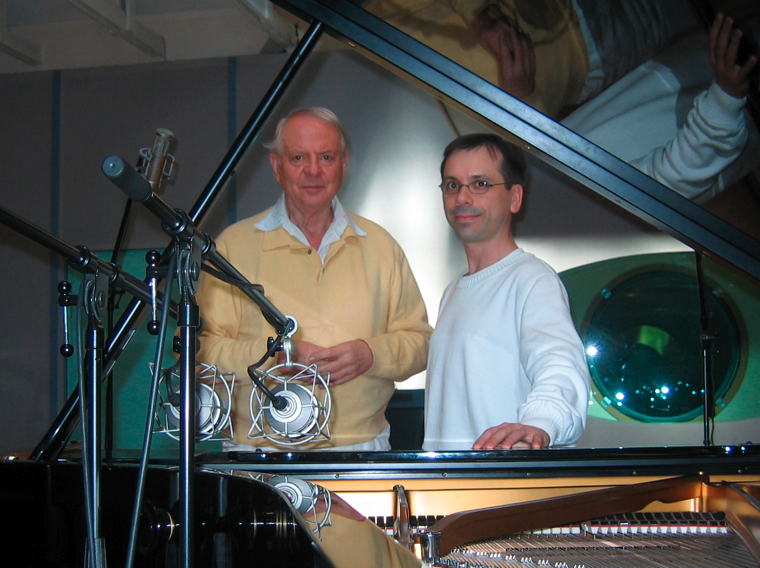
Stockhausen with Antonio Pérez Abellán in 2007

Klavierstück XVI (1995) is for stringed piano and electronic keyboard instruments ad lib. (one player), who plays together with Sound Scene 12 of Freitag aus Licht, on tape or CD.

The piece was written for the 1997 Micheli Competition, who had commissioned a seven-minute piano piece. It was first played in October 1997 to the jury by the three finalists in that competition. According to the preface to the score, the composer's offer to rehearse individually with the pianists was rejected, so he did not hear the result but was told afterward that "they were completely lost and could not imagine how the piece should be played". The first public performance was given by Antonio Pérez Abellán on 21 July 1999 at the Stockhausen Courses Kürten. The score is dedicated to "all pianists who do not only play the traditional stringed piano but who also include electronic keyboard instruments in their instrumentarium".

In Klavierstück XVI, the connection with the Licht superformula is mediated through the melodic structure of Elufa, the ninth "real scene" in Freitag. Although the piece is precisely notated, there is no specific part for the keyboardist to perform. Instead, the performer must choose which notes to perform synchronously with the meticulously notated electronic music. This process has been compared by one writer to the realization of a figured bass in Baroque performance practice.

=== Klavierstück XVII ===
Komet als Klavierstück XVII (1994/99) also uses electronic music from Freitag. According to the score preface, it is to be performed on "electronic piano" (elektronisches Klavier), but this is defined as "a freely chosen keyboard instrument with electronic sound storage, for example a synthesizer with sampler, memory, modules, etc."

The Klavierstücke XII–XVI had each come from a different opera in the Licht cycle and, having already derived XVI from the electronic music of Freitag, Stockhausen's initial idea was to move on to the next opera, Mittwoch, for Klavierstück XVII. An early sketch shows the idea of forming this Klavierstück out of Mittwoch's second scene, Orchester-Finalisten, but the composer ultimately changed his mind and instead returned to the music of Freitag aus Licht for his material.

The score authorizes the performer to create a personal work against the background of the music of the scene "Children's War" from Freitag. The comet is a traditional sign of impending disaster which, combined with the tolling bells of doom and recollection of the opera's scene of a terrible battle of children, express a pessimistic view of the world.

Stockhausen made another version of this piece for a solo percussionist with the same tape accompaniment. It is titled Komet for a percussionist, electronic and concrete musik, and sound projectionist.

The score is dedicated to Antonio Pérez Abellán, who gave the world premiere on 31 July 2000 in a concert during the Stockhausen Courses at the Sülztalhalle in Kürten, Germany.

=== Klavierstück XVIII ===
Klavierstück XVIII, subtitled "Mittwoch-Formel" (2004) is, like the preceding piece, for "electronic piano" (in this case specifically defined as "synthesizer"), but has no tape part.

After the freedom accorded/demanded of the preceding two pieces, Klavierstück XVIII returns to completely determinate notation for the keyboardist. It also returns to the clear presentation of the Licht superformula on the surface level, whose absence starting with Klavierstück XV has been noted. Similar to Klavierstück XIV, this is a simple presentation of the formula, though in this case the four-layered version Stockhausen developed for the composition of Mittwoch aus Licht, consisting of the complete superformula superimposed on a statement of just the Wednesday segment (which, as it happens, only has notes in the Eve layer). It is divided into five parts, corresponding to the first three scenes and two main divisions of the last scene of the opera. The three full formula layers rotate in each of these five sections, with the dominant upper line occupied in turn by the Lucifer, Eve, Michael, Eve, and Michael formulas. This complete formula is stated three times, each time 2:3 times faster than the time before, and each time with the layers given a different timbral colour.

Like the preceding and following pieces, Klavierstück XVIII also exists in a version for percussion—in this case, a percussion trio titled Mittwoch Formel für drei Schlagzeuger. The Klavierstück, however, is approximately twice as fast as the percussion ensemble version.

The world premiere of Klavierstück XVIII was performed by Antonio Pérez Abellán on 5 August 2005, in the Sülztalhalle in Kürten, as part of the seventh concert of the Stockhausen Courses for New Music, which also featured the world premiere of the percussion-trio version of Mittwoch Formel.

=== Klavierstück XIX ===
Klavierstück XIX (2001/2003) is a solo version with tape of the "Abschied" (Farewell) from Sonntag aus Licht, originally composed for five synthesizers.

Although the work has yet to be premiered, one writer speculates that it will likely prove to be

a work in the original spirit of Carré and Kontakte, perhaps even Kurzwellen, in which a principal solo keyboard interacts with four ancillary synthesizers to create a dynamic polyphony in which gestural and timbral imitation, supplemented by a degree of inspired intuition, are the defining features.

Like the previous two Klavierstücke, this one also exists in a version for percussion, in this case titled Strahlen (Rays), for a percussionist and 10-track tape.

== Discography ==
- Armengaud, Jean-Pierre (piano). EMI (France), MFP 2MO47-13165 (LP). [Klavierstück IX, with music by Boulez and Schoenberg.]
- Bärtschi, Werner (piano). Klang-Klavier. Recommended Records, RecRec 04 (LP). Also on RecDec 04 (CD). [Klavierstück VII (recorded 1984), with music by Cage, Scelsi, Kessler, Cowell, Bärtschi, and Ingram.]
- Benelli Mosell, Vanessa (piano). (R)evolution. Decca 00234 3202 (CD). [Klavierstücke I–V, VII–IX (recorded 2014).]
- Benelli Mosell, Vanessa (piano). Scriabin|Stockhausen: Light. Decca 481 2491 (CD). [Klavierstück XII (recorded November 2015).]
- Blumröder, Patricia von (piano). Klavier. Ars Musici, AM 1118-2 (CD). [Klavierstücke IX and XI, with music by Webern, Messiaen, Boulez, Berio.]
- Bucquet, Marie Françoise (piano). Philips, 6500101. [Klavierstücke IX and XI (recorded 1970), with music by Berio.]
- Burge, David (piano). VOX Candide Series, STGBY 637 (LP). Also released on Vox Candide, 31 015 (LP) [Klavierstück VIII, with music by Berio, Dallapiccola, Boulez, and Krenek.]
- Chen, Pi-Hsien (piano). Stockhausen, Beethoven, Klavierstücke, Sonaten. Hat[now]Art 193 (CD). [Klavierstücke I–VI, with Beethoven Sonatas Opp. 101 and 111 (recorded 14–15 April 2014).]
- Corver, Ellen (piano). Klavierstücke, HR Frankfurt. Stockhausen Complete Edition, CD 56 A-B-C (3 CDs). [Klavierstücke I–X, XI (two versions), XII–XIV (recorded 1997–98).]
- Damerini, Massimiliano (piano). Piano XX vol. 2 Arts, 47216-2 (CD). Recorded 1987. [Klavierstück VII, with music by Roslavets, Bartók, Kodály, Berg, Prokofiev, Berio, Bussotti, and Ferneyhough.]
- Drury, Stephen (piano). Avant Koch, 22 (CD). [Klavierstück IX (recorded 1992), with music by Liszt, Ives, and Beethoven.]
- Henck, Herbert (piano). Wergo, 60135/36 (2LPs). Also released on Wergo 60135/36 -50 (2CD) [Klavierstücke I–XI]. Klavierstück I only released on Musik Unserer Zeit, Wergo, WER 60200-50 (CD); Klavierstück XI only released on Piano Artissimo, Piano Music of our Century, Wergo, WER 6221-2 (CD)
- Klein, Elisabeth (piano). "Karlheinz Stockhausen". Point, p5028 (LP) Recorded 1978 at The Louisiana Museum for Modern Art, Denmark. [Klavierstücke I–V, VII–X, XI (2 versions). Different recordings to the later CD recorded by the same pianist]
- Klein, Elisabeth (piano). Karlheinz Stockhausen: Piano Music. Classico, CLASSCD 269 (single CD). Also issued on TIM Scandinavian Classics 220555 (CD). Recorded August 1998. [Klavierstücke V, IX, and two versions of XI, with other Stockhausen works.]
- Kontarsky, Aloys (piano). Stockhausen: Klavierstücke I–XI. CBS, 77209 (2LP boxed set). Recorded July 1965. Supervised by the Composer. Also released in different countries under different numbers: CBS S 72591/2 (2LP); CBS/Columbia 3221 007/008 (USA 2LP); CBS/Sony SONC 10297/8 (Japan, 2LP); Sony Classical S2K 53346 (2 CDs)
- Körmendi, Klara (piano). Contemporary Piano Music. Hungaroton, SLPX 12569 (LP). Also issued on Hungaroton HCD 12569-2 (CD). [Klavierstück IX (recorded 1984), with music by Zsolt Durkó, Attila Bozay, John Cage, Iannis Xenakis].
- Liebner, Sabine (piano). Karlheinz Stockhausen: Klavierstücke I–XI (with two versions of XI). Recorded in Studio 2 of the Bavarian Radio, Munich, 5–6 December 2015 (V, VII, IX), 19–21 September 2016 (VI and two versions of XI), and 14 June 2017I–IV and VIII), and in Studio 1 of the Bavarian Radio, Munich, 21–23 February 2018 (X). Wergo WER 73412 (2 CDs). Released 2018.
- McCallum, Stephanie (piano). Illegal Harmonies. ABC Classics, 456 668–2. [Klavierstück V.]
- Mercenier, Marcelle (piano). Punktuelle Musik (1952) / Gruppen-Komposition 1952/55 [two lectures by Stockhausen]. Stockhausen-Verlag, Text CD 2 (CD). [Klavierstück I, complete and several excerpts.]
- Meucci, Elisabetta (piano). Rivo Alto, RIV 2007 (Italy CD). Released 2001. [Klavierstück IX, with music by Schoenberg and Debussy.]
- Pérez Abellán, Antonio (synthesizer). Klavierstück XVIII (Mittwoch Formel) . Stockhausen Complete Edition CD 79. [With Vibra-Elufa, Komet for percussion, Nasenflügeltanz, Mittwoch Formel for percussion trio.]
- Pérez Abellán, Antonio (piano and synthesizer). Klavierstücke XVI and XVII. Stockhausen Complete Edition CD 57. [With Zungenspitzentanz, Freia, Thinki, Flöte (from Orchester-Finalisten), Entführung.]
- Roqué Alsina, Carlos (piano). Musique de notre temps: Repères 1945/1975. Ades, 14.122-2 (4 CDs). Recorded 1987. [Klavierstück XI (two versions).]
- Rzewski, Frederic (piano). Wergo, WER 60010 (LP). Also released on Heliodor, 2 549 016 (LP); Mace, S 9091 (LP); Hör Zu, SHZW 903 BL (LP); Wergo, WER6772 2 (CD). [Klavierstück X (recorded 22 December 1964), with Zyklus (2 recordings)]
- Schleiermacher, Steffen (piano). Piano Music of the Darmstadt School vol. 1. Scene MDG, 613 1004–2. [Klavierstücke I–V (recorded February–March 2000). With music by Messiaen, Aldo Clementi, Evangelisti, Boulez.]
- Schleiermacher, Steffen (piano). Stockhausen: Bass Clarinet and Piano. Scene MDG, 613-1451 (CD). [Klavierstücke VII and VIII. With Tanze Luzefa!, Tierkreis, and In Freundschaft.]
- Schroeder, Marianne (piano). Hat Hut Records, hat ART 2030 (2LPs). Recorded December 5/6 1984. [Klavierstücke VI, VII, VIII.]
- Stockhausen, Majella (piano). Stockhausen Complete Edition CD 33 (CD). [Klavierstücke XIII (recorded 1983). With Aries]
- Stockhausen, Simon (synthesizer). Synthi-Fou, oder Klavierstück XV für einen Synthesizer Spieler und Elektronische Musik. Stockhausen Complete Edition CD 42 A-B (2 CDs). With Solo-Synthi-Fou, Dienstags-Abschied, and "Klangfarben von Jenseits – Synthi-Fou – Abschied", with spoken explanations by Simon Stockhausen.
- Syméonidis, Prodromos (piano). Hommage a Messiaen Telos TLS 107 (CD). [Klavierstück XI. With music by Messiaen, Xenakis, Benjamin, Murail.]
- Takahashi, Aki (piano). Piano Space. (3LP boxed set) EMI EAA 850 13–15. [Klavierstück XI. With works by Webern, Boulez, Berio, Xenakis, Messiaen, Bussotti, Cage, Takemitsu, Ichiyanagi, Yori-Aki Matsudaira, Takahashi, Yuasa, Satoh, Mizuno, Ishii, Saegusa, Kondo.] Reissued in two volumes: 54 Piano Space I, EMI-Angel EAC 60153 (2LP) and Piano Space II, EMI Angel EAC 60154 (1LP)
- Tudor, David (piano). Karlheinz Stockhausen: Klavierstücke Hat Hut Records hatART CD 6142 (single CD)) [Klavierstücke I–V, VI (early, shorter version of the score), VII–VIII (recorded 27 September 1959), and four versions of Klavierstück XI, (recorded 19 September 1958).]
- Tudor, David (piano). Concerts du Domaine Musical. Vega, C 30 A 278 (LP) mono. [Klavierstück VI, with music by Boulez, Kagel, Pousseur.] Re-issued as part of Pierre Boulez: Le Domaine Musical 1956-1967. vol. 1. Universal Classics France: Accord 476 9209 (5-CD set)
- Tudor, David (piano). "50 Years of New Music in Darmstadt". Col Legno WWE 4CD 31893 (4 CDs) [Klavierstück XI (fifth version), with works by many other composers.]
- Tudor, David (piano). Stockhausen-Verlag, Text CD 6 (CD) [Two versions of Klavierstück XI (recorded 1959), with Schlagtrio and Studie II.]
- Tudor, David (piano). John Cage Shock Vol. 2. With Toshi Ichiyanagi (piano), Kenji Kobayashi (violin), and Yoko Ono (voice). Recorded at Mido-Kaikan in Osaka, 17 October 1962. Omega Point OP-0009/EM1105CD.[N.p.]: Omega Point/EM Records, 2012. [Klavierstück X. With John Cage, 26'55.988 for Two Pianists and a String Player]
- Ullén, Fredrik (piano). Karlheinz Stockhausen: Zyklus, Kontakte, Klavierstücke V & IX Caprice CAP 21642 (CD). [Recorded 1–4 February 2000.]
- Veit, Matthias (piano). Micromania: 85 Piano Miniatures. Recorded at Schüttbau in Rügheim/Unterfranken, December 2008. Chromart Classics TXA 12009 (2-CD set). [Germany]: Andreas Ziegler, 2012. [Klavierstück III and 84 other pieces]
- Wambach, Bernhard (piano). Darmstadt Aural Documents, Box 4: Pianists. Neos 11630 (7 CDs, individually numbered 11631, 11632, 11633, 11634, 11635, 11636, and 11637). Germany: Neos, 2016. [Klavierstück XIII, on CD 4, recorded 20 July 1984, at the Georg-Büchner-Schule, Darmstadt]
- Wambach, Bernhard (piano). Karlheinz Stockhausen: Klavierstücke. (recorded 1987)
  - vol. 1: I–IV, IX, X. Karlheinz Stockhausen, Klavierstücke Schwann MUSICA MUNDI VMS 1067 (LP)
  - vol. 2. Schwann Musica Mundi VMS 1068 (LP). Klavierstücke V–VIII
  - vol. 3. Schwann Musica Mundi 110 009 FA (LP) Klavierstück XI ("2nd version"), Klavierstück XIII (Luzifer's Traum als Klaviersolo). Excerpt from Klavierstück XIII also released on Musik zum Kennenlernen Koch Schwann sampler CD 316 970 (single CD)
  - vol. 4. Schwann Musica Mundi 110015FA (LP). Klavierstück XI ("1st version"), Klavierstück XIV (Geburtstags-Formel), Klavierstück XII (Examen als Klaviersolo).
- Same recordings, reconfigured for CD in three volumes:
  - vol. 1. Koch Schwann CD 310 016 H1 (CD). [Klavierstücke I–VIII.]
  - vol. 2 Koch Schwann CD 310 009 H1 (CD). [Klavierstücke IX, X, XI (2 versions).]
  - vol. 3 Koch Schwann CD 310 015 H1 (CD). [Klavierstücke XII, XIII, XIV.]
- Wambach, Bernhard (piano). Karlheinz Stockhausen: Klavierstücke I-XI. (recorded 2012) Fondazione Atopos ATP 019-20
- Zähl, Jovita (piano), and Claudia Böttcher (soprano). Zeit(t)räume: Karlheinz Stockhausen, Luciano Berio. Recorded September and November 2011 as well as February 2012 at Loft, Cologne. Wergo WER 6749 2 (CD). Mainz: Wergo, 2013. [Klavierstück IX, Stockhausen's Tierkreis for soprano and piano, Berio's Sequenza III and Quattro canzoni popolari.]
- Zitterbar, Gerrit (piano). What about This Mr Clementi? Tacet 34 (CD). [Klavierstück IX, with music by Blacher and others.]
- Zulueta, Jorge (piano). Compositores alemanes del siglo XX. Institución Cultural Argentino-Germana ICAG 001-1 (mono LP). Also released on Discos Siglo Veinte JJ 031–1. [Klavierstück IX, with music by Henze, Hindemith, Blacher.]
- [No performer]. Elektronische und konkrete Musik für KOMET. Stockhausen Complete Edition CD 64. [Electronic music for Klavierstück XVII, with "Europa-Gruss", "Stop und Start", "Zwei Paare", "Licht-Ruf".]
