= Piano piece =

Piece of music for piano

A piano piece or piece for piano (German: Klavierstück, pronounced [klaˈviːɐ̯ʃtʏk]; French: morceau [or] pièce pour (le) piano, pronounced [mɔʁso puʁ l pjano]) is a piece of music for piano. It is a generic name for any composition for the instrument, but when used in a title (Piano Piece, Piece for Piano) the name is used to indicate a (usually) single-movement composition for solo piano that has not been given a more specific name (such as Sonatina, Allegro de concert or Le Bananier), for example:

- Johannes Brahms's Sechs Klavierstücke (Six Piano Pieces), Op. 118
- Arnold Schoenberg's Drei Klavierstücke (Three Piano Pieces)
- Karlheinz Stockhausen's Klavierstücke

As the German word Klavier may indicate other keyboard instruments besides the piano, not all Klavierstücke are composed for the piano; for example, the pieces included in the Klavierbüchlein für Wilhelm Friedemann Bach are rather to be regarded as keyboard pieces than piano pieces.

In 1768 Carl Philipp Emanuel Bach published his Kurze und leichte Klavierstücke, Wq 113. In this case each of the 11 pieces included in the volume has a separate title (Allegro, Arioso, Fantasia, etc.). For Mozart's compositions, Klavierstück may refer to posthumously published pieces without a definite title (e.g. Klavierstück in F, K. 33b), or, as in the Neue Mozart-Ausgabe, to various single-movement compositions for solo piano or other keyboard instrument.

Schubert's Fünf Klavierstücke were published in 1843, 15 years after the composer's death: the first two pieces of this set belong to the same apparently unfinished piano sonata (D 459), the last three (D 459A) may have been conceived as independent piano pieces, although there is considerable speculation as to how they may be grouped in multi-movement sonatas in combination with various piano pieces by Schubert. Another set of three piano pieces by Schubert is also known as his last three Impromptus.

Since the middle of the twentieth century auxiliary instruments, tape, or live-electronics may be employed without changing the basic idea of a solo piano piece, for example Stockhausen's Klavierstück XVI.

There are also multi-movement works titled in the singular, as for example Michael Gielen's Klavierstück in sieben Sätzen "recycling der glocken" (Piano Piece in Seven Movements "Recycling of Bells") for prepared piano, bells, and tape.
