= Marcelle Mercenier =

Belgian pianist

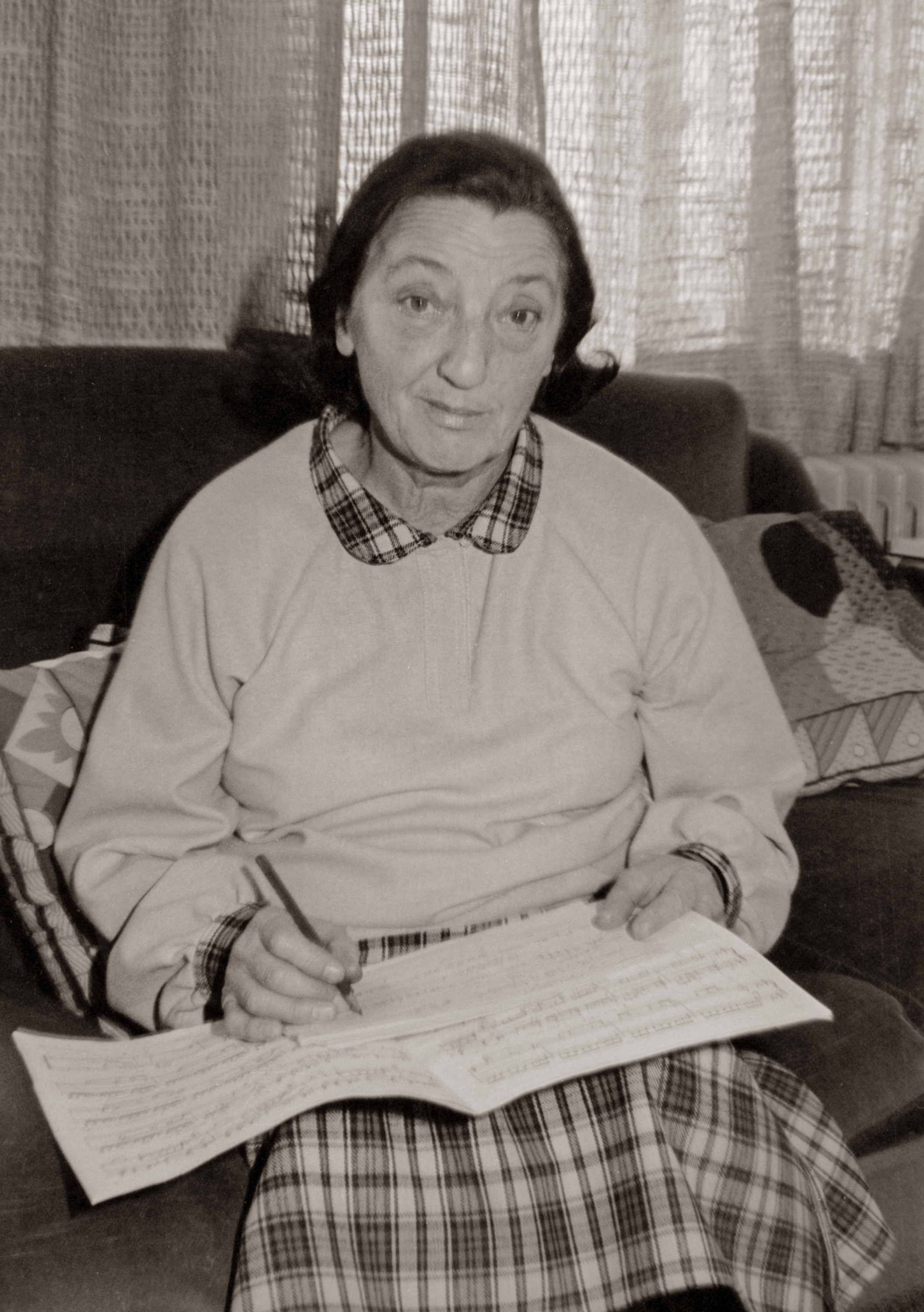
Marcelle Mercenier at home, around 1980

Marcelle Mercenier (21 April 1920 – 13 March 1996) was a Belgian pianist and teacher.

== Life ==
Mercenier was known as an influential pedagogue in Brussels, then in Liège. She was a fervent advocate of contemporary music but also performed Chopin under the baton of Charles Munch and Poulenc with the composer.

She was a member of the group "Séminaire des Arts" created in August 1944 in Brussels. In the concert series of this group, on 28 February 1947 she premiered, together with the flautist Herlin Van Boterdael, the Sonatina for flute and piano by Pierre Boulez, a work that had been composed a year earlier for Jean-Pierre Rampal, but had not been performed by him. The Sonatina was the second work in which Boulez used serial technique, after the Notations for piano of 1945. She premiered works by Karlheinz Stockhausen (Klavierstücke I–IV, which are dedicated to her), Henri Pousseur, and Philippe Boesmans.

== Discography ==
Mercenier recorded the complete Debussy Etudes.

== Sources ==
- Friche, Michèle. 1996. "Disparition de la pianiste Marcelle Mercenier aux sources du contemporain". Le Soir (15 March): 10.
- Gärtner, Susanne. 2002. "Pierre Boulez' 'Sonatine für Flöte und Klavier' und ihre neu aufgetauchte Frühfassung". Die Musikforschung 55, no. 1 (January–March 2002): 51–59. JSTOR 41123858
- Hopkins, G. W., and Paul Griffiths. 2011. "Boulez, Pierre". Grove Music Online, edited by Deane Root (bibliography updated 26 October). Oxford Music Online (accessed 30 May 2015).
