= Electrostatic pickup =

Amplification technology for musical instruments

An electrostatic pickup converts mechanical motion to an electrical signal by means of varying electrical capacitance. This type of pickup, in which the moving plate is a vibrating metal reed, is used in some types of electronic pianos and organs as an inexpensive method of generating tones.

== Principle of operation ==
The electrostatic pickup consists of a capacitor with one stationary plate and one moving plate. The moving plate is typically a steel or brass reed, anchored at one end and free to vibrate at the other end. Another fixed plate is suspended near the vibrating reed, but is electrically insulated. A high voltage is applied between the stationary and moving plates to produce an electric field. The motion of the moving plate induces a varying current through the capacitor formed by the reed and the fixed plate.

The capacitance of the pickup is changed by the motion of the moving plate. As a result of the changing capacitance, a varying current flows into or out of the plates as needed to maintain the proper charge for the new amount of capacitance. This current produces a varying voltage across an external resistor which is amplified to produce a usable output signal.

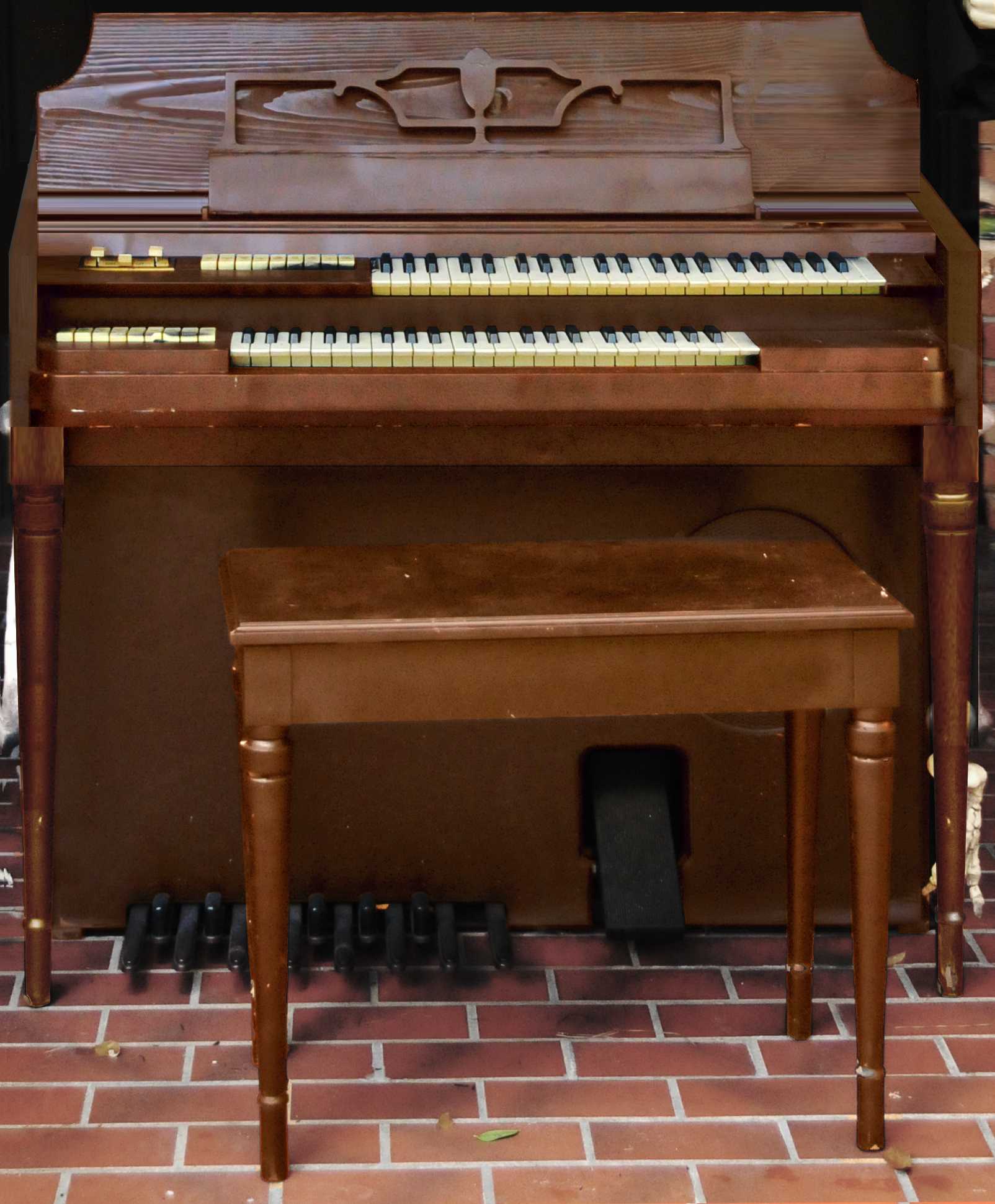
Wurlitzer "Model 44" Electrostatic Reed Organ

== Variations ==
The shape, size and position of the fixed plate relative to the reed has an effect on the capacitance change as a function of the reed's instantaneous position during its travel. This allows different combinations of overtones to be generated from a single reed by placing several fixed plates in different locations, as seen in Wurlitzer electrostatic organs.

The electrostatic pickup used in the Hohner Pianet N electric piano has a fixed plate mounted at a 90-degree angle to the reed, while the fixed plates used in Wurlitzer electrostatic organs are parallel to the reed. The position of the fixed plate in the Pianet is such that the capacitance changes most dramatically when the reed is in the upper portion of its travel. The result is a large second-harmonic content in the resulting signal, similar to that produced by a fuzz box distortion pedal.

== See also ==
- Electrostatic reed organ
  - Everett Orgatron
- Compton organ
- Wurlitzer electric piano
- Hohner Pianet
