= Studie I =

Studie I (English: Study I) is an electronic music composition by Karlheinz Stockhausen from the year 1953. It lasts 9 minutes 42 seconds and, together with his Studie II, comprises his work number ("opus") 3.

== History ==
The composition was created in the Studio for Electronic Music of the NWDR in Cologne between July and November 1953. In the final stages of editing, Stockhausen commemorated the birth of his first daughter, Suja on 25 September 1953 by inserting a "serially unauthorized" 108 Hz (in a phrase attributed to Richard Toop), "one-gun salute". The world premiere took place in Cologne on 19 October 1954 in the concert series Musik der Zeit, together with Stockhausen's Studie II and works by Henri Pousseur, Karel Goeyvaerts, Herbert Eimert, and Paul Gredinger.

The work was important amongst other reasons because it was made (as were the works by Pousseur, Goeyvaerts, and Gredinger) not with the use of (electronic) instruments, like the Trautonium or Melochord, but rather out of pure sine tones. For the first time, complete compositional control was achieved, even over timbre. The ideal was to produce each sound synthetically and thus separately determined in its details: "The conscious organization of music extends to the micro-acoustic sphere of the sound material itself"; It is serially organized on all musical levels.

Unlike Studie II, the score has never been published, apart from the first page as an illustration to Stockhausen's analysis of the piece.

== Materials and form ==
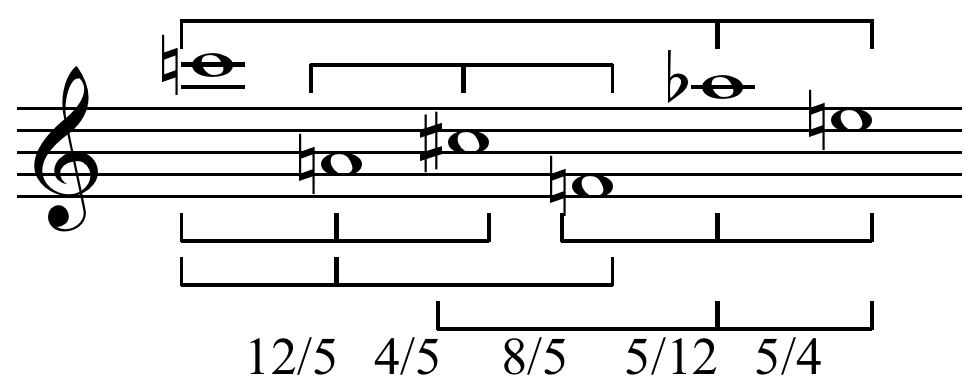
Tone proportions in Stockhausen's Elektronische Studie I,

The fundamental hypothesis for Studie I was that its serial system should begin in the middle of the human auditory range and extend in both directions to the limits of pitch perception. Durations and amplitudes are inversely proportional to the distance from this central reference, so the sounds become both shorter and softer as they approach the upper and lower limits of pitch audibility.

Sets of six values determine the entire work. Pitches are drawn from a series of intervals: a falling minor tenth, rising major third, falling minor sixth, rising minor tenth, and falling major third. Expressed as justly intoned numeric ratios, these are 12/5, 4/5, 8/5, 5/12, and 5/4. Starting from 1920 Hz, near the upper threshold of pitch audibility, thirty-six series of six pitches each are projected, starting with 1920, 800, 1000, 625, 1500, and 1200. The lowest value of 66 Hz is reached at the fourth value of the twenty-second series: 203, 84, 105, 66, 158, 127. All of these ratios are derived from the 5:4 major third, and the resulting timbral combinations resemble the pleasant chiming of a crystal goblet or the combination of vibraphone and glockenspiel – sounds which Stockhausen had previously employed in 1952 in his orchestral compositions Spiel and Formel, respectively.

Studie I is composed with "groups". Like the table of pitches, these groups are also constructed from sets of six numbers so that, for example, the first six "vertical" groups of the composition contain 4, 5, 3, 6, 2, and 1 notes each. Stockhausen calls these note groups "note mixtures", and extrapolates the same grouping principle to the formal structure of the entire work: successive note mixtures form horizontal sequences, groups of these sequences form "structures", and these structures are organized into one large "group series" that produces a unifying proportion series for the entire work. In order to increase the contrast between the note groups, a set of six envelope curves was added: steady amplitude, increasing amplitude to a sudden cut-off at the specified maximum, and a gradual decrease from the specified maximum; each of these occurs with and without reverberation to produce six forms in all.

== Discography ==
- Karlheinz Stockhausen. Studie I, Studie II, Gesang der Jünglinge I. Ten-inch mono LP recording. Deutsche Grammophon DGG 16133. [Hamburg]: Deutsche Grammophon Gesellschaft, 1959. Also released as DG LPE 17 243 (UK 10 inch mono LP). LG 1055 (Japan 10 inch mono LP).
- Karlheinz Stockhausen. Elektronische Musik 1952–1960 (Konkrete Etude, Studie I, Studie II, Gesang der Jünglinge, Kontakte—version for electronic sounds only). CD recording. Stockhausen Complete Edition CD 3. Kürten: Stockhausen-Verlag, 1991.
