= Michel Philippot =

French composer, acoustician, musicologist, aesthetician, broadcaster and educator

Michel Paul Philippot (French: [miʃɛl filipɔ]; 2 February 1925 – 28 July 1996) was a French composer, acoustician, musicologist, aesthetician, broadcaster, and educator.

== Life ==
Philippot was born in Verzy. His studies of mathematics were interrupted by World War II, after which he decided instead to study music, first at the Conservatory of Reims, and then at the Conservatoire de Paris (1945–48), where he studied harmony with Georges Dandelot. He also took private composition lessons from 1946 to 1950 with René Leibowitz, who introduced him to the music of the Second Viennese School. In 1949 he began a career at ORTF in a position as a music producer. In 1959 he became assistant to Pierre Schaeffer in the Groupe de Recherches Musicales, and later worked under Henri Barraud at the radio station France Culture. From 1964 to 1972 he was in charge of music programs, then became a technical adviser to the Director General of Radio France and to the President of the Institut national de l'audiovisuel (INA). From 1969 to 1976 he also taught musicology and aesthetics at the Universities of Paris I and IV, and from 1970 was professor of composition at the Conservatoire national supérieur de musique de Paris. In 1976 he moved to Brazil in order to create the department of music at São Paulo State University, as well as to take up a position as professor at the Universidade Federal do Rio de Janeiro. Upon returning to France in 1983, he resumed his occupation as technical advisor to INA (until 1989) and his professorship at the Paris Conservatory (until 1990). He died at the age of 71 in Vincennes, Paris.

== Music ==
Philippot's compositions are almost exclusively instrumental and forego literary titles. From the outset his works were marked by the discipline of the twelve-tone technique. The austerity of his earlier compositions gave way after the 1950s to a more fluid style indebted in part to Debussy and in part to Schoenberg, particularly to his Variations, Op. 31. His essentially contrapuntal textures adhere to the Schoenbergian principle of continuous variation.

His honors include the Grand Prix national de la musique (1987), and the presidency of the Académie Charles Cros.

== Compositions (selective list) ==
Orchestra

- Overture for chamber orchestra (1949)
- Composition No. 1 for string orchestra (1959)
- Composition No. 2 for strings, piano and harp (1974)
- Composition No. 4 (1980)
- Carrés magiques (1983)
- Concerto for violin and/or viola and orchestra (1984)

Chamber and solo instrumental

- Variations for 10 instruments (1957)
- Transformations triangulaires for flute, clarinet, bass clarinet, horn, trumpet, trombone, two percussionists, violin and cello (1963)
- Composition No. 1 for violin (1965)
- Sonata for organ (1971)
- Passacaille for 12 instruments (1973)
- Composition No. 2 for violin (1975)
- Octet for clarinet, bassoon, horn, string quartet and double bass (1975)
- Composition No. 3 for violin (1976)
- String Quartet No. 1 (1976)
- Septet (1977)
- String Quartet No. 2 (1982)
- Quintet for flute, clarinet, violin, cello and piano (1984)
- String Quartet No. 3 (1985)
- Quintet for piano, two violins, viola and cello (1986)
- Composition for bassoon and piano (1986)
- Composition No. 4 for violin (1988)
- String Quartet No. 4 (1988)
- Ludus sonoritatis for 8 instruments (1989)
- Contrapunctus X for 10 instruments (1994)
- Méditation for 12 instruments (1994)

Tape

- Etude No. 1 (1951)
- Etude No. 2 (1957)
- Etude No. 3 (1962)

Piano

- Piano Sonata No. 1 (1947)
- Piano Sonata No. 2 (1973)
- Composition No. 4 for piano (1975)
- Composition No. 5 for piano (1976)
- Composition No. 6 for piano (1977)

Vocal

- Quatre mélodies for soprano and piano (1948); words by Guillaume Apollinaire
- Romance d'Hallewyn for voice, brass, percussion, celesta and violas (1950)

Film scores

- Cyrus le grand (1960); directed by Feri Farzaneh
- Concerto pour violoncelle (1962); written and directed by Monique Lepeuve

== Writings (selective list) ==
A complete list and full French texts of many items:

- 1952. "L'école de Vienne." Revue du C.D.M.I.
- 1953. "Musique et Acoustique—ou a propos de l'art de combiner les sons." Cahiers M. Renaud Barrault
- 1962. "Métamorphoses Phénoménologiques." Critique. Revue Générale des Publications Françaises et Etrangères, no. 186 (November 1962). English as "Ansermet's Phenomenological Metamorphoses", translated by Edward Messinger. Perspectives of New Music 2, no. 2 (Spring–Summer 1964): 129–140.
- 1965. Igor Stravinsky. Musiciens de tous les temps n°18. Paris: Seghers.
- 1975. "Arnold Schoenberg and the Language of Music." Perspectives of New Music 13, no. 2 (Spring–Summer): 17–29.
- 1976. "Ear, Heart, and Brain." Perspectives of New Music 14, no. 2 and 15, no. 1 (Spring–Summer and Fall–Winter): 45–60.
- 1978. "Musique du temps, musique d'un temps." La Revue musicale, no. 316–3:39ff.
- 1983. "Rameau, la lumière de la raison et la raison du coeur." À Cœur Joie (27 December).
- 1987. "Heitor Villa-Lobos et la France." Les Cahiers de la Guitare et de la Musique, no. 23:17.
- 2001. Diabolus in Musica: Les Variations de Beethoven sur un Thème de Diabelli. Paris: L’Harmattan. ISBN 2-7475-1328-9 (on the Diabelli Variations)
