= Studie II =

Studie II (English: Study II) is an electronic music composition by Karlheinz Stockhausen from the year 1954 and, together with his Studie I, comprises his work number ("opus") 3. It is serially organized on all musical levels and was the first published score of electronic music.

== History ==
The composition was provisionally titled Bewegungen (Motions), but the name was later changed to Studie II. It was commissioned by what was then the NWDR, in whose Studio für elektronische Musik in Cologne the piece was created. The world premiere took place in Cologne on 19 October 1954 in the concert series Musik der Zeit, together with Stockhausen's Studie I and works by Henri Pousseur, Karel Goeyvaerts, Herbert Eimert, and Paul Gredinger.

In contradistinction to musique concrète, Stockhausen wanted no longer "to use any electronic acoustic sources, with the sound spectra already built up (Melochord, Trautonium), but only produced from the pure tones of a frequency generator ('pure' notes without overtones)", therefore using neither electroacoustic instruments nor other found sounds. The ideal was to produce each sound synthetically and thus separately determined in its details: "The conscious organization of music extends to the micro-acoustic sphere of the sound material itself".

He had previously tried out sound synthesis with pure tones in Studie I. However, an aesthetic problem arose: "Instead of a fusion of the pure tones into new, more complex sounds, the individual pure tone components appeared separately audible and are easily identifiable. Thus, the impression develops of chords formed from pure tones instead of a new sound quality. On the other hand, the individual pure tones receive their own sound quality owing to their easy identifiability, about comparable to the specific sound of a simple music instrument somewhere between a flute and special pipe-organ registers".

== Materials and form ==
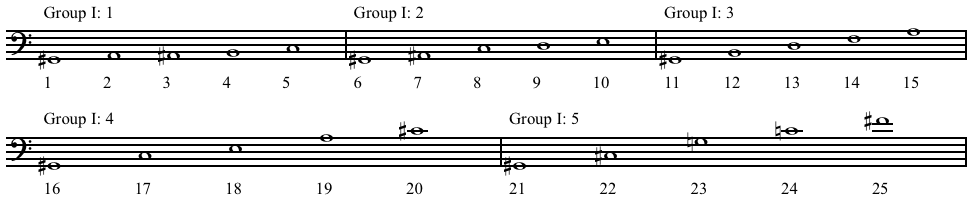
Tone mixtures in Group I of Stockhausen's Elektronische Studie II Group I: 1

Stockhausen's two Elektronische Studien are amongst the earliest examples of composition with what he called "groups", in contrast to the earlier concept of punctualism or "point composition", in works like Kreuzspiel.

The idea at the core of Studie II was the decision to extrapolate everything from the number five. Five main sections are each divided into five subsections, and each subsection contains five groups consisting of one to five sounds, called "tone mixtures". Each of these tone mixtures is constructed as five equally spaced, reverberated sine tones. The width of the tone mixtures remains constant within each group, but changes from group to group in five widths derived from an underlying scale. For the pitches, Stockhausen built a scale in which the interval between successive steps consists of the frequency proportion $\sqrt[25]{5}$—in other words, the interval of 5:1 (two octaves plus a just major third) is divided into 25 equal parts. This differs from the traditional tempered tuning system, in which an octave consists of twelve segments, the interval between two adjacent steps being therefore defined by the ratio $\sqrt[12]{2}:1$. The intervallic unit is a "large semitone", about 10% larger than the semitone of the equal-tempered twelve-tone system. Beginning at 100 Hz, this scale reaches to ca. 17,200 Hz, with a total of 81 equally spaced pitches. Because of the chosen basic interval, no octave duplications can occur. The highest pitch, 17,200 Hz, is near the upper limit of human hearing, and occurs only in a single tone mixture, as the uppermost of its five pitches.

The five sections of the piece are differentiated in the first instance by the types of groups employed: horizontal (melodic) or vertical (chordal). Horizontal groups are either connected (legato) or separated by silences; vertical groups either attack all notes together and end with one note after another, or build up gradually into a chord and then end together. The pattern is as follows:

1. horizontal, with linked sounds;
2. vertical, with groups alternately beginning and ending simultaneously;
3. horizontal, with silences between the sounds;
4. vertical, as in section 2;
5. combination of horizontal and vertical.

== Reception ==
Studie II was part of the very first "concert presentation of compositions developed in the Cologne studios of NWDR" (from the programme of the premiere of the piece from 19 October 1954). On this evening the public heard for the first time a purely electronic piece based on sine tones. The effect of the sounds and noises was accordingly unforeseeable and new, and the associated composition methods on the public.

In the course of time Studie II became a milestone not only in Stockhausen's early work, but in the history of the electronic music generally. In his Gesang der Jünglinge, he used recorded and transformed vocal sounds in addition to electronic sounds; later he built on Gottfried Michael Koenig's procedure of "transforming unification of the originally diverse", as he also incorporated sounds performed live (in the orchestral composition Mixtur as well as in the instrumental and/or vocal pieces of ensemble of Mikrophonie I and Mikrophonie II) or ring modulated recordings of traditionally produced music (in the tape composition Telemusik).
