= Cosmic Pulses =

Electronic composition by Karlheinz Stockhausen

Cosmic Pulses is the last electronic composition by Karlheinz Stockhausen, and it is number 93 in his catalog of works. Its duration is 32 minutes. The piece has been described as "a sonic roller coaster", "a Copernican asylum", and a "tornado watch".

== History ==
Cosmic Pulses is the Thirteenth Hour of the unfinished Klang (Sound) cycle. Massimo Simonini, artistic director of Angelica, commissioned the piece in partnership with the Dissonanze festival of electronic music. Stockhausen began realising the piece in December 2006. The world premiere occurred on 7 May 2007 at Auditorium Parco della Musica (Sala Sinopoli) in Rome.

In the Klang cycle, Cosmic Pulses represents a turning point. It is the beginning of the second half of the cycle, and all of the music after the thirteenth hour is electroacoustic, employing partial mixdowns of Cosmic Pulses as the tape accompaniment. A recording of the piece was released on CD 91 by the Stockhausen-Verlag. The CD also presents the beginning moments of all 24 isolated layers on separate tracks.

== Materials and concepts ==
The number 24 is central to the construction of Cosmic Pulses. There are 24 layers of sound. There are 24 "melodic loops", spaced throughout 24 different registers (spanning 7 octaves). There are 24 different tempi.

Stockhausen defines the tempi in the piece as units of 8 tones and pulses The fastest tempo is 240 beats per minute (bpm). Eight pulses per 240 bpm equals 1,920 tones and pulses per minute. The low end of the tempo scale is 1.17 bpm, which yields 9.36 tones and pulses per minute.

The source timbre for the piece is a synthesizer. Antonio Pérez Abellán was responsible for constructing and synchronizing the layers. The loops are layered on top of each other, beginning in the low register and moving to the high register. They are staggered in a way that the low loops drop out as the high loops take over, creating a rough progression from low sounds to high over the course of the piece.

Stockhausen used a basic graphic notation to indicate how each loop should be altered from its fundamental form through pitch and tempo changes. Stockhausen called these changes glissandi, requiring them to be smoothly executed with faders for a continuous deviation from the original loop. Kathinka Pasveer realized these ornamentations using his score. The tempo could change by as much as a factor of 12, and the pitch variations could be as narrow as a tritone or as wide as a major tenth.

Cosmic Pulses is designed for an 8-channel sound system that surrounds the audience in a square, with 2 channels on each side and a subwoofer on every channel. Stockhausen chose 241 trajectories for sound to travel through such a system. Therefore, each loop has a specific path to travel through the system.

For the first time, I have tried out superimposing 24 layers of sound, as if I had to compose the orbits of 24 moons or 24 planets (for example, the planet Saturn has 48 moons) … If it is possible to hear everything, I do not yet know—it depends on how often one can experience an 8-channel performance. In any case, the experiment is extremely fascinating!

During his lectures surrounding the German premiere, Stockhausen said that he had "not made up his mind concerning it" yet, and he admitted that the piece might be regarded as "not music, just sound" and it might be better to "just take it as a natural phenomena [sic] and not think of composition".

== The OKTEG ==
Joachim Haas and Gregorio Karman from the Experimental Studio for Acoustic Art of Südwestrundfunk (SWR, "Southwest Broadcasting") in Freiburg, which had been founded on 1 September 1971 as the Experimentalstudio der Heinrich-Strobel-Stiftung des SWF, created the OKTEG, a special piece of equipment to allow Stockhausen to realize the spatialization manually. They brought the OKTEG to Kürten in March 2007 to spatialize the piece. Other firms had done similar things for Stockhausen. For example, the WDR studio technicians built a manually driven "rotation table" for the production of Kontakte in 1958–59, and an improved, electrically driven model (capable of up to 25 rotations per second) for Sirius in the early 1970s. The Modul 69 B for Mantra, was built to the composer's specification by the Lawo company from Rastatt, near Baden-Baden, a switcher-controller, a regulator-distributor, and two "rotation mills" for the spherical pavilion at Osaka's World Fair, were built to Stockhausen's designs by Mr Leonard of the Firma Electronic in Zürich in October 1968.

The OKTEG (Octophonic Effect Generator) relies on a Max/MSP patch that uses eight variable-law amplitude panning modules. The modules are driven by individual sequencers with tempo control. An execution queue containing the rotation data specified by Stockhausen's maps managed the messages that controlled all eight sequencers. Motor faders allowed real-time adjustment of the tempo of each sequencer. The performance of these real-time adjustments was encoded as a frequency-modulated audio-rate sawtooth. This signal was then recorded as an audio track in ProTools. This audio track is then used as a controller to realize the finished audio files.

== Reception ==
After the world premiere performance, Stockhausen signed autographs for an hour and a half. The German premiere at the Stockhausen Courses was met with a partial standing ovation as well as some boos. Reviewing the course concerts in MIT's Computer Music Journal, Nick Collins called the source timbre "a rather cheap electric piano sound", and reported that those in the audience "who had heard more recent electroacoustic music were slightly perturbed by the bad timbre at the start for the source sound". However, Collins observed that this was "quickly subsumed into the granular storm as the layers gather and tempi increase", concluding that, notwithstanding audience consensus that "the overload last[ed] too long in the middle … It might cautiously be claimed that Mr. Stockhausen achieved a controversial success, and created a work that has reinvigorated his electronic music". Collins shared his shorthand notes, which he scribbled in the dark during the performance:

violent spasms of space, serial recurrences, a Copernican asylum, over-literal crashes, rushing more and more beyond sense, like being inside Stockhausen's mind as he composes, a battle of enraged keyboardists in a tempo war, granular roars, bass pedals and clatters, gurgling granules accelerate, pushing the boundary of information, tapes spooling mercilessly, a labyrinth of tone pulses, a multiplicity of collisions in an organ factory, even poor synthesis can't ruin this controlled chaos, wider and wider dynamics and layering, building to the synchronies of planets, raging layers, raging presets in a keyboard shop war, a fight at an audio convention.

Describing the UK premiere at the BBC Proms, Nick Emberley felt that "the Albert Hall sounded like a mighty beast woken from slumber". Richard Morrison wrote in The Times that the piece was "half an hour of mesmerisingly complex, and sometimes oppressively rumbly, electronica that ping-ponged round the hall like billions of electrons in a whirlwind", but hearing it alongside Stimmung, Morrison concluded "it was impossible not to feel that Stockhausen's time came and went many decades ago."

In The Sunday Times, Paul Driver described Klang as characteristically "portentous" and the organization around the 24 hours of the day as unexpectedly "obvious". He praised Cosmic Pulses, "If one tried to imagine a kind of background roar to the universe, this is surely how it would be: incessant and implacable, like magnified wave crashes, cheerfully apocalyptic." John Allison wrote that Cosmic Pulses "was thrilling: as rumbling and splintering noises ricocheted around the Albert Hall, it felt as if Stockhausen had dropped a microphone into deepest space." George Hall concluded that "the most riveting of the concert's offerings turned out to be the purely electronic Cosmic Pulses, a 30-minute continuum of mighty and minute sounds ricocheting round the hall like some infinite, inter-galactic bunfight. Stockhausen's vast output is erratic, but the best is surely here to stay." Ivan Hewett described the piece as "a vast, half-hour hurricane of sound" that "to my earthly ears it seemed oppressively unvaried, despite fascinating moments". Andrew Clements wrote admiringly "[Cosmic Pulses] is an extraordinarily powerful creation by any standards, both poetically beautiful and utterly terrifying. It is a work of immense complexity and unmistakable power, and it sees him using the electronic medium with a mastery that no other composer has matched."
