= Klang (Stockhausen) =

Cycle of musical compositions by Karlheinz Stockhausen (2004–2007)

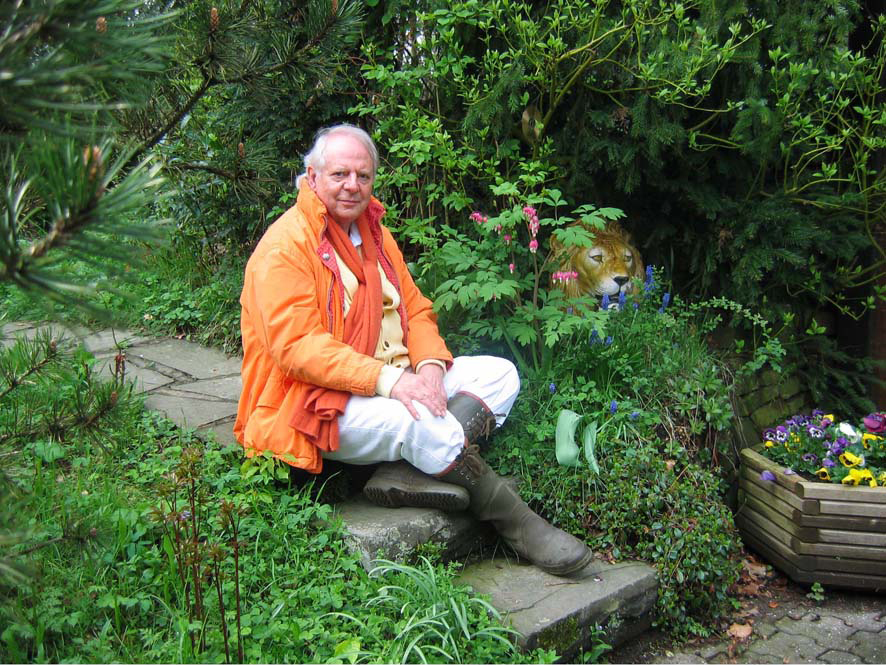
Karlheinz Stockhausen in his garden on 20 April 2005, two weeks before the premiere of the First Hour of Klang

Klang (pronounced [klaŋ]), also known as The 24 Hours of the Day (German: Die 24 Stunden des Tages) is a cycle of compositions by Karlheinz Stockhausen, on which he worked from 2004 until his death in 2007. It was intended to consist of 24 chamber-music compositions, each representing one hour of the day, with a different colour systematically assigned to every hour. The cycle was unfinished when the composer died, so that the last three "hours" are lacking. The 21 completed pieces include solos, duos, trios, a septet, and Stockhausen's last entirely electronic composition, Cosmic Pulses. The fourth composition is a theatre piece for a solo percussionist, and there are also two auxiliary compositions which are not part of the main cycle. The completed works bear the work (opus) numbers 81–101.

== History and character ==
After having spent 27 years composing the opera-cycle Licht (1977–2004), Stockhausen felt he was shifting his focus from the visible world of the eyes—Licht is the German word meaning "light", as of the stars, the sun—to the invisible world of the ears. When planning his new cycle of pieces based on the hours of the day, he initially considered several possibilities for the title: Day, Nacht und Tag (Night and Day), Liebe (Love), Chi (the life energy), or Spiegel (Mirror). The name he finally settled on, Klang, means "sound", acoustic vibrations, but for Stockhausen, above all "the INNER EAR, for the divine Klang, the mystic sound of the beyond with the voice of the conscience, in German: die Stimme des Gewissens".

Although the solo percussion work Himmels-Tür has a decidedly theatrical character, the cycle otherwise consists of essentially concert works. Three are for unaccompanied solo performer, one is a duo, seven are trios, one a septet, one is a purely electronic composition, and the remaining eight compositions are for soloist accompanied by electronic music.

With Klang Stockhausen moved away from the formula technique he had used from Mantra (1970) until the completion of the opera-cycle Licht in 2004. The pieces are based on a 24-note series (each note of a two-octave chromatic scale) that has essentially the same all-interval sequence as the series for Gruppen, and from which other formal and parametric properties are derived on a work-by-work basis. Starting from the Fifth Hour, this row is used in inversion, until returning to its original form from the Thirteenth Hour onward.

Stockhausen also felt that he was returning to the moment form approach he had used in the late 1950s and 1960s, in works such as Kontakte, Momente, Telemusik, and Hymnen.

It seems that I am listening again more for moments, atmospheres, rather than formulas with their limbs, transpositions, transformations. Certainly both methods conjoint[ly] lead to good music. A special concentration and freedom must be trained for listening to the soul['s] vibrations..

A new device of proliferating "rhythm families" was developed for the first "hour" (Himmelfahrt) and is employed in many of the subsequent pieces. In addition, the exploration of multiple simultaneous tempi, pioneered in Zeitmaße (1955–56) and Gruppen (1955–57), is pursued in Himmelfahrt and the trios of hours 6–12; in the 13th hour, Cosmic Pulses, this is taken to the verge of sonic saturation.

Initially, Stockhausen had no overall plan for the cycle but in the summer of 2006, as he was finishing Cosmic Pulses, he altered his method of work and grouped the component pieces into three subcycles. In doing so, he displaced Cosmic Pulses from its originally intended position as the Sixth to the Thirteenth Hour. One theory has been advanced that the Fibonacci series (1, 2, 3, 5, 8, 13, 21, etc.) may be the reason these two subcycles start on the fifth and thirteenth hours, and the second ends on the twenty-first. Another hypothesis is that Stockhausen meant to close the circle with a third, seven-member, "overnight" subcycle covering hours 22, 23, 24, and the already-completed 1–4, which would drive home the fact that midnight is not a natural "beginning" of the daily cycle, but only an arbitrary, human convention. Combined with the "morning" (hours 5–12) and "afternoon-evening" (hours 13–21) subcycles, this would divide the 24 hours of Klang into a distributive serial proportion pattern of 7:8:9.

On 30 November 2007, Stockhausen wrote to Udo Zimmermann, director of the Ars Viva Festival in Munich, politely declining an invitation to attend a performance on 25 January 2008, because "I have reserved the days—and nights—when your rehearsals and performance take place to work on a new composition." Doubtless the new work was to have been one of the remaining hours from Klang but, five days later, Stockhausen suddenly died, leaving the cycle incomplete. After his death, a search in his sketchbooks failed to discover any plans for the remaining three hours.

The last six component works to be premiered were given in Cologne as part of the collective premiere of the cycle, at the MusikTriennale Köln festival on 8–9 May 2010, by members of musikFabrik and others, in 176 individual concerts. Klang in its entirety was premiered in the US by Analog Arts when the Metropolitan Museum of Art in New York City opened their Met Breuer building. The cycle was performed in three venues: the flagship museum on Fifth Avenue, the Met Breuer (which closed in 2020), and The Cloisters museum on 25 and 26 March 2016.

== Extramusical aspects ==
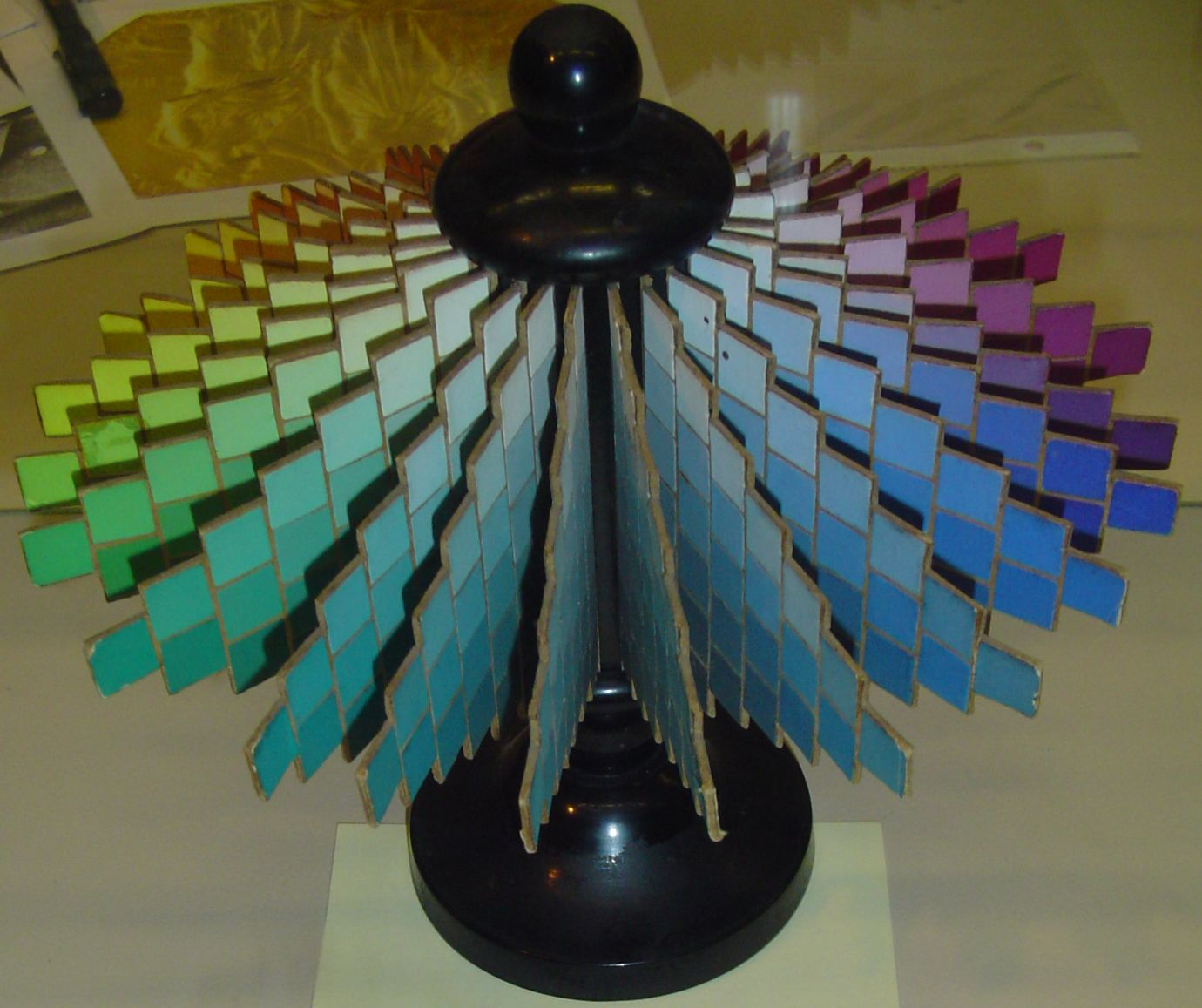
Ostwald's "colour double-cone" (made in 1918) displaying the 24-hue colour circle with 28 shades per hue

"The 24 Hours of the Day suggest a circle and two half circles of 2 × 12 hours like night and day, and also 4 × 6 hours like night—morning—afternoon—evening, or 8 × 3 hours like the Horen (Hours) of the Christian cycle of daily prayers.

As had been the case with the Licht cycle, Stockhausen associated each component work with a colour. In this case, he sought out colour theories using circular models with 24 hues. He settled on Wilhelm Ostwald's colour cycle, published in three books in 1917, and modified it to suit his needs: "The Ostwald circle originally starts number 1 with the brightest colour yellow at midday of an ordinary clock, but in the colour circle for KLANG I change the order and start with the darkest colour at one o'clock in the night. Accordingly I turn the circle by one step in order to coincide with a clock".

The resulting colour circle is printed on the cover of both the score and the CD of the Third Hour, Natural Durations, and in. The 24 colours are specified in the German HKS system for printing the covers of the scores, and it is suggested in the prefaces to many of the scores that clothing of the corresponding colour might or should be worn when performing that piece. In at least one case, the performer is cautioned to avoid "any associations with known cultures".

== First Hour: Himmelfahrt ==
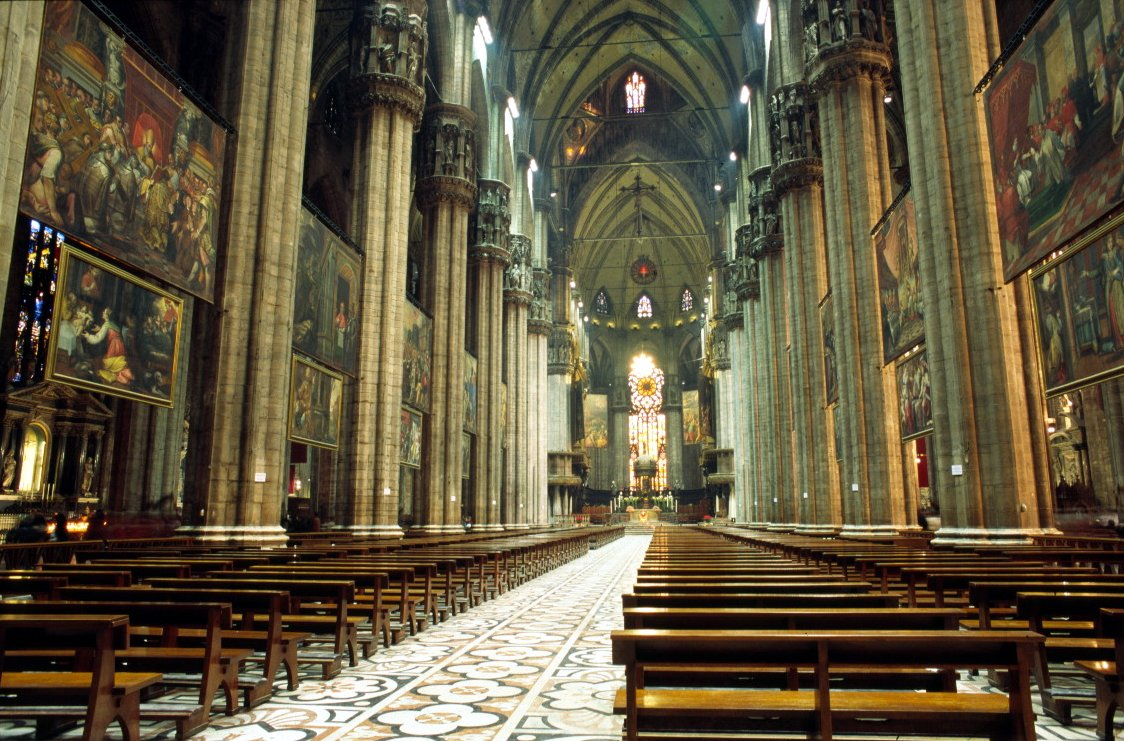
Interior of the Milan Cathedral, where the First and Second Hours of Klang were premiered

Himmelfahrt (Ascension), for organ or synthesizer, soprano, and tenor. 2004–05 (36 mins.). Work number 81. The specified colour is deep violet-blue.

Himmelfahrt was premiered at the Milan Cathedral on 5 May 2005 (version with organ), by Alessandro La Ciacera, organ, Barbara Zanichelli, soprano, Paolo Borgonovo, tenor, and Karlheinz Stockhausen, sound projection. The North American premiere (and second performance overall) took place at the Schwartz Center for the Performing Arts at Emory University in Atlanta on 11 October 2005, by Randall Harlow, organ, Teresa Hopkin, soprano, John Bigham, tenor, and Steve Everett, sound projection. The version with synthesizer was premiered in the Sülztalhalle, Kürten on 9 July 2006, Antonio Pérez Abellán, synthesizer, Barbara Zanichelli, soprano, Hubert Mayer, tenor, and Karlheinz Stockhausen, sound projection.

Himmelfahrt was commissioned, with the support of a Milanese bank, by the priest and organist Don Luigi Garbini, director of the Laboratory of Contemporary Music in the Service of the Liturgy (LmcsL), for performance in the Milan Cathedral on Ascension Thursday 2005, as part of the Pause Festival that year. LmcsL, founded by Don Luigi in 1999 with the support of the then-Archbishop of Milan, Monsignor Carlo Maria Martini, had launched the multidisciplinary Pause Festival in 2004. It included Stockhausen's famous 1956 electronic composition, Gesang der Jünglinge. When Stockhausen mentioned at that time his plan for a new cycle of compositions, Don Luigi seized the opportunity to commission the First Hour, because Stockhausen's approach to music "seems truly sacred".

The work uses 24 different tempos in a chromatic time scale, and the part for organ or synthesizer requires 24 corresponding registrations/timbres—the more complex and heavier timbres for slower tempos, the more transparent and lighter timbres for the faster tempos. The keyboardist's two hands are required to play in different tempos simultaneously, performing "temporal head-stands for both hands—actually impossible for us today—and the relationship of the tempo to the intensity of a sound-colour was composed by me in the spirit of the Ascension: unimaginable—unheard—invisible". The composer felt this "is like compelling a man to the physical rupture that allows him to go in the form of a spirit to another world".

The text proclaimed by the two singers was written by Stockhausen himself, and refers freely to the Ascension of Christ. The vocal parts, however, only occur intermittently, and it is the keyboard instrument that accounts for the largest share of the music. The score describes an ascent, like climbing a stairway to the Most High, and is divided into 24 moments. The ascent, however, is not a constant progression—the climber sometimes seems to stop to look behind him or around him.

== Second Hour: Freude ==
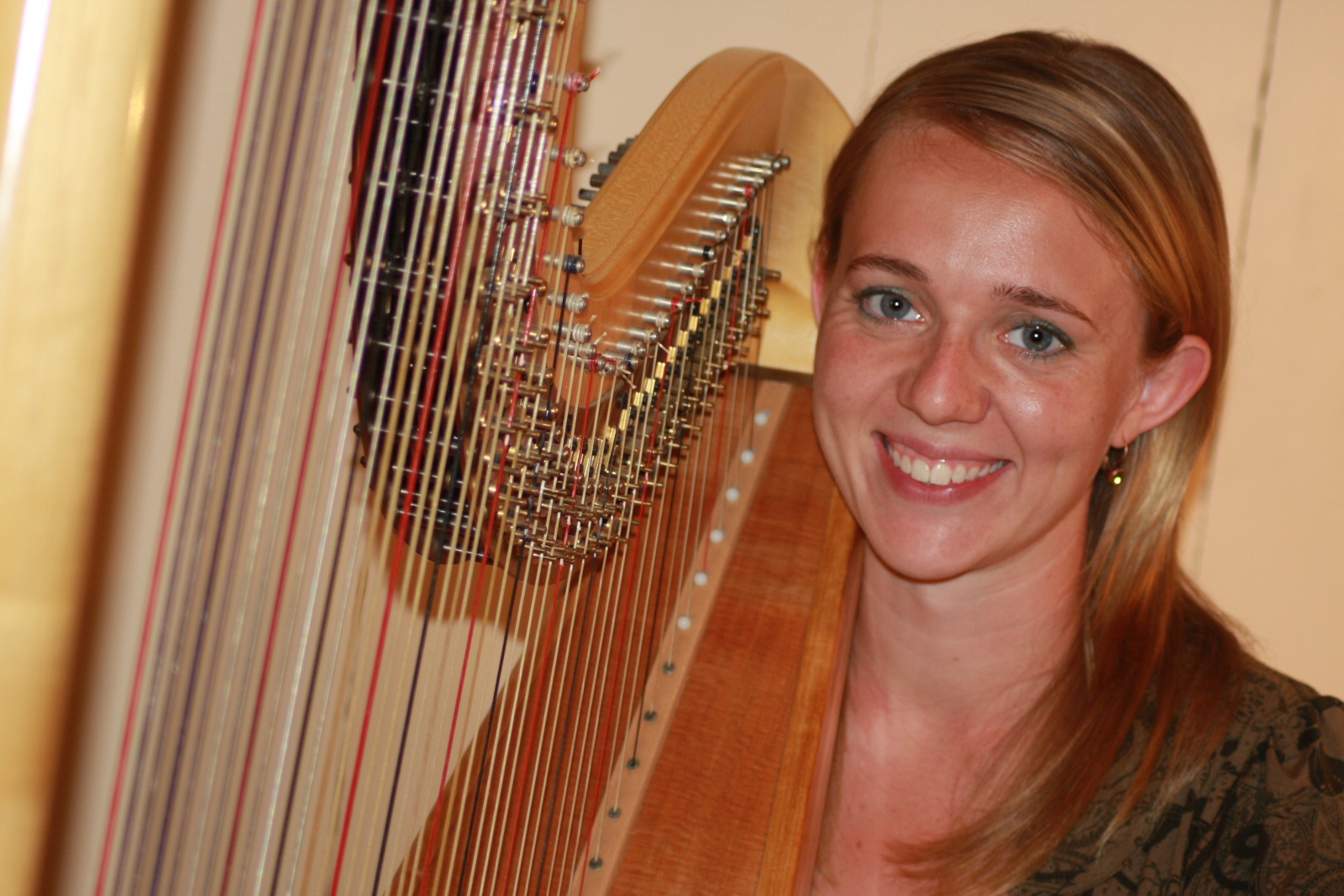
Marianne Smit, together with Esther Kooi, premiered Freude, the Second Hour of Klang.

Freude (Joy), for two harps. 2005 (40 mins.). Work number 82. The specified colour is a medium blue.

Freude was premiered in the Milan Cathedral on 7 June 2006 by Marianne Smit and Esther Kooi, harps. The American premiere was given in New York on 2 May 2010 by June Han and Bridget Kibbey.

The earliest sketch for the Second Hour of Klang is headed with the title Galaxien (Galaxies), and has a later alternative suggestion of Kreuz-Klang-Rätsel (Cross-Klang-Puzzle). When Stockhausen received a commission from Don Luigi Garbini of the Milan Cathedral for the work, to be premiered for Pentecost 2006, he provisionally titled the work Pentecost, and chose as text the Pentecost hymn "Veni Creator Spiritus", to be sung in Latin by the two harpists as they play. Following the 24 verses of the Latin hymn, the work is composed, like the First Hour, in 24 moments, and the title was changed to Freude, because this was the fundamental feeling Stockhausen had about the composition.

The text setting is sometimes syllabic, sibilant, employs speech-song, and in places evokes plainchant and early polyphony. The music probes the meaning of joy through a deep and detailed text-setting reminiscent of the "frighteningly beautiful" Mikrophonie II of 1965.

At the French premiere in Lyon on Friday, 8 March 2008, the "formidable interpretation" by its dedicatees, the harpists Marianne Smit and Esther Kooi, Freude produced "the effect of a fountain of youth". At the New York premiere two years later, "Appreciating a sophisticated composition brilliantly executed was only natural. But if you gave yourself over to Stockhausen's calculated mix of ritualistic vocals and the harps' intrinsic glamour, the peculiar divinity he envisioned seemed almost within reach."

== Third Hour: Natürliche Dauern ==
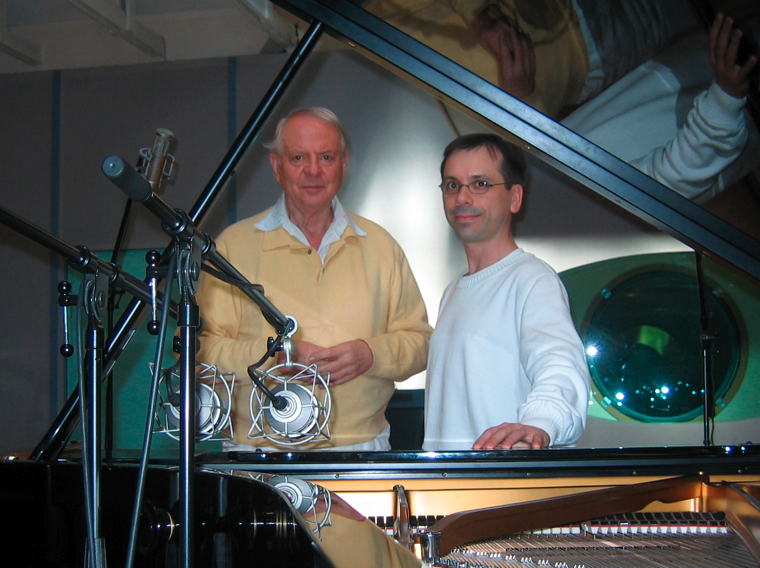
Stockhausen with Antonio Pérez Abellán during the recording sessions for Natürliche Dauern 16–24

Natürliche Dauern 1–24 (Natural Durations 1–24), for piano, 2005–06 (ca. 140 mins.). Work number 83. The specified colour is teal blue.

Natürliche Dauern consists of 24 pieces for solo piano. No. 1 was premiered in New York 23 February 2006, at the Holy Trinity Church, 65th Street and Central Park West by Philip Edward Fisher; nos. 2–15 were premiered at the Sülztalhalle in Kürten on 12 July 2006 by the pianists Benjamin Kobler and Frank Gutschmidt; nos. 16–24 were premiered in Lisbon on 17 July 2007 by the Spanish pianist Antonio Pérez Abellán, to whom these are dedicated.

There are various ways to determine the intervals of entry using the durations of tones or sounds, whereby each time the entire rhythmic development of a piano piece is governed by natural durations. In some of the pieces, the durations are regulated by prescribed in- and exhaling, or by the resonances of RIN (Japanese temple instruments) which are struck. In this cycle, also various degrees of difficulty of the piano playing result in natural durations—for example, intervallic leaps of various sizes, or the way fingers mesh, or the bunching together of simultaneously played keys, or combinations of attacks, clusters, glissandi and the more or less complicated notation of the attack durations.

== Fourth Hour: Himmels-Tür ==
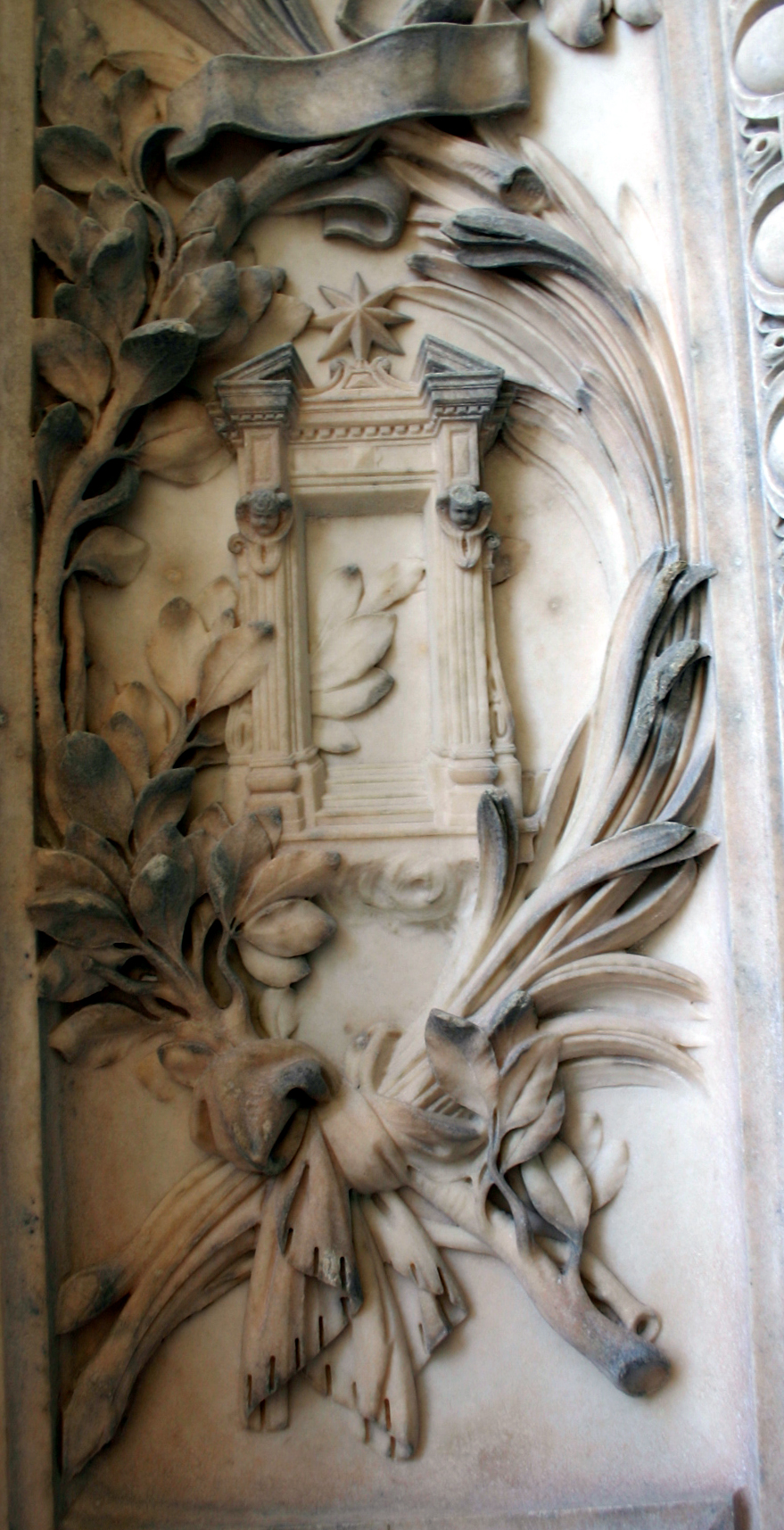
Heaven's Door, depicted on the main entrance of the Milan Cathedral

Himmels-Tür (Heaven's Door), for a percussionist and a little girl, 2005 (ca. 28 mins.). Work number 84. The specified colour is bright blue [Hellblau].

Himmels-Tür was commissioned by the Italian concert organisation Angelica, and composed in 2005. It was premiered on 13 June 2006 in the Teatro Rossini in Lugo, Italy, by the American percussionist Stuart Gerber and Arianna Garotti as the little girl. Gerber gave the German premiere a few weeks later at the Stockhausen Courses in Kürten.

The only overtly theatrical piece from Klang, the idea for Himmels-Tür came to Stockhausen in a dream, in which he found himself at the gates of heaven, which are locked against him. (Several of Stockhausen's earlier theatrical compositions—such as Trans, Musik im Bauch, and the Helicopter String Quartet—also had their origins in dreams.) Because of the indefinite pitches of the instruments (a large double-panelled door and an assortment of cymbals and gongs), Himmels-Tür is the only work in the Klang cycle that does not use the 24-note series extrapolated from the all-interval "Gruppen" row.

"A percussionist beats with wooden beaters on a heaven's door made of wood. It is divided from bottom to top into six fields. Sometimes he (she) stomps on the floor with his (her) nailed shoes." There are fourteen main sections defined by moods, such as "cautious", "entreating", "agitated", and "angry", until finally, the door opens. "After a moment of silence, the percussionist cautiously steps through the doorway and disappears. A terrifying noise of tam-tams, hi-hats, and cymbals bursts out”, not to mention sirens. "A little girl comes out of the audience onto the stage, and disappears through the doorway. The metallic sounds become increasingly rare and gradually cease. Finally, the siren stops".

It is probably no coincidence that many years earlier, in Kontakte, Stockhausen had associated metallic sounds with the "heavenly", in contrast to the "earthly" sounds of skin percussion (entirely absent in Himmels-Tür), with wooden sounds functioning as a transition between them, like the door to heaven here. Although the graphic notation is unconventional, the improvisatory appearance of both the performance and the score is deceptive. Every stroke, every gesture is precisely specified in its rhythm, dynamics, and timbre.

Although originally planned to occupy twenty-four pages (a number found generally throughout the cycle, reflecting the number of hours in a day), the final score consists of just twenty-two. The first sixteen are performed on the door, the remaining six behind the door, out of sight of the audience. In the first, larger section of the work the number of strokes, types of strokes, and door panels on which the percussionist performs are controlled by global serial factors, but the details are not serially determined. By contrast, the closing section, with the metal percussion instruments played backstage, is serially organised using number squares, including a version of the source square for the second set of Klavierstücke from 1954–55.

=== Türin ===
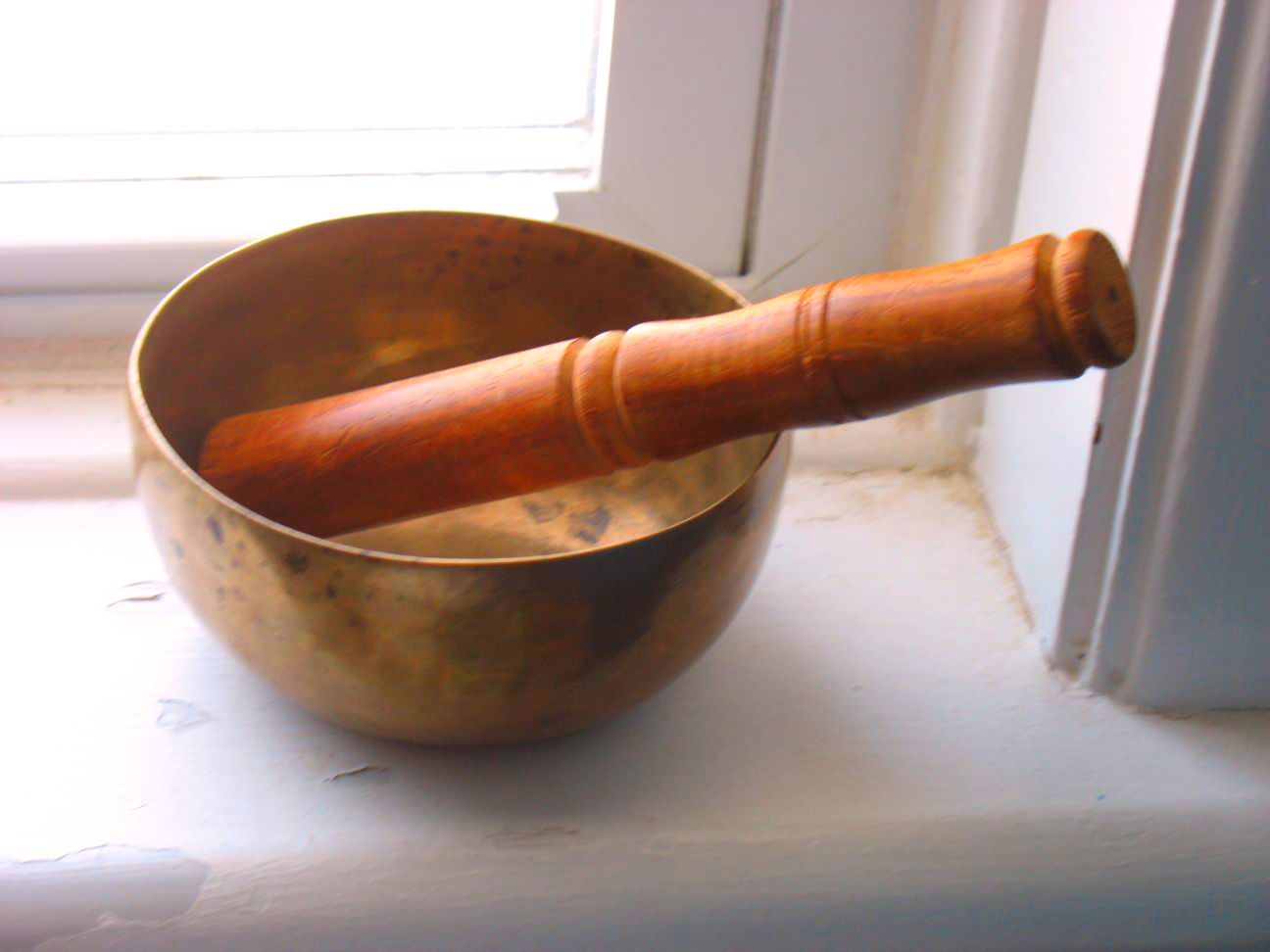
Japanese rin, one of the sound sources in Türin

In just two days in October 2006, Stockhausen realised a 13-minute electronic work to accompany Himmels-Tür on its first CD recording. The title Türin combines the names of the two sound sources used, the door (German: Tür) from the percussion piece, and a chromatic set of rin—Japanese bowl-gongs that Stockhausen had previously used in several compositions, such as Telemusik, Inori, Lucifer's Dance from Samstag aus Licht, and the orchestra version of Hoch-Zeiten from Sonntag aus Licht, as well as in Himmelfahrt (Hour 1) and the twenty-second piece of Natural Durations (Hour 3) from Klang. The recorded sounds of strokes on the door are electronically processed to focus their pitch and extend their resonance, and a rin stroke of the corresponding pitch is added to each attack.

The composition, written in September 2006 and realised on 7 and 8 October, consists of a single, stately presentation of the 24-tone Klang row in its original transposition, in rhythms derived from the pitches. Within each of these long tones, Stockhausen's voice intones a different "noble word" (such as "hope", "fidelity", "balance", "generosity", etc.). The utter simplicity of this piece puts it at the opposite extreme from the hyper-complex Cosmic Pulses, work on which was already in progress at the time Türin was created.

There are two versions of Türin, one with the words spoken in German, the other in English. According to the composer, these "noble words" are meant to keep the Himmels-Tür open (booklet accompanying Stockhausen Complete Edition CD 86, pp. 12 & 24). This composition was not assigned a work-number by Stockhausen, but is now included in the official catalogue of his works as "Nr. 84 extra".

== Fifth Hour: Harmonien ==
Harmonien (Harmonies), for bass clarinet, or flute, or trumpet, 2006 (ca. 15 mins.). Work number 85. The specified colour is HKS 50 (light greenish blue).

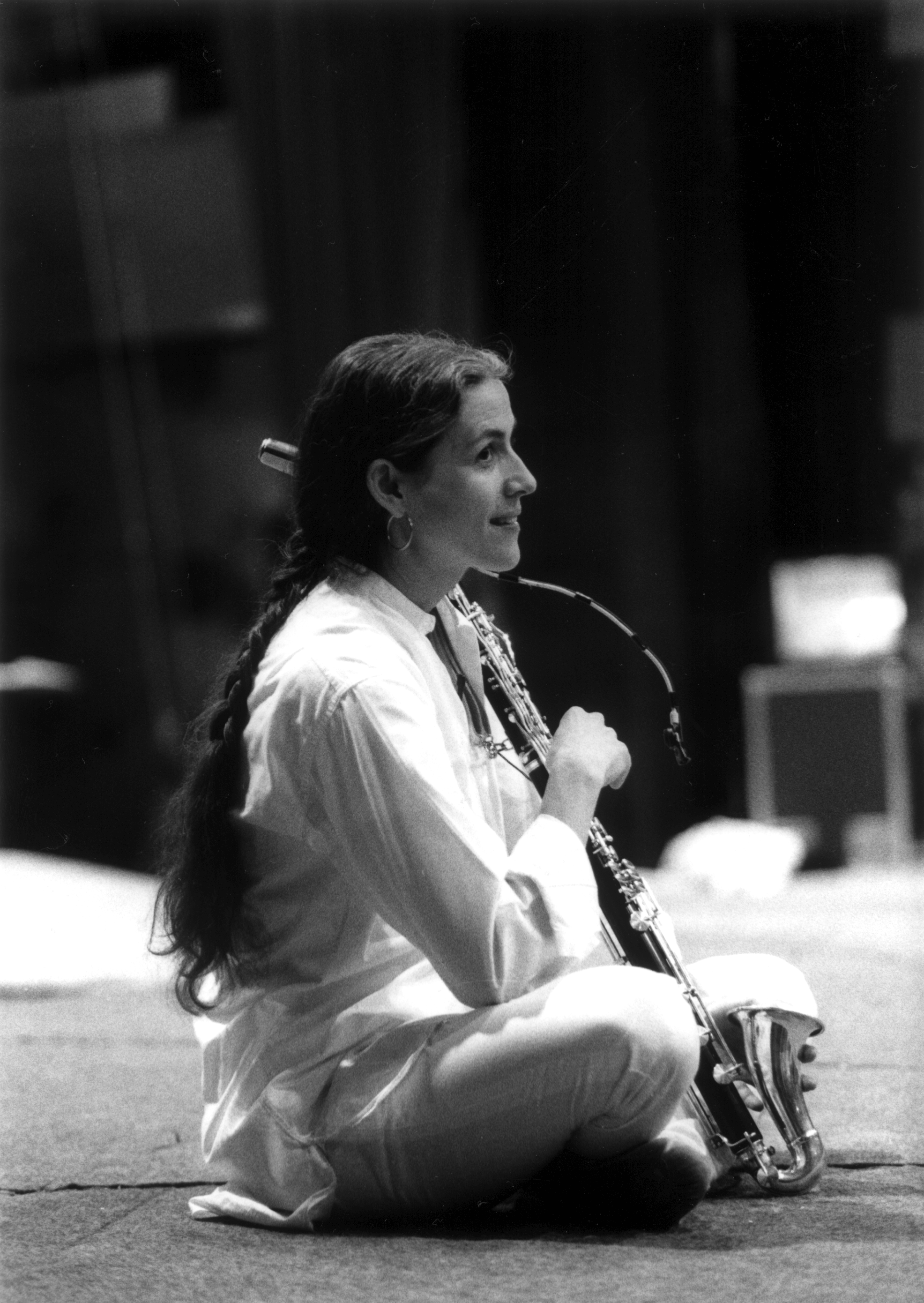
Suzanne Stephens, for whom the first version of Harmonien was composed

The bass clarinet version (work number 85.1) was premiered in Kürten on 11 July 2007 by Suzanne Stephens; the flute version (work number 85.2) was premiered in Kürten 13 July 2007 by Kathinka Pasveer; the trumpet version (work 85.3) was premiered on 2 August 2008 by Marco Blaauw in London at a BBC Proms concert.

The bass clarinet version, originally titled Akkorde (Chords), was the first to be composed, as a birthday gift for Suzanne Stephens. The flute and trumpet versions were made by transposing the entire work up by a whole tone, with numerous adjustments to fit the range and character of the instruments, as well as a few small additions. While the bass clarinet and flute versions are purely instrumental, in the trumpet version the player speaks three words between the four introductory notes: "Lob sei Gott" ("May God be praised").

Stockhausen's original idea for the Fifth Hour of Klang was to have an unaccompanied instrumental piece in three different versions (for bass clarinet, flute, and trumpet), followed by a longer trio for the same instruments, built from the same material. In this conception, it was to have been called Akkorde (Chords). The title was later changed to Harmonien. Late in 2006 or early in 2007, when Stockhausen decided to group some of the hours into subcycles, the original trio became Hour 6, and the first of a set of seven trios extending to Hour 12, all based on the material of the three versions of Harmonien. In keeping with Stockhausen's original idea of having each piece reflect the spirit of the hour of the day to which it is assigned, the character of Harmonien and the following trios (especially the ones scored for winds) suggest an aubade—especially suitable for Hours 5 and 6, but less so for the subsequent hours reaching to mid-day. In May 2006 Stockhausen wrote two sets of aphorisms which are related to the "noble words" used in Türin, which are meant to "hold open the Heaven's Door" of the fourth hour. Except for Glanz, the titles of the trios are all found amongst these noble words, which in turn appear to be derived from one of Stockhausen's favourite books, the Sufi Message by Hazrat Inayat Khan.

Harmonien falls into five large sections, each made from a 25-note series. This series is the inversion of the 24-note row developed originally for Himmelfahrt, with the first note recurring at the end. This recurring note is regarded as the central pitch of the row. Each of the five sections uses a different transposition of this series, with central pitches (in the bass-clarinet version) on D♭, E♭, A, G, and A♭, which are the fifth through ninth notes of the original (prime form) of the Klang series. Each of these 25-note cycles is then subdivided into five groups of 3, 4, 5, 6, and 7 notes, permuted differently in each cycle, resulting in a total of twenty-five groups containing 125 notes. At the end, a final D♭ is added as the 126th note, returning to the central pitch of the first cycle. A fixed rising-falling registral scheme is applied to the 25 notes in each cycle and a twenty-four-step "chromatic" scale of tempos is added, from slowest to fastest according to register (low to high) and returning to its starting point for the twenty-fifth note of each cycle. The entire 126-note melody is then fitted with a duration scheme derived from the retrograde of the fifth of the twelve "rhythm families" previously devised for Himmelfahrt. These melodically fixed notes differ from the practice of twelve-tone technique, and resemble the formula composition Stockhausen had used between 1970 and 2004.

At the end of each group, the component 3, 4, 5, 6, or 7 pitches are played in rapid "loops" or "ritornelli". These ritornelli give the work its name: "Harmonies come into being from successions of melodic groups. ... At the end of a group, its pitches are repeated as very fast periods without rhythm and in different registral distribution, so that the melody has a harmonic effect, like a vibrating chord".

The last two of the five large cycles are each interrupted by a cadenza. The first is a "bass cadenza", found between the fourth and fifth groups of the fourth cycle and was planned from the outset. The second, which interrupts the third group of the last cycle, is in the treble register and was added after a first version of the composition had been finished. For the flute and trumpet versions only, Stockhausen added a coda as well.

=== Katikati ===
At about the time he was working on Harmonien in 2006, Stockhausen composed a short (ca. 4 minutes) flute piece for Kathinka Pasveer, titled Katikati. This work has not yet been premiered, and its connection (if any) with the Klang cycle has not been determined, but it has been assigned the work number 85.2 extra, following the flute version of Harmonien in the composer's work list.

== Sixth Hour: Schönheit ==
Schönheit (Beauty), for flute, bass clarinet, and trumpet, 2006 (ca. 30 mins.). Work number 86. The specified colour is HKS 51 (turquoise blue).

The premiere of Schönheit was given in Lisbon on 5 October 2009, at the Grande Auditório of the Gulbenkian Foundation by Suzanne Stephens (bass clarinet), Marco Blaauw (trumpet) and Kathinka Pasveer (flute). Schönheit was commissioned by the music department of the Fundação Calouste Gulbenkian, Lisbon.

Schönheit is the original trio of the subcycle comprising hours six to eleven, and as such is also the simplest. The other six trios permute its five main sections and add new material as insertions between them, creating introductions, codas, interludes, or cadenzas. This permutability is an example of what Stockhausen called "polyvalent form", and these seven trios may be regarded as seven different versions of a single composition. According to Marco Blaauw, "Like Bach's Art of the Fugue, it is therefore a work of synthesis which requires a great intellectual effort on the part of the listener." As in the trumpet version of Harmonien, the performers punctuate the introductory chords with the words "Lob sei Gott", spoken in unison.

Like Harmonien (which supplies the basic materials), Schönheit is in five sections. Each section contains all of the groups from all three versions of the respective cycle of Harmonien, including the ritornelli and the cadenzas, permuted in various ways. They are so arranged that three consecutive sets of groups occur in the combined trio texture, while at the same time each instrument presents all of the groups from its version of Harmonien linearly—though in permuted order. These quotations may occur one at a time, or with two or three simultaneously. Because the original tempos are preserved along with the notes and rhythms, when two or three are quoted at the same time, simultaneous combinations of any of the twelve tempos are possible, resulting sometimes in complex relations belied by the seeming simplicity of the sounding music.

When only one or two quotations are present, new accompanying material is sometimes added in the remaining part or parts. In the first large section this is ordered into a process involving five different accompanimental types; later they become progressively less systematic. The course of the entire piece describes a gradual linear process of increasing complexity. Stockhausen sometimes rotates segments of the row through the three instruments in a "homophonic canon" The work concludes with a tonal authentic cadence in D♭ major—the same central pitch as the original bass-clarinet version of Harmonien.

== Seventh Hour: Balance ==
Balance, for flute, cor anglais, and bass clarinet. 2007 (ca. 30 mins.). Work number 87. The specified colour is HKS 54 (bluish green [Verkehrsgrün]).

Balance was the third trio to be composed, after Schönheit and Glanz. It was given its premiere in the Großer Sendesaal of the Westdeutscher Rundfunk (WDR), Cologne, on the composer's eightieth birthday, 22 August 2008, by members of ensemble recherche.

This trio takes the five sections from Schönheit in retrograde order, which yields a process of steadily increasing clarity and distinctness of subdivisions. Solo interludes for the cor anglais are inserted before the second and third sections, and a cadenza for the same instrument occurs between sections 3 and 4. There is also a concluding coda composed especially for this trio.

At the end of this trio, the performers speak in unison the Latin words of the first two lines of the Greater Doxology: "Gloria in excelsis Deo / et in terra pax hominibus bonae voluntatis" (Glory to God in the highest / and on earth peace, goodwill to all people).

== Eighth Hour: Glück ==
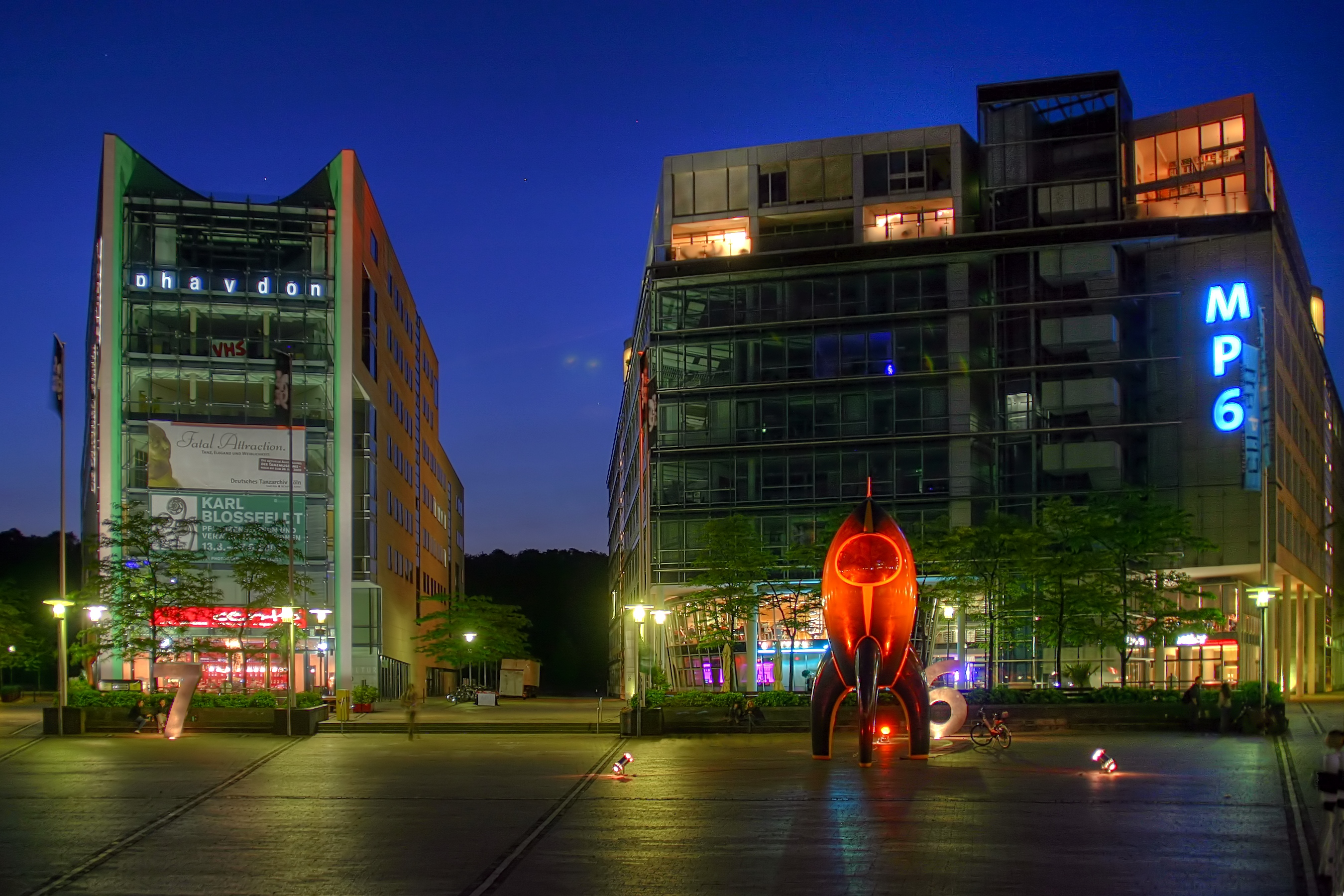
Mediapark 7 (left), in Cologne, where the Eighth Hour was premiered in the Studio der musikFabrik on 8 May 2010

Glück (Bliss), for oboe, cor anglais, and bassoon. 2007 (ca. 30 mins.). Work number 88. The specified colour is HKS 60 (yellow-green).

After having completed Schönheit, Glanz, and Balance, Stockhausen had no commissions for the remaining four trios, and so turned his attention to the composition of the "Urantia" hours 14 to 21. There are no written sketches for Glück, Hoffnung, Treue, and Erwachen, apart from a manuscript with specifications of their instrumentation dated 8 March 2007. In the cases of Balance and Glanz, photocopies of the score of Schönheit were marked up with indications of how to proceed, but there are also no similar documents for the eighth, ninth, eleventh, and twelfth hours. Stockhausen had verbally communicated to Kathinka Pasveer the permutations of the five sections and instructions for distributing the inserts, and it was because of these instructions that the last four trios could be assembled after Stockhausen's death. Since there are no duplication of the inserts between Glanz and Balance, had he lived to complete these last four trios himself, it is likely that Stockhausen would have composed different “magical inserts” for each of them.

Glück was premiered on 8 May 2010 at the Studio der musikFabrik in Mediapark 7 in Cologne, by members of musikFabrik, as part of the MusikTriennale Köln. The performers were Peter Veale (oboe), Piet van Bockstal (cor anglais), and Edurne Santos (bassoon). Sound direction was by Hans-Günther Kasper.

Glück permutes the five sections from Schönheit in the order 4 2 5 1 3. The only material added to these five basic sections is a coda adapted from the fourth (tuba) insert from Glanz. As in the other trios, the performers speak words aloud in unison. In this case, they are "Noten zu Klängen zu Kreislauf zu Glück" ([Written] notes to sounds to circular movement to bliss) and "GOTT ist GLÜCK" (God is bliss).

== Ninth Hour: Hoffnung ==
Hoffnung (Hope) for violin, viola, and cello. 2007 (ca. 35 mins.). Work number 89. The specified colour is HKS 67 (yellowish-green).

Hoffnung was premiered in the Klaus-von-Bismarck-Saal at the WDR in Cologne on 31 August 2008 by members of musikFabrik: Juditha Haeberlin (violin), Axel Porath (viola), and Dirk Wietheger (cello).

Hoffnung is the sole example in Stockhausen's output of a piece scored for the standard string trio of violin, viola, and cello. Only in the Helicopter String Quartet did he similarly write for a standard small ensemble of strings, but there only with considerable additional technology. The performers in Hoffnung are asked to rotate their positions on the stage, and to describe certain musical figures with gestures in the air. Near the end, they speak in unison the words, "Dank sei Gott ... Danke Gott für das Werk ... Hoffnung" (Praise be to God ... Thank God for the work ... Hope". The uniform string timbre of Hoffnung is reflected by the scoring of two of the other trios: the Eighth Hour, Glück, is for three double reeds, and the Eleventh Hour, Treue, is for three sizes of clarinet (the Tenth Hour, Glanz, also includes a homogeneous trio—of brass instruments—though these occur in separate solo and duo inserts, as supplemental timbres to the original mixed instrumental trio).

Hoffnung reverses the order of the sections in the preceding trio, Glück, which means the original sections from Schönheit now occur in the sequence 3 1 5 2 4. The only added material here is a coda, made by combining the Anfang and first insert from Glanz.

== Tenth Hour: Glanz ==
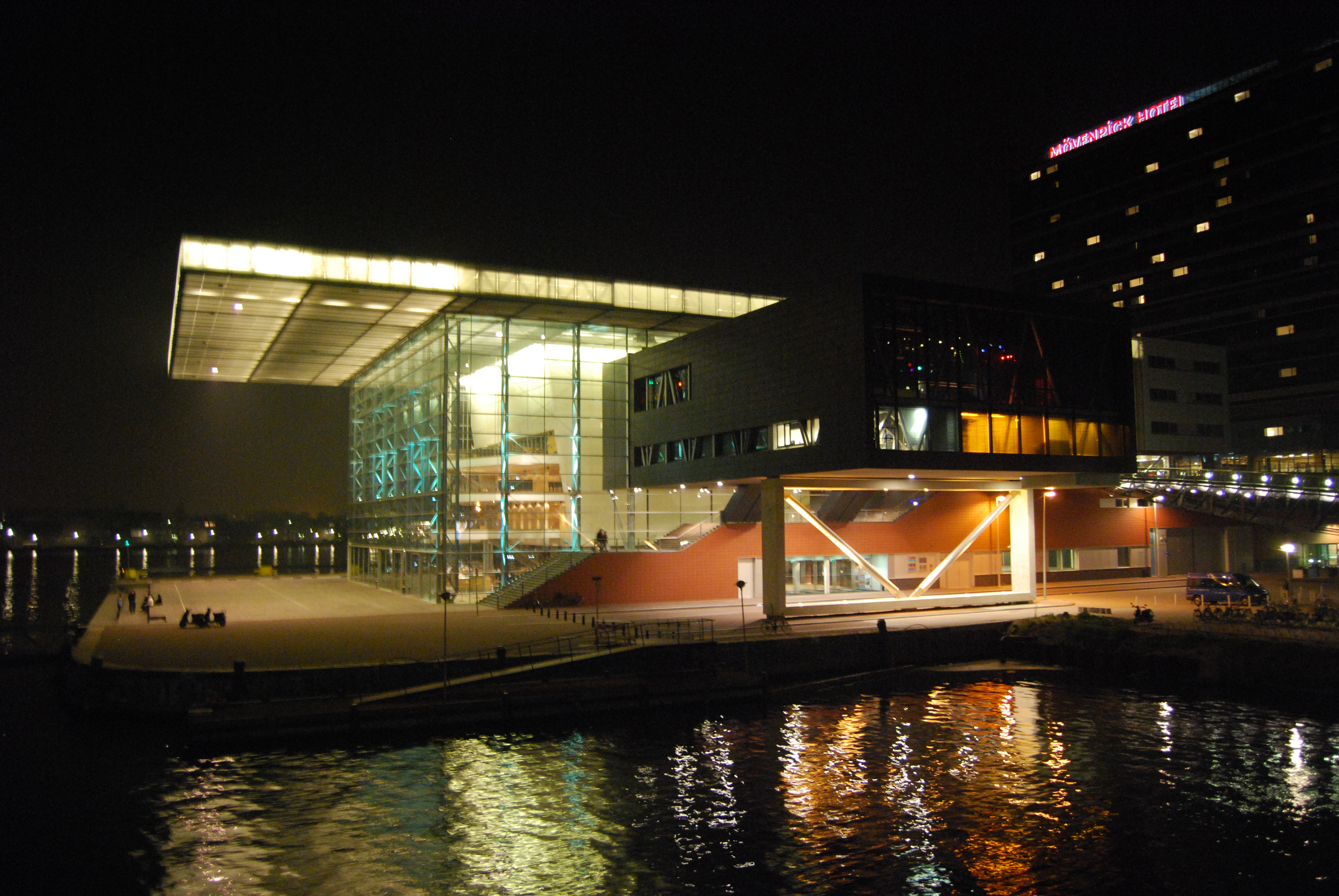
Muziekgebouw aan 't IJ, where Glanz was premiered

Glanz (Brilliance), for oboe, clarinet, bassoon, trumpet, trombone, tuba, and viola. 2007 (ca. 40 mins.). Work number 90. The specified colour is HKS 69 (sulphur green).

Glanz was the first of the Klang trios to be commissioned, and so was the first to be composed after Schönheit, completed on 24 May 2007. It was given its premiere in the Muziekgebouw aan 't IJ, Amsterdam, on 19 June 2008 by members of the Asko Ensemble, with Kathinka Pasveer as sound-projectionist.

Originally intended as a trio for clarinet, bassoon, and viola, Stockhausen was persuaded by the Holland Festival management to add four more instruments to the ensemble. The original trio remains as the main structure, but four inserts interrupt as "magic moments", in which other instruments engage in dialogue with the trio: the first is an imperious solo oboe, the second a stentorian trumpet-trombone duo, and the last a somnolent tuba. The third insert, on the other hand, is self-reflective, performed by the core trio and including, like the Seventh Hour, the spoken Latin words "Gloria in excelsis Deo et in terra pax in hominibus bonae voluntatis".

In the score, Stockhausen specified that the work should be performed with a "light sculpture" in the middle of the stage, and this sculpture should gradually become more brilliant. For the world premiere in Amsterdam, a pyramidal sculpture was designed by the lighting technician Maarten Warmerdam, which was made to increase in brightness over the course of the performance. One critic has described it as "a cheesy 4-foot pyramid".

== Eleventh Hour: Treue ==
Treue (Fidelity), for E♭ clarinet, basset horn, and bass clarinet. 2007 (ca. 30 mins.). Work number 91. The specified colour is HKS 2 (zinc yellow [Zinkgelb]).

Treue received its premiere on 8 May 2010 at the KOMED-Saal of Mediapark 7, Cologne, by Roberta Gottardi (E♭ clarinet), Rumi Sota-Klemm (basset horn), and Petra Stump (bass clarinet), as part of the MusikTriennale Köln. The MusikTriennale Köln commissioned the premiere with the support of the Kunst-Stiftung NRW.

Treue permutes the five Schönheit sections in the order 5 3 1 4 2 and adds a Schluß (coda) for the E♭ clarinet alone, which is essentially the same as the first cor-anglais solo from Balance.

The brief spoken text in this trio is "Treue zu Gott" (Fidelity to God).

== Twelfth Hour: Erwachen ==
Erwachen (Awakening), for soprano saxophone, trumpet, and cello. 2007 (ca. 30 mins.). Work number 92. The specified colour is HKS 3 (bright yellow [Verkehrsgelb]).

Erwachen was premiered in Brussels on 13 October 2009 by members of musikFabrik: Marcus Weiss (saxophone), Marco Blaauw (trumpet), and Dirk Wietheger (cello).

The five sections from Schönheit occur here in the order 2 4 3 1 5, and there is an added Anfang (beginning) adapted from the Glanz coda. Just before the fourth main section of this trio the performers speak in unison the words "Erwachen in Gott" (Awakening in God).

== Thirteenth Hour: Cosmic Pulses ==
Cosmic Pulses, electronic music (8-track-tape, loudspeaker pairs, mixing desk / sound director) 2006–2007 (32 mins., 05 secs.). Work number 93. The specified colour is HKS 4 (yellow).

Cosmic Pulses was commissioned by Massimo Simonini, artistic director of the Angelica festival in Bologna, in conjunction with the Dissonanze Electronic Music Festival in Rome, where it was premiered on 7 May 2007 at Auditorium Parco della Musica, Sala Sinopoli. The German premiere took place later in the same year, on Friday, 13 July 2007, at the Stockhausen Courses in Kürten. The title of the work may be related to a composition written as "a kind of homage" to Stockhausen, titled Pulsares, by the Brazilian composer Flo Menezes, who had sent a DVD recording of it to Stockhausen in late 2005. Written 1998–2000 for solo piano, orchestra, quadraphonic electronic sounds and live electronics, Pulsares, like Cosmic Pulses, is particularly concerned with rotating spatial sounds.

When Stockhausen began composing the work on 16 August 2006, it was to have been the Sixth Hour of Klang and was titled in the singular: Cosmic Pulse. At that point, the Fifth Hour was given the title Akkorde and was intended to include not only the three solos that would later be renamed Harmonien, but also the trio that would become Schönheit. At some later point in time before the premiere, Stockhausen reassigned the work to Hour Thirteen, in order to open up Hours 6–12 for the additional trios from Balance to Erwachen.

The electronic realisation was carried out by Joachim Haas and Gregorio Karman at the Experimentalstudio des SWR in Freiburg between December 2006 and April 2007, with spatialisation accomplished at Stockhausen's studio in Kürten between 25 and 31 April [sic] 2007. (A second-hand source, quotes García Karman as saying it was between 25 and 31 March, rather than April.)

The music is made from 24 melodic loops, each with a different number of pitches (from 1 to 24) and in a different tempo, calculated in sequences of eight pulses lasting between 1.17 and 240 per minute. This means the slowest tempo is 1.17 x 8 = 9.36 pulses per minute, and the fastest is 240 x 8 = 1920 pulses per minute. These loops, with a total pitch span of about seven octaves, were created and synchronized by Antonio Pérez Abellán. The loops enter successively from low to high and from slow to fast, and make their exits in the same order. Kathinka Pasveer "enlivened" the rhythms and pitches by hand, according to the composer's instructions, causing accelerandos and ritardandos around each basic tempo, and glissandos upwards and downwards around the melodic pitch successions. The music therefore begins and ends with relatively clear polyphony of the loops, but in the central part this dissolves into a statistical mass of sound in which only general shifts of texture and colour can be perceived.

In addition to all this, with the collaboration of Joachim Haas and Gregorio Karman of the Experimental Studio for Acoustic Art in Freiburg, Stockhausen spatialized each of the 24 layers in eight-channel sound, with a total of 241 different trajectories in space "as if I had to compose the orbits of 24 moons or 24 planets. ... If it is possible to hear everything I do not yet know—it depends on how often one can experience an 8-channel performance. In any case, the experiment is extremely fascinating". This was accomplished with a system based on a device called an OKTEG (Octophonic Effect Generator), using a Max/MSP patch implementing eight variable-law amplitude-panning modules driven by separate sequencers, each with its own tempo control. It was specially developed at the Experimental Studio to manage real-time panning of eight simultaneous layers, and was coupled with a Digital Audio Workstation controlling layer playback, trajectory recording and mixing tasks.

Cosmic Pulses is an exploration of the frontiers between the perceptual realms of pitch and rhythm—visited previously by Stockhausen in Kontakte (1958–60)—in which pitches descend below the threshold of pitch perception to become periodic rhythms, and periodic are transformed into audible pitches. It also probes the borders between spatial movement and timbre.

After the completion of Cosmic Pulses, Stockhausen requested a further step from the technicians at the Experimental Studio. He wanted the automation levels of the individual layers to be neutralized while at the same time retaining the original spatialization, for use in the production of further electronic materials for the following eight pieces in the cycle. Each of the subsequent pieces in the cycle use three of the twenty-four melodic layers from Cosmic Pulses as the accompaniment for a slower-moving solo part. Four of these solos are vocal (hours 14, 15, 18, and 19), and four are for wind instruments (hours 16, 17, 20, and 21).

== Fourteenth Hour: Havona ==
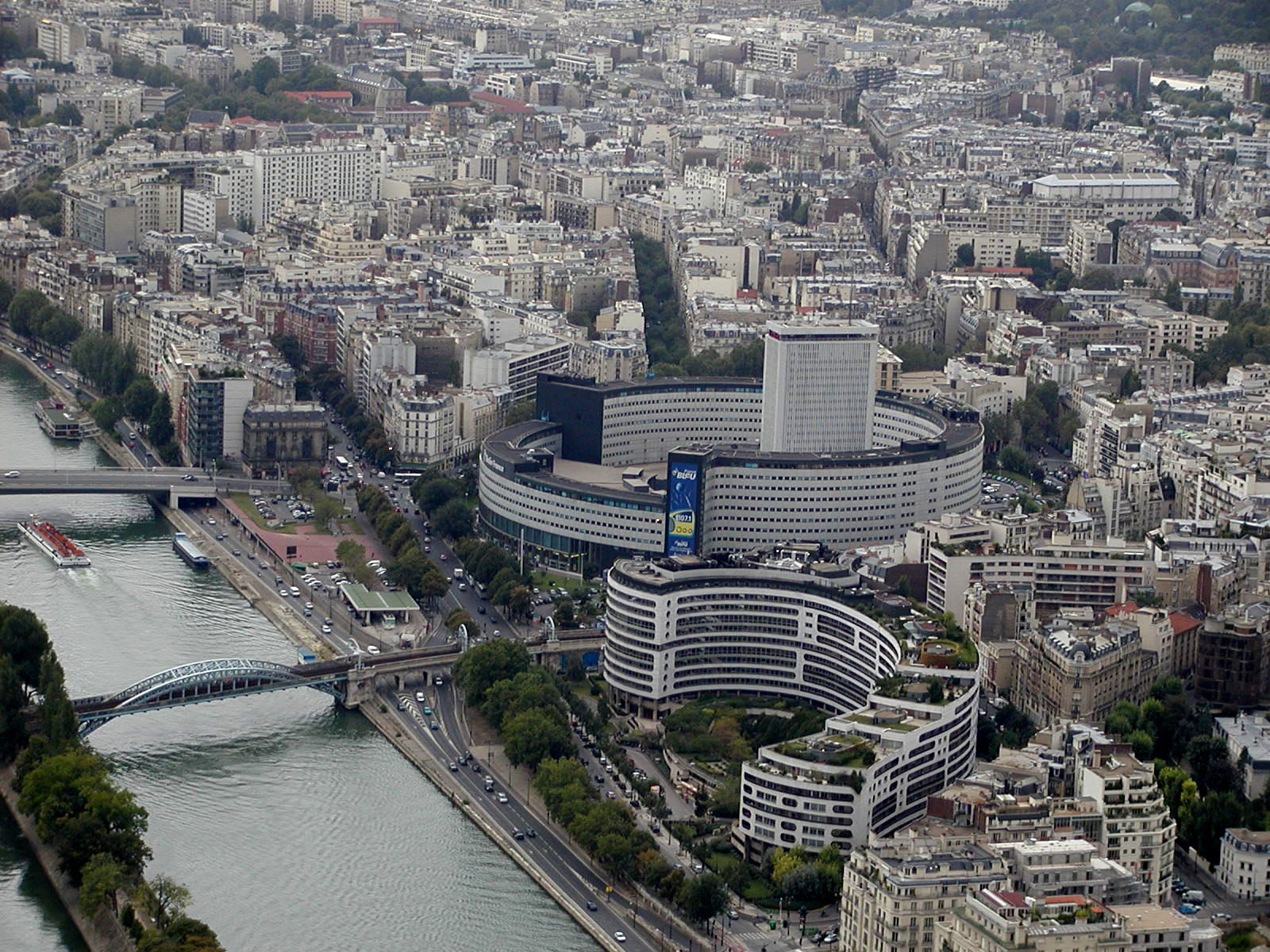
Maison de la Radio France, Paris, where the Fourteenth Hour was premiered, in the Salle Olivier Messiaen, 10 January 2009

Havona, for bass and electronic music (layers 24, 23, 22 from Cosmic Pulses) 2007 (25 mins., 10 secs.). Work number 94. The specified colour is HKS 5 (melon yellow).

The premiere took place in the Salle de Concert Olivier Messiaen of Radio France in Paris, on 10 January 2009, performed by Nicholas Isherwood (bass) and Gérard Pape (sound projection), as part of the Saison Musicale Multiphonies. It was commissioned by the Group de Recherches Musicales (GRM) of the Institut National de l'Audiovisuel (INA).

The titles of Hours 14–21 are all place names in the Urantia Book, and all are named in the text of Havona, as stages in a journey with the goal of studying cosmic music in Paradise. However, this text, like those for the following Hours, is not taken directly from the Urantia Book, but was written by the composer.

In the Urantia Book, Havona is "the central universe, ... an existential, perfect, and replete universe surrounding the home of the eternal Deities, the center of all things".

This central planetary family ... is far-distant from the local universe of Nebadon. It is of enormous dimensions and almost unbelievable mass and consists of one billion spheres of unimagined beauty and superb grandeur ... arranged in seven concentric circuits immediately surrounding the three circuits of Paradise satellites. There are upwards of thirty-five million worlds in the innermost Havona circuit and over two hundred and forty-five million in the outermost, with proportionate numbers intervening

According to the Urantia Book, "Harmony is the speech of Havona", and music is the eternal, universal language of men, angels, and spirits.

== Fifteenth Hour: Orvonton ==
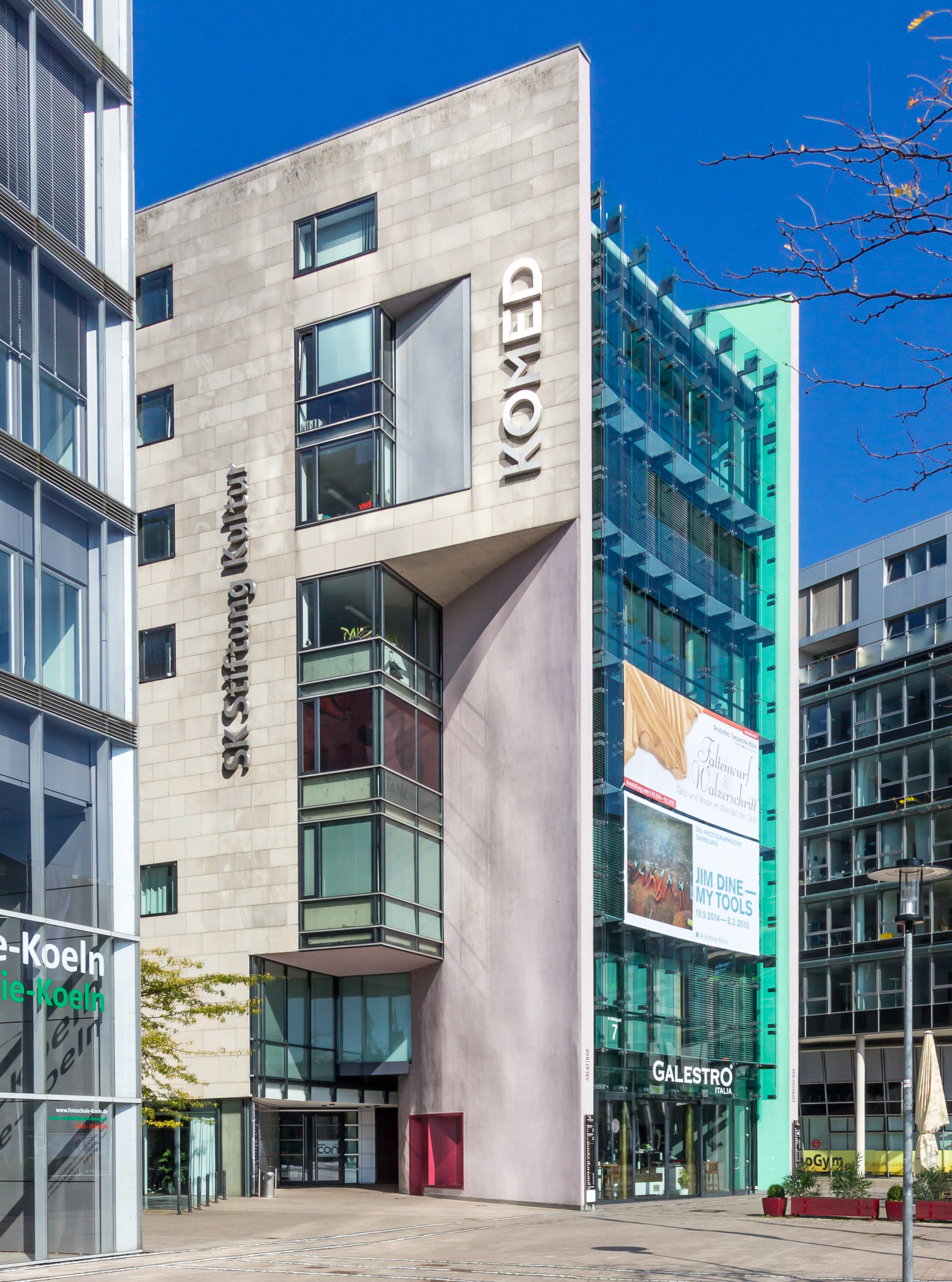
Mediapark 7 building, Cologne. The Eleventh and Fifteenth Hours were premiered here on 8 May 2010, in the KOMED-Saal.

Orvonton, for baritone and electronic music (layers 21, 20, 19 from Cosmic Pulses) 2007 (24 mins.). Work number 95. The specified colour is HKS 6 (yellow-orange).

Orvonton was premiered on 8 May 2010 at the KOMED-Saal in Mediapark 7 in Cologne by Jonathan de la Paz Zaens, with sound direction by Hannah Weirich, as part of the MusikTriennale Köln.

According to the Urantia Book, "outside Havona there are just seven inhabited universes, the seven superuniverses", and the Earth's (Urantia) "local universe of Nebadon belongs to Orvonton, the seventh superuniverse".

In September 2007, when composition of Hours 14 to 21 was substantially completed, Stockhausen explained in an interview: "in the new works which I am now composing in Klang, I very often describe, in the sung text, how the piece that you are hearing is composed—and in fact right down to the details: how the rhythm goes, how the melody goes, how the harmony goes. So I very much love the fact that the music explains itself". Stockhausen composed Orvonton with de la Paz Zaens' voice in mind, and the composer assigned to him its extraordinarily long text (56 lines) because of the clarity of his German diction. The text provides "an analysis of the material and structure of the piece itself, and is also meant humorously": "Orvonton: I am a baritone, ... / Layer nineteen has twenty-three tones as sound loop. / In the basic tempo 3.75 each note lasts 2 seconds, / and therefore the loop lasts 23 x 2 = 46 seconds", and so on. Later on, this text includes an artistic credo: Each sound is a universe. / But one cannot tell if it is beautiful by the numbers: / that depends on who is counting. / Four hundred and forty Hertz is neither beautiful nor ugly. / Beauty lives. / ... / Art music is not honky-tonk [i.e., low music-hall entertainment], / its number games need moments every now and then for the soul, / that touch, astonish: / time stands still".

== Sixteenth Hour: Uversa ==
Uversa, for basset horn and electronic music (layers 18, 17, 16 from Cosmic Pulses) 2007 (22 mins., 40 secs.). Work number 96. The specified colour is HKS 7, orange.

Uversa was premiered by Michele Marelli, basset horn, with sound direction by Florian Zwißler, on 8 May 2010 at the Domforum in Cologne, as part of the MusikTriennale Köln. The premiere was commissioned by the MusikTriennale Köln, with the support of the Kunststiftung NRW.

Uversa is the headquarters of the superuniverse of Orvonton.

The sections of this and the other instrumental solos with electronic music are articulated by lines of spoken text in German, written by Stockhausen and loosely based on the Urantia Book. These were spoken by Kathinka Pasveer, recorded, and mixed with the electronic music on the eight-channel tape. The concluding portion refers to the learning of art by pilgrims to Uversa:.

bright and morning stars of UVERSA
brilliant evening stars
UVERSA'S archangels
divine counselors
celestial overseers
mansion world teachers
UVERSA'S star-student art
celestial artisans in UVERSA for the entire super-universe
student visitors
ascending pilgrims
ascending mortals
to UVERSA

== Seventeenth Hour: Nebadon ==
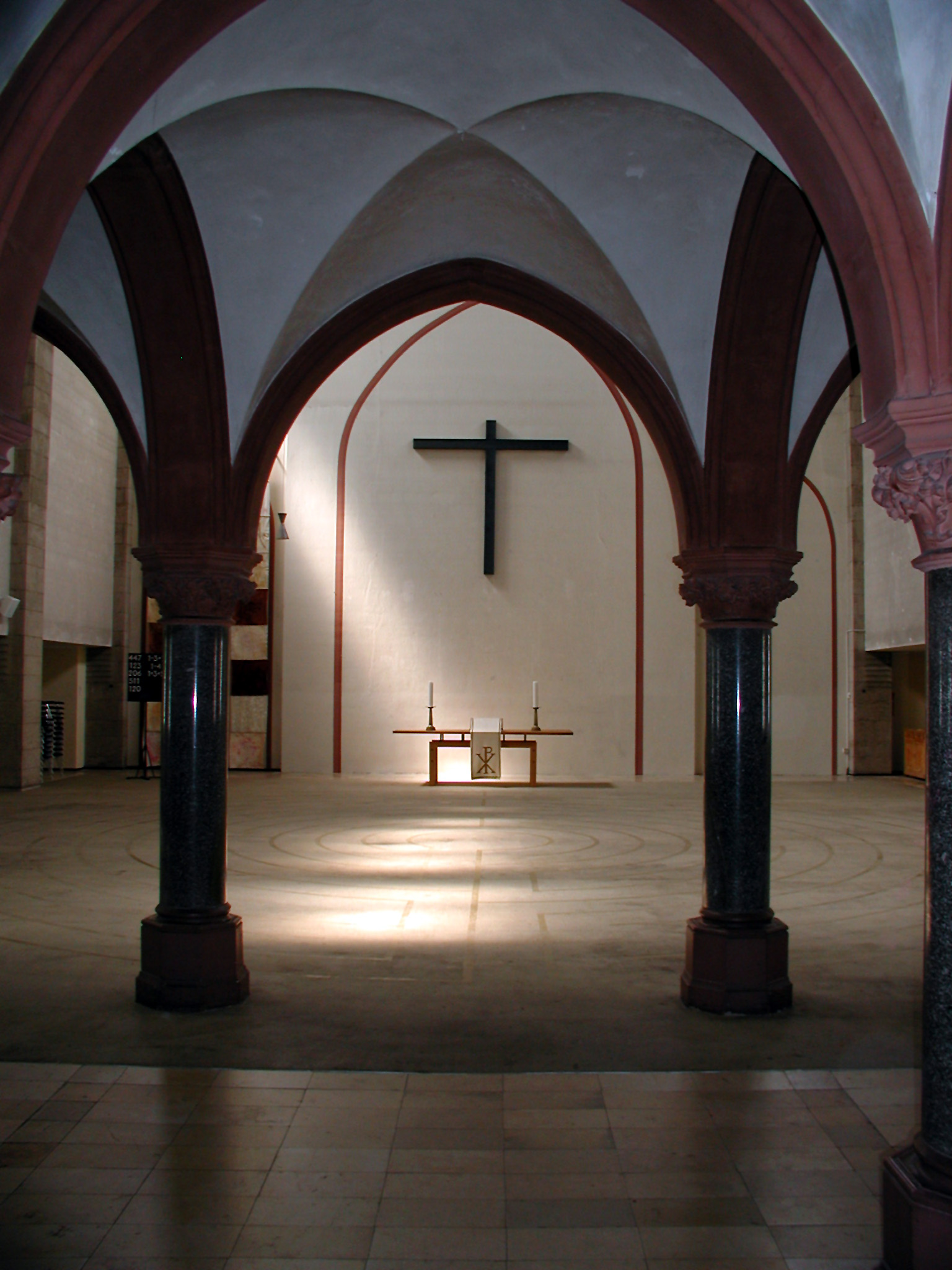
Interior of the Christuskirche in Cologne, where both the Seventeenth and Eighteenth Hours were premiered in May 2010

Nebadon, for horn and electronic music (layers 15, 14, 13 from Cosmic Pulses) 2007 (21 mins., 40 secs.). Work number 97. The specified colour is HKS 10 (red-orange).

Nebadon was given its premiere on 8 May 2010 by Christine Chapman, horn, and Hannah Weirich, sound direction, at the Christuskirche in Cologne, as part of the MusikTriennale Köln.

Nebadon is the local universe to which the earth (Urantia) belongs.

Each of Nebadon's 24 sections is announced by a word or phrase written into the score by Stockhausen. These mostly isolated words, in a mixture of English and German, begin to form a connected narrative in the last seven lines (original in German):

ten million inhabited worlds
in the superuniverse
ORVONTON
and central universe
HAVONA
rotates around SAGITTARIUS
holy NEBADON

This text was recorded and mixed into the electronic music by Kathinka Pasveer. The horn is amplified and projected during a performance over all eight loudspeaker groups, which surround the audience in a circle. The solo part is notated flexibly, in order to allow the performer great freedom in forming groups, notes, and figures.

== Eighteenth Hour: Jerusem ==
Jerusem, for tenor and electronic music (layers 12, 11, 10 from Cosmic Pulses) 2007 (20 mins., 40 secs.) Work number 98. The specified colour is HKS 22 (orange-red).

Hubert Mayer, tenor, and Melvyn Poore, sound direction, gave the world premiere of Jerusem on 8 May 2010 at the Christuskirche in Cologne by, as part of the MusikTriennale Köln. Jerusem is a planet, the headquarters of the cluster of 57 major and minor satellites constituting the administrative centre of the local system called Satania, which forms part of the local universe Nebadon. "Music, such as Urantia mortals understand, attains its highest expression in the schools of Jerusem".

The Urantia Book's description is reflected in the very short text for Jerusem (the words are repeated frequently), written by the composer:

Universes
GOD's schools
JERUSEM
without end
joy to learn
marvel
thank
help
HIM

== Nineteenth Hour: Urantia ==
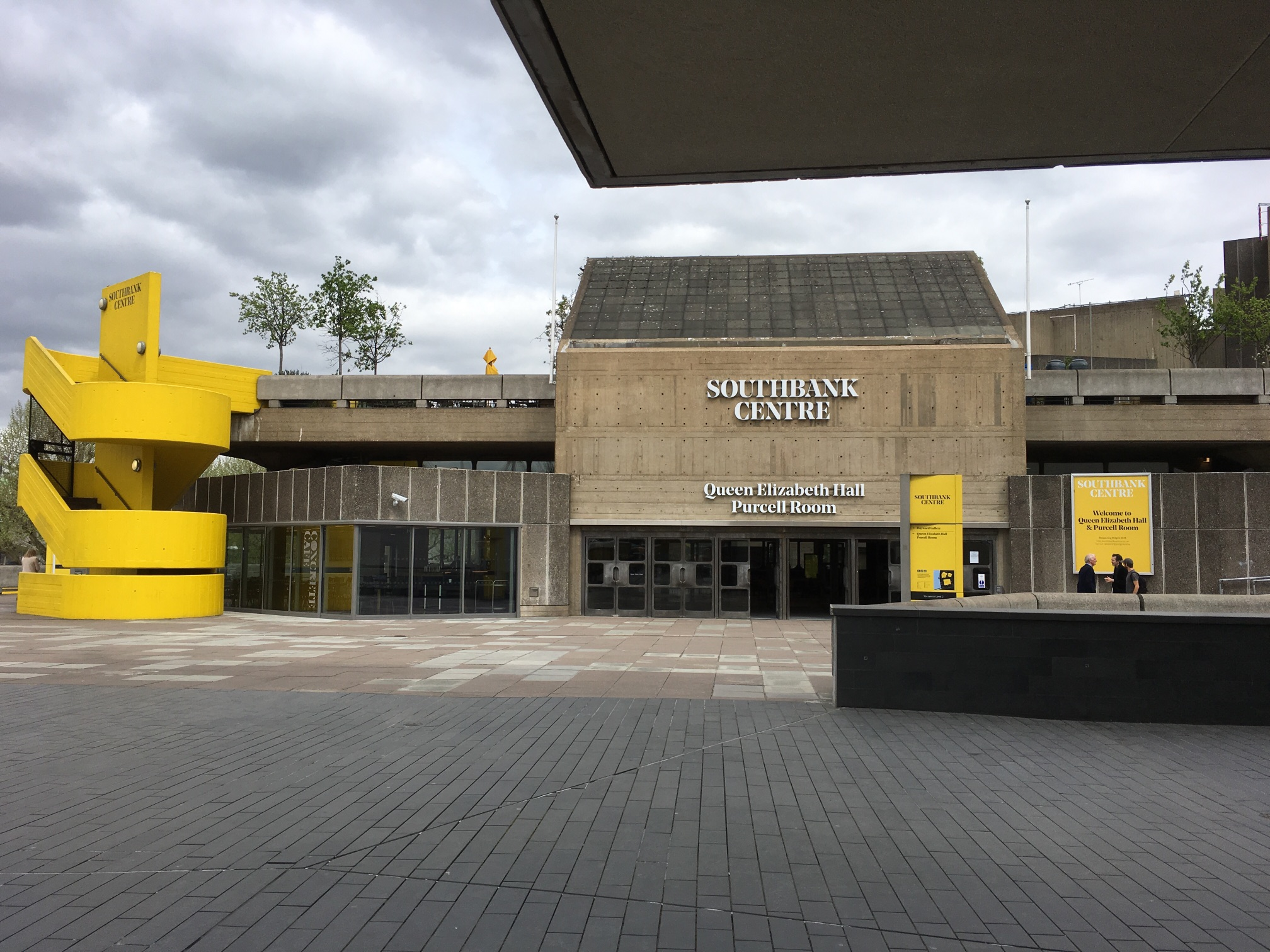
Queen Elizabeth Hall where Urantia was premiered in 2008

Urantia, for soprano (live or prerecorded) and electronic music (layers 9, 8, 7 from Cosmic Pulses) 2007 (19 mins., 40 secs.). Work number 99. The specified colour is HKS 23 (fire-engine red [Verkehrsrot]).

The manuscript score of Urantia is dated 21 February 2007, making it very likely the first of the Klang solo pieces with electronics to have been completed. It was premiered in the Queen Elizabeth Hall at the Southbank Centre, London, on 8 November 2008, by Kathinka Pasveer, soprano (prerecorded) and sound projection.

Urantia is the name given to our earth in the Urantia Book, "commonly referred to as 606 of Satania in Norlatiadek of Nebadon, meaning the six hundred sixth inhabited world in the local system of Satania, situated in the constellation of Norlatiadek, one of the one hundred constellations of the local universe of Nebadon".

The three layers of electronic music—which rotates in different orbits around the hall, projected in eight channels—are moderately high in pitch and contain amongst the highest number of notes of all of the layers from Cosmic Pulses: 20, 21 and 22 notes. The solo part, by contrast, is one of the simplest of this section of Klang. The German text, written by the composer, has only 26 syllables, and introduces just one new syllable in each of the work's 26 sections:

Rotations everywhere
URANTIA in the cosmos
Father, Son and Holy Ghost
GOD GOD GOD

== Twentieth Hour: Edentia ==
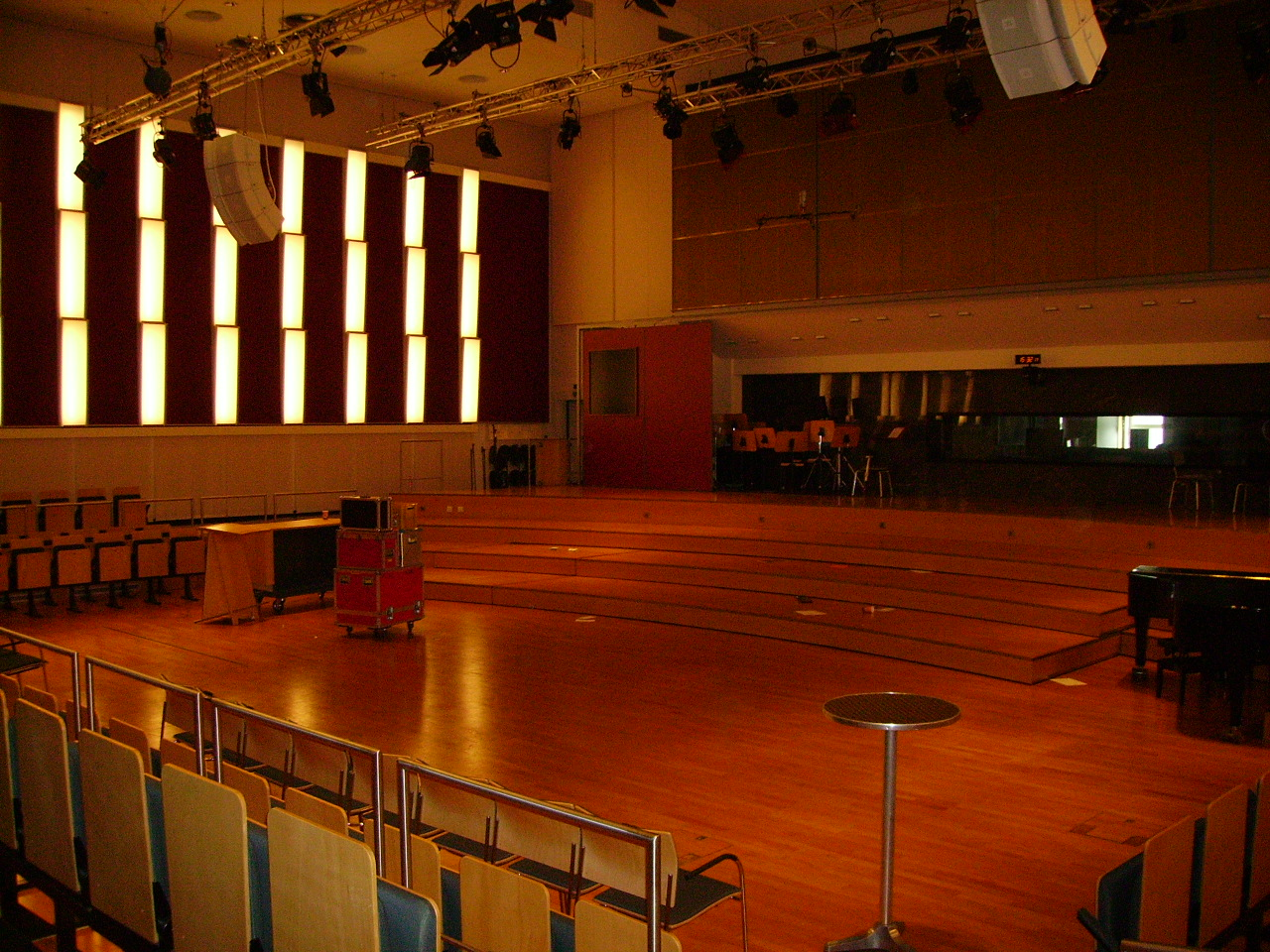
Rolf-Liebermann-Studio at the NDR in Hamburg, where Edentia was premiered in 2008

Edentia, for soprano saxophone and electronic music (layers 6, 5, 4 from Cosmic Pulses) 2007 (18 mins., 40 secs.). Work number 100. The specified colour is HKS 25 (Telemagenta).

Edentia was premiered at the Rolf-Liebermann-Studio K-75 of the NDR in Hamburg on 6 August 2008 by Marcus Weiss, saxophone.

Edentia is described in the Urantia Book as a planet, the centremost and largest of a cluster of 771 "architectural spheres" in the constellation of Norlatiadek, within the local universe of Nebadon. "There is harmony of music and euphony of expression in the orations of Salvington and Edentia which are inspiring beyond description".

The saxophonist, who must play from memory, is amplified using a transmitter and receiver, and in some sections uses a reverberation unit with both long and extremely long reverberation times. The 24 sections of Edentia are articulated with texts written by the composer. These texts, recorded and mixed into the electronic music, at first describe the Edentia of the Urantia Book, and then announce the musical devices being used in the later sections: "trills", "repetitions", "tremoli", "micro-intervals", etc..

== Twenty-first Hour: Paradies ==
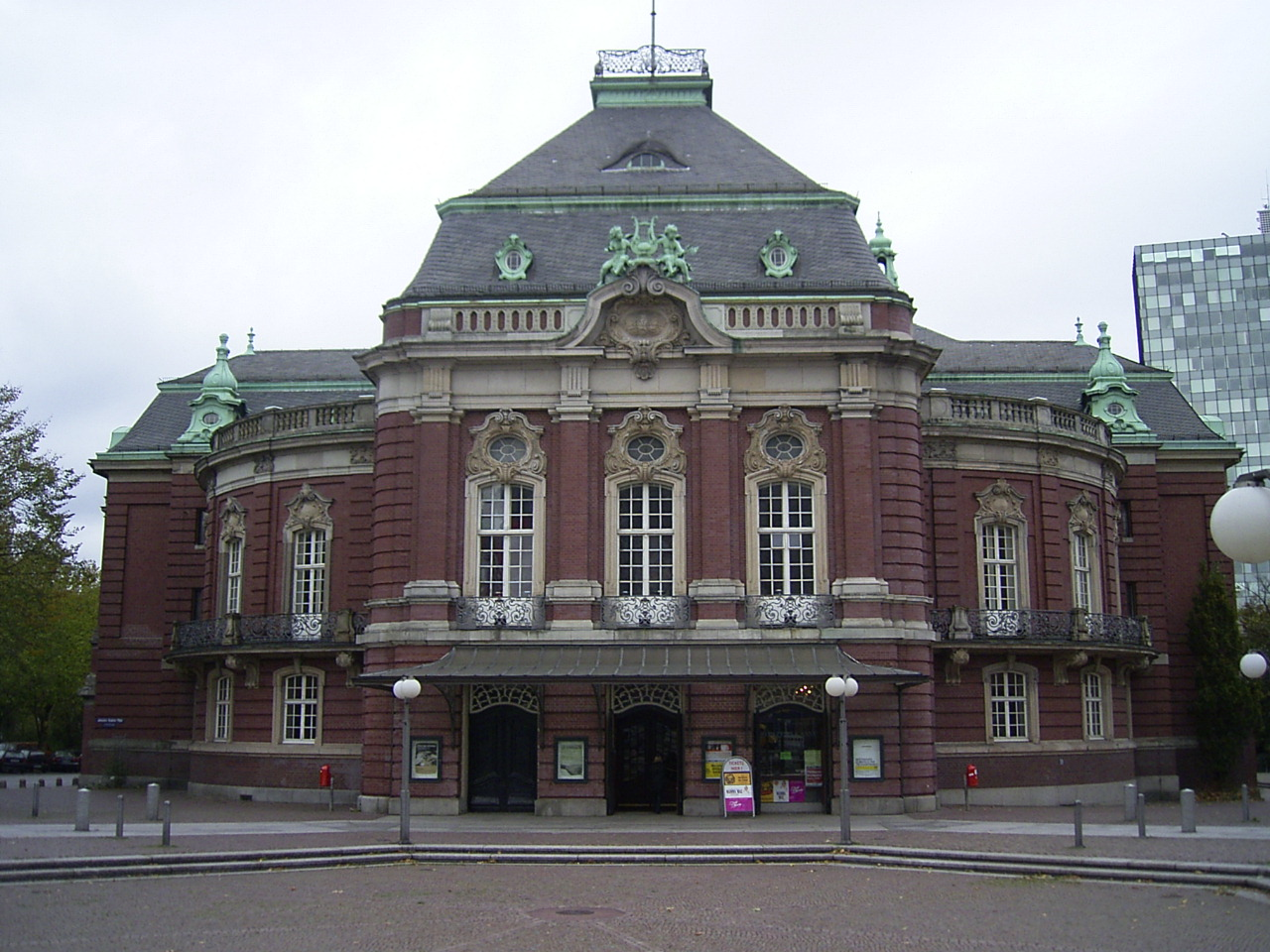
Laeiszhalle, Hamburg, where Paradies was premiered in 2009

Paradies (Paradise), for flute and electronic music (layers 3, 2, 1 from Cosmic Pulses) 2007 (18 mins., 02 secs.). Work number 101. The specified colour is HKS 31 (purple).

Paradies was premiered by Kathinka Pasveer, flute, and Bryan Wolf, sound direction, at the Schleswig-Holstein Musik Festival, at the Laeiszhalle in Hamburg on 24 August 2009 . Paradies was commissioned by the North German Radio (NDR), Hamburg.

According to the Urantia Book, "Paradise is the gigantic nuclear Isle of absolute stability which rests motionless at the very heart of the magnificent eternal universe".

As with the preceding pieces, Paradies has a text describing itself. In this case, it is spoken by Kathinka Pasveer on the tape, mixed with the electronic music. The 25 short lines articulate the 24 musical sections of the work. As in Orvonton, after announcing the piece in the first seven lines, the German words from section 8 onward analyse the stages of the work itself: "24 lines of notes for the flute / from 1 to 24 pitches / of the original row / source of all melodies / each line, a different low note / fragments of the groups / jumps in the entire space / fitting dynamics / articulation free / legato or staccato / pauses ad libitum / flexible tempo / one insert per line / for the fantasy / and the play / and the joy / for the magic / the eternal GOD".

== Discography ==
- Himmelfahrt, für Synthesizer, Sopran und Tenor: 1. Stunde aus Klang. Antonio Pérez Abellán, synthesizer; Barbara Zanichelli, soprano; Hubert Mayer, tenor; Karlheinz Stockhausen, musical direction and sound projection. Additionally includes an explanation read by Stockhausen of the timbres by in German and English, and timbre examples played by Antonio Pérez Abellán. Stockhausen Complete Edition CD 83. Kürten: Stockhausen-Verlag, 2006.
- Freude, für 2 Harfen: 2. Stunde aus Klang. Marianne Smit and Esther Kooi, harps; Karlheinz Stockhausen, musical direction and sound projection. Stockhausen Complete Edition CD 84. Kürten: Stockhausen-Verlag, 2006.
- Natürliche Dauern, für Klavier: 3. Stunde aus Klang. Frank Gutschmidt (nos. 1, 3, 5, 7, 10, 13, 14), Benjamin Kobler (nos. 2, 4, 6, 8, 9, 11, 12, 15), and Antonio Pérez Abellán (nos. 16–24), piano; Karlheinz Stockhausen, musical direction and sound projection. Stockhausen Complete Edition 2-CD set 85A&B. Kürten: Stockhausen-Verlag, 2007.
- Karlheinz Stockhausen: Natürliche Dauern—3. Stünde aus Klang/Natural Durations—3rd Hour from Klang. Udo Falkner, piano. Recorded in the Rudolf-Oetker-Halle, Bielefeld, 20–23 March 2011. 2-CD set. Telos TLS 130. [Germany]: Telos Music UG, 2013.
- Marino Formenti: Notturni "... was sie die Welt nannten ...". Karlheinz Stockhausen: 5. Natürliche Dauern (from Klang, Third Hour) and Klavierstück V, with works by Ferneyhough, Benjamin, Cerha, and Cage. Marino Formenti, piano. CD recording. Col Legno 20406. [Germany]: Col Legno, 2013.
- Liszt Inspections. Marino Formenti, piano. 5. Natürliche Dauern (from Klang, Third Hour). Recorded at the Siemensvilla, Berlin Lankwitz. With works by Liszt, Berio, Rihm, Feldman, Adams, Sciarrino, Murail, Ligeti, Ustvolskaya, Weill, Cerha, and Pesson. Kairos 13292. Released 2015.
- Himmels-Tür: 4. Stunde aus Klang and 24 Türin (German and English versions). Stuart Gerber, percussion; Karlheinz Stockhausen, musical direction, voice and realisation of Türin. Stockhausen Complete Edition CD 86. Kürten: Stockhausen-Verlag, 2006.
- Harmonien für Baßklarinette, Harmonien für Flöte, Harmonien für Trompete: 5. Stunde aus Klang; Schönheit für Baßklarinette, Flöte, und Trompete: 6. Stunde aus Klang. Suzanne Stephens, bass clarinet; Kathinka Pasveer, flute; Marco Blaauw, trumpet. Stockhausen Complete Edition CD 87. Kürten: Stockhausen-Verlag, 2010.
- Transformations. Includes Harmonien (bass-clarinet version) arranged for tuba. Alan Tindall, tuba. Bridge 9471. New Rochelle, New York: Bridge Records, 2016.
- Balance und Glück: 7. Stunde und 8. Stunde aus Klang. Ensemble recherche: Martin Fahlenbock, flute; Jaime González, cor anglais; Shizuyo Oka, bass clarinet. MusikFabrik: Peter Veale, oboe; Piet van Bockstal, cor anglais; Edurne Santos, bassoon. Stockhausen Complete Edition CD 88. Kürten: Stockhausen-Verlag, 2010.
- Hoffnung und Glanz: 9. Stunde und 10. Stunde aus Klang. Members of musikFabrik: Juditha Haeberlin (violin), Axel Porath (viola), Dirk Wietheger (cello) in Hoffnung; Peter Veale (oboe), Richard Haynes (clarinet), Heidi Mockert (bassoon), Marco Blaauw (trumpet), Bruce Collings (trombone), Melvyn Poore (tuba), and Axel Porath (viola) in Glanz. Stockhausen Complete Edition CD 89. Kürten: Stockhausen-Verlag, 2011.
- Treue und Erwachen: 11. Stunde und 12. Stunde aus Klang. Roberta Gottardi (E♭ clarinet), Rumi Sota-Klemm (basset horn), and Petra Stump (bass clarinet); Marcus Weiss (saxophone), Marco Blaauw (trumpet), and Dirk Wietheger (cello). Stockhausen Complete Edition CD 90. Kürten: Stockhausen-Verlag, 2010.
- Cosmic Pulses: 13. Stunde aus Klang (and the opening of each of the 24 layers, for study purposes). Electronic music. Stockhausen Complete Edition CD 91. Kürten: Stockhausen-Verlag, 2007.
- Havona, für Bass und elektronische Musik: 14. Stunde aus Klang (and electronic music alone, for rehearsals). Nicholas Isherwood, bass. Stockhausen Complete Edition CD 92. Kürten: Stockhausen-Verlag, 2009.
- Orvonton: 15. Stunde aus Klang, für Bariton und elektronische Musik (and electronic music alone, for rehearsals). Jonathan de la Paz Zaens, baritone. Stockhausen Complete Edition CD 93. Kürten: Stockhausen-Verlag, 2010.
- Uversa: 16. Stunde aus Klang, für Bassetthorn und elektronische Musik (and electronic music alone, for rehearsals). Michele Marelli, basset horn. Stockhausen Complete Edition CD 94. Kürten: Stockhausen-Verlag, 2010.
- Nebadon: 17. Stunde aus Klang, für Horn und Elektronische Musik (and electronic music alone, for rehearsals). Christine Chapman, horn. Stockhausen Complete Edition CD 95. Kürten: Stockhausen-Verlag, 2010.
- Jerusem: 18. Stunde aus Klang, für Tenor und Elektronische Musik (and electronic music alone, for rehearsals). Hubert Mayer, tenor. Stockhausen Complete Edition CD 96. Kürten: Stockhausen-Verlag, 2010.
- Urantia, für Sopran und elektronische Musik: 19. Stunde aus Klang (and electronic music alone, for rehearsals). Kathinka Pasveer, soprano. Stockhausen Complete Edition CD 97. Kürten: Stockhausen-Verlag, 2008.
- Edentia, für Sopransaxophon und elektronische Musik: 20. Stunde aus Klang (and electronic music alone, for rehearsals). Marcus Weiss, saxophone. Stockhausen Complete Edition CD 98. Kürten: Stockhausen-Verlag, 2008.
- Paradies, für Flöte und elektronische Musik: 21. Stunde aus Klang (and electronic music alone, for rehearsals). Kathinka Pasveer, flute. Stockhausen Complete Edition CD 99. Kürten: Stockhausen-Verlag, 2009.
