= Marianne Smit =

Dutch harpist

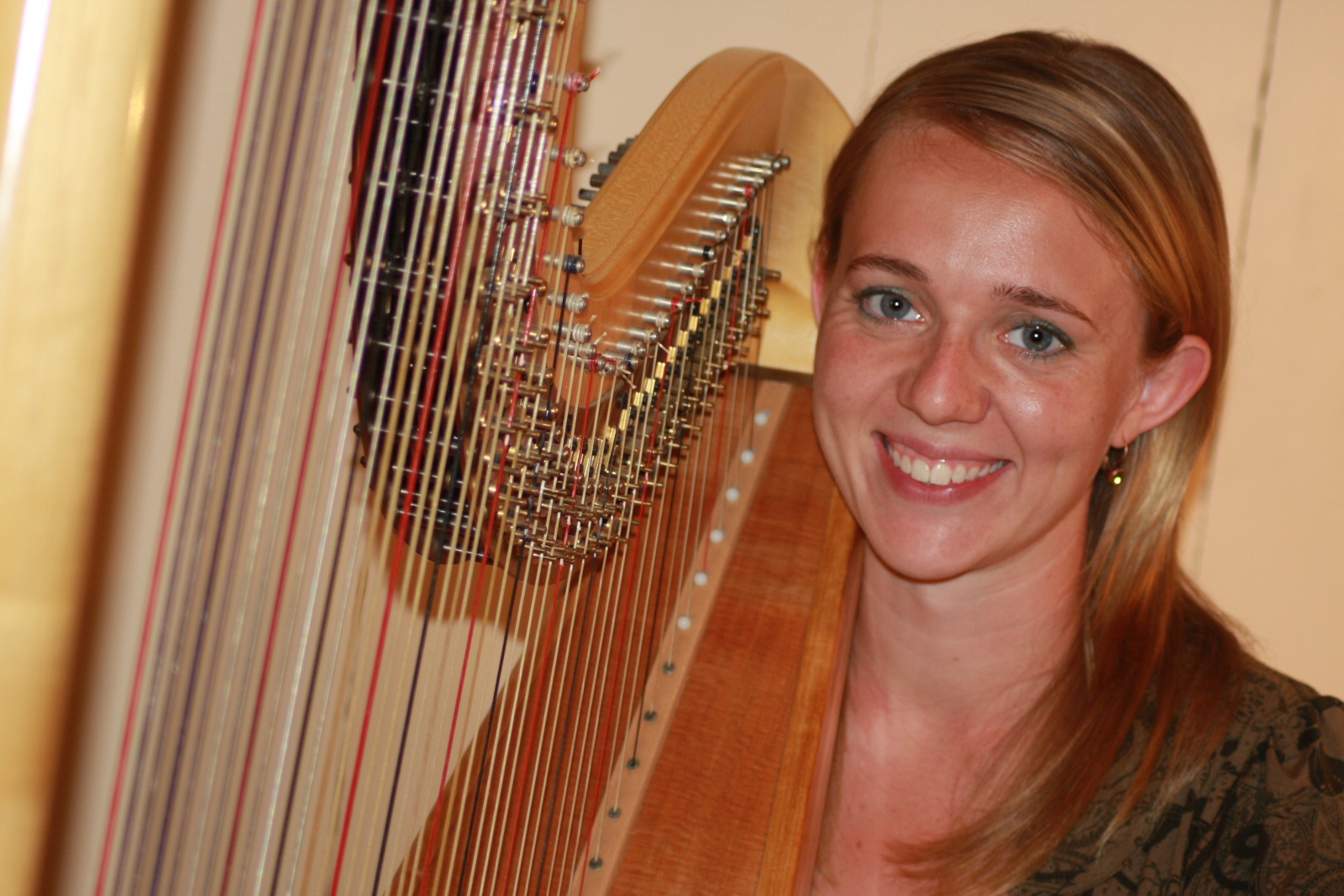
- Marianne Smit in 2009

Background information
- Born: Netherlands
- Genres: Classical
- Occupation: Harpist
- Instrument: Harp
- Website: https://mariannesmit.com/EN/

Marianne Smit (born 1984) is a Dutch harpist.

== Biography ==
Marianne Smit started playing the harp in 1995 when she was nine years old. Initially she was taught by her mother Gertru Smit-Pasveer, the sister of flutist Kathinka Pasveer. After one year she became student of Anke Anderson.

She was among the first to be entered into the Young Talent department of the Amsterdam Conservatory in 1998, where she received the guidance of Erika Waardenburg.

Her aunt's close associate Karlheinz Stockhausen composed a harp duet for Smit and Esther Kooi, Freude, which premiered on June 7, 2006 in the Milan Cathedral. They continued to perform it at many venues including the Concertgebouw in Amsterdam in 2007, and the Queen Elizabeth Hall in London in 2008. More recently she has performed Freude with Miriam Overlach.

Marianne Smit passed her Bachelor's exam cum laude in June 2007 with an honour for “special artisticity in the field of contemporary music”.

Smit has participated in audition training with Petra van der Heide, a harpist with the Royal Concertgebouw Orchestra. In this course she won the first prize which earned her a spot on the orchestra in two of their concerts. She has participated several times in productions of the Dutch Radio Philharmonic Orchestra.

== CD recordings ==
- Karlheinz Stockhausen - Freude für 2 Harfen, 2. Stunde aus Klang (Die 24 Stunden des Tages), Marianne Smit and Esther Kooi (2006)
- Strings Attached, Dutch Youth String Orchestra, conductor Johannes Leertouwer, with Marianne Smit and Giselle Boeters in Concertino in an Old Style by Maciej Malecki (2007)

== Awards ==
- Prinses Christina Concours: 1st prize 1998 & 2002
- SJMN Musictalent Concours: 1st prize 1998, 2002 & 2004
- Dutch National Harpconcours: Finalist 2000
- Freude (Joy) - Stockhausen: World Premiere Milan 2006
- Royal Philharmonic Society (RPS) Music Award (UK): Nomination for performance in season 2008
