= Amplitude panning =

Amplitude panning is a technique in sound engineering where the same sound signal is applied to a number of loudspeakers in different directions equidistant from the listener. Then, a virtual source appears to a direction that is dependent on amplitudes of the loudspeakers. The direction may not coincide with any physical sound source. Most typically amplitude panning has been used with stereophonic loudspeaker setup. However, it is increasingly used to position virtual sources to arbitrary loudspeaker setups.

== History ==
First invented by Blumlein in early 1930s, original stereophony was a system that converts the phase difference of the signals recorded by a pair of microphones to the amplitude difference of in-phase input signals to two loudspeakers.

== Operation ==
Assuming free field sound propagation, it has been shown that the sound field presented by these two transducers can deliver an appropriate phase difference between the positions of listener’s ears at low frequencies, where the relation between the position of phantom image and the corresponding amplitude ratio may be summarized by the so-called ‘sine law’ (similarly, the tangent law).

The system was designed to work approximately below 1 kHz, above which the given phase difference becomes ambiguous, and so does the position of the sound image. However, it was suggested that the localisation at relatively high frequencies may take advantage of the interaural level difference resulting from the head-shadowing effect.

For the frontal standard configuration, the relation between the inter-channel level difference and the perceived image position has been investigated in many studies, where the target positions were found to be slightly overestimated in many cases. Similar listening tests were also carried out for some asymmetrical lateral configurations, and the results showed that the amplitude-panning method is not as efficient in presenting images to listener’s side as it is to the front.
