= Kathinka Pasveer =

Dutch flautist

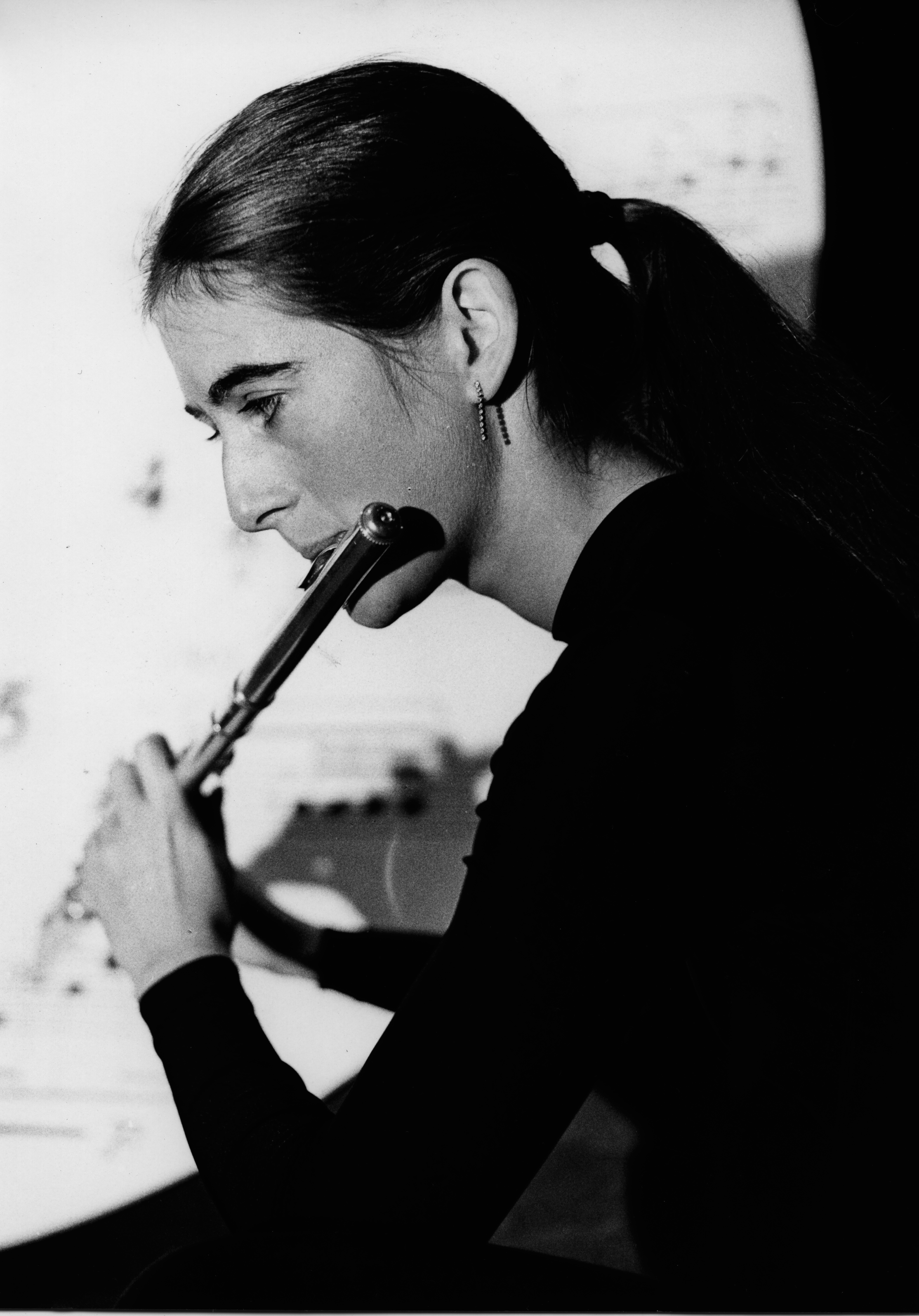

Background information
- Born: Kathinka Pasveer; 11 June 1959 (age 67); Zaandam, Netherlands
- Genre: Classical
- Occupations: soloist, chamber musician, dancer-mime
- Instruments: Flute, Alto flute, Piccolo, electronic music
- Years active: 1980s–present
- Labels: Acanta, Deutsche Grammophon, Stockhausen Complete Edition
- Website: http://www.karlheinzstockhausen.org

Kathinka Pasveer (born 11 June 1959) is a Dutch flautist.

== Biography ==
Kathinka Pasveer was born in Zaandam, The Netherlands, daughter of Ini Menkveld and the conductor Jan Pasveer, who also taught at the Amsterdam Conservatory. She studied with Frans Vester at the Royal Conservatory of The Hague, where she received her performer's diploma, with the distinction of the Nicolai Prize in 1983. During her final year of studies she was the principal flutist of the Gewestelijk Orkest Zuid-Holland.

In December 1982 Karlheinz Stockhausen was invited to the Royal Conservatory for a series of concerts, master classes, and lectures, at which time Pasveer worked with the composer and with Suzanne Stephens on his compositions Zeitmaße, Amour, and In Freundschaft. Stockhausen invited her to work with him on a new work for flute and six percussionists, which was composed in February and March 1983 and premiered at the Donaueschinger Musiktage in October 1983. It took six months of rehearsals to prepare this work for performance. This was Kathinkas Gesang als Luzifers Requiem, the second scene of the opera Samstag aus Licht, which she also performed at the staged premiere of Samstag at La Scala in Milan in May 1984. The next year, Stockhausen made a new version of the piece, for flute and six-channel electronic music, and Pasveer likewise gave its premiere at Ircam in Paris in May 1985. As a result of this initial contact Stockhausen began featuring the flute in the Licht cycle. She worked with Stockhausen for twenty-five years, up until his death in December 2007. He composed many works especially for her, all of which she premiered, and many of which are dedicated to her. These included parts in the operas Montag aus Licht (La Scala 1988), Dienstag aus Licht (Leipzig Opera 1993), and Freitag aus Licht (Leipzig Opera 1996), as well as the concert premieres of Orchester-Finalisten (Carré, Amsterdam, 1996), Michaelion from Mittwoch aus Licht (Prinzregententheater, Munich, 1998), and Pasveer performed as one of the 4 soloists in the world première of Licht-Bilder (third scene of Sonntag aus Licht (Donaueschingen, 16 October 2004). After Licht, Stockhausen composed for her the flute version of Harmonien (2006, premiered 13 July 2007 at the Sülztalhalle in Kürten) and Paradies (2007, premiered on 24 August 2009 at the Laeiszhalle in Hamburg), components of the chamber-music cycle Klang.

In addition to her activities as a flautist, in 1989 she learned the solo dancer-mime part for Stockhausen's Inori, which she performed for the first time on 27 May 1989 in the Kölner Philharmonie, with the Gürzenich Orchestra conducted by the composer. When pressed to name a favourite from all of Stockhausen's compositions, Pasveer named Inori as a "very special" piece that she privately "performs" almost every day, "as it is my form of meditation". She also performs from memory the 83-minute-long Vortrag über HU (a sung and mimed lecture introducing Inori), in both German and English, and has made video recordings of both versions. She also performed the dancer-mime part in EXAMINATION (3rd scene from Act 1 of DONNERSTAG aus LICHT) andVision (act 3 scene 2 of Donnerstag aus Licht). Pasveer also has recorded as a soprano singer in a number of Stockhausen's works, including the electronic music for both Dienstag aus Licht (Oktophonie) and Freitag aus Licht, as well as Die sieben Lieder der Tage (extracted from "Montag"), Zwei Paare (made as soundtrack music for the 2000 short film In Absentia by the Brothers Quay), and Urantia (the Nineteenth Hour from Klang).

From 1998 up to the present time, Pasveer has taught the interpretation of Stockhausen's works at the Stockhausen Courses held each summer in Kürten. Beginning in 1983, she assisted Stockhausen in the production of recordings and learned from him the techniques of sound projection used in most of his works. Since the composer’s death, she has acted as sound projectionist in many live performances, and has produced and mixed down the last recordings in the Stockhausen Complete Edition. Stockhausen also entrusted her, together with Antonio Pérez-Abellán, with the production of the sound loops in the 24 individual layers of his electronic work Cosmic Pulses in 2006.

Together with Suzanne Stephens, she is in charge of Stockhausen's legacy as a director of the Stockhausen Foundation for Music. Harpist Marianne Smit is her niece.

== Discography ==
=== Flautist ===
- 1985. Karlheinz Stockhausen dirigiert Haydn & Mozart. Wolfgang Amadeus Mozart: Concerto for Flute and Orchestra in G Major, KV 313 (cadenzas by Karlheinz Stockhausen). Kathinka Pasveer, flute; Radio-Symphonie-Orchester Berlin; Karlheinz Stockhausen, cond. (Also with: Joseph Haydn: Concerto for Trumpet and Orchestra in E-flat Major.) Acanta 43813. Hamburg: Fono Team GmbH. Also issued with the addition of Stockhausen, Oberlippentanz, Acanta 40.23 543 DT (LP). 1986. Reissued as part of Stockhausen Conducts Haydn and Mozart. Stockhausen Complete Edition CD 39 (2 CDs). Kürten: Stockhausen-Verlag, 1993.
- 1985. Stockhausen, Karlheinz. Tierkreis: Trio Version. Markus Stockhausen, trumpet and piano; Kathinka Pasveer, flute and piccolo; Suzanne Stephens, clarinet. Acanta 23531 (LP); also issued on Acanta 43201 (CD). Hamburg: Fono Team GmbH.
- 1988. Karlheinz Stockhausen, Samstag aus Licht, opera. (Kathinka Pasveer, flute and piccolo in scenes 2 & 3). Deutsche Grammophon 423 596-2 (4 CDs). Hamburg: Polydor International GmbH, 1988. Reissued on Stockhausen Complete Edition CD 34-ABCD (4 CDs). Kürten: Stockhausen-Verlag, 1992.
- 1992. Michaels Reise um die Erde (Solisten-Version). ECM 1406 (CD).
- 1992. Stockhausen Complete Edition CD 28 Music für Flöte: Kathinka Pasveer spielt 9 Kompositionen. (2 CDs). Includes Stockhausen, In Freundschaft, for flute; Piccolo for piccolo flute, Amour for flute; Susanis Echo, for alto flute; Xi, for flute; Zungenspitzentanz for piccolo flute; Flautina, for flute with piccolo flute and alto flute; Ypsilon, for flute; Kathinkas Gesang, for flute and electronic music.
- 1992. Stockhausen Complete Edition CD 35 Stockhausen, Oberlippentanz for piccolo trumpet, 4 Horns and 2 percussionists Ave for basset-horn and alto flute. Tierkreis, trio version, for clarinet, flute and piccolo flute, trumpet and piano [recorded 1991, different recording from Acanta 23531]
- 1992. Stockhausen, Monday from Light, opera. Stockhausen Complete Edition CD 36-ABCDE (5 CDs). Kürten: Stockhausen-Verlag.
- 1994. Stockhausen, Musik für Klarinette, Baßklarinette, Bassetthorn: Suzee Stephens spielt 15 Kompositionen. Stockhausen Complete Edition CD 32 A–C (3 CDs). Kürten: Stockhausen-Verlag. Includes Bijou for alto flute, bass clarinet and tape, and Sukat for basset-horn and alto flute, both with Kathinka Pasveer.
- 1996. Stockhausen, Dienstag aus Licht, opera. Stockhausen Complete Edition CD 40 (2 CDs). Kürten: Stockhausen-Verlag.
- 2003. Stockhausen, Freitag aus Licht, opera. Stockhausen Complete Edition CD 50 A–D (4 CDs). Kürten: Stockhausen-Verlag.
- 1997. Stockhausen, Orchester-Finalisten of Mittwoch aus Licht (with the Asko Ensemble). Stockhausen Complete Edition CD 52. Kürten: Stockhausen-Verlag.
- 2000. Kathinka: Flute and Synthesizer. Stockhausen Complete Edition CD 57 Stockhausen, Zungenspitzentanz, for piccolo flute, euphonium, synthesizer player, and percussionist; Freia version for flute; Entführung for Piccolo Flute. Flöte for flute and electronic music (from Orchester-Finalisten); Thinki for flute (from Michaelion, of Mittwoch aus Licht). (Also with Klavierstück XVI and Komet als Klavierstück XVII, with Kathinka Pasveer, soprano, on tape). Kürten: Stockhausen-Verlag.
- 2002. Stockhausen, Die sieben Lieder der Tage (versions for flute and for soprano, extracted from Montag aus Licht), Der Kinderfänger, for alto flute with piccolo, two synthesizer players, percussionist, tape, and sound projectionist. (Also with Luzifers Zorn). Stockhausen Complete Edition CD 63. Kürten: Stockhausen-Verlag.
- 2002. Stockhausen, Europa-Gruss for winds and synthesizers (Kathinka Pasveer, flute); Two Couples, for electronic and concrete music, and Electronic and Concrete Music for Komet (Kathinka Pasveer, soprano). (Also with Stop and Start for 6 instrumental groups, and Licht-Ruf.) Stockhausen Complete Edition CD 64. Kürten: Stockhausen-Verlag.
- 2003. Stockhausen, Ten Scenes from Freitag aus Licht. Stockhausen Complete Edition CD 65. Kürten: Stockhausen-Verlag.
- 2005. Stockhausen, Licht-Bilder (3rd Scene of Sonntag aus Licht), for tenor, ring-modulated flute, basset horn, and ring-modulated trumpet. Stockhausen Complete Edition CD 68. Kürten: Stockhausen-Verlag.
- 2007. Stockhausen, Quitt for alto flute, clarinet and piccolo trumpet. (Also with Michaels-Ruf, Bassetsu, Synthi-Fou (Klavierstück XV), Komet version for percussionist, and Trumpetent). Stockhausen Complete Edition CD 82. Kürten: Stockhausen-Verlag.
- 2009. Paradies for flute and electronic music: Twenty-First Hour from Klang, the 24 hours of the day. Stockhausen Complete Edition CD 99 Kürten: Stockhausen-Verlag.
- 2010. Harmonien and Schönheit. Stockhausen Complete Edition CD 87. Kürten: Stockhausen-Verlag.

=== Soprano ===
- 1996. Electronic Music with Sound Scenes of Friday From Light. Stockhausen Complete Edition CD 49 (2 CDs). Kürten: Stockhausen-Verlag.
- 2000. Stockhausen Complete Edition CD 48. Stockhausen, Paare vom Freitag, for soprano, bass, and electronic instruments. Kürten: Stockhausen-Verlag.
- 2002. Die sieben Lieder der Tage (versions for flute and for soprano), Der Kinderfänger, for alto flute with piccolo, two synthesizer players, percussionist, tape, and sound projectionist. (Also with Luzifers Zorn). Stockhausen Complete Edition CD 63. Kürten: Stockhausen-Verlag.
- 2009. Urantia for soprano and electronic music. Stockhausen Complete Edition CD 97. Kürten: Stockhausen-Verlag.

== Filmography ==
- 1985. Kathinkas Gesang de Karlheinz Stockhausen. Colour film, 33'21". French. Paris: I.R.C.A.M.
- 1998. Stockhausen, Vortrag über HU (German version). Colour film by Suzanne Stephens. 83 minutes. Live recording of the first integral performance in German with Kathinka Pasveer on 5 April 1998, at the Audimax of the Technical College in Darmstadt. (Archive No. 107 / 1). Kürten: Stockhausen-Verlag
- 1998. INORI für 2 Solisten und Tonband. Colour film by Suzanne Stephens. 73 minutes. Live recording of a performance of INORI on 5 April 1998 at the Audimax of the Technical College in Darmstadt, with Kathinka Pasveer and Alain Louafi (dancer-mimes). Kürten: Stockhausen-Verlag.
- 1998. Stockhausen, Michaelion, scene 4 from Mittwoch aus Licht. Colour film by Suzanne Stephens. 59 minutes. (Archive No. 109 / 1). Live recording of the world première on July 26, 1998 in Munich at the Prinzregenten Theatre with the choir of the South German Radio (conductor: Rupert Huber), Michael Vetter (short-wave singer), Kathinka Pasveer (flute), Suzanne Stephens (basset-horn), Marco Blaauw (trumpet), and Andrew Digby (trombone). Kürten: Stockhausen-Verlag.
- 2003. Stockhausen, Lecture on HU. Colour film by Suzanne Stephens. 83 minutes. Live recording of the integral performance in English with Kathinka Pasveer on August 17, 2003 at the Sülztalhalle in Kürten during the Stockhausen Courses Kürten 2003. (Archive No. 149 / 2). Kürten: Stockhausen-Verlag.

== Reviews ==
- Anon. 1993. "Recent Recordings: Stockhausen 35". Flute Talk 13 (November): 20.
- Frisius, Rudolf. 1986. "Schallplatten: Wolfgang Amadeus Mozart: Flötenkonzert G-Dur, KV 313 (Kadenzen: Karlheinz Stockhausen); Joseph Haydn: Trompetenkonzert Es-Dur (Kadenzen: Karlheinz Stockhausen); Karlheinz Stockhausen, Oberlippentanz für Trompete solo. Kathinka Pasveer, Flöte, Markus Stockhausen, Trompete, Radio-Symphobie-Orchester Berlin, Dirigent: Katlheinz Stockhausen. Acanta 40.23 543 DT". Neue Zeitschrift für Musik 147, no. 11 (November): 66–67.
- Hodges, Nicolas. 1993. "Reviews: CDs—Flute Music: In Freundschaft, Piccolo, Amour, Susanis Echo, Xi, Zungenspitzentanz, Flautina, Ypsilon, Kathinkas Gesang." The Musical Times 134 (March): 155.
- Nordin, Ingvar Loco. n.d. "Stockhausen Edition no. 28 (9 works for flute, piccolo & alto flute) ". Sonoloco Record Reviews.
- Watkins, Glenn. 2003. "Music of the European Avant-Garde: Karlheinz Stockhausen’s Samstag aus Licht: A Contemporary Report". In The Wind Band and Its Repertoire: Two Decades of Research as Published in the College Band Directors National Association Journal, edited by Michael Votta, 171–73. The Donald Hunsberger Wind Library. Miami: Warner Brothers/Alfred Music Publishing. ISBN 0-7579-1833-6.
