= Dissonanze =

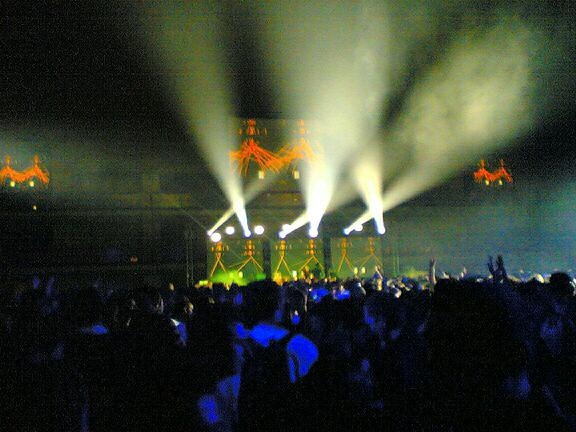
- Genre: Electronic music, multimedia & video art
- Locations: Palazzo dei Congressi, Rome, Italy
- Years active: 2000 - 2010
- Website: www.dissonanze.it

Dissonanze was a yearly festival focused on electronic music held in Rome, Italy. The first edition was in 2000. Besides music it also focuses on multimedia & video art. The festival takes place at the Palazzo dei Congressi in Rome.

== Dissonanze 6 ==
- T. Raumschmiere, a.o..

== Dissonanze 8 ==
- Caribou, No Age, Yacht, a.o..

== Dissonanze 9 ==
8th and 9 May 2009.

- Micachu, Timo Maas, Telepathe, A Critical Mass, a.o.

== See also ==
- List of electronic music festivals
