= Dienstag aus Licht =

Opera by Karlheinz Stockhausen

- Opera by Karlheinz Stockhausen
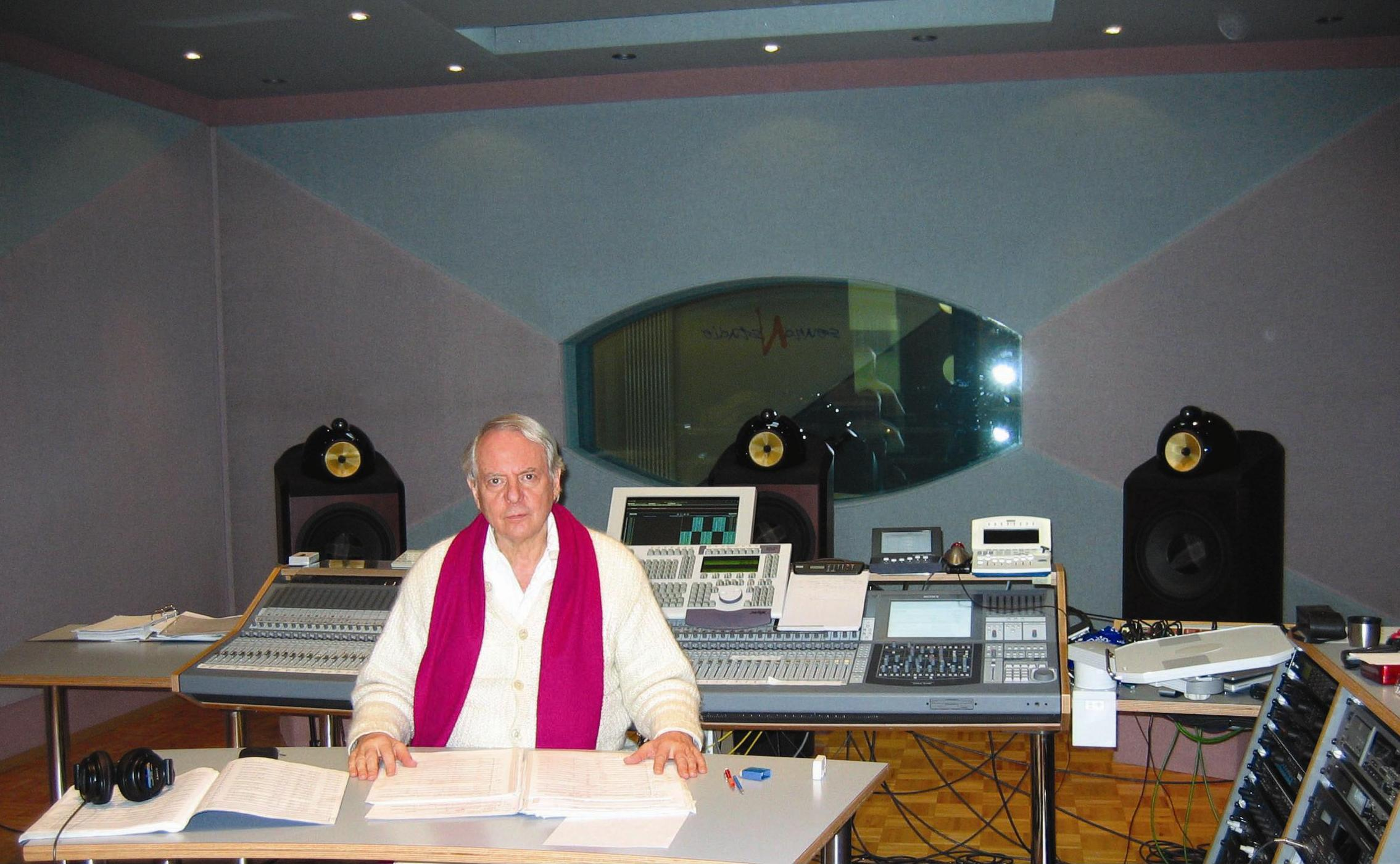
- Stockhausen, 7 March 2004
- Librettist: Stockhausen
- Language: German
- Premiere: May 28, 1993; Leipzig Opera

Dienstag aus Licht (Tuesday from Light) is an opera by Karlheinz Stockhausen in a greeting and two acts, with a farewell, and was the fourth of seven to be completed for the opera cycle Licht: Die sieben Tage der Woche (Light: The Seven Days of the Week). It was begun in 1977 and completed from 1988 to 1991, to a libretto by the composer.

== History ==
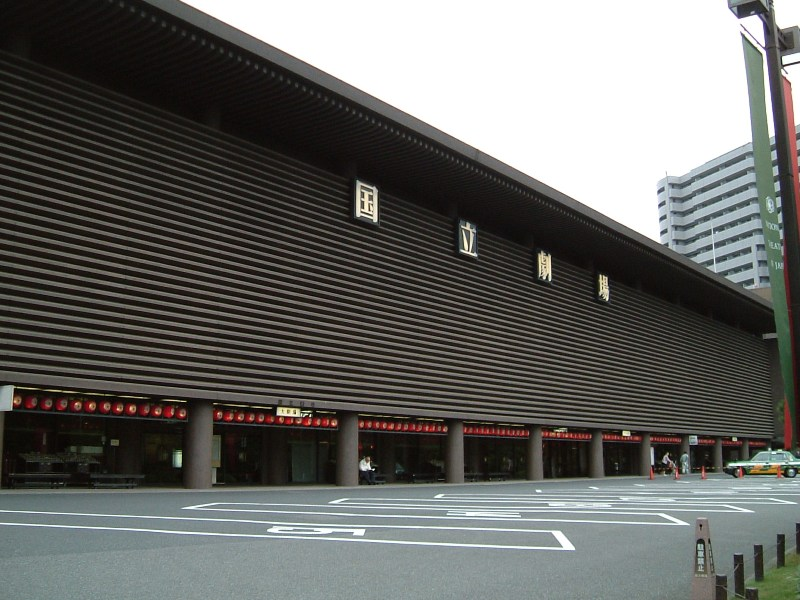
Tokyo National Theatre, where Jahreslauf was premiered in 1977

Dienstag is an opera for 17 solo performers (three singers, 10 instrumentalists, 4 dancer-mimes), actors, mimes, choir, orchestra, and electronic music. Tuesday is the red day of conflict between Michael and Lucifer.

As was the case for most of the operas in the Licht cycle, component sections of Dientag were commissioned and composed separately, and given seriatim premieres. The first component of this opera was in fact the first part of the entire Licht cycle to be composed: Jahreslauf (Course of the Years), which became the first act of Dienstag, was originally written in 1977 as an independent piece for gagaku ensemble. Stockhausen finished it in Kyoto in the fall of 1977, and it was premiered by the Imperial Gagaku Ensemble at the Tokyo National Theatre on 31 October. This version is dedicated to Jaynee Stephens. A concert version for European instruments, with the slightly different title Der Jahreslauf (The Course of the Years), was performed in the Large Broadcasting Hall of the WDR, Cologne, on 10 February 1979. The day before the premiere, a studio recording was made for commercial release, and the same musicians participated in five staged performances of this act produced by the Paris Opera at the Opéra-Comique from 20 to 24 November 1979. It was while working on this piece in Japan that the idea occurred to him of composing a seven-part cycle of operas, all based on a single, multi-layered musical formula. In the spring of 1991 Stockhausen added a narrative frame for Michael and Lucifer.

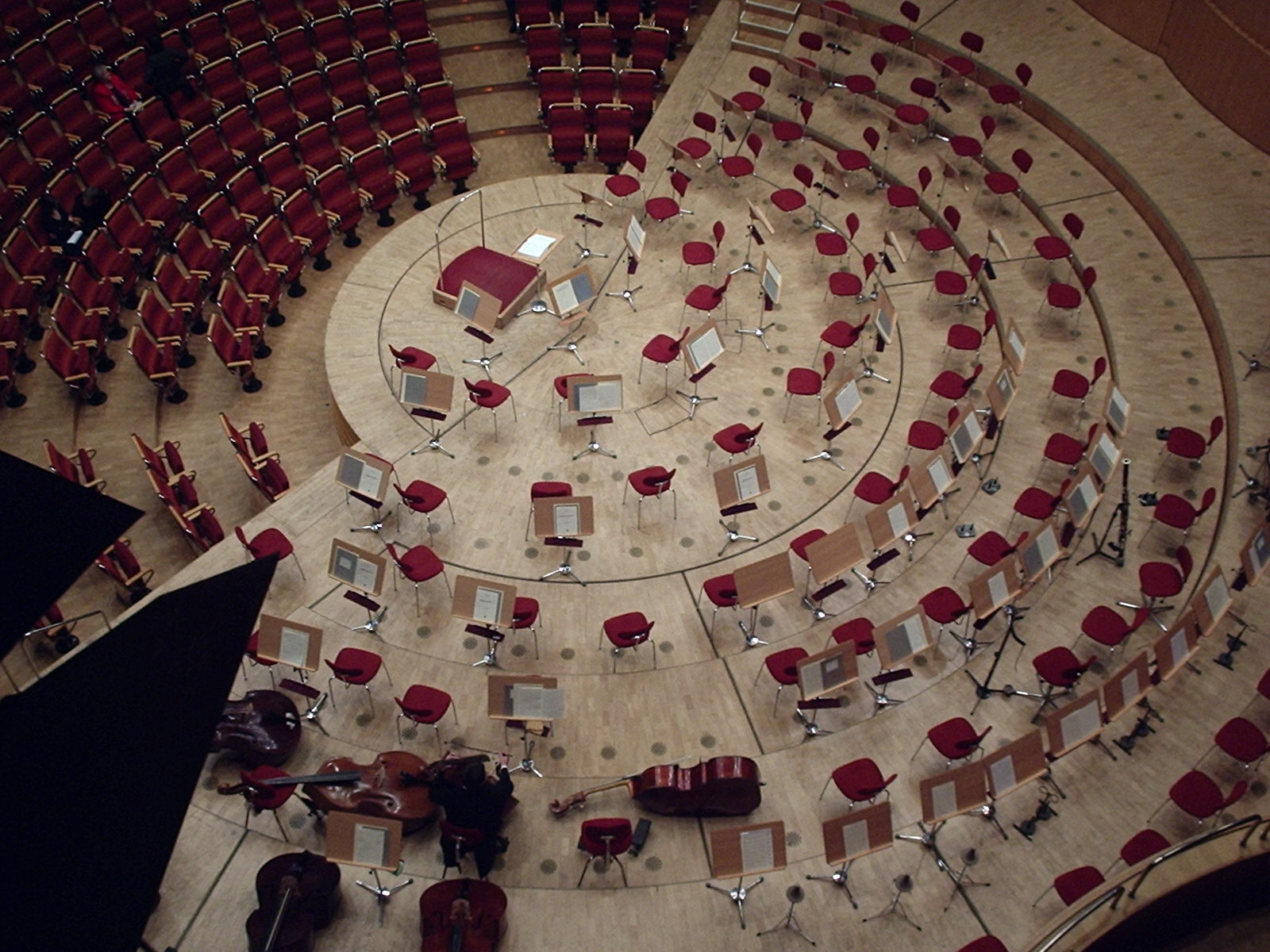
Stage of the Kölner Philharmonie, where the Dienstags-Gruß was premiered

The Dienstags-Gruß (Tuesday's Greeting) was commissioned by the University of Cologne for the celebration of the 600th anniversary of its founding in 1388. It was premiered under the title Willkommen mit Friedensgruß (Welcome with Peace Greeting) on 4 November 1988 in the Kölner Philharmonie, as part of the ceremony marking the anniversary. The performers were Annette Meriweather (soprano), the Collegium Musicum Vocale of the University of Cologne, and an ensemble of nine trumpets (rehearsed by Markus Stockhausen) and nine trombones (rehearsed by Michael Svoboda), with Michael Obst and Simon Stockhausen (synthesizers). Dieter Gutknecht, music director of the university, conducted. Willkommen opened the ceremony, followed by the rector's greeting, speeches by the mayor of Cologne, the governor of the state of North Rhine-Westphalia, and the president of Germany, and the conferring of honors by the rector. The Friedensgruß was then performed and, after a celebratory lecture, the final section was repeated as a "closing hymn".

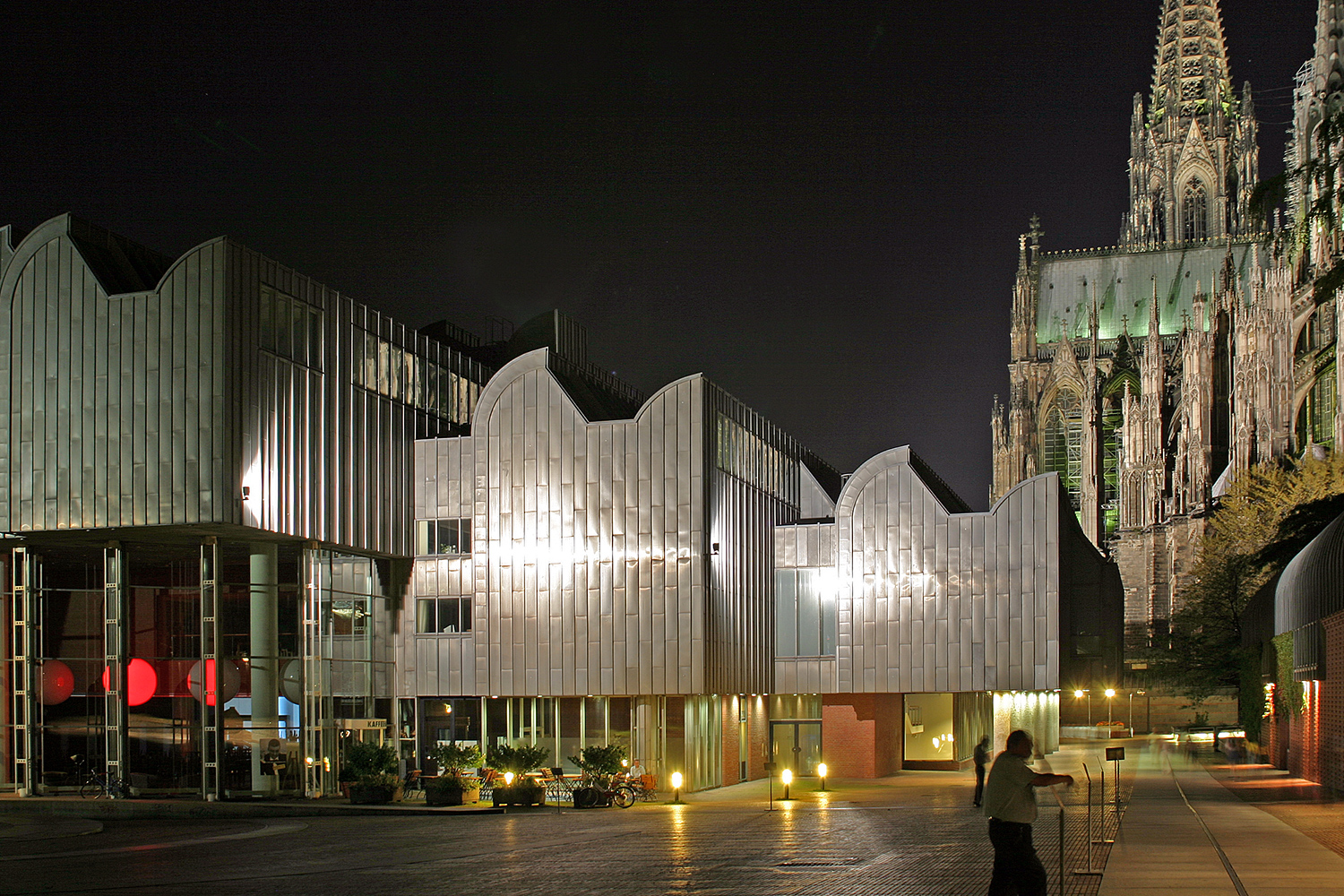
Museum Ludwig, where Klavierstück XV was premiered (Cologne Cathedral in the background)

The second act, Invasion, was originally commissioned for the Ensemble InterContemporain by Michel Guy, director of the Festival d'Automne, on the occasion of the bicentenary of the French Revolution in 1989. However, the administration of the ensemble declined to perform it after being informed of the requirements. Consequently, the score was not worked out until 1990. The solo synthesizer part together with the electronic music for the closing five scenes of this act ("Pietà", "Explosion", "Jenseits", "Synthi-Fou", and "Abschied") constitute Stockhausen's Klavierstück XV. The score is dedicated to the composer's son, Simon Stockhausen, who gave the premiere performance at the Museum Ludwig in Cologne on 5 October 1992.

Dienstag as a whole was originally commissioned by the Teatro alla Scala, Milan, but on 7 May 1991 the new Sovrintendente of La Scala, Carlo Fontana, wrote Stockhausen to say cuts to government support of La Scala had forced cancellation of the premiere there in 1992 as planned, and subsequent correspondence led to the release of rights for the premiere. Dienstag was given its staged premiere on 28 May 1993 by the Leipzig Opera. Subsequent performances were on 29 and 30 May. The stage realisation was by Uwe Wand, Henryk Tomaszewski, and Johannes Conen. Karlheinz Stockhausen was the music director and sound projectionist. The actor-mimes were members of the Tomaszewski Pantomime Theater, Wrocław.

== Roles ==
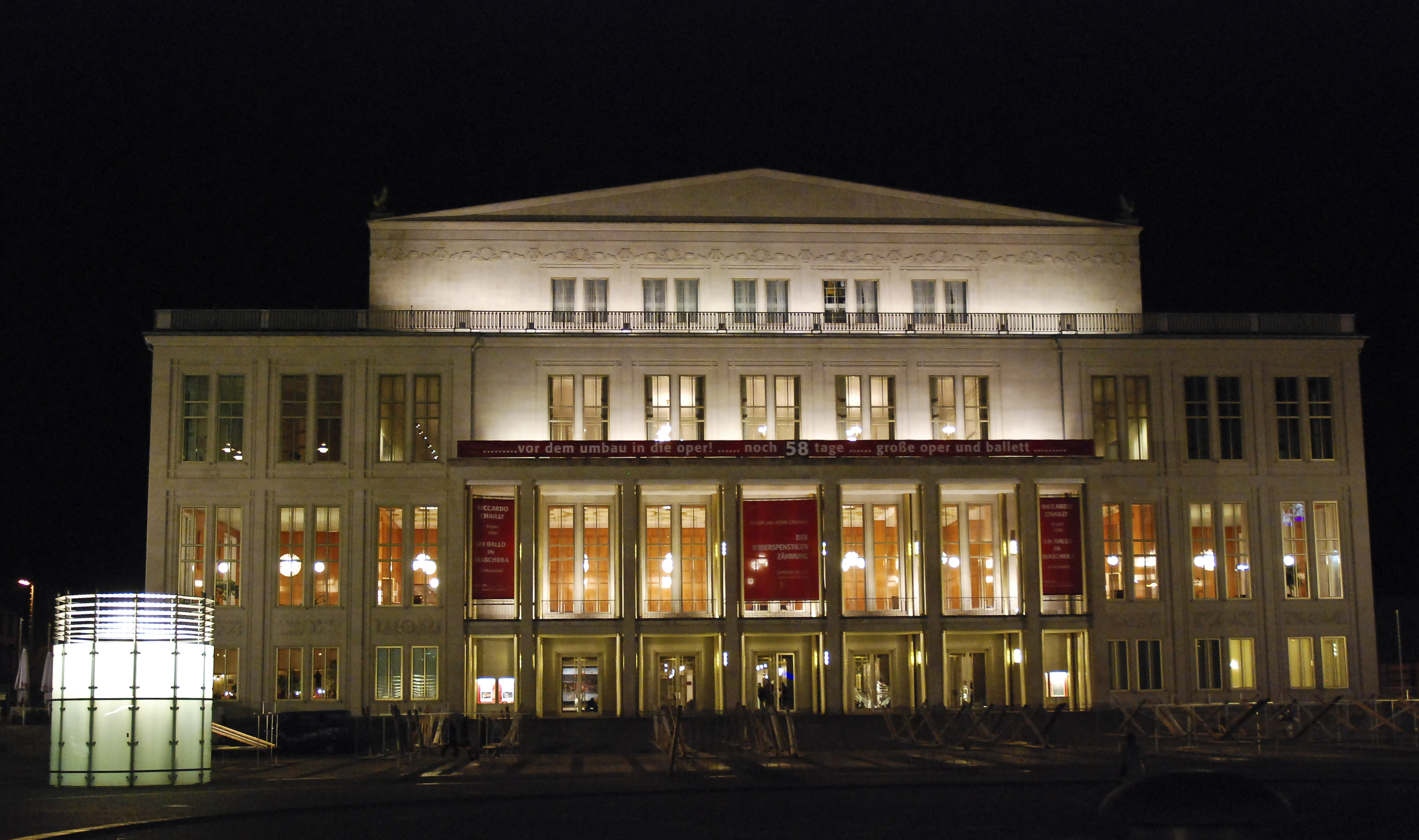
Leipzig Opera House, where Dienstag was first staged

Roles, voice types/instruments/performer, premiere cast
Role	Performer	Premiere cast
Eve	soprano	Annette Meriweather
Michael	tenor	Julian Pike
Lucifer	bass	Nicholas Isherwood
Michael	trumpets and flugelhorn	Markus Stockhausen, Andreas Adam, Achim Gorsch
Lucifer	trombones	Michael Svoboda, Timo Bäuerle, Iven Hausmann
Synthi-Fou	synthesizers	Simon Stockhausen
	synthesizer	Massimiliano Viel
	percussion	Andreas Boettger, Renee Jonker
Millenium Runner	dancer	Tadeusz Dylawerski
Century Runner	dancer	Jerzy Reterski
Decade Runner	dancer	Marek Oleksy
Year runner	dancer	Artur Borkowski
Little Girl	actor	Katja Mittag / Manuela Fritz
Three Applauders	actors	Zbigniew Szymczyk, Krzysztof Antkowiak, Maciej Prusak
Cook	actor	Aleksander Sobiszewski
Three Waiters	actors	Zdzisław Zaleziński, Krzysztof Antkowiak, Artur Grochowiecki
Lion	actor	Maciej Prusak
Car Driver (Ape)	actor	Aleksander Sobiszewski
Beautiful Woman	actor	Anja Hanisch
Four Thunderstorm Acrobats	actors	Krzysztof Antkowiak, Artur Grochowiecki, Maciej Prusak, Aleksander Sobiszewski
Michael and Lucifer Choirs / Those from the Beyond	choir	Chor der Musikalischen Komödie, Extrachor der Musikalischen Komödie, Leipziger Vocal-Ensemble

== Synopsis ==
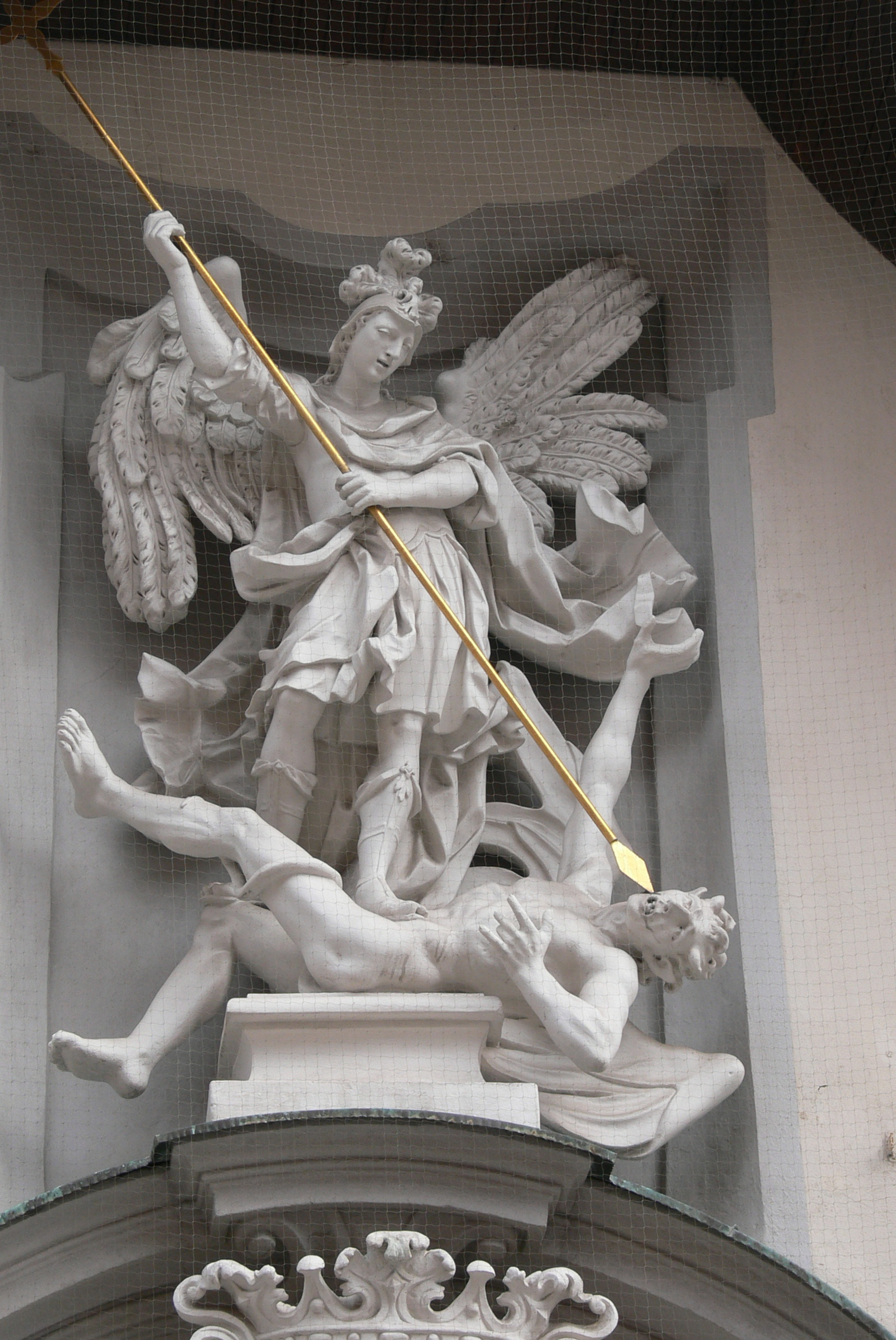
Michael in combat with Lucifer

=== Dienstags-Gruß ===
A "Welcome" fanfare from a choir of trumpets and trombones with synthesizers is followed by a "Peace Greeting", in which a Michael choir of sopranos and tenors opposes a Lucifer choir of altos and basses from opposite sides of the hall in a musical dispute. A soprano (Eve) intervenes four times in an attempt to mediate—first appearing at the right side of the audience, then at the back, and a third time at the left, before finally walking out on to the stage in front where she remains, singing to both groups until the end, when both parties agree, "We want peace, freedom", but with a remaining difference, "in/without God!".

=== Act 1: Der Jahreslauf ===
The first act, The Course of the Years, is performed as a ballet, accompanied by a tenor, bass, actor-singers, modern orchestra, tape and sound projectionist. Lucifer challenges Michael to a contest, a race of the years. He, Lucifer, will attempt to stop the flow of time, and Michael shall try to set it going again. Four dancers personify the years, the decades, the centuries, and the millennia, while four groups of musicians play music in four corresponding temporal layers. Lucifer stops the race four times with temptations, and each time Michael finds incitements to get it going again.

First Temptation
A ship's bell and marching steps of three entering characters are followed by an announcement by men's voices offering flowers to the runners, who stop.
First Incitement
Children run in, clapping their hands, and a girl's voice urges the audience to applaud the runners, who resume.
Second Temptation
"A cook with exquisite spices"
Second Incitement
A lion roars, and the runners quickly return to their rounds.
Third Temptation
An automobile drives onstage, tooting four bulb-horns. The runners stop to watch.
Third Incitement
A girl runs in to announce a cash prize for the winner of the race, which spurs the runners on. The car rushes off.
Fourth Temptation
A slow, sultry blues in night-club style is followed by a man's voice, announcing the entrance of a female figure: "ho ho ho ho: stark naked!"
Fourth Incitement
A ferocious thunderstorm breaks the spell and the runners continue.

With irony, Lucifer congratulates Michael on winning the contest, but darkly warns: "MIKA, brace yourself for a much tougher fight!".

=== Act 2: Invasion-Explosion mit Abschied ===
Eight-channel electronic music (called Oktophonie when performed separately) is projected from the corners of a cube surrounding the audience throughout Act 2. The act is divided into three large sections, together containing eleven scenes, though they run continuously without a break.

==== Invasion ====
The stage is filled with a rocky precipice, covered with vines, moss, shrubs, and bushes. At the front there is a raised, rocky ledge, which slopes down to the ground at the left and right. Night is falling, and the sky is overcast.

- Erste Luftabwehr (First Air Defense). High above from the rear, a dark-toned, deep droning sound approaches, shortly joined by brighter music. Deep "sound bombs" explode at periodic intervals. Searchlights leap up from the crevices of the rock face and scan the sky. Cannon muzzles shaped like trumpet bells are just visible in the precipice. As a chordal sound of high-altitude flight squadrons appears, salvos of anti-aircraft sound missiles shoot skyward. Three times, silver-coloured aircraft are brought spinning downward to crash onto the rock ledge. The rock face opens at the right. A shadowy figure slips out, approaches one of the downed aircraft, and slowly extracts a writhing, miniature human body. After holding it up in the glare of the searchlights, the figure disappears back through the rocky door, which closes again.
- Erste Invasion (First Invasion). As the sound bombs continue to detonate, approaching signals of trumpets and trombones can be heard. Lucifer's troops, wearing black and red battle dress invade the hall, pursued by Michael's trumpeter troops, dressed in light blue and red. As the combatants move to and fro, the Lucifer troops succeed in removing some of the camouflage from the precipice, revealing a chrome bunker wall. The combat moves off to the right, the bass detonations cease, the music flak falls silent, and the melancholy Wednesday segment of Eve's formula in the octophonic music suffuses the space.
- Zweite Luftabwehr (Second Air Defense). Once again the searchlights find a target in the sky, and a hissing sound shoots out from the chrome wall and strikes its target. A soft rumbling resumes, and a young voice from outer space counts, slowly and hoarsely from one to seven.
- Zweite Invasion (Second Invasion). As the air defense continues, Michael's trumpeters (now dressed in bluish chrome uniforms) enter from the right, falling back from the onslaught of Lucifer's trombone troops (wearing shimmering black chrome armament). The struggle intensifies, and becomes concentrated on the plinth of the bunker. Despite fierce resistance from Michael's forces, the Lucifer troop climbs onto the bunker and begin cutting the chrome wall to pieces, using laser welders. Behind the chrome plates is revealed a wall of rock crystal.
- Verwundung (Casualty). A piercing scream cuts through the turmoil, and the sounds of combat abruptly cease. The combatants draw away to the right and left. A trumpeter lies at the base of the bunker, severely wounded.

==== Pietà ====
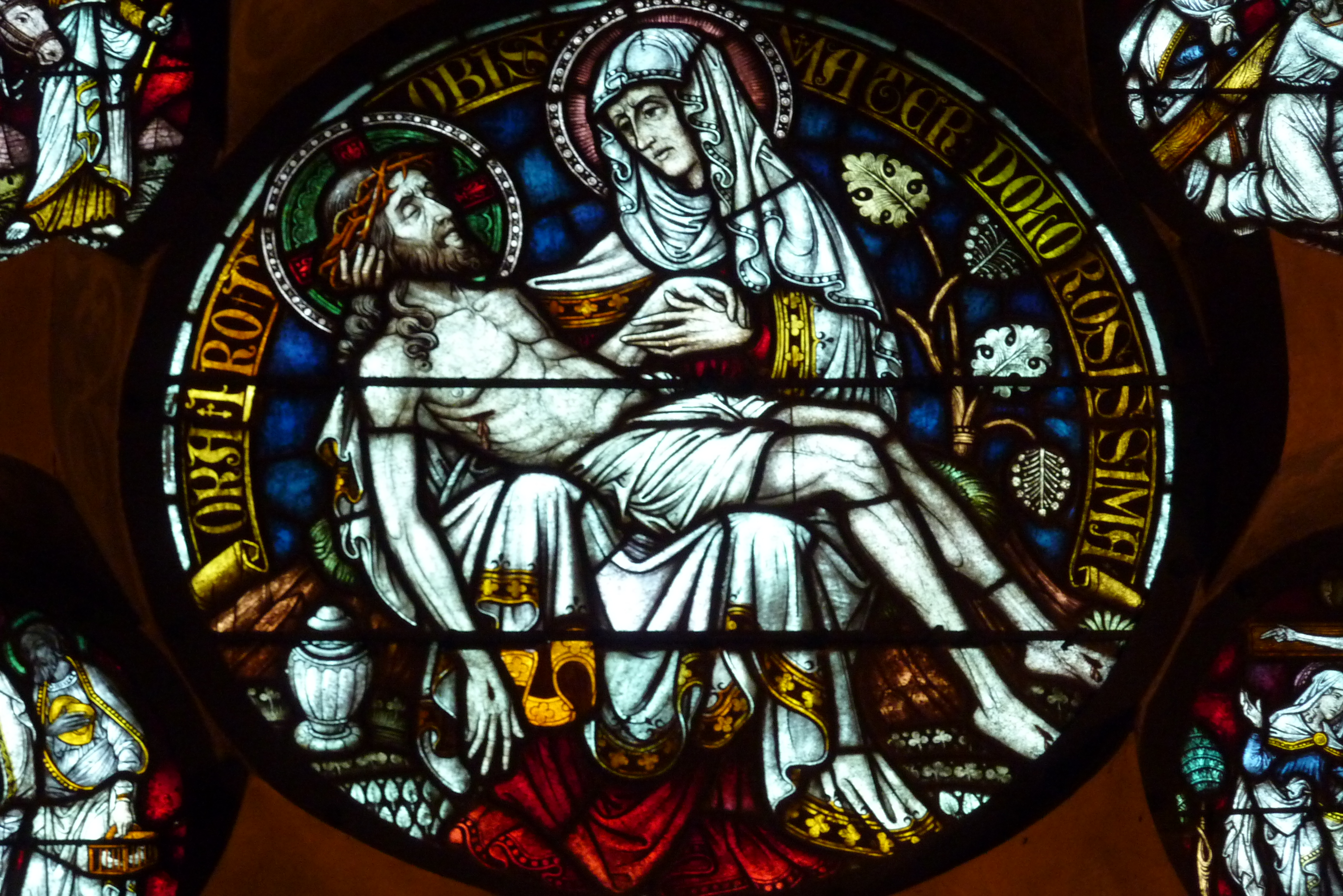
Pietà in the Markuskapelle in Altenberg, where Stockhausen grew up

- Pietà. One of the Michael trumpeters has been mortally wounded. Eve (soprano) appears and sits down, cradling the dying trumpeter in her lap in a pose resembling the portrayal of Christ in the lap of his mother Mary in many paintings and sculptures titled Pietà. The trumpeter's soul rises out of his body and stands, very tall, behind Eve and plays a quarter-tone flugelhorn in a duet with her.
- Dritte Invasion (Third Invasion). The crack of a rocket rushing up from the crystal wall into the sky startles Eve and causes the ethereal form standing behind her to evaporate. Two escorts carry the trumpeter's body to the bunker, followed by Eve, as searchlights scan the skies. A Lucifer assault party pursues a group of Michael's partisans toward the bunker.
- Explosion. As a rapid succession of rockets down one flying machine after another, the Lucifer troops reach he crystal bunker which they attack with blowtorches and explosives. A succession of three large explosions progressively shatter the bunker into fragments, as the fighters disappear.

==== Jenseits ====
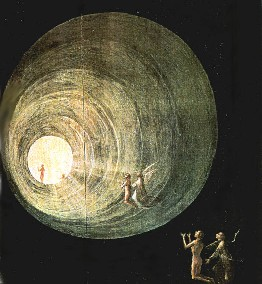
Ascent of the Blessed (detail), from the polyptych Visions of the Hereafter (ca. 1490) by Hieronymus Bosch—one of Stockhausen's favourite painters

- Jenseits (The Hereafter). As the snow-like dust of the pulverized crystal disperses, calm humming chords resonate from the opening in the bunker. Inside, a glass world bathed in white light becomes visible, in the midst of which a glass conveyor belt slowly carries toy silver and glass soldiers, aeroplanes, tanks, and battleships, marked into groups by coloured dots or stripes. On the left are seated bluish glass beings with high male voices; opposite them at the right are similar creatures with dark voices. They all stare at the war toys gliding past and, at intervals, pull toward them one or several of the toys using glass croupier rakes, knocking them down onto a lower conveyor belt moving in the opposite direction. All the while, stock-exchange clocks tally up the wins and losses, as the humming turns into singing.

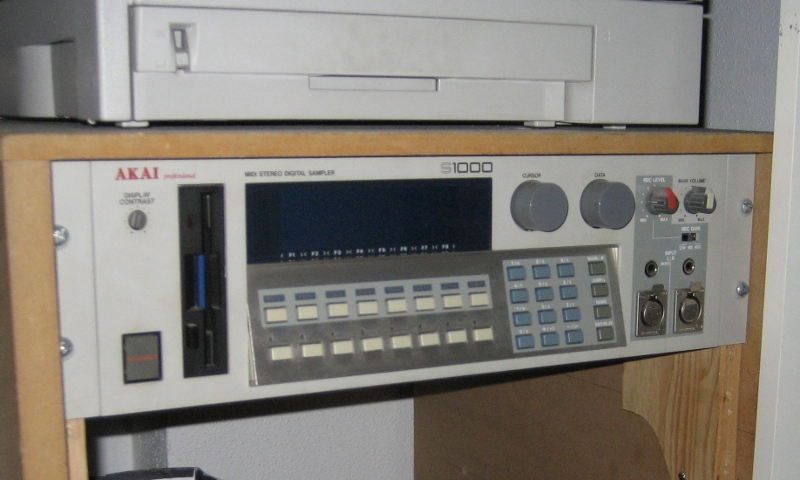
Akai S1000: one of two samplers used by Simon Stockhausen for Synthi-Fou

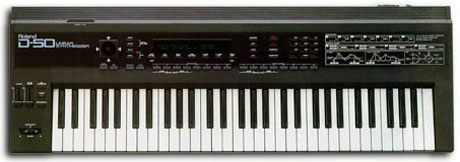
Roland D-50: one of the three synthesizers used for Synthi-Fou

- Synthi-Fou. At the words "effaces the suffering in all eternity", glass red-cross nurses enter and some of the men raise their arms above their heads, waving them back and forth. The women stand behind and above the seated glass men, and hold the fingertips of one or both hands. The war players are arrested by the entrance of a colourful long-nosed musician wearing green elephant ears and huge sun glasses. He is surrounded by multiple keyboards and loudspeakers and plays a "fouturistic" solo, absolutely happy. The war-gamers leave off their activity and sing chords accompanying Synthi-Fou. Though their language is unintelligible, it is clear that they are amused.
- Abschied (Farewell). As Synthi-Fou becomes ecstatic, the neglected toys fall off of the conveyor belt, and the boundaries of the room change into mirrors that reflect, invert, mix, and transform the beings, who depart in stylised dancing movements, leaving Synthi-Fou alone at the end.

== Discography ==
- Stockhausen, Karlheinz. Dienstag aus Licht. Annette Meriweather (soprano); Julian Pike (tenor); Nicholas Isherwood (bass); Markus Stockhausen (piccolo trumpet); Simon Stockhausen (synthesizer); WDR choir, Leipzig Vocal Ensemble, Choir of the Musical Comedy Leipzig. Karlheinz Stockhausen (sound projection). Stockhausen Complete Edition, CD 40 A–B (2CDs). Kürten: Stockhausen-Verlag, 1995.
- Schöpfung und Erschöpfung. Musik in Deutschland 1950–2000. Mauricio Kagel; Karlheinz Stockhausen. CD 74321 73635 2. [Munich]: BMG Ariola Classics, 2003. Includes Pietà, from act 2 of Dienstag aus Licht with Annette Meriweather (soprano), Markus Stockhausen (flugelhorn), and electronic music.
- Stockhausen, Karlheinz. Der Jahreslauf. Wilhelm Neuhaus, Günter Hempel, Harald Hoeren (harmoniums); David Gray (anvil); Kurt Nitschke, Hans-Martin Müller, Josef Heck (piccolos); Martin Schulz (bongo); Hugo Read, Gerhard Veek, Norbert Stein (soprano saxophones); Christoph Caskel (bass drum); Annemarie Bohne (harpsichord); Theodor Ross (guitar); tape; Karlheinz Stockhausen, sound projection. (LP) DG 2531 358. Hamburg: Polydor International, 1981. Reissued on CD, Stockhausen Complete Edition CD 29. Kürten: Stockhausen-Verlag, 1993.
- Stockhausen, Karlheinz. Oktophonie. Stockhausen Complete Edition CD 41. Kürten: Stockhausen-Verlag, 1994.
- Stockhausen, Karlheinz. Synthi-Fou (Klavierstück XV), Dienstags Abschied Klangfarben von Jenseits - Synthi-Fou - Abschied, Solo Synthi-Fou Simon Stockhausen (synthesizer). Stockhausen Complete Edition CD 42 (2CDs). Kürten: Stockhausen-Verlag, 1994.
- Stockhausen, Karlheinz. Posaune—Euphonium. Signale zur Invasion (from Dienstag aus Licht) In Freundschaft, Kinntanz (from Samstag aus Licht Michael Svoboda (trombone), Andreas Boettger (percussion), Simon Stockhausen (synthesizer). Stockhausen Complete Edition CD 44 (single CD). Kürten: Stockhausen-Verlag, 200?.
- Markus Stockhausen Plays Karlheinz Stockhausen. Markus Stockhausen (trumpet), Nick de Groot (double bass), Annette Meriweather (soprano). (Halt from Michaels Reise um die Erde, for trumpet and double bass; Aries from Sirius, for trumpet and electronic music; In Freundschaft for trumpet; Pietà from Dienstag aus Licht for flugelhorn and soprano.) EMI Classics (CD) 5 56645 2. Cologne: EMI Electrola GmbH, 1998. Reissued Stockhausen Complete Edition CD 60. Kürten: Stockhausen-Verlag.
- Stockhausen, Karlheinz. Saxophone. Amour for saxophone; Saxophon und Bongo (from Dienstag aus Licht); Piccolo for saxophone with geisha bells (from Dienstag aus Licht); In Freundschaft for saxophone; Knabenduett (from Donnerstag aus Licht); Entführung (from Montag aus Licht). Julien Petit and Antonio Felippe Belijar (saxophones), Kathinka Pasveer (geisha bells), Michael Pattmann (bongo), electronic and concrete music. Stockhausen Complete Edition 78 (single CD). Kürten: Stockhausen-Verlag, 2005.
- Da lontano: Giacinto Scelsi, John Cage, Karlheinz Stockhausen, Luigi Nono. Stockhausen, Signale zur Invasion I (from Dienstag aus Licht, version for unaccompanied trombone); Scelsi, Mantram—canto anonimo; Cage: Solo for Sliding Trombone; Nono: Post-prae-ludium n. 1 per donau. Mike Svoboda, trombone and tuba; Holger Stenschke, live electronics (in the Nono piece). Recorded 25–27 November 2011, Deutschlandfunk Kammermusiksaal. SACD hybrid recording: 1 disc, 12 cm., stereo + surround. WER 6744 2. Mainz: WERGO, 2012.
