= Sirius (Stockhausen) =

Sirius: eight-channel electronic music and trumpet, soprano, bass clarinet, and bass is a music-theatre composition by Karlheinz Stockhausen, composed between 1975 and 1977. It is Nr. 43 in the composer's catalogue of works, and lasts 96 minutes in performance.

== History ==
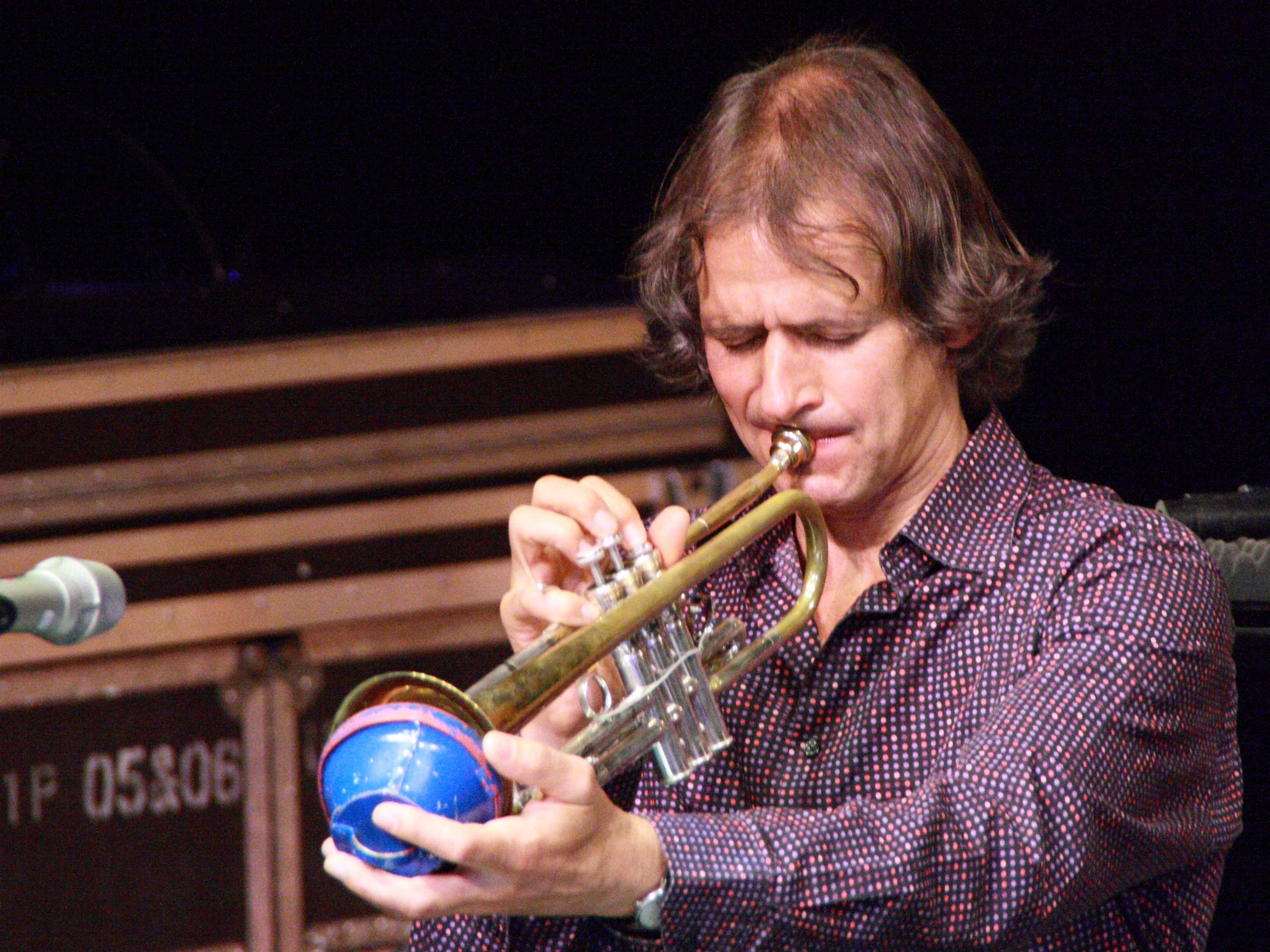
Markus Stockhausen created the trumpet part in Sirius

Sirius has been described as "a modern mystery play, clothed as a science fiction story". While not described by the composer as an opera, it is nevertheless a musical drama, in which four emissaries from a planet orbiting the star Sirius bring a message to earth. "This was to be the big leap into theatre proper. ... Sirius is the key work that leads to his magnum opus LICHT (LIGHT)".

When Stockhausen's daughter, Julika (aged 5 or 6 at the time), asked for a dog, he obtained one for her and named it Sirius, after the star in the constellation Canis Major, which was in his mind because he had just finished composing Sternklang ("Star-sound", 1971). Shortly afterward, he chanced upon a passage in a book by Jakob Lorber describing Sirius as the sun at the center of our universe, and this fired his imagination:

Other snippets of vitally important information then came to me through a couple of revelatory dreams. Crazy dreams, from which it emerged that not only did I come from Sirius itself, but that, in fact, I completed my musical education there.

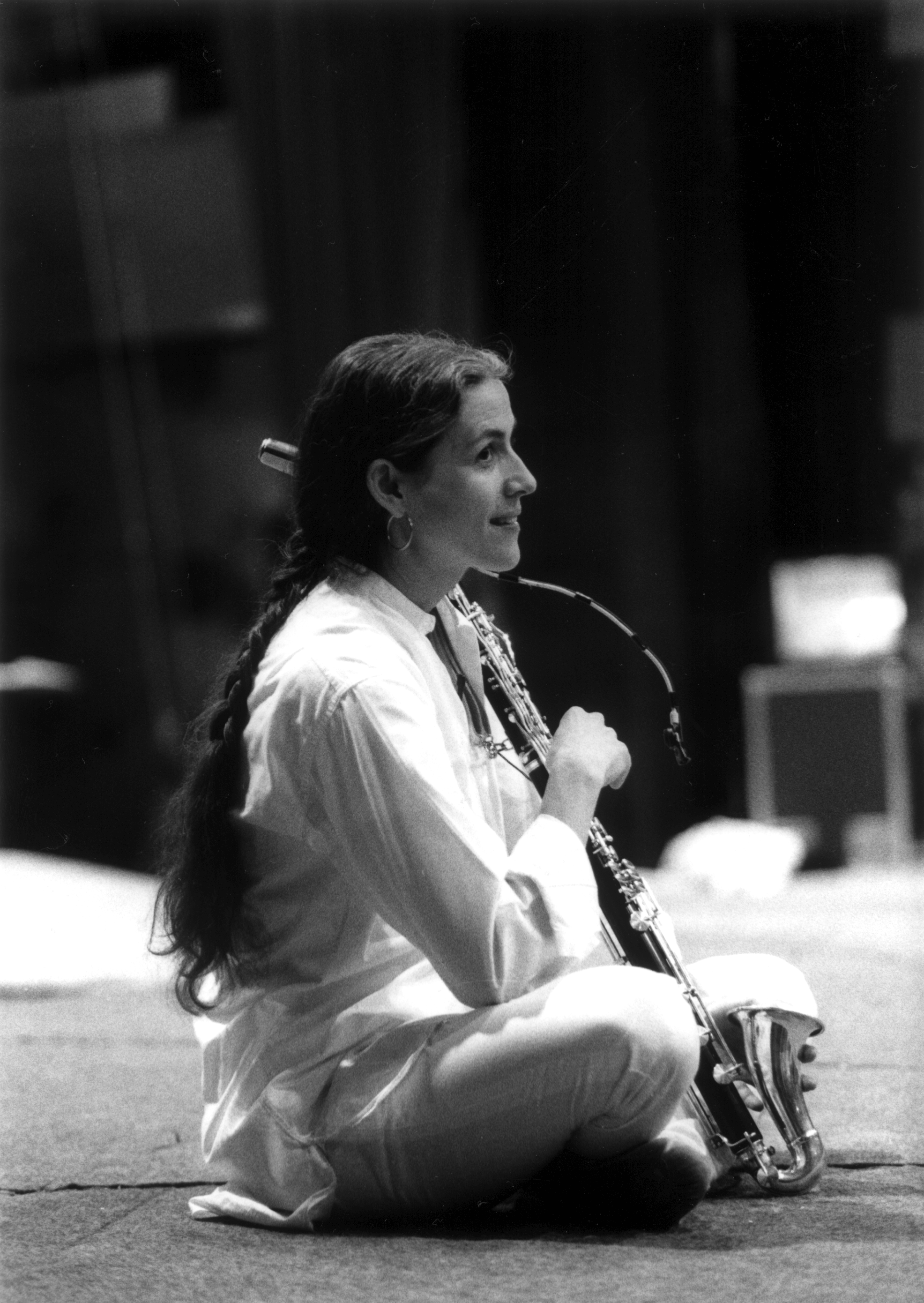
Suzanne Stephens (shown with a basset horn) created the bass clarinet part in Sirius

Stockhausen never explained these dreams in detail, maintaining that "It would lead to misunderstanding and false interpretation". In the composer’s imagination, for beings from the planets of the Sirius system, "everything is music, or the art of co-ordination and harmony of vibrations. ... The art is very highly developed there, and every composition on Sirius is related to the rhythms of nature ... the seasons, the rhythms of the stars." Stockhausen’s composition therefore is based on "the cycles and rhythms of nature—of the seasons—with all of their characteristics, and to the planets, animals, and to the twelve main characters of human beings".

Sirius was commissioned by the West German government to celebrate the United States bicentenary, and is dedicated to the "American pioneers on earth and in space". Composition was begun in 1975, and the first performance was given before an invited audience at the opening of the Albert Einstein Spacearium in Washington, D.C., on 15 July 1976, though only the "summer" section had been completed by then. The "autumn" portion was added in time for performances later that year in Japan, France, Germany, and Italy. After interrupting work in order to compose the second part of his choral opera Atmen gibt das Leben and the orchestral Jubiläum, Stockhausen finished Sirius and the première of the complete form took place on 8 August 1977 at the Aix-en-Provence Festival.

== Form and content ==
Sirius is Number 43 in the composer's catalog of works, and consists of three main parts: "Presentation", "The Wheel" (subdivided into four sections, corresponding to the four seasons), and "Annunciation". The words were written by Stockhausen, except for a text by Jakob Lorber used in the Annunciation. The musical material consists of the twelve zodiac melodies of Tierkreis, Nr. 41 1/2 (1974–75), originally composed for music boxes in connection with the percussion sextet Musik im Bauch (Music in the Belly), Nr. 41 (1975). Four of these melodies are principal, each associated with one of the protagonists, and are subjected to a variety of transformations, not merely by superimposition even of metamorphosis through a system of cross-fertilization processes in which "one melody progressively assumes the features of another, as a series of mists and frosts 'borrowed' from winter will gradually transform the autumnal aspect of October from summer nostalgia into winter foreboding". The remaining eight melodies serve a subsidiary role. In the Presentation, the four characters introduce themselves and their attributes. They are:

- North (bass): Earth, Man, Night, Winter, Seed
- East (trumpet): Fire, Youth, Morning, Spring, Bud
- South (soprano): Water, Woman, Midday, Summer, Blossom
- West (bass clarinet): Air, Friend/Beloved, Evening, Autumn, Fruit.

The main, central "wheel" lasts over an hour, and can be rotated, according to the season of the performance, to produce four different forms:

- Winter version, beginning with "Capricorn"
- Spring version, beginning with "Aries"
- Summer version, beginning with "Cancer"
- Autumn version, beginning with "Libra".

The total duration of Sirius is 96 minutes.

The eight-channel electronic music was realized in the Electronic Music Studio of WDR, Cologne in 1975–77, using an EMS Synthi 100 synthesizer. The electronic music can be performed by itself, without the four soloists, and there are also three excerpted versions, each for a soloist with a specially prepared version of the electronic music: Aries, for trumpet (Nr. 43 1/2, 1980), Libra, for bass clarinet (Nr. 43 2/3), and Capricorn, for bass voice (Nr. 43 3/4).

== Discography ==
- Aries, for trumpet and electronic music. Markus Stockhausen, trumpet. Stockhausen Complete Edition CD 33 (with Klavierstück XIII: Luzifers Traum, as piano solo).
- Capricorn, for bass voice and electronic music. Nicholas Isherwood, bass. Stockhausen Complete Edition CD 59 (with Rechter Augenbrauentanz for clarinets, bass clarinets, percussionist, synthesizer player).
- Libra, for bass clarinet and electronic music. Suzanne Stephens, bass clarinet. In Music for Clarinet, Bass Clarinet, and Basset-horn. 3-CD set. Stockhausen Complete Edition CD 32.
- Sirius, electronic music with trumpet, soprano, bass clarinet and bass voice (Summer version). Markus Stockhausen, trumpet; Annette Merriweather, soprano; Suzanne Stephens, bass clarinet; Boris Carmeli, bass. Deutsche Grammophon 2-LP set 2707 122 (1980). Reissued on 2-CD set, Stockhausen Complete Edition, CD 26.
- Sirius, electronic music in 4 versions: Spring version, Summer version, Autumn version, Winter version) 8-CD set, Stockhausen Complete Edition CD 76.
