= Boris Carmeli =

Operatic bass

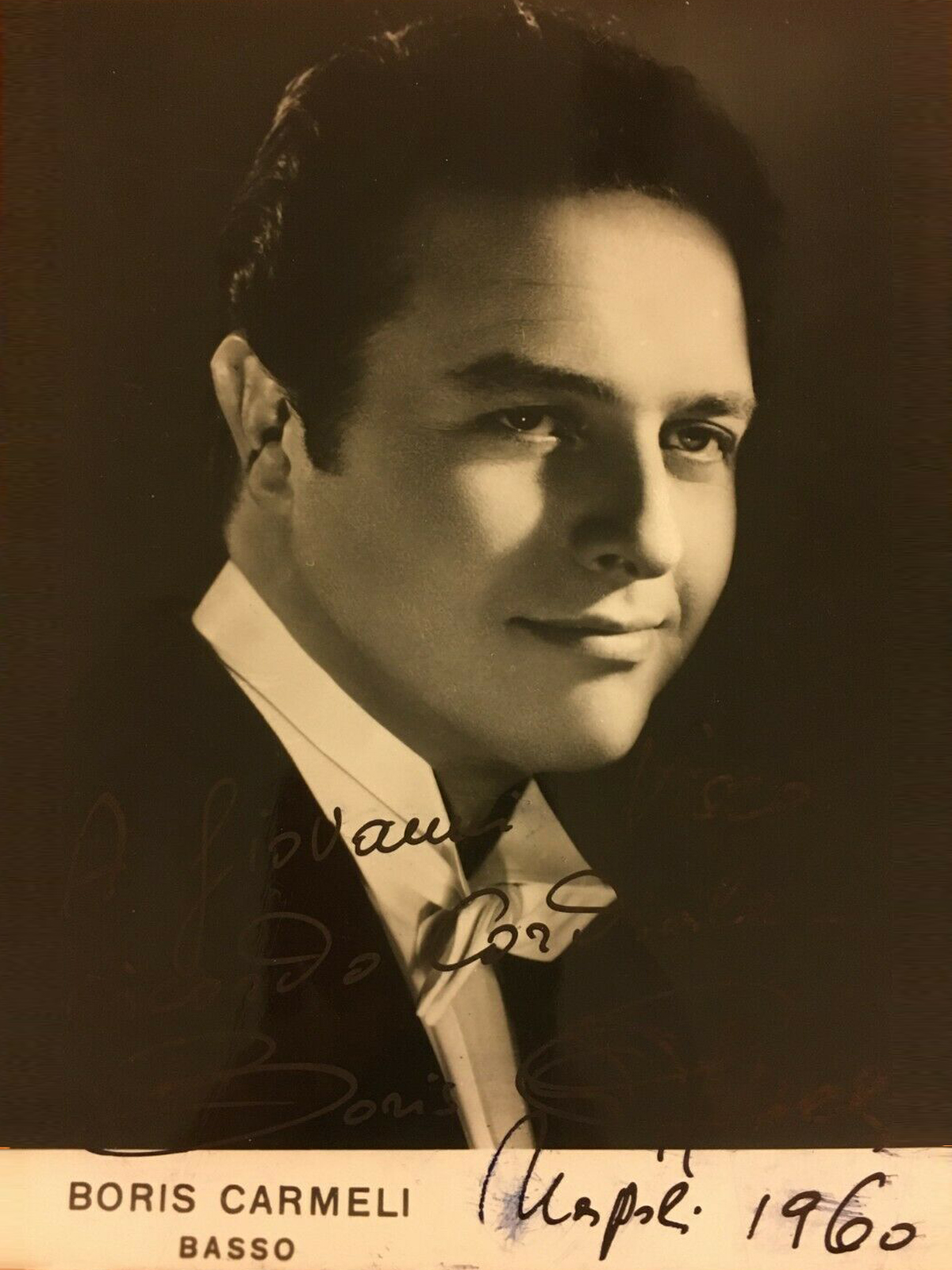
- Born: Norbert Wolfinger; 23 April 1928; Obertyn, Poland
- Died: 31 July 2009 (aged 81); Bern, Switzerland
- Occupation: Operatic bass

Boris Carmeli (23 April 1928 – 31 July 2009) was a Polish operatic basso profondo known for his "fervent rich hued tones" and extensive repertory of more than 70 operas and 60 oratorios. During his long career, he appeared regularly at La Scala in Milan and other major opera houses internationally. In addition to the classical bass repertoire, he performed contemporary music including major works by Krzysztof Penderecki and Karlheinz Stockhausen. He appeared at international music festivals, on Italian television, and in many opera films.

== Early life ==
Carmeli was born Norbert Wolfinger to Hermann and Rachel Wolfinger in Obertyn, Poland, in 1928. His older brother Pinkas (later Peter Carmeli) was born in 1921. Believing that Germany had an economic future, the family emigrated to Magdeburg in 1932. Hermann moved first and found work in the textile business. His wife and sons joined him later.

From January 1933, under the Nazi regime, the Jewish Wolfinger family faced difficulties. Growing anti-Semitism in the country even affected five-year-old Boris (Norbert), who as the only Jew in his class was subject to bigotry. The pogrom of Kristallnacht in 1938 made clear that the family was not safe in Germany. Converting their assets into jewelry, which Rachel sewed into their clothing, they fled to Brussels, Belgium.

In 1940, the German Army attacked Belgium, Luxembourg and the Netherlands. Once again, the family escaped, taking flight to France, then Italy, where they lived in a series of increasingly remote mountain villages. Roundups of Jews in the region began in September 1943. Suffering from an earache, Carmeli, then 15 years of age, descended into the town of Valdieri during daylight hours in search of medicine. Leaving the pharmacy, he was arrested by Italian fascist militiamen, who delivered him to the Germans. On 7 December 1943, he was transferred from the Borgo San Dalmazzo concentration camp to Auschwitz concentration camp. Of the 1,000 Jews on convoy 64, he would be one of 50 survivors.

Carmeli spent nearly two years in Auschwitz. As the Russian Army approached the camp in 1945, he was moved to Dora-Mittelbau and then to Bergen-Belsen. The British Army's 11th Armoured Division liberated Bergen-Belsen on 15 April of that year. Carmeli weighed 81 pounds (37 kg).

== After the War ==
Following World War II, Carmeli, pretending to be French, was repatriated to Paris. By chance, he met a cousin there and with her help was able to rejoin his parents and brother. They had survived the war by hiding in Rome; his mother and father were living there still. His brother had relocated to Tel Aviv. The whole family ultimately reunited in Israel. Carmeli worked in a music shop, learned Hebrew and began piano and singing lessons. Opera had been his professed passion since early childhood, though he reportedly was disappointed to learn he was a bass and not a tenor.

In 1950, he received two offers for study abroad. Mezzo-soprano Jennie Tourel, for whom he had auditioned, invited him to New York. The second offer, won in a competition among 300 Israeli singers, was an opportunity to study in Milan. He chose the Italian option and set off with $400 from his father. The money was to last him a year, but a year was not long enough to establish an opera career.

With the help of Astorre Mayer, paper mill owner and the honorary Israeli consul in Milan, Carmeli was able to extend his studies. Mayer hired the young singer to work part-time as his secretary at the consulate.

Carmeli studied bel canto with Ubaldo Carrozzo and Giovanni Binetti in Milan, then at the Conservatorio Rossini in Pesaro, and finally with Maria Cascioli in Rome.

== Career ==
Carmeli made his professional debut in 1956 at a music festival in Bologna's Arena Faenza. He performed the role of the philosopher Colline in Puccini's La bohème. Impressed, leading Italian opera conductor Tullio Serafin brought the singer to La Scala in Milan.

Carmeli went on to perform in world-renowned opera houses with most of the leading conductors of his day, including Herbert von Karajan, Zubin Mehta, Leonard Bernstein, Riccardo Muti, Lorin Maazel, John Barbirolli, Yehudi Menuhin and Mstislav Rostropovich. In publicity photos made at La Scala and other venues, he is shown in the roles of Sarastro in Mozart's Die Zauberflöte, Galitsky and Khan Konchak from Borodin's Prince Igor, Marcello in Meyerbeer's Les Huguenots, and Leporello in Mozart's Don Giovanni. He appeared at La Scala in Mozart's Great Mass in C minor in 1960 and in Schönberg's Die Jakobsleiter in 1962.In 1969, he is Narbal in Les Troyens conducted by Georges Prêtre.

In contemporary music, he also created the role of 9th anchoret at the 1973 Salzburg Festival in the world premiere of Orff's De temporum fine comoedia. In 1984, he appeared at the same festival as Julian Pinelli in a concert performance of Schreker's Die Gezeichneten. He appeared as Moloch in the European premiere of Penderecki's Paradise Lost conducted by the composer at La Scala in 1979. Carmeli created the North character in Stockhausen's Sirius in 1978, a composition commissioned by the West German government to celebrate the United States Bicentennial, and dedicated to "American pioneers on earth and in space". He also appeared in world premieres of contemporary Italian operas by Bruno Bartolozzi, Salvatore Allegra and Luciano Chailly.

In 1997, Carmeli premiered the narrator role in Penderecki's Seventh Symphony "Seven Gates of Jerusalem", commissioned to commemorate the city's third millennium. Penderecki, with whom Carmeli had a close friendship and working relationship, wrote the part for him in Hebrew based on Chapter 37 of the Book of Ezekiel. Until his death in 2009, Carmeli took part in almost every listed production of the work. He also appears in numerous recordings of the piece. Naxos Records' 2007 version was nominated for a Grammy Award. He was scheduled to reprise the part in Poland in August 2009, but died shortly before the event. A critic reviewing the WERGO recording, the first of Penderecki's original version, wrote, "The importance of Boris Carmeli's contribution to this work can't be over-emphasized: the basso's speaking voice is eerie and quite unique... In both the CD and DVD recordings... he makes an incredible, unforgettable impression."

Carmeli was a frequent guest artist at international music festivals such as Berliner Festwochen, Wiener Festwochen, Maggio Musicale Fiorentino, Sagra Musicale Umbra in Perugia, and the Festival d'Aix-en-Provence, among others.

He sang on Italian television and starred in a number of opera films, including Puccini's Turandot with Birgit Nilsson from La Scala, The Life of Puccini, and Rossini's La scala di seta. Carmeli also provided the singing voice for the character Ilya Ziloev in Fellini's 1983 film And the Ship Sails On. At roughly the same time, he sang for Pope John Paul II at the Vatican. Carmeli continued concert appearances until the early 1990s.

== Discography ==
Boris Carmeli appears on the following recordings:

- Boris Godunov (Mussorgsky), Orchestra of the Teatro La Fenice, conductor Jerzy Semkow
- Choral Music by J. S. Bach / Antonio Vivaldi, RAI Chorus and Symphony Orchestra, conductor Hermann Scherchen
- De temporum fine comoedia (Carl Orff), Kölner Rundfunk-Sinfonie-Orchester, conductor Herbert von Karajan
- Die Verurteilung des Lukullus, Paul Dessau, Leipzig Radio Symphony Orchestra, conductor Herbert Kegel
- Ernest Ansermet and The Ballets Russes, L'orchestre de la Suisse Romande, conductor Ernest Ansermet
- Bach: Magnificat, BWV 243 (Milan 1963) / Actus tragicus, BWV 106, Orchestra Sinfonica di Torino Della RAI, conductor Hermann Scherchen (Turin 1958)
- La scala di seta (Rossini), Orchestra Filarmonica di Roma, conductor Franco Ferrara
- Le prophète (Meyerbeer), Orchestra Sinfonica di Torino della RAI, conductor Henry Lewis (Turin 1970)
- Les Troyens (Berlioz), RAI National Symphony Orchestra, conductor Georges Prêtre 1969
- Mass, for Soloists, Chorus & Orchestra, Op. 21 (Wolfgang von Schweinitz, Berlin Radio Symphony Orchestra, conductor Uwe Gronostay
- Requiem (Verdi), NDR Symphony Orchestra, conductor Hans Schmidt-Isserstedt
- Odd Opera, Various
- Pulcinella (Stravinsky), L'Orchestre de la Suisse Romande, conductor Ernest Ansermet
- Renaud François, Ensemble 2E2M, conductor Paul Méfano
- Sirius, (Stockhausen), conductor Karlheinz Stockhausen
- Snap Shots, Various
- Stravinsky: Ballets, Stage Works, Orchestral Works, L'Orchestre de la Suisse Romande, conductor Ernest Ansermet
- Symphony No. 7 "Seven Gates of Jerusalem" (Penderecki), Warsaw Philharmonic, conductor Antoni Wit
- Symphony 6 "Desiderata", Op. 70 / Alpha-Zeta, Op. 54 / Pater Noster, Op. 51 (Carlos Veerhoff), Chor des Mitteldeutschen Rundfunks, conductor Leopold Hager
- Utrenja / Utrenja II (Penderecki), Kölner Rundfunk-Sinfonie-Orchester, conductor Andrzej Markowski
- Vox Humana? / Finale / Fürst Igor, Strawinsky (Mauricio Kagel), Ensemble 2e2m, conductor Paul Méfano
- Zeitgenössische Musik in der Bundesrepublik Deutschland 10 (1970–1980)

== Personal life ==
Carmeli lived in Italy for most of his post-war life. In 1961, on a trip to perform at the San Francisco Opera, he met and married Sonja Moser, a Swiss woman working in the fashion industry. Unlike many Holocaust survivors, he never revisited the sites of the horrors of his youth.
