= Oktophonie =

1991 composition by Karlheinz Stockhausen

- Electronic Music of TUESDAY from LIGHT
- by Karlheinz Stockhausen
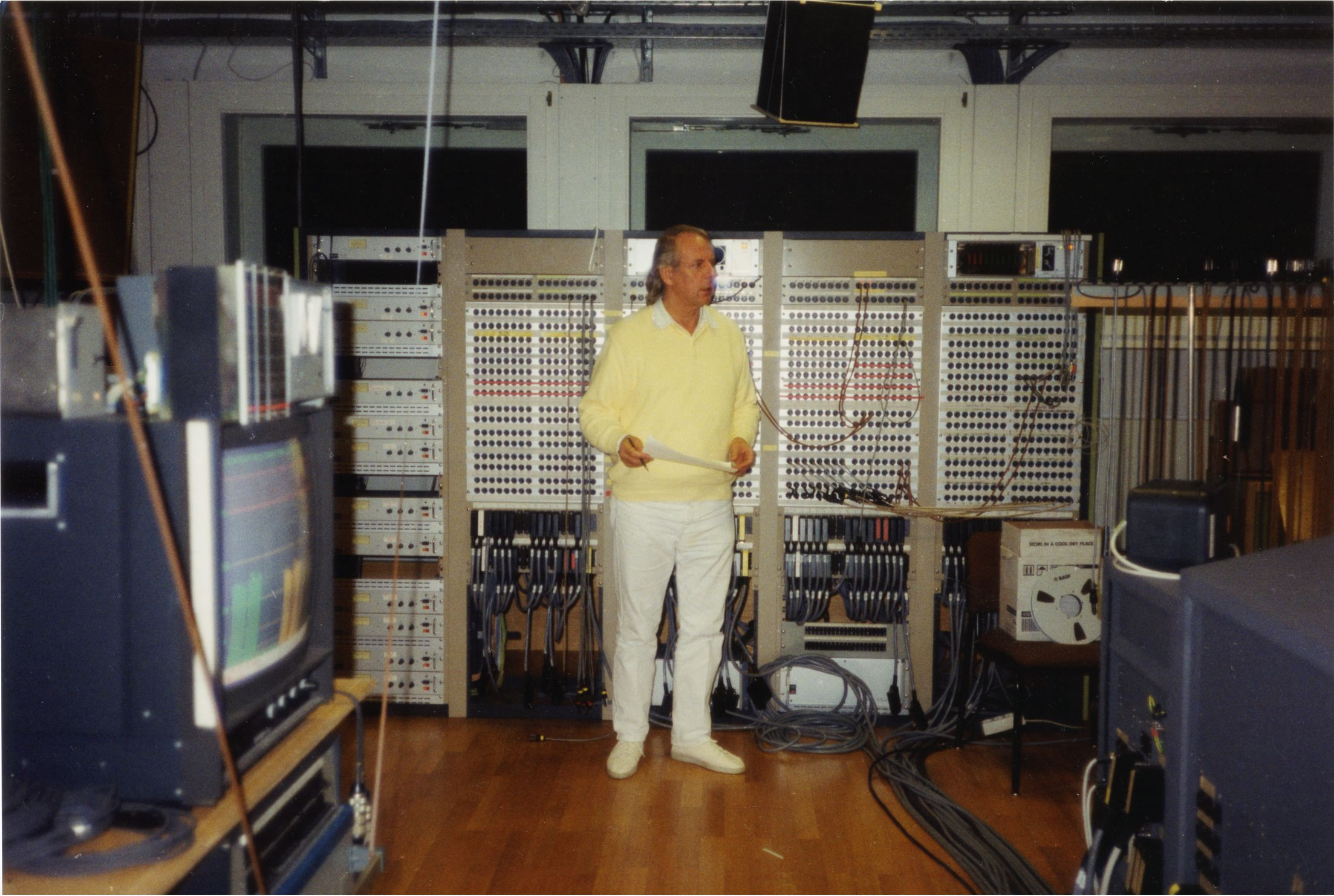
- Stockhausen in the WDR studio during the production of Oktophonie in 1991.
- English: Octophony
- Catalogue: 255
- Opus: 1. ex 61
- Year: 1991
- Genre: Electronic music
- Related: Dienstag aus Licht: Invasion mit Explosion
- Composed: 23 August 1990 – 30 August 1991: Cologne
- Performed: 29 September 1991: Frankfurt
- Publisher: Stockhausen-Verlag
- Recorded: 1994
- Duration: 69:00
- Scoring: 8-track tape
- Vocal: Soprano, bass
- Instrumental: Synthesizer

Premiere
- Date: 1994
- Location: Cologne Triennial

Oktophonie (Octophony) is a 1991 octophonic electronic-music composition by Karlheinz Stockhausen. A component layer of act 2 of the opera Dienstag aus Licht, it may also be performed as an independent composition. It has a duration of 69 minutes.

== Background ==
Oktophonie is the accompaniment for the onstage action in act 2 of Dienstag aus Licht. During "Invasion—Explosion mit Abschied" (Invasion—Explosion with Farewell), the musicians synchronize their performances to the pre-recorded tape of Oktophonie. In order to balance their live performances with the taped synthesizers, all of the performers wear wireless microphones. This became a standard performance practice for Stockhausen after Dienstag.

== Form ==
Like everything in Licht, the music of Oktophonie is developed from Stockhausen's superformula. The music has eight layers which move independently. Because act 2 of Dienstag depicts a battle between Michael and Lucifer, the music of Oktophonie evokes the sounds of battle. Much of the synthesizer material is dominated by drones. The more frenetic sounds on the tape are characterized by Stockhausen as shots, crashes, and sound bombs. They whizz around the audience and arc over their heads as if they are seated on a battlefield instead of an opera house. There is no real danger as all the munitions are musical.

The sound bombs are dropped by airplanes in Stockhausen's conception. The shots are delivered by flak, and crashes occur when the anti-aircraft guns hit their marks. Inside the sound cube of Oktophonie, most of the bombs fall in the rear away from the stage. The shots generally originate in the lower speakers, often in the front. The crashes cartoonishly corkscrew down to the ground, a movement Stockhausen gleefully controlled in the studio.

== Materials and technique ==
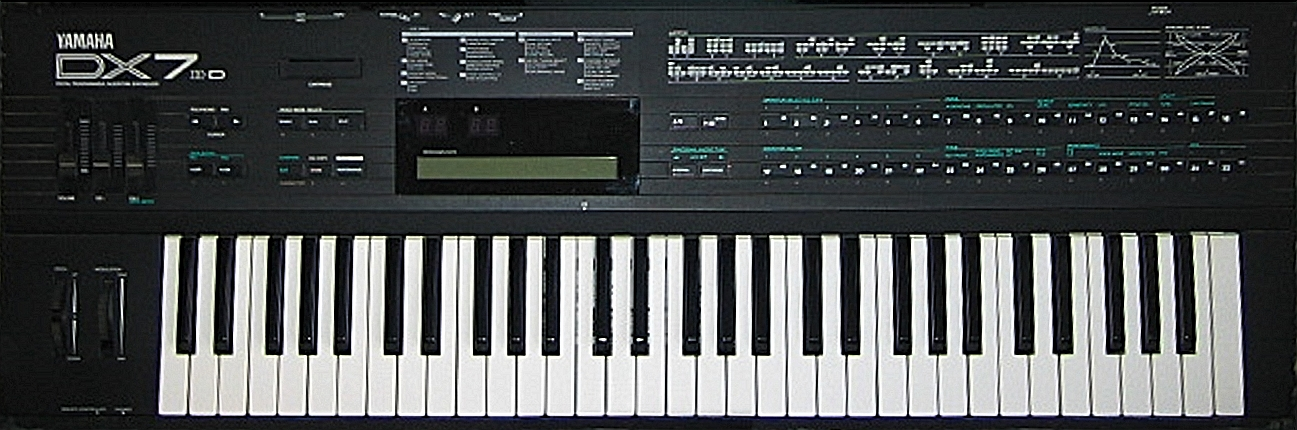
Yamaha DX7-II synthesizer

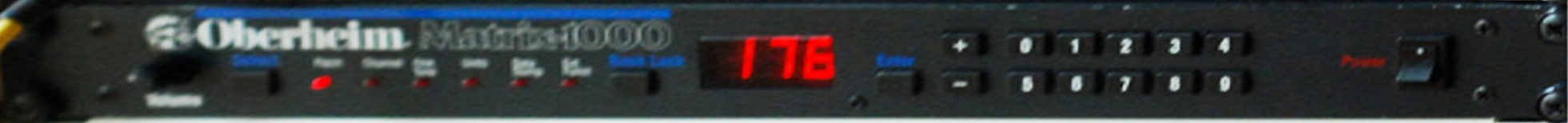
Oberheim Matrix 1000 synthesizer module

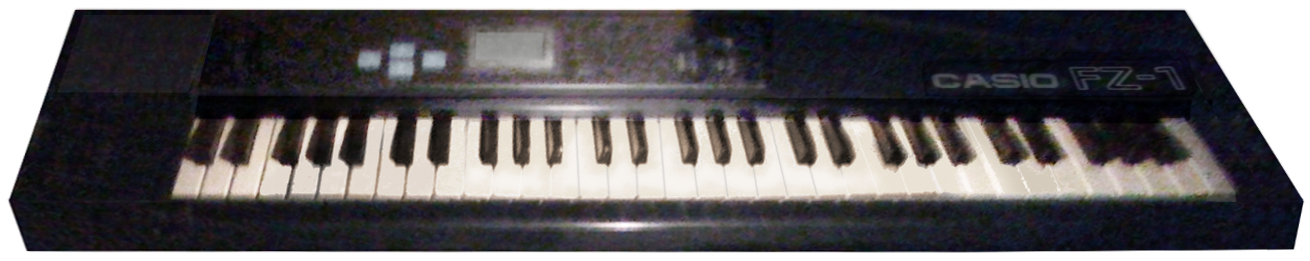
Casio FZ-1 sampler

Oktophonie was realised in the Studio for Electronic Music of the Westdeutscher Rundfunk, Cologne, in two phases of work: from 23 August to 30 November 1990, and from 5 to 30 August 1991. Studio collaborators were recording engineers Volker Müller and Daniel Velasco-Schwarzenberger, and recording technician Gertrud Melcher. Production was made using a single 24-track tape recorder. A number of synthesizers and modules were used in the production of the sound layers:

- two Yamaha DX7II-FD synthesizers
- two Casio FZ-1 samplers
- a Roland D-50 synthesizer
- an Oberheim Matrix-1000 synthesizer module (without keyboard)
- an ART Proverb effects unit
- a Roland SDE 2000 reverberation unit
- a Roland SVC-350 vocoder
- an Atari ST computer
- C-Lab Unitor Hardware and Notator Software
- a Yamaha MR 12/4/2 mixing console

In addition, an EMS Synthi 100 was used for control of the spatialization in some layers during the concluding portion.

Octophonic speaker plot. Each corner of the cube contains a sound channel

The last step in composing Okotphonie required spatializing the music over the eight sound channels. The channels are arranged around the audience in a cube, with each corner of the cube containing a cluster of speakers. Each channel ideally has two speakers hung at different angles in order to create the illusions of sonic movement that Stockhausen composed. This speaker array creates six different planes of sound above, below, and around the audience.

In the early 1970s, Stockhausen worked with Peter Zinovieff at Electronic Music Studios (EMS) to develop a QUEG (Quadrophonic Effect Generator). The QUEG only had four outputs. So Stockhausen also relied on a Yamaha Pro Audio Digital Mixing Processor 7 (DMP7) to complete the octophonic spatialization.

The analog tape at WDR could not contain the full 69 minutes of Oktophonie. Stockhausen split it between two tapes with a bridge.

== Notable performances ==
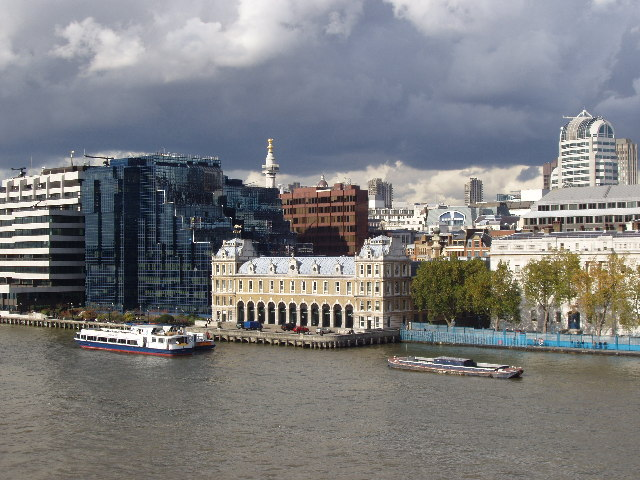
Old Billingsgate Fish Market, London, where Stockhausen performed Oktophonie on 25 October 2005

- 1991: World premiere, 29 September, Frankfurt, in the context of the concert premiere of Dienstag aus Licht, given as the conclusion of the Frankfurt Feste '91
- 1993: in the context of the staged world premiere of Dienstag, 28 May, Leipzig Opera
- 1994: World premiere of the electronic music alone, 12 June, at the restaurant of the Koelnmesse in Cologne-Deutz, organised by the Westdeutscher Rundfunk as part of the Kölner Trienniale
- 1998: South American premiere, São Paulo, Brazil, at the International Festival of Electroacoustic Music of São Paulo (BIMESP), held 8–17 October
- 2002: Neue Nationalgalerie at the Kulturforum, Berlin
- 2002: Stockhausen Courses, Kürten
- 2004: Sonorities Festival, Queen's University Belfast, Sonic Arts Research Centre, Belfast, Northern Ireland, Sunday 25 April
- 2005: Triptych Festival, Queen's Hall, Edinburgh, Saturday 30 April
- 2005: West Coast Festival of Numusic 2005, Tou Old Brewery, Stavanger, Norway, Friday 26 August
- 2005: Frieze Festival, Old Billingsgate Market, London, 25 October
- 2007: Stockhausen Courses, Kürten, 15 July
- 2008: Fromm Players at Harvard: 60 Years of Electronic Music, 8 March
- 2008: Stockhausen Courses, Kürten, 7 July
- 2009: Durham University Musicon series, Music and Electronics, 19 March
- 2009: version with soloists (Signale zur Invasion with Ben Marks, trombone; Pietà with Tristram Williams, flugelhorn, and Jessica Aszodi, soprano; Synthi-Fou with Michael Fowler, electronic keyboards):
  - Turbine Hall, Brisbane Powerhouse, Brisbane, Australia, 25 April
  - Sydney Conservatorium of Music, as part of Smart Light Sydney Festival (a component of Vivid Sydney), Sydney Australia, Saturday, 6 June
- 2009: Stockhausen Courses, Kürten, 14 July
- 2010: Paris, 26 March, two performances, avec le soutien technique de Diversity, 4:00pm and 9:00pm, Atelier 4, Cent Quatre, 104 rue d'Aubervilliers
- 2011: Version with soloists (Signale zur Invasion with Andrew Digby, trombone; Pietà with Marco Blaauw, flugelhorn, and Agata Zubel, soprano; Synthi-Fou with Antonio Pérez-Abellán, electronic keyboards), sound projection: Kathinka Pasveer. Stockhausen Courses, Sülztalhalle, Kürten, 9 August
- 2013: Park Avenue Armory, New York City, 9 performances, sound projection: Kathinka Pasveer; design: Rirkrit Tiravanija

== Discography ==
- Stockhausen: Oktophonie. Stockhausen Complete Edition CD 41. Kürten: Stockhausen-Verlag, 1994.

As accompaniment:

- Stockhausen: Dienstag aus Licht. Annette Meriweather (soprano); Julian Pike (tenor); Nicholas Isherwood (bass); Markus Stockhausen (trumpet and flugelhorn); Michael Svoboda (trombone); Massimiliano Viel, Simon Stockhausen (synthesizers); Andreas Boettger, Renee Jonker (percussion); WDR Choir, Karlheinz Stockhausen (cond.). Stockhausen Complete Edition CD 40A–B. Kürten: Stockhausen-Verlag, 1996.
- Stockhausen: Solo-Synthi-Fou; Synthi-Fou; Dienstags-Abschied; Klangfarben für Synthi-Fou. Simon Stockhausen (synthesizers); WDR Choir, Karlheinz Stockhausen (cond.). Stockhausen Complete Edition CD 42 A–B. Kürten: Stockhausen-Verlag, 1994.
- Stockhausen: Michaels-Ruf; Bassettsu; Synthi-Fou; Quitt; Komet; Trompetent. Stockhausen Complete Edition CD 82. Kürten: Stockhausen-Verlag, 2007.
