= Nicolas Becker =

Nicolas Becker may refer to:

- Nicolas Becker (jurist) (born 1946), German jurist and criminal defense lawyer
- Nicolas Becker (sound engineer), French composer and sound engineer
- Nicolas Léonard Beker (1770–1840), or Becker, French general

== See also ==
- Nikolaus Becker (1809–1845), German lawyer and writer
