= Colette Lorand =

Swiss operatic soprano (1923–2019)

- Born: Colette Grauaug; 7 January 1923; Zürich, Switzerland
- Died: 26 April 2019 (aged 96); Ebenhausen (Schäftlarn)
- Education: Musikhochschule Hannover
- Occupation: Operatic soprano
- Organizations: Theater Basel; Frankfurt Opera; Hamburg State Opera

Colette Lorand (7 January 1923 – 26 April 2019) was a Swiss operatic soprano who made an international career. Known as a coloratura soprano, she created several roles in world premieres, including Sibylle in Carl Orff's De temporum fine comoedia in 1973 at the Salzburg Festival, and Regan in Aribert Reimann's Lear at the Nationaltheater München in 1978, also in the French premiere of this opera in Paris in 1982.

== Career ==
Born Colette Grauaug in Zürich, she grew up in a musical family. Her grandmother had been a celebrated singer in Hungary. Colette studied at the Musikhochschule Hannover, later privately with Melitta Hirzel in Zürich.

She made her operatic debut in 1945 at the Theater Basel as Marguerite in Gounod's Faust. She was a member of the ensemble of the Frankfurt Opera from 1951 to 1956. She appeared in coloratura soprano roles such as the Queen of the Night in Mozart's Die Zauberflöte in the first performance in the new building of the Hamburg State Opera. She was a member of the house from 1955 to 1957 and from 1960 to 1969. In the 1963/64 season, she appeared as Frau Fluth in a new production of Otto Nicolai's Die lustigen Weiber von Windsor staged by Boleslaw Barlog. She also performed the role of Eva in Wagner's Die Meistersinger von Nürnberg, changing to more dramatic roles. She sang at the Vienna State Opera, as Violetta in Verdi's La Traviata and again as the Queen of the Night. In Lisbon, she appeared in 1961 at the Teatro Nacional de São Carlos as Konstanze in Mozart's Die Entführung aus dem Serail.

Lorand performed in several world premieres, including in 1966 in Hamburg in Boris Blacher's Zwischenfälle bei einer Notladung, in 1972 in Berlin in Wolfgang Fortner's Elisabeth Tudor, and in 1973 at the Salzburg Festival in Carl Orff's De temporum fine comoedia. In July 1978, she appeared at the Nationaltheater München as Regan in Aribert Reimann's Lear. She performed the role also in the premiere in France in November 1982 at the Paris Opera in the translation by Antoinette Becker.

Lorand appeared in 20th-century operas by Frank Martin, Hans Werner Henze and Krzysztof Penderecki, among others. She performed the role of Lady Madeline in the reconstruction of Debussy's La Chute de la Maison Usher by Juan Allende-Blin, when it premiered at the Staatsoper Unter den Linden on 5 October 1979, conducted by Jesus Lopez Cobos.

Her work was recorded by broadcasters and on records. She appeared in an opera film of Elektra by Richard Strauss, as the Overseer, alongside Leonie Rysanek in the title role. The film was directed in 1981 by Götz Friedrich and conducted by Karl Böhm.

In the 1981/82 season, she performed in Basel the role of Emilia Marty in Janáček's Die Sache Makropoulos. In this role, she retired from the stage in 1983.
