= Júlia Várady =

Hungarian-born German soprano (born 1941)

- Born: Tőzsér Júlia; 1 September 1941; Nagyvárad, Hungary
- Education: Conservatory in Cluj; Ciprian Porumbescu Conservatory
- Occupations: Operatic mezzo-soprano and soprano; Academic teacher
- Organizations: Hochschule für Musik Hanns Eisler; Deutsche Oper Berlin
- Spouse: Dietrich Fischer-Dieskau (m. 1977–2012)

Júlia Várady (born 1 September 1941) is a Hungarian-born German soprano who started out as a mezzo-soprano. She performed internationally at major opera houses and festivals.

== Life and career ==
She was born Tőzsér Júlia in Nagyvárad, Hungary (today Oradea, Romania) on 1 September 1941. Her father was Hungarian and her mother a German from Transylvania. At the age of six she began violin lessons at the Conservatory in Cluj and then, aged fourteen, voice training with Emilia Popp. She later studied voice with Arta Florescu at the Ciprian Porumbescu Conservatory in Bucharest.

She made her debut, as a mezzo-soprano, with the Cluj Opera in 1962, in Gluck's Orfeo ed Euridice.

In 1970, she joined the Oper Frankfurt where she appeared as Antonia in Offenbach's Les contes d'Hoffmann, as Elisabetta in Verdi's Don Carlo and as Donna Elvira in Mozart's Don Giovanni. She performed as a guest at the Cologne Opera as Fiordiligi in Mozart's Così fan tutte and in the title role of Verdi's La traviata. She portrayed Vitellia in Mozart's La clemenza di Tito at the 1973 Munich Opera Festival and then became a member of the ensemble of the Bavarian State Opera. She was admired there as Lady Macbeth in Verdi's Macbeth. She appeared at the 1975 Munich Opera Festival as Elettra in Mozart's Idomeneo. Other roles in Munich included Santuzza in Mascagni's Cavalleria rusticana, the title roles of Verdi's La traviata and Aida, and Puccini's Madama Butterfly. She performed also as Verdi's Leonora in La forza del destino, Puccini's Liu in Turandot and Wagner's Senta in Der fliegende Holländer. She later joined the Deutsche Oper Berlin, where she performed as the Countess in Mozart's Le nozze di Figaro in 1978, as Aida in 1982, as Sieglinde in Wagner's Die Walküre on a 1987 tour of the company to Japan, as Desdemona in Verdi's Otello in 1991, as Elisabeth in Wagner's Tannhäuser in 1992 and as Senta in 1994.

She appeared internationally as a guest, performing the title role of Gluck's Alceste at the Edinburgh Festival in 1974. She performed at the Salzburg Festival as Elettra in 1976, as Vitellia in 1977, and as Donna Elvira in 1987. She performed as Elvira at the Metropolitan Opera in New York in 1977, and as Elettra at La Scala in Milan in 1984. She appeared at the Royal Opera House in London in 1987 as Desdemona in Verdi's Otello and in 1992 as Senta. She performed as Abigaille in Verdi's Nabucco at the Opéra Bastille in Paris in 1995, and as Leonora in Verdi's Il trovatore at the Vienna State Opera in 1996.

Várady was married to the German baritone Dietrich Fischer-Dieskau from 1977 until his death in 2012. In 1978 she created the role of Cordelia in the world premiere of Aribert Reimann's opera Lear in Munich, alongside her husband in the title role. In 1998, she retired from opera. She is currently a guest professor at the Hochschule für Musik Hanns Eisler in Berlin.

== Roles ==
Várady performed most roles on stage. Roles that she sang only in the studio (such as the Empress in Strauss's Die Frau ohne Schatten) or in concert performances (such as Leonore in Beethoven's Fidelio and Fidelia in Puccini's Edgar) are not included.

- Bartók: Judit in Bluebeard's Castle
- Bizet: Micaëla in Carmen
- Borodin: Konchakovna in Prince Igor
- Gluck:
  - Alceste
  - Orfeo in Orfeo ed Euridice
- Gounod: Marguerite in Faust
- Handel: Ginevra in Ariodante
- Mascagni: Santuzza in Cavalleria rusticana
- Mozart:
  - Elettra in Idomeneo
  - Susanna, Cherubino and Countess in Le nozze di Figaro
  - Elvira and Anna in Don Giovanni
  - Fiordiligi in Così fan tutte
  - Vitellia in La clemenza di Tito
  - Pamina in Die Zauberflöte
- Offenbach: Giulietta and Antonia in Les contes d'Hoffmann
- Puccini:
  - Cio-Cio-San and Kate Pinkerton in Madama Butterfly
  - Giorgetta in Il tabarro
  - Liù in Turandot
- Reimann: Cordelia in Lear
- Rossini:
  - Angelina in La Cenerentola
  - Adèle in Le Comte Ory

- Schönberg: Girl in Moses und Aron
- J. Strauss:
  - Saffi in Der Zigeunerbaron
  - Rosalinde in Die Fledermaus
- R. Strauss:
  - Arabella
  - Composer in Ariadne auf Naxos
- Tchaikovsky:
  - Tatyana in Eugene Onegin
  - Lisa in The Queen of Spades
- Verdi:
  - Abigaille and Fenena in Nabucco
  - Leonora in Il trovatore
  - Violetta in La traviata
  - Leonora in La forza del destino
  - Amelia in Un ballo in maschera
  - Thibault and Élisabeth in Don Carlos
  - Aida
  - Desdemona in Otello
- Wagner:
  - Irene in Rienzi
  - Senta in Der fliegende Holländer
  - Eva in Die Meistersinger von Nürnberg
  - Freia in Das Rheingold
  - Siegrune and Sieglinde in Die Walküre

== Recordings ==
- Julia Varady: Song of Passion – DVD (documentary and recordings of live performances) EMI Classics
- Bartok: Bluebeard's Castle, with Fischer-Dieskau and Wolfgang Sawallisch, cond. - CD, 1979. Deutsche Grammophon
- Richard Strauss: Arias from Salome, Ariadne, Danae, Capriccio – CD. Bamberg Symphony, Fischer-Dieskau, conductor, Orfeo
- Giacomo Puccini: Arias from Madama Butterfly, Tosca, La bohème, La rondine, Gianni Schicchi, Manon Lescaut, Turandot, Suor Angelica – CD, 1995. Berlin Radio Symphony Orchestra, Marcello Viotti, cond., Orfeo
- Tchaikowsky: Arias from Eugene Onegin, The Maid of Orleans, Mazeppa, The Sorceress (The Enchantress), The Queen of Spades, Iolanta – CD, 2000. Munich Radio Orchestra, Roman Kofman, cond, Orfeo
- Wagner: Wesendonck Lieder and arias from Tristan und Isolde, Götterdämmerung – CD, 1997. Deutsches Symphonie-Orchester Berlin, Fischer-Dieskau, conductor, Orfeo
- Verdi Heroines, arias from Nabucco, II Trovatore, La Traviata, Un Ballo In Maschera, La Forza Del Destino – CD, 1995. Bavarian State Orchestra, Fischer-Dieskau, conductor, Orfeo
- J. S. Bach: Coffee Cantata, Peasant Cantata – CD, London 11/1981, with Academy of St Martin in the Fields, Philips Digital Classics
- Mozart/Strauss Lieder – CD, Berlin, 1991, with Elena Bashkirova, piano, Orfeo
- Mozart: Don Giovanni, 1987, Karajan, Vienna Philharmonic, DVD, Telemondial/Sony.
- Mozart's Lucio Silla - Leopold Hager conducting the Mozarteum Orchestra Salzburg, 1975, Deutsche Grammophon
- Meyerbeer: Gli amori di Teolinda – CD, Berlin, 1983, RIAS Kammerchor, Radio-Symphonie-Orchester-Berlin, Jörg Fadle (clarinet) and Gerd Albrecht cond., Orfeo
- Mascagni/Leoncavallo: Cavalleria Rusticana/Pagliacci, CD, 1978. Decca
