= Lear (opera) =

1978 opera by Aribert Reimann

- Opera by Aribert Reimann
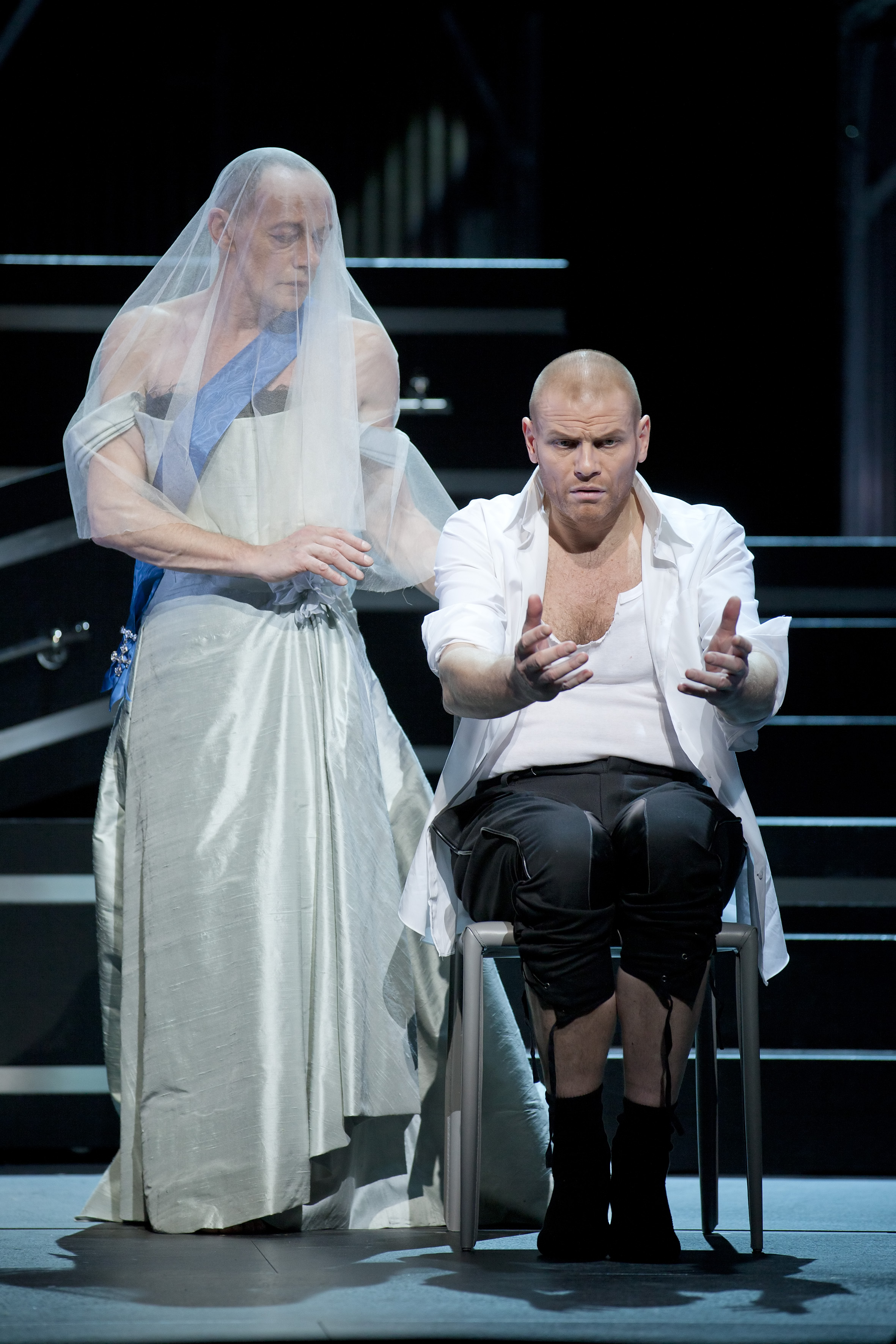
- Erwin Leder as the Fool and Bo Skovhus as Lear in a 2012 production at the Hamburg State Opera
- Librettist: Claus H. Henneberg
- Language: German
- Based on: King Lear by William Shakespeare
- Premiere: 9 July 1978; National Theatre Munich

Lear is an opera in two parts with music by the German composer Aribert Reimann, and a libretto by Claus H. Henneberg, based on Shakespeare's tragedy King Lear.

== Background and performance history ==
Reimann wrote the title role specifically for the baritone Dietrich Fischer-Dieskau, who had suggested the subject to the composer as early as 1968. Reimann then received a commission from the Bavarian State Opera in 1975. The world premiere, in a production by Jean-Pierre Ponnelle with Fischer-Dieskau in the title role, occurred at the National Theatre Munich on 9 July 1978, with Gerd Albrecht conducting.

The production was revived in Munich in 1980. The US premiere, in English translation, was presented by the San Francisco Opera in June 1981, with Thomas Stewart as Lear, under Gerd Albrecht. The Paris premiere took place in November 1982, in a French translation by Antoinette Becker. The UK premiere was presented by English National Opera in 1989; the Swedish premiere took place at the Malmö Opera on 27 April 2013 with Fredrik Zetterström as Lear.

== Roles ==
One notable departure from operatic convention was to make the part of Lear's Fool a speaking role, rather than a sung role. In addition, compared to the Shakespeare original, the parts of Kent and Edmund, for example, have been greatly reduced.

Roles, voice types, premiere cast
Role	Voice type	Premiere cast 9 July 1978 Conductor: Gerd Albrecht
Lear	baritone	Dietrich Fischer-Dieskau
Fool	spoken role	Rolf Boysen
Goneril, daughter of Lear	dramatic soprano	Helga Dernesch
Regan, daughter of Lear	soprano	Colette Lorand
Cordelia, daughter of Lear	soprano	Júlia Várady
Duke of Albany	baritone	Hans Wilbrink
Duke of Cornwall	tenor	Georg Paskuda
King of France	bass-baritone	Karl Helm
Duke of Gloucester	bass-baritone	Hans Günter Nöcker
Edgar, son of Gloucester	tenor/countertenor	David Knutson
Edmund, illegitimate son of Gloucester	tenor	Werner Götz
Earl of Kent	tenor	Richard Holm
Servant	tenor	Markus Goritzki
Knight	spoken role	Gerhard Auer
Chorus: servants, guards, soldiers, Lear's and Gloucester's retinue

== Instrumentation ==
The orchestral score requires:

- 3 flutes (all doubling piccolo), alto flute, bass flute, 3 oboes, English horn, 2 clarinets, bass clarinet, 2 bassoons, contrabassoon
- 6 horns, 4 trumpets, 3 trombones, tuba
- percussion^{6}, 2 harps
- strings: 24 violins, 10 violas, 8 cellos, 6 double basses

== Recordings ==
- 1978: Dietrich Fischer-Dieskau, Karl Helm, Hans Wilbrink, Georg Paskuda, Richard Holm, Hans Günter Nöcker, David Knutson, Werner Götz, Helga Dernesch, Colette Lorand, Júlia Várady, Rolf Boysen, Markus Gortizki, Gerhard Auer; Bavarian State Orchestra, Chorus of the Bavarian State Opera; Gerd Albrecht, conductor. Deutsche Grammophon 463 480–2 (CD reissue)
- 2008: Wolfgang Koch, Magnus Baldvinsson, Dietrich Volle, Michael McCown, Hans-Jürgen Lazar, Johannes Martin Kränzle, Martin Wölfel, Frank van Aken, Jeanne-Michèle Charbonnet, Caroline Whisnant, Britta Stallmeister; Frankfurter Opern- und Museumsorchester, Chorus of the Frankfurt Opera, Sebastian Weigle, conductor. Oehms Classics OC 921
