= De temporum fine comoedia =

Opera-oratorio by Carl Orff

- mystery play by Carl Orff
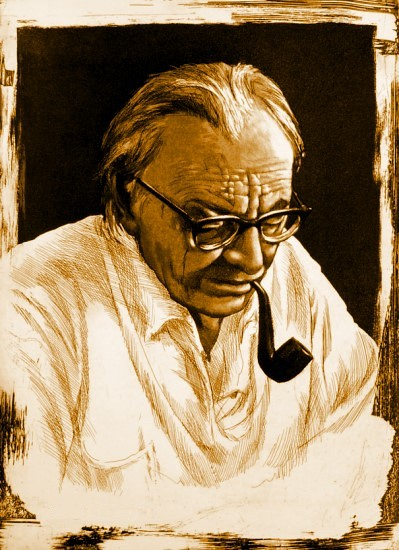
- The composer
- Translation: A Play on the End of Time
- Language: Greek; German; Latin
- Premiere: 20 August 1973; Salzburg Festival

De temporum fine comoedia (Latin for A Play on the End of Time) is a choral opera-oratorio by 20th-century German composer Carl Orff. His last large work, and a personal one, it took ten years to compile the text (1960 to 1970) and another two years to compose (1969 to 1971); he revised it in 1979 and again in 1981. Orff presents a mystery play summarizing his view of the end of time sung in Ancient Greek, Latin, and a German translation by Wolfgang Schadewaldt. De temporum fine comoedia was recorded before it was premiered. Herbert von Karajan conducted sessions from 16 to 21 July 1973 in a studio in Leverkusen-Wiesdorf, employing three choruses (the Tölzer Knabenchor, the RIAS Kammerchor and the Kölner Rundfunkchor) and the Cologne Radio Symphony Orchestra. The public and stage premiere took place at the Salzburg Festival a month later, on 20 August, with the same forces and stage direction by August Everding.

== Roles ==
Roles, voice types, premiere cast
Role	Voice type	Premiere cast, 20 August 1973 Conductor: Herbert von Karajan
1st Sibyl	soprano	Anna Tomowa-Sintow
2nd Sibyl	soprano	Colette Lorand
3rd Sibyl	soprano	Jane Marsh
4th Sibyl	soprano	Kay Griffel
5th Sibyl	soprano	Gwendolyn Killebrew
6th Sibyl	soprano	Kari Løvaas
7th Sibyl	mezzo-soprano	Heljä Angervo
8th Sibyl	mezzo-soprano	Sylvia Anderson
9th Sibyl	mezzo-soprano	Glenys Loulis
1st Anachoret	tenor	Erik Geisen
2nd Anachoret	tenor	Hans Wegmann
3rd Anachoret	baritone	Hans Helm
4th Anachoret	baritone	Wolfgang Anheisser
5th Anachoret	baritone	Siegfried Rudolf Frese
6th Anachoret	baritone	Hermann Patzalt
7th Anachoret	baritone	Hannes Jokel
8th Anachoret	bass	Anton Diakov
9th Anachoret	bass	Boris Carmeli
Voice	mezzo-soprano	Christa Ludwig
Voice	tenor	Peter Schreier
Chorus Leader	bass	Josef Greindl
Luzifer	spoken	Hartmut Forche
Prologue	spoken	Rolf Boysen

== Music ==
=== Summary/dramatis personae ===
The opera is in 3 parts, with each part having its own characters. Part 1 involves 9 Sibyls, represented by female singers.

- 3 dramatic sopranos
- 4 mezzo-sopranos
- 1 alto
- 1 deep contralto

Part 2 involves 9 anchorites, represented by male singers

- 1 tenor
- 5 baritones
- 2 basses
- 1 basso profondo

There is also a children's choir, along with a tenor section that is heard on a magnetic tape.

Part 3 involves the following roles:

- The last beings; represented by three large mixed choirs
- The choral leader, a speaking part
- Lucifer, who appears near the end, a speaking role

There is also a double chorus of sopranos and altos used near the end, as well as two soloists, tenor and contralto, to represent the "Vox Mundana". A children's choir is also used to represent the "Voces caelestes".

=== 1. Die Sibyllen (The Sibyls) ===
1. "Heis theós estin anarchos, hypermegéthaes, agénaetos" (A god is, without beginning, immense, unformed)
2. "Opse theü g’aléüsi myloi" (The mills of God are late to grind)
3. "Pasin homü nyx estin isae tois plüton echusin kai ptochois" (The same night awaits all, rich and poor)
4. "Choneusó gar hapanta kai eis katharón dialexó" (I will melt everything down and purify it)
5. "Vae! Ibunt impii in gehennam ignis eterni" (Woe! The impious shall enter the hell of the eternal fire)

=== 2. Die Anachoreten (The Anchorites) ===
6. "Upote, maepote, maepu, maedépote… ignis eterni immensa tormenta" (Never, never, in no place, at no time the measureless torment of the eternal fire)
7. "Unus solus Deus ab aeterno in aeternum" (God is One alone from eternity to eternity)
8. "Nicht Satanas... nicht Lucifer... damnatus nunquam condemnatus in aeternum" (Not Satan... not Lucifer... the damned are not condemned for eternity)
9. "Mundus terrenus volvitur" (The terrestrial world revolves)
10. "Wann endet die Zeit?" (When will time end?)
11. "Gott, schenk uns Wahrsagung, Weissagung, Hellsicht im Traum. Gott, schenk uns den Traum" (God, grant us the gifts of prophecy, sagacity, clairvoyance in dreaming. God, grant us the dream.)

=== 3. Dies illa (That Day) ===
12. "Wo irren wir ihn, verloren, verlassen" (Whither do we stray, lost, abandoned)
13. "Kyrie! Serva nos, salva nos, eripe nos!" (Lord! Help us, save us, take us away!)
14. "Angor, timor, horror, terror ac pavor invadit omnes" (Dread, fear, horror, terror and dismay seize us all)
15. "Omne genus daemoniorum caecorum, claudorum sive confusorum, attendite iussum meorum et vocationem verborum" (Every type of demon, blind, lame or mad, mark the command and the call of my words.)
16. "Vae, Portae Inferi oculus aspicit nos tenebrarius tenebris" (Woe, the eye, the dark eye looks upon us, with darkness, at the gates of the underworld)
17. "Pater peccavi" (Father, I have sinned)
18. "Con sublima spiritualità" (With highest spirituality)

=== Orchestration ===
The music requires a very unusual, and possibly symmetrical orchestra:

- 6 flutes (all doubling on piccolos)
- 6 E♭ clarinets (3 doubling on B♭ clarinets)*
- contrabassoon
- 6 horns in F
- 8 trumpets in C
- 6 trombones
- tuba
- a consort of 4 viols
- 8 contrabasses
- electronic tape
- an enormous amount of percussion (including about 100 instruments)
- 3 harps
- 3 pianos, each with two players
- electronic organ

- In an intermediary revision of the work, Orff had all six clarinets in B♭.

The percussion section, requiring about 25 to 30 players, consists of:

- 2 snare drums
- 6 tambourines
- 3 tenor drums
- 2 bass drums (one with attached cymbal)
- 3 darabukka (alto, tenor, and bass)
- 3 tom-toms
- 6 congas
- bass conga
- 4 "timpanetti" with unpitched wooden drum heads (soprano, alto, tenor, and bass)
- 5 timpani (3 with cymbals)
- 5 crotales
- 5 suspended cymbals
- 1 pair of crash cymbals
- 3 copper tam-tams (40–60 centimetres in diameter)
- 2 tam-tams (large & very large)
- gong pitched to low C
- dobaci (a Japanese temple bell) pitched to C♯
- 5 high bronze bells "at the interval of a semitone"
- two sets of tubular bells
- triangle
- guiro
- whip
- maracas
- 6 castanets
- hyoshigi*
- angklung
- 3 wood bells, actually referring to temple blocks
- 5 wood blocks
- "simple" and "double" ratchets
- 3 "large church ratchets"
- 4 water glasses
- celesta
- 2 glockenspiels
- lithophone
- metallophone
- xylophone
- tenor xylophone
- bass xylophone
- 2 marimbas

- The hyoshigi are used only on the inside of the piano at the climax of part 3, where they are struck hard on the piano strings by a percussionist. In the original score, they were used in one other passage as well.

The total forces used for the taped sections are

- piccolo
- 8 flutes
- 10 trumpets in C
- 4 trombones
- 2 pianos
- grand church organ
- glockenspiel
- marimba
- crotales
- timpano, as well as large vocal forces:
- tenor and contralto solos
- a large chorus (emitting a loud scream); a tenor section, and double-chorus of sopranos and altos
- a children's chorus (soprano).

There is also one spoken part, an echo of one of the sibyls' spoken dialogue, accompanied by wind machine.

=== Tape sections ===
The music on the magnetic tape is used in four different places, most notably at the end when Lucifer appears.

The first section is used in part 1, and requires the following instruments:

- piccolo
- glockenspiel
- marimba
- piano

The second section, also used in part 1 utilizes the following:

- wind machine, accompanying an echo of one of the Sibyl's dialogue.

The third section is used in part 2:

- A children's choir and tenor section
- 2 trumpets in C
- crotales
- glockenspiel
- marimba
- timpano
- 2 pianos

The fourth and final section is used towards the end of part 3. In Orff's final revision in 1981, this taped section was omitted and instead given to players in the orchestra:

- 8 flutes
- 10 trumpets in C, intoning a fanfare to heaven
- 4 trombones
- A female chorus (SSAA)
- tenor and contralto soloists
- children's choir

=== 1979 revision ===
Orff later made extensive revisions to De temporum fine comoedia with many changes in orchestration. In his 1981 revision the following instruments were added:

- 1 snare drum, bringing the total number to 3
- 7 water glasses, bringing the total to 11
- grand church organ, in return omitting it on tape

The following instruments were eliminated:

- triangle
- 3 timpanetti, leaving only 1 (alto)
- All 3 copper tam-tams
- 2 church ratchets, leaving only 1
- 2 suspended cymbals, bringing the number down to 3

The modifications to the pre-recorded music consist of the addition of the following:

- 1 piano, bringing the total up to 3
- 3 contrabasses

The omissions consisted of:

- All 8 flutes
- 8 trumpets, leaving only 2
- All 4 trombones
- grand church organ, instead brought into the orchestra
- double-chorus of sopranos and altos, replaced by a small chorus in the orchestra pit
- tenor and alto soloists, whose parts are reduced and sung live

In addition to loud percussive passages, there are also as periods of calm piano and straight dialogue. In this culmination of his stage works, Orff almost abandons his diatonicism to chromaticism, which enriches and thickens the musical texture, and octatonicism.

As the play is about to finish, after the destruction of all worldly material, Satan asks for forgiveness and is restored to Angel Lucifer, thus forgiven. The unsettling chromaticism here ends and Bach's Before Thy Throne (Vor deinen Thron tret ich hiermit, BWV 668) strikes up in a canon from the four viols. This canon is pandiatonic and upon its completion, its mirror image is stated (that is the identical material played backward).

== Bibliography ==
- Alberto Fassone, Carl Orff, Libreria Musicale Italiana, 2. edition, Lucca 2009. ISBN 978-88-7096-580-3.
- Horst Leuchtmann (ed.), Carl Orff. Ein Gedenkbuch, Hans Schneider, Tutzing 1985. ISBN 3-7952-0451-8.
- Carl Orff, Carl Orff und sein Werk. Dokumentation, vol. VIII, Theatrum Mundi, Hans Schneider, Tutzing 1983; ISBN 3-7952-0373-2.
- Thomas Rösch (ed.), Text, Musik, Szene ─ Das Musiktheater von Carl Orff. Symposium Orff-Zentrum München 2007, Schott Verlag, Mainz 2015; ISBN 978-3-7957-0672-2.
- Thomas Rösch, Zur Bedeutung der »hypokryphen Zitate« im letzten Teil »Dies illae« von Carl Orffs »De temporum fine comoedia«, in: Thomas Rösch (ed.), Text, Musik, Szene ─ Das Musiktheater von Carl Orff. Symposium Orff-Zentrum München 2007, Schott Verlag, Mainz 2015, pp. 247–299; ISBN 978-3-7957-0672-2.
- Werner Thomas, Carl Orff, »De temporum fine comoedia«. Das Spiel vom Ende der Zeiten. Vigilia, Hans Schneider, Tutzing 1973, ISBN 3-7952-0132-2.
- Werner Thomas, Das Rad der Fortuna ─ Ausgewählte Aufsätze zu Werk und Wirkung Carl Orffs, Schott Verlag, Mainz 1990, ISBN 3-7957-0209-7.
- Werner Thomas, Dem unbekannten Gott. Ein nicht ausgeführtes Chorwerk von Carl Orff, Schott Verlag, Mainz 1997, ISBN 3-7957-0323-9.
