= Orchestra Filarmonica della Fenice =

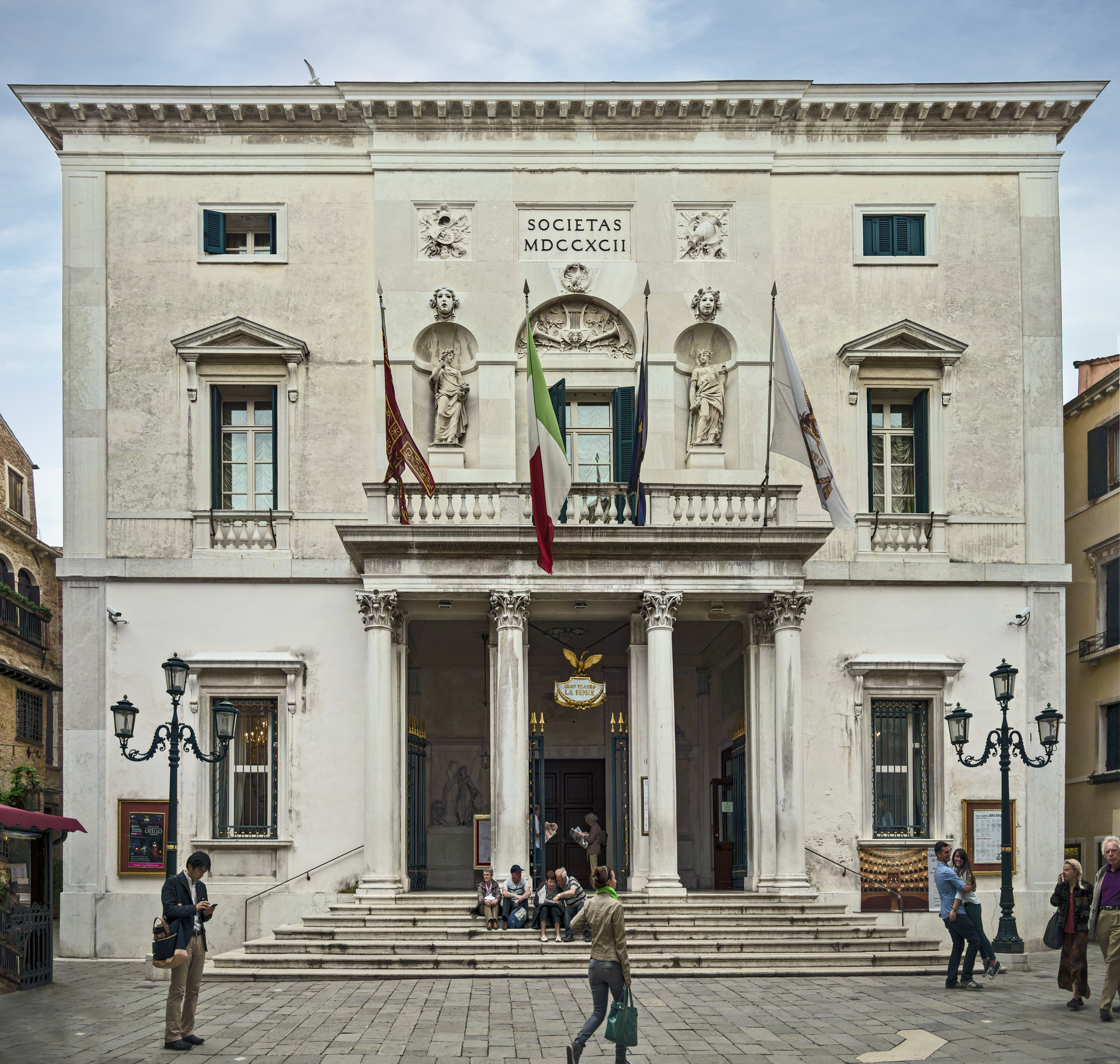
Facade by Giovanni Battista Meduna.

Orchestra Filarmonica della Fenice was founded in 2007. The inaugural concert was held at Gran Teatro La Fenice in Venice, Italy on 10 May 2010 and was directed by Riccardo Chailly.

== History ==
The Association Orchestra Filarmonica del Gran Teatro La Fenice di Venezia performs its activity in concordance with Consiglio di Amministrazione della Fondazione Teatro La Fenice, intending the promotion and diffusion of music, especially the symphonic genre, regionally, nationally and internationally. This is executed with total autonomy, and always in the pursuit of a high artistic-musical prestige.

For that purpose the Orchestra realizes its own seasons of concerts at La Fenice and develops contextually intense relationships with multiple cultural actualities for the promotion of its own activity in Italy and foreign countries, availing of the collaboration of prestigious orchestra leaders and soloists famous all over the world.

Attention is referenced to the new generations, both keeping a tight contact with viewers that are still in school, that is to say the tomorrow's public, and dedicating attention to the professional growth of talented young people that are starting to take their first steps in the difficult world of music.

== President ==
Currently the role of President is being performed by Luciano Guerrato, owner of the namesake society, while the honorary President is Umberto Veronesi.

== Orchestra ==
The basic staff of the Orchestra is composed of about 90 partners, professors with an open-ended contract with the Foundation of Teatro La Fenice; depending on the needs and on the repertories the staff can be extended through outer collaborations of professors of orchestra with proven fame and experience.

== Conductors and soloists ==
Riccardo Chailly, Omer Meir Wellber, Diego Matheuz, Aziz Shokakimov, Susanna Mälkki, John Axelrod, Marcus Stenz, Daniele Rustioni, Kirill Karabits, Enrico Bronzi, Antonello Manacorda, Anna Winniskaia, Nicola Benedetti, Gloria Campaner, Alessio Allegrini, The Swingles Singers, Marcelo Álvarez, Sting.
