= Octophonic sound =

Typical octophonic arrangements
8 speakers spaced on a circle by 45°, first speaker 0°.

8 speakers spaced on a circle by 45°, first speaker 22.5°.

8 speakers spaced on the vertices of a cube.

Octophonic sound is a form of audio reproduction that presents eight discrete audio channels using eight speakers. For playback, the speakers may be positioned in a circle around the listeners or in any other configuration.

Typical speaker configurations are eight spaced on a circle by 45° (oriented with first speaker 0° or at 22.5°), or the vertices of a cube to create a double quadraphonic set-up with elevation. In reference to his own work, Karlheinz Stockhausen made a distinction between these two forms, reserving the term octophonic for a cube configuration, as found in his Oktophonie and the electronic music for scene 2 and the Farewell of Mittwoch aus Licht, and using the expression "eight-channel sound" for the circular arrangement, as used in Sirius, Unsichtbare Chöre, or Hours 13 to 21 of the Klang cycle. While quadraphonic sound uses four speakers positioned in a square at the four corners of the listening space (either on the ground or raised above the listeners), this cubical kind of octophonic spatialization offers both horizontal and vertical sound spatialization, meaning listeners get a sense of height. In order for such movement in space to be heard, it is necessary that rhythms be slow, and pitches change mainly in small steps or in glissandos.

Some notable composers who have worked with octophonic spatialisation include Karlheinz Stockhausen, Jonathan Harvey, Gérard Pape, and Larry Austin. The first known octophonic (that is, eight-channel) electronic music was John Cage's Williams Mix (1951–53) for eight separate simultaneously played back quarter-inch magnetic tapes. Austin later made a surround-sound octophonic mix of Williams Mix, Williams (re)Mix[ed] (1997–2000), using the score and different sound sources. This version is intended to be played back on eight speakers surrounding the audience in a 360° circle, using (unlike Cage's original version) stereo source recordings heard in adjacent speaker pairs. Octophonic sound (in the general sense of eight-channel playback) was stimulated primarily by "the equal coverage it provides to all listening angles" and also by the precedence of eight-channel (initially tape) sound and subsequent ease of playback.

== See also ==
- Height channels
