= Nicolas Becker (jurist) =

German criminal defense lawyer (born 1946)

Nicolas Becker (born 1946) is a German jurist and criminal defense lawyer.

== Career ==
Becker was born in Kressbronn am Bodensee, the second son of the lawyer and educator Hellmut Becker and the writer Antoinette Becker. He grew up at Lake Konstanz, studied law in Freiburg, where he was a leading member of the student movement. His career is marked by many high profile cases. In the 1970s, Becker represented several RAF members at the infamous Stammheim Trials. In the early 1990s, he took over the defense of the former Chairman of the Council of State, Erich Honecker. Among his best-known mandates were Christiane Felscherinow (Zoo Station: The Story of Christiane F.) and, at the end of the 1990s, the impostor Gert Postel. He defended Manfred Krug when he was charged with road rage assault, and also represented the legendary Tunnel Gangsters.

He advised the author Jurek Becker during the creation of a popular TV attorney series Liebling Kreuzberg with Manfred Krug, and has himself ghost written several books.

Becker lives in Berlin and is married to the American-Austrian-Jewish writer Irene Dische. They have two children.
