= Dieter Gutknecht =

Dieter Gutknecht (born in 1942) is a German musicologist and former University music director.

== Life ==
Gutknecht first began his music studies with a focus on performance practice early music, violin and conducting at the State Hochschule für Musik und Tanz Köln. Meanwhile he studied musicology, Germanistik and philosophy in Cologne and Vienna. He passed his state examination in 1968 and his doctorate in 1971. His research topic was Investigations on the melodic theory of the Huguenot Psalter, using the computer. In 1992 Gutknecht habilitated with studies on the history of early music performance practice (1993,1997).

Gutknecht was music director of the University of Cologne. At the same time he taught as a lecturer at the Musicological Institute of the University of Cologne from 1970 until his retirement in 2008.

Gutknecht published numerous articles on Historically informed performance, ornaments as well as personal articles in Die Musik in Geschichte und Gegenwart (MGG), on early music performance practice, on the work of Karlheinz Stockhausen, Morton Feldman, Sofia Gubaidulina, contemporary music and the relationship between music and art/architecture.

He has conducted in France, Holland and Poland, concentrating on the great oratorios of Johann Sebastian Bach and Georg Friedrich Händel.

== Publications ==
- Untersuchungen zur Melodik des Hugenottenpsalters. Bosse: Regensburg. 1972.
- Studien zur Geschichte der Aufführungspraxis Alter Musik. Ein Überblick vom Beginn des 19. Jahrhunderts bis zum Zweiten Weltkrieg. Concerto Verlag: Cologne. 1993.
- Musik als Bild: allegorische 'Verbildlichungen' im 17. Jahrhundert. Rombach: Freiburg im Breisgau. 2003.
- Die Wiederkehr des Vergangenen. on Schott Campus
