= Antoinette Becker =

French-German author (1920–1998)

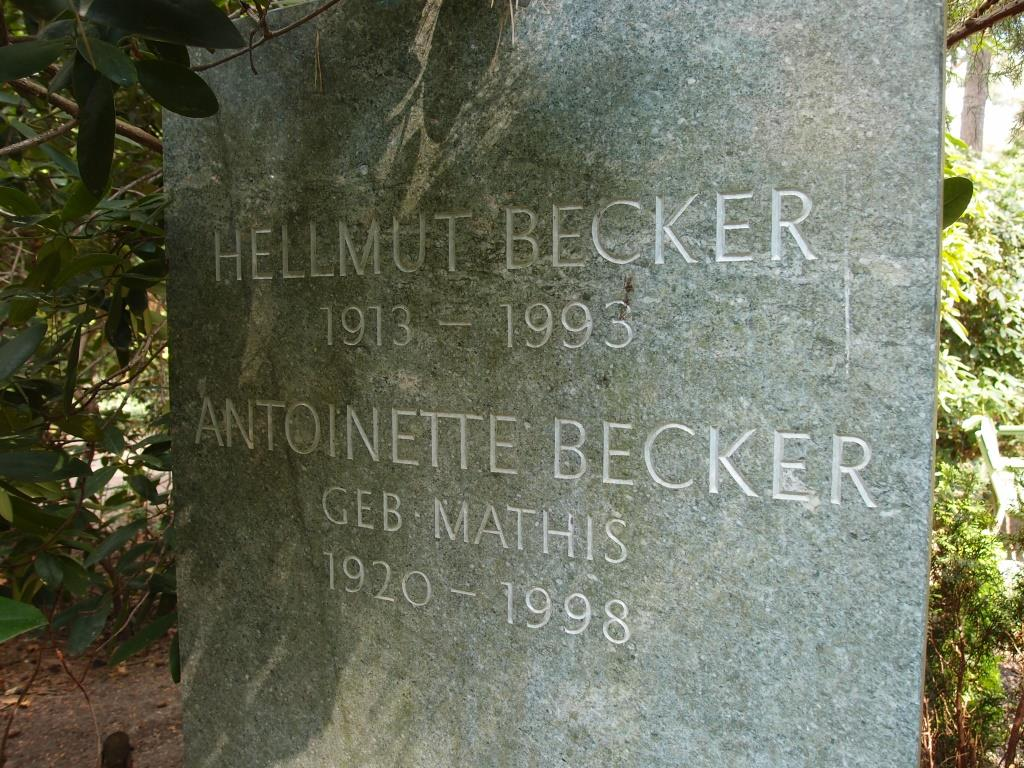
Grave of Antoinette and Hellmut Becker on the Waldfriedhof Dahlem.

Antoinette Becker (born Antoinette Mathis, 5 April 1920 – 29 August 1998) was a French-German author, especially of books for children and young people. She also translated, such as Aribert Reimann's opera Lear.

== Career ==
Born Antoinette Mathis in Strasbourg, she was the secretary of Ernst Rudolf Huber, professor of constitutional law at the Reichsuniversität Straßburg. She met there her future husband Hellmut Becker who worked as an assistant, and later became a lawyer and politician of education. The couple raised six children, including the lawyer Nicolas Becker, the psychoanalyst Stephan Becker, Sophinette Becker, and also the foster child Joachim Nettelbeck.

Becker translated, including Aribert Reimann's opera Lear for the premiere in France in November 1982 at the Paris Opera. She died in Berlin.

== Works ==
- Meine Religion, deine Religion. Maier, Ravensburg 1983, ISBN 3-473-33412-X.
- Meine Familie, deine Familie. Maier, Ravensburg 1977, ISBN 3-473-33415-4.
- Jede Familie ist anders. Maier, Ravensburg 1977, ISBN 3-473-55015-9.
- Ich gehe zum Zahnarzt. Maier, Ravensburg 1976, ISBN 3-473-33409-X.
- with Elizabeth Conolly-Smith: du, ich, wir. Maier, Ravensburg 1975, ISBN 3-473-55001-9.
- Ich kann bald schwimmen. Maier, Ravensburg 1975, ISBN 3-473-33407-3.
- Ich bin doch auch wie ihr. Maier, Ravensburg 1975, ISBN 3-473-33408-1.
- Ich habe eine Mark. Maier, Ravensburg 1974, ISBN 3-473-33406-5.
- Ich mag Musik. Maier, Ravensburg 1974, ISBN 3-473-33405-7.
- Ich sorge für ein Tier. Maier, Ravensburg 1973, ISBN 3-473-33404-9.
- Ich bekomme einen Bruder. Maier, Ravensburg 1973, ISBN 3-473-33403-0.
- Ich bin jetzt in der Schule. Maier, Ravensburg 1972, ISBN 3-473-33401-4.
- Ich bin jetzt im Krankenhaus Maier, Ravensburg 1972, ISBN 3-473-33402-2.
- Kinder fragen nach Gott. Matthias-Grünewald-Verlag, Mainz 1962.

== Literature ==
- Ulrich Raulff: Kreis ohne Meister. München 2009, ISBN 978-3-406-59225-6.
