= Nicholas Isherwood =

American opera singer

- Genres: Baroque
- Occupations: Musician, teacher
- Instrument: Singer
- Website: nicholasisherwood.com

Nicholas Isherwood is a Franco-American bass singer, who specialises in contemporary and baroque music. Notable roles include "Lucifer" in the world premieres of Stockhausen’s Montag, Dienstag, and Freitag from Licht at La Scala and the Leipzig Opera, and in Donnerstag aus Licht at Covent Garden.

== Life and career ==
Isherwood has worked with Joel Cohen, William Christie, Peter Eötvös, Paul McCreesh, Nicholas McGegan, Kent Nagano, Zubin Mehta and Gennady Rozhdestvensky as well as composers Sylvano Bussotti, Elliott Carter, George Crumb, Hans Werner Henze, Elliott Sharp, Mauricio Kagel, György Kurtág, Olivier Messiaen, Giacinto Scelsi, Karlheinz Stockhausen, and Iannis Xenakis in venues such as La Scala, Covent Garden, the Théâtre des Champs-Élysées, Salzburg Festival, Concertgebouw, Berlin Staatsoper, Vienna Konzerthaus, Tanglewood).

Beside the Stockhausen works mentioned above, his other operatic roles include: "Antinoo" in Monteverdi’s Il ritorno d'Ulisse in Patria with Boston Baroque; "Claudio" in Handel’s Agrippina with Nicholas McGegan; "Satiro" in Rossi’s Orfeo and "Pan" in Marais’ Alcyone with Les Arts Florissants; "Joas" in Porpora's Il Gedeone with Martin Haselböck; "Frère Léon" in Messiaen's Saint François d’Assise in the last composer supervised production; "Der Tod" in the two productions of Viktor Ullmann’s Der Kaiser von Atlantis with the Internationale Bachakademie Stuttgart and 2e2m, "Roméo" in Black Madea Dusapin’s Roméo et Juliette at the Avignon Festival; "Lear" in Toshio Hosokawa’s Vision of Lear for the Munich Biennale; for composer Elliott Sharp, the role of Walter Benjamin in the opera Port Bou at Konzerthaus Berlin, as well as Beethoven in Die Grösste Fuge for the "Beethoven@250" festival in Bonn; "Il Testimone" in Sylvano Bussotti’s Tieste at the Rome Opera, and "Micromégas" in Paul Mefano's Micromégas. Recent performances include the role of the doctor in Francesco Filidei's " L'Inondation" at the Opéra de Rennes and the Opéra de Nantes (fall, 2019).

In addition to singing, Isherwood has had an extremely active pedagogical career. He has been engaged as professor (or assistant professor) of vocal music and/or music theater (opera) at institutions in France, Germany, and the United States, including the IRCAM Summer Academy, Stockhausen-Kurse (Kürten, Germany), State University of New York, University of Notre Dame, Ecole Normale de Musique (Paris), California Institute of the Arts, and the University of Oregon (2008–2011). From 2015 to 2018, he was a professor of voice at the CNSMD de Lyon, and he has been professor of voice at the Conservatoire de Montbéliard since 2019.

He has presented masterclasses, workshops, and lectures at the Salzburg Mozarteum; Iannis Xenakis Summer Courses (Paris); Conservatoire de Reims; Paris Conservatoire (CNSMP), California State University, Los Angeles; Stanford University; University of California, Berkeley; University of California, Santa Barbara; University of Washington; San Francisco State University; California Institute of the Arts; ARIAM (Paris); Conservatorio Giuseppe Verdi (Milan); Institute of the Living Voice (Berlin); Troyes Conservatoire; Mexico City University; Normal University of Taiwan; at CCMIX (Paris); IRCAM (Paris); USC; Cal State LA; Cal State Riverside; Cal State Fullerton; Harvard University.

Among his publications, The Techniques of Singing describes the techniques needed to perform contemporary vocal music.

== Discography ==
With Steve Lacy

- Clangs (hat ART, 1993)
- Voxnova (Valérie Chouanière, soprano; Isabelle Soccoja, mezzo-soprano; Thierry Fouré, tenor; Nicholas Isherwood, bass-baritone). In the Sky I Am Walking: Songs of the Native Americans. CD sound disc. Mode 68. New York: Mode Records, 1998. Nine pieces of Native-American music, plus Karlheinz Stockhausen's Indianerlieder, and Pascal Dusapin's Red Rock and "Après" from the opera Roméo et Juliette.
- Karlheinz Stockhausen: Capricorn, for bass voice and electronic music. Nicholas Isherwood, bass. Stockhausen Complete Edition CD 59 (with Rechter Augenbrauentanz for clarinets, bass clarinets, percussionist, synthesizer player).
- Karlheinz Stockhausen: Havona, für Bass und elektronische Musik: 14. Stunde aus Klang (and electronic music alone, for rehearsals). Nicholas Isherwood, bass. Stockhausen Complete Edition CD 92. Kürten: Stockhausen-Verlag, 2009.
