= 1965 in France =

- Decades: 1940s; 1950s; 1960s; 1970s; 1980s
- See also: History of France; Timeline of French history; List of years in France

Events from the year 1965 in France.

== Incumbents ==
- President: Charles de Gaulle
- Prime Minister: Georges Pompidou

== Events ==
- 5 January – Launch of the Renault 16, the world's first production hatchback car.
- 14 March – Municipal elections held.
- 21 March – Municipal elections held.
- 16 July – The Mont Blanc Tunnel is inaugurated by presidents Giuseppe Saragat and Charles de Gaulle.
- 22 October – Authors André Figueras and Jacques Laurent are fined for their comments against Charles De Gaulle.
- 28 October – Foreign Minister Couve de Murville travels to Moscow.
- 29 October – Mehdi Ben Barka, a Moroccan politician, is kidnapped in Paris and never seen again.
- 3 November – President Charles de Gaulle announces that he will stand for re-election.
- 21 November – Mireille Mathieu sings on France's "Télé-Dimanche" and begins her successful singing career.
- 26 November – At the Hammaguir, a launch facility in the Sahara Desert, France launches a Diamant-A rocket with its first satellite, Asterix-1 on board, becoming the third country to enter space.
- 5 December – Charles de Gaulle is re-elected as French president.

== Sport ==
- 22 June – Tour de France begins.
- 14 July – Tour de France ends, won by Felice Gimondi of Italy.

== Births ==
=== January to March ===
- 4 January – Yvan Attal, actor and director
- 8 January – Pascal Obispo, singer-songwriter
- 11 January – Bertrand de Billy, conductor
- 15 January – Jean-Yves Béziau, philosopher
- 25 January – Pascal Lefèvre, javelin thrower
- 23 February – Sylvie Guillem, ballet dancer
- 28 February – Philippe Gaillot, soccer player
- 9 March – Benoît Campargue, judoka
- 15 March – Pascal Tayot, judoka
- 21 March – Xavier Bertrand, politician and Minister
- 31 March – Jean-Christophe Lafaille, mountaineer (died 2006)

=== April to June ===
- 19 April – Natalie Dessay, soprano
- 23 April – René Piller, racewalker
- 27 April – Patrick Rémy, cross-country skier
- 14 May – Zahia Hamdane, politician
- 20 May – Bruno Marie-Rose, athlete and Olympic medallist
- 20 May – Jean-Charles Trouabal, athlete
- 26 May – Christophe Kalfayan, swimmer
- 5 June – Sandrine Piau, soprano
- 7 June – Jean-Pierre François, French footballer and singer
- 12 June – Florence Guérin, actress
- 17 June – Pascal Despeyroux, soccer player
- 21 June – François Baroin, politician
- 23 June – Stéphane de Gérando, composer, conductor, multimedia artist and researcher
- 27 June – Stéphane Paille, soccer player (died 2017)
- 29 June – Véronique Laury, businesswoman

=== July to September ===
- 2 July – Luc Borrelli, soccer player (died 1999)
- 3 July – Bertrand Layec, soccer referee
- 16 July – Michel Desjoyeaux, sailor
- 20 July – Laurent Lucas, actor
- 21 July – Sylvie Giry Rousset, cross-country skier
- 24 July – Olivier Py, stage director, actor and writer
- 25 July – Laurent Lucas, actor
- 5 August – Jean-Marc Morandini, journalist
- 6 August – Luc Alphand, alpine skier, motor racing driver
- 7 August – Jocelyn Angloma, international soccer player
- 13 August – Éric Durand, soccer player
- 14 August – Emmanuelle Béart, actress
- 16 August – Stéphane Picq, composer of computer game music
- 1 September – Jean-François Ballester, figure skating coach (d. 2018)
- 10 September – Pierre Camara, triple jumper
- 10 September – Pascal Pinard, swimmer and multiple Paralympic gold medallist
- 11 September – Jean-Philippe Fleurian, tennis player
- 17 September – Franck Piccard, Alpine skier and Olympic gold medallist
- 19 September – Gilles Panizzi, rally driver
- 19 September – Sabine Paturel, singer and actress
- 21 September – Frédéric Beigbeder, writer, commentator, literary critic and pundit
- 24 September – Fabrice Philipot, cyclist (died 2020)

=== October to December ===
- 1 October – Jean-Philippe Ruggia, motorcycle racer
- 10 October – Éric Blanc, impersonator and comedian
- 20 October – Jil Caplan, singer and songwriter
- 25 October – Mathieu Amalric, actor and film director
- 28 October – Franck Sauzée, soccer player
- 1 November – Christophe Clement, horse trainer
- 2 November – Samuel Le Bihan, actor
- 3 November – Ann Scott, novelist
- 14 November – Ariel Besse, actress
- 19 November – Laurent Blanc, international soccer player
- 22 November – Vincent Guérin, soccer player, coach

=== Full date unknown ===
- Nicolas Bourriaud, curator and art critic
- Sylvain Luc, jazz guitarist

== Deaths ==
=== January to March ===
- 17 January – Pierre-Marie Gerlier, Cardinal (born 1880)
- 21 January – André Godard, archeologist and architect (born 1881)
- 28 January – Maxime Weygand, military commander (born 1867)
- 14 February – Désiré-Émile Inghelbrecht, composer and conductor (born 1880)
- 20 February
  - Théophile Marie Brébant, military officer (born 1889)
  - René Jeannel, entomologist (born 1879)
- March Claude-Léon Mascaux, sculptor (born 1882)
- 6 March – Jules Goux, motor racing driver (born 1885)
- 10 March – Jean Boyer, film director and author (born 1901)
- 20 March – Louis de Fleurac, athlete and Olympic medallist (born 1876)
- 22 March – Pierre Courant, politician (born 1897)

=== April to June ===
- 1 April – Daniel Barbier, astronomer (born 1907)
- 20 April – Arsène Alancourt, cyclist (born 1904)
- 23 April – Georges Périnal, cinematographer (born 1897)
- 24 April – Pierre Wertheimer, businessman and racehorse owner (born 1888)
- 12 May – Roger Vailland, novelist, essayist, and screenwriter (born 1907)
- 20 May – Charles Camoin, painter (born 1879)
- 15 June – Maurice Monney-Bouton, rower and Olympic medallist (born 1892)
- 25 June – Jacques Bacot, explorer and Tibetologist (born 1877)
- 26 June – Maurice Brocco, cyclist (born 1885)

=== July to September ===
- 9 July – Jacques Audiberti, playwright, poet and novelist (born 1899)
- 17 July – Eugène Bigot, composer and conductor (born 1888)
- 27 July – Henri Daniel-Rops, writer and historian (born 1901)
- 7 August – Jean Dargassies, racing cyclist (born 1872)
- 19 August – René Lasserre, rugby union player (born 1895)
- 31 August – Henri Mignet, aircraft designer and builder (born 1893)
- 2 September – Émile Muselier, Admiral (born 1882)
- 15 September – Noël Delberghe, water polo player and Olympic medallist (born 1897)
- 23 September – Lionel Terray, climber (born 1921)

=== October to December ===
- November – Marguerite Jeanne Carpentier, painter and sculptor (born 1886)
- 6 November – Edgard Varèse, composer (born 1883)
- 18 November – Jean Médecin, lawyer and politician (born 1890)

=== Full date unknown ===
- Albert Besson, hygienist and physician (born 1896)
- Donatien Bouché, sailor and Olympic gold medallist (born 1882)
- Marcel Boucher, jewellery designer (born 1898)
- Aimée Antoinette Camus, botanist (born 1897)
- Jean Favard, mathematician (born 1902)
- Colette Reynaud, journalist (born 1872)

== See also ==
- List of French films of 1965
