= Mihi Kim =

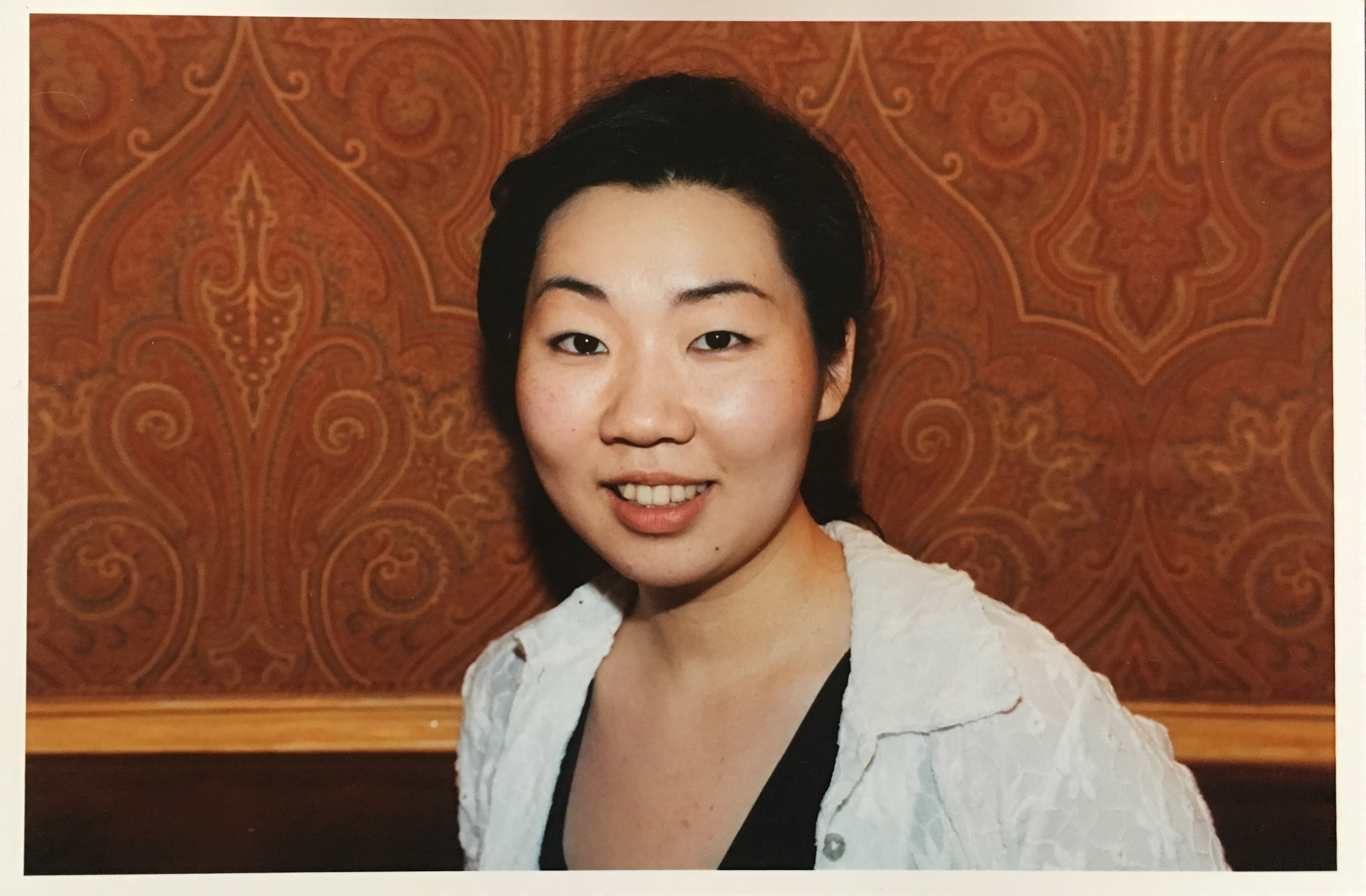

Korean name
- Hangul: 김미희
- Hanja: 金美禧
- RR: Gim Mihui
- MR: Kim Mihŭi

Mihi Kim is a French flautist originally from Korea, living in Paris, France.

== Musical style ==
Her playing in distinguished by various styles, including contemporary repertoire as well as classical work for flute. She also plays the piccolo.

== Early life and studies ==
She was born in Seoul, Korea, but moved at her early age to Germany. She lived and studied in Germany and France, where she graduated from Hochschule für Musik und Tanz Köln, Hochschule für Musik und Theater München, and Conservatoire de Paris. She studied with Ida Ribéra, Alain Marion, Jean-Pierre Rampal, András Adorján, Paul Meisen, Aurèle Nicolet and Pierre-Yves Artaud.

== Career ==
She is the first non-European having obtained the French national teaching diploma Certificat d'aptitude (CA) (2001). She teaches at the École Normale de Musique de Paris since 1998, and at the Issy-les-Moulineaux Conservatory of music (CRD) near Paris. She is a Miyazawa Flutes international artist, and plays a Boston Classic #80222 made of platinum 900/000.

== Awards ==
In 1998 she became a laureate of the 5th International Flute Competition in Paris, "Jean-Pierre-Rampal". In 2000 she won the Grand Prix of the Pacem in Terris Bayreuth International Music Competition.

== Discography ==
- Henri-Jean Schubnel (CD H.J.S. A 1998): Work of Henri-Jean Schubnel
- Autoportraits (Mandala MAN 5084): Work of Régis Campo
- Pop-Art (1 CD aeon AECD 0529): Work of Régis Campo
- Frida Kern (Harp & co CD 5050-08): Work of Frida Kern
- Hommage à Debussy (Harp & co CD 5050-10): Works of Mel Bonis - Oedeon Partos - Henri Lazarof - Claude Debussy
- Le cavalier bleu (Anima ANM/130700001): Works of Walter Gieseking - Gabriel Pierné - Darius Milhaud - Otar Taktakishvili - Mihi Kim, flute - Bertrand Giraud, piano
- Laterna Magica (MusiCube CUB1302): Work of Régis Campo : Le pic-vert (2000, remixed version 2012)

== Cosmopolitan life ==
Born in Korea, raised in Germany and France, she is quadrilingual with Korean, German, French and English, and speaks fluently several more (Spanish, Japanese, Italian, Chinese)
