= Gérando =

Gérando is a surname. Notable people with the surname include:

- Antonine de Gérando (1844-1914), French-born Hungarian translator and educator
- Joseph Marie, baron de Gérando, French writer
- Stéphane de Gérando, French composer
