= Paul Méfano =

French composer and conductor (1937–2020)

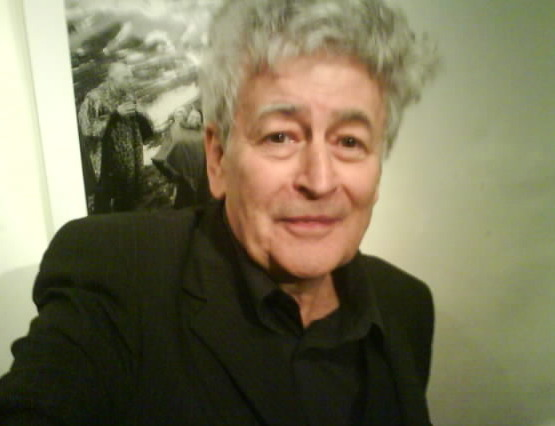
- Paul Méfano, November 2009
- Born: 6 March 1937; Basra, Iraq
- Died: 15 September 2020 (aged 83)
- Education: École Normale de Musique de Paris; Paris Conservatory
- Occupations: Composer; Conductor
- Era: Contemporary
- Awards: Ordre du Mérite; Ordre des Arts et des Lettres

Paul Méfano (6 March 1937 – 15 September 2020) was a French composer and conductor.

== Biography ==
Paul Méfano was born in Basra, Iraq. He pursued musical studies at the École Normale de Musique de Paris, and then later at the Paris Conservatory (CNSMP), where he was a student of Andrée Vaurabourg-Honegger, Darius Milhaud, and Georges Dandelot. He completed his studies in Basel at the courses taught by Pierre Boulez, Karlheinz Stockhausen, and Henri Pousseur.

He regularly attended the concerts of the Domaine Musical, as well as the seminars at the Darmstädter Ferienkurse, and enrolled in Olivier Messiaen's class at the CNSMP. Messiaen described Méfano as "restless, intense, and always in search of radical solutions".

In 1965 his music was performed publicly for the first time, at the Domaine Musical under the baton of Bruno Maderna. From 1966 to 1968 he lived in the United States, and then in 1969 he moved to Berlin at the invitation of the German Academic Exchange Service (DAAD).

In 1970 he returned to France, signed a contract with Salabert, and devoted himself to composition, to conducting, and to musical life in general. In 1972 he founded the Ensemble 2e2m, a group which he regularly conducted, and with which he has premièred more than five hundred works by young composers and with which he has made more than forty recordings. Amongst those younger composers are Stéphane de Gérando, Laurent Mettraux, Thierry Blondeau, Marc André, Michael Finnissy, James Dillon, Bruce Mather, and Claude Lefebvre, but he has also championed older composers such as Jean Barraqué, Brian Ferneyhough, Franco Donatoni, Luigi Nono, Aldo Clementi, Philippe Boesmans, Morton Feldman, Edison Denisov, and John Cage, as well as participating in the rediscovery of Charles-Valentin Alkan and the Czech composers who were interred at Terezienstadt in 1940. He is the founder of the Editions du Mordant for the publication of contemporary music, and of the Editions Musicales Européennes (dedicated primarily to young composers), and he has produced a number of notable radio series.

In 1972 he was appointed director of the Conservatory of Champigny-sur-Marne, a duty which he performed until 1988. He also was professor of composition and orchestration at the Paris Conservatory until 2002. One of his conducting students was the Canadian composer Claude Vivier.

From 1996 until 2005 he directed the Conservatory of Versailles.

The most important works of Paul Méfano are published and accessible at Babelscores.

In 2007, Paul Méfano became the director of the CLSI ensemble (Circle for the Liberation of Sounds & Images) with various musicians and composers like Gérard Pape, Jacqueline Méfano, Olga Krashenko, Lissa Meridan, Michael Kinney, Martin Phelps, Rodolphe Bourotte, Stefan Tiedje, Jean-Baptiste Favory.

Méfano died on 15 September 2020, at the age of 83.

== Musical style ==
Méfano's compositional style has evolved considerably from his early serial work Incidences (1960) down to recent compositions which make extensive use of microtones, such as Speed (2000). His early serial style is clearly under the influence of Boulez, but the ardour of his employment of these traits "confounds the crystalline, the mirror-like and with it all suggestion of musical geometry". He has an essentially poetic conception of music, reflected in a lifelong interest in poets and poetry. This is manifested especially in his treatment of instrumental color and in his vocal writing. He also has a special feeling for drama, as manifested in La cérémonie. At the beginning of the 1970s he experimented with electronics (La messe des voleurs), and with its real-time combination with instruments. Though he has shown interest in the music of the spectralist composers, his own compositions are not at all similar, and today he is regarded as a "post-spectralist" composer. Many of his works explore and develop contemporary techniques for the flute, such as in Captive, Eventails, Gradiva, Traits suspendus, or Ensevelie. His earliest works (Trois chants crépusculaires) maintain links with tonality, to which he returned in Micromégas. Since this work he has remained faithful to serial technique.

== Awards ==
He has been awarded the following prizes and honors:

- 1971 – Prix Enesco de SACEM.
- 1980 – Chevalier de l'Ordre du Mérite.
- 1982 – Grand prix national de la Musique.
- 1985 – Commandeur de l'Ordre des Arts et Lettres.
- 1989 – Prix SACEM de la musique symphonique.

== Catalog of works ==
Catalog of works
Year	Title	Type of work	Duration
1956	Evocations à l'usage des jeunes filles, for piano	solo (piano)	03:00
1957	Croquis pour un adolescent. 6 pieces for piano	solo (piano)	00:15
1958	Involutive, for clarinet	solo (clarinet)	06:00
1958	Trois Chants crépusculaires (Text by Paul Méfano) [I. Rivages: jamais entamés par le jeu – II. Toi, qui rêveur observe les flammes – III. Perçois-tu, humain le futur], for dramatic soprano and piano	vocal (with piano)	15:00
1959	Estampes japonaises, for soprano and 10 instruments [I. Sur les vagues (Hitomaro, 681–729) – II. La Vague (Ninamato No Sanetamo) – III. Pluie (anonymous, 8th century) – IV. Dans la bise glacée (Ki No Tsurayuki, 883–946) – V. Dans un jardin (anonymous 12th century poet). There are 3 versions: a) light or coloratura soprano and ensemble – b) light or coloratura soprano and piano reduction – c) Transcription for flute (pic, bass fl) and piano	vocal	10:00
1959	Danse bulgare n° 1, after Bartók version 1 (1959) – version 2 (1980): for string orchestra	orchestral music	01:50
1959	Variations libres, after Bartók (version 1 (1959) – version 2 (1980) : for orchestre à cordes	orchestra	01:40
1960	Incidences, for piano and orchestra	orchestra	–
1959	Orchestration of Die jagd, excerpt from Romances without Words by Mendelssohn (revision for orchestra)	orchestra	05:00
1962	Captive (cadence extracted from Madrigal), for flute	solo (flute)	05:00
1962	Lignes, noble bass and 15 instruments	vocal (with instruments)	15:00
1962	Madrigal (Text after Paul Eluard), for 3 female voices or 2 female voices and countertenor, with small instrumental ensemble: fl, pno, hp, & 4perc	vocal (with instruments)	18:00
1962	Que l'oiseau se déchire (poem by Yves Bonnefoy), for voice, clarinet in A and 1 percussionist	vocal (with instruments)	
1962	Mélodies, for soprano, mezzo-soprano or countertenor or contralto, and various instrumental ensembles [1. Nous avons erré longtemps (Omar Kayam), for voice and clarinet in A – 2. La Vague (Ninamato No Sanetamo), for voice and piano – 3. Que l'oiseau se déchire (Yves Bonnefoy), for voice, clarinet in A, and percussion – 4. Et l'unique cordeau (Guillaume Apollinaire), for voice, cl in A, trb, perc, pno, cb – 5. L'Infirmité du feu (Yves Bonnefoy), for voice and 10 instruments	vocal (with instruments)	20:00
1964–65	Paraboles, soprano and ensemble (Version A (movements 1 to 3), for dramatic soprano and ensemble – Version B (movements 1 to 4, symphony orchestra)	vocal & instrumental	–
1966	Interférences, for piano and horn soli and 10 instruments	vocal (with instruments)	12:00
1970	La Cérémonie, oratorio (text by the composer), for soprano, countertenor, baritone, speaking choir and 3 orchestral groups	oratorio	25:00
1970	Old Œdip, "plaisanterie sonore" for reciter, actor, tape, electronics, and ring modulator	vocal	13:30
1970	Intersections, electronic music	electronic	10:10
1972	As you like it? Aleatoric piece for small variable ensemble	instrumental	10–20:00
1972	L'Age de la vie (poem by Paul Eluard), for soprano, horn, and harp	vocal (with instruments)	06:00
1972	La Messe des voleurs, for vocal quartet, chamber ensemble, electronics, and magnetic tape	vocal (with instruments)	75:00
1972	Signes/oubli, for 22 instruments divided into 2 groupes	vocal	07:00
1972	N, for one flutist playing piccolo, flute, alto flute, and bass flute, with electronics, modulator, and magnetic tape	solo (flute)	23:00
1974	They (text: phonemes), for one singer	vocal (a cappella)	03:00
1975	Ondes (espaces mouvants), for 10 instruments	chamber music	08:00
1976	Placebo Domino in regione vivorum, motet for 6 mixed voices (S, MzS, A, T, Bar, B) on a text by the composer	vocal	12:00
1976	Eventails, for amplified bass flute	solo (flute)	10:00
1976	Mouvement calme, for string quartet or string ensemble (12 strings)	chamber music	07:20
1978	Gradiva, for contrabass flute	solo (flute)	24:00
1978	Périple, for saxophone and electronics	solo (saxophone)	06–10:00
1979	Micromégas I, "action musicale" (after Voltaire) [rev. 1983–87 as Micromégas]	opera	
1980	Traits suspendus, contrabass flute or bass flute	solo (flute)	06:00
1980	A Bruno Maderna, for solo cello, 11 strings, and magnetic tape	chamber music	20:00
1983–87	Micromégas, "action lyrique" in 7 tableaux (after Voltaire)	opera	80:00
1984	Scène 3, extract from the opera Micromégas (government commission, 1983) (Grand-théâtre, Metz)	opera	15:00
1984	Douce saveur (poem by Nathalie Méfano), for bass, cor anglais, and tuba	vocal (with instruments)	05:00
1986	Tige, for saxophone	solo (saxophone)	04:00
1986	Ensevelie, for flute and synthesizer-controlled sampler	solo (flute)	10:00
1989	Voyager, interlude for the opera Micromégas, for instrumental ensemble (17 instruments)	chamber music	15:00
1990	Scintillante, for basson and electronics (MIDI-keyboard)	chamber music	07:00
1990	Orchestration of Erwartung, orchestration by Paul Méfano and Michel Decoust, for soprano and 15 instruments	orchestra	30:00
1991	Mémoire de la Porte Blanche, for piano	solo (piano)	06:00
1992	Asahi, for oboe and electronics	solo (oboe)	06:00
1992	Matrice des vents, for sho and electronics	solo (sho)	35:00
1993	Dragonbass, for bass, 2 saxophones, synthesizer and tape	vocal (with instruments)	15:00
1995–96	Mon ami Emile, une interprétation des Valses de Waldteufel [1er cahier: Amour et printemps – Les patineurs – Violettes], for flute, clarinet, piano, and string quartet	chamber music	25:00
1995	Deux mélodies, for sop., mezzo-sop., sax., bass cl., viola	vocal (with instruments)	08:00
1997	Trois chants 1958, for sop., 3 sax., 3 perc., and 3 cellos	vocal (with instruments)	10:00
1998	Cinq pièces for 2 violins	chamber music	12:00
1998	Mon ami Emile, une interprétation des Valses de Waldteufel [2nd collection: Roses et Marguerites – Valse de la poupée – Sirènes – Madeleine], for fl., cl., piano, harmonium, and string quartet	chamber music	35:00
1998	Hélios, for alto flute and string trio	chamber music	20:00
1999	Alone, for violon	solo (violin)	12:00
2001	Tronoën, for cello alone	solo (violoncello)	12:00
2003	Jades, for flute, clarinet, guitar and 2 cellos	chamber music	10:00
(n.d.)	Etrange/arrêtée/seule froissée, for 2 fl., vl., vlc., & perc.	chamber music	09:00
(n.d.)	...s'égrainent comme le vent, for voice, 2 fl., vl., vlc., & perc. (text by Paul Méfano)	vocal (with instruments)	09:00
(n.d.)	Périple à 2, for 2 saxophones	chamber music	05:00
(n.d.)	Périple à 4 for 4 saxophones	chamber music	06:00
(n.d.)	Chanson pour les petits de 6 à 9 ans	vocal	03:00
(n.d.)	Batro, for violin and cello	chamber music	08:00
(n.d.)	Petit Batro for violin and cello	chamber music	16:00

== Discography ==
Discography
Work	Interpretation	Catalog number
Ondes (espaces mouvants)	Paul MÉFANO vol. 1 (oeuvres 1974–1989)	2e2m collection 1006
Placebo Domino in regione vivorum	Paul MÉFANO vol. 1 (oeuvres 1974–1989)	2e2m collection 1006
Mouvement calme	Paul MÉFANO vol. 1 (oeuvres 1974–1989)	2e2m collection 1006
A Bruno Maderna	Paul MÉFANO vol. 1 (oeuvres 1974–1989)	2e2m collection 1006
Ensevelie	Paul MÉFANO vol. 1 (oeuvres 1974–1989)	2e2m collection 1006
Voyager	Paul MÉFANO vol. 1 (oeuvres 1974–1989)	2e2m collection 1006
Involutive	Paul MÉFANO vol. 2 (oeuvres 1958–1972)	2e2m collection 1007
Estampes japonaises	Paul MÉFANO vol. 2 (oeuvres 1958–1972)	2e2m collection 1007
Paraboles	Paul MÉFANO vol. 2 (oeuvres 1958–1972)	2e2m collection 1007
Interférences	Paul MÉFANO vol. 2 (oeuvres 1958–1972)	2e2m collection 1007
Lignes	Paul MÉFANO vol. 2 (oeuvres 1958–1972)	2e2m collection 1007
Signes/oubli	Paul MÉFANO vol. 2 (oeuvres 1958–1972)	2e2m collection 1007
Scintillante	Paul MÉFANO vol. 3 (oeuvres 1978–1993)	2e2m collection 1012
Asahi	Paul MÉFANO vol. 3 (oeuvres 1978–1993)	2e2m collection 1012
Mémoire de la Porte Blanche	Paul MÉFANO vol. 3 (oeuvres 1978–1993)	2e2m collection 1012
Dragonbass	Paul MÉFANO vol. 3 (oeuvres 1978–1993)	2e2m collection 1012
La Matrice des Vents	Paul MÉFANO vol. 3 (oeuvres 1978–1993)	2e2m collection 1012
Périple à deux	Paul MÉFANO vol. 3 (oeuvres 1978–1993)	2e2m collection 1012
Madrigal	M. Mesplé et I. Jarsky (soprano), A. Bartelloni (mezzo), Ensemble 2e2m (Paul Méfano) (Prix Charles Cros)	CBS 76783
Eventails	J. Letroquer (bass flute) (Prix Charles Cros)	CBS 76783
Ondes (Espaces mouvants)	Ensemble 2e2m (Paul Méfano) (Prix Charles Cros)	CBS 76783
Gradiva	Pierre-Yves Artaud (flutes)	Chant du Monde 480 LDX 78700
Traits suspendus	Pierre-Yves Artaud (flutes)	Chant du Monde 480 LDX 78700
They	Vincent	Munro CBS
Périple	Daniel Kientzy (saxophones)	K7 Salabert SC003
Périple	Daniel Kientzy (saxophones)	PAR5303
Captive	Pierre-Yves Artaud (flute)	STIL 0203 S84
Cinq estampes japonaises	Pierre-Yves Artaud (flute), Jacqueline Méfano (piano)	STIL 0203 S84
Eventails	Pierre-Yves Artaud (flute), Zanesi (electronics)	STIL 0203 S84
N	Pierre-Yves Artaud (flute), Zanesi (electronics)	STIL 0203 S84
Mélodies	Dorothy Dorow (S), Ensemble 2e2m, Paul Méfano (dir)	Chant du Monde 480 LDX 78686
