= Madeleine Carpentier =

French painter

- Madeleine Carpentier - selfportrait
- Born: 3 February 1865
- Died: 13 September 1949 (aged 84)
- Known for: Painting

Madeleine Carpentier (3 February 1865 – 13 September 1949) was a French painter.

She was born in Paris and became a pupil of Adrien Bonnefoy and later studied under Jules Lefebvre at the Académie Julian. She showed works at the Paris Salon from 1885 and her work Les Chandelles was purchased by the city of Paris in 1896. A portrait she painted of her sister is in the collection of Musée des Beaux-arts de Nantes.

Her painting Les Chandelles was included in the 1905 book Women Painters of the World. Her daughter Marguerite Jeanne Carpentier, a sculptor, made a sculpture of her for the family grave in Père-Lachaise cemetery.

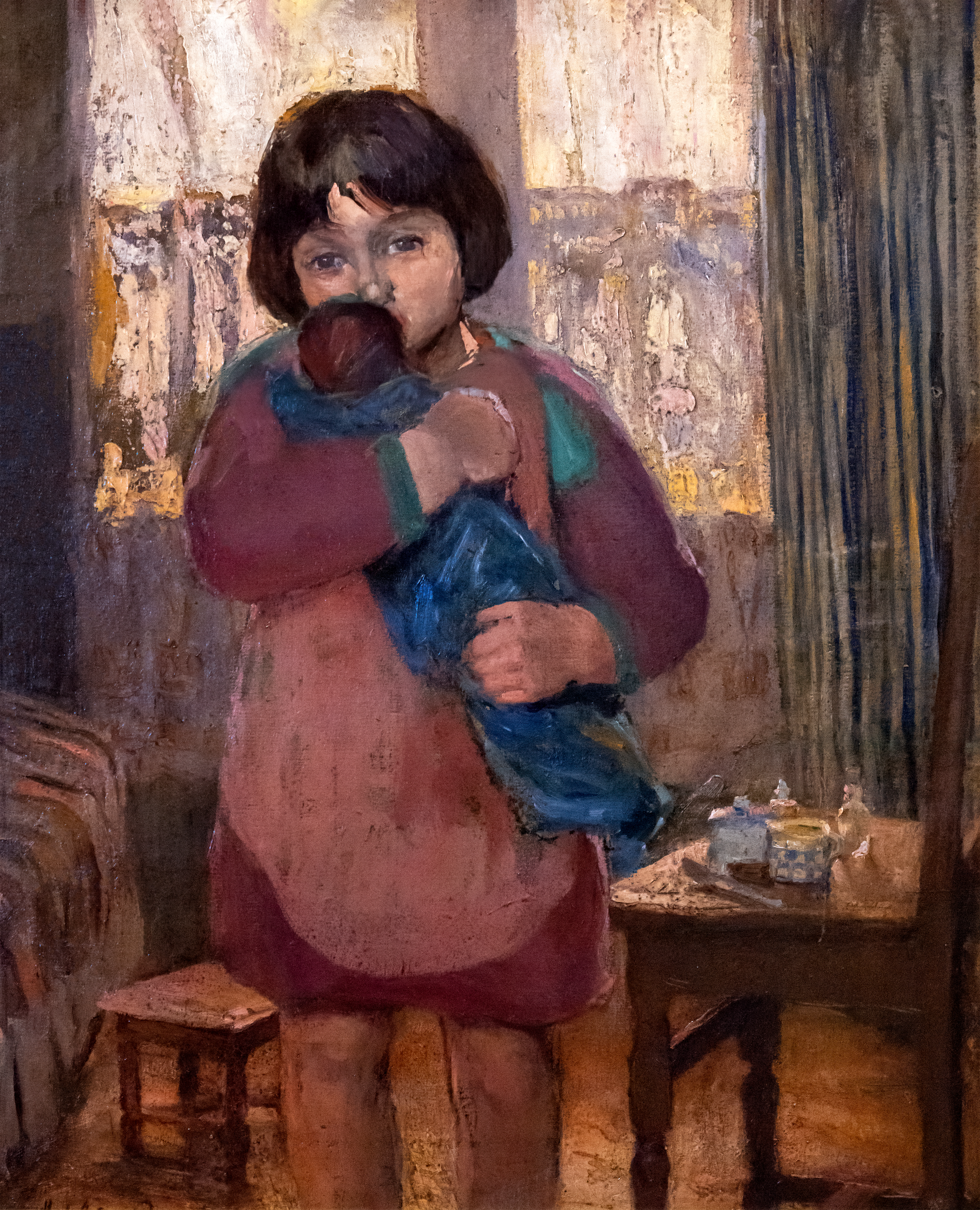
La poupée malade, ca.1925

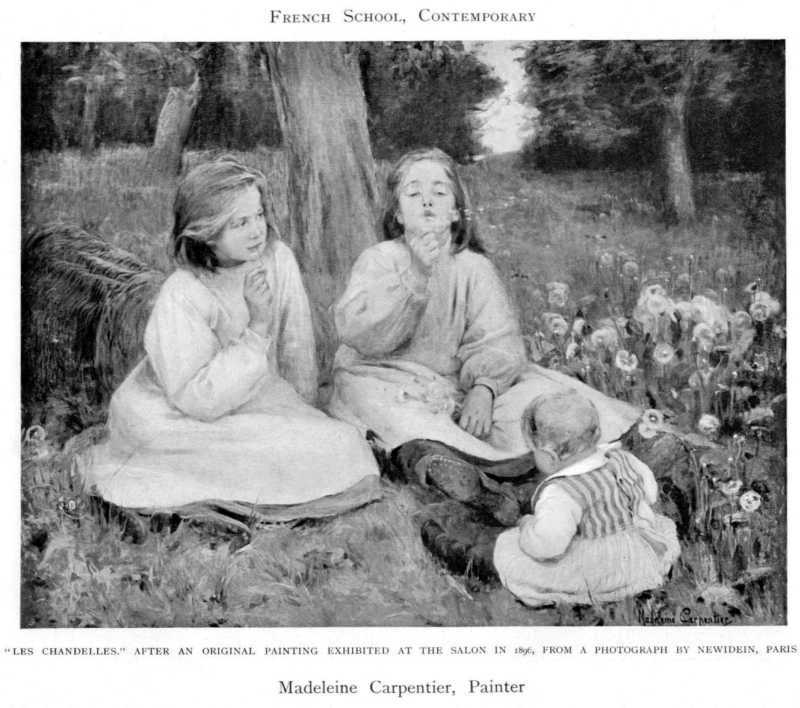
Les Chandelles, 1896

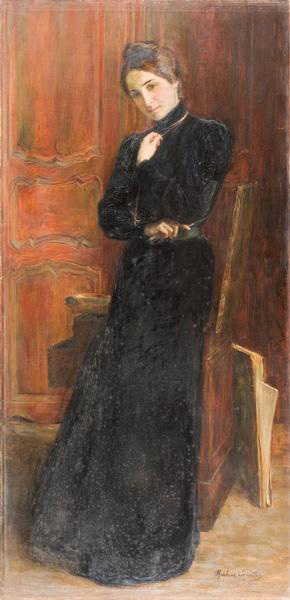
Portrait Marie-Paule Carpentier

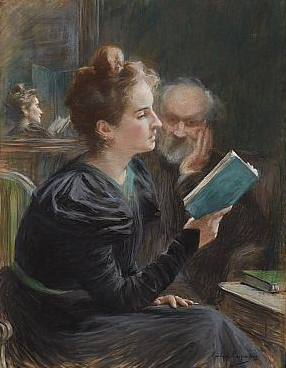
Portrait
