= Jean-Baptiste Favory =

French composer

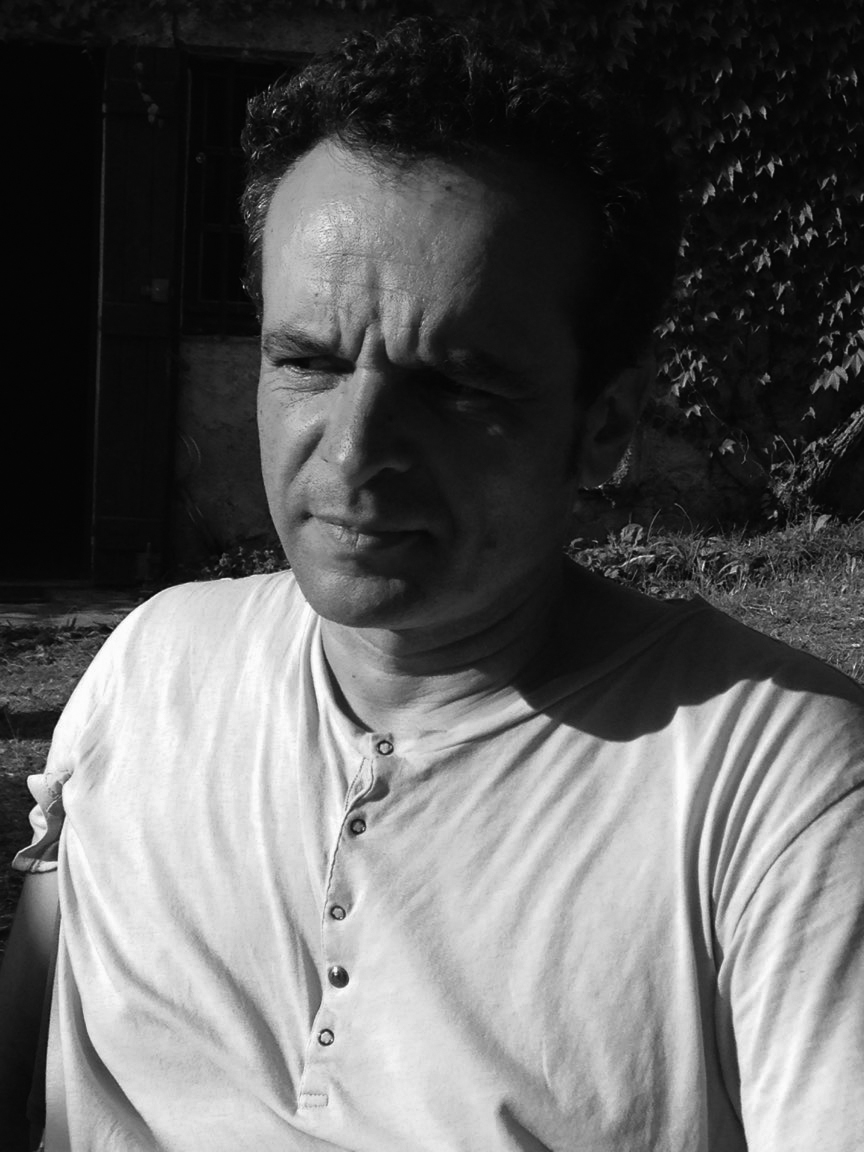
Jean-Baptiste Favory

Jean-Baptiste Favory (born 1967) is a French sound artist and composer of musique concrète, electronic and instrumental music.

== Biography ==
Jean-Baptiste Favory was born in Paris in 1967. His mother, Catherine Fournet (1945), is the daughter of conductor Jean Fournet. His father is actor Michel Favory (1940). After briefly studying piano in his early youth, he returned to music as a keyboardist for several rock bands in the 1980s. At the same time, he became interested in experimental music and, in 1990, he composed his first concrete pieces as an autodidact.

He began composing in 1989 and his first works were broadcast on the national French radio France Culture in 1994.

In 1995, he composed the first sound design for an Internet provider, Infogrames. The same year, he started working for theatre, composing sounds & musics for Victor Haïm.

From 1996 to 1999, he worked in Luc Ferrari's studios La Muse en circuit, and was assistant to Composers such as Gavin Bryars, Luc Ferrari and Brunhild Ferrari.

In 1997, he obtained a two-month residency in Monterrey, Mexico, to compose Leyendas Urbanas, a composition with a 180° video projection by Pierre Jacob premiered the planetarium of the city. Two years later, once again in Monterrey, he met the Mexican Free-rock group Los Lichis. Their collaboration led to Several concerts and recordings, In Mexico, France, and the USA.

From 1998 to 1999, he participated in masterclasses at the Iannis Xenakis musical center in Paris (CCMIX), where he studied from Jean-Claude Risset, Curtis Roads, Trevor Wishart, Gerard Pape and Julio Estrada. Thereafter, he obtained a 6-month residency in the CCMIX studios and became a sound engineer for Paul Méfano and Eliane Radigue.

From 1999 to this day, Jean-Baptiste Favory hosts the radio program Epsilona, dedicated to experimental music from the entire world. Some of his well known guests include: Eliane Radigue, Julio Estrada, Jean-Claude Risset, Gérard Pape, Denis Dufour, Jean-Claude Eloy, Michel Chion, Paul Méfano, Haino Keiji, Allain Gaussin, Bérangère Maximin.

Since 2000 he has contributed music and sound to various theater productions with directors Marcel Bluwal, Jean Gillibert and Gérard Maro.

In 2007, he joined the CLSI : "Circle for Liberation of Sounds and Images". This is a composers/performers' band created in 2007 for the interpretation of graphical scores with electronic devices in real time. The circle was directed by Paul Méfano and in 2008 and 2012 they performed concerts at the prestigious Stockhausen festival in Kürten. They recorded with saxophonist Yoshk'o Seffer, a former member of Magma.

At the end of 2022 and in 2023, the electronic piece "Des spheres" was broadcast during several shows at the planetarium of La Cité des Sciences et de l'Industrie in Paris, accompanied by a 360° video representing a journey through our galaxy over 51 minutes.

Favory's works are played in Europe and USA, and most of his works has been released on cd, lp and tapes in France, USA, Mexico, Russia and Great Britain.

"The imagination is effortlessly pushed to the limit: Favory's essential quality is to render the obvious without having to prove it."

== Works ==
- Crash test (1990)
- La partie pour le tout (1992)
- L’Eve future (1994)
- Hadaly habal (1994)
- Le grand conseil de Sirius a rendu son verdict (1995)
- Parasites! (1996)
- Leyendas urbanas (1997)
- Bruit mauve (1998)
- Thalassa (1999)
- Zona del silencio (2000)
- La bande à desseins (2001)
- Chicharra (2003)
- Pour les voyageurs (2005)
- Cosmos privé (2005)
- Big ending (2007)
- UNISONO I (2008)
- Le voyage immobile (2009)
- UNISONO II (2010)
- Bad tape nostalgia (2011)
- UNISONO III (2011)
- UNISONO IV (2011)
- Fading spaces (2013)
- Microsphères (2014)
- El ojo doble (2015)
- Things under -Organic compositions for guitars & electronics- (2016)
- Le passager (2017)
- UNISONO V (2018)
- db -David Bowie's seven lives- (2018)
- Parades (2019)
- Postlude (2020)
- Ciels (2021)
- Voladores (2022)
- PAUL & paul (2023)
- La grande marée (2024)
- Le miroir à 3 faces (2025)
- E.L.I.A.N.E (r) (2026)

== Discography ==
- La grande marée (CD ACEL 2026)
- I was thinking (CD Feeding tube records 2025)
- Les signes au loin (CD ACEL 2024)
- Des sphères (LP ACEL 2022)
- Ciels (CD Feeding tube records 2022)
- Le passager (CD ACEL 2019)
- Cosmos privé (CD ACEL 2017)
- Things under (LP Feeding tube records 2017)
- Voyage immobile (CD OBS records 2015)
- UNISONO (CD entr'acte 2012)
- Big endings (CD Entr'acte 2010)

Collaborations :

- Los Lichis : Eerie breedings (LP L'eau des fleurs records 2023)
- Los Lichis : Small Mole & The Flavor Jewel Trio (EP Ever/Never records 2022)
- Los Lichis : ( LP Feeding tube records 2016)
- Los Lichis : Cheap funeral music (Cassette Loki records 2016)
- CLSI / Yochk'o Seffer / Thollem McDonas : Rencontres électriques (CD ACEL 2016)
- Jiyo et Yebi : Impro sessions 2013/2014 (double CD Leo Torres production 2015)
- Los Lichis : Dog (double LP 2012)
- Bad tape nostalgia et Motor revers with Lionel Marchetti (Tape Banned productions 2011)
- Spirit of the matter : Zuble land (CD, Musea 2009)
- 100.000 Années : Split CD with Lionel Marchetti. Piece: Des sphères (CD Monotype records 2006)
- Documents : D10a, (LP Textile records 2002)

Compilations :

- CRU3 : Le passager (Editions F.Acquaviva 2017)
- Le train fantôme : Bruit mauve -extrait- (Studio forum 1999)
- Zone de rêves : Eve (Studio forum 2002)
- Détonnants Voyages : Leyendas Urbanas – extrait- (Studio forum 2003)
- Lieu-non lieu, hörspiel IV : Zona del silencio (La Muse en circuit 2000)

== Essays ==
- Un Art électronique libre (TK21 Webzine)
- Un Art musical libre, essay about the music of Jean-Baptiste Favory in la revue des ressources
- Interview by Philippe Robert in his book Agitation Friiite (Third volume dedicated to the French musical underground).
- A portrait of composer Frédéric Acquaviva in the revue Freeing (Our Bodies)#2
- L’orchestre virtuel et la musique de film. (Interview about virtual orchestras with Jean-Claude Eloy).
- Le design sonore. (The sound design).
- L'orchestre virtuel dans le film "Gravity". (The virtual orchestra in the movie "Gravity").
- Composer avec les stations audio-numériques.. Composing with a Digital Audio Workstation.
