= Los Lichis =

Mexican free-rock group

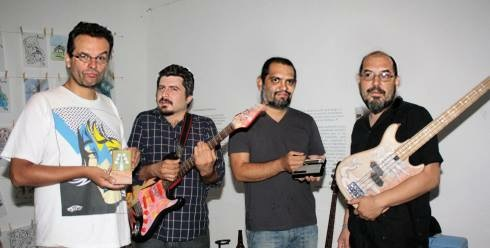
Los Lichis, Mexico 2012

Los Lichis is a Mexican free-rock group founded in 1996 and based in Monterrey and Mexico City. The band first worked as a multimedia concept art collective but later moved to musical improvisations with a Lo-fi sound. In 2000, French composer Jean Baptiste Favory joined the group. The band has also performed under aliases, such as "Cacaflies" and "Chavilocos & The Butchers Filarmonika".

== History ==
In 1996, three visual artists, Manuel Mathar, Gerardo Monsivais, and José-Luis Rojas, met one another at the University of Monterrey in Mexico and started playing any musical instrument that was around. They developed a series of artistic practices as a form of social interaction among friends. They developed their ideas through multiple art forms such as music, drawing, painting, photo, video, installation and performances. There is a large number of recordings of their musical improvisations using Lo-fi instruments. The band name, “Lichis”, is a Mexican slang reference of a skinny stray dog, who fleetingly visited them one rainy night in their apartment. "Lichis" then became an aesthetic symbol, in their own idiosyncrasy, of a low and precarious form of life.

Los Lichis collective showed their projects in some of the most important alternative art venues of the late '90s in Mexico (La Panadería, X-Teresa Arte Actual, BF15 Gallery). Their art is an act of freedom with a strong dose of bizarre humor, playing with the role of an author, not showing up as protagonists, and letting the work develop under external and unpredictable circumstances. During their first music performances, the band was improvising for hours in a closed room, separated from the audience. This way, the group was able to keep the amusement and freshness of a private music rehearsal. Los Lichis is not a conventional band playing in local rock venues, and thus, their appearances were mostly in public cultural spaces.

The relationship Los Lichis had with the former French-Mexican gallery BF 15, carried Monsiváis and Mathar to show their work at Paris's International Contemporary Art Fair (FIAC) in 2000. It was there that they met the experimental musician Jean-Baptiste Favory for improvisations, as part of the exhibition in their booth during the fair. They also broadcast a live performance through Epsilonia, an experimental music program ran by Favory in Radio Libertaire. Jean-Baptiste then became the fourth member, enriching the group's musical baggage. In 2003, they played at Sonic Protest festival in Paris.

The first decade of the 21st century began with a progressive break in the artistic production of the group. This was in part due to the growing commitment of each member with their individual projects, but also because of the disappointment and boredom they felt about the contemporary art circuit.

Despite this, and a temporary recess of Jose-Luis, their musical practice continued giving birth to more complex experiments. This was reinforced with the collaboration of guitarist Alfonso Gutiérrez (1974 – 2007), drummer Gildardo Gonzalez, and graphic artist Sergio de Osio. In Osio's workshop, many Lichis’ flyers, posters, T-shirts, and CDs were printed. Occasionally, they appeared under different names, such as "Cacaflies" or "Chavilocos & The Butchers Filarmonika". The band varied in a wide range of influences including psychedelic, krautrock, punk, avant-garde, free-jazz, folk or electronic music.

By the end of 2009, they returned to the original line-up, reincorporating Jose-Luis Rojas (1975 - 2017) and working on a compilation project on their own that concluded in the summer of 2013 with a double LP 12" Dog, compounding the first ten years of the group in 90 minutes. In 2015, they released a new limited edition CD entitled "The Giant Lichis". Both of these albums have been positively reviewed by music critic Byron Coley in British Magazine, The Wire. Also in 2015, the U.S. based label Feeding Tube Records, owned by Coley, re-released 500 copies of “Dog” distributed worldwide by Forced Exposure. Los Lichis is regarded as one of the most important underground acts in Mexico.

“Twenty years and Los Lichis are there, they appear and disappear, but when they let out the sound trail from their instruments, they surely leave their mark.” Mexican music critic, David Cortés states.

"Los Lichis retain that naturalistic spark and simmering wildness that only the best improvised music can provide." wrote Robert Ham of Pitchfork magazine.

== Discography ==
=== LPs ===
- Eerie breedings (LP L'eau des fleurs records 2023)
- Small Mole & The Flavor Jewel Trio (LP Ever/Never records 2022)
- Savage Lichis religion (Los Lichis & Pakito Bolino) - Feeding tube records (2018)
- Dog (double LP) - Feeding tube records (2016)
- Dog (double LP) - Self-released 300 signed copies (2013)

=== CDs ===
- Ligatripa compilation (Universal / Conaculta 2001)
- XTAA compilation (Conaculta 2003)

=== DVD ===
- Savage Religions (Le Dernier Cri 2006)
- Ready Media compilation (INBA / Conaculta 2010)

=== Cassette releases ===
- Cheap funeral music - Loki records 015 on

=== CDr / DVDr ===
- Los Lichis Compil I, II, III y IV (1997-1999)
- Obrera Sessions I y II (2000)
- Andador 20 (2000)
- Lichis en Paris Live Radio Libertaire (2000)
- Dulces Nombres (2001)
- Los Lichis Hits Collection #1 (2002)
- KKflies kill all the Lichis (Pantano Records 2003)
- Klassix '97 (Vuélvete Underground 2006)
- Chavilocos and the butchers filarmonika (2008)
- Live music soundtrack for the film The Cabinet of Dr Caligari (Robert Wiene) (2005)
- Los Lichis DVD 126 Traqcxzs 98-08 (2008)
- The Giant Lichis (2015)

== Members ==
- Gerardo Monsivais : visual artist, painter; drums, guitar, synths.
- Manuel Mathar : visual artist, painter; bass, guitar, violin, voice.
- Jose-Luis Rojas : visual artist, sculptor; synths & guitar.
- Jean-Baptiste Favory : sound artist; synths & electronics.
- Past members : Alfonso Gutiérrez - guitar (2001 - 2007); Gildardo González - drums (2001 - 2008).
