= Sonic Protest =

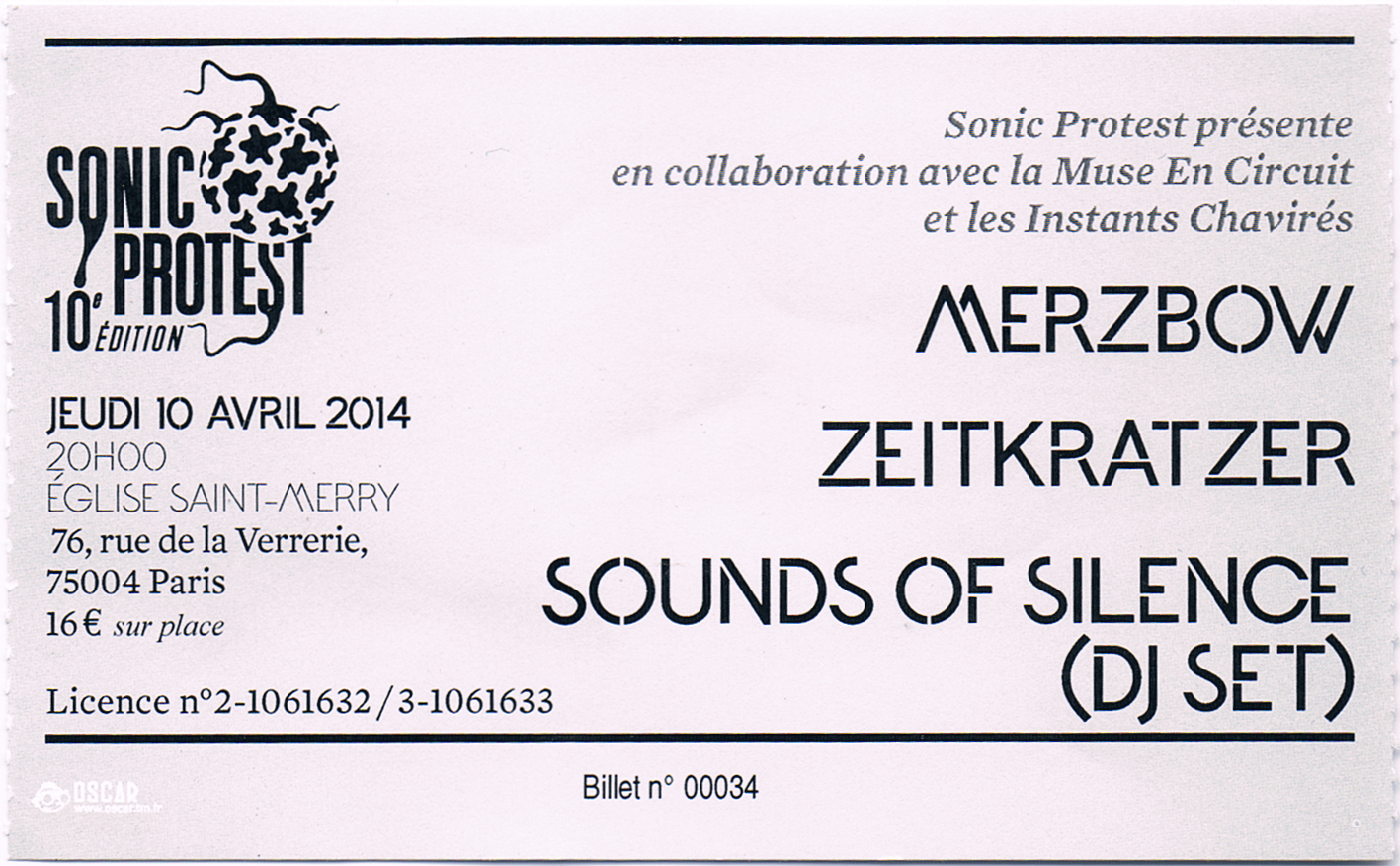
- Dates: April
- Locations: Paris, France
- Years active: 2003–present
- Website: www.sonicprotest.com

Sonic Protest is a yearly music festival in France focused on left field music genres like experimental rock, electroacoustic music, improvised music, noise and avant garde music.

The first edition of Sonic Protest took place in 2003. The editions from 2003 till 2011 took place in Paris. Acts like Deerhoof, Shit & Shine, Noël Akchoté, Charles Hayward, Keiji Haino and many others have performed at this festival. At the 2006 and 2008 editions compilation cds with all the artists featured on the festival were released The 2012 edition was set up bigger than the predecessing editions and took place in five cities: Paris, Reims, Marseille, Dijon and Tours. Local organisations such as GRIM in Marseille, supported the festival in the other cities.

== Line up 2003 ==
Hawk and Hacksaw, Sunroof, Lena Circus, Anla Courtis, Documents, Los Lichis.

== Line up 2004 ==
Pelt, Noxagt, Jérôme Noetinger, Blood Stereo, and others

== Line up 2005 ==
Chewbacca, Duracell, Esquilax, Excepter, Gang Gang Dance, Magik Markers, Volt, and others

== Line up 2006 ==
Volcano The Bear, Monno, Don Caballero, Hair Police, Ben Wallers, Bul Bul (AU), Viki, and others. We Jam Econo (documentary about Minutemen

== Line up 2007 ==
No-Neck Blues Band, Astral Social Club, Tetuki Akiyama, Harry Merry, and others

== Line up 2008 ==
Deerhoof, Parenthetical Girls, Dimension X, Noël Akchoté, Shit and Shine, Jean-Louis Costes, and others

== Line up 2010 ==
Fred Bigot, Vincent Epplay, Aarnaud Maguet, Opera Mort, Dum Dum Boys, and others.

== Line up 2011 ==
Pekka Airaksinen (FI), Das Synthetische Mischgewebe (DE, FR), Dror Feiler (SE), Rinji Fukuoka (JP), Sachiko (JP), Andrew Chalk & Timo van Luijk, Astma (RU), Sightings (US), Tom Smith, K-Branding (BE), and others.

== Line up 2012 ==
- Paris: Rice Corpse, Jozef van Wissem, Tony Conrad, Kim Fowley, Keiji Haino, Flipper, Terrie Ex (The Ex & Paal Nilssen-Love), Eugene S. Robinson, Truus de Groot, Plus Instruments, Tapetronic, and others
- Marseille: Tony Conrad, Chantal Morte, Keiji Haino, Terrie Ex & Paal Nilsson-Love, Bim Johnson, Yuri Landman (Home Swinger workshop & ensemble performance), and others.
- Reims: Terrie Ex & Paal Nilssen-Love, Super Reverb, Justice Yeldham, Tapetronic and others.
- Tours: Super Reverb, Plus Instruments, Tapetronic
- Dijon: Keiji Haino, Tapetronic

== Line up 2013 ==
- The Dead C
- The Red Krayola
- ...

== Line up 2014 ==
- Merzbow
- Lee Ranaldo
- Thurston Moore
- ...
