= Frédéric Acquaviva =

French composer and sound artist

Frédéric Acquaviva (born 20 January 1967) is a French autodidact experimental composer and avant-garde sound artist living between Paris, Berlin and London who works with voices, instruments, electronics, film and body sounds.

In 2020, he was awarded the prestigious Karl Sczuka Prize for his music "ANTIPODES". In 2022, "Seminal" was presented "Hors Competition" at Phonurgia Nova for the Sound Artwork of the year.

Acquaviva has been prolific on the underground/experimental music scene since 1990, working with major figures of the historical avant-garde including Isidore Isou, Marcel Hanoun, Pierre Guyotat, Bernard Heidsieck, Maurice Lemaître and Henri Chopin. as well as people from a more recent experimental scene like poets-artists Jean-Luc Parant, Joël Hubaut, lettrist Broutin, poet-film maker F. J. Ossang, choreograph Maria Faustino, Maîtresse Cindy, cello Anton Lukoszewieze, violin Chihiro Ono, trombone player Thierry Madiot, pianist Mark Knoop, harpist Helen Sharp, flutist Carin Levine, Bartosz Glowacki (accordion) and mezzo-soprano Lore Lixenberg.

As the creator of "chronopolyphonic" installations, he works on the notion of "oxymoron" and in the intersection of instrumental or voice with computer editing since 1990, sometimes including video-texts or live streams, mixing a conceptual approach with physical body sounds. His music pieces are thought from the compositional phase to the form of the final objet, as people could see at his retrospective sound exhibition "Frédéric Acquaviva, Music & Multiples Multiple Musics" at La Plaque Tournante, Berlin, in 2017 or with the first exhibition of his magazine CRU curated by Martha Willette Lewis at Institute Library, New Haven or the comprehensive exhibition of his editions at Librarie-Galerie Lecointre et Drouet in Paris in 2018.

His work has been performed in concert halls and also galleries like Palais de Tokyo and Centre Pompidou in Paris, Moderna Museet Stockholm, Weserburg Museum in Bremen, The Turbine Hall at the Tate Modern in London, La Fenice in Venice, Fylkingen in Stockholm, Pauline Oliveros Deep Listening Institute and Phill Niblock Experimental Intermedia in New York, Gallery Lara Vincy in Paris, gallery WhiteBox in New York City, Le Lieu, Québec, Spor Festival in Aarhus, Futura Festival in Crest, Licences Festival in Paris, ZKM in Karlsruhe, XP in Beijing, Hamburger Bahnhof and Berghain am Kantine in Berlin, Palazzo Bertalazzone in Torino. He has also created works for radios all around the world: France Culture, Radio Libertaire, BBC-Radio3, Resonance FM, WGXC Radio New York, Deutschlandradio Kultur, RadioWebMacba, Radio Canada.

The music critic Franck Mallet wrote a three-page essay: "Introducing Frédéric Acquaviva" in art magazine Art Press no. 393, Paris, October 2012 and in 2018 Yoann Sarrat published a special issue of his magazine "Freeing (Our Bodies) #2" on the music of Frédéric Acquaviva with 39 contributions including Henri Chopin, Maurice Lemaître, Dorothy Iannone, ORLAN, Jacques Lizène, Michel Giroud Jean-François Bory, Philip Corner, Jean-Baptiste Favory, Bernard Heidsieck, Tom Johnson, Esther Ferrer...

He received a command from the French Ministry of Culture in 1998, from ACR (France Culture) in 1999 and 2018, Motus/Palais de Tokyo in 2009 and has been in composing residency at CEIIDA (Monterrey, Mexico, 2023), Emily Harvey Foundation Venice (2009, 2011 and 2016), EMS studios in Stockholm (2015 and 2019) and also won the Beinecke Fellowship Yale University USA (2012 and 2017), as well as have been curating since 2003 more than 40 exhibitions on avant-garde art and poetry (Gil J Wolman and Isidore Isou among others) in museums such as Barcelona Museum of Contemporary Art (MACBA), Serralves, Museo Reina Sofia. In June 2019 Acquaviva was awarded the Price for Best Contemporary Art Book of the Year with his first ever monograph on Isidore Isou's artworks (Editions du Griffon) at FILAF.

With voice-artist and mezzo-soprano Loré Lixenberg, he founded the artist and experimental music space La Plaque Tournante in Berlin in 2014, which is based on AcquAvivArchives, consisting of a massive archive of Lettrist and experimental documents or artworks from the mid 20th century to the present day, alongside Acquaviva's own music archive. La Plaque Tournante has received the Berlin Senate Prize in 2017 for one of the best artist spaces, after 12 exhibitions.

He also runs the CD-DVD-Web Site-Magazine CRU (present in the collections of the Centre Pompidou, Paris; MACBA, Barcelona; Fondazione Bonotto, Italy).

Acquaviva has also published more than 100 publications, and apart his own musical work and multiples (published by Al Dante or Les Presses du Réel), many artist books spanning Lettrism, Body and Bio art, Sonic art and composers under the labels Casus Belli, Editions AcquAvivA, £@B and B@£.

== Works ==
- Oeuvre (1990) for piano pedal
- Coma (1991–1992 / rev. 1995–1996), text Pierre Guyotat, for voice, computer and 16 electric guitars
- Sens Unique(s) (1994–1995), hörspiel for voices, 4 violins, 4 electric guitars and sampler
- K. Requiem (1993–1999), text F. J. Ossang, for voices, electronic and ensemble
- Tri (2000), chronopolyphonic sound installation
- Oreilles Vides (2000), for voice-computer
- Et.. et... et (1999/ rev. 2003), for voice, electronic and ensembles
- L'Infra Cantate (1998 / rev. 2004), for voice, accordion, violin and electronic
- X, 4, 3 (2006), for 3 BDSM sound bodies and electronic
- Musique Acataleptique (2007), text JL Parant, for voice, house field recordings and electronic
- Exercice Spirituel (2007), for any sound
- 4 Etudes Animales (2008), for toilet seat and dog
- Musique Elastique (2009), for elastic and Joël Hubaut
- Ledisque (2009), for voice
- Edisquel (2009), for harpsichord
- Disquele (2009), for electronics
- Isqueled (2009), for voice and harpsichord
- Squeledi (2009), for voice and electronics
- Queledisc (2009), for harpsichord and electronics
- Uelediscq (2009), for voice, harpsichord and electronics
- Eledisq (2009–2010), for voice, harpsichord and electronics
- Le Disque (2009–2010), for voice, harpsichord, electronics and screens
- {...} (2010), for ensemble of ensembles in extension and live streaming
- Musiques Convergentes (2000–2017), for various media and ensembles
- Musique Pédagogique (2011), for and against any audience
- Aatie-Fragment (2010–2011), for mezzo-soprano, variable ensemble and video
- Aatie (2010–2011), for mezzo-soprano, variable ensemble and video
- Musique Démotique (2011), for a mobile transmitter
- Musique Hiératique (2011), for a mobile transmitter
- Musique Cabalistique (2012), for a fixed receptor
- Loré Ipsum (2011–2012), for mezzo-soprano(s) and dead electronics
- Musique Antiparaskevidekatriaphobique et Antitriskaidekaphobique (2013), for a specific date
- Musique Athlétique (2014), for 2 break (core) dancers and mobile sound sources
- Self-Portrait Music (2015), for any instrument
- Musique Algorithmique (2015), for advertising demonstrator
- Paradoxical Sleep Music (2015), for voice or video
- Kiss Music (2015), for 2 voices
- Du Singe au Porc (2015), for 258 French sound sources and voice
- Ape to Pig (2015–2017), for 258 French sound sources, voice and videotext
- Musique Thérapeutique (2016), for curator and ill audience
- The 120 Day of Musica (2015–2017), for variable instrumentation
- mess (2016), for a voice artist
- MESS (2015–2017), for mezzo, mouths, skins, buchla and videotext
- £pØ@n®diØ$n (2018), concerto for town and voice
- deadline (2019), for voice and Jean-François Bory
- ANTIPODES (2019), for the voices of Joël Hubaut (+ texts), Dorothy Iannone, Loré Lixenberg; dead electronics and video
- Seminal (2020–2021), for speakerine (ORLAN), vocal quartet (Joan La Barbara, Loré Lixenberg, Wills Morgan, Jacques Lizène), orchestra (124 players) and dead electronics
- Musique Posthume (2021), for a performer and dead electronics
- Hyperosmic Music (2023), for dispositive
- No Soy Un Robot (2023), for countertenor, parrots, different voices and dead electronics
- Demoliciones / Mariachi (2023), 4 songs for 7 mariachis
