= Gérard Pape =

American classical composer (born 1955)

Gérard Pape (born April 22, 1955 in Brooklyn, New York) is a composer of electronic music, author, and Lacanian psychologist. He is a former student of David Winkler, George Cacioppo, William Albright, and George Balch Wilson. He became the director of Les Ateliers UPIC (now CCMIX) in 1991 and in 2015 authored a French-English bi-lingual book Musipoesc: Writings About Music that was published by Éditions Michel de Maule. Pape has lived and worked in France since the early 1990s.

== Biography ==
Gérard Pape studied clinical psychology and music simultaneously at the University of Michigan, and is a practicing Lacanian psychoanalyst as well as a composer. After moving to France at the beginning of the 1990s, his compositions came under the influence of the Mexican composer Julio Estrada. Estrada shares with Pape an interest in psychoanalysis and focuses on what he calls "sound fantasies"—fantasies that occur "inside the head of the composer and take the form of sequences of sounds". Pape extended Estrada's conception by treating chaos as a formal concept. For example, in his opera-in-progress, Weaveworld, Pape "employs sudden and unpredictable patterns in streams of sound in a plasma that draws from chaos models". The tape part for Makbénach I and III convolves "timbre paths", made from chains of sampled saxophone sounds, together with a dense series of grains following particular trajectories (produced by a computer program called Cloud Generator), in order to produce timbral transformations.

Pape's 1995 chamber opera Monologue uses as text the Samuel Beckett play A Piece of Monologue. His most important work is Feu toujours vivant for large orchestra and 4 sampler keyboards (1997), which was commissioned by Art Zoyd and the Orchestre national de Lille, conducted by Jean-Claude Casadesus.

In 2007, Gerard Pape created the CLSI ensemble (Circle for the Liberation of Sounds & Images) with various musicians and composers such as Olga Krashenko, Paul Méfano, Jacqueline Méfano, Lissa Meridan, Michael Kinney, Martin Phelps, Rodolphe Bourotte, Stefan Tiedje, and Jean-Baptiste Favory.

== Compositions ==
=== Orchestra ===
- Cosmos, symphony for large orchestra and tape (1985)
- Three Faces of Death, for orchestra (1988–89)
- Feu toujours vivant, for large orchestra and four samplers (1997)

=== Opera and musical theater ===
- Ivan and Rena (text: Gérard Pape), music drama for reciter, three vocal soloists, orchestra, and tape (1983–84)
- A Little Girl Dreams of Taking the Veil, surrealist opera for tape and slides; texts and slides by Max Ernst (1990)
- Monologue, chamber opera based on Samuel Beckett’s play, A Piece of Monologue, for bass voice and eight-channel tape (1995)
- Weaveworld (in progress), after the novel by Clive Barker
  - Battle, for four vocal soloists and tape (1996),
  - Weaveworld Prologue, for bass, flute, oboe, clarinet, bassoon, trumpet, trombone, horn, percussion, 2 violins, viola, cello, contrabass (1998)
- Les Cenci, opera in four acts, for seven vocal soloists, orchestra of 24 flutes, three percussionists, tape, and live electronics (text: Antonin Artaud) (2000– )

=== Chamber music (with or without electronics) ===
- Soundbook, for instruments and live electronics (1982)
- Tableaux, for acoustic and electronic instruments (1983)
- In Memoriam: George Cacioppo, for eight trombones, two percussionists, and tape (1984)
- String Quartet No. 1 "Fire and Ice" (1984)
- String Quartet No. 2 "Vortex" (1988–89)
- X-Stasis, for ensemble and tape (1992)
- Le Fleuve du désir III, for string quartet and tape (1994)
- Le Fleuve du désir IV, for eight solo violins, or one violin, tape, and live electronics (1994/2002)
- Makbénach I, for saxophone, ensemble, and tape (1996)
- Makbénach II, for saxophone and ensemble (1996)

=== Solo instrument (with electronics) ===
- Recordare, for soprano recorder, live electronics, and tape (1984)
- Cerberus, for organ and tape (1987)
- That Burning Thing, for flute and tape (1989)
- Le Fleuve du désir V, for violin, tape, and live electronics (1994)
- Le Fleuve du désir VI, for viola, tape, and live electronics (1994)
- Le Fleuve du désir VII, for cello, tape, and live electronics (1994)
- Le Fleuve du désir VIII, for contrabass, tape, and live electronics (1994)
- Makbénach III, for saxophone, live electronics, and tape (1996)
- Makbénach IV, for trombone, live electronics, and tape (1998)
- Aquarelles, for basset horn doubling clarinet, tape, and live electronics (1999)
- La Naissance du son, for amplified cello (2002)
- For Maurizio, for amplified viola (2003)
- Ascension au Purgatoire, for percussion and computer (2004)

=== Vocal music ===
- Pour un Tombeau d'Anatole, for voice, saxophones, and percussion (1984)
- Catachresis, for soprano and chamber orchestra (1987)
- La Tristesse de la lune (text: Charles Baudelaire), for baritone, soprano (pre-recorded), and tape (1986)
- Two Electro-Acoustic Songs for soprano, flute, and tape; poems by Dahlia Ravicovitch (1993)
- Funeral Sentences, for two sopranos, percussionist, and live electronics (1998)
- The Ecstasy of St. Theresa (homage to Bernini) (text: St. Theresa of Ávila), for nine mixed voices and live electronics (2001)

=== Electronic music ===
- Triple Requiem, for multiple tapes and turntables (1982)
- Dreamwake (texts: Gérard Pape), for tape (1984)
- Resonance, for tape (1984)
- Prélude Electronique, for tape (1992)
- Variations Varèsiennes, for tape (1992)
- Le Fleuve du désir II. for UPIC-generated tape (1994)
- Fabula, for eight-channel tape (1999)
- Mon autre Peau, installation for 20-channel tape and DVD (based on paintings by Ana-Paula Portilla with digital video by Anney Bonney; texts by Ana-Paula Portilla, Parmenides, and the Upanishads) (1999)
- Tantric Transformations, for eight-channel tape and digital video; video by Anney Bonney (2000)
- Clouds for six-channel tape (2002)

== Sources ==
- CCMIX Paris. 2001. Mode Records 2-CD set, MDE 98.
- McHard, James L. 2006. The Future of Modern Music: A Vibrant New Modernism in Music for the Future, second edition. Livonia, Michigan: Iconic Press; Salt Lake City: American University & Colleges Press. ISBN 0-9778195-0-7.
- Makan, Keeril. 2003. "An Interview with Gerard Pape". Computer Music Journal 27, no. 3 (Fall): 21–32.

Footnotes
