= Bernard Heidsieck =

Bernard Heidsieck (November 28, 1928 – November 22, 2014) was a French sound poet, associated with various movements throughout a long career: including Beat, American Fluxus, and minimalism.

Heidsieck was born in Paris. In the course of his career, he served as vice-president of the Banque Française du Commerce Extérieur in Paris and as president of the Commission Poésie at the Centre national du livre.

He organised the first international festival of sound poetry in 1976 and the event Rencontres Internationales 1980 de poésie sonore which took place in Rennes, in Le Havre and at the Pompidou Centre in Paris.

== Bibliography ==
- Sitôt dit, Seghers, 1955.
- B2B3, Éditions du Castel Rose, 1964.
- "Trois biopsies" et "Un passe - partout", 1970
- Portraits-Pétales, Guy Schraenen, 1973,
- D2 + D3Z, Poèmes-Partitions, Collection Où, Henri Chopin Éditeur, 1973.
- Partition V, Éditions du Soleil Noir, 1973.
- Encoconnage, avec Françoise Janicot, Guy Schraenen, 1975
- Foules, Guy Schraenen Éditeur, 1975 (Belgique).
- Poésie action / Poésie sonore 1955-1975, Atelier Annick Le Moine, 1976.
- Participation à Tanger I et Tanger II, Christian Bourgois Éditeur, 1978, 1979.
- Dis-moi ton utopie, Éditions Eter, 1975.
- Poésie sonore et caves romaines suivi de Poème-Partition D4P, Éditions Hundertmark, RFA, 1984.
- Heidsieck et Hubaut, (cassette) avec Joël Hubaut, 1984
- P puissance B, avec Radio Taxi(c), Lotta Poetica and Studio Morra, 1984
- Au delà de la poésie, with Julien Blaine and Servin, with drawings by Jean Touzot, L'Unique, 1985
- Canal Street, SEVIM/ B. Heidsieck, 1986
- Poésie et dynamite (with a text by Jean-Jacques Lebel), Factotumbook 38, Sarenco-Strazzer, 1986
- Derviche / Le Robert, Éditeurs Évidant, 1988.
- Poème-Partition "A", Électre Éditeur, 1992.
- D'un art à l'autre (Poésure et Peintrie), Ville de Marseille, 1993
- Poème-Partition "R", Cahiers de nuit, Caen, 1994.
- Poème-Partition "N", Les Petits classiques du grand pirate, 1995.
- Morceaux choisis supplément à Bernard Heidsieck Poésie Action, Jean-Michel Place, (CD), 1996
- Coléoptères and Co, with P.A. Gette, Yéo Éditeur, Paris, 1997.
- Poème-Partition "T", with a CD, Derrière la Salle de bains, 1998.
- Vaduz, avec un CD, Francesco Conz Éditeur/Al Dante éditeur, 1998.
- La Fin d'un millénaire, catalogue Ventabrun Art Contemporain, 2000
- Poème-Partition "Q", Derrière la salle de bains, 1999 + une autre édition en 2001.
- Bonne Anée, avec Yoland Bresson, Éditions du toit, 1999
- Respirations et brèves rencontres, with 3 CDs, Al Dante Éditeur, 2000. (aussi en K7)
- Nous étions bien peu en ..., Onestar Press, 2001.
- Partition V, with 1 CD, réédition, Le Bleu du Ciel, 2001
- Canal Street, with 2 CDs, Al Dante Éditeur, 2001.
- Poème-Partition "F", with 1 CD, Le Corridor bleu Éditeur, 2001. (aussi en K7)
- Le carrefour de la chaussée d'Antin, with 2 CDs, Al Dante, 2001
- Partition V, Le Bleu du Ciel, 2001
- Notes convergentes, Al Dante Éditeur, 2001. (aussi en K7)
- La poinçonneuse, with 1 CD, Al Dante Éditeur, 2003.
- Ca ne sera pas long, fidel Anthelme X, 2003.(CD)
- Lettre à Brion, CD, Al Dante Éditeur, 2004.
- Derviche; Le Robert, with 3 CDs, Al Dante éditeur, 2004.
- Démocratie II, with 1 CD, Al Dante éditeur, 2004.
- Spermatozoïdes I (Collection Acquaviva / Derrière la Salle de Bains), 2008
- Bernard Heidsieck, Ici Radio Verona (edited by Frédéric Acquaviva, Editions Francesco Conz, Verona), 2010
- Spermatozoïdes II, Editions AcquAvivA, 2012
- Spermatozoïdes III, Editions AcquAvivA, 2012
