= Anla Courtis =

Argentine musician (born 1972)

Alan Courtis
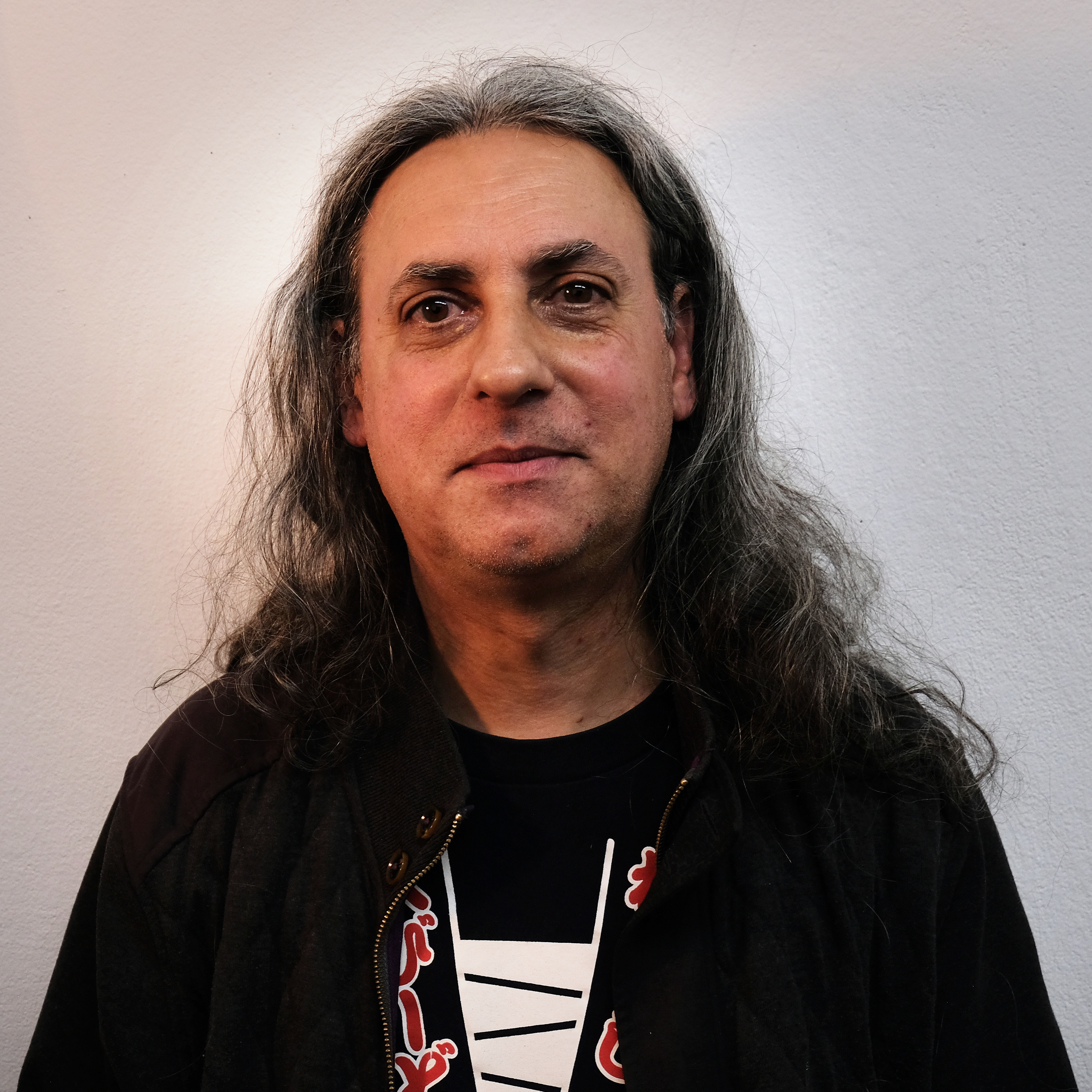

Background information
- Also known as: Reynols, Alan Courtis, Courtis
- Born: 22 February 1972 (age 54); Buenos Aires, Argentina
- Origin: Buenos Aires, Argentina
- Genres: Electronic music, experimental music, psychedelic music, experimental techno
- Occupations: Artist, composer, sound artist, musician
- Years active: 1993–present
- Labels: Beta-lactam Ring Records, RRRecords, Antifrost, Sedimental, Nexsound, Fruits de Mer Records
- Website: geocities.com/a_courtis/

Alan Courtis (born February 22, 1972) is an Argentine musician, artist, composer and sound artist. He studied classical guitar, piano, theory and composition. He holds a degree in Communication Science from the University of Buenos Aires, where he currently runs an annual music workshop. He played electric guitar in diverse bands and in 1993 he co-founded the group Reynols. With this group he has released more than one hundred CDs and vinyls worldwide in labels like Trente Oiseaux, Digital Narcis, Drone Records, Locust, Sedimental, Beta-Lactam Ring Records, Celebrate Psi Phenomenon, RRR, Audiobot Records, Roaratorio, JDK, Reverse, Matching Head, American Tapes, Last Visible Dog, Carbon Records, Mikroton, etc.

Depending on the project, Courtis sometimes spells his first name "Anla". Miguel Tomasin, the Reynols drummer and singer, did so first, and then Courtis decided to adopt it as an artistic psuedonym.

== Discography ==
- Dimuzio/Wobbly Courtis "Redwoods Interpretive" (2021) Split-LP. Oscarson, Germany
- ANLA COURTIS & MAMA BAER & KOMMISSAR HJULER / NICOLA HEIN & STEVE DALACHINSKY "Possessed Anticipation" (2019) Split-LP. Psych.KG. Germany
- "Cassetopia" (2014) LP ini.itu. Indonesia/Belgium
- ANLA COURTIS, MAMA BAER & KOMMISSAR HJULER "Die Antizipation des Generalized Other" (2011) SHMF. Germany
- ALAN COURTIS, JAIME GENOVART, CHRISTOF KURZMANN, PABLO RECHE "Palmar Zähler" (2009) Mikroton Recordings CD 2. Russia
- "Unstringed Guitar & Cymbals" (2008) BN034CD. Blossoming Noise. US
- ANLA COURTIS, SEIICHI YAMAMOTO & YOSHIMI "Live at Kanadian" (2008) PE110. Public Eyesore. US
- "SHISHKABALA" (2009) CHOCOLATE CASKET REC. US.
- "Llegaron..." (2008) ltd. square 8".av008. Alt.Vinyl. UK
- "Live in Hamburg" (2008) Wachsender Prozess. Germany
- "Alarma Entrópica" (2008) cd-card. Ambolt28. Ambolthue. Norway
- "Las Sales Fundentes" (2007) 2xCD. Om05. OM Discos. Argentina
- "Algarrobina Sólida" (2007) Horrible Registros. Chile
- COURTIS-WEHOWSKY "Return of the Stone Spirits" (2007) Beta-Lactam Ring Records. US.
- TONY HERRINGTON/ALAN COURTIS (2007) jm#5 (limited canvas edition). Joint Multiples. UK
- MARHAUG/COURTIS "Jordslev Hojaldre" (2007) MC046. Quasipop. Ukraine
- "Live in Christiania" (2007) C-20. Beyond Repair Records. Denmark
- "250107" (2007) Lathe-CDr. P009. Produck. Germany
- "Broken Walkman Research" (2007) MHW. UK
- ÜL "II" (2007) FR001. Facon Records. Argentina
- "Live @ Imvated Motel" (2007) Incidental Recordings. Belgium
- ÜL "Astropecuario" (2007) Pjorn Records. Scotland. UK
- RECHE-COURTIS "Amsterdam 301005" (2007) Sounds from the Pocket. US
- "Psi Gtr Avalanche" (2007) yellow 7". Smittekilde. Denmark.
- BIRCHVILLE CAT MOTEL & ANLA COURTIS "Thee Sparkling Echoes" (2007) Celebrate Psi Phenomenon. New Zealand
- "Tape Works" (2006) P21040-2. Pogus Productions. US
- "H-Puna" (2006) GSA-18. GeneratorSoundArt. US
- COURTIS/KLINGSOR/VED "Live på På Besök"(2006) müss07. Mussigganger. Sweden
- DYLAN NYOUKIS & ANLA COURTIS "Fight the Pyramids" (2006) Choc-155. Chocolate Monk. UK
- "Live Actions" (2006) HL005. Herbal Records. Malaysia
- COURTIS-MOGLASS-KIRITCHENKO (2006). NS49.Nexsound/Carbon/1000+1Tilt/ Goldsoundz/Tibprod. Ukrania/US/Greece/Norway
- TORE H. BOE/ANLA COURTIS "Blot og Mono Middagshvil" (2006) Thisk037. Thisco. Portugal
- STROUNTES! Maria Eriksson, Mats Gustafsson & Anla Courtis (2006) Slottet. Sweden
- MUTANTEA "Sleepy Sounds Electric" (2006) Ikuisuus. Finland
- Culver/Courtis split tour tape (2006) MH130. Matching Head. UK
- "Noiselovlive" (2006) es51. Xerxes. Japan
- KAWABATA MAKOTO, ANLA COURTIS & ROKUGENKIN "Kokura" (2006) REPOSELP010. Riot Season. UK
- "Antiguos Dólmenes del Paleolítico" (2006) SEDCD042. Sedimental. US
- "(the name of this drone is hidden in your DNA)" (2006) Ikuisuus. Finland
- Courtis-Erkizia/Monopolka "Live in Peru" (2006) Monopolka. Russia
- Anla Courtis & Thomas Dimuzio "Live at the Luggage Store" (2006) Gench. US
- "Seattle Flow" (2006) kd24. Kningdisk. Sweden
- BILLY BAO "R'N'R Granulator" (2005) CD. W.M.O./R. Spain/UK
- "Live in Fukuoka" (2005) HODE113/K. Scrotum Records. Germany
- COURTIS_ MATSUNAGA collab CD (2005) Prele/Kokeko. France/Japan
- "Live in L.A." (2005) The Seedy R (Pseudo-Arcana). New Zealand
- RECHE-COURTIS "Transistores de Aire" (2005). Conv019. Con-V. Spain
- "Endless Cassette Research Vol.1" (2005) UCD21. Ultra. Russia
- COURTIS-ROMERO "Psychomemory of..." (2005) P36. P-Tapes. US
- COURTIS/THE SOVIET SEX MACHINES (2005) M60. Monopolka. Russia
- "Tribute to Calcium" (2005) tons019. Tonschacht. Germany.
- "(the name of this drone is hidden in your DNA)" (2004) Nidnod. UK.
- "Suite for Processed Marimbas" (2004) Audiobot. Belgium.
- "...y el resplandor de la luz no conoce limites." (2004) LTJ-25. 267 Lattajjaa. Finland
- CULVER-COURTIS (2004) Riot Season. UK.
- "Los Alamos" (2004) Celebrate Psi Phenomenon. New Zealand.
- "Recycled Music Tape" (2004) RRR. US
- COURTIS-MARHAUG "North & South Neutrino" (2004) afro2021. AntiFrost. Greece
- "Presencia de lo No-Manifestado en lo Manifestado" (2004) AST#0015. Astipalea. Poland
- "Harmonica F'ever" (2003) PS#8. Pink Skulls/Jewelled Antler. US
- "Fractal Albur Solenoide" (2003) 23CD0121. 23 Productions. US
- "Albumina Blues" (2001) Freedom From. US
- COURTISZAN (2000)(w/ Zan Hoffman) "Meretrix". C60. Zidsic. US
- "Greatest Hits" (1999) Lonely Whistle Music. US
- COURTIS/LATE (1999) "Failures in Modern Recording" C-30. White Tapes. US
- "Eating an Estufa" (1998) Freedom From. US
- CULVER-COURTIS (1997) Matching Head/F.D.R Tapes/Capeet. UK, US & Austria.
- "The Distorted Micromoog Atofia Vol.1" (1997) Komkol Autoprod. Norway.
- "Poliestireno Expandido" (1996) MH53. Matching Head. UK

== Performances ==
- No Music Festival. US. 2001
- DreamFestival. US. 2001
- Ny Musik. Norway. 2003
- Stockholm New Music Festival. Sweden. 2003
- Sonic Protest. Paris. France. 2003
- Podewil (Berlin*Buenos Aires). Germany 2004
- Live in de Living. Belgium. 2004
- Bag of Spoon. Paris. France. 2004
- Decibel Festival Buenos Aires. Argentina 2004
- Line Space Line. Los Angeles. US. 2005
- Common Sounds/Sonidos Comunes. Lima. Peru. 2005
- LEM Festival. Barcelona. Spain. 2005
- Ressort Off: Latin America. Netherlands. 2005
- Korona Experimental Intermedia. Koln. Germany. 2006
- No Spaghetti Edition Festival. Norway/Arg. 2005
- Decibel Festival Buenos Aires. Argentina. 2005
- Frankfurter Forum fur Elektronische und Neue Musik. Germany. 2005
- Interzones. Rennes. France. 2005
- Feria de la Artes. Bariloche. Argentina. 2006
- Niu Fest. Cordoba. Argentina. 2006
- Fin de la Ruta 5. La Pampa. Argentina. 2006
- Dans for Voksne. Oslo. Norway. 2006
- Potlach. Helsinki. Finland. 2006
- Koloni. Goteborg. Sweden. 2006
- Borealis Festival. Norway. 2006
- Epsilonia Radio Festival. France. 2006
- Territorio Electrico. Spain. 2006
- The Termite. Leeds. England. 2006
- Vamos Festival. Newcastle. England. 2006
- Qujocho. Linz. Austria. 2007
- Koloni. Goteborg. Sweden. 2007
- New Perspectives Festival. Vaasteras. Sweden 2007
