= George Balch Wilson =

American composer

George Balch Wilson (January 28, 1927 – October 12, 2021) was an American composer who is known for his contributions to electronic music. In 1955 he won the Prix de Rome for composition. He taught for more than 30 years on the faculty of the University of Michigan where he founded and directed the school's electronic music studio. Upon his retirement he was made a professor emeritus.

== Early life ==
Born in Grand Island, Nebraska, Wilson grew up in Lincoln. His father was an amateur flutist and clarinetist and his mother was a pianist who had earned money for his family accompanying silent films during the Great Depression. His parents often played duets together at home and took Wilson to local concerts by ensembles like the Lincoln Symphony. He also received music lessons from them. Although this exposure instilled a love for music within Wilson, the nervousness of public performance led to his eventual refusal to pursue further musical studies in his childhood. He later took piano lessons intermittently during his teenage years. His grandfather was a doctor in the small town of Rushville, Nebraska located near the Pine Ridge Indian Reservation and thus the family had opportunities during visits to interact with the local Sioux community. This was the beginning of Wilson's lifelong fascination with the art, history and languages of the Sioux, Hopi and Navaho cultures.

As a boy, Wilson developed an interest in photography and at the age of 12 he began working for the Lincoln regional office of the Natural Resources Conservation Service as a photo lab technician. At the age of 13 his family moved to Denver, Colorado where he worked as a lab technician for a portrait photographer while attending high school. At the age of 18 he became a radio operator gunner in the United States Air Force for a short time before being reassigned to the teaching staff at the Air Force Photographic School at Lowery Field. He became burned out on the business of photography while working there, coming to the realization that his real passion was music.

== Education ==
In 1947 Wilson entered the music program at the University of Michigan (UM) through funds provided by the G.I. Bill. He went on to earn a Bachelor of Music, a Master of Music, and a Doctor of Music, all in music composition, from the UM. Among his teachers as the UM were Percy Price, Homer Keller, and Ross Lee Finney. In 1953 he was awarded a Fulbright Scholarship which enabled him to pursue studies in Belgium and France. He notably studied with Jean Absil at the Brussels Conservatory and with Nadia Boulanger in both Paris and at the Fontainebleau Schools. He was awarded the Prix de Rome in 1955 which further extended his studies in Europe through 1958. During that time he pursued studies in Italy in electronic music. He later pursued further studies in that field with Milton Babbitt, Mario Davidovsky, Otto Luening, and Vladimir Ussachevsky at the Columbia-Princeton Electronic Music Center.

== Career ==
Wilson joined the music composition faculty of the University of Michigan in 1959 while a doctoral student at the school. He had already taught undergraduate courses in music theory at the UM as a teaching fellow while working on his master's degree. In 1962 he founded the UM's electronic music studio through funds provided by the Rackham Graduate School, directing the studio for the next 30 years. He patterned the studio after the Columbia-Princeton Electronic Music Center. In 1992 Wilson produced a concert in honor of the studio with works from many of the University's composition students at the time, including Evan Chambers, Leslie Hogan, Michael Angell and others. He was involved in Ann Arbor's experimental music and performance scene from the 1960s, participating in large installation pieces which involved quadrophonic music in downtown parking structures, or filling the halls of the University of Michigan Music School with inflatable plastic hallways, complete with electro-acoustic music piped in. For many years he drove about town in a green VW bug, which he occasionally drove through the center of the (pedestrian) Diag. His students include John Burke, George Crumb, Andrew Paul MacDonald, Evan Chambers, Frank Ticheli, and Gérard Pape.

== Selected works ==
- Adagio for strings and horns (1951)
- String Quartet in G (1952)
- Sonata for viola and piano (1952)
- Fantasy for violin and piano (1955–1956)
- Concatenations for 12 instruments (1969)
- Exigencies for 8-channel tape
- Cornices, Architraves, and Friezes for cello solo

== Sources ==
- American Music Institute "Living Music" interview of George Balch Wilson (via Internet Archive Wayback Machine)
- George Balch Wilson, University of Michigan Faculty History Project
- Composition Alumni, 1960s, University of Michigan School of Music, Theatre & Dance
