= Marguerite Jeanne Carpentier =

French painter

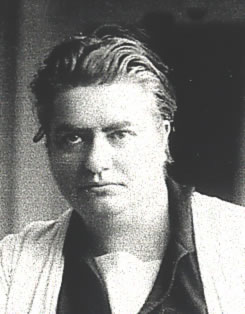
- Photograph of Marguerite Jeanne Carpentier
- Born: 8 September 1886; Paris, France
- Died: 7 November 1965 (aged 79); Paris, France
- Known for: Painting, Sculpture

Marguerite Jeanne Carpentier (8 September 1886 – 7 November 1965) was a French painter and sculptor. She was born and died in Paris.

She had an artistic independence. She studied in the École des Beaux Arts (1903–1909) and met Auguste Rodin. Her work was part of the painting event in the art competition at the 1924 Summer Olympics. She wrote a Journal d'artiste (a diary), from 1930 to her death in 1965.

Her mother Madeleine Carpentier was also a painter.

== Bibliography ==
- Marion Boyer, Une École de Femmes au XXe siècle, Éditions Un, Deux... Quatre, 1999
- Marion Boyer, Paris Trait pour Trait, Éditions Un, Deux... Quatre, 2001
- Marion Boyer (dir.): Marguerite Jeanne Carpentier « La Refusée ». Livret rédigé à l'occasion d'une exposition en 2016 (online version, pdf)
