= Théophile Marie Brébant =

French Army officer (1889–1965)

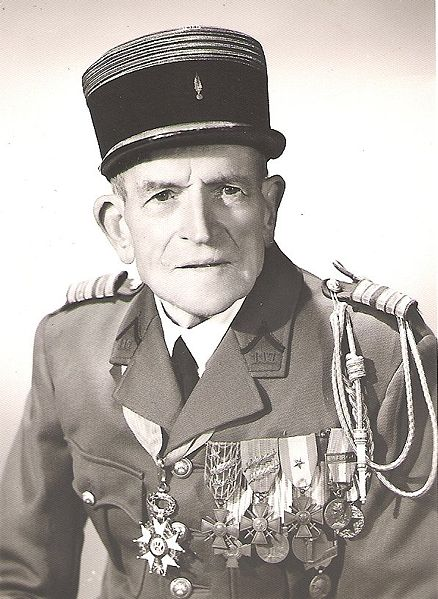
- Théophile Marie Brébant
- Born: 24 May 1889; Plésidy, France
- Died: 20 February 1965 (aged 75) Guingamp, France
- Allegiance: French Army
- Service years: 1908–1946
- Rank: Colonel
- Conflicts: World War I Rif War; World War II
- Awards: Commander of the Legion of Honor; Croix de Guerre 1914–1918; Croix de Guerre 1939–1945 croix de guerre des TOE; French Croix du combattant Colonial Medal staple with Morocco; Medal commemorating the war 1914–1918; World War I Victory Medal; Medal commemorating the war of 1939–1945 with staple France; Wounded military insignia Medal of La Marne; Medal of Verdun; Medal commemorating the Battle of the Somme (1940)

Théophile Marie Brébant (24 May 1889 – 20 February 1965) was a French Army officer during World War I and World War II. He ended his career in 1946 with the rank of colonel.

== Career ==
Brébant served from 23 July 1908 to 14 June 1946 in the French Army.

During his career he belonged to the following regiments:

- 48th line infantry regiment
- 1st Foreign Regiment
- 3rd Foreign Infantry Regiment
- 41st Infantry Regiment
- 146th Infantry Regiment fortress
- 117th Infantry Regiment

During World War I, Brébant participated in the First Battle of the Marne and the Battle of Verdun.

During the Second World War from 1939 to 1940, he participated in the Battle of France. Then he was a prisoner in Germany in Oflag IV-D (Hoyerswerda, Lower Silesia).

== Honour ==
A street of Guingamp (France) is now called "Col. Brébant" to honour him. It is planned to name a street where a green space in his name at Le Mans (France).

== Awards ==
- Commander of the Légion d'honneur on 17 January 1952
  - Officer of the Légion d'honneur on 13 December 1938
  - Knight of the Légion d'honneur on 24 July 1918
- French Croix de guerre 1914-1918 (1 bronze palm, 1 gilt star, 1 silver star, 1 bronze star)
- French Croix de guerre 1939-1945 (2 bronze palms)
- French Croix de guerre des TOE (1 silver star)
- French Croix du combattant
- Colonial Medal with bar "Morocco"
- Medal commemorating the war 1914–1918
- World War I Victory Medal
- Medal commemorating the war of 1939–1945 with staple France
- Wounded military insignia with two red stars (wounded twice)
- Medal of La Marne
- Medal of Verdun
- Medal commemorating the Battle of the Somme (1940)
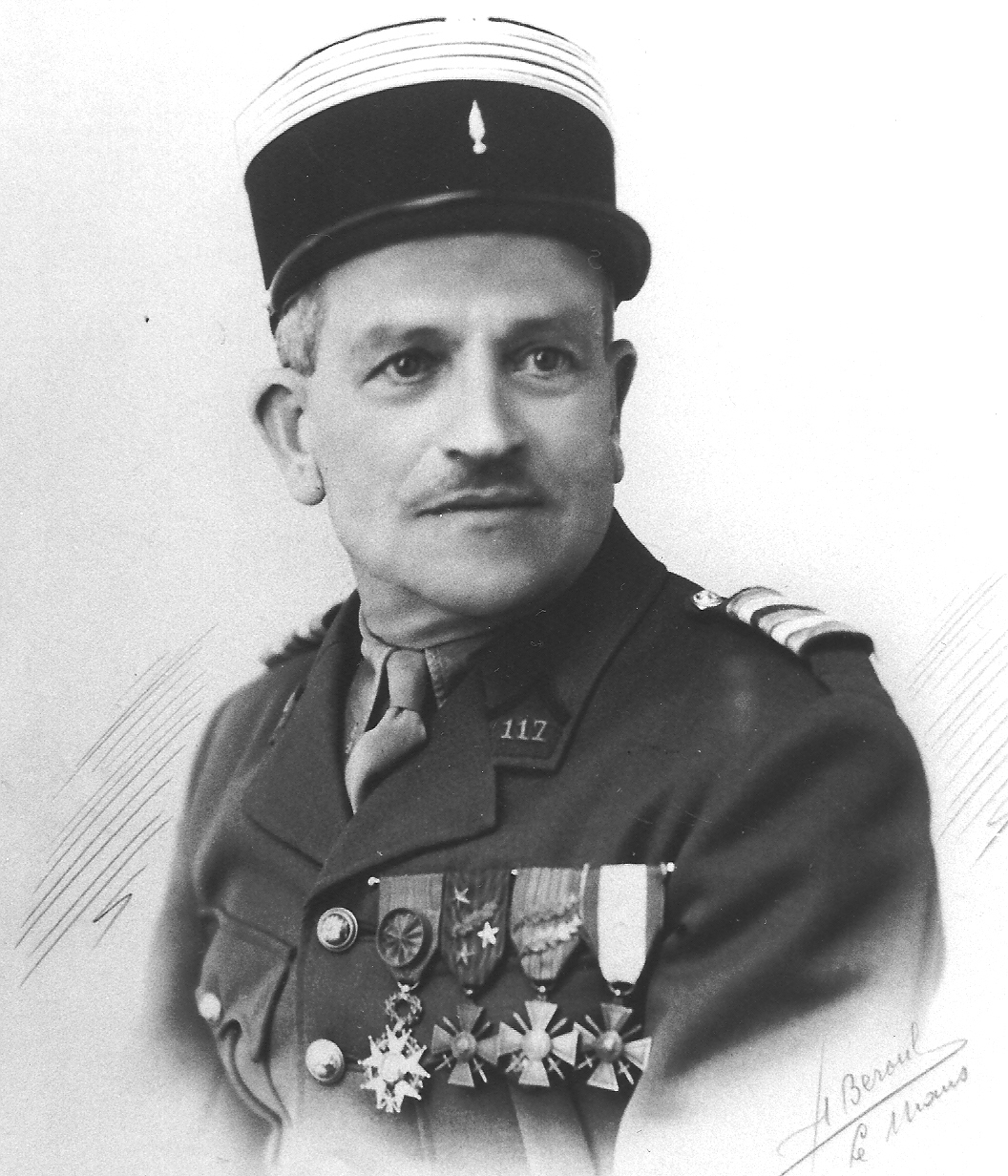
Colonel Brébant 1939, 117th Infantry Regiment at Le Mans.

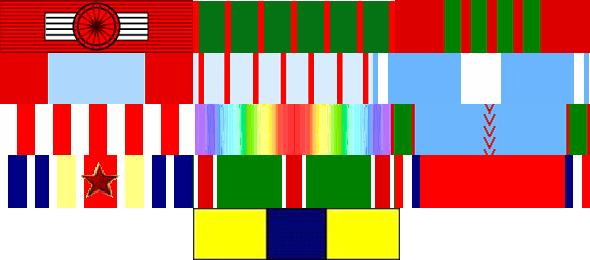
Medals of Colonel Brébant.

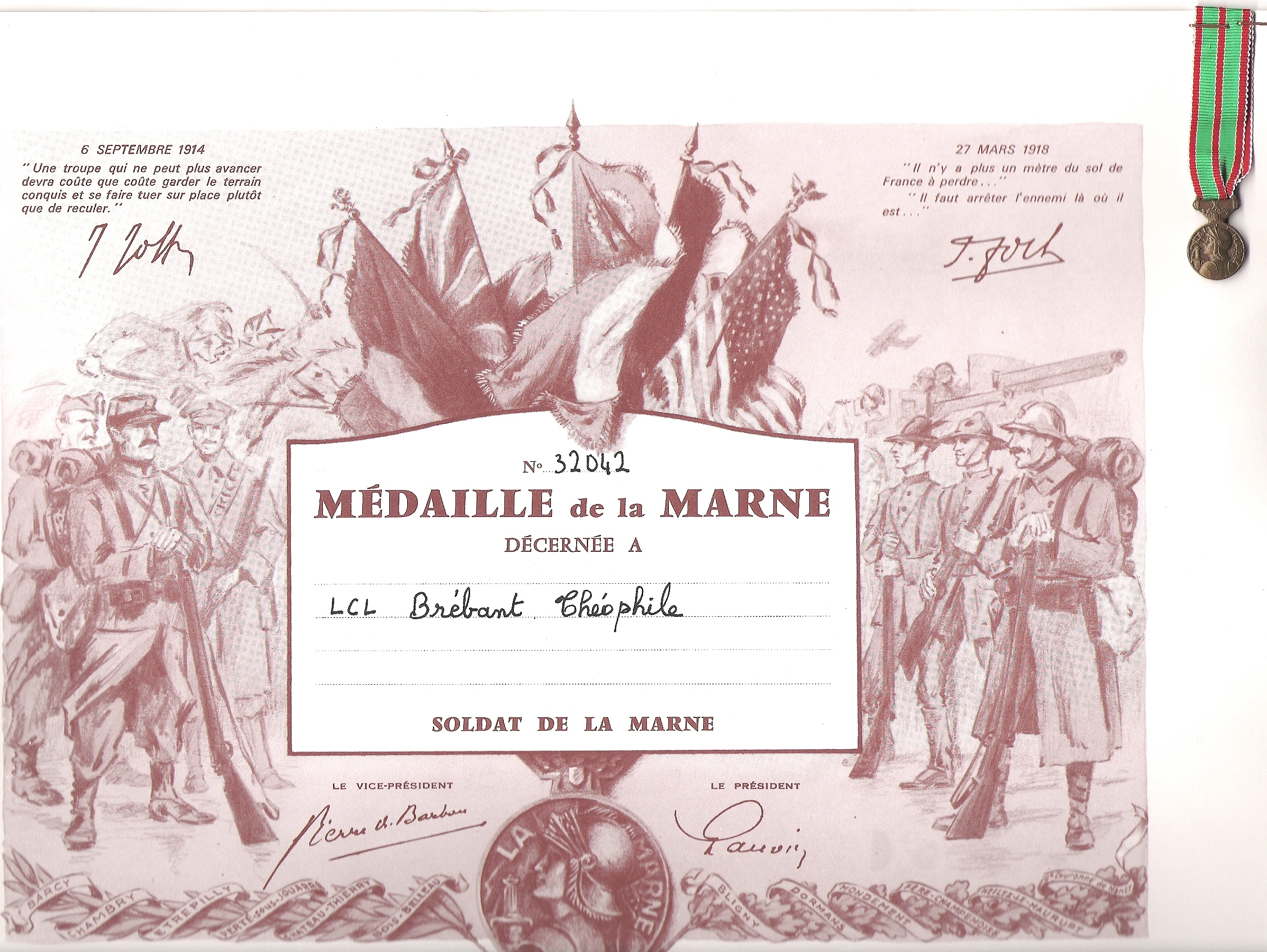
6 September 1914 Battle of the Marne. "A troop that can no longer move at all costs will keep the land conquered and killed on the spot rather than retreat." Signer General Foch.

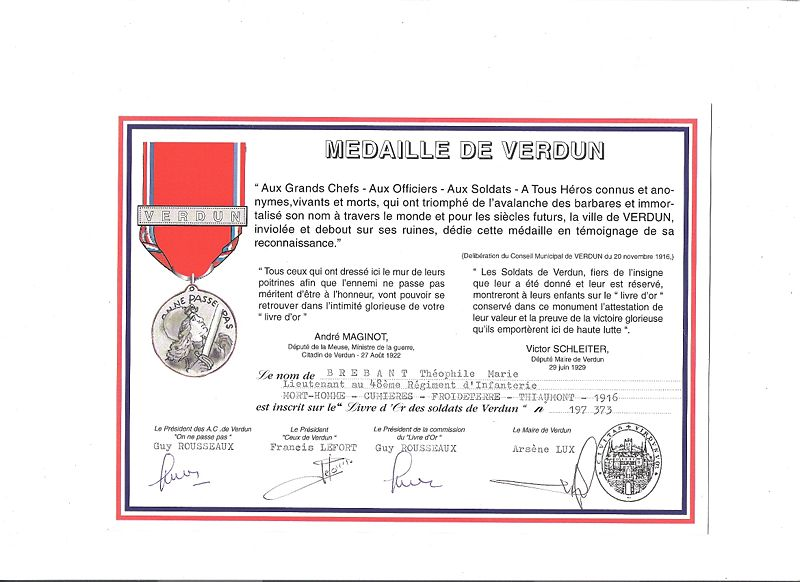
For chefs. Officers. Soldiers. "To all the heroes known and anonymous, living and dead, who have triumphed over the avalanche of barbaric and immortalized his name in the world and for future centuries, the city of Verdun, inviolable and stand on its ruins, dedicate this medal as a sign of his gratitude." Verdun, 20 November 1916.
