= Stéphane de Gérando =

French composer (born 1965)

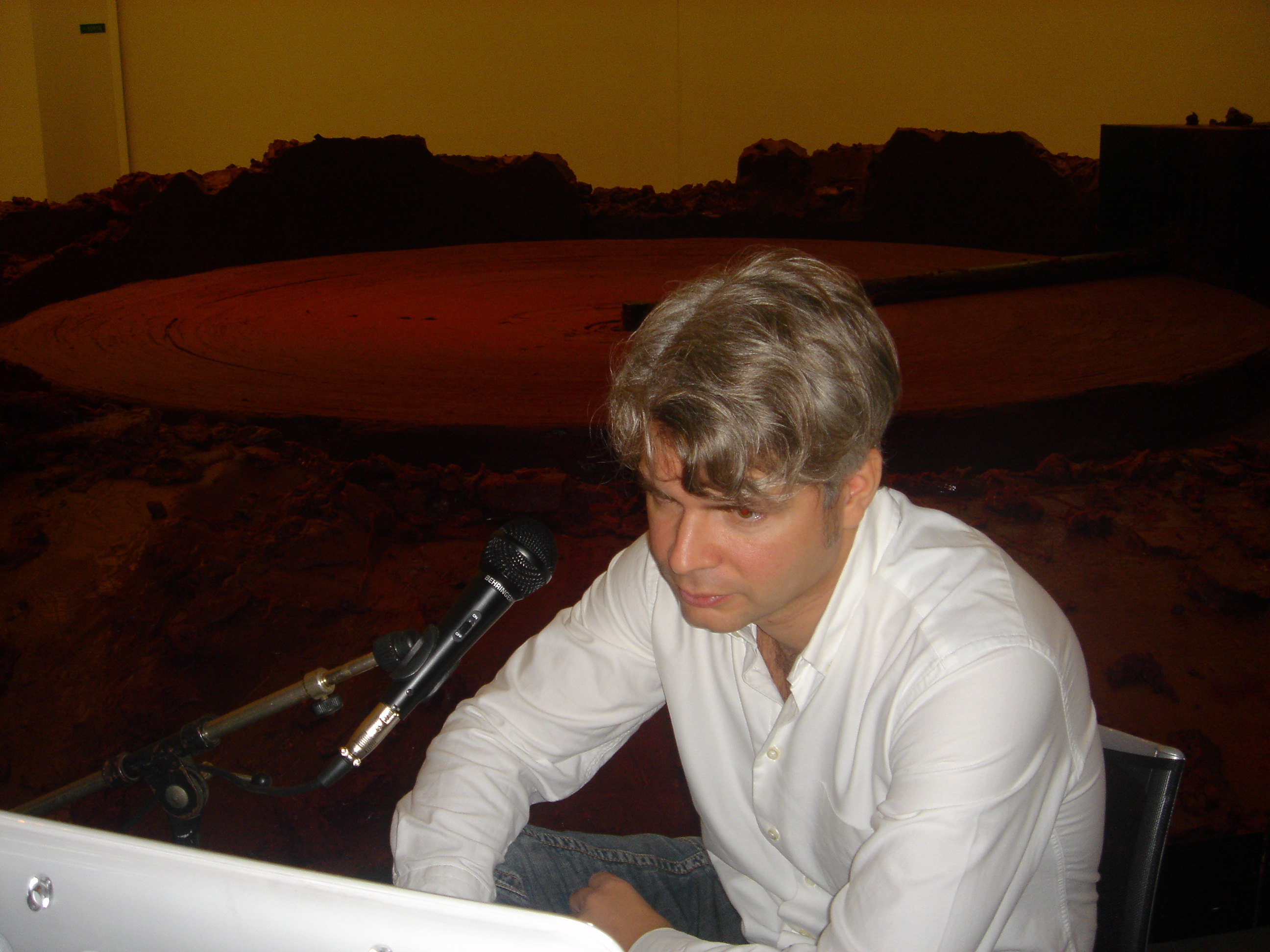
Gérando in 2007

Stéphane de Gérando (born June 23, 1965) is a French composer, conductor, multimedia artist, and researcher.

== Biography ==
Stéphane de Gérando was born in L'Haÿ-les-Roses in France into a family with historical ties to France and Hungary. He studied classical music from the age of 7 in France (conservatories of Saint-Brieuc, Rennes, Paris). At the Conservatoire national supérieur de musique de paris, he was the pupil of Alain Bancquart in composition, Michel Philippot in analysis, Gérard Grisey in orchestration, Guy Reibel and Laurent Cuniot in electroacoustics, Tristan Murail in computer music and Philippe Manoury (IRCAM). In the third cycle, he follows the master classes of Pierre Boulez, Karlheinz Stockhausen, Franco Donatoni, Emmanuel Nunes, Henri Dutilleux. In the field of research, his research dissertations are directed by Hugues Dufourt (DEA), Ivanka Stoïanova and Horacio Vaggione (PhD, Contingence et déterminisme procedural appliqués à la synthèse sonore informatique et l'écriture musicale (ISBN 2-284-00761-9), Pierre Abert Castanet (in French "Habitation à diriger les recherches", La création musicale en question, 2 volumes, 800 pages, published under the name of L'oeuvre musicale contemporaine à l'épreuve du concept, ISBN 978-2-296-56283-7).

Gérando was pedagogical director of a higher education centre (CEFEDEM Aquitaine became PESMD Bordeaux Nouvelle-Aquitaine) which prepares future territorial officials for the Diplôme d'Etat in France (2000–2005), president of the International Institute for Innovation, Artistic Creation and Research since 2006. He was also director of the training centre for intervening musicians (CFMI 2009–2011), arts department of the UFR of the University of Strasbourg. Since 1998, he has taught composition, real-time images and algorithmic sound creation (Paris).

== Music ==
His catalogue includes more than 90 works, from the instrument alone to the orchestra with or without electronics such as Puisque il est ainsi for symphony orchestra and magnetic tape, first performed by the Paris Conservatory Orchestra under the direction of Mark Foster at the Maison de la radio in Paris (1990); En toi avec lui et en lui, for four orchestral groups around the audience, creation at Radio-France's Studio 104 festival Présences 92, Du sens au sens pour flûte, created by Pierre-Yves Artaud at the Darmstadt International Festival (1994); Ce que tout cadavre devrait savoir for five instrumentalists, narrator and voice, premiered by the Ensemble 2e2m at the Centre Pompidou in Paris (1996); Intumescence for instrumental ensemble and band, premiered by the Orchestre philharmonique de Radio France at the Presences festival (1996); Katanga commissioned by Radio-France pour les cuivres et percussions de l'Orchestre Philharmonique (2004) work recorded under the direction of the composer, 6ex1pen7sion4, commission d'État pour ensemble et électronique en temps réel, first performed by l'Ensemble 2e2m in Paris (2006), or another more recent example, Lycromorphie, a violin, cello and piano trio created at Radio-France in Paris.

Gerando won the Stipendienpreis of Ferienkurse für Internationale Neue Musik Darmstadt 1994 (Germany), the Prize of the Association of Alumni and Students of the Conservatoires Nationaux Supérieurs de Musique et d'Art Dramatique de Paris (1991), the SACEM Academic Prize (1995), and was a laureate of the Sasakawa Foundation in 1993 and 1994.

== Polyartistic and technological creations ==
Since 2007, Gerando has mainly devoted himself to the Labyrinth of Time, a multi-support work at the same time polyartistic and technological, museum installations, digital art, video mapping, interactive visual and sound installations, sculptures with 3D projection, instrumental and vocal creations with real-time electronics, poetry-dance-theatre writing.

Among the last pieces belonging to the Labyrinth of Time are: The circle of the sphere for actor and video (2012); The strange passage of the senses for theatre, contemporary dance, percussions, video, virtual paintings, cello, horn, real-time electronics and electroacoustics (2015); Completion for instrumental ensemble with variable number, with body, text and musical score, real-time electronics, video and computer (2019); Vertical Memory electroacoustic cycle with the voices of Virginia Guidi, Nicholas Isherwood and Emmanuel Meyer (2022). With the support of France, one of the last monumental international screenings of the Labyrinth is on the Azadi Tower of Tehran, on July 19, 2018 .

== Research ==
Books, articles, dictionary, collaborations with scientists such as Franck Jedrzejewski, Athanase Papadopoulos, Christophe Mourougane (mathematicians), Jérôme Pétri (astrophysicist), Louis Bigo (computer scientist), Gille Baroin (engineering doctor), Gérando's research deals with theoretical and technological issues (world premieres – modulo 24 homometric sets, series all intervals in an octave and zigzag, series all intervals nested in a micro-intervallic series, model of spectral representation in four dimensions etc.) and on the other hand, historical, aesthetic, educational and institutional issues related to the notion of creation.

Gérando speaks publicly on other topics, such as ethical issues as on the occasion of Alain Bancquart's eightieth birthday at the Centre de la musique contemporaine (CDMC) in Paris on November 6, 2014, speech published on the front page of the newspaper Médiapart on November 8, 2014, or other example in 2016, in the context of relations between France and Morocco on «the art of entrepreneurship» at the Institut Français d'Agadir.

== Catalog of works (extracts) ==
Catalog of works – 3icar / icarEditions
Year	Title	Type of work	Duration
1989	Metathesis, for piano	solo	12:00
1990	Puisqu'il en est ainsi , for orchestra and tape	orchestra and electroacoustic	30:15
1991	Musique pour église, pécheur d'amour, le Christ et moi , sextet for flute in G, English horn, harp, vibraphone, sib clarinet, viola and imposed reverberation	7 instruments	12:00
1991	Hommage à Bach , sib clarinet	solo	00:59
1992	En toi, avec lui et en lui , 52 soloists and chamber auditorium (four orchestra groups scattered around the public)	orchestra	12:00
1993	Virtualité et conscience du vide , for strings	3 instruments	15:00
1994	Du sens au sens, for flute	solo	17:00
1996	Pièce pour cordes, for string orchestra	orchestra (strings)	10:00
1996	Ce que tout cadavre devrait savoir, for soprano, narrator, flute, clarinet, trumpet, cello, percussions and amplification system	7 instruments	15:00
1997	Intumescence, for orchestra and tape	orchestra and electroacoustic	15:00
1997	Intumescence, for tape	electroacoustic	07:00
1999	Binaurale, for tape	electroacoustic	10:00
2004	Katanga, 15 brass instruments and two percussions	18 instruments	15:00
2006	sixEXonePENsevenSIONfour, bass clarinet version	solo	07:00
2006	sixEXonePENsevenSIONfour – fragment 7 (rapid), percussion version	solo	07:00
2006	sixEXonePENsevenSIONfour, piccolo, double bass version	2 instruments	14:00
2006	sixEXonePENsevenSIONfour, piccolo, trumpet version	2 instruments	12:00
2006	sixEXonePENsevenSIONfour, piccolo, percussion version	2 instruments	09:00
2006	sixEXonePENsevenSIONfour, double bass, percussion version	2 instruments	09:00
2006	sixEXonePENsevenSIONfour , trumpet, percussion version	2 instruments	09:00
2006	sixEXonePENsevenSIONfour, fl. piccolo, percussion version	3 instruments	15:00
2006	sixEXonePENsevenSIONfour, fl. piccolo, trumpet double bass version	3 instruments and	15:00
2006	sixEXonePENsevenSIONfour – fragments 7, 4, Piccolo, trumpet, keyboard (with computer) version	3 instruments and electroacoustic	12:00
2006	sixEXonePENsevenSIONfour – fragments 6, 1, 7, bass clarinet, percussion, keyboard (with computer) version	3 instruments and electroacoustic	12:00
2006	sixEXonePENsevenSIONfour – fragments 6, 1, 7, 4, piccolo, clarinets (sib and bass), keyboard (computer) version	3 instruments and electroacoustic	15:00
2006	sixEXonePENsevenSIONfour – fragments 6, 1, 7, piccolo, trumpet, percussion (with computer) version	3 instruments and electroacoustic	12:00
2006	sixEXonePENsevenSIONfour, fl. piccolo, clarinet, double bass, percussion version	4 instruments	15:00
2006	sixEXonePENsevenSIONfour, flute, trumpet, double bass, percussions, keyboard (real time electronic possible)	5 instruments and electroacoustic	18:00
2007	sixEXonePENsevenSIONfour, piccolo version	solo	07:00
2007	sixEXonePENsevenSIONfour – fragment 1 (rapid), sib clarinet version	solo	03:00
2007	sixEXonePENsevenSIONfour – fragment 4 (rapid), bass clarinet version	solo	05:00
2007	sixEXonePENsevenSIONfour – fragment 7 (rapid), trumpet version	solo	07:00
2007	sixEXonePENsevenSIONfour, bass clarinet with real time electronics version	solo and electroacoustic	07:00
2007	sixEXonePENsevenSIONfour, piccolo with real time electronics version	solo and electroacoustic	07:00
2007	sixEXonePENsevenSIONfour, piccolo, keyboard (computer) version	2 instruments and electroacoustic	09:00 max.
2007	sixEXonePENsevenSIONfour, trumpet, keyboard (computer) version	2 instruments and electroacoustics	09:00 max.
2007	CA, Creative Algorithm, real time	video	indéterminée
2008	sixEXonePENsevenSIONfour, piccolo, bass clarinet version	2 instruments	12:00
2008	sixEXonePENsevenSIONfour, piccolo, bass real time electronic version	2 instruments and electroacoustic	15:00
2008	Virtualité et conscience du vide, violon version	solo	05:00
2008	Virtualité et conscience du vide, version cello (rapid)	solo	02:00
2008	L'opéra de glace, chorus of teenagers, tape and video	chorus, electroacoustic, video	02:00
2009	Intumescence,	video	08:00
2010	Blue bird, (first version 2007)	video	10:00
2010	Binaurale – fragment 1 – space points, real time video (first version 2007)	video	05:56
2010	Binaurale – fragment 2 – round space (first version 2007), real time video	video	06:15
2010...	The labyrinth of time, polyartistic and technological, real-time image and sound algorithmic creation	instruments, computers, theater, dance, music, video, installation, performance, mapping	indeterminate

== CD and DVD ==
- Verticale Mémoire (14 titles), cycle électroacoustique du Labyrinthe du temps, avec Virginia Guidi, Nicholas Isherwood, Emmanuel Meyer, ACEL, Centre National de la Musique, Maison de la Musique Contemporaine, Institut International pour l'Innovation, la Création Artistique et la Recherche, 2022 (La mique, Horizon chaotique, Day of dead, Fluid eternity, Issons des traces, Homometric attractor 2, Hyalite brun, Pistill recomposé, Trace en Ison, My name is, Fragments labyrinthiques, Théâtre du labyrinthe, Macrobiotique point zéro, Algorithmique Grand Cycle)
- Electroacoustic 1 (7 titles), UPC EAN 198003576506, 2022 (Stellar Wave, Homometric Attractor 1, Boréal cendré, Le chant du labyrinthe, Le porte dell'inferno, Intumespeed, Atomic Space)
- Meta-instrument 1 (13 titles), UPC EAN 198003568464, 2022 (Sollar Wave, Le chant des Stismi, Bruissement cosmique, Cathédrale des temps, Introït, Planète flottante, Intumescence, Ison, Pusle, Spiralis, Tempus Est, Titan)
- Dialogues Imaginaires (7 titles) Tschan – Inactuelles, (Katanga, 15 cuivres et deux percussions, ensemble de l'orchestre philharmonique de Radio-France, direction Stéphane de Gérando, 6ex1pen7sion4 IV, clarinette basse et électronique temps réel, Aurélien Cescousse clarinette, 6ex1pen7sion4 II, flûte piccolo et électronique temps réel, Gilles Burgos flûte, Intumescence, 15 instruments et bande, Orchestre Philharmonique de Radio-France, direction Tsung Yeh, Virtualité et conscience du vide, Trio à cordes, Sona Kochafian, Pascal Robault, Pierre Strauss, Binaurale, étude électronique, 6ex1pen7sion4 III, flûte clarinette et ordinateur, Aurélien Cescousse clarinette, Gilles Burgos flûte, icarStudio, Du sens au sens, pour flûte, Pierre-Yves Artaud flûte)
- L'opéra de glace, DVD, Bordeaux Aquitaine, direction Stéphane de Gérando, 3icar icarEdition
- En toi avec lui et en lui, Journées de la composition, Conservatoire National Supérieur de Paris, 1995

== Books ==
- L'œuvre contemporaine à l'épreuve du concept, préface de Paul Méfano, postface de Jean-Yves Bosseur, Paris, L'Harmattan, 2012, 227 p.
- Imaginary dialogues. Experiencing contemporary creation and research, Paris, Inactuelles, 2010, 300 p. – version anglaise Julien Elis. CD with Radio-France, MFA, 3icar – icarEnsemble, Inactuelles, 2010.
- Dialogues imaginaires. Une expérience de la création contemporaine et de la recherche, Paris, Inactuelles, 2010, 300 p. Ouvrage accompagné d'un disque monographique, en collaboration avec Radio-France, MFA, 3icar – icarEnsemble, Inactuelles, 2010.
- Trajectoire oblique, 3icar icarEditions, 2006, 150 p.
- Contingence et déterminisme procédural appliqués à la synthèse sonore informatique et l'écriture musicale, Villeneuve d'Ascq, Septentrion – Presses Universitaires, 1998, 470 p.

== Articles ==
- Gilles Baroin, Stéphane de Gérando, When Virtual Reality Helps Fathom Mathemusical Hyperdimensional Models, International Conference on Mathematics and Computation in Music MCM 2022: Mathematics and Computation in Music, Springer 2022, pp 86–98
- De la création artistique aux espace entrepreneuriaux : plébiscite pour un nouveau monde, publication d'une allocution de Stéphane de Gérando à l'Institut Français d'Agadir au Maroc, Paris, 3icar /icarEditions, 2016, 13 p.
- Invention algorithmique du matériau : séries tous intervalles dans une octave et en zizag (STIOZ), séries tous intervalles imbriqués dans une série micro-intervallique (STISMI), avec Louis Bigo, Paris, 3icar /icarEditions, 2016
- Espace fibré et composition sonore et visuelle. De l’élément simple aux dimensions cachées et enchevêtrées, avec Christophe Mourougane (mathématicien, chercheur à l’institut de recherche mathématique de Rennes), Paris, 3icar /icarEditions, 2015, 13 p.
- Cinq lois artistiques relativistes. Du concept d'espace-temps en astrophysique à l'invention sonore et visuelle, avec Jérôme Pétri (Observatoire Astronomique de Strasbourg), Paris, 3icar /icarEditions, 2015, 17 p.
- Géométrie Euclidienne et création artistique sonore et visuelle, avec Athanase Papadopoulos (CNRS), Paris, 3icar /icarEditions, 2015, 11 p.
- Nouvelles pratiques polyartistique et technologiques. Règles d’interprétation du théâtre et de la danse du Labyrinthe du temps, Paris, 3icar /icarEditions, 2015, 21 p.
- Géométrie Euclidienne et création artistique sonore et visuelle, avec Athanase Papadopoulos (CNRS), Paris, 3icar /icarEditions, 2015, 11 p.
- Ensembles homométriques et création sonore et visuelle contemporaine, avec Franck Jedrzejewski (CEA), Paris, 3icar /icarEdtions, 2014, 12 p.
- Alain Bancquart ou l'œuvre comme expression éthique et politique, Paris, 2014. Allocution publiée par Médiapart le 8 novembre 2014 et prononcée par Stéphane le 6 novembre 2014 à l’occasion du quatre-vingtième anniversaire d’Alain Bancquart à l’invitation du Centre de documentation de la musique contemporaine à Paris.
- Douze enjeux pour la création artistique au XXIe siècle. Ce que les sciences pourraient apporter à l'imaginaire, Paris, 3icar /icarEditions, 2014, 5 p.
- Composer ? Paris, 3icar /icarEditions, 2014, 8 p.
- Introduction au Labyrinthe du temps, Paris, 3icar /icarEditions, 2013, 18 p.
- L’acte de créer ou retarder la mort. D’après un entretien avec Alain Bancquart, Education musicale n°576, Vernon, L’Education Musicale, 2012, 7 p.
- Stéphane de Gérando/ Gilles Baroin, Sons et représentation visuelle en hyperespace : l’hypersphère des spectres, Les Cahiers de l’Institut International pour l’Innovation, la Création Artistique et la Recherche, Paris, 3icar /icarEditions, 2012, 15 p.
- Presence and absence of creation, The 3icar journal, Paris, 3icar /icarEditions, 2012, 18 p.
- Stéphane de Gérando – IDEAT CNRS / Athanase Papadopoulos – IRMA CNRS UDS, Introduction à l’art topologique. Concepts mathématiques et création musicale ou poly-art, Les Cahiers de l’Institut International pour l’Innovation, la Création Artistique et la Recherche, Paris, 3icar /icarEditions, 2011, 13 p.
- CA – Creative Algorithm – œuvre virtuelle interactive temps réel, Bordeaux, 3icar IcarÉditions, 2007 – 2e édition 2010, 10 p.
- Non répétition et œuvre musicale contemporaine. À partir de l’œuvre pour piano d’Arnold Schoenberg, Vernon, Education musicale n°507/508, 2006, 10 p.
- La notion d’apogée dans Lemme-Icône-Epigramme de Brian Ferneyhough, L’apogée – Cahiers du Laboratoire Pluridisciplinaire de Recherches sur l’Imaginaire appliquées à la Littérature (L.A.P.R.I.L.), Bordeaux, Eidôlon, 2005, 18 p.
- Création musicale, recherche, nouvelles technologies numériques et institution, Les cahiers d’ARTES, Bordeaux, CAPCB, 2005, 8 p.
- La notion de frontière dans l'œuvre musicale après 1945 : réalité ou utopie? – Exemples d' Ikhoor de Iannis Xenakis, d' Anahit de Giacinto Scelsi et de 4'33’’ de John Cage, Frontières et seuils – Cahiers du Laboratoire Pluridisciplinaire de Recherches sur l’Imaginaire appliquées à la Littérature (L.A.P.R.I.L.), Bordeaux, Eidôlon, 2004, 15 p.
- À propos de l’œuvre pour bande seule et de l’écriture musicale de Jean-Claude Risset (1), Education musicale n°507/508, Vernon, L’Education Musicale, 2003, 4 p.
- À propos de l’œuvre pour bande seule et de l’écriture musicale de Jean-Claude Risset (2), Education musicale n°509/510, Vernon, L’Education Musicale, 2004, 4 p.
- Virtualité du son et écriture musicale : pour une création algorithmique du timbre, Analyse Musicale n°48, Paris, ADAM, 2003, 15 p.
- Modèles de synthèse sonore informatique – Présentation des techniques de synthèse numérique et introduction à une esthétique du timbre synthétique, Analyse Musicale n°47, Paris, ADAM, 2003, 13 p.
- Présence du répertoire populaire dans la musique occidentale savante – Points de repère concernant la période contemporaine, Education musicale n°499, Education musicale, Vernon, L’Éducation Musicale, 2003, 6 p.
- Quatre variations sur une mort annoncée – Penser l'existence de l'opéra contemporain après 1978, Analyse musicale n°46, Paris, ADAM, 2003, 10 p.
- Se séparer pour découvrir un imaginaire – L’expérience d’une écriture musicale, Imaginaire et inconscient n°8, revue d’études psychothérapeutiques, Bègles, L’Esprit du Temps – Presses Universitaires de France, 2002, 6 p.
- Dictionnaire de la Musique et de la Danse, Paris, Larousse – Bordas, 1999, 10 p.

== Conferences (extracts) ==
- Conference Le Labyrinthe du temps ou la force du questionnement, Saturday 4 June 2022, Paris, "Contemporary Spring Festival"
- International conferences, The labyrinth of time in Tehran, University of Tehran, technological workshops, Iran Music Museum in Tehran, invitation from the Embassy of France in Iran, from 15 to 17 July 2018.
- Ariane 1 International Colloquium, Education, Creation and Digital, on 7, 8, 9 October 2015, day of 8 October 2015 on the theme "New technologies and contemporary music: what changes for what new artistic practices?". Automatic score tracking and cycle 6 of the Labyrinth of Time, international symposium on digital Ariane 1, conference with José Echeveste – Collège de France/IRCAM, October 8, 2015.
- Alain Bancquart Colloquium, Conference on November 6, 2014, at the CDMC in Paris, L'enseignement d'Alain Bancquart ou l'œuvre comme expression éthique et politique (an allocation published on the front page of Médiapart).
- IRCAM Conference The Hypersphere of Spectra, with the engineer Gilles Baroin (University of Toulouse), MaMuX seminar (mathematics and music) of IRCAM, May 4, 2012,
- Symposium on Mathematics and Music, Music and Topology of Space, Institut de Recherche Mathématique Avancée, Université de Strasbourg CNRS, 2 October 2010.
- The notion of apogee in Brian Ferneyhough’s Lemme-Icône-Epigramme, Colloque international: l'Apogée, LAboratoire Pluridisciplinaire de Recherches sur l'Imaginaire Littéraire- Université Bordeaux III, 4 5 and 6 March 2004.
- The notion of frontier in musical work after 1945: reality or utopia? Ikhoor de Iannis Xenakis, d'Anahit de Giacinto Scelsi et de 4’33” by John Cage, International Colloquium on Borders and Thresholds organized by the Multidisciplinary Research Institute on Literary Imagination- University Bordeaux III, 27 (28 and 29) March 2003.
- Musical creation, research, new digital technologies and institution, ARTES Symposium University Bordeaux III on The 1970s, Musée d'Art Contemporain de Bordeaux (CAPC), January 2003.
- Musical creation, coherence and new technologies, Colloquium of the International College of Philosophy, New technologies, International College of Philosophy, Paris 5th, May 11, 1998.
- Synthèse sonore informatique et écriture musicale, IRCAM – Conference realized in collaboration with Laurent Pottier, Espace de Projection de l'RCAM, January 1993 – IRCAM recording
