= Pascal Despeyroux =

French footballer (born 1965)

Personal information
- Date of birth: 17 June 1965 (age 61)
- Place of birth: Toulouse, France
- Position: Midfielder

Senior career*
Years	Team	Apps	(Gls)
1985–1992	Toulouse FC		
1992–1996	AS Saint-Étienne		
1996–1997	Perpignan FC		

International career
1988	France	3	(0)
- * Club domestic league appearances and goals

Pascal Despeyroux (born 17 June 1965) is a retired professional French footballer who played midfielder.
