= Pierre-Yves Artaud =

French composer and music educator

Pierre-Yves Artaud (born 13 July 1946) in Paris, is a French classical flautist.
