= List of compositions by Morton Feldman =

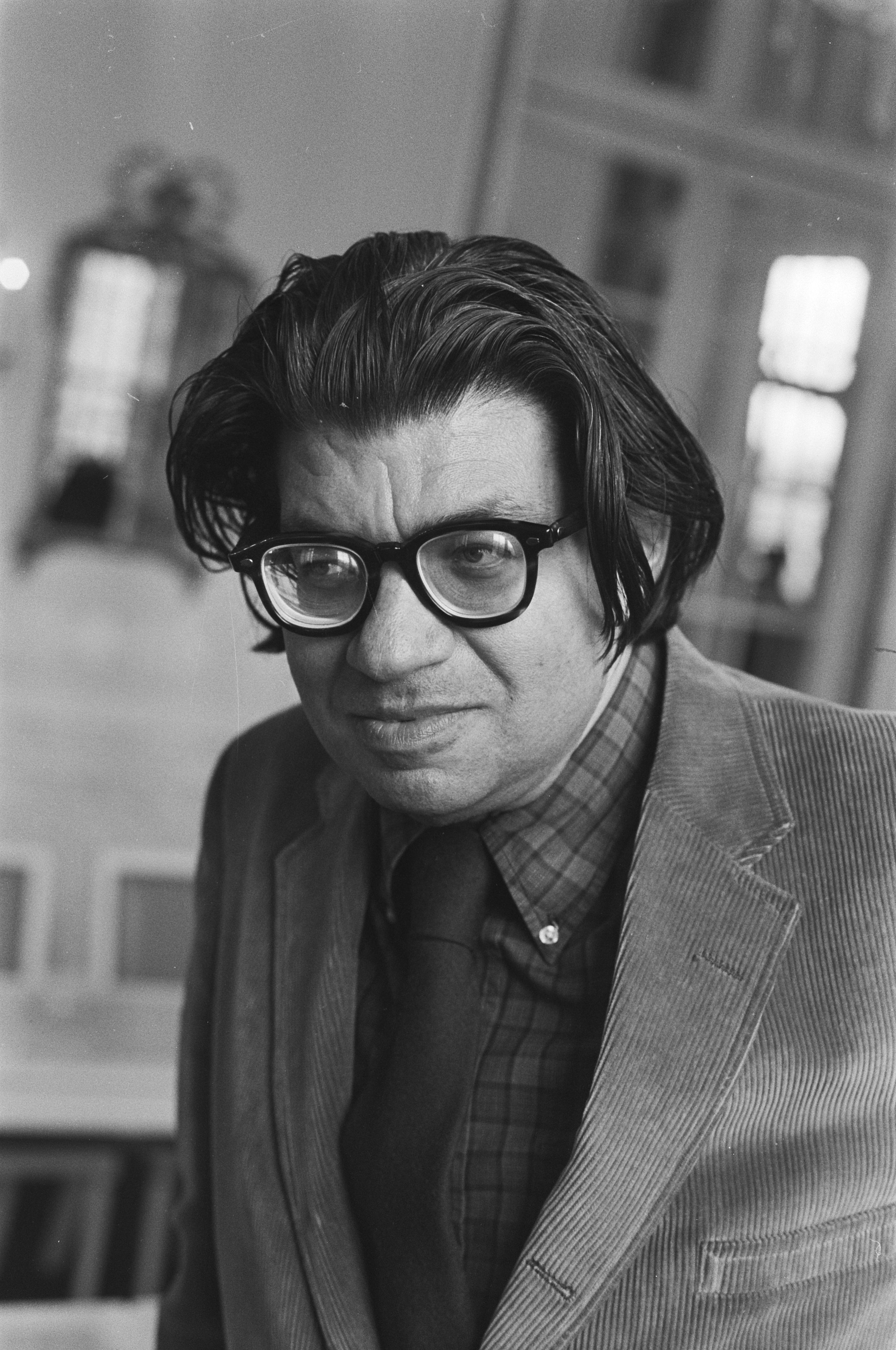
Morton Feldman in Amsterdam, 1976

This article presents a complete list of compositions by American composer Morton Feldman, organized by instrumentation. There are about 184 compositions in total. Within each category, the works are arranged chronologically by year of composition. Note that works for piano solo (or, for example, cello solo) are in the solo instrumental category, though works for 2 or more pianos (2 or more cellos, etc.) are in the chamber category.

Many pieces by Feldman are titled after the instruments used: for example, Two Pieces for Clarinet and String Quartet is scored precisely for clarinet and string quartet. In cases like this, instrumentation is not given separately. Works with titles in square brackets are unpublished works, left untitled by the composer; these are commonly referred to using the generic title "Composition" (with the exception of a few early works).

== Orchestral ==
- Dirge: In Memory of Thomas Wolfe (194?)
- Jubilee (1943)
- Night, for string orchestra (1943)
- [Composition], for string orchestra (1945)
- Episode (1949)
- Intersection 1, for large orchestra (1951)
- Marginal Intersection, for large orchestra (with subsonic and ultrasonic oscillators/tape or phonograph record) (1951)
- Out of 'Last Pieces' (1961)
- Structures for Orchestra (1962)
- In Search of an Orchestration (1967)
- On Time and the Instrumental Factor (1969)
- String Quartet and Orchestra (1973)
- Orchestra (1976)
- The Turfan Fragments (1980)
- Coptic Light (1985)

=== For solo instrument and orchestra ===
- The Viola in My Life IV, for viola and orchestra (1971)
- Cello and Orchestra (1972)
- Piano and Orchestra (1975)
- Oboe and Orchestra (1976)
- Flute and Orchestra (1978)
- Violin and Orchestra (1979)

=== Vocal ===
- Chorus and Orchestra 1, for soprano, choir, and orchestra (1971)
- Chorus and Orchestra 2 (1972)
- Voice and Instruments, for soprano and orchestra (1972)
- Elemental Procedures, for soprano, choir, and orchestra (1976)

== Stage works ==
- Ixion (ballet), for chamber ensemble (1958; second version for two pianos, 1960)
- Neither (Opera in One Act), for soprano and orchestra (1977)
- Samuel Beckett, Words and Music, for 2 flutes, vibraphone, piano, violin, viola, and cello (1987)

== Chamber ==
- [Composition], for horn, celesta and string quartet (19??)
- [Sonata], for violin and piano (1945)
- [Sonatina], for cello and piano (1946)
- Two Pieces, for cello and piano (1948)
- [Composition], for cello and 2 pianos (1950)
- Piece for Violin and Piano (1950)
- Projection 2, for flute, trumpet, piano, violin and cello (1951)
- Projection 3, for 2 pianos (1951)
- Projection 4, for violin and piano (1951)
- Projection 5, for 3 flutes, trumpet, 2 pianos and 3 cellos (1951)
- Structures, for string quartet (1951)
- [Composition], for cello and piano (1951)
- Music for the Film "Jackson Pollock", for 2 cellos (1951)
- Extensions 1, for violin and piano (1951)
- Extensions 4, for 3 pianos (1953)
- Extensions 5, for 2 cellos (1953)
- Intermission 6, for 1 or 2 pianos (1953)
- Eleven Instruments, for chamber ensemble (1953)
- Music for the Film "Sculpture by Lipton" (1954)
- [Composition], for flute, bass clarinet, bassoon, horn, trumpet, piano and cello (1954)
- Two Pieces for Two Pianos (1954)
- Three Pieces for String Quartet (1956)
- Two Pieces for Six Instruments, for flute, alto flute, horn, trumpet, violin and cello (1956)
- Piece for Four Pianos (1957)
- Two Pianos (1957)
- Work for Two Pianists, for 2 pianos (1958)
- Two Instruments, for horn and cello (1958)
- Atlantis, for chamber ensemble (1959)
- Arrangement of Tu Pauperum Refugium by Josquin des Prez, for chamber ensemble (1960)
- Something Wild in the City: Mary Ann's Theme, for horn, celesta and string quartet (1960)
- Montage 2 on the Theme of "Something Wild", for jazz ensemble (1960)
- Montage 3 on the Theme of "Something Wild", for jazz ensemble (1960)
- Untitled Film Music, for flute, horn, trumpet, trombone, tuba, percussion, and double bass (1960)
- The Sin of Jesus (Score for Untitled Film), for flute, horn, trumpet, and cello (1960)
- Durations 1, for alto flute, piano, violin, and cello (1960)
- Durations 2, for cello and piano (1960)
- Piece for Seven Instruments, for flute, alto flute, trumpet, horn, trombone, violin, and cello (1960)
- Durations 3, for violin, tuba, and piano (1961)
- Durations 4, for vibraphone, violin, and cello (1961)
- Two Pieces for Clarinet and String Quartet (1961)
- Durations 5, for horn, vibraphone, harp, piano or celesta, violin, and cello (1961)
- The Straits of Magellan, flute, horn, trumpet, harp, electric guitar, piano, and double bass (1961)
- Merce, for percussion and piano or celesta (1963)
- [Composition], for percussion and celesta (1963)
- De Kooning, for horn, percussion, piano, violin, and cello (1963)
- Vertical Thoughts 1, for 2 pianos (1963)
- Vertical Thoughts 2, for violin and piano (1963)
- Numbers, for chamber ensemble (1964)
- Four Instruments, for chimes, piano, violin and cello (1965)
- Two Pieces for Three Pianos (1966)
- First Principles, for chamber ensemble (1967)
- False Relationships and the Extended Ending, for trombone, 3 pianos, chimes, violin and cello (1968)
- Samoa, for flute, horn, trumpet, trombone, harp, vibraphone, piano, and cello (1968)
- Between Categories, for 2 pianos, 2 chimes, 2 violins, and 2 cellos (1969)
- Madame Press Died Last Week at Ninety, for chamber ensemble (1970)
- The Viola in My Life 1, for viola, flute, percussion, piano, violin, and cello (1970)
- The Viola in My Life 2, for viola, flute, clarinet, percussion, celesta, violin, and cello (1970)
- The Viola in My Life 3, for viola and piano (1970)
- Three Clarinets, Cello and Piano (1971)
- Five Pianos (1972)
- Trio for Flutes, for three flutes (1972)
- Half a Minute It's All I've Time For, for clarinet, trombone, piano, and cello (1972)
- For Stockhausen, Cage, Stravinsky and Mary Sprinson, for cello and piano (1972)
- For Frank O'Hara, for flute, clarinet, percussion, piano, violin, and cello (1973)
- Instruments 1, for alto flute, oboe, trombone, percussion, and celesta (1974)
- Instruments 2, for chamber ensemble (1975)
- Four Instruments, for piano, violin, viola, and cello (1975)
- Routine Investigations, for oboe, trumpet, piano, viola, cello, and double-bass (1976)
- Instruments 3, for flute, oboe, and percussion (1977)
- Spring of Chosroes, for violin and piano (1977)
- Why Patterns?, for flute, percussion and piano (1978)
- String Quartet (1979)
- Trio, for violin, cello, and piano (1980)
- Patterns in a Chromatic Field/Untitled Composition For Cello And Piano, for cello and piano (1981)
- Bass Clarinet and Percussion, for bass clarinet and two percussionists (playing cymbals, gongs, timpani, marimba, xylophones, and vibraphones) (1981)
- For John Cage, for violin and piano (1982)
- Crippled Symmetry, for flute, percussion and piano (1983)
- String Quartet II (1983)
- Clarinet and String Quartet (1983)
- For Philip Guston, for flute, percussion, and piano/celesta (1984)
- Violin and String Quartet (1985)
- Piano and String Quartet (1985)
- For Christian Wolff, for flute and piano/celesta (1986)
- Samuel Beckett, Words and Music, for 2 flutes, vibraphone, piano, violin, viola, and cello (1987)
- For Samuel Beckett, for 23 instruments (1987)
- Piano, Violin, Viola, Cello (1987)

=== Chamber & vocals ===
- I Loved You Once, for voice and string quartet (194?)
- Journey to the End of the Night, for soprano, flute, clarinet, bass clarinet, and bassoon (1947)
- Lost Love, for voice and piano (1949)
- Four Songs to e. e. cummings, for soprano, piano, and cello (1951)
- Three Ghostlike Songs and Interlude, for voice, trombone, piano, and viola (1951)
- Wind, for voice and piano (1950)
- The Swallows of Salangan, for choir and chamber ensemble (1960)
- Intervals, for bass-baritone, trombone, percussion, vibraphone, and cello (1961)
- Followe Thy Faire Sunne, for voice and tubular bells (1962)
- For Franz Kline, for soprano, horn, chimes, piano, violin, and cello (1962)
- The O'Hara Songs, for bass-baritone, chimes, piano, violin, viola, and cello (1962)
- Vertical Thoughts 3, for soprano and chamber ensemble (1963)
- Vertical Thoughts 5, for soprano, tuba, percussion, celesta, and violin (1963)
- Rabbi Akiba, for soprano and chamber ensemble (1963)
- Chorus and Instruments, for choir and chamber ensemble (1963)
- Chorus and Instruments II, for choir, tuba and chimes (1967)
- [Composition], for voice, clarinet, cello and double bass (1970)
- Rothko Chapel, for soprano, alto, choir, percussion, celesta and viola (1971)
- I Met Heine on the Rue Fürstenberg, for female voice and chamber ensemble (1971)
- Pianos and Voices, for 5 sopranos and 5 pianos (1972)
- Voices and Instruments, for chamber ensemble and chorus (1972)
- Voices and Instruments 2, for 3 voices, flute, 2 cellos and double bass (1972)
- Voices and Cello, for 2 female voices and cello (1973)
- Voice and Instruments 2, for female voice, clarinet, cello and double bass (1974)
- Voice, Violin and Piano, for female voice, violin, and piano (1976)
- Arrangement of Weill/Brecht Alabama Song, for bass, voice ad lib, 2 saxophones, trumpet, trombone, marimba, and piano (1984)
- For Stefan Wolpe, for choir and 2 vibraphones (1986)

== Solo instrumental ==
=== Piano ===
- [Composition] (194?)
- First Piano Sonata [(To Bela Bartok)] (1943)
- Preludio (1944)
- Self Portrait (1945)
- Illusions (1948)
- For Cynthia (195?)
- Three Dances (1950)
- Two Intermissions (1950)
- Nature Pieces (1951)
- Intermission 3 (1951)
- Variations (1951)
- Intersection 2 (1951)
- Intermission 4 (1952)
- Intermission 5 (1952)
- Extensions 3 (1952)
- Piano Piece 1952 (1952)
- Intersection + (1953)
- Intersection 3 (1953)
- Intermission 6 (1953; for one or two pianos)
- Three Pieces for Piano (1954)
- Piano Piece 1955 (1955)
- Piano Piece 1956 A (1956)
- Piano Piece 1956 B (1956)
- Piano Three Hands (1957)
- Piano Four Hands (1958)
- Last Pieces (1959)
- Piano Piece (to Philip Guston) (1963)
- Vertical Thoughts 4 (1963)
- Piano Piece 1964 (1964)
- Piano (1977)
- Triadic Memories (1981)
- For Bunita Marcus (1985)
- Palais de Mari (1986)

=== Other instruments ===
- Projection 1, for cello (1950)
- Intersection 4, for cello (1953)
- The King of Denmark, for percussion (1964)
- The Possibility of a New Work for Electric Guitar (1966) (original score lost, broadcast recording found)
- Principal Sound, for organ (1980), commissioned by the Hartt School of Music for the 1981 International Contemporary Organ Music Festival.
- For Aaron Copland, for violin (1981)
- [Composition], for violin (1984)
- A Very Short Trumpet Piece, for trumpet (1986)

=== Solo vocal pieces ===
- Only, for solo voice (1947)
- Christian Wolff in Cambridge, for chorus a cappella (1963)
- Three Voices, for soprano (two pre-recorded parts and one live), or 3 sopranos (1982)

== Chronological order ==
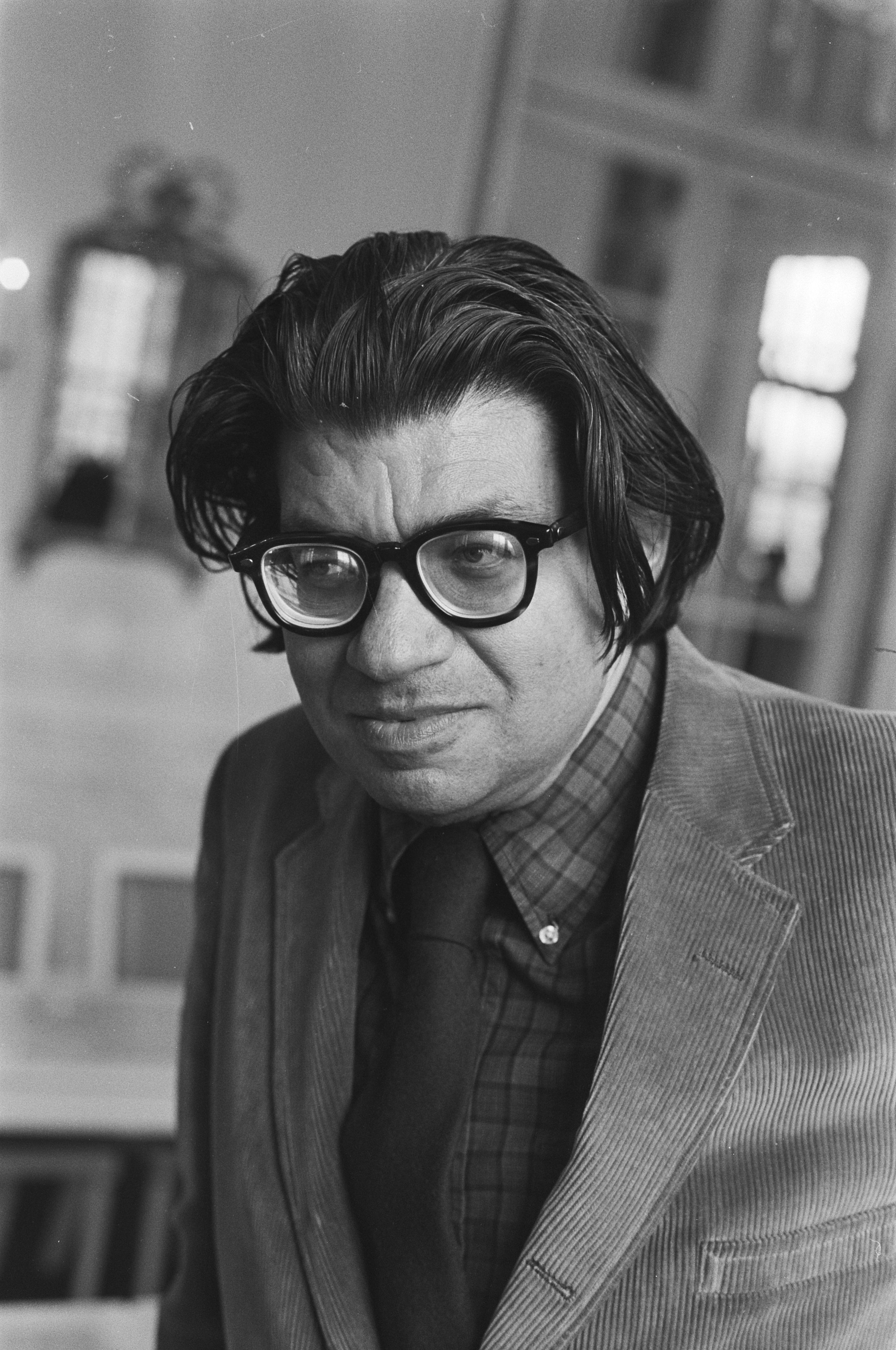
Morton Feldman in Amsterdam, 1976

This article presents a complete list of compositions by American composer Morton Feldman, in chronological order.

=== 19??-1949 ===
- [Composition], for horn, celesta and string quartet (19??)
- [Composition], for piano (194?)
- I Loved You Once, for voice and string quartet (194?)
- Dirge: In Memory of Thomas Wolfe (194?)
- First Piano Sonata [(To Bela Bartok)] (1943)
- Jubilee (1943)
- Night, for string orchestra (1943)
- Preludio, for piano (1944)
- [Composition], for string orchestra (1945)
- [Sonata], for violin and piano (1945)
- Self Portrait, for piano (1945)
- [Sonatina], for cello and piano (1946)
- Journey to the End of the Night, for soprano, flute, clarinet, bass clarinet, and bassoon (1947)
- Only, for solo voice (1947)
- Two Pieces, for cello and piano (1948)
- Illusions, for piano (1948)
- Episode (1949)
- Lost Love, for voice and piano (1949)

=== 1950-1959 ===
- For Cynthia, for piano (195?)
- Three Dances, for piano (1950)
- Two Intermissions, for piano (1950)
- Wind, for voice and piano (1950)
- [Composition], for cello and 2 pianos (1950)
- Piece for Violin and Piano (1950)
- Projection 1, for cello (1950)
- Nature Pieces, for piano (1951)
- Intermission 3, for piano (1951)
- Variations, for piano (1951)
- Intersection 2 (1951)
- Four Songs to e. e. cummings, for soprano, piano, and cello (1951)
- Three Ghostlike Songs and Interlude, for voice, trombone, piano, and viola (1951)
- Projection 2, for flute, trumpet, piano, violin and cello (1951)
- Projection 3, for 2 pianos (1951)
- Projection 4, for violin and piano (1951)
- Projection 5, for 3 flutes, trumpet, 2 pianos and 3 cellos (1951)
- Structures, for string quartet (1951)
- [Composition], for cello and piano (1951)
- Music for the Film "Jackson Pollock", for 2 cellos (1951)
- Extensions 1, for violin and piano (1951)
- Intersection 1, for large orchestra (1951)
- Marginal Intersection, for large orchestra (with oscillator/tape) (1951)
- Extensions 3, for piano (1952)
- Piano Piece 1952 (1952)
- Intermission 4, for piano (1952)
- Intermission 5, for piano (1952)
- Intersection 4, for cello (1953)
- Intersection +, for piano (1953)
- Intersection 3, for piano (1953)
- Intermission 6, for one or two pianos (1953)
- Extensions 4, for 3 pianos (1953)
- Extensions 5, for 2 cellos (1953)
- Intermission 6, for 1 or 2 pianos (1953)
- Eleven Instruments, for chamber ensemble (1953)
- Intersection for Magnetic Tape, for 8-track tape (1953) (Not to be confused with 8-track cartridge tape.)
- N.B. Marginal Intersection (listed under Orchestra, above) has electronic elements; two oscillators (presumably sine-wave) and a recording of riveting from a construction site (presumably from a sound-effects LP record). The Intersection For Magnetic Tape and Marginal Intersection are the only works by Feldman to contain electronic elements.
- Three Pieces for Piano (1954)
- Music for the Film "Sculpture by Lipton" (1954)
- [Composition], for flute, bass clarinet, bassoon, horn, trumpet, piano and cello (1954)
- Two Pieces for Two Pianos (1954)
- Piano Piece 1955 (1955)
- Piano Piece 1956 A (1956)
- Piano Piece 1956 B (1956)
- Three Pieces for String Quartet (1956)
- Two Pieces for Six Instruments, for flute, alto flute, horn, trumpet, violin and cello (1956)
- Piece for 4 Pianos (1957)
- Two Pianos (1957)
- Piano Three Hands (1957)
- Work for Two Pianists, for 2 pianos (1958)
- Two Instruments, for horn and cello (1958)
- Piano Four Hands (1958)
- Atlantis, for chamber ensemble (1959)
- Last Pieces, for piano (1959)
- Ixion (ballet), for chamber ensemble (1958; second version for two pianos, 1960)

=== 1960-1969 ===
- Arrangement of Tu Pauperum Refugium by Josquin des Prez, for chamber ensemble (1960)
- Something Wild in the City: Mary Ann's Theme, for horn, celesta and string quartet (1960)
- Montage 2 on the Theme of "Something Wild", for jazz ensemble (1960)
- Montage 3 on the Theme of "Something Wild", for jazz ensemble (1960)
- Untitled Film Music, for flute, horn, trumpet, trombone, tuba, percussion, and double bass (1960)
- The Sin of Jesus (Score for Untitled Film), for flute, horn, trumpet, and cello (1960)
- Durations 1, for alto flute, piano, violin, and cello (1960)
- Durations 2, for cello and piano (1960)
- Piece for Seven Instruments, for flute, alto flute, trumpet, horn, trombone, violin, and cello (1960)
- The Swallows of Salangan, for choir and chamber ensemble (1960)
- Out of 'Last Pieces' (1961)
- Durations 3, for violin, tuba, and piano (1961)
- Durations 4, for vibraphone, violin, and cello (1961)
- Two Pieces for Clarinet and String Quartet (1961)
- Durations 5, for horn, vibraphone, harp, piano or celesta, violin, and cello (1961)
- The Straits of Magellan, flute, horn, trumpet, harp, electric guitar, piano, and double bass (1961)
- Intervals, for bass-baritone, trombone, percussion, vibraphone, and cello (1961)
- Followe Thy Faire Sunne, for voice and tubular bells (1962)
- For Franz Kline, for soprano, horn, chimes, piano, violin, and cello (1962)
- The O'Hara Songs, for bass-baritone, chimes, piano, violin, viola, and cello (1962)
- Structures for Orchestra (1962)
- Merce, for percussion and piano or celesta (1963)
- [Composition], for percussion and celesta (1963)
- De Kooning, for horn, percussion, piano, violin, and cello (1963)
- Vertical Thoughts 1, for 2 pianos (1963)
- Vertical Thoughts 2, for violin and piano (1963)
- Vertical Thoughts 3, for soprano and chamber ensemble (1963)
- Vertical Thoughts 5, for soprano, tuba, percussion, celesta, and violin (1963)
- Rabbi Akiba, for soprano and chamber ensemble (1963)
- Chorus and Instruments, for choir and chamber ensemble (1963)
- Piano Piece (to Philip Guston) (1963)
- Vertical Thoughts 4, for piano (1963)
- Christian Wolff in Cambridge, for chorus a cappella (1963)
- Piano Piece 1964 (1964)
- Numbers, for chamber ensemble (1964)
- The King of Denmark, for percussion (1964)
- Four Instruments, for chimes, piano, violin and cello (1965)
- Two Pieces for Three Pianos (1966)
- The Possibility of a New Work for Electric Guitar (1966) (original score lost, broadcast recording found)
- In Search of an Orchestration (1967)
- First Principles, for chamber ensemble (1967)
- Chorus and Instruments II, for choir, tuba and chimes (1967)
- False Relationships and the Extended Ending, for trombone, 3 pianos, chimes, violin and cello (1968)
- Samoa, for flute, horn, trumpet, trombone, harp, vibraphone, piano, and cello (1968)
- On Time and the Instrumental Factor (1969)
- Between Categories, for 2 pianos, 2 chimes, 2 violins, and 2 cellos (1969)

=== 1970-1979 ===
- Madame Press Died Last Week at Ninety, for chamber ensemble (1970)
- The Viola in My Life 1, for viola, flute, percussion, piano, violin, and cello (1970)
- The Viola in My Life 2, for viola, flute, clarinet, percussion, celesta, violin, and cello (1970)
- The Viola in My Life 3, for viola and piano (1970)
- [Composition], for voice, clarinet, cello and double bass (1970)
- Three Clarinets, Cello and Piano (1971)
- The Viola in My Life IV, for viola and orchestra (1971)
- Chorus and Orchestra 1, for soprano, choir, and orchestra (1971)
- Rothko Chapel, for soprano, alto, choir, percussion, celesta and viola (1971)
- I Met Heine on the Rue Fürstenberg, for female voice and chamber ensemble (1971)
- Pianos and Voices, for 5 sopranos and 5 pianos (1972)
- Voices and Instruments, for chamber ensemble and chorus (1972)
- Voices and Instruments 2, for 3 voices, flute, 2 cellos and double bass (1972)
- Cello and Orchestra (1972)
- Chorus and Orchestra 2 (1972)
- Voice and Instruments, for soprano and orchestra (1972)
- Five Pianos (1972)
- Trio for Flutes, for three flutes (1972)
- Half a Minute It's All I've Time For, for clarinet, trombone, piano, and cello (1972)
- For Stockhausen, Cage, Stravinsky and Mary Sprinson, for cello and piano (1972)
- String Quartet and Orchestra (1973)
- For Frank O'Hara, for flute, clarinet, percussion, piano, violin, and cello (1973)
- Voices and Cello, for 2 female voices and cello (1973)
- Voice and Instruments 2, for female voice, clarinet, cello and double bass (1974)
- Instruments 1, for alto flute, oboe, trombone, percussion, and celesta (1974)
- Piano and Orchestra (1975)
- Instruments 2, for chamber ensemble (1975)
- Four Instruments, for piano, violin, viola, and cello (1975)
- Oboe and Orchestra (1976)
- Orchestra (1976)
- Elemental Procedures, for soprano, choir, and orchestra (1976)
- Routine Investigations, for oboe, trumpet, piano, viola, cello, and double-bass (1976)
- Voice, Violin and Piano, for female voice, violin, and piano (1976)
- Instruments 3, for flute (doubling piccolo and alto flute), oboe (doubling English horn), and percussion (1977)
- Spring of Chosroes, for violin and piano (1977)
- Neither (Opera in One Act), for soprano and orchestra (1977)
- Piano (1977)
- Flute and Orchestra (1978)
- Why Patterns?, for flute, percussion and piano (1978)
- Violin and Orchestra (1979)
- String Quartet (1979)

=== 1980-1987 ===
- The Turfan Fragments (1980)
- Trio, for violin, cello, and piano (1980)
- Principal Sound, for organ (1980)
- For Aaron Copland, for violin (1981)
- Patterns in a Chromatic Field/Untitled Composition For Cello And Piano, for cello and piano (1981)
- Bass Clarinet and Percussion, for bass clarinet and two percussionists (playing cymbals, gongs, timpani, marimba, xylophones, and vibraphones) (1981)
- Triadic Memories, for piano (1981)
- For John Cage, for violin and piano (1982)
- Three Voices, for soprano (two pre-recorded parts and one live), or 3 sopranos (1982)
- Crippled Symmetry, for flute, percussion and piano (1983)
- String Quartet II (1983)
- Clarinet and String Quartet (1983)
- For Philip Guston, for flute, percussion, and piano/celesta (1984)
- Arrangement of Weill/Brecht Alabama Song, for bass, voice ad lib, 2 saxophones, trumpet, trombone, marimba, and piano (1984)
- [Composition], for violin (1984)
- Violin and String Quartet (1985)
- Piano and String Quartet (1985)
- Coptic Light (1985)
- For Bunita Marcus, for piano (1985)
- For Christian Wolff, for flute and piano/celesta (1986)
- For Stefan Wolpe, for choir and 2 vibraphones (1986)
- Palais de Mari, for piano (1986)
- A Very Short Trumpet Piece, for trumpet (1986)
- Samuel Beckett, Words and Music, for 2 flutes, vibraphone, piano, violin, viola, and cello (1987)
- For Samuel Beckett, for 23 instruments (1987)
- Piano, Violin, Viola, Cello (1987)

== Electronic ==
- Intersection for Magnetic Tape, for 8-track tape (1953) (Not to be confused with 8-track cartridge tape.)
- N.B. Marginal Intersection (listed under Orchestra, above) has electronic elements; two oscillators (presumably sine-wave, one ultrasonic, one subsonic) and a recording of riveting from a construction site (presumably from a sound-effects LP record; listed in the score as "Record"). The Intersection For Magnetic Tape and Marginal Intersection are the only works by Feldman to contain electronic elements.
