= Eather =

Eather may refer to:

- Alice Eather (1988/89–2017), Australian poet
- Edgar Eather (1886–1968), Justice of the Supreme Court of Nevada
- Kenneth Eather (1901–1993), Australian Army officer who served during the Second World War
- Michael Eather (born 1963), contemporary Australian artist
- Stephen Eather (born 1961), Australian rules footballer
- Mount Eather, mountain in Antarctica

== See also ==
- Ether
- Aether (disambiguation)
- Either (disambiguation)
