= Ore (disambiguation) =

An ore is a rock that contains minerals.

Ore or ORE may also refer to:

== Arts and entertainment ==
- Alien: Ore, 2019 short film part of Alien (franchise)
- Le Ore, an Italian magazine
- One-Roll Engine, a role-playing game system
- Ordo Rosarius Equilibrio, a Swedish music group

== Places ==
=== Nigeria ===
- Ore, Nigeria, a town in Ondo State

=== Norway ===
- Ore, Farsund, a village in Vest-Agder county
- Øre, Norway, a village and former municipality in Møre og Romsdal county
- Øre (lake), a lake in Åseral municipality, Vest-Agder county

=== United Kingdom ===
- Ore, East Sussex, a district in Hastings, East Sussex, England
- River Ore, a river in Suffolk, England
- River Ore, Fife, a river in Fife, Scotland
- Ore, Fife, a district near Kirkcaldy, Scotland

=== United States ===
- Oregon, a western state abbreviated Ore.

=== Elsewhere ===
- Ore, Haute-Garonne, a French commune

== Other uses ==
- Öre, a Swedish coin and currency unit
- Øre, a Danish/Norwegian coin and currency unit
- Ore (pronoun) (俺), a Japanese form of me
- Operation Ore, a British police operation targeting child pornography
- Object Reuse and Exchange, an Internet standard
- Orange Municipal Airport, by FAA LID airport code
- Orthographic Reform of English (OR-E), an English-language spelling reform
- Open Research Europe, open access publishing platform

== People with the surname, Ore ==
- Henrik Øre (born 1979), former Danish cricketer
- Øystein Ore, Norwegian mathematician
- Rebecca Ore, American science fiction writer
- Antonio Oré, Peruvian basketball player
- Claudia María Hernández Oré, Peruvian TV host, model and beauty pageant titleholder
- Fortuné Oré, Beninese footballer
- José Enrique Jerí Oré, Peruvian politician and lawyer
- Juan José Oré, Peruvian football manager and player
- Luis Jerónimo de Oré, Peruvian Franciscan priest

== People with the given name, Ore ==
- Ore Oduba, (born 1986), British journalist

== See also ==
- Oare (disambiguation)
- Or (disambiguation)
- Oar (disambiguation)
