= Neither =

Neither is an English pronoun, adverb, and determiner signifying the absence of a choice in an either/or situation. Neither may also refer to:

- Neither (opera), the only opera by Morton Feldman
- "neither" (short story), a very short story by Samuel Beckett
