= Piece for Four Pianos =

Composition by Morton Feldman

- by Morton Feldman
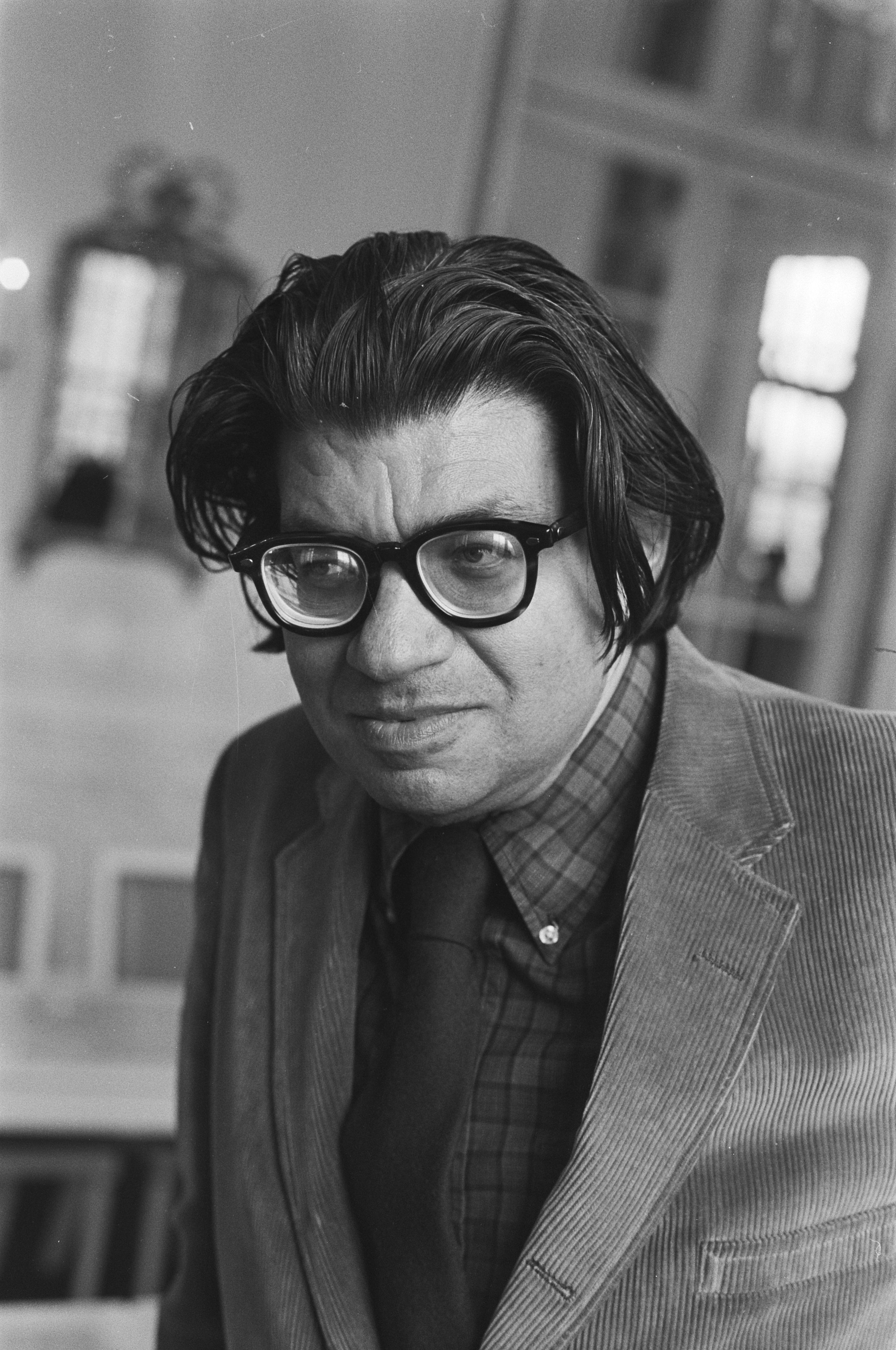
- Morton Feldman
- Composed: April 30, 1957
- Performed: 1957, New York City
- Published: 1962:
- Scoring: Four pianos

Piece for Four Pianos is a musical composition for four pianos by American composer Morton Feldman. It was finished in 1957.

== Background ==
Feldman's Piece for Four Pianos was first conceived as a result of the composer's fascination with the timbral and spatial possibilities of the piano, which he explored in many other compositions for two to five pianos in his lifetime, such as Extensions IV, Two Pieces, and Five Pianos. It was Feldman's first free durational composition with fixed pitches, as he grew more and more frustrated with the use of regular pulses and rhythmic placement. A somewhat early chamber composition, Piece for Four Pianos was written on April 30, 1957. It was premiered shortly after by John Cage, William Masselos, Grete Sultan and David Tudor, in the Carl Fischer Concert Hall, 165 West 57th Street, New York City. It was then published by C. F. Peters in 1962.

== Structure ==
Piece for Four Pianos is a single-movement composition scored for four pianos reading the same sheet of music. Its duration may vary widely, since Feldman specifies in the score that all beats are meant to be played slowly but not necessarily simultaneously—that is, each performer has its own internal speed, which may be different from the rest. However, most performances tend to be about 7 to 8 minutes long. As other early works by Feldman, this piece is meant to have an echo-like or reverberant quality. Feldman attempted to remove what he believe to be a supposed virtue of traditional ensemble playing, stating that "It works better if [the players] don't listen [to each other]." He then stated that the result should be "like a series of reverberations from an identical sound source" and that "the beginning of the piece is like a recognition, not a motif, and by virtue of the repetitions it conditions one to listen."

The original score is one page, five systems long written in notation. Feldman only uses seventy-five musical events, including chords, single notes, and rests, arrayed in an arbitrary fashion. The piece requires all pianists to start simultaneously, all playing the same chord while slowly drifting apart in tempo. Notes are generally stemless, although stems can be found in some passages and grace notes, and some eighth notes with empty heads are present. There is no measure division, time signature, key signature, and tempo markings. Feldman provides no indications as to how the notes written in the score can be read, which gives performers some space for artistic freedom. Even though there are no explicit dynamic markings present in the score, Feldman specifies that the piece has to be played with low dynamics with a minimum of attack. Despite the fact that the piece has no measures, players are expected to count beats, as fermatas, grace notes and silent beats are present and common in the piece.

== Reception ==
In January 1960, music critic Alfred Frankenstein wrote on High Fidelity magazine that "although [Feldman denied] that his Piece for Four Pianos has anything to do with Webern's pointillism, the effect of [Feldman's] works is eminently Webernian" and "the final result is to compact hours into seconds with an almost overwhelming intensity and depth of feeling". English composer Cornelius Cardew, who would later work with Feldman and premiere some of his works, also wrote that "possibly because it has been played so much, this piece has acquired a venerable quality; the notes themselves have an air of immutability, as though they were pre-determined in some non-human sphere, possibly by the instruments for which they were written." Maurice Hinson wrote that "it is possible that Feldman's work was designed to reattract audiences largely put off by an extreme mathematical approach to music", and the piece contains "delicate textures and sonorities".

The sounds follow one another in a slow, elastic chain. There are no loud sounds. All pianists have the same sequence of sounds to play, but in playing them they drift apart, each taking his own time, so that the reverberations of the same sound amongst the four pianos are often widely separated in time. But by sometimes having the same sound repeated several times by each pianist individually, Feldman manages to create areas, like plains, where the four pianos come together again, or are at least able to locate each other in the distance.

— Cornelius Cardew.

== Recordings ==
The piece remains a popular experiment for chamber pianists to this day. Here is a list of recordings of Piece for Four Pianos:

- The world premiere recording of this piece was first performed by David Tudor, Edwin Hymovitz, Russell Sherman and Feldman himself. It was released on LP shortly after it was composed, in 1959, by Columbia Masterworks. It was later reissued by Samson and Odyssey Records in 1968. It was ultimately re-released on compact disc by Edition RZ in February 2007.
- A recording by the Ensemble Musicamorfosi was released in 2003 by Auditorium Edizioni. This release was restricted to Italy.
- Jeroen van Veen recorded a 25-minute solo version of the piece. As well as van Veen, pianists Elizabeth Bergmann, Marcel Bergmann, and Sandra van Veen were credited to have taken part in the performance. The performance was released in a compact disc box set by Brilliant Classics in 2010.
- Helena Bugallo recorded the piece with Amy Williams, Amy Briggs, and Benjamin Engeli between December 19 and 23, 2008. The recording was released in 2009 on compact disc by WERGO.
