= Or =

Or or OR may refer to:

== Arts and entertainment ==
=== Film and television ===
- "O.R.", a 1974 episode of M*A*S*H
- Or (My Treasure), a 2004 film

=== Music ===
- Or (album), a 2002 album by Golden Boy with Miss Kittin
- *O*R, the original title of Olivia Rodrigo's album Sour, 2021
- "Or", a song by Israeli singer Chen Aharoni in Kdam Eurovision 2011
- Or Records, a record label
- Organized Rhyme, a Canadian hip-hop group featuring Tom Green

== Businesses and organizations ==
- Or (political party) (lit. 'light'), Israel
- OR Books, an American publisher
- Owasco River Railway, Auburn, New York, U.S. (by reporting mark)
- TUI fly Netherlands, formerly Arke, a Dutch charter airline (by IATA designator)

== Language and linguistics ==
- Or (digraph), in the Uzbek alphabet
- Or (letter) (or forfeda), in Ogham, the Celtic tree alphabet
- Odia language, a language spoken in East India (ISO 639)
- Or, an English grammatical conjunction
- -or, an English agent noun suffix
- Or, a digraph in Taiwanese's Daī-ghî tōng-iōng pīng-im phonetic transcription

== Places ==
=== Europe ===
- Or (Crimea), an isthmus of the Black Sea
- Or (river), a tributary of the Ural
- Province of Oristano, Italy (by vehicle code)

=== United States ===
- Oregon state postal abbreviation
- Orange Line (Washington Metro)

=== India ===
- Odisha, formerly Orissa, a state of India

== Science, technology, and mathematics ==
=== Computing and mathematics ===
- Or (logic), logical disjunction
- Exclusive or (XOR), a logical operation
- Bitwise OR, an operator in computer programming, typically notated as or or |
- The short-circuit operator or, notated or, ||, or or else
- Elvis operator, an operator in computer programming that returns its first operand if its value is considered true, and its right operand if not
- Null coalescing operator, an operator in computer programming
- Onion routing, anonymous networking technique (also Onion Router)
- OR gate, an integrated circuit in electronics
- Object–relational mapping

=== Other uses in science and technology ===
- Odds ratio, a measure of effect size in statistics
- OR, a previous title of the Journal of the Operational Research Society
- Operating room, in medicine
- Operations research, or operational research, in British English
- Operations readiness

== Titles and ranks ==
- Official receiver, a statutory office holder in England and Wales
- Order of Roraima of Guyana, an award of the Republic of Guyana
- Other ranks, personnel who are not commissioned officers, usually including non-commissioned officers (NCOs), in militaries of many Commonwealth countries

== Other uses ==
- Or (name), a list of people with the Hebrew given name and surname
- Official Records of the American Civil War
- Olympic record, a term for the best performances in Olympic Games
- Or (heraldry), a gold or yellow tincture (from the French word for "gold")
- Own recognizance, the basis for releasing someone awaiting trial without bail

== See also ==
- '0r' (zero r), meaning "no roods", in old measurements of land area
- And (disambiguation)
- Oar (disambiguation)
- Ore (disambiguation)
- Orr (disambiguation)
- Either/Or (disambiguation)
