= Joan La Barbara =

American vocalist and composer (born 1947)

- Also known as: Joan La Barbara
- Born: Joan Linda Lotz; June 8, 1947 (age 79); Philadelphia, Pennsylvania, U.S.
- Genres: Avant-garde, Classical, Vocal
- Occupations: Vocalist, composer, actress, educator
- Instruments: Vocals, electronics
- Years active: 1971–present
- Labels: Wizard, Chiaroscuro, Nonesuch, New Albion, Lovely Music, Mode, New World
- Website: joanlabarbara.com

Joan Linda Lotz La Barbara (born June 8, 1947) is an American vocalist and composer known for her explorations of non-conventional or "extended" vocal techniques. Considered to be a vocal virtuoso in the field of contemporary music, she is credited with advancing a new vocabulary of vocal sounds including trills, whispers, cries, sighs, inhaled tones, and multiphonics (singing two or more pitches simultaneously).

== Biography ==
An influential figure in experimental music, La Barbara was born in Philadelphia, Pennsylvania. She is a classically trained singer who studied with soprano Helen Boatwright at Syracuse University, Phyllis Curtin at Tanglewood/Berkshire Music School and contralto Marion Szekeley Freschl at the Juilliard School in New York.

Joan La Barbara's early creative work (early to mid 1970s) focuses on experimentation and investigation of vocal sound as raw sonic material, including works that explore varied timbres on a single pitch,"circular singing" inhaled and exhaled singing inspired by horn players' circular breathing techniques, and multiphonic or chordal singing [i.e. double-stops for the voice]. In the mid 1970s, she began creating more structured compositional works, some of which include electronics and layered voice sounds.

She has accumulated a large repertoire of vocal works by 20th-and 21st-century music masters, including many pieces composed especially for her voice. She has performed and recorded works by composers including John Cage, Robert Ashley, Morton Feldman, Philip Glass, Larry Austin, Peter Gordon, Alvin Lucier, and her husband Morton Subotnick, and has collaborated with choreographers Merce Cunningham, Jane Comfort, Nai-Ni Chen and poet Kenneth Goldsmith.

In 2004, she was awarded a Guggenheim Fellowship in Music Composition. She also received a Foundation for Contemporary Arts John Cage Award (2016).

La Barbara is a guest instructor at HB Studio.

== Other work ==
Joan La Barbara has also done work acting and composing for television, film, and dance. She composed and performed the music for the Sesame Street animated segment Signing Alphabet, for electronics and voice, and has composed a variety of chamber, orchestral, and choral works. She also appears in Matthew Barney’s 2014 film River of Fundament. La Barbara is currently on the music composition artist faculty at New York University Steinhardt School of Culture, Education, and Human Development, Department of Music and Performing Arts Professions, and on the faculty of Mannes/The New School/College of Performing Arts.

La Barbara was a staff music critic for the SoHo Weekly News from March 1974 until autumn 1975, taking off about five months in 1974 to go on tour with Philip Glass. She covered jazz and experimental music, concentrating on less-known artists, writing weekly columns that were a mix of previews of new artists and reviews of performances.

== Discography ==
=== La Barbara works ===
- Voice Is the Original Instrument (2016). Arc Light Editions, vinyl release, ALE005.
- io: atmos (2009) New World Records, CD 80665
- Voice Is the Original Instrument: Early Works (2003). Lovely Music, CD 3003.
- Awakenings, for chamber ensemble (1994) Music & Arts, CD 830
- Shamansong (1998) New World Records, CD 8054
- 73 Poems (1994) book and CD with Kenneth Goldsmith, Lovely Music, Ltd., CD 3002
- "Computer Music Series, Vol.13, The Virtuoso in the Computer Age III", l'albero dalle foglie azzurre (tree of blue leaves), for solo oboe and computer music on tape (1993) Centaur Records, CRC 2166
- Sound Paintings (1991) Lovely Music, Ltd., CD 3001
- Silent Scroll on Newband Plays Microtonal Works, (1990) Mode Records, #18
- The Art of Joan La Barbara (1985) Nonesuch, LP 78029-1
- As Lightning Comes, In Flashes (1983) Wizard Records, LP RVW 2283
- The Reluctant Gypsy (1980) Wizard Records, RVW 2279
- Tapesongs (1978) Chiaroscuro, LP CR-196
- Voice Is the Original Instrument: Early Works (1976) Wizard Records, LP 2266

=== Featured on works by other composers ===
- Johann Johannsson Arrival (Original Soundtrack) (2016) Deutsche Grammophon, CD
- Robert Ashley Now Eleanor's Idea (2007) Lovely Music, Ltd., CD 1009
- Robert Ashley Celestial Excursions (2004) Lovely Music, Ltd., CD 1007
- Robert Ashley Dust (2000) Lovely Music, Ltd., CD 1006
- Robert Ashley Your Money My Life Goodbye (1999) Lovely Music, Ltd., 1005
- John Cage John Cage at Summerstage with Joan La Barbara, William Winant and Leonard Stein (1995), Music & Arts, CD 875
- Larry Austin La Barbara on CDCM Computer Music Series, Vol. 13, The Virtuoso in the Computer Age III (1993) Centaur Records, CRC 2166
- Morton Subotnick All my hummingbirds have alibis (1993) The Voyager Company, CD-Rom LS36
- Charles Dodge The Waves on "Any Resemblance is Purely Coincidental" (1992) New Albion, NA 045
- Robert Ashley Improvement (1992) Elektra/Nonesuch, double CD 79289-2
- Steve Reich Voices and Organ (1991) Deutsche Grammaphon, CD box
- John Cage Joan La Barbara Singing Through John Cage (1990) New Albion, NA035
- Philip Glass Music in 12 Parts (1990) Virgin Records
- Morton Feldman Three Voices for Joan La Barbara (1989) New Albion, NA018
- Morton Subotnick Jacob's Room (1987) Wergo, WER2014-50
- Morton Subotnick The Last Dream of the Beast on "The Art of Joan La Barbara", Nonesuch 78029–1, 1985, LP only
- John Cage Solo for voice 45 (1978) Chiaroscuro, LP CR-196, 1978
- Lou Harrison May Rain on "Prepared Piano--the First of Four Decades" with Richard Bunger, piano, Musical Heritage Society, LP MHS-4187
- Bruce Ditmas Aeray Dust (1978) Chiaroscuro, CR-195
- Bruce Ditmas Yellow (1977) Wizard Records, LP #222, 1977, LP
- Philip Glass North Star (1977) Virgin Records, PZ-34669
- Philip Glass Music in 12 Parts (Parts 1 & 2) (1974) Virgin Records, LP
- Steve Reich Music for Mallet Instruments, Voices and Organ (1974) Deutsche Grammaphon, LP box
- Garrett List Your Own Self (1973) Opus One Records, LP
- Jim Hall Commitment (A&M/Horizon, 1976) on "Lament for a Fallen Matador (Based on "Adagio in G minor)", arr. by Don Sebesky
- Stanley Silverman and Richard Foreman Dr. Selavy's Magic Theatre (1973) Rainbow Collection records, LP
- The Living Theatre with Wavy Gravy (Hugh Romney) and The New Wilderness Preservation Band (1973)
- Don Sebesky The Rape of El Morro (1973) CTI Records LP

== See also ==
- David Tudor
