= Oar (disambiguation) =

An oar is a tool used for rowing a boat.

Oar or OAR may also refer to:

== Acronyms ==
- Offender Aid and Restoration
- Office of Oceanic and Atmospheric Research
- Olympic Athlete from Russia, formal designation of athletes from Russia who were allowed to compete at the 2018 Winter Olympics
- Operation Atlantic Resolve – US deployments to Europe in response to Russo-Ukrainian War
- Order of Augustinian Recollects, a religious order in the Roman Catholic Church founded in 1589
- Oregon Administrative Rules, rules and regulations having the force of law in Oregon, United States
- Original aspect ratio
- Marina Municipal Airport, IATA code OAR
- OAR, a jobs and resources management system for high-performance computing platforms
- Organ at risk, an organ subject to side effects of radiation therapy
- .oar, Open ARchive file used for terrain backup in OpenSimulator virtual environments

== Music ==
- O.A.R. or Of a Revolution, a band from Rockville, Maryland, United States
- Oar (album), by Skip Spence
- "Oar" (オール, Ōru), a song by P-Model from the album Karkador

== Other uses ==
- Tommy Oar, an Australian association football (soccer) player
- Oar (moth), a synonym of the moth genus Scopula
- Oar, a village in Vetiș

== See also ==
- Ore (disambiguation)
- Or (disambiguation)
