= Piano and String Quartet =

1985 composition by Morton Feldman

- Piano quintet by Morton Feldman
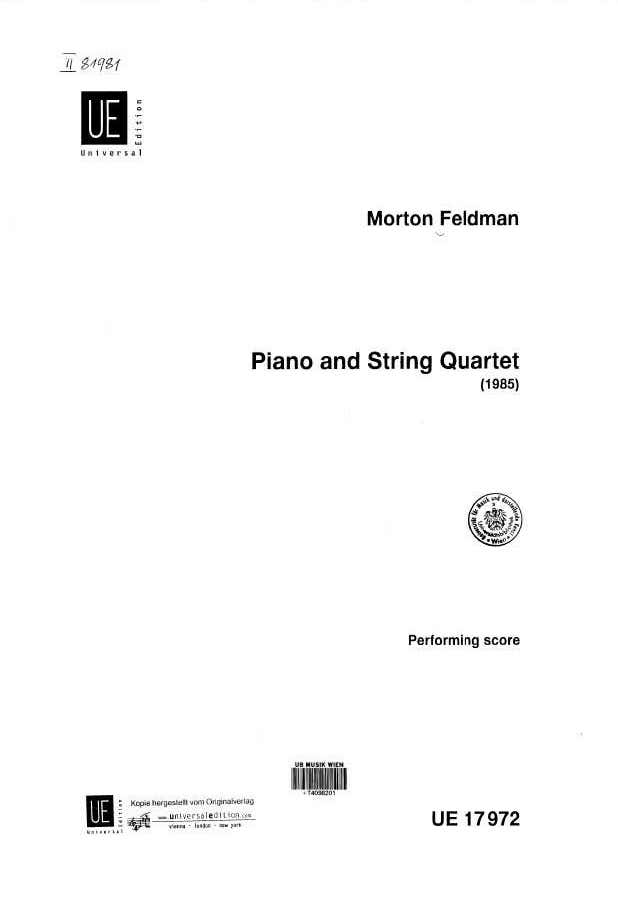
- Cover sheet of the published score
- Period: Contemporary
- Genre: Chamber music
- Style: Avant-garde
- Occasion: New Music America Festival
- Dedication: Aki Takahashi and the Kronos Quartet
- Publisher: Universal Edition (UE 17 972)
- Duration: ≈1:20:00

Premiere
- Date: November 2, 1985
- Location: Leo S. Bing Theater, Los Angeles County Museum of Art
- Performers: Aki Takahashi (piano); David Harrington (1st violin); John Sherba (2nd violin); Hank Dutt (viola); Joan Jeanrenaud (cello)

Piano and String Quartet is a composition by American avant-garde composer Morton Feldman. It was commissioned by the Kronos Quartet and pianist Aki Takahashi, who premiered the piece at the 7th annual New Music America Festival in Los Angeles and released a studio recording in 1993.

== Background ==
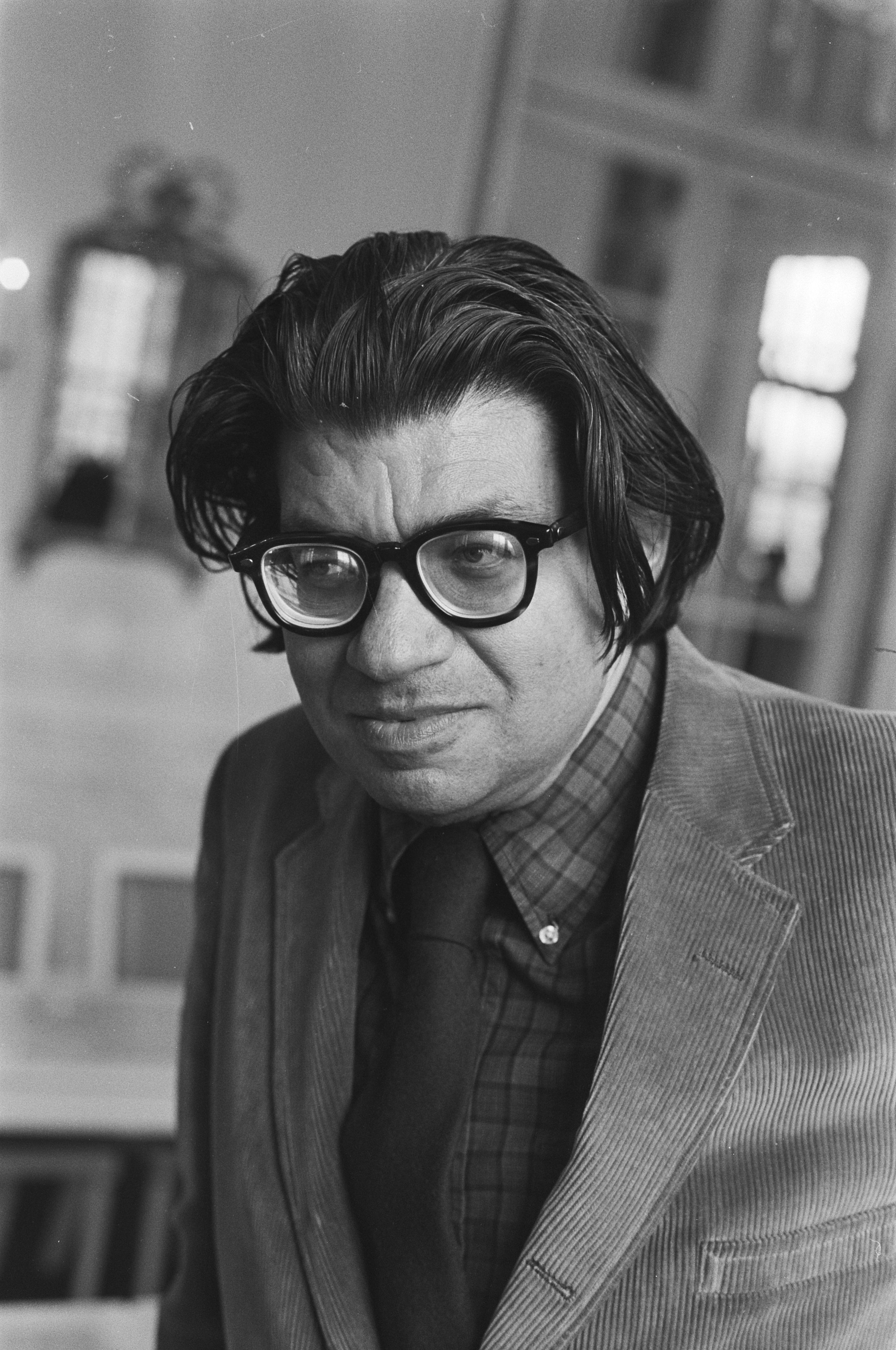
Feldman in 1976

Feldman composed Piano and String Quartet in 1985 at the age of 59. It was among his final major completed works. (Note: According to Chris Villars's catalog of the composer's known works—totaling 197 works in total, including unpublished pieces—Piano and String Quartet was Feldman's ninth-to-last composition.) He wrote the composition with the Kronos Quartet and Takahashi in mind as its performers. It was commissioned for the seventh New Music America Festival in Los Angeles. He wrote out the score by hand, as he had done for most other compositions of that period.

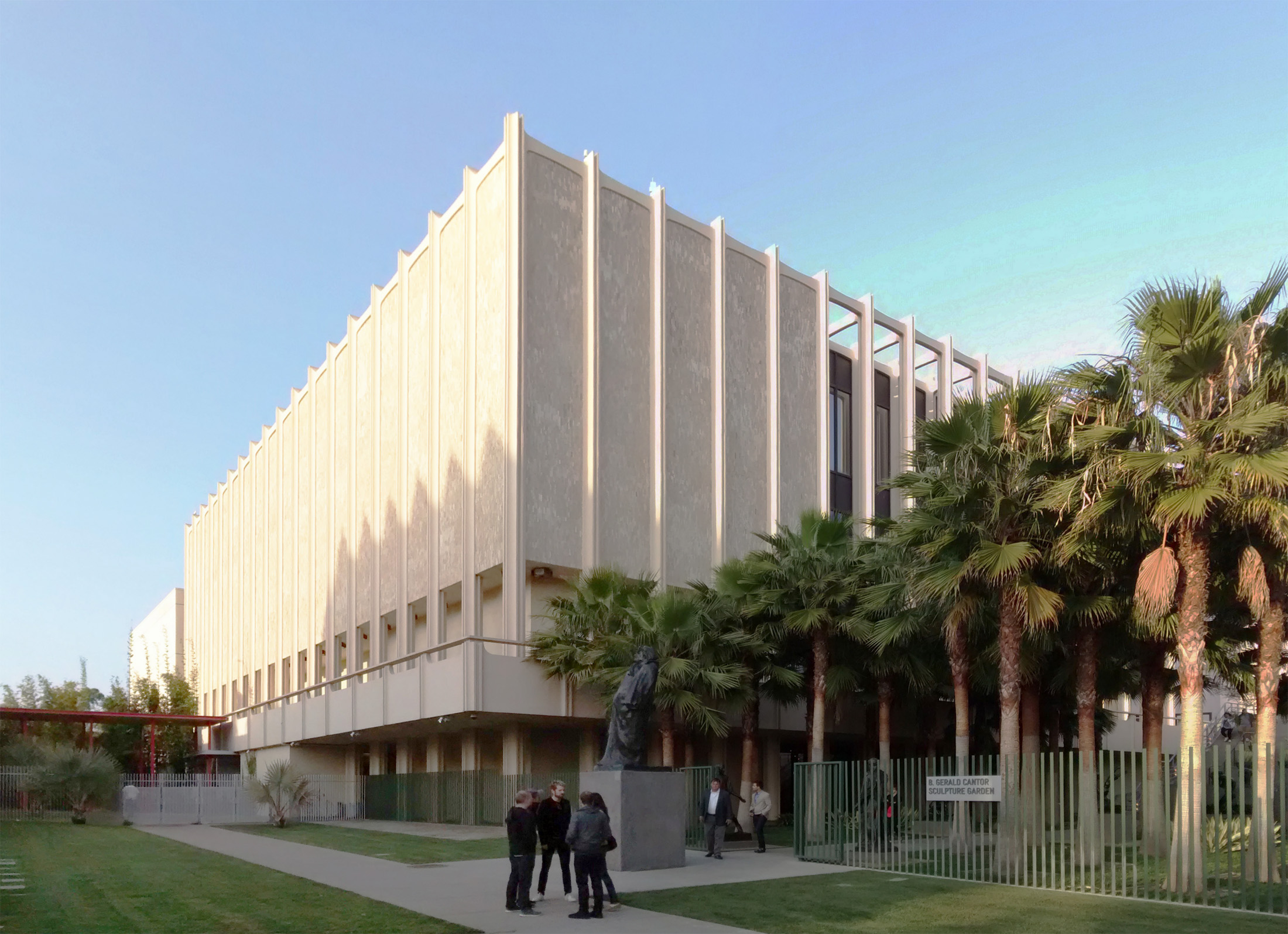
Piano and String Quartet premiered in 1985 with a performance by the Kronos Quartet at the New Music America festival, held at by the Los Angeles County Museum of Art.

On November 2, 1985, the Kronos Quartet and Takahashi premiered the piece at New Music America. The performance took place at the Leo S. Bing Theater in the Los Angeles County Museum of Art, beginning at 5 p.m. and lasting 68½ minutes. A recording of the premiere was broadcast at 8 p.m. on KUSC, the region's local classical music radio station.

Less than two years after the premiere of Piano and String Quartet, Feldman died of pancreatic cancer at the age of 61. Interest in the composer's music grew rapidly in the period after his death and his previously scarce discography was populated with numerous new recordings, mostly on independent labels. In a 1994 interview, Harrington said the following about the Kronos Quartet's work with the composer:

Morton Feldman was unlike any other composer we've ever worked with. He wrote pieces that have a sense of time and a kind of realm that is very particular to his music. And I think Piano and String Quartet is one of his great, great pieces. It's almost like feeling these incredible, warm, slow, beautiful drops of water over a long period of time. Not like a water torture, but—for me—a kind of sensual experience. You begin hearing the passage of time differently after listening to Morton's music.

Another great admirer of Piano and String Quartet, the minimalist composer Steve Reich, encountered the piece years after its premiere. Reich regarded Feldman as an early influence and a friend, but they had lost touch in the 1980s: "when Feldman started writing longer pieces," he later wrote, "I foolishly didn't take the time to listen to them and Feldman drifted out of my musical consciousness." After Feldman died, Reich belatedly sought out his final works and was astonished by their sophistication. According to Reich, Piano and String Quartet "is the most beautiful work of his that I know ... I wanted to call him, to tell him, that I had missed the boat with his late pieces, to ask how he made them—but was no longer possible."

== Music ==
Piano and String Quartet is a chamber music composition scored for piano, two violins, viola, and cello, following the standard instrumentation used in most piano quintets since the early 19th century. Feldman's piece is regarded among the most innovative piano quintets of late 20th century, alongside quintets by Rochberg and Schnittke.

Feldman composed the piece during what is now considered to be his late period, spanning 1977 until his death in 1987. In his late-period compositions, Feldman's central concern turned from timbre—i.e., the textural quality of sound—to perception of time. Piano and String Quartet typifies the composer's late-period preoccupation with time and memory. The most salient qualities of Piano and String Quartet are extremes of duration and repetition. The score contains 810 bars. A typical performance takes approximately 80–90 minutes, much longer than most music written by his peers in the avant-garde or even his own early works. However, it is only moderate length by the standard of his late works. Most of his later works last one to two hours, with a handful that endure for three hours or longer. An uninterrupted performance of his longest work—String Quartet II (1983), also composed for the Kronos Quartet—typically lasts six hours; its exceptionally long runtime influenced Feldman to write Piano and String Quartet as a much shorter piece for the quartet. (Note: The Kronos Quartet had to rush through the broadcast premiere of String Quartet II to meet a four-hour time limit imposed by CBC/Radio-Canada. First violinist David Harrington observed during the applause that Feldman, who he noted "was not shy", stayed in his seat rather than standing. Afterward, the composer explained "I had to take a pee so bad that I was afraid to stand." Harrington replied "Maybe your next piece for us should be shorter." That next piece was Piano and String Quartet, which Harrington regarded as "svelte" next to String Quartet II.)

As its title suggests, the piece sets the piano and string quartet apart as two distinct, almost detached entities. For the entirety of the piece, the musicians follow a simple pattern: the string quartet plays a sustained chord, and the pianist plays an arpeggiated or "broken" chord. The string instruments occasionally play the same pitch, creating a unison rather than a chord. After about 50 minutes, the string instruments sometimes play pizzicato, plucking rather than bowing. The sustain pedal of the piano remains pressed down for the entire performance, which indefinitely lengthens the notes and causes sympathetic resonance among the strings.

The harmonic content shifts throughout, but without a traditional sense of musical development. Its stillness has drawn comparisons to ambient music. But contrary to its apparent lack of direction, its structure is highly complex. According to the Rough Guide to classical music, the piece initially "seems to have no beginning or end, no intention or direction"; however, the listener's attention is gradually enhanced and subtle changes in tone become magnified as it progresses, until even the subtlest differences take on the capacity to impart "a resonance and an intensity that is startling." Upon reading the score, Steve Reich found that many of its "quiet mysterious chords" were in fact "inversions of themselves", and that "[r]epetitions of material were never exact repetitions". A cello motif recurs throughout, albeit in transposed variations.

== Recordings ==
As of December 2021, six recordings of Feldman's Piano and String Quartet have been commercially released.

Year	Performers		Duration	Recording information			Producer(s)	Label / (cat. no.)
Year	Quartet	Pianist	Duration	Recorded	Studio	Nation	Producer(s)	Label / (cat. no.)
1993	Kronos Quartet	Aki Takahashi	1:19:33	November 1991	Skywalker Ranch (Nicasio, California)	US	Judith Sherman	Nonesuch; 7559-79320-2
2001	Ives Ensemble	John Snijders (Note: Unlike most recordings of Piano and String Quartet—performed by a pianist and a string quartet, who are credited separately—the Ives Ensemble is a complete quintet with Snijders as a member. For this reason their recording is credited only to the Ives Ensemble, not to the ensemble 'and' or 'with' Snijders.)	1:13:51	October 1–2, 1998	Sendesaal des Hessischen Rundfunks (Frankfurt)	Germany	Michael Peschko	Hat Hut hat[now]ART 128
2009	Smith Quartet	John Tilbury	1:29:30	November 26, 2006	St. Paul's Hall (Huddersfield, England)	United Kingdom	Sebastian Lexer	Matchless; MRDVD-01
2011	Eclipse Quartet	Vicki Ray	1:19:10	February 8, 2011	Firehouse Recording Studios (Pasadena, California)	US	Erika Duke-Kirkpatrick; Jeff Gauthier	Bridge; 9369
2014	Opus Posth Ensemble	Mikhail Dubov	1:11:56	2009	Rachmaninoff Hall, Moscow Conservatory (Moscow)	Russia	Lyudmila Dmitrieva	Long Arms; CDLA 14096
2021	Apartment House	Mark Knoop (Note: Knoop is a member of Apartment House; he is not credited as a separate artist on the recording.)	1:19:50	March 2021	Henry Wood Hall (London)	United Kingdom	Simon Reynell	Another Timbre at182
Average: 1:18:59								

=== Kronos Quartet with Aki Takahashi (1993) ===
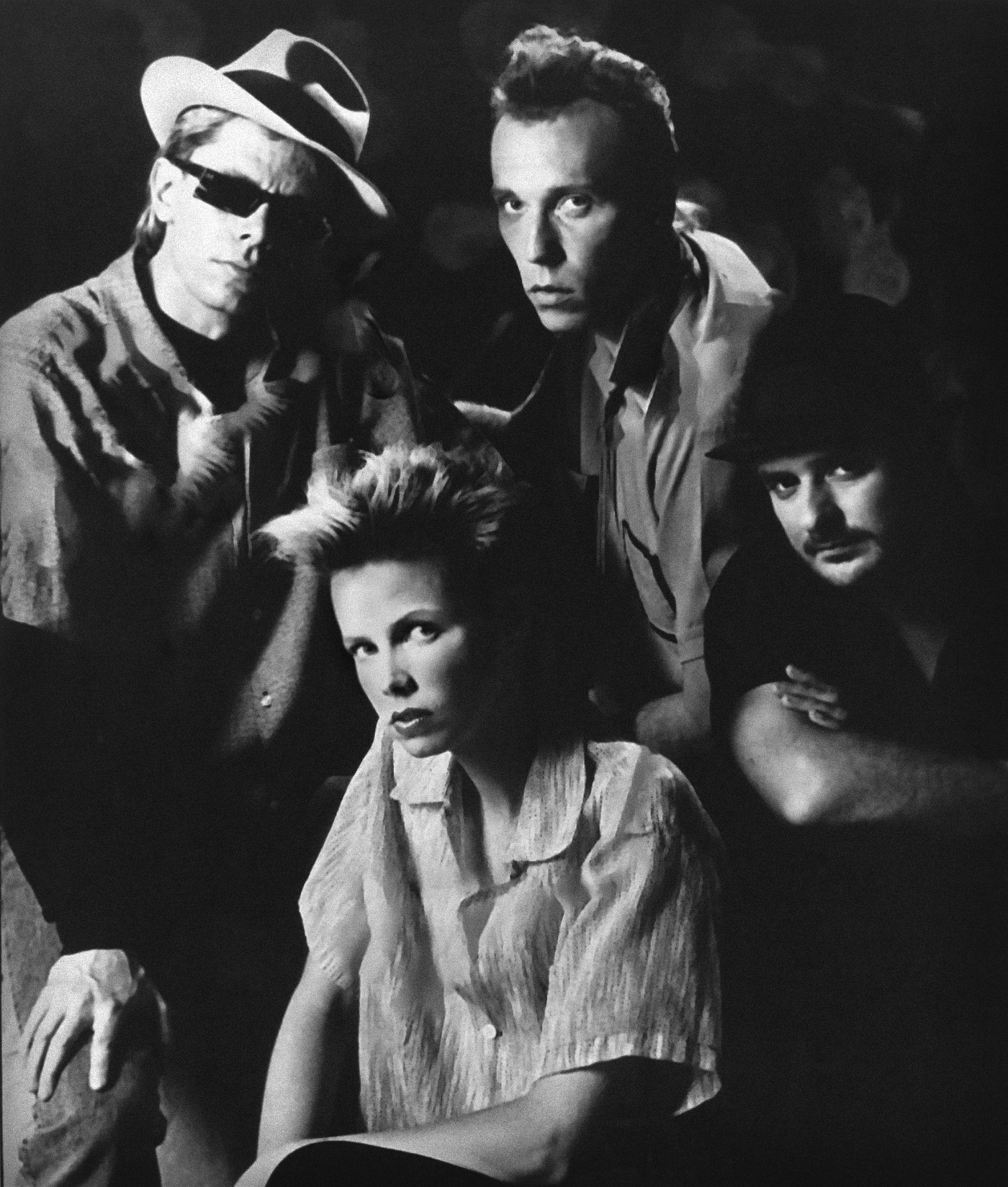
The Kronos Quartet c. 1987

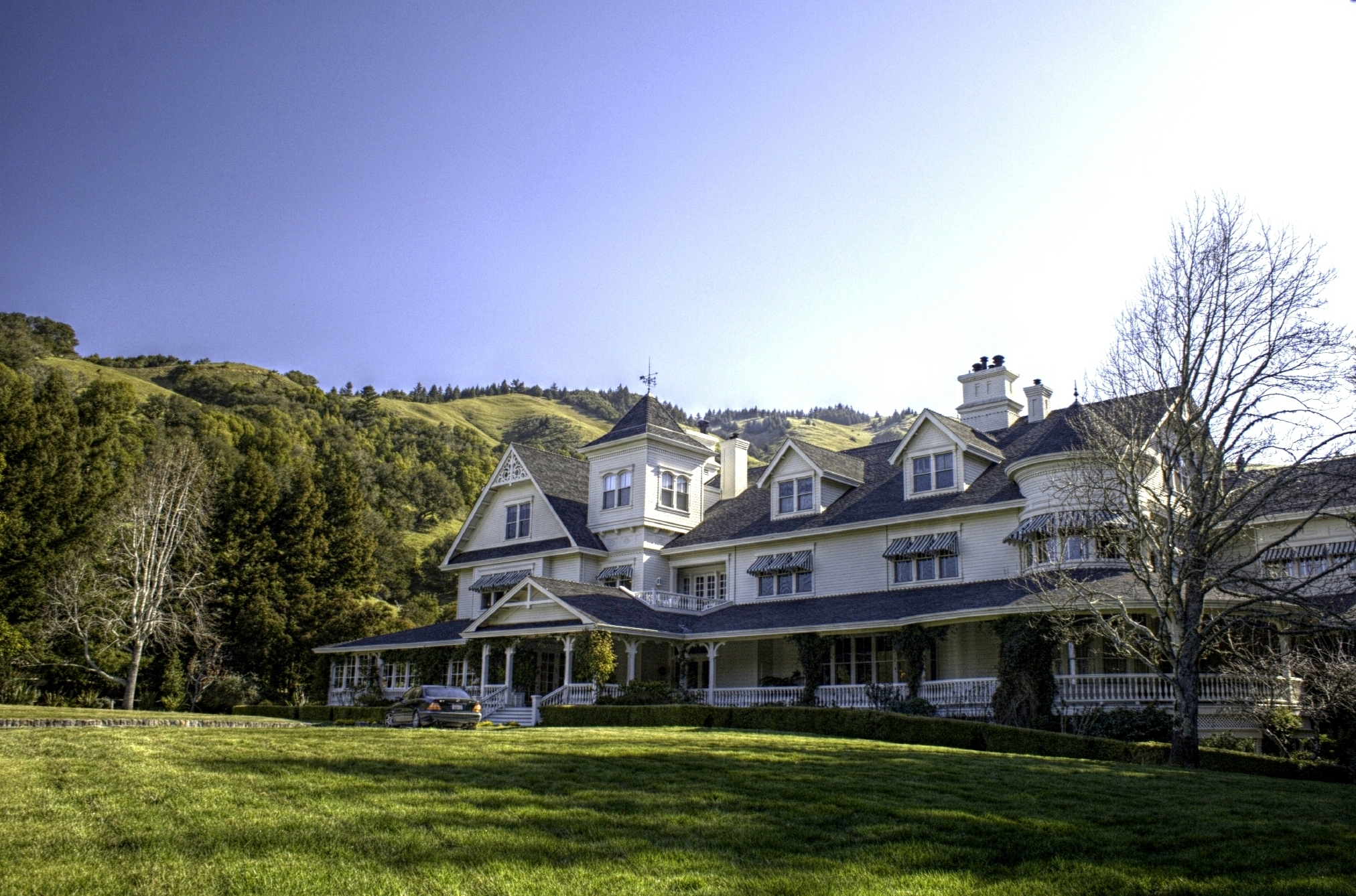
Skywalker Ranch, 2009

The Kronos Quartet and Takahashi recorded the piece in November 1991 at Skywalker Ranch in Nicasio, California, with production by Judith Sherman. By that time, the Kronos Quartet and Sherman had become frequent collaborators. She had produced some of the quartet's most acclaimed albums, including their 1990 studio recording of George Crumb's Black Angels. Sherman called the Skywalker facilities "the most perfect recording room", noting that the reverberation was distributed remarkably evenly across the frequency band.

The album was released on September 28, 1993, through Nonesuch Records, a subsidiary of Elektra that had been the quartet's record label since 1985. It was positively received by critics. John von Rhein of the Chicago Tribune praised the performers' "miraculous control, dedication and concentration". Although he cautioned that less-adventurous listeners may find the recording to be "the aural equivalent of Chinese water torture, made all the more excruciating by its quiet dynamics and lack of rhythmic, melodic or harmonic gesture", he noted that "[o]thers will find Feldman's tranquil, self-contained sounds a balm for ears and spirit long since turned off by the busy density that characterizes so much new music." Art Lange called it "[m]usic unlike any other" in a review for the classical music magazine Fanfare, though he hedged that those already "familiar with Feldman's idiom" would likely consider the newly recorded piece "different enough, without making any major breakthroughs". The Wire's Andy Hamilton wrote "I'm not sure I fully understand what it's about, but this composer is certainly a deep cat."

Glenn Swan of AllMusic called the recording "[b]reathtaking" and wrote that the musicians "conjure up the ghost of Feldman to wander the streets of New York as if they were abandoned. This single piece, over 79 minutes in length, is like an icy flower that blooms almost undetected." Reviewing the Kronos Quartet for the 1995 Spin Alternative Record Guide, critic Alex Ross gave the record a perfect score—the highest rating for the quartet's discography—and called it "the group's major achievement so far". In the 2002 book Classical Music: The Listener's Companion, Raymond S. Tuttle recommended it as an "excellent" and comparatively accessible entry point for a listener new to Feldman's music: "Once you surrender traditional expectations about what music is supposed to do, you're overwhelmed by its ethereal beauty". In an article recommending the best music for each hour of the day, rock musician Elvis Costello cited it as the best record to listen to at 4 a.m., writing "Feldman's almost seamless fabric of music ... is both hypnotic and transporting". When Takahashi returned to Los Angeles in 2006 for her first concert there since the 1985 premiere of Piano and String Quartet, Mark Swed said her recording with the Kronos Quartet was "now a classic in the modern chamber repertory".

Sherman received the Grammy Award for Producer of the Year, Classical at the 36th Annual Grammy Awards in March 1994. The studio version of Piano and String Quartet with Takahashi appeared on the third disc of the 1998 compilation Kronos Quartet: 25 Years, a ten-CD box set.

=== Subsequent recordings ===
==== Ives Ensemble (2001) ====
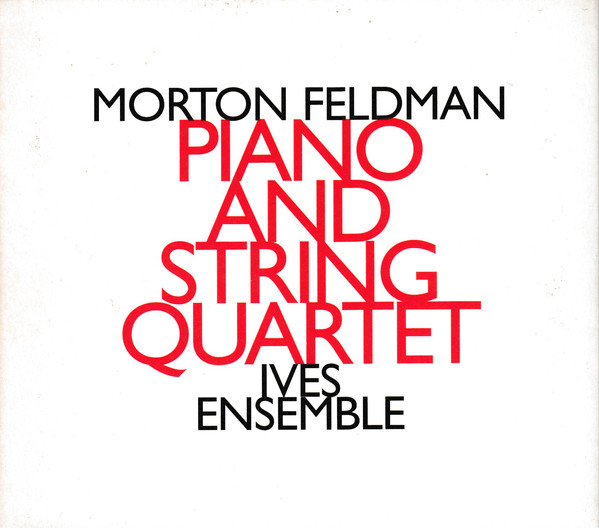
CD cover (Hat Hut)

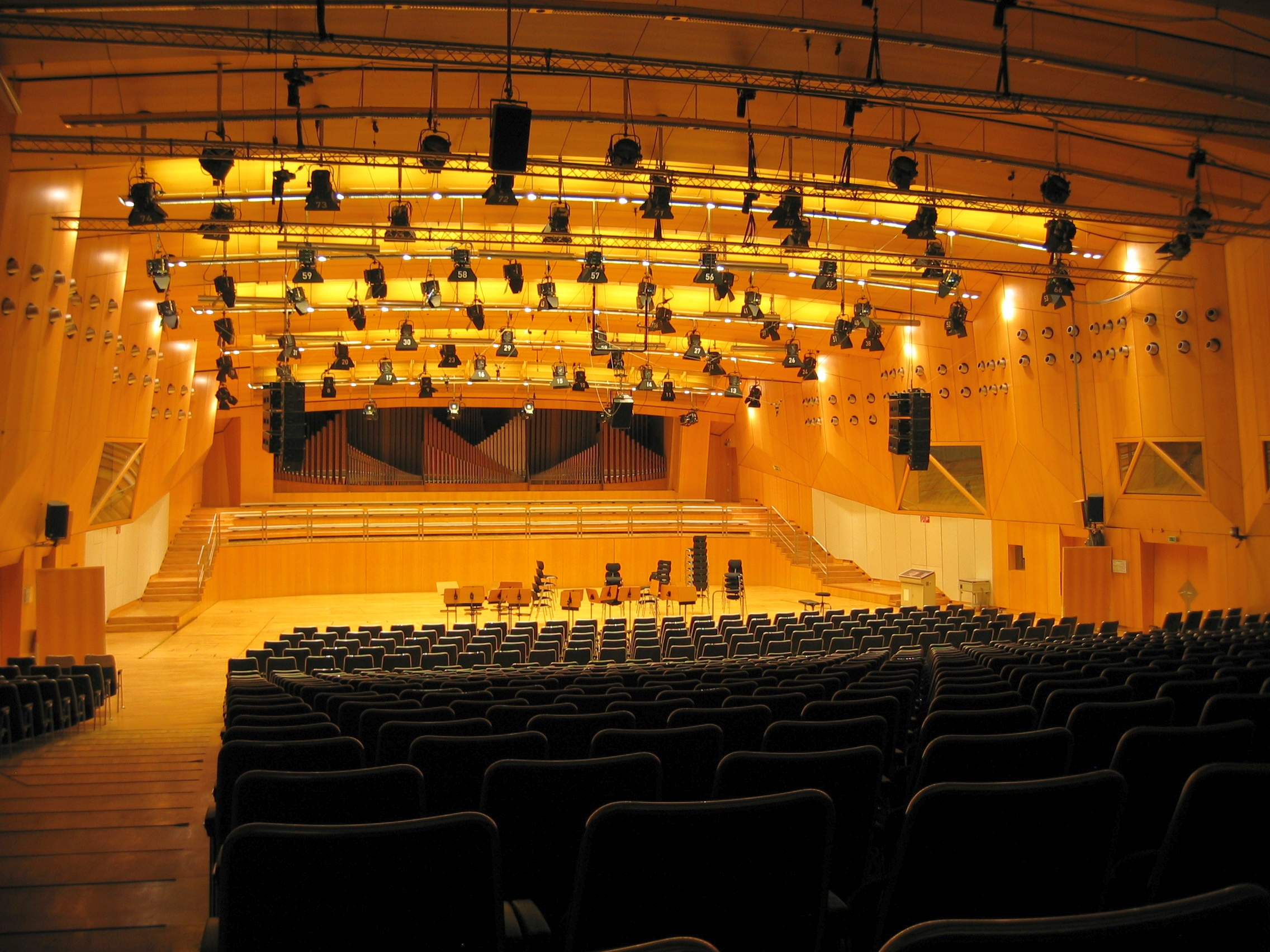
HR Sendesaal, 2011

==== Tilbury and the Smith Quartet (2009) ====
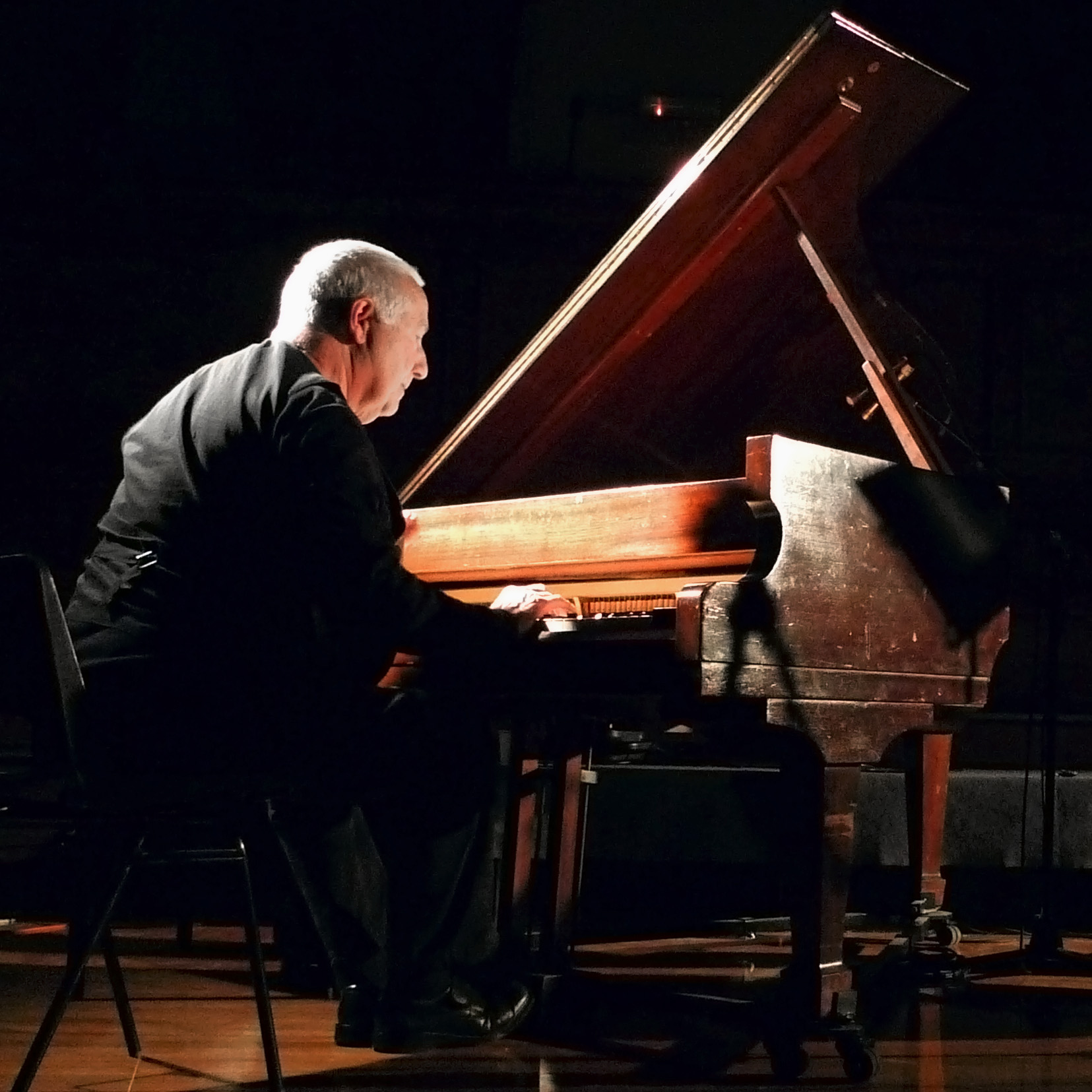
John Tilbury, 2011

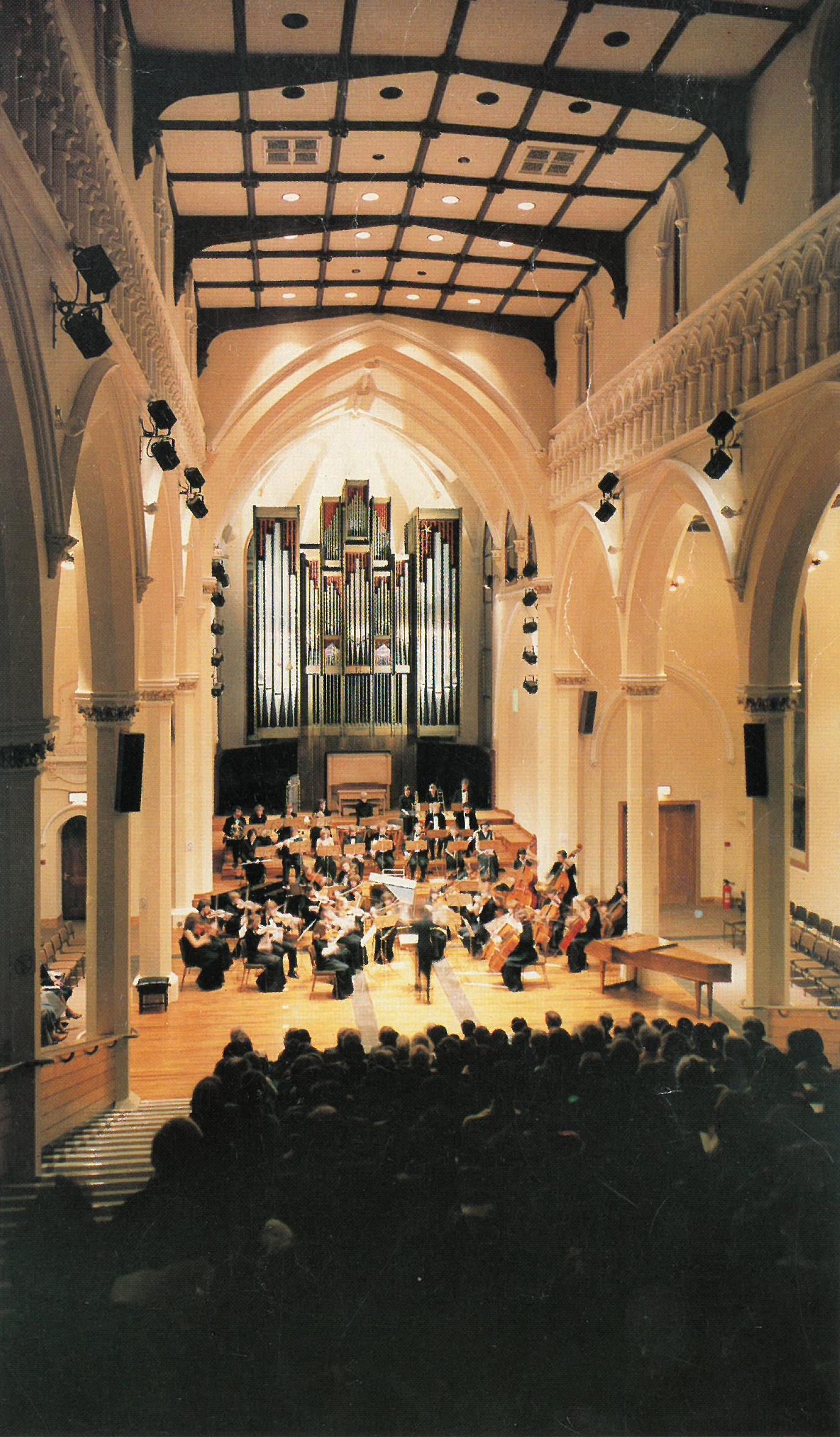
St. Paul's Hall, 1980

John Tilbury and the Smith Quartet played the piece at the 2006 Huddersfield Contemporary Music Festival on November 26. Selected live recordings from those performances were released in three volumes by Matchless Recordings in audio-only DVD format, which allowed for uninterrupted playback of the long recordings on a single disc. Just shy of 90 minutes, it is the longest recorded performance of the piece. The Smith Quartet played without vibrato and loosened their bows to enable longer, softer tones.

Colin Clarke of the journal Tempo praised "the utmost delicacy" of Tilbury's playing and compared the recording favorably to the original: "The sense of space, so evident in the Nonesuch version, is here even more entrenched—there is almost a feeling of risk in how long the gaps between statements of the prevailing arpeggio figure can last." Critics named it among the 10 best "Modern Composition" releases of 2010 in The Wire's year-in-review Rewind issue.

==== Opus Posth Ensemble and Mikhail Dubov (2014) ====
The CD was released by Long Arms Records, a label co-founded by the composer Sergey Kuryokhin. Opus Posth performed the piece once more for a CD release concert at the Moscow International House of Music on January 31, 2015.

== Bibliography ==
- Anon. (November 26, 2011). "Piano and String Quartet". La Nación (in Spanish). Buenos Aires. ProQuest 734005592. "Lo primero que llama la atención es el nombre; más que un quinteto con piano, Piano and String Quartet es realmente un piano y un cuarteto de cuerdas enfrentados como dos instancias independientes" [The first thing that stands out is the name; more than a piano quintet, Piano and String Quartet is really a piano and a string quartet facing each other as two independent instances.]
- Anon. (January 28, 2015). "Concerts". The Moscow Times. Archived from the original on September 30, 2020.
- Bambarger, Bradley (May 13, 1995). "Judith Sherman: Kronos' Sonic Guide". Billboard. Vol. 107, no. 9. p. 100 – via the Internet Archive.
- Blumenthal, Howard J. (1998). "Kronos Quartet". The Classical CD Listener's Guide. New York: Billboard Books. pp. 196–197. ISBN 0-8230-7676-8 – via the Internet Archive.
- Cariaga, Daniel (November 4, 1985). "New Music American '85: Feldman Quintet, Other Works Premiere at Fest". Part VI: Calendar. Los Angeles Times. pp. 1–2 – via Newspapers.com.
- Clark, Philip (August 2001). "The Primer: Morton Feldman". The Wire. No. 210. London. pp. 40–47 – via Exact Editions.
- Clark, Philip; Hamilton, Andy (January 2011). "Genre Charts A–Z: Modern Composition". The Wire. No. 323. London. p. 48 – via Exact Editions.
- Clarke, Colin (July 2010). "Feldman: Music for Piano and Strings, Volume 1: For John Cage; Piano and String Quartet". Tempo. 64 (253). Cambridge University Press: 67. JSTOR 40795158.
- Clements, Andrew (February 18, 2010). "Feldman/Tilbury/Smith Quartet: For John Cage; Piano and String Quartet". The Guardian. London. Archived from the original on June 24, 2017.
- Clements, Andrew (January 12, 2012). "Feldman: Piano and String Quartet – review – Ray/Eclipse Quartet (Bridge)". The Guardian. London. Archived from the original on September 30, 2020.
- Costello, Elvis (2003). "Rocking Around the Clock". In Groening, Matt; Bresnick, Paul (eds.). Da Capo Best Music Writing 2003: The Year's Finest Writing on Rock, Pop, Jazz, Country, & More. Cambridge, Massachusetts: Da Capo Press. pp. 277–288. ISBN 0-306-81236-3 – via the Internet Archive (registration required).
- Fenton, David (January 20, 2001). "Piano quintet". Grove Music Online (8th ed.). Oxford University Press. doi:10.1093/gmo/9781561592630.article.21644. ISBN 978-1-56159-263-0. (subscription, Wikilibrary access, or UK public library membership required)
- Gardner, James (November 30, 2006). "Interview with John Tilbury". cnvill.net. Archived from the original on December 27, 2019.
- Hamilton, Andy (December 1993 – January 1994). "Kronos Quartet At the Grave of Richard Wagner Elektra Nonesuch 7559-79318 CD / Kronos Quartet Morton Feldman: Piano and String Quartet Elektra Nonesuch 7559-79320 CD / Silvestre Revueltas The String Quartets New Albion NA062 CD". The Wire. No. 118–119. London – via Exact Editions.
- Harrington, David (October 2009). "Personal Bests: Morton Feldman – String Quartet II (1983)" (PDF). Chamber Music. Vol. 26, no. 5. New York: Chamber Music America. p. 97. Archived (PDF) from the original on October 3, 2020.
- Keillor, John. Morton Feldman – Piano and String Quartet at AllMusic ("The opportunity to hear these different musical bodies luxuriating as separate bodies in a common soundscape is a uniquely revealing method for Feldman ...")
- Kuhn, Laura (Autumn–Winter 1985). "And the Winner Is... New Music America '85, Los Angeles, October 31 – November 11, 1985". Perspectives of New Music (review of the premiere). 24 (1): 434–439. doi:10.2307/832796. JSTOR 832796.
- Lange, Art (March–April 1994). "Feldman: Piano and String Quartet. Aki Takahashi, piano; Kronos Quartet. Elektra/Nonesuch 9 79320-2 [DDD?]; 79:40. Produced by Judith Sherman and Kronos Quartet". Fanfare. Vol. 17, no. 4. p. 184.
- Maddocks, Fiona (February 20, 2010). "Morton Feldman: Music for Piano and Strings Vol 1 / Smith Quartet, John Tilbury (piano) (Matchless Recordings)". The Observer. London: Guardian Media Group. Archived from the original on March 11, 2017.
- Paccione, Paul (Spring 2010). "Morton Feldman. For Christian Wolff. California E.A.R. Unit. Dorothy Stone, flute. Vicki Ray, piano/celesta. 2008. Liner notes by Alan Rich and Rand Steiger. Bridge 7279 A/C". American Music. 28 (1). Champaign: University of Illinois Press: 136–139. doi:10.5406/americanmusic.28.1.0136. Gale A400786193.
- Pluhar-Schaeffer, Garrett (April 19, 2014). Forgetting Music: Duration, Space, and Remembrance in the Late Music of Morton Feldman (Thesis). Lake Forest, Illinois: Lake Forest College. Archived from the original on November 2, 2018.
- Reich, Steve (2002). "Feldman (1997)". Writings on Music, 1965–2000. New York: Oxford University Press. p. 202. ISBN 0-19-511171-0 – via Google Books.
- Ross, Alex (June 12, 2006). "American Sublime". The New Yorker. New York: Condé Nast. Archived from the original on November 26, 2020.
- Ross, Alex (1995). "Kronos Quartet". In Weisbard, Eric; Marks, Craig (eds.). Spin Alternative Record Guide. New York: Vintage Books. pp. 217–218. ISBN 0-679-75574-8.
- Sanderson, Blair. Morton Feldman: Piano and String Quartet – Eclipse Quartet, Vicki Ray, Nonesuch at AllMusic
- Sani, Frank (2000). "Why patterns? An analysis of Morton Feldman's 'Piano and string quartet'". cnvill.net. Archived from the original on December 27, 2019.
- Simons, Ted (March 16, 1994). "And Now for Something Completely Different: The Kronos Quartet Breathes the Kiss of Life into Classical Music". Phoenix New Times. Archived from the original on October 4, 2020.
- Slonimsky, Nicolas (1994). Music Since 1900 (5th ed.). New York: Schirmer Books. ISBN 0-02-872418-6 – via the Internet Archive (registration required).
- Staines, Joe; Buckley, Jonathan, eds. (1998). "Morton Feldman". Classical Music: The Rough Guide. Rough Guides (2nd ed.). London: Penguin Group. pp. 146–147. ISBN 1-85828-257-8 – via the Internet Archive.
- Swan, Glenn (n.d.). "Morton Feldman: Piano and String Quartet – Kronos Quartet / Aki Takahashi". AllMusic. Archived from the original on August 25, 2017.
- Swed, Mark (September 28, 1993). Morton Feldman: Piano and String Quartet (liner notes). New York: Nonesuch. 79320-2 – via the Internet Archive.
- Swed, Mark (November 14, 2006). "Covering Feldman, Garland and the Beatles". Los Angeles Times.
- Taylor, Hollis (February–March 1999). "A Kronos Quartet Retrospective". Strings. 13 (6). Richmond, California: Stringletter Media. Archived from the original on October 3, 2020 – via Questia.
- Tuttle, Raymond S. (2002). "Morton Feldman". In Morin, Alexander J. (ed.). Classical Music: The Listener's Companion. San Francisco: Backbeat Books. pp. 315–316. ISBN 0-87930-638-6 – via the Internet Archive.
- Villars, Chris, ed. (August 27, 2019). "Morton Feldman Works" (PDF). cnvill.net. Archived (PDF) from the original on December 27, 2019.
- Villars, Villars, ed. (December 13, 2021). "Morton Feldman Recordings on CD" (PDF). cnvill.net. Archived (PDF) from the original on January 29, 2022.
- von Rhein, John (November 14, 1993). "Morton Feldman: Piano and String Quartet Aki Takahashi, piano; Kronos String Quartet (Elektra Nonesuch)". Chicago Tribune.
