= Three Voices =

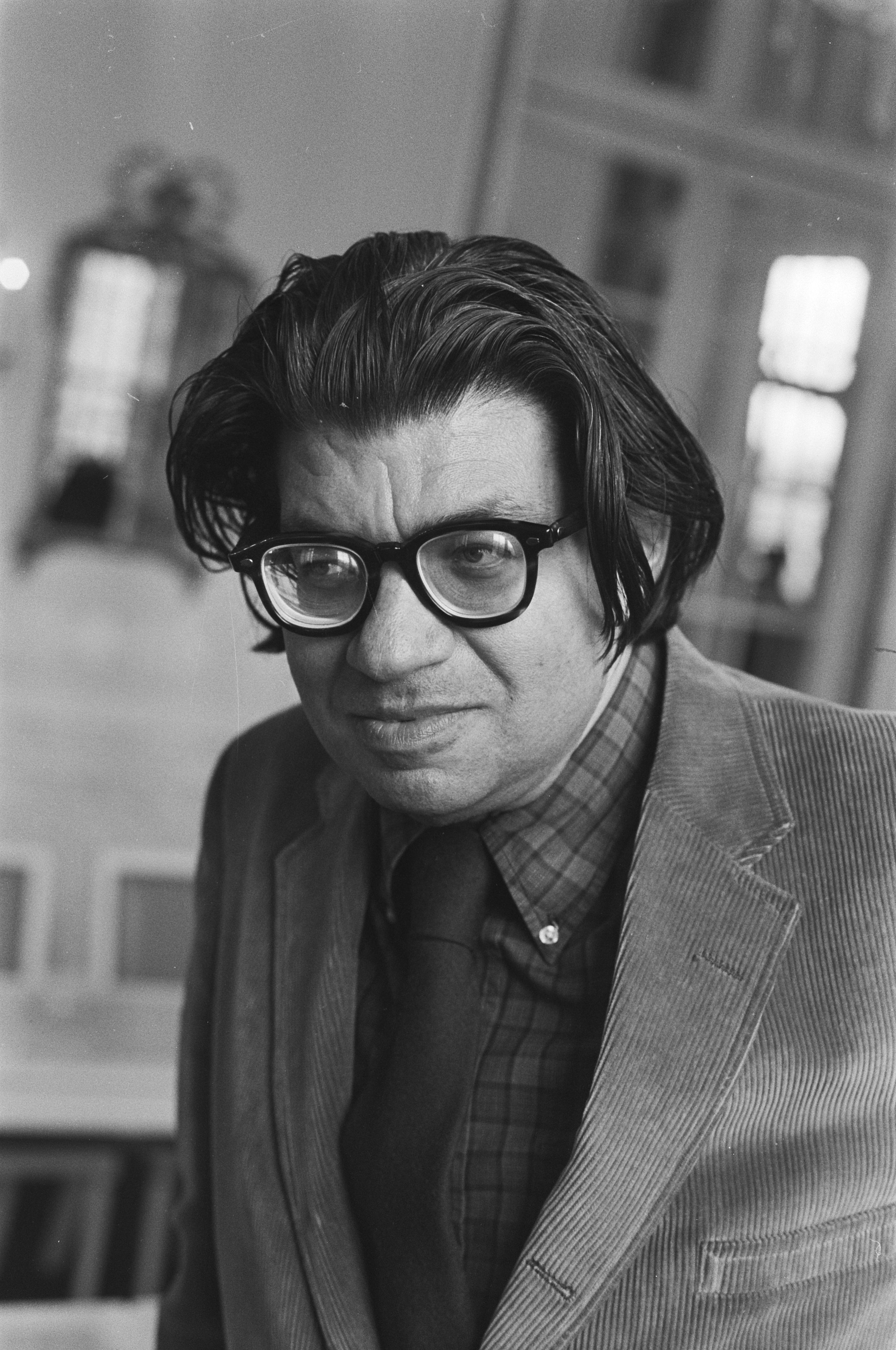
Morton Feldman in 1976

Three Voices is a 1982 composition by Morton Feldman, written in homage to his friends Philip Guston and Frank O’Hara, and dedicated to Joan La Barbara. The work consists of three vocal parts: Feldman's original intention was that a singer would perform one part while being accompanied by pre-recordings of the two other parts. Alternatively the piece may be performed by three voices. Most of the work is sung without text, but Feldman also incorporates two lines from O’Hara's 1957 poem Wind.
