= Barbara Monk Feldman =

Canadian composer

- Born: January 18, 1953 (age 73)
- Occupation: Composer

Barbara Monk Feldman is a Canadian composer. She was born in 1953, in Montreal, Quebec, Canada.

== Education ==
She studied composition with Bengt Hambraeus at McGill University from 1980 to 1983 where she achieved her MMus and then at the Hochschule für Musik Freiburg, Germany. Following this, she earned her PhD at the University at Buffalo, The State University of New York from 1984 to 1987 supported by the Edgard Varèse Fellowship. In Buffalo, she studied with the composer Morton Feldman, whom she married in 1987 just prior to his death from pancreatic cancer.

== Works ==
Monk Feldman is fascinated by the relationship between sound and silence. She has written that she sees this relationship as

'about an inside and an outside for art itself, and how ephemeral that is. For example, an unexpected moment in the sculpture of Giacometti, where it's as though you suddenly have a brief glimpse into infinity. Or where in Cézanne you have an equally unpredictable experience in a fleeting recognition of something transient in the landscape. These moments are like a kind of recognition – and ironically, they include something that seems to come to us from the inside'.

=== Stage ===
- Pyramus and Thisbe (2010)
- Io and Prometheus (2019)

=== Orchestra ===
- Design for String Orchestra (1980)
- The Northern Shore for Percussion, Piano and Chamber Orchestra (2018)

=== Chamber ===
- Movement for Solo Viola (1979)
- Trio for Violin, Cello and Piano (1984)
- Variations for Six String Instruments (1986)
- Two Flutes and Vibraphone (1987)
- Duo for Piano and Percussion (1988)
- The Immutable Silence (1990)
- Pure Difference (1990)
- Shadow (1991)
- Three Clarinets and Percussion (1994)
- Verses for Metal, Wood and Drums (1994)
- Verses for Five (1996)
- The Northern Shore (1997)
- Verses for Vibraphone (1997)
- Pour un nuage violet (1998)
- Proche et lointaine...la femme (2001)
- Glockenspiel (2004)
- The Loons of Black Sturgeon Lake (2004)
- String Quartet, 'Desert-Scape' (2004)
- The Chaco Wilderness (2005)
- The Pale Blue Northern Sky (2007)
- Landscape Near La Pocatière, Québec (2007)
- A Veil for Time (2020)

=== Choral ===
- Variations for String Quartet and Chorus (1987)
- Infinite Other (1992)
- Poems by Gerard Manley Hopkins, I, II (2014)

=== Vocal ===
- The Gentlest Chord (1991)
- Three Poems by Wallace Stevens (1997)
- The Love Shards of Sappho (2001)

== Selected discography ==
- Strings, Keyboard, Percussion, Voices, Horn (2008)
- Barbara Monk Feldman: The Northern Shore; Aki Takahashi, Sabat/Clarke, Dirk Rothbrust (2012)
- Barbara Monk Feldman: Soft Horizons; Aki Takahashi, FLUX Quartet, The DownTown Ensemble (2015)
- 'Verses'; GBSR Duo (Siwan Rhys & George Barton) with Mira Benjamin (2021)
