= Open Research Europe =

Open access publishing platform

- Discipline: Multidisciplinary
- Language: English

Publication details
- History: 2021–present
- Publisher: hosted by CERN (from autumn 2026)
- Frequency: Continuous
- Open access: Yes

Standard abbreviations
- ISO 4: ORE

Indexing
- ISSN: 2732-5121

Links
- Journal homepage

Open Research Europe is a not-for-profit, open-access, peer-reviewed research publishing platform without publication fees for authors. It is based on an open peer review model, in which the publication is first published and subsequently evaluated.

Launched in 2021 by the European Commission for beneficiaries of EU funding, it has since evolved into a collective pan-European publishing initiative supported by funders and institutions across Europe, expanding the eligibility criteria to researchers from the funding countries.

== Origins of Open Research Europe ==
=== Early developments towards open scholarly publishing of EU funded research ===
From the late 2000 onwards, the European Commission has increasingly developed and implemented open science policies as an integral part of EU policy. In 2007, an initial policy paper is issued to advance open access research at the level of the European Union and of members states. As of 2014, the Commission requires its Horizon 2020 and Horizon Europe grant beneficiaries to make publications and underlying data issued from the funded research available as open access, while acknowledging they should be made “as open as possible, as closed as necessary”.

=== Launch of the first Open Research Europe platform ===
European Commission’s intentions to develop a peer-reviewed open access publication service are formulated in 2017, inspired by initiatives taken by Wellcome Trust and the Bill & Melinda Gates Foundation. The ambition to launch a publishing platform for EU-funded researchers is formally outlined in 2020, as a specific action in its strategy “A New ERA for Research and Innovation”, to “ensure that everyone benefits from research and its results”.

In 2021, Open Research Europe is launched as an open-access publishing platform for research funded through Horizon 2020 and Horizon Europe programmes, free of charge of authors. The original platform is developed and operated by F1000, a commercial publishing service (currently a Taylor and Francis subsidiary) that provides open peer review.

=== Expanding the initiative to member states ===
As the European research open access movement further unfolds, in 2022 the European Council invites member states to join the Open Research Europe initiative or to set up national open access publishing platforms. In 2023, the European Council urges the Commission and member states to support immediate and unrestricted open access in publishing research involving public funds, and to move away from private companies. In line with these conclusions, the EC considers expanding ORE’s scope into a non-for-profit European publishing platform for all Europe, with the involvement of funders from EU Member States, and commissions an independent expert study to operationalise the platform as a collective publishing enterprise.

In January 2025, ten European funding agencies and research organisations sign a declaration of intent to collectively support and fund Open Research Europe (ORE). By March 2026, six more European funding institutions join the consortium and commit to ensure that ORE gradually aligns with the principles of diamond open access.

ORE currently meets five out of the six operational criteria outlined by the European Diamond Capacity Hub for a journal to be recognised as a diamond open access journal: it is not open to all authors irrespective of their affiliation.

Moving away from F1000, ORE transitions into a new phase where it is hosted by CERN and migrating the technical interface to Public Knowledge Project (PKP)’ Open Source Software Open Journal Systems (OJS version 3.6).

The new platform is to be operational as of autumn 2026, available free of charge not only for Horizon Europe beneficiaries but also for all researchers affiliated with research and higher education institutions in countries whose funding organisations participate in the ORE Consortium.

== Publishing model ==
ORE adopts a publishing model where research articles can be submitted at any time and immediately published after an editorial check. Once published, they go through an open peer review process, using the Publish, Review, Curate (PCR) model where peer review reports and reviewer identities are openly published. Article quality is signaled through review status labels (e.g., Approved, Approved with Reservations, Not Approved). Authors can choose to publish new versions in response to reviews, with all versions and reports openly linked.

The articles are indexed in many large databases, including PubMed Central, Elseviers Scopus, ERIH PLUS, Google Scholar, Inspec, and Directory of Open Access Journals.

ORE supports the publication of several article types, including research articles, reviews, case studies, data notes, method articles, essays, systematic reviews, and software tool articles. It includes submissions from the following scientific disciplines: natural sciences, engineering and technology, medical and health sciences, agricultural and veterinary sciences, social sciences, humanities and the arts, as well as interdisciplinary sciences.

== Reception by researchers ==
Reception to the initial launch is mitigated: while free-for-all readers model is praised, researchers question the limitations inherent to author eligibility, and the lack of valorisation of publication on ORE in research assessment.

Between March 2021 and 2026, ORE had over 1,200 articles published by over 6,300 authors from more than 3,000 different institutions.

== Governance ==
The platform is hosted and operated by CERN; driven and funded by a consortium of research funding and performing organisations:

- European Commission
- Austrian Science Fund (FWF),
- European Organization for Nuclear Research (CERN),
- French National Research Agency (ANR),
- French National Centre for Scientific Research (CNRS),
- German Research Foundation (DFG), on behalf of the German Federal Ministry of Research, Technology and the Universe (BMFTR)
- Italian Ministry of Universities and Research (MUR),
- Netherlands Organisation for Scientific Research (NWO),
- Research Council of Norway (RCN),
- Foundation for Science and Technology – Portugal (FCT),
- Slovenian Research and Innovation Agency (ARIS),
- Spanish Foundation for Science and Technology (FECYT),
- Spanish National Research Council (CSIC),
- Swedish Research Funding Bodies (Forte, Formas and the Swedish Research Council),
- Swiss National Science Foundation (SNSF).

OPERAS Research Infrastructure is a partner for outreach and community engagement.

== See also ==
- Academic journals
- Open access publications
- Diamond open access
- Directory of Open Access Journals
- FAIR data
- Open peer review
