= Multidisciplinary =

Something is multidisciplinary if it relates to multiple areas of study or work. It may refer to:

- Multidisciplinary knowledge, communities or projects in academia
- Multidisciplinary artwork
- Interdisciplinary studies
- A cross-functional team
