= Stephen Eather =

Australian rules footballer

Personal information
- Full name: Stephen Eather
- Born: 24 February 1961 (age 65)
- Original team: Turvey Park
- Height: 191 cm (6 ft 3 in)
- Weight: 83 kg (183 lb)

Playing career^{1}
Years	Club	Games (Goals)
1980–81	South Melbourne	5 (0)
- ^{1} Playing statistics correct to the end of 1981.

Stephen Eather (born 24 February 1961) is a former Australian rules footballer who played with South Melbourne in the Victorian Football League (VFL).
