= Or (name) =

Or is a Hebrew-language name (Hebrew: אור), meaning "light, brilliance". It may be both a given name and a surname. Notable people with the name include:

== Given name ==
- Or Eitan (born 1981), Israeli basketball player
- Or Goren (born 1956), Israeli basketball player
- Or Paz (born 1988), Israeli comedian
- Or Sasson (born 1990), Israeli Olympic judoka
- Or Tokayev (born 1979), Israeli Olympic rhythmic gymnast
- Or (monk) (died c. 390), Egyptian Christian monk

== Surname ==
- Amir Or (born 1956), Israeli writer
- Theodor Or Israeli lawyer, Israeli Supreme Court Justice, namesake of the Or Commission
- Tomer Or (born 1978), Israeli Olympic fencer
- Shamrit Or (born 1945), Israeli songwriter, recipient of Kinor David and ACUM Prize awards
- Yosef Or (1904-1984), Israeli translator, recipient of the Tchernichovsky Prize (1951)
