= Five Pianos =

Composition by Morton Feldman

- by Morton Feldman
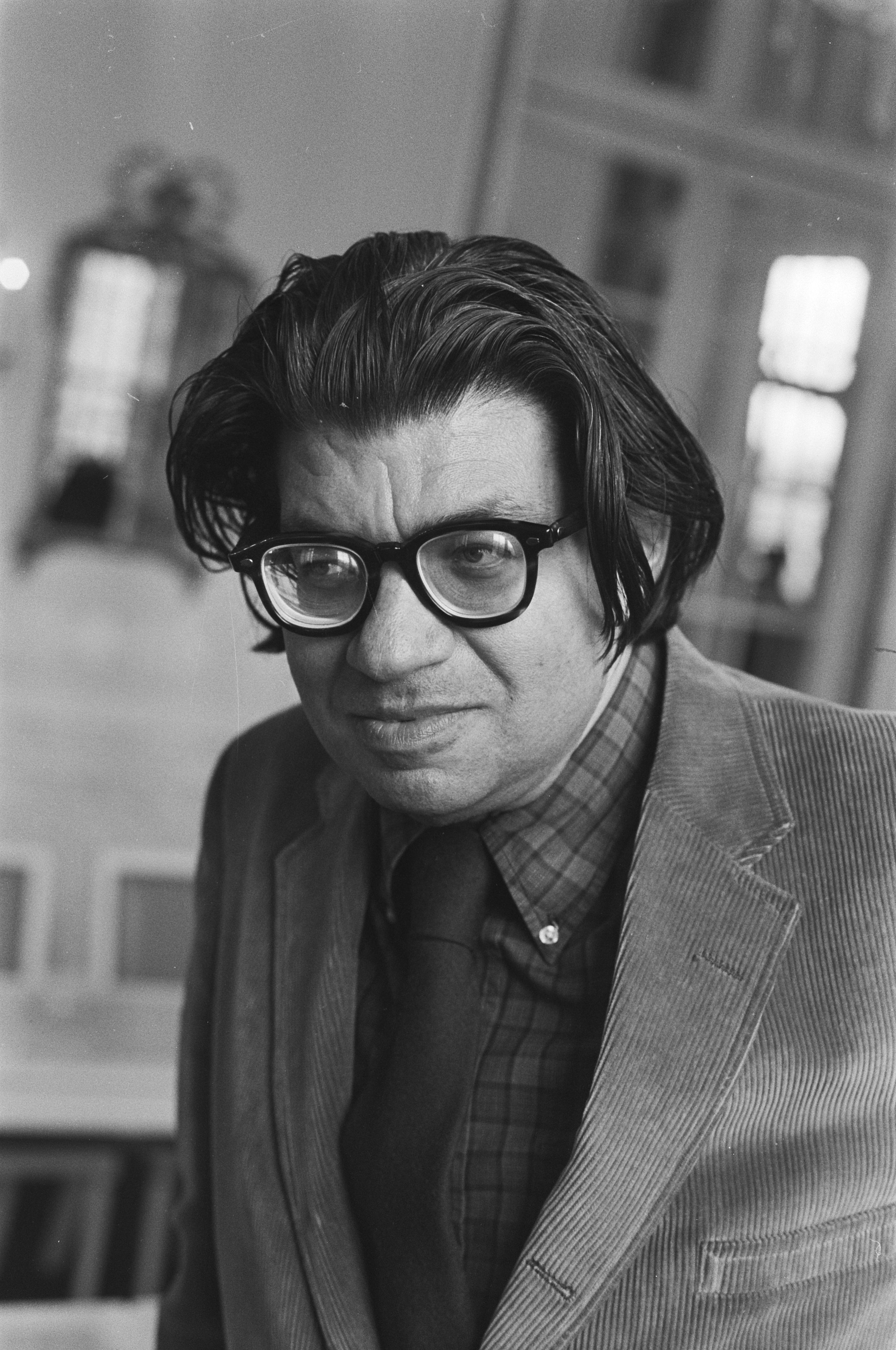
- Feldman in 1976
- Composed: January 31, 1972 – West Berlin
- Performed: July 16, 1972 – West Berlin
- Published: 1972
- Scoring: Five pianos and celesta

Five Pianos is a composition for five pianists composed in 1972 by American composer Morton Feldman. The piece is scored for five pianos and one celesta performed by the fourth pianist; the performers are also required to hum specific notes throughout the composition. It was first performed in Berlin on July 16, 1972, as part of the Berliner Musiktage festival, with the composer as one of the humming pianists.

== Background ==
Initially entitled Pianos and Voices, (Note: Pianos and Voices is a different composition from the composer, which was initially entitled Pianos and Voices II because the title was being used for Five Pianos.) Five Pianos was commissioned by Walter Bachauer on behalf of the Berliner Musiktage, while Feldman was in Berlin on a scholarship from the German Academic Exchange Service, and was completed on January 31, 1972, in Berlin. It premiered in Berlin on July 16, 1972, in a series of avant-garde concerts held in West Berlin from July 11 to 18 subtitled Spiel, Klang, Elektronik, Licht. On this occasion, the humming pianists were John Cage, Cornelius Cardew, David Tudor, Frederic Rzewski, and Feldman himself. There was a controversy in the first public performance of the piece, as a misunderstanding between Cage and Feldman caused Cage to play for twenty minutes longer than the next-slowest player. The U.S. premiere took place a few months later, in October 1972. The piece was published that same year by Universal Edition.

== Structure ==
The piece is scored for five pianos, as well as one celesta to be played by the fourth pianist. Players are also required to hum specific notes throughout the composition. The 149-bar composition takes around half an hour to perform, although the non-aligned, free-duration nature of the composition can cause the total duration to vary from one performance to another.

The score consists of whole notes with the sostenuto pedal held down throughout the whole piece. According to Feldman, the duration of these whole notes needs to continue far into the decay of sound of each individual note. Each performer is sometimes also required to hum a note after the sound of the piano. This note is marked as a square note in the score and is to be played very softly and barely audibly for three to five seconds. Each pianist has an individual part and is asked to perform independently from the rest, with no attempt for synchronization. Pianists start playing two seconds away from each other at the beginning at varying tempos (chosen by the performers), non-simultaneously fading away at the end. Feldman described the process of composing Five Pianos as follows:

[Five Pianos] began by finding myself humming tones while improvising on the piano. The vocal or humming sounds were quite short, and as the piano sounds lingered, I began to hear other pianos, other humming. Two, three, four pianos were too transparent – the fifth piano became like the pedal blur needed to complete the overall sound I was after. An occasional celeste was added to give the music a more heightened (or brighter) surface which emerges and disappears throughout the work. A recurring ostinato heard in all the pianos (the figure never repeats itself in the same tempo) is another aspect of a "surface" appearing and dissolving into this almost flat, Byzantine canvas.

— Program note for the US premiere of Five Pianos, Morton Feldman

Five Pianos is also well known for a specific motif, a scala enigmatica repeated by every pianist at different tempos specified in each bar containing the motif:

== Recordings ==
- 1991: Le Bureau des Pianistes, Stéphane Ginsburgh, Laurence Cornez, Kaat De Windt, Jean-Luc Fafchamps, Jean-Luc Plouvier – Sub Rosa SUB CD018-41
- 1994: Steffen Schleiermacher, Isabel Mundry, Mats Persson, Kristine Scholz, Nils Vigeland – Hat Hut Records hat ART CD 6143
- 2009: Amy Briggs, Helena Bugallo, Benjamin Engeli, Amy Williams, Stefan Wirth – WERGO WER 67092
