= String Quartet No. 2 (Feldman) =

1983 work by Morton Feldman

- String quartet by Morton Feldman
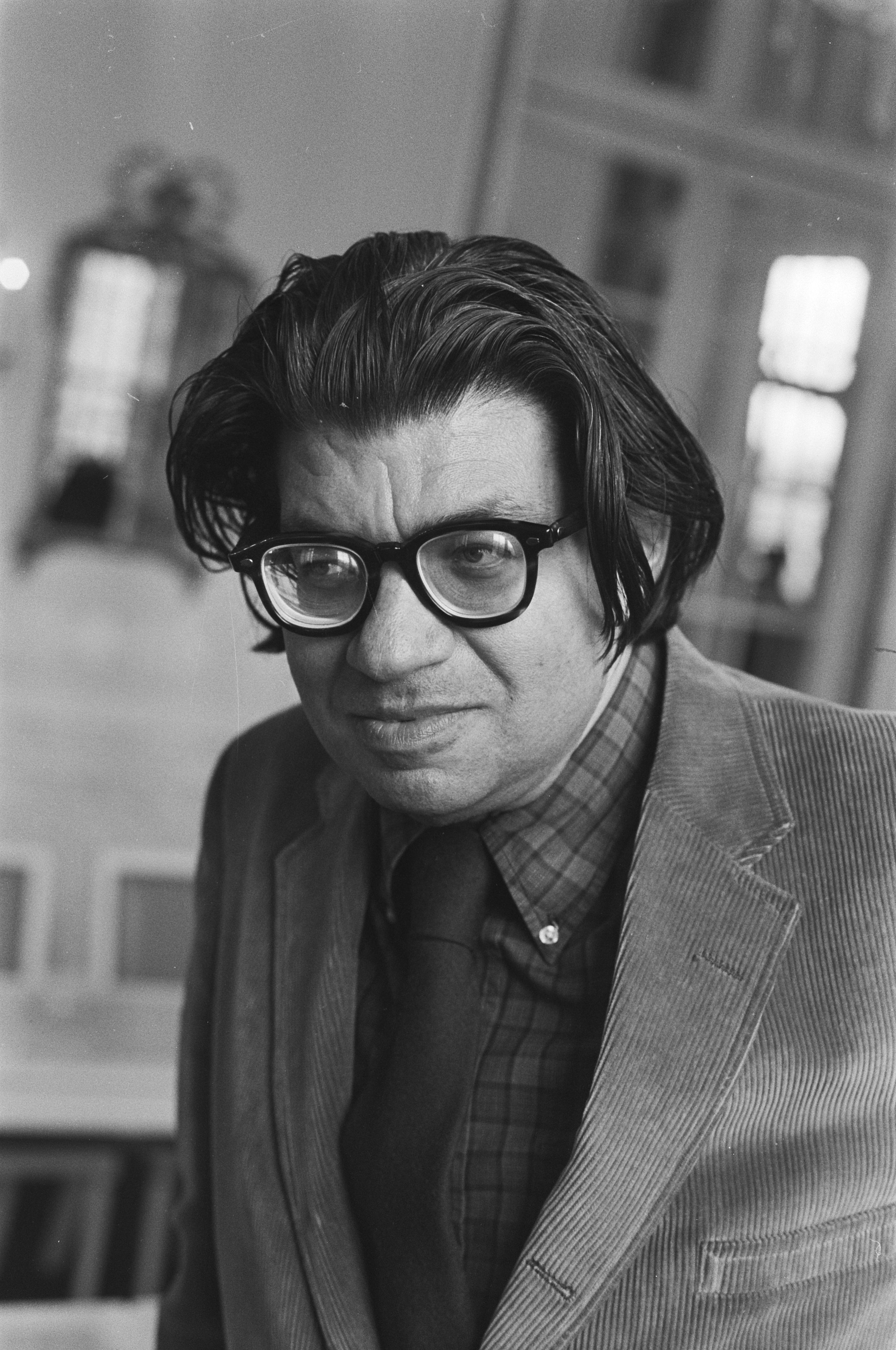
- Morton Feldman in 1976
- Year: 1983
- Commissioned by: Canadian Broadcasting Corporation
- Performed: Kronos Quartet, Toronto, 1983 (abridged premiere); FLUX Quartet, New York, 1999 (complete premiere)
- Publisher: Universal Edition
- Recorded: Ives Ensemble (August 1999)
- Duration: 4–6+ hours
- Movements: 1

Premiere
- Date: December 4, 1983 (abridged); October 9–10, 1999 (complete)
- Location: Walter Hall, Edward Johnson Building, University of Toronto (1983); Great Hall, Cooper Union (1999)

String Quartet No. 2 is a single-movement work for string quartet written by American composer Morton Feldman in 1983.

The composition is notable for its extreme duration, lasting between four and six hours depending on how the 124-page score is played. The piece's score is written such that one page may represent as much as seven minutes of music or as little as thirty seconds. It is Feldman's longest work and the composer never heard it performed in its entirety during his lifetime.

== Background ==
String Quartet No. 2 was commissioned in 1983 by the Canadian Broadcasting Corporation and premiered on December 4th of that year by the Kronos Quartet in an abridged 4.5-hour form. The CBC halted the transmission of an "important football game" in order to broadcast the entirety of the Kronos Quartet performance live.

It was performed in abridged form a number of times thereafter, and a planned 1996 performance of the complete work by the Kronos Quartet was cancelled when the group "found ... in [their] rehearsals ... that [they] are now unable to perform the work for purely physical reasons." The players reported back and shoulder pain following the commencement of rehearsals for the cancelled performance. String Quartet No. 2 was finally performed in full in 1999, by the FLUX Quartet at Cooper Union, in a performance lasting from 7:30 PM to 1:30 AM.

Of the challenges of playing the quartet, FLUX Quartet founder Tom Chiu wrote:

From the perspective of string technique, playing [String Quartet No. 2] requires incredible physical stamina. The length is a huge hurdle in itself ... Another big challenge, perhaps less obvious, is the act of playing very quietly. ... Downshifting both the speed and pressure of the bow goes against many years of training, and much repertoire requiring us to be in constant motion. Furthermore, the suspension of the right arm in mid-air – working against the gravitational pull of the arm's natural weight – can become rather uncomfortable ... To deal with this, we are constantly experimenting to find ways to minimize motion and streamline energy use.

Much has been made about the biological challenges of performing [String Quartet No. 2] ... I have learned that the lack of bathroom breaks is just one part of the biological equation. The other physical component is about fending off dehydration and the depletion of energy, which is far more critical than any concerns of a biological mishap. Moreover, it has become clear that the challenge of maintaining mental focus exceeds the physical demands. It's just way too easy to get swept up in Feldman's mesmerizing sonorities.

The quartet has been performed by Ne(x)tworks at ISSUE Project Room in 2010 and the Spektral Quartet at the Museum of Contemporary Art Chicago in 2017. Three recordings of String Quartet No. 2 have been issued: one by the Ives Ensemble (recorded 1999, released 2001 by Hat Hut), one by the FLUX Quartet (recorded 2001, released 2002 by Mode), and one by the Pellegrini Quartet (released 2018 by God as a six-LP set, the work's first issuance on vinyl). In November 2026, FLUX Quartet performed the work in the Graphic Content Festival at Saint Michael's Church in Manhattan.
