= Oare =

Oare may refer to:

== Places in England ==
- Oare, Berkshire, near Newbury
- Oare, Kent, near Faversham
  - Oare Marshes, internationally important nature reserve near Faversham
  - Oare Meadow, nature reserve in Oare managed by the Kent Wildlife Trust
- Oare, Somerset, near Minehead
- Oare, Wiltshire, near Marlborough

== Other ==
- Oare (song), in Romanian popular music
- Oare Water, river in Somerset, England
