= Either/or =

Either/or and related terms may refer to:

- Either/Or (Kierkegaard book), an 1843 book by Søren Kierkegaard
- Either/Or (Batuman novel), a 2022 novel by Elif Batuman
- Either/Or (album), a 1997 album by Elliott Smith
- Either/Or, a 1999 British comedy game show written and presented by Simon Munnery
- either...or and neither...nor, examples of correlative conjunctions in English
- Exclusive or, the logical meaning of "either ... or ... but not both"
- Logical disjunction, the logical meaning of "either ... or ... or both"
- Either-or fallacy, another name for false dilemma
- Either–or topology, a structure in mathematics

== See also ==
- For some other uses of the English words either and neither:
  - Correlative conjunction
  - English determiners
  - Indefinite pronoun
  - Wiktionary entries for either and neither
- Or (disambiguation)
- Nor (disambiguation)
- Ether Or
