= Neither (opera) =

Opera by Morton Feldman

- Opera by Morton Feldman
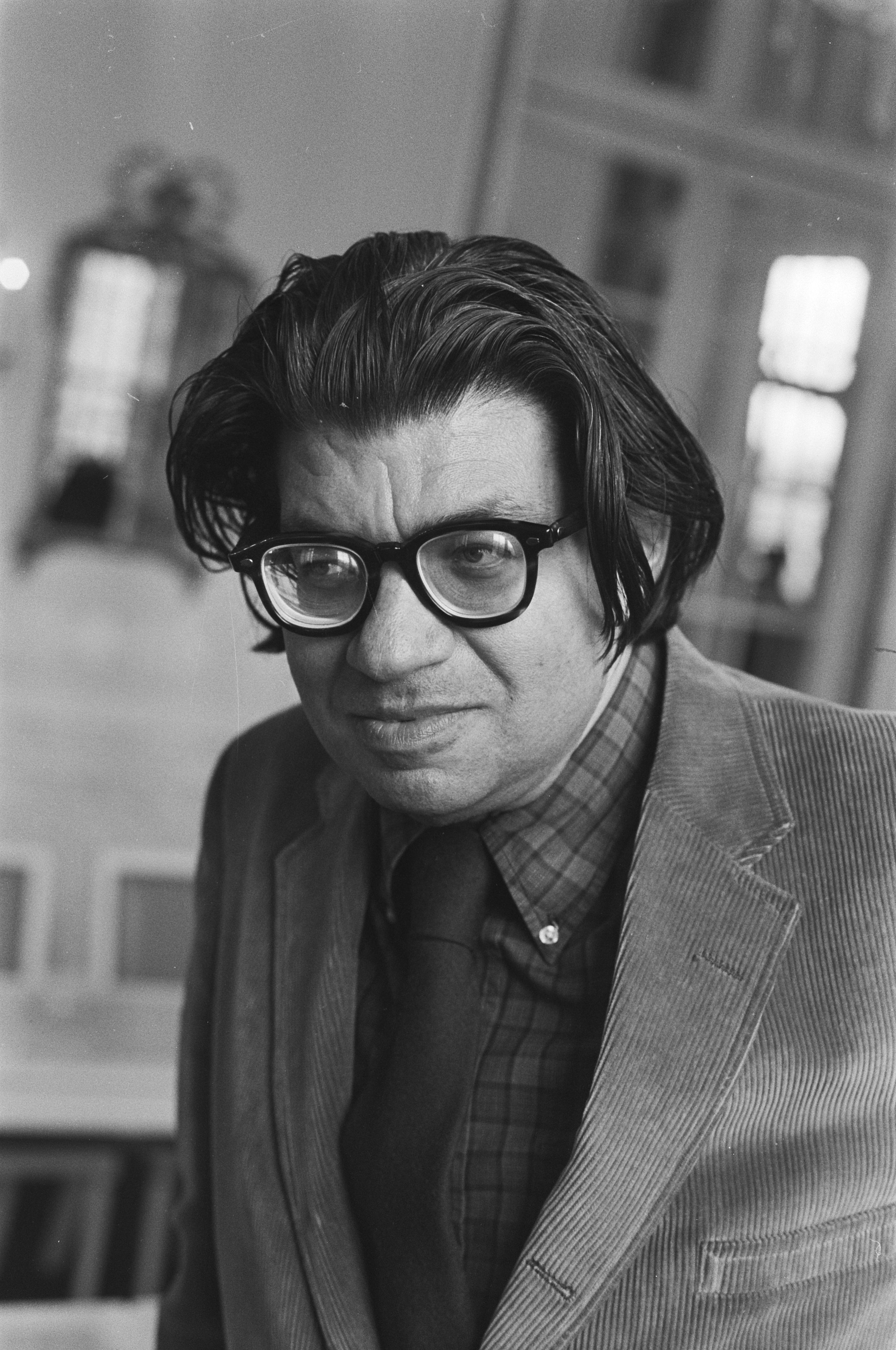
- The composer in 1976
- Librettist: Samuel Beckett
- Language: English
- Premiere: 1977

Neither is the only opera by Morton Feldman, dating from 1977. Its libretto is a 16-line poem by Samuel Beckett. Composer and librettist had met in Berlin two years earlier with plans for a collaboration for Rome Opera. However, Beckett told Feldman that he himself did not like opera. Feldman had echoed Beckett’s sentiment, so that the work emerged in Rome as a setting for soprano soloist only, accompanied by orchestra.

== Recordings ==
- HatHut, hat (now) ART 180: Sarah Leonard, soprano; Radio-Sinfonie-Orchester Frankfurt; Zoltán Peskó, conductor
- Col Legno, WWE 1CD 20081: Petra Hoffman, soprano; Symphonieorchester des Bayerischen Rundfunks; Kwamé Ryan, conductor
