= Morton Feldman =

American composer (1926–1987)

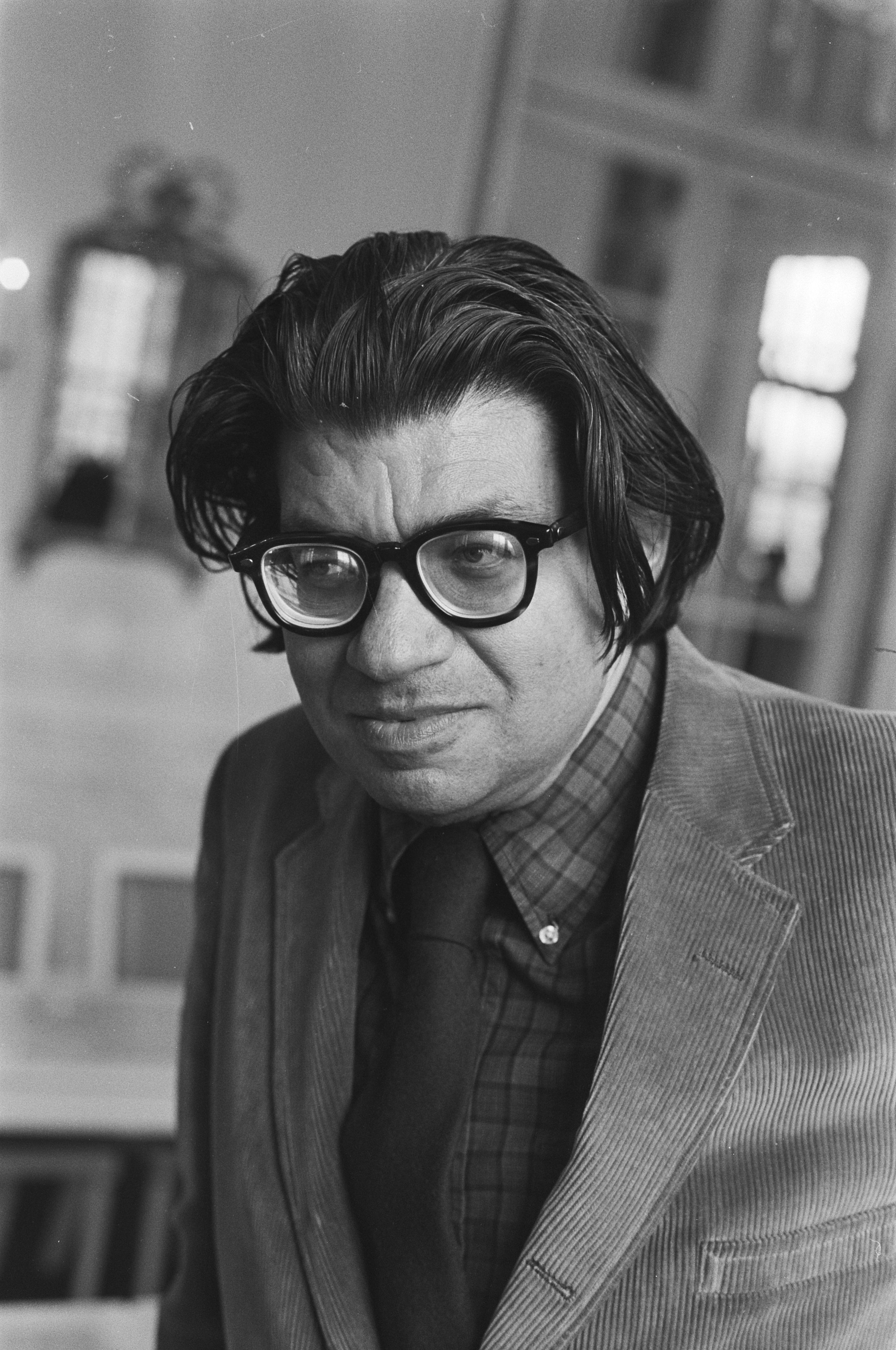
- Feldman in 1976
- Born: January 12, 1926; New York City, US
- Died: September 3, 1987 (aged 61); Buffalo, New York
- Works: List of compositions
- Spouse: Barbara Monk Feldman (m. 1987)

Morton Feldman (January 12, 1926 – September 3, 1987) was an American composer. A major figure in 20th-century classical music, Feldman was an important exponent of indeterminacy in music, a development associated with the experimental New York School of composers also including John Cage, Christian Wolff, and Earle Brown. Feldman's works are characterized by notational innovations that he developed to create his characteristic sound: rhythms that seem to be free and floating, pitch shadings that seem softly unfocused, a generally quiet and slowly evolving music, and recurring asymmetric patterns. His later works, after 1977, also explore extremes of duration.

== Biography ==
Morton Feldman was born in Woodside, Queens, New York City, on January 12, 1926. His parents, Irving and Frances Breskin Feldman, were Russian Jews who had emigrated to New York from Pereiaslav (Irving, in 1910) and Bobruysk (Frances, in 1901). His father was a manufacturer of children's coats. As a child he studied piano with Vera Maurina Press, who instilled in him a "vibrant musicality rather than musicianship". Feldman's first composition teachers were Wallingford Riegger, one of the first American followers of Arnold Schoenberg, and Stefan Wolpe, a German-born Jewish composer who had studied under Franz Schreker and Anton Webern. Feldman and Wolpe spent most of their time simply talking about music and art.

In early 1950, Feldman heard the New York Philharmonic perform Webern's Symphony. After this work, the orchestra was to perform a piece by Sergei Rachmaninoff, and Feldman left immediately, disturbed by the audience's disrespectful reaction to Webern's work. In the lobby he met John Cage, who was at the concert and had also decided to step out. The two quickly became friends, with Feldman moving into the building Cage lived in. Through Cage, he met sculptor Richard Lippold (who had a studio next door with artist Ray Johnson); artists including Sonja Sekula and Robert Rauschenberg; and composers such as Henry Cowell, Virgil Thomson, and George Antheil. An interview with Feldman was published in the first issue of 0 to 9 magazine in 1967.

With Cage's encouragement, Feldman began to write pieces that had no relation to compositional systems of the past, such as traditional tonal harmony or serialism. He experimented with nonstandard systems of musical notation, often using grids in his scores, and specifying how many notes should be played at a certain time but not which ones. Feldman's experiments with notation and indeterminacy inspired Cage to write pieces like Music of Changes, where the notes to be played are determined by consulting the I Ching.

Through Cage, Feldman met many other prominent figures in the New York arts scene, among them Jackson Pollock, Philip Guston and Frank O'Hara. He found inspiration in abstract expressionist painting, and in the 1970s wrote a number of pieces around 20 minutes in length, including Rothko Chapel (1971; written for the building of the same name, which houses paintings by Mark Rothko) and For Frank O'Hara (1973). In 1977, he wrote the opera Neither with original text by Samuel Beckett.

Feldman was commissioned to compose the score for Jack Garfein's 1961 film Something Wild, but after hearing Feldman's music for the opening scene, in which a character (played by Garfein's wife Carroll Baker) is raped, the director promptly withdrew his commission, opting to enlist Aaron Copland instead. Garfein's reaction was said to be, "My wife is being raped and you write celesta music?"

Feldman's music "changed radically" in 1970, moving away from graphic and arhythmic notation systems in favor of rhythmic precision. The first piece of this new period was a short, 55-measure work, "Madame Press Died Last Week at Ninety", dedicated to his childhood piano teacher.

In 1973, at age 47, Feldman became the Edgard Varèse Professor of Music Composition (a title of his own devising) at the University at Buffalo in Buffalo, New York; until then, he had earned his living as a full-time employee at the family textile business in Manhattan's Garment District. Feldman also held residencies at the University of California, San Diego in the 1980s.

Late in his career, Feldman produced a number of very long works, rarely shorter than half an hour and often much longer. These include Violin and String Quartet (1985, around 2 hours), For Philip Guston (1984, around four hours), and String Quartet II (1983, over six hours long without a break). These pieces typically maintain a very slow developmental pace and a very quiet dynamic range. Feldman said at the time that quiet sounds had become the only ones that interested him; in a 1982 lecture, he asked: "Do we have anything in music for example that really wipes everything out? That just cleans everything away?"

Feldman married the Canadian composer Barbara Monk shortly before his death. He died of pancreatic cancer on September 3, 1987, at his home in Buffalo.

== Works ==
See: List of compositions by Morton Feldman

== Footnotes ==
=== Sources ===
- Feldman, Morton. 1968. Give My Regards to Eighth Street, ARTnews Annual. Included in Give my regards to Eighth Street: Collected Writings of Morton Feldman (2000), The Music of Morton Feldman, and elsewhere.
- Gagne, Cole; Caras, Tracy (1982). "Interview with Morton Feldman". Soundpieces: Interviews with American Composers. Metuchen, New Jersey: Scarecrow Press. pp. 164–177.
- Hirata, Catherin (2002). "Morton Feldman". In Sitsky, Larry (ed.). Music of the Twentieth-century Avant-garde. Greenwood Publishing Group.
- Revill, David (1993). The Roaring Silence: John Cage – a Life. Arcade Publishing. ISBN 978-1-55970-220-1.
- Ross, Alex (June 19, 2006). "American Sublime". The New Yorker.
- Zimmermann, Walter, ed. (1985). Morton Feldman Essays. Kerpen: Beginner. ISBN 978-3-9800516-1-3.
