= List of Roger Woodward's principal first performances, recordings, and publications =

This article is the list of the Australian pianist Roger Woodward's, recordings and publications.

== Principal first performances ==
- WP denotes world premiere
- D denotes composer's dedication

Year	Composer	Name	Location	WP/D	Notes
1974	Alison Bauld	Concert for live and recorded voice and keyboards	Liverpool, UK	(WP)(D) (Note: Alison Bauld Concert for piano and voice – listed in Beyond Black & White Discography, item 10 – RCA (Australia) RL 1- 0083 with voice of the composer, keyboard instruments performed by Roger Woodward and descriptive article by the composer. Copy of dedicated MS in NLA. AMC ref. Library shelf no. Q 783.254/BAU 1 [Score available for loan] Woodward recording Library shelf no. CD 2418 [Available for loan])	
1973	Anne Boyd	As It Leaves The Bell Septet for four percussion, 2 harps and piano	Inaugural Sydney Opera House celebrations	(WP)(D) (Note: In Boyd's As It Leaves the Bell original score published by Faber, London; ref. AMC; copy of MS in NLA; Septet for four percussion, two harps and piano; BBW p. 455; composer's note 1995 Sydney Spring program publication p. 27 in NLA collection.)	ABC National Classic FM Radio
1974	Anne Boyd	Angklung for solo piano	Queen's Hall, Edinburgh Festival	(WP)(D)	ABC National Classic FM Radio BBC Radio 3 Recording: Boyd, Anne (1974). Anne Boyd: Angklung – Roger Woodward.
1981	Anne Boyd	The Book of Bells I for solo piano	Sydney Spring International Festival of New Music (1991)	(WP)(D) (Note: In Boyd's Book of the Bells I published by Faber & Faber London: B3 facsimile 0-571-55248-X (fp); NLA collection 1991 Sydney Spring International Festival of New Music program publication p. 35, with article by Richard Toop. Copy of MS in NLA collection)	ABC National Classic FM Radio
1996	Anne Boyd	The Book of Bells II for two pianos	Sydney Spring International Festival of New Music (1996)	(D)	ABC National Classic FM Radio (Note: In Boyd's Book of the Bells II NLA collection, 1996 Sydney Spring International Festival of New Music program publication p. 45–46 with article by Richard Toop; copy of MS in NLA collection) Premiered in the presence of the composer.
1996	Anne Boyd	Meditations On A Chinese Character for countertenor, two pianos, flute, shakuhachi, harp, cello and percussion	Sydney Spring International Festival of New Music (1996)	(WP)(D)	ABC National Classic FM Radio (Note: In Boyd's Meditations on a Chinese Character NLA Collection, 1996 Sydney Spring International Festival of New Music program publication; ABC Classics 462 007 – 2; copy of MS in NLA collection.)Premiered in the presence of the composer. Recording: Boyd, Anne (1996). Anne Boyd: Meditations on a Chinese Character – Roger Woodward.
1997	Anne Boyd	The Book of Bells III for two pianos and percussion	Sydney Spring International Festival of New Music (1997)	(WP)(D)	ABC National Classic FM Radio (Note: In Boyd's Book of the Bells III Copy of MS in NLA collection; San Francisco State University online library program publication from live Piano Week concert 14 Nov, 2008 (https://www.sfsu.edu/~news/cmemo/fall08/nov3.htm).)Premiered in the presence of the composer.
1997	Anne Boyd	Last Songs Of The Kamikaze for countertenor, 6 violins, 3 percussion, harp, piano.	Sydney Spring International Festival of New Music (1997)	(WP)(D)	Premiered in the presence of the composer. ABC National Classic FM, directed by Roger Woodward. (Note: In Boyd's Last Songs of the Kamikaze directed by Roger Woodward NLA Collection – Sydney Spring International Festival of New Music 1997, p. 54–55 with composer's statement; copy of MS in NLA collection.)
1998	Anne Boyd	Dreams For The Earth Cantata	Sydney Spring International Festival of New Music (1998)	(WP)(D)	ABC National Classic FM Radio. In the presence of the composer. (Note: Boyd Dreams for the Earth NLA Collection Composer's statement 1998 Sydney Spring International Festival of New Music program publication p. 8-9; Copy of MS in NLA)
2012	Anne Boyd	Kabarli Meditation (Dawn) for solo piano	2012 Sydney International Piano Competition	(D)	2012 Sydney International Piano Competition (Note: Boyd Kabbarii Meditation (Dawn) NLA collection, Sydney International Piano Competition commission 2012; copy of MS bearing composer's handwritten dedication (designated for NLA).)
2008	Anne Boyd	The Book of Bells IV for two piano and percussion	Knuth Hall, San Francisco State University	(WP)(D)	School of Music (SFSU) recording library
1972	Leo Brouwer	Sonata Pian' e Forte (composed 1970) keyboards, percussion, live electronics	Roundhouse, London	(WP)(D)	BBC radio 3 (Note: Brouwer Sonata Pian'e Forte original manuscript and working copy of MS in NLA; article by Richard Toop in EMI LP – EMSP 551 booklet (1973); Published by Schott Music-Digital (S9.Q295)) Recording: Brouwer, Leo (1972). Leo Brouwer: Sonata pian' e forte – Roger Woodward.
1972	John Cage	HPSCHD for 7 harpsichords and 52 computer generated tapes.	BBC Proms/International Carnival of Experimental Sound (ICES), Roundhouse, London	UK premiere	Recorded in BBC 3. Soloists: Cornelius Cardew, Richard Bernas, Roger Woodward, David Tudor, Annea Lockwood, Frederick J. Page, John Tilbury, directed by John Cage (Note: Cage HPSCHD Peters Edition; copy of MS NLA collection BBC Proms 1972 Prom 23, www.bbc.co.uk/events/emw5v2 Refer also Dave Thopson Paperback, ISBN 978-1-5440-6953-1 : 13–20 August 1972, The International Carnival of Experimental Sound, London Roundhouse taken from the book The Avant Garde Woodstock – The International Carnival of Recorded Sound)
1974	Barry Conyngham	Snowflake realized for four live and recorded keyboards	Music Rostrum Australia, Sydney Opera House (Note: Conyngham Snowflake RCA studio recording, Sydney Opera House, issued on LP -VRL – 1 – 0083 with descriptive article by the composer; published by Universal Edition UE 29082; copy of MS in NLA collection)	(WP)(D)	Recording: Conyngham, Barry (1974). Barry Conyngham: Snowflake – Roger Woodward.
1982	Barry Conyngham	Southern Cross, Double Concerto for Violin, Piano, Soloists and Orchestra	Melbourne, Australia	(WP)(D)	Wanda Wiłkomirska (violin) directed by Hiroyuki Iwaki (WP)(D) (Note: Conyngham Southern Cross, Double Concerto published by Universal Edition UE 29254; Melbourne Symphony Orchestra with soloists Wanda Wiłkomirska (violin), Roger Woodward (piano) directed by Hiroyuki Iwaki (WP)(D); ABC Classics 481 1322; copy of MS in NLA collection; Sydney Opera House live concert performance with Sydney Symphony Orchestra directed by Niklaus Wyss recorded by ABC and first issued in 1986, by EMI (His Master's Voice) OASD 27 0403 and in 2014, by ABC Classics/Universal 4811322, item 75 NLA collection.)Premiered in the presence of the composer. Recording: Conynghan, Barry (1982). Barry Conyngham: Southern Cross: Double Concerto for Violin Piano and Orchestra – Roger Woodward.
1992	Chris Dench	Planetary Allegiances for flute and chamber orchestra	BBC 2 Television, London	(WP) Dedicated to Laura Chislett	Alpha Centauri Chamber Ensemble directed by Roger Woodward, Sydney Spring International Festival of New Music III, ABC National Classic FM Radio, Grateful Dead/Rex Foundation (Note: Dench Planetary Allegiances recorded for BBC2TV, London; Grateful Dead/Rex Foundation (Dec. 1992); NLA Collection Composer's statement 1992 Sydney Spring International Festival of New Music program publication p. 15; copy of MS in NLA.)Premiered in the presence of the composer.
1997	James Dillon	The Book Of Elements (Vol. 1) for solo piano	Queen Elizabeth Hall, South Bank, London.	(WP)(D)	Premiered in the presence of the composer. (Note: Dillon The Book of Elements NLA Collection Composer's statement 1997 Sydney Spring International Festival of New Music program publication p. 30 and in Edition Peters No. 7488 introduction: "The five volumes began with a commission from Roger Woodward and the Sydney Spring International Festival of New Music in 1997 and collectively they are dedicated with respect and admiration to his restless creativity." MS bearing composer's dedication and photograph with the composer taken at world premiere. Copy of MS in NLA collection.)
1992	Franco Donatoni	Sincronie 92, Piano with cello accompaniment	Huddersfield International Festival of New Music.	(WP)	Live concert performance in the presence of the composer. (Note: Donatoni Sincronie 92 The Nuovo Sincronie 92 Sipario Dischi sin 1012 live concert performance broadcast BBC Radio 3; published by Ricordi (Milano)136027. , item 40. Copy of MS in NLA Collection .) Jacopo Scalfi (cello), Roger Woodward (piano). BBC Radio 3. Recording: Donatoni, Franco (1992). Franco Donatoni: Sincronie – Roger Woodward.
1971	Ross Edwards	Monos II for solo piano	Queen Elizabeth Hall, South Bank, London (Note: Edwards Monos II copy of MS in NLA Collection; EMI LP-OASD 7567 with article by the Australian playwright Meredith Oakes)	(WP)(D)	Recording: Ross, Edwards (1971). Ross Edwards: Monos II – Roger Woodward. In the presence of the composer.
1972	Ross Edwards	Choros for piano and chamber orchestra		(D) (Note: Edwards Choros Copy of MS in NLA Collection)	
1975	Morton Feldman	Piano and Orchestra	Metz Festival	(WP)(D)	Premiered in the presence of the composer. Live concert performance in the presence of the composer. Roger Woodward (piano) and Saarbrücken Rundfunk sinfonieorchester, directed by Hans Zender. (Note: Feldman Piano and Orchestra UE 16076; Rundfunk sinfonieorchester, Saarbrücken directed by Hans Zender; Saarländischer Rundfunk CD recording 61203 94832; CPO 999 483–2;) Recording: Feldman, Morton (1975). Morton Feldman: Piano and Orchestra – Roger Woodward.
1977	Morton Feldman	Piano	Südwestrundfunk Baden-Baden (Note: Feldman Piano NLA Collection Sydney Spring International Festival of New Music programme note by Richard Toop, p. 24–26; Baden-Badenrundfunk Concert Hall 1977; UE Morton Feldman catalogue 16516 reproduced and printed by Halstan & Co., Amersham, Bucks., England; Etcetera Records BV (Amsterdam); *Record of the Month, Telerama (April,1991); Diapason d'Or, Paris, Le monde de la musique June, 1991; copy of MS in NLA Collection;)	(WP)(D)	Recording: Feldman, Morton (1977). Morton Feldman: Piano – Roger Woodward.
1981	Morton Feldman	Triadic Memories for solo piano	MusiCA concert series, Institute of Contemporary Art (ICA) London. (Note: Feldman Triadic Memories UE 17326; Etcetera Records BV (Amsterdam); Record of the Month, Telerama (April,1991); Diapason d'Or, Paris, Le monde de la musique June, 1991; NLA Collection 1990 article for Sydney Spring International Festival of New Music programme by Richard Toop, p. 24–26; Festival d'automne à Paris October 28, 1997, Théâtre Molière; Article by Renaud Machart, Le Monde, October 31, 1997 Les griffures du silence de Morton Feldman; article by Morton Feldman in Give My Regards to Eighth Street – Collected Writings of Morton Feldman published by Exact Change, Cambridge, USA, 2000, ISBN 1-878972-31-6. Chapter "Triadic Memories" (March 1982) p. 152–156; article published by Eric Dahan in Le Monde, 28 October 1997, in the Culture section, entitled: "A l'échelle de Morton Feldman". copy of MS in NLA collection.)	(WP) (D-shared with Aki Takahashi)	Premiered in the presence of the composer. Recording: Feldman, Morton (1981). Morton Feldman: Triadic Memories – Roger Woodward.
1978	Rolf Gehlhaar	Strangeness, Charm and Colour for two trumpets, trombone and piano	Queen Elizabeth Hall, South Bank, London (Note: Gehlhaar Strangeness, Charm and Colour. Athens premiere performance published in the 52nd ISCM Festival programme; www.gehlhaar.org/music/works; Copy of MS in NLA Collection.)	(WP)(D)	Premiered by Roger Woodward and London Brass. In the presence of the composer.
1989	Rolf Gehlhaar	Diagonal Flying for live keyboards, percussion and Sound = Space (synthesizer)	Extasis Festival, Geneva	(WP)(D)	Live concert performance by the composer and Roger Woodward recorded by ABC National Classic FM Radio, 1990, Art Gallery of NSW, Sydney, Australia for the Sydney Spring International Festival of New Music. (Note: Gehlhaar Diagonal Flying NLA Collection Composer's statement 1990 Sydney Spring International Festival of New Music programme publication p. 42.; UTREM Rolf Gehlhaar/Spotify; www.gehlhaar.org/music/works; copy of MS in NLA Collection; photograph with composer enroute Geneva for the world premiere of Diagonal Flying adjacent.) Recording: Gehlhaar, Rolf (1989). Rolf Gehlhaar : Diagonal Flying – Roger Woodward.
1994	Rolf Gehlhaar	Quantum Leap for solo piano (Note: In Gehlhaar Quantum Leap www.gehlhaar.org/music/works; copy of MS in NLA Collection)		(D)	
2012	Robert Greenberg	Invasive Species for piano quintet	Knuth Hall at San Francisco State University	(WP)(D)	With Alexander String Quartet. (Note: In Greenberg Invasive Species; copy of MS in NLA Collection)Premiered in the presence of the composer. Recording: Greenberg, Robert (2012). Robert Greenberg: Invasive Species- Alexander String Quartet with Roger Woodward.
2007	Peter Michael Hamel	Vom Klang des Lebens (Etudes for solo piano)	Gasteig, Munich	(WP)(D) (Note: In Hamel Vom Klang des Lebens (Etudes for solo piano) www.musicweb-international.com › classrev › Mar10 › Hamel_132562. Copy of MS in NLA Collection)	Recorded by Celestial Harmonies Premiered in the presence of the composer. Recording: Hamel, Peter Michael (2007). Peter Michael Hamel: Vom Klang des Lebens – Roger Woodward.
1987	Áskell Masson	Piano Concerto	Reykjaviik, Iceland	(WP)(D)	Premiered with the Iceland Symphony Orchestra, directed by Diego Masson, 1987, recorded by Radio Iceland. (Note: In Masson, Askell Piano Concerto www.askellmasson.com/works/solo-with-orchestra/; Copy of MS in NLA Collection)Premiered in the presence of the composer. Recording: Másson, Áskell (1985). Áskell Másson: Piano Concerto – Roger Woodward.
1971	Richard Meale	Coruscations for solo piano	Queen Elizabeth Hall, South Bank, London (Note: In Meale Coruscations, EMI–LP OASD 7567 with notes by Meredith Oakes;RCA–LP RL 1–0083; . (with notes by Meredith Oakes))	(WP)(D)	Recording: Meale, Richard (1971). Richard Meale: Coruscations – Roger Woodward.
1976–2007	Richard Meale	Piano Concerto		(D) (Note: In Meale Piano Concerto sketches 1975–2007; copy of MS in NLA)	Sketches at the NLA Collection
1965	Richard Meale	Orenda for solo piano	Sydney Conservatorium of Music	(WP)(D)	In the presence of the composer
1992–1999	Horațiu Rădulescu	Piano Sonata No. 3 "...you will endure forever..."	Lucero Festival, Versailles	(D) (Note: In Radulescu Piano Sonata No. 3 – you will endure forever; copy of MS in NLA)	In the presence of the composer.
1995	Horațiu Rădulescu	Piano Sonata no. 4, Op. 92 "like a well...older than God" (1993)	Sydney Spring International Festival of New Music	Australian premiere	AP Sydney Spring (Note: In Radulescu Piano Sonata No. 3 – you will endure forever; copy of MS in NLA)
1972	Bernard Rands	Mésallianz for piano and orchestra	Roundhouse, London, UK	(WP)(D)	Commissioned by BBC Symphony Orchestra; BBCSO directed by Pierre Boulez, BBC Radio 3 (Note: In Rands Mésallianz published by the Schott Helicon Music Corporation; BBC Radio 3 recording of live performance; Michael Chanan film documentary with Allied Artists involving performance preparation with Meredith Oakes and live concert performance; copy of MS in NLA Collection. "Mésalliance is indeed more than a piano concerto. In this compelling and impressive work, ideas are carried through brilliantly." – Melos, Germany. "Mésalliance is a sort of mad concerto. It ends on a fantastic cadenza which threatened to (and did) bring the house down." – The Guardian, London; http://bernardrands.com/mesalliance.html)Recording: Rands, Bernard (1972. Mésallianz "The Politics of Music" Michael Chanan Productions, BBC2, interview with Pierre Boulez, Roger Woodward at rehearsal with BBCSO for BBC Roundhouse world premiere of Bernard Rands "Mésallianz" for piano and chamber orchestra. (Note: DVD of rehearsal with Boulez and Bernard Rands) http://vimeo.com/13799532 In the presence of the composer.
1970	Peter Sculthorpe	Snow Moon and Flowers for solo piano	EMI studios, Abbey Road, London	(WP)	Version for piano strings (Note: In Sculthorpe Snow Moon and Flowers The three separate pieces recorded in EMI Abbey Road studios London in 1971 and released on an LP OASD 7567 together with article by Michael Chanan (who subsequently recorded the pieces on the piano keyboard). Following the Woodward recording release the composer retitled the three pieces Night, although a separate piece of the same name had already been recorded at the same EMI recording sessions. Copy of MS in NLA Collection.) Recording: Sculthorpe, Peter (1970). Peter Sculthorpe: Snow, Moon and Flowers – Roger Woodward.
1970	Peter Sculthorpe	Night for solo piano	EMI studios, Abbey Road, London	(WP)(D)	Version for piano strings (Note: In Sculthorpe Night version performed solely on the piano strings; recorded EMI studios, Abbey Road, London LP OASD 7567and – (WP)(D); copy of MS in NLA Collection.)Recording: Sculthorpe, Peter (1970). Peter Sculthorpe: Night – Roger Woodward.
1970	Peter Sculthorpe	Landscape for solo piano	EMI studios, Abbey Road, London	(WP)(D)	Version with feedback (Note: In Sculthorpe Landscape version with feedback, EMI studios, Abbey Road, London, notes by Michael Chanan(WP)(D); copy of MS in NLA Collection.)
1973	Peter Sculthorpe	Koto Music for solo piano	EMI studios, Abbey Road, London	(W)1974(D)1973 (Note: Sculthorpe Koto Music Composer's dedication on the cover of RCA VRL 1 0083 Long play, vinyl, recording, 1974; RCA LP VRL 1 0083, 1974 with article and dedication by the composer; copy of MS in NLA Collection;)	Version for piano strings Recording: Sculthorpe, Peter (1973). Peter Sculthorpe: Koto Music – Roger Woodward.
1990–1994	Larry Sitsky	Piano Concerto no. 1 (Twenty-two Paths of the Tarot)	Sydney Spring International Festival of New Music	(WP) 1994(D)	ABC National Classic FM Radio (Note: Sitsky Piano Concerto No. 1 (The Twenty-two Paths of the Tarot) published by the Australian Music Centre; in the NLA Collection : world premiere 1995 Sydney Spring International Festival of New Music; Hunter Orchestra directed by Roland Peelman; dedicated copy of MS in NLA Collection; UNESCO citation, 1995 Paris Composer's Rostrum Ref. 2. In 1997, ABC Classics rerecorded and issued the work – 456 688–2 – with Woodward and the Adelaide Symphony Orchestra directed by David Porcelijn;)Premiered in the presence of the composer. Recording: Sitsky, Larry (1994). Larry Sitsky: Piano Concerto No. 1: The Twenty-Two Paths of the Tarot – Roger Woodward.
2020	Larry Sitsky	Piano Concerto no.3 (without orchestra) "Apocryphon"		(D)	
1969	Karlheinz Stockhausen	Intervall from Für Kommende Zeiten	Royal Festival Hall, London	(WP) 1972	Work for piano duet (four hands), premiered with Jerzy Romaniuk, with Stockhausen participating in the premiere performance, using electroacoustic equipment.
1996	Qu Xiao-Song	Huan for piano and orchestra	Sydney Spring International Festival of New Music (1996)	Australian Premiere	Roger Woodward (piano) and Australian Youth Orchestra directed by Diego Masson, composed in 1987 ABC Naonal Classic FM Radio Recording: Qu, Xiao-Song (1996). Qu Xiao-Song: Huan – Roger Woodward.
1985	Qu Xiao-Song	Peace for solo piano	London	(WP)(D) (Note: In Xu Peace Copy of MS designated for NLA Collection)	At the NLA Collection
1952–59	Tōru Takemitsu	Undisturbed Rest on a poem by Shūzo Takigūchi for solo piano	Canberra	(D) personal dedication, Sydney, 1969. (Note: In Takemitsu Undisturbed Rest personal dedication, Sydney, 1969; copy of MS in NLA Collection; London Music Digest (WP)(D) BBW p. 322–333 and p. 538, item 13: Decca Headline Series, London HEAD 4 in the presence of the composer, recorded in 1973 and issued 1974; AllMusic Reviews – Uncle Dave Lewis – allmusic.com/album/takemitsu-Corona-for away; refer also to : theblues-thatjazz.com/en/classical/4782-takemitsu-toru/17838-takemitsu-corona-for-away-piano-distance-undisturbed-rest-1974.pdf; Ritmo prize, Spain; Record of the Month, January, 1991, Télérama, Paris ... Roger Woodward est épatant. Enregistrement essential...; MS copy in NLA Collection)	In the presence of the composer.
1973	Tōru Takemitsu	For Away for solo piano	Roundhouse, London Music Digest	(WP)(D)	Premiered in the presence of the composer, BBC Radio 3 (Note: In Takemitsu For Away Decca Headline Series, London HEAD 4 in the presence of the composer, recorded in 1973 and issued 1974; AllMusic Reviews – Uncle Dave Lewis – allmusic.com/album/takemitsu-Corona-for away; the blues-thatjazz.com/en/classical/4782-takemitsu-toru/ Etcetera Records BV Amsterdam 1991 – Ritmo prize, Spain; Record of the Month, January, 1991, Télérama, Paris ... Roger Woodward est épatant. Enregistrement essential...; NLA Collection – 1990 Sydney Spring International Festival of New Music programme publication article by Richard Toop, p. 17 and composer's note: "To be sure, the title of For Away is a strange one. While it is a personal gift of mine to Roger Woodward, it is at the same time my expression of extolment and offering to the Galaxy of Life – a galaxy that is not the sole domain of mankind. Toru Takemitsu"; MS copy in NLA Collection.) Recording: Woodward, Roger (1973). Toru Takemitsu: For Away. In the presence of the composer.
1973	Tōru Takemitsu	Corona (London Version) for piano	Roundhouse London Music Digest	(WP) (D)	Premiered in the presence of the composer with participation of the composer for the Decca recording. The two piano pieces (Corona and Crossing) were combined at the request of the composer at the Decca Studios, London. The composer participated in and entitled his new creation: Corona-London Version (Note: In Takemitsu Crossing and Corona – London Version. Only three people participated in these studio sessions: James Mallinson (producer), Toru Takemitsu and Roger Woodward. The work was re-envisaged at the First Sydney Spring International Festival of New Music and re-recorded September 16, 1990, at the Art Gallery of NSW in a live concert programme of works by Conyngham, Takemitsu and Gehlhaar in which composer/performer Rolf Gehlhaar added intermittent bowed cymbal sounds to Takemitsu's Corona-London version. The recording was issued the following year by Etcetera Records BV (Amsterdam) as KTC 1103 and is the sole occasion when such additions were made involving another artist. MS copy in NLA Collection;); Recording: Woodward, Roger (1973). Toru Takemitsu: Corona – London Version.
1969	Felix Werder	Piano Sonata No. 3	ABC Studios Sydney	(WP)(D)	Recorded for ABC Classics (NLA-MS-SAV005973) (Note: In Werder Piano Sonata No. 3 ABC LP recorded 1969. On the other side of the same LP: Werder Unaccompanied Violin Sonata performed by György Pauk. AMC ref. NLA-MS-SAV005973 1.)
1970	Roger Woodward	Music of Change for solo piano and optional percussion	Gaudeamus Festival, Rotterdarm, The Netherlands	(WP) (Note: In Woodward Music of Change MS in NLA Collection)	
1989	Roger Woodward	Sound by Sound for live and recorded keyboards	Festival d'automne à Paris	(WP)	Commissioned for the bicentennial celebrations of the French Revolution, recorded by Radio France and ABC National Classic FM Radio, at 1990 Sydney Spring International Festival of New Music (Note: In Woodward Sound by Sound Festival d'automne à Paris commission for the bicentennial celebrations of the French Revolution (WP) as part of programme with Takemitsu, Brouwer, Woodward, Debussy www.festival-automne.com/edition-1989; NLA Collection : Australian premiere 1990 Sydney Spring International Festival of New Music p. 20; note by Richard Toop and composer's note p. 20; ABC Classics broadcast recording repeated at Tenth Almeida Festival, June 1990, London; 1989 Festival d'automne à Paris programme booklet. MS in NLA Collection(Class 1, Series Video Recordings, NLA.MS-SAV005953).) Recording: Woodward, Roger (1989). Roger Woodward: Sound by Sound.
1991	Roger Woodward	...from the Confessions No. 5 (Music Theatre)	Sydney Spring International Festival of New Music (1991), NSW Art Gallery	(WP)	Roger Woodward and Robyn Archer. Dedicated to Andrey Tarkovsky, ABC National Classic FM Radio (Note: In Woodward ... from the Andrai Tarkovsky Diaries NLA Collection – Sydney Spring International Festival of New Music(WP) at the Art Gallery of NSW, with Robyn Archer. ABC National Classic FM recording. MS in NLA Collection)
1996	Roger Woodward	Five Songs In Memoriam Toru Takemitsu for Unaccompanied Violoncello	Sydney Spring International Festival of New Music (1996)	(WP)	Live concert performance by Nathan Waks, ABC National Classic FM Radio (Note: In Woodward Five Songs in Memoriam Toru Takemitsu: NLA Collection – Sydney Spring International Festival of New Music (WP) performed by Nathan Waks; MS in NLA Collection;)Premiered in the presence of the composer. Recording: Woodward, Roger (1996). Roger Woodward: Five Songs in Memoriam Toru Takemitsu(Nathan Waks, cello).
1980	Iannis Xenakis	Mists for solo piano (composed 1980)	Premiered in Edinburgh 1981, then London ICA series (Note: In Xenakis Mists published by Salabert (Universal). NLA Collection – Composer's note 1982 Sydney Spring International Festival of New Music programme publication p. 45. Copy of MS in NLA Collection; Bruno Monsaingeon: (Sviatoslav) Richter Ecrits, Conversations, 1998, Éditions Van de Velde/Actes Sud / Arte Éditions, ISBN 2 85868 255 0, ISBN 2 7427 1981 4, p. 341–342: "Mists: C'est la première fois que j'entends de la musique de Xenakis; je suis sidéré, même si je ne suis pas certain d'avoir vraiment (ou même vraimnent pas) compris cette musique. L'intuition? Mais peut-on toujours s'y fier? ...Il me semble que voilà effectivement de la vrai 'nouvelle' musique;")	(WP)(D)	Premiered in the presence of the composer Recording: Xenakis, Iannis (1980). Iannis Xenakis: Mists.
1986	Iannis Xenakis	Keqrops for piano and orchestra	Lincoln Center, New York,	(WP)(D)	Premiered in the presence of the composer by Roger Woodward (piano) and the New York Philharmonic Orchestra directed by Zubin Mehta (Note: In Xenakis Keqrops NLA Collection : Eric Anther interview with Xenakis Le monde de la musique, Paris, December, 1986: Mi homme-mi dragon; Andrew Porter, The New Yorker, 1986, "...fingers and nerves of steel"; monograph: Conquering Goliath: Preparing and Performing Xenakis 'Keqrops' for Performing Xenakis, edited by Sharon Kanach, Pendragon Press, New York; copy of MS in NLA Collection;)
1992	Iannis Xenakis	Paille In The Wind for piano and cello	La Scala, Milano	(WP)(D)	Jacopo Scalfi (cello) and Roger Woodward (piano) (Note: In Xenakis Paille in The Wind recorded by ABC National Classic FM with Nathan Waks, violoncello and Roger Woodward at the Sydney Spring International Festival of New Music, 2000; copy of MS in NLA Collection.)

== Publications ==
=== Publications I: Original ===
Year of issue	Title	Publisher	Notes
1972	"Krzysztof Penderecki"	Hansom Books Press	For Music & Musicians, London
1998	Music and Change: Some Considerations of Beethoven's Sonata quasi una Fantasia in C sharp minor Op 27 no 2 (Moonlight)	University of Sydney	In Literature and Aesthetics, vol. 8, journal of the Sydney Society of Literature and Aesthetics, ISSN 1036-9368
2001	Jean Barraqué	University of Sydney	In Matters of the Mind. Editors Jobling, Lee & Runcie, Catherine ISBN 1-86487-362-0
2002	Preparation for Xenakis and 'Keqrops'	Routledge	Monograph for Xenakis Studies: In Memoriam in Contemporary Music Review, vol. 21, nos. 2/3, pp. 109–120, edited by James Harley and Peter Nelson, UK
2002	Jean Barraqué-Lyric Genius	Greenwood Press	For Music of the Twentieth-Century Avant-Garde – A Biocritical Sourcebook edited by Larry Sitsky, New York, ISBN 0-313-29689-8
2005	Sitsky's Keyboard Music: Si Yeoo Ki	Praeger	Extended monograph for Australian Piano Music of The Twentieth Century, USA, ISBN 978-0-313-32286-0
2010	Conquering Goliath: Preparing and Performing Xenakis' Keqrops	Pendragon Press	Monograph for Performing Xenakis in The Iannis Xenakis Series No. 2, edited by Sharon Kanach, New York, ISBN 978-1-57647-191-3
2012	Two Cadenzas: 1. for the Allegro maestoso of Mozart's Piano Concerto No. 25 in C major, KV 503. 2. For the Allegro con brio of Beethoven’s Piano Concerto No. 1 in C major, Op. 15	ERP Musikverlag	Completion of the composer's "incomplete" cadenza, Berlin, M-700252434
2014	Beyond Black And White – My Life in Music	HarperCollins	Autobiography, Sydney, ISBN 978-0-7333-2303-4
2006–2014	Cover notes for Celestial Harmonies' recordings of: J. S. Bach, Beethoven, Chopin, Prokofiev, Shostakovich Experimental Silver-Age and Early-Soviet composers.	Celestial Harmonies	

=== Publications II: DVD performances ===
Year of issue	Title	Repertoire	Publisher	Notes
1972	"The Politics of Music"	Excerpts of Mésallianz	Michael Chanan Productions	Film by Michael Chanan, interview with Pierre Boulez, Roger Woodward at rehearsal with BBCSO for BBC Roundhouse world premiere of Bernard Rands' Mésallianz for piano and chamber orchestra. http://vimeo.com/13799532
1972	HPSCHD	Cage's HPSCHD	BBC	Cage's HPSCHD International Carnival of Experimental Sound (ICES) and BBC Proms 23 with Cornelius Cardew, Richard Bernas, Roger Woodward, David Tudor, Annea Lockwood, Frederick J. Page, John Tilbury, directed by John Cage, at the London Roundhouse.
1973	Stockhausen's Mantra		Allied Artists	Stockhausen's Mantra for two ring-modulated pianos–Stockhausen London lectures. Seventh Series/Jerzy Romaniuk/Roger Woodward/Allied Artists/London
1982	Double concerto: a film about the pianist Roger Woodward	Southern Cross, Double Concerto for Violin, Piano, Soloists and Orchestra	Sydney Angela Carterns (Producer) Hugh Piper (Director)	Woodward and Wanda Wilkomirska. Together they play the double concerto "Southern Cross", a concerto written especially for them by Australia's most internationally acclaimed composer, Barry Conyingham. The film follows Roger and Wanda in rehearsal, in concert and in rambling walks along the sea shores. They discuss their music, their politics and their personal lives.
1983	Beethoven Sonatas	Beethoven Sonatas Opp. 13, 27/2, 31/2, 57 (encore Chopin Waltz Op. 18)	Sydney Opera House/Yoho Productions distributed by Polydor	Live DVD/Tenth Anniversary, Sydney Opera House. (Note: Music Video 041 103 2. State Library of New South Wales, Australia, Shelf VB 2637.)
1986	Alexander Goehr's piano works	Alexander Goehr's piano works	BBC radio 3	BBC radio 3 recording
1988	Keqrops	Xenakis' Keqrops	Polish Radio and Television	Live performance with the Silesian Philharmonic Orchestra, Katowice, directed by Karol Stryja at the opening concert XXXI Warszawska Jesień in the National Philharmonic Hall, Warsaw
1990	Tchaikovsky's 150th Anniversary Concert in China	Tchaikovsky Piano Concerto no. 1, Op. 23	Kultur	With the Central Philharmonic Symphony Orchestra Beijing, directed by Tan Lihua. (Note: Live DVD celebrating 150 years of Tchaikovsky's birth. Kultur. Item no. D 14302–2.4000.)
1990	Kraanerg	Xenakis' Kraanerg	ABC TV	Live performance with the Sydney Dance Company, directed by Graeme Murphy. An ABC television documentary
1991	Something Rich And Strange		BBC/Calliope Media	Xenakis BBC Television Documentary
1992	Planetary Allegiances	Dench's Planetary Allegiances	BBC2 TV/Grateful Dead/Rex Foundation.	Flute concerto – Laura Chislett, soloist/Alpha Centauri/Woodward
1992	Huddersfield International Festival of New Music	Works by Cage, Xenakis and Donatoni	BBC Radio 3	Alpha Centauri/Woodward
1992	Blue Roses	Works by Percy Grainger		DVD
1992	Woodward Fiftieth Birthday Celebration	Works by Fryderyk Chopin	Sydney Opera House/TCN Channel 9	Sydney Opera House/TCN Channel 9 Sunday television documentary (Australia)
1997	The Seventh Spring	Works by Arvo Pärt, Anne Boyd, excerpts from Schoenberg's Piano Concerto, including excerpts Chopin Etudes Op. 25	Smith Street Films	Sydney Symphony Orchestra directed by Edo de Waart and Sydney Opera House recital
1999	Skryabin performances for Noosa Film Festival			
1999	Australian Story		ABC TV	ABC TV documentary (Class 1, Series DVD Recordings, NLA.MS-DM000748)
2020		Debussy's Préludes Book 2, Chopin Mazurkas	Melbourne Digital Concert Hall	

=== Publications III: Long play/vinyl and compact disc recordings ===
Year of recording	Year of release	Company	Recording Location	Title	Composer	Content	Notes
1970	1970	EMI OASD 7562	Abbey Road, London	Skryabin Prokofiev Shostakovich	A. Skryabin, S. Prokofiev, D. Shostakovich	Skryabin: Sonata no. 10, Op. 70, Etudes: Op. 2 no. 1 and Op. 8 no. 11 / Prokofiev: Sonata no. 7, Op. 83/ Shostakovich: Prelude and Fugue Op. 87 no. 15.	Long play, vinyl
1969	1969	ABC Classics	Australia	Felix Werder and György Pauk	F. Werder	Piano Sonata no. 3	Long play, vinyl, recorded together with Werder Unaccompanied Violin Sonata performed by György Pauk
1970	1970	EMI OASD 7560	EMI Abbey Road Studios, London	Chopin Piano Works	F. Chopin	Twelve Etudes Op 10, Nocturne Op. 27, No. 2, Polonaise Fantaisie Op 61	Long play, vinyl
1970	1970	EMI OASD 7561	Abbey Road, London	Rakhmaninov Preludes	S. Rakhmaninov	Ten Preludes: Op. 3 no. 2, Op. 23, nos. 1, 4, 5, 7 and Op. 32, nos. 2, 6, 9, 10, 12	Re-release on compact disc, 1989, CDC 749967
1970	1971	EMI OASD 7567	Abbey Road, London.	Australian Contemporary Music	R. Meale, R. Edwards, P. Sculthorpe	Meale: Orenda, Meale Coruscations, Edwards: Monos II, Sculthorpe Snow, Moon, Flowers (piano strings) and Landscape	Long play, vinyl
1972	1973	EMI HQS 1303	Abbey Road, London	Roger Woodward plays Chopin	F. Chopin	Allegro de Concert Op. 46, Barcarolle Op. 60, Four Mazurkas Op. 68 (posth.), Polonaise in F sharp minor, Op. 44	Long play, vinyl
1972	1973	EMI EMSP 551	Abbey Road, London	The London Music Digest from the Round House	J. Barraqué, S. Bussotti, L. Brouwer	Jean Barraqué Sonate pour piano, Sylvano Bussotti Pour Clavier, Per Tre/ Leo Brouwer Sonate Pian é forte	Recorded in the presence of Jean Barraqué. Long play, vinyl
1972	2014	Celestial Harmonies 1335–2	EMI Abbey Road Studios, London, UK	Jean Barraqué Sonate pour piano	Jean Barraqu	Sonate pour piano	Original LP recording in EMI Abbey Road Studios. Recorded in presence of the composer. Re-released by Celestial Harmonies. Executive producer Eckart Rahn.
1973	1974	DECCA HEAD4		Takemitsu Piano Works	T. Takemitsu	Uninterrupted Rests on a poem by Shūzo Takigūchi, Piano Distance, For Away. Corona and Crossing (were combined by the composer to form a new work entitled Corona – London Version).	Multiple re-releases on a wide number of recording labels including (Japan) POCL 2347 (re-release of POCL 3998 and UCCD 3131).
1974	1974	RCA Red Seal LRL 1 5016		Beethoven Symphony No. 3 (Eroica)	L. v. Beethoven	Piano transcription of Beethoven's Symphony No. 3	Long-play, Vinyl.
1974	1975	SMX-44977-44980.	Sydney Opera House concert	Concert for Darwin	F. Chopin	Polonaise in F sharp minor, Op. 44	Compilation of sound tracks and multiple artists constituting a live Sydney Opera House concert (December, 1974). Long-play Vinyl. Includes the Chopin Polonaise in F sharp minor, Op. 44.
1974	1975	RCA Red Seal RL 1 5016		Beethoven Sonatas	L. v. Beethoven	Beethoven Sonata Op. 57 and Sonata Op. 111	Long Play
1974	1974	RCA RL 1–0083.		Australian Contemporary Music	R. Meale, A. Boyd, P. Sculthorpe, A. Bauld, B. Conyngham	R. Meale:Orenda and Coruscations A. Boyd: Angklung P. Sculthorpe: Koto Music A. Bauld: Snowflake B. Conyngham: Concert	Long Play
1975	1991	Col Legno 010165318317.	Munich	20 Ans de musique contemporaine à Metz	M. Feldman	Piano and orchestra	Release of Morton Feldman Piano and orchestra (1975) with Gehlhaar Phase and Taira Radiance. Compact disc. Re-released by CPO (1999)
1975	2009	Celestial Harmonies 14302-2	United Kingdom	Dmitry Shostakovich – 24 Preludes and Fugues Op. 87	Dmitry Shostakovich	24 Preludes and Fugues Op. 87	First complete recorded performance in the West. Recorded for RCA in 1975.Long-play (2), Vinyl; RCA Red Seal LRL 2 5100. Released on compact disc in 2010 by Celestial Harmonies 14302-2
1976	1976	Radio Japan			Sessu Kai/ Takahashi	Chromomorphe II and other piano pieces	Incomplete project, Music Today Festival. Produced by Yuji Takahashi in the DG studios( Tokyo)
1976	1976	Polskie Nagrania SX 1444.	Warsaw Autumn International Festival of Contemporary Music.	Serocki – Fantasmagoria	K. Serocki	Fantasmagoria	Work for piano and percussion. Live performance from XX Warsaw Autumn International Festival of Contemporary Music. Long-play, Vinyl.
1976	1976	RCA Red Seal LRL 1 5097		Beethoven Sonatas	L. v. Beethoven	Beethoven Sonata Op 2 no 3, Sonata Op. 49, no. 2; Sonata Op. 27, no. 2	Long play
1976	1976	RCA Red Seal RL 25082		Alun Hoddinott – Piano Concerto no. 3	A. Hoddinott	Piano Concerto no. 3 Op. 44	Philharmonia Orchestra, London, directed by Hans-Hubert Schönzeler. Long-play, Vinyl.
1976	1976	RCA Red Seal RL 25031		Brahms Piano Concerto No. 1 in D minor	J. Brahms	Piano Concerto no. 1 in D Minor, Op. 15	Philharmonia Orchestra, London, directed by Kurt Masur. Long-play, Vinyl
1978	1979	RCA Red Seal RL 25224.		Shostakovich Second Piano Trio and Piano Quintet	D. Shostakovich	Piano Trio no. 2, Op. 67 and Piano Quintet, Op. 57	Edinburgh String Quartet. Long-play, Vinyl
1978	1978	Unicorn UNS 263		Jean Barraqué Sonate	J. Barraqué	Sonate pour piano	Recorded in the presence of the composer. Rerelease of EMI "London Music Digest" performance recorded by EMI (1972) and released (1973) as EMSP 551. Cover note by Bill Hopkins (Barraqué pupil).
1980s–2000s	2014	ABC Classics/Universal 4811322		Roger Woodward – A Concerto Collection	J. S. Bach, J. Haydn, L. v. Beethoven, F. Chopin, S. Rakhmaninov, A. Skryabin, A. Schoenberg Prokofiev, L. Sistky, Qu Xiao- Song, B. Conyngham, I. Xenakis.	J.S. Bach Concerto in D minor, BWV 1052 (live)/directed by Eivind Aadland, Joseph Haydn Concerto for Violin (Wanda Wiłkomirska) and Organ Hob. XVIII:6 (live)/directed by Niklaus Wyss, Beethoven Piano Concerto no. 3, in C minor, Op. 37 (studio)/directed by Albert Rosen, Beethoven Piano Concerto no. 4, in G major, Op. 58 (live)/directed by Georg Tintner, Chopin Piano Concerto no. 1 in E minor, Op. 11 (Sydney Opera House/studio)/directed by Werner Andreas Albert, Rakhmaninov Piano Concerto no. 2, in C minor, Op. 18 (live)/directed by Charles Dutoit, Skryabin Piano Concerto in F sharp minor, Op. 20 (studio)/directed by Edo de Waart, Skryabin Prometheus: The Poem of Fire Op. 60 (live)/directed by Diego Masson, Prokofiev Piano Concerto no. 3, in C major, Op. 26 (live)/directed by Edo de Waart, Schoenberg Piano Concerto Op. 42 (live)/directed by Edo de Waart, Sitsky Piano Concerto no. 1 (studio)(revised version 1994) directed by David Porcelijn, Conyngham Southern Cross: Double Concerto for Violin (Wanda Wiłkomirska), Piano (Roger Woodward), soloists and Orchestra (composed 1981)(live)/directed by Nyklaus Wyss, Qu Xiao-Song Huan (composed 1987) (live)/directed by Diego Masson, Xenakis Kraanerg (composed 1968)(Sydney Opera House)(studio)/directed by Roger Woodward.	Ten live and four studio performances/seven cds.
1982	1986	EMI OASD 270403	Sydney	Barry Conyngham – Southern Cross, Double Concerto for Violin, Piano, Soloists and Orchestra	B. Conyngham	Southern Cross, Double Concerto for Violin, Piano, Soloists and Orchestra	Southern Cross – Double Concerto for Violin (Wanda Wiłkomirska), Piano (Roger Woodward) and the Sydney Symphony Orchestra directed by Nikolaus Wyss. Recorded Live in the Sydney Opera House concert for the Australian Broadcasting Corporation Fiftieth Anniversary in 1982. Reissued, 2014, in Roger Woodward – A Concerto Collection compact disc 6 of 7, ABC Classics/Universal 4811322.
1987	1989	Iceland Radio	Reykjavik, Concert Hall	Piano Concerto	A. Másson	Piano Concerto	Live performance Áskell Másson Piano Concerto (1987) with the Icelandic National Orchestra directed by Diego Masson.
1986	1986	J&B JB260		Solo	E. Satie, I. Albéniz, L. v. Beethoven, F. Chopin, J. S. Bach, W. A. Mozart, S. Prokofiev, P. Tchaikovsky, F. Liszt, E. Lecuona, E. Grieg.	Compilation of works	Compilation of Satie, Albéniz, Beethoven, Chopin, Bach, Mozart, Prokofiev, Tchaikovsky, Liszt, Lecuona, Grieg. Long play, Vinyl and also compact disc
1989	1989	Etcetera Records BV (Amsterdam) KTC 1075	Sydney Opera House	Xenakis – Kraanerg	I. Xenakis	Kraanerg	Alpha Centauri Ensemble directed by Roger Woodward from the Sydney Opera House. Etcetera Records BV, KTC 1075.
1989	1989	BMG-SPCD 1198		Claire de Lune	C. Debussy, R. Schumann, F. Liszt, J. Sibelius, E. Grieg, Bach/Grainger, E. Granados, F. Chopin, I. Paderewski, P. Tchaikovsky, S. Rakhmaninov	Various works.	Compilation of Debussy, Schumann, Liszt, Sibelius, Grieg, Bach-Grainger, Granados, Chopin, Paderewski, Tchaikovsky, Rakhmaninov
1990s	2005	ABC Classics/Universal 4768781	The Art of Roger Woodward				Seven compact discs presented as ABC 476 8781 including: Music from the Movies (two CDs) ABC 476 8785, Little Masterpieces (two CDs) ABC 476 8788, Piano Music of Peace and Tranquillity (one CD) ABC 476 8791, Chopin Album (two CDs) ABC 476 8782
1990's	1997	ABC Classics /Universal 4811742		Debussy – Piano Works	C. Debussy		Reissue of ABC 446 740–2 and 454 512–2
1990	1991	Etcetera Records BV (Amsterdam) KTC 1127	Sydney Spring International Festival of New Music 1990	Rolf Gehlhaar – Diagonal Flying	R. Gehlhaar	Diagonal Flying	Recorded with the composer (live electronics and percussion) and Roger Woodward (prepared and unprepared pianos, celeste and percussion). Live recording from the Sydney Spring International Festival of New Music. Recorded by ABC Classics/ Universal and issued by Etcetera Records BV – KTC 1127
1990	1991	ABC Classics 446739–2	Sydney Spring Festival	Complete piano works-Takemitsu	T. Takemitsu	For Away, Piano Distance, Uninterrupted Rest on a poem by Takiguchi Shuzo, Rain Tree Sketch I, Les Yeux Clos I & II, Litany, Corona -London Version.	An update of the 'complete' piano works was issued in 1991. – For Away, Piano Distance, Uninterrupted Rest on a poem by Takiguchi Shuzo, Rain Tree Sketch I, Les Yeux Clos I & II, Litany, Corona -London Version, performed live from the Sydney Spring International Festival of New Music (1990). ABC Classics 446739–2. Etcetera Records BV KTC 1103. Performed live from the Sydney Spring International Festival of New Music (1990). Ritmo prize, Spain
1990	1990	J&B JB425		Music of the Night	A. Lloyd Webber, L. Ritchie, B. Rowland, B. Smeaton, H. Blake, H. Hupfield, Vangelis, J. Nitzsche and B. Sainte-Marie; J. Pearson, P. Williams and K. Ascher, Jon English, J. Silbar and L. Henley, B. Montgomery, R. Whittaker, D. Grusin and J. Lennon	Various works	Compilation of popular themes from films and musicals in concert transcriptions by Roger Woodward and Geoffrey Abdallah (1990) including original music by Andrew Lloyd Webber, Lionel Richie, Bruce Rowland, Bruce Smeaton, Howard Blake, Herman Hupfield, Vangelis, Jack Nitzsche and Buffy Sainte-Marie; Johnny Pearson, Paul Williams and Kenneth Ascher, Jon English, Jeff Silbar and Larry Henley, Bob Montgomery, Roger Whittaker, Dave Grusin and John Lennon. Long-play, Vinyl and also compact disc. Recorded on two pianos. Piano I: Roger Woodward Piano II: Geoffrey Abdallah
1991	2012	ABC Classics/Universal 426 806–2		Sergei Prokofiev – Works for Piano 1908–1938	Sergei Prokofiev	Sarcasmes: Op. 17, Prelude Op. 12, No. 7, Suggestion Diabolique Op. 4, No. 4, Visiones Fugitives Op. 22, Etudes Op. 2, Children's Suite Op. 65, Pensées Op. 62, Nocturno Op. 43bis/2, Gavotta Op. 32, No. 3, Paysage Op. 59, No. 2, Marche Op.33a	Re-released by Celestial Harmonies 13292-6 in 2012
1991	1991	ABC Classics/ Etcetera Records BV Amsterdam		Morton Feldman – Solo piano music	M. Feldman	Triadic Memories, Piano, Two Pianos, Piano Three Hands, Piano Four Hands	Piano Four Hands with Ralph W. Lane. Recorded by ABC Classics and immediately licensed to Etcetera Records BV – KTC 2015. Diapason d'Or, France.
1991	1991	ABC Classics 426 806-2/ Etcetera Records BV, Amsterdam		Skryabin Late Piano Works	A. Skryabin	2 Danses Op. 73, 5 Préludes, Op. 74, Vers La Flamme (Poème), Op. 72, Sonate No.10, Op. 70, 2 Poèmes, Op. 71, 2 Poèmes, Op. 69, 2 Préludes, Op. 67, 2 Poèmes, Op. 63, Poème-Nocturne, Op. 61, Sonata No. 6, Op. 62, 3 Études, Op. 65	Distributed by Polygram. ABC licensed compact disc to Etcetera Records BV, Amsterdam KTC 1126. Reissued by ABC Classics as ABC 446 741–2
1992		Warner Classics 90311774722.		Rustle of Spring	G. Gershwin, P. Grainger, J. Joplin, E. Grieg, R. Schubert, R. Strauss, F. Mendelssohn, R. Schumann, F. Chopin, J. Brahms, S. Rakhmaninov, I. Albéniz, C. Debussy, E. Satie, P. Gowers, F. Liszt, R. Woodward	Various works	
1992	1997	DG/Universal	Wiener Konzerthaus	Xenakis – Keqrops	I. Xenakis	Keqrops	Wien Modern III/live performance 1992, with Mahler Jugendorchester directed by Claudio Abbado, Wiener Konzerthaus. Re-released 2011, by Universal Accord 2894804904 in a box of four compact discs entitled Alpha and Omega.
1992	2012	BBC Radio 3	Huddersfield International Festival of New Music, UK.	Nuovo Sincronie 92	F. Donati	Sincronie	Work for piano with cello accompaniment (Jacopo Scalfi) – originally recorded by BBC Radio 3 at a live concert, issued as a compact disc by Sipario Dischi sin 1012.
1992	1992	Warner Classics 4509903182		Roger Woodward plays Chopin	F. Chopin	Waltzes Opp. 34/1, Op. 64 nos. 1 and 2, 70/1 and 2, 42, E minor (posth), Berceuse Op. 57, Etudes 25/1, 10/3, Preludes Op. 28/4, 6, 7, 15, 20, 3, Mazurkas Op. 59, Polonaise Op. 53, Nocturne Op. 15/2, Ballade no. 4, Op. 52.	
1995	1997	ABC Classics/Universal 446 740–2		Images of Debussy	C. Debussy	L'isle Joyeuse, Estampes, D'un cahier d'esquisses, Images I and II. La plus que lente, Page d'album, Children's Corner	
1996	1997	ABC Classics/ Universal 454 512–2		Debussy Etudes, Suite Bergamasque, Images Oublieés	C. Debussy	Douze Etudes, Suite Bergamasque, Images 1, 2 and Image Oubliée	
1997	1997	ABC Classics/ Universal 456 688–2		Larry Sitsky Piano Concerto no. 1- The Twenty-Two Paths Of The Tarot	L. Sitsky	Piano Concerto no. 1- The Twenty-Two Paths Of The Tarot	Under Capricorn division of ABC Classics 456 688–2. Adelaide Symphony Orchestra conducted by David Porcelijn. Recorded and released 1997. Reissued in 2014 as part compact disc 6 of 7 Roger Woodward – A Concerto Collection. ABC 4811322.
1997	1997	ABC Classics/Universal 462 007–2		Anne Boyd Meditations on A Chinese Character	A. Boyd	Meditations On A Chinese Character with Angklung	Meditations On A Chinese Character (composed 1996, for eight musicians).
1997	1975	CPO 999 483–2		Feldman	M. Feldman	Piano and orchestra	Piano And Orchestra world premiere 1975, Saarlandischer Rundfunkorchester directed by Hans Zender, Metz Festival and the Saarländischer Runfunk. World premiere performance originally released as part of 20 Ans de musique contemporaine à Metz (1991) with Rolf Gehlhaar Phase, Yoshihisa Taira Radiance. Compact disc 010165318317.
1997	2014	ABC Classics 465 671–2		Skryabin Piano Concerto and Works for Solo Piano	A. Skryabin	Piano Concerto Op 20. Solo pieces: Opp. 2, 5, 16, 20, 32, 38, 42, 52, 57, 58, 59, 61, 62, 63, 65, 67, 69, 70, 71, 72, 73, 74.	In: Roger Woodward – A Concerto Collection. Sydney Symphony Orchestra directed by Edo de Waart. Two compact discs.
2005	2006	Foghorn Classics FCL 1988		Fragments Vol. 1	D. Shostakovich	String Piano Quartets Op. 49, 68, 83, 73, 57, 92,101,108. Preludes and Fugues Op. 87 No. 20 and 15	Shostakovich Piano Quintet Op. 57 recorded with the Alexander String Quartet, American Academy of Arts and Letters, New York as part of the ASQ's complete Shostakovich String Quartets (two volumes). Remastered and re-issued in 2017.
2006	2006	Celestial Harmonies 14620–2	Wörthsee, Bavaria	Fryderyk Chopin: The Complete Nocturnes	F. Chopin	Chopin Complete Nocturnes	
2006	2007	Celestial Harmonies 13259–2	Radio Bremen	Hans Otte Stundenbuch	Hans Otte	Stundenbuch Vol. 1 to 4	
2006	2007	Celestial Harmonies 13256-2	Wörthsee, Bavaria	Peter Michael Hamel Vom Klang des Lebens (Of The Sounds of Life)	Peter Michael Hamel	13 piano etudes	Recorded in the presence of the composer
2007	2007	Celestial Harmonies 13280–2	Wörthsee, Bavaria	J.S. Bach: Chromatic Fantasia and Fugue, Partitas no. 2 and 6	J.S. Bach	Chromatic Fantasia and Fugue in D minor, BWV 903, Partita no. 2, in C minor, BWV 826 and Partita no. 6	Preis der Deutschen Schallplattenkritik
2007	2013	Celestial Harmonies 13324–2	Sendesaal, Bremen	Roger Woodward in Concert	J.S. Bach, F. Chopin, C. Debussy	J.S. Bach: Partita VI, BWV 830, Chopin: Three Mazurkas Op. 59, Debussy :12 Preludes Book II	Recording of a live concert
2008	2007	Celestial Harmonies 13279–2	Radio Bremen	Debussy Préludes Books 1 and 2	C. Debussy	Préludes Books 1 and 2	Record of the Month. Music Web International (UK)
2008	2008	Celestial Harmonies 14281-2 and 19921-2	Wörthsee, Bavaria	J.S. Bach: Das Wohltemperierte Clavier	J.S. Bach	Das Wohltemperierte Clavier, Books I and II: 48 Preludes and Fugues (BWV 846–893)	Five compact discs
2009	2007	Celestial Harmonies 13277–2	Radio Bremen	Chopin Piano Concerto no. 2 in F minor, Beethoven in C major Piano Quartet	F. Chopin L. v. Beethoven	Chopin Piano Concerto no. 2 in F minor, Op. 21 and Ludwig van Beethoven Piano Quartet no. 3 in C major, WoO36	with the Alexander String Quartet
2009	2011	Celestial Harmonies 13255-2/co-production with Bayerischer Rundfunk/BR Klassik	Wörthsee, Bavaria	Music of the Russian Avant Garde 1905–1926	Nikolai Roslavets, Aleksandr Mosolov, Boris Pasternak, Aleksei Stantchinskiy, Julian Skryabin, Aleksandr Skryabin, Nikolai Obukhov.	Thirty-six solo piano solo works	It includes Ukrainian Avant Garde compositions
2023		Celestial Harmonies		Rădulescu Complete Piano Sonatas	H. Rădulescu	Piano Sonatas 1,2 and 4	
