= Roger Woodward =

Australian classical pianist (born 1942)

Roger Woodward AC OBE

Personal details
- Born: Roger Robert Woodward; 20 December 1942 (age 83) Chatswood, New South Wales, Australia
- Children: 3
- Education: Sydney Conservatorium of Music; University of Sydney (Doctor of Music)
- Occupation: Classical pianist, composer, conductor, teacher, human rights activist

Roger Robert Woodward AC OBE (born 20 December 1942) is an Australian classical pianist, composer, conductor, teacher and human rights activist. He is widely regarded as a leading advocate of contemporary classical music.

== Early life ==
Woodward was born in the Sydney suburb of Chatswood where he received his first piano lessons from Winifred Pope. Early studies of Bach organ works with Peter Verco were followed by a training in church music with Kenneth R. Long, organist and master of the choristers at St Andrew's Cathedral, Sydney. He performed for the papal organist Fernando Germani and Sir Eugene Goossens, after which he entered the Sydney Conservatorium in the piano class of Alexander Sverjensky and the composition class of Raymond Hanson.

While still a student, in 1963 he founded the city's international piano competition with widespread community support. He graduated the same year. In 1964, he won the Commonwealth Finals of the Australian Broadcasting Corporation's Instrumental and Vocal Competition, the prize for which was to perform throughout Australia with the six ABC state radio orchestras and in multiple radio and television broadcasts.From 1965 to 1969, he pursued postgraduate studies at the Chopin University of Music, with Zbigniew Drzewiecki.

During summer breaks he spent most of his time in London with Arthur Hedley and his library of original Chopin manuscripts. He began performing recitals at the Wigmore Hall and South Bank. During this period he performed throughout Poland (Note: Programs are available in the NLA Roger Woodward's Collection: Woodward 2018) at the Twenty-Third International Chopin Festival, Duszniki-Zdrój (1968), at Żelazowa Wola, at the Kraków Spring Festival (1968), at the Ostrowski Palace; with the Warsaw National Philarmonic Orchestra, with regional orchestras, and for Polish Radio and Television.

By 1969 he had also built a considerable repertoire of 20th-century compositions and performed Tōru Takemitsu's Uninterrupted Rest to the composer, who dedicated the work to him. Two further dedications followed in 1973, For Away and Corona (London version). In 1969–70, Woodward toured widely with the Wiener Trio and was artist in residence at the Casa de las Américas before performing at UNESCO 's Jeunesses Musicales where Yehudi Menuhin was jury member. The following year he made his debut with the Royal Philharmonic Orchestra at the Royal Festival Hall and, on Menuhin's recommendation, his first four recordings for EMI. (Note: OASD 7560, 7561, 7562, 7567 – EMI catalogue numbers of Woodward's first four commercial recordings released 1970 following Yehudi Menuhin's statement to the EMI Recording Co. shortly after hearing Woodward's Jeunesses Musicales performances in Paris, 1969: "Roger Woodward's performances of contemporary music showed that there were just so many different ways that he was able to interest and fascinate the listener, not only with sounds freely produced at the keyboard, but with magical sounds that came from inside the piano, from under it; from every possible part of the instrument. In every context his playing was beautiful, sensitive and wonderfully musical; his approach personal and imaginative as was proved by his Skryabin and Chopin." EMI subsequently printed the statement in full on each of the recordings.)

In 1971, Woodward performed his first recital at London's Queen Elizabeth Hall with works by Richard Meale, Ross Edwards, Leo Brouwer, Takemitsu and Barraqué, after which he was invited to co-found a series of new music concerts known as the London Music Digest at the Roundhouse. Digest performances of Barraqué's Sonate pour piano were followed by the recording at EMI's Abbey Road Studios. During the same period, Woodward worked with David Tudor and John Cage (Note: This collaboration is detailed in the 1972 BBC Promenade Concerts publication booklet (online) and, in addition to Woodward, involved David Tudor, Cornelius Cardew, John Tilbury, Frederick Page, Annea Lockwood, and Richard Bernas, directed by John Cage.) for the British premiere of HPSCHD at the International Carnival of Experimental Sound and the BBC Proms. Further collaborations were undertaken with Karlheinz Stockhausen at the Royal Festival Hall and with Tōru Takemitsu at the Music Today Festival, Tokyo. A series of performances followed with Pierre Boulez and the BBC Symphony Orchestra.

== Middle years ==
In 1972, Woodward made his American debut with the brass players of the Los Angeles Philharmonic, Olivier Messiaen and Zubin Mehta, with whom he subsequently performed in Tel Aviv, Jerusalem, New York and Paris. The following year, Woodward worked with Stockhausen on Mantra. In 1973 he participated in the inaugural celebrations of the Sydney Opera House as a part of tours for the Australian Broadcasting Commission and Musica Viva which included first performances of works by Peter Sculthorpe, Ross Edwards, Barry Conyngham and Anne Boyd. A collaboration began with Iannis Xenakis (1973–96) in France, the UK, Austria, Italy and the United States, during which the composer dedicated three works to Woodward: Mists for solo piano, Keqrops for piano and orchestra and Paille in the Wind for piano and cello.

In 1974, Witold Rowicki invited Woodward on an extensive tour of the US with the Warsaw Philharmonic Orchestra, during which he made his debut at Carnegie Hall. That year, Woodward founded Music Rostrum Australia at the Sydney Opera House where he collaborated with Richard Meale, Luciano Berio, Cathy Berberian, David Gulpilil and Yūji Takahashi. He began performing with the Cleveland Orchestra directed by Lorin Maazel, and appeared regularly at the Festival d'automne à Paris, BBC Promenade Concerts, La Biennale di Venezia, the Warszawska Jesień, Festival Internacional Cervantino, Wien Modern at the invitation of Claudio Abbado, at the New York Piano Festival, Festival de la Roque d'Anthéron and at the Festival de la grange de Meslay, Touraine, at the invitation of its artistic director, Sviatoslav Richter. In 1975 he premiered Morton Feldman's Piano and Orchestra with the Saarbrücken Rundfunkorchester at the Metz Festival directed by Hans Zender. In the same year he made the first complete recording in the West of Dmitri Shostakovich's 24 Preludes and Fugues, Op. 87, and became Membre correspondant of the Fryderyk Chopin Institute, Warsaw.

In 1976–80, he began working with Kurt Masur and the Gewandhaus Orchestra. In 1977, he premiered Feldman's solo work Piano, commissioned Elisabeth Lutyens's Nox, Op.118, and performed at the Valldemosa Chopin Festival. From 1978 to 1988, he performed the complete Beethoven concertos, three cycles of which were directed by Georg Tintner, (Note: Now the Queensland Orchestra.) and the cycle of Beethoven's 32 piano sonatas in 10 cities. (Note: At Cardiff University (1977), Adelaide Festival (1978), Kenwood House, London (1979), at the Sydney Festival (1980), further performances of the Beethoven Sonata cycle followed at the Queen Elizabeth Hall, London (1980), Regent Theatre, Sydney, side by side with the complete string quartets performed by the Sydney String Quartet;(1981), Hobart Town Hall (1983), Toorak Uniting Church, Melbourne (1983), Queensland Performing Arts Centre, Brisbane (1982 and 1988).)

In 1980 he was recipient of the Order of the British Empire and performed the premiere of Xenakis's Mists in Edinburgh. In 1981 he performed for Queen Elizabeth II and, at London's Institute of Contemporary Arts, the premiere of Morton Feldman's Triadic Memories In 1982 he premiered Conyngham's Double Concerto "Southern Cross" with the Polish violinist Wanda Wiłkomirska and the Melbourne Symphony Orchestra. Four years later, he premiered Xenakis' Keqrops, at the Lincoln Center, with the New York Philharmonic Orchestra under Zubin Mehta, and in 1987 he premiered Áskell Másson's piano concerto in Reykjavik. The following year he directed 25 performances of Xenakis's ballet Kraanerg at the Sydney Opera House in collaboration with Graeme Murphy and the Sydney Dance Company to celebrate the memory of Charter 77 and the ongoing struggle of Poland's Solidarność Movement. In 1989, Woodward was commissioned by the Festival d'automne à Paris for the bicentennial celebrations of the French Revolution when he premiered his work for two pianos and live electronics—Sound by Sound. In the same year he founded the Sydney Spring International Festival of New Music (1989–2001) and Alpha Centauri, a new-music ensemble of 23 soloists, which had presented and recorded Kraanerg. In the same year he premiered Rolf Gehlhaar's Diagonal Flying in Geneva with the composer.

In 1991, Woodward was recipient of the Diapason d'or and Ritmo Prize and the following year became Companion of the Order of Australia. He toured Italy, France and the UK with Alpha Centauri during which he premiered Donatoni’s Sincronie. In 1993, Lech Wałęsa, president of a free Poland, conferred the Order of Merit upon him. During the 1990s, Woodward toured Estonia, Latvia and China, co-founded and directed the Kötschach-Mauthner Musikfest (1993–97), and in 1992, directed an all-Xenakis program at Scala di Milano. (Note: With the musicians of the Alpha Centauri Ensemble during which he premiered Xenakis' "Paille in the Wind" with Jacopo Scalfi.) He performed at the Hollywood Bowl, Gulbenkian Garden, the Odéon of Herodes Atticus, (Note: Program of the Athens 1979 Festival https://iscm.org/wnmd/1979-athens; September 1979, Woodward played Liszt's Les jeux d'eaux à la villa d'este, Feldman's Piano (1977), and premiered Rolf Gehlhaar's Strangeness, Charm and Colour with London Brass, at the Odéon Herodes Atticus at the 52nd International Society for Contemporary Music Festival (ISCM World Music Days).) and in traditions pioneered by Nellie Melba and Percy Grainger, he performed throughout Central and Regional Australia. He commissioned a series of piano concertos from Larry Sitsky, the first of which was premiered at the 1994 Sydney Spring International Festival of New Music and cited by the UNESCO International Rostrum of Composers (1995). In 1996, Woodward composed Five Songs In Memoriam Takemitsu for unaccompanied cello which was performed by Nathan Waks at the Seventh Sydney Spring.

Woodward was voted a National Living Treasure by the National Trust of Australia in 1997. During that year he performed at Théâtre Marigny (home to Boulez's Domaine musical) for the Festival d’automne and worked with Arvo Pärt, Gehlhaar, Rădulescu, Chris Dench and James Dillon, for the premiere of the first part of The Book of Elements in London and subsequently, at the Sydney Spring. In the same year he founded the Joie et Lumière chamber music festival at Le Château de Bagnols (1997–2004), to celebrate the life and work of Sviatoslav Richter. He completed the degree of Doctor of Music at the University of Sydney in 1999 and was recipient of four doctorates honoris causa from 1992 to 1998.

In 2001, Woodward was awarded Australia's Centenary Medal; in 2004 the Ordre des Arts et des Lettres Republic of France and in 2005, the Polish Medal z okazji 25. rocznicy podpisania Porozumień Sierpniowych i powstania NSZZ "Solidarność". From 2000–2001, he was chair of music at the University of New England (Australia) and in 2002, chair of the School of Music, San Francisco State University. During 2002–2018 he toured with SFSU colleagues—the Alexander String Quartet—in the United States and Germany where he recorded works of Beethoven, Chopin, Shostakovich and Robert Greenberg. Between 2006 and 2023, he recorded seventeen projects for the Celestial Harmonies label. His performances of J. S. Bach's The Well-Tempered Clavier, Hans Otte's Stundenbuch, Shostakovich's 24 Preludes and Fugues Op.87, Debussy's Préludes, Prokofiev's Piano Music 1908–38 and Horațiu Rădulescu piano sonatas were highly praised. His performances of J. S. Bach's Partitas BWV 826, 830 and Chromatische Fantasie und Fuge, BWV 903, were awarded the Preis der deutschen Schallplattenkritik (2007). In 2011 he performed works of Xenakis with L' orchestre national de Lille, the cellist Rohan de Saram and JACK Quartet, at Les flâneries musicales de Reims. In the same year he was awarded Poland's Gloria Artis (gold class).

== Legacy ==
Woodward is a pianist with a powerful virtuoso technique and his performances are renowned for their precision, insight, and depth of interpretation, although sometimes reviewed as unorthodox for their modernity. He has received wide critical acclaim as a leading interpreter of avant-garde works of the second half of the 20th century, including those of: Boyd, Feldman, Gehlhaar, Másson,Takemitsu, (Note: See also Burt 2001, pp. 128–131) Qu Xia-Song, Rădulescu, Xenakis, (Note: Richter commented about Woodward's recorded performance of Xenakis' Mists and Sinaphai: "C'est la première fois que j'entends de la musique de Xenakis; je suis sidéré, même si je ne suis pas certain d'avoir vraiment (ou même vraiment pas) compris cette musique. L'intuition? Mais peut-on toujours s'y fier? Que Woodward joue cette musique de façon convaincante, je l'ai maintenant compris. Il me semble que voilà effectivement de la vraie 'nouvelle' musique." (Monsaingeon 1998, p. 342)) and recordings with Boulez, Barraqué, Stockhausen, Bussotti, Donatoni, Fariñas, Brouwer, Conyngham, Edwards, Peter Michael Hamel, Lutyens, Rands and Cage.

Steeped in church music and traditional repertoire, Woodward trained throughout his early life to perform established works side by side with more recent music as part of a belief that music was the essential expression of an experimental process. Most of his concerts reflected this belief even though such programming was considered unorthodox for the time. In recital, he often programmed traditional 18th and 19th century repertoire with new, little known, or neglected works such as those he championed by experimental fin de siècle Russian, Ukrainian and early Soviet composers (Alexander Scriabin, Alexander Mosolov, Nikolai Roslavets, Ivan Vyshnegradsky, Nikolai Obukhov, Aleksei Stanchinsky). Woodward worked with the New York, Los Angeles, Beijing, Israel Philharmonic Orchestra, the Cleveland Orchestra, the five London orchestras, the Hallé Orchestra, London Sinfonietta, London Mozart Players, London Brass, the Royal Scottish National Orchestra, the Leipzig Gewandhaus Orchestra, Royal Danish Orchestra, L'orchestre National de Paris, the Gustav Mahler Jugendorchester, EEC Youth Orchestra and the Budapest and Prague Chamber Orchestras.

Notable conductors with whom he worked include: Mehta, Abbado, Boulez, Charles Dutoit, Lorin Maazel, Edo de Waart, Charles Mackerras, Simon Romanos, Kurt Masur, Paavo Berglund, Georg Tintner, Tan Lihua, Erich Leinsdorf, Walter Susskind, Georges Tzipine, Paul Terracini and Péter Eötvös. As a conductor, some of Woodward's performances include: the Xenakis ballet Kraanerg at the Sydney Opera House; working with the Shanghai Conservatory Orchestra, the Adelaide Chamber Orchestra and with the Alpha Centauri Ensemble at Scala di Milano, for BBC2 Television, the Festival d'automne à Paris, the Academia Santa Cecilia, Biblioteca Salaborsa, and for the Sydney Spring International Festival of New Music.

He performed with the Arditti, Tokyo, JACK and Alexander String Quartets, with the harpsichordist George Malcolm; jazz pianist Cecil Taylor in Lisbon, Paris, for the Patras Festival, and for extensive tours of the UK Contemporary Music Network from 1986 to 1994. He worked with musicologists Charles Rosen, Heribert Henrich, Paul Griffiths, H. C. Robbins-Landon, Richard Toop, Paul M. Ellison, Nouritza Matossian, Brigitte Schiffer and Sharon Kanach; violinists Philippe Hirschhorn and Ivry Gitlis; violist James Creitz; cellists Rohan de Saram and Nathan Waks; flautist Pierre Yves- Artaud, the ceremonial dancer David Gulpilil (Dalaithngu), and the composers Frank Zappa and Philippe Sarde.

He is published by Greenway Press, N.Y., Pendragon Press, NY, Praeger E. R. P. Musikverlag, Berlin.In 2015, HarperCollins and Kindle published his autobiography Beyond Black And White–My Life in Music. He is a Fellow of the Australian Academy of the Humanities and a member of the Australian Republic Movement.

== Human rights and activism ==
Early encounters with Holocaust victims impacted Woodward's personal development. He believes that the creative artist is a bulwark for society on matters of cultural diversity, injustice and human rights. He was acknowledged by the Scarman Report and the London Metropolitan Police after the 1981 Brixton riots and by the city of Darwin following Australia's Cyclone Tracy. Throughout the 1980s he dedicated himself to the Polish Solidarność Movement with performances of the complete works of Chopin to raise awareness of the importance of Poland's freedom struggle.

== Principal awards and honours ==
- 1980: Officer of the Most Excellent Order of the British Empire, UK
- 1988: Ancient Order of Bréifne
- 1992: Companion of the Order of Australia
- 1993: Commander Cross, Order of Merit, Republic of Poland
- 1997: National Living Treasure, National Trust of Australia
- 1998: Doctor of Laws, honoris causa, University of Alberta, Canada
- 2001: Centenary Medal, Australia
- 2004: Chevalier dans l'ordre des arts et des lettres, Republic of France
- 2011: Gloria Artis (gold class) medal, Republic of Poland

== Principal recordings and publications ==
Woodward's principal recordings were issued by ABC Classics (Australia), Accord (France), Artworks (Australia), BMG, Col Legno (Munich), CPO, Decca, Deutsche Grammophon, EMI, Etcetera Records BV, Explore Records, Foghorn Classics (San Francisco), JB (Australia), Polskie Nagrania, Sipario Dischi (Milano), Unicorn (UK), Universal, Warner and RCA Red Seal (UK) for whom Woodward made the first complete recording (in the West) of Dmitry Shostakovich's Twenty-four Preludes and Fugues, Op. 87, rereleased by Celestial Harmonies (2010).

Woodward's live concerts were recorded for ABC Radio/TV, BBC Radio/TV, Radio NZ, RAI, Radio France, Radio/TV Cuba, Hong Kong Radio, Radio China, Radio/TV Japan, Polish Radio/TV, RTE (Dublin), multiple German radio stations including Radio Berlin; Hilversum Radio (Netherlands), and for the UNESCO Rostrum/Paris. Video recordings have been issued by Allied Artists (UK), BBC TV Productions, Chanan Productions (UK), Foghorn Classics (San Francisco), Kultur (China), Polygram (Australia), Smith Street Films (Australia), Endeavour Film Productions (Australia) and the Sydney Dance Company.

Three Celestial Harmonies compact disc recordings were named "Record of the Month" by MusicWeb International: Debussy Préludes Books 1 and 2 (March 2010); Roger Woodward In Concert (October 2013) and Prokofiev Works for Solo Piano 1908–1938 (April 2013), which was nominated Best Classical Album at Australia's 1992 Aria awards. A recording for Etcetera BV of Scriabin's Piano Works was "Record of the Month" on Musicweb International (July 2002).The Etcetera BV release (1989) of Xenakis' Kraanerg with the Alpha Centauri Ensemble directed by Roger Woodward was selected by the music critics of The Sunday Times, UK, as one of the most outstanding releases of that year. In 1991, Woodward shared the Diapason d'Or with fellow Australian and senior ABC recording producer Ralph Lane, for their recording of Morton Feldman's solo piano music (ABC Classics). This recording was record of the month in April 1991 (Télérama, Paris).

Woodward was the recipient of the Preis der Deutschen Schallplattenkritik (2007), for performances of J. S. Bach's Partitas BWV 826 and 830, and Chromatische Fantasie und Fuge BWV 903. This recording was also named one of the finest of the year by MusicWeb International (2008) and nominated Best Classical Album at Australia's 1993 Aria awards. His performances of J. S. Bach's Well-Tempered-Clavier was editor's choice for The Gramophone, UK (February 2010).

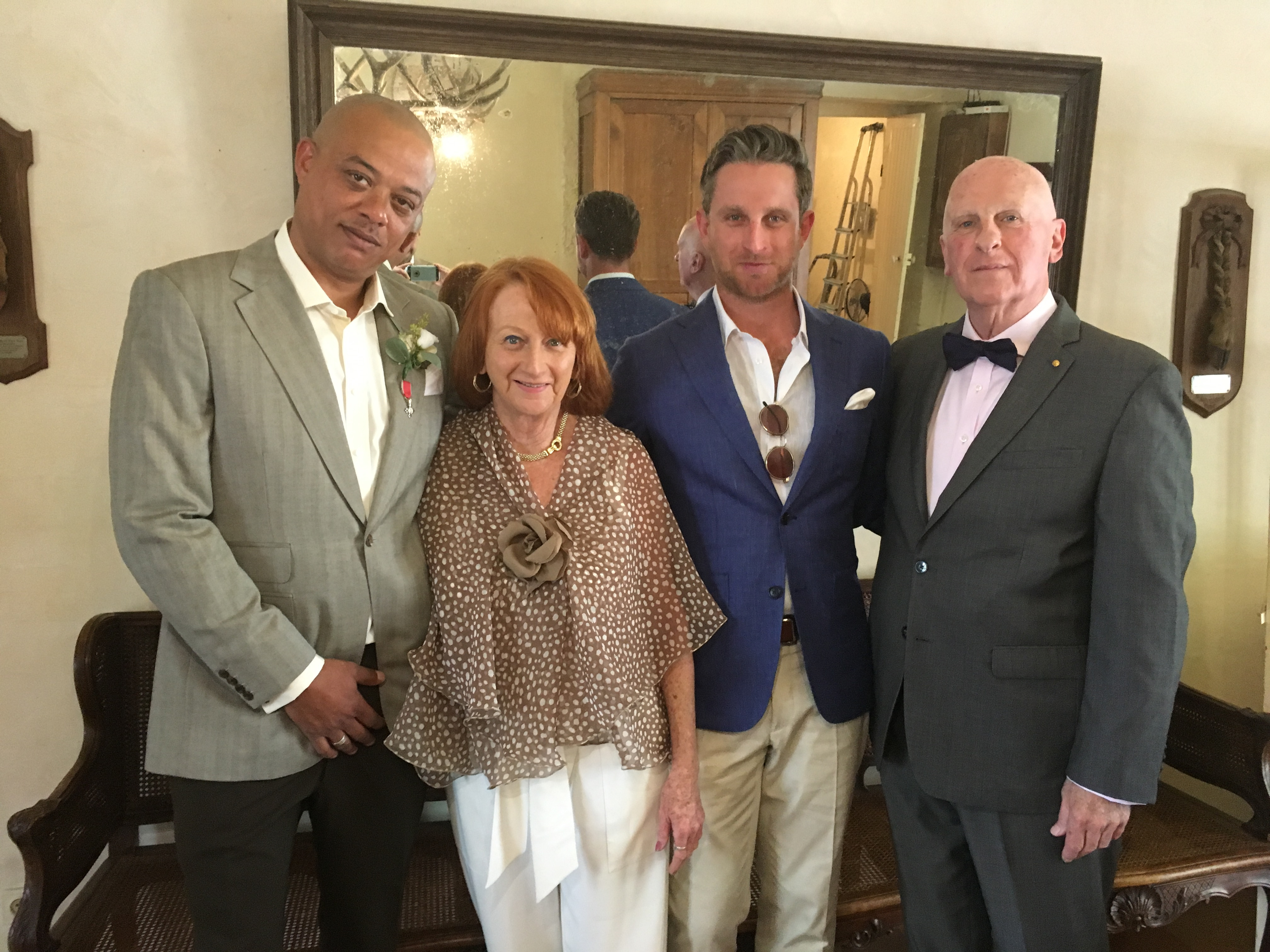
Woodward (right) with Patricia Ludgate and sons Elroy and Benjamin, Cazenac 2018

In 1991, Woodward shared the Diapason d'Or with fellow Australian and senior ABC recording producer Ralph Lane, for their recording of Morton Feldman's piano music (ABC Classics). This recording was record of the month in April 1991 (Télérama, Paris).

Ralph Lane recorded a wide range of live and studio projects with Woodward (1988–2018) some of which were named record of the month, including the aforementioned Prokofiev, Scriabin and Xenakis recordings. In 1991, he was recipient of the Ritmo Prize (Spain) for his Etcetera BV recording of Takemitsu's piano music (also produced by Lane). In January 1991, the same recording was record of the month (Télérama, Paris). In 2008, his recording of The Music of Frédéric Chopin was nominated Best Classical Album at Australia's Aria Awards. In 2015, ABC Classics/Universal released A Concerto Collection comprising ten live and four studio concerto performances of J. S. Bach, Beethoven, Chopin, Rachmaninoff, Scriabin, Prokofiev, Schoenberg, Larry Sitsky, Barry Conyngham, Qu Xiao-Song and his direction of the Xenakis ballet Kraanerg.

== Personal life ==
Woodward has three children; Asmira Woodward-Page who is a concert violinist, Benjamin Woodward and Elroy Palmer.

== Works ==
- Woodward, Roger (May 1971). "Penderecki in London". In Music & Musicians. London: Hansom Books Press.
- Woodward, Roger (1998). "Music and Change: Some Considerations of Beethoven's Sonata quasi una Fantasia in C sharp minor Op 27 no 2 (Moonlight)'". Literature and Aesthetics. 8. ISSN 1036-9368.
- Woodward, Roger (2001). "Jean Barraqué". Matters of the Mind. ISBN 1864873620.
- Woodward, Roger (2002b). "Preparation for Xenakis and 'Keqrops', Xenakis Studies: In Memoriam". Contemporary Music Review. 21: 109–120. doi:10.1080/07494460216660. S2CID 191181966.
- Woodward, Roger (2005). "Sitsky's Keyboard Music: Si Yeoo Ki". In Sitsky, Larry (ed.). Australian Piano Music of The Twentieth Century. Praeger. pp. 129–155. ISBN 9780313322860.
- Woodward, Roger (2006). Fryderyck Chopin: The Complete Nocturnes (cover note). Celestial Harmonies.
- Woodward, Roger (2007). J.S. Bach: Chromatic Fantasia and Fugue, Partitas no. 2 and 6 (cover note). Celestial Harmonies.
- Woodward, Roger (2007). Chopin Piano Concerto no. 2 in F minor, Beethoven in C major Piano Quartet (cover note). Celestial Harmonies.
- Woodward, Roger (2008). J.S. Bach: Das Wohltemperierte Clavier (cover note). Celestial Harmonies.
- Woodward, Roger (2009). Dmitry Shostakovich – 24 Preludes and Fugues Op. 87 (cover note). Celestial Harmonies.
- Woodward, Roger (2009). Music of the Russian Avant Garde 1905–1926 (cover note). Celestial Harmonies.
- Woodward, Roger (2012). Two Cadenzas: 1. for the Allegro maestoso of Mozart's Piano Concerto no. 25 in C major, KV 503. 2. For the Allegro con brio of Beethoven's Piano Concerto no. 1 in C major, Op. 15. ERP Musikverlag.
- Woodward, Roger (2012). Sergei Prokofiev – Works for Piano 1908–1938 (cover note). Celestial Harmonies.
- Woodward, Roger (2012). Roger Woodward in Concert (cover note). Celestial Harmonies.
- Woodward, Roger (2014). Jean Barraqué Sonate pour piano (cover note). Celestial Harmonies.
- Woodward, Roger (2024). "Begegnungen Mit Toru Takemitsu". In Bandur, Markus; Schmusch, Rainer (eds.). Tōru Takemitsu Globalisiertes Komponieren – Text, Kontext, Deutung. Munich: Edition text+kritik. ISBN 9783869168180.

== See also ==
- List of Roger Woodward's principal first performances, recordings, and publications
