= Piano (Feldman) =

1977 piano piece by Morton Feldman

Piano is a solo piano piece composed by the American composer Morton Feldman in 1977, dedicated to the Australian classical pianist Roger Woodward and premiered by him in Südwestrundfunk, Baden-Baden, 1977. Piano is one of three major works (the others are Piano and Orchestra and Triadic Memories) that Feldman wrote for, and dedicated to, Roger Woodward. The score of Piano is published by Universal Edition.
