= Klaus Hiemann =

Music producer

Klaus Hiemann is a Classical recording engineer and producer. He has recorded such artists as Maurizio Pollini, Claudio Abbado, Dietrich Fischer-Dieskau, Seiji Ozawa, Plácido Domingo, Gerhard Oppitz, Wilhelm Kempff, Martha Argerich, Arturo Benedetti Michelangeli, Giuseppe Sinopoli and numerous others.

== Mantra (Stockhausen) ==
In 1971, Klaus Hiemman recorded Mantra by the German composer Karlheinz Stockhausen, which was also the first/first composer supervised recording of the piece. It was recorded by the Aloys and Alfons Kontarsky piano duet, the same duet which Stockhausen wrote the piece for. Stockhausen instructed Hiemann and the producer, Rudolf Werner, in order to approve of the recording.
