= Mantra (Stockhausen) =

Composition by Karlheinz Stockhausen

- Piano music by Karlheinz Stockhausen
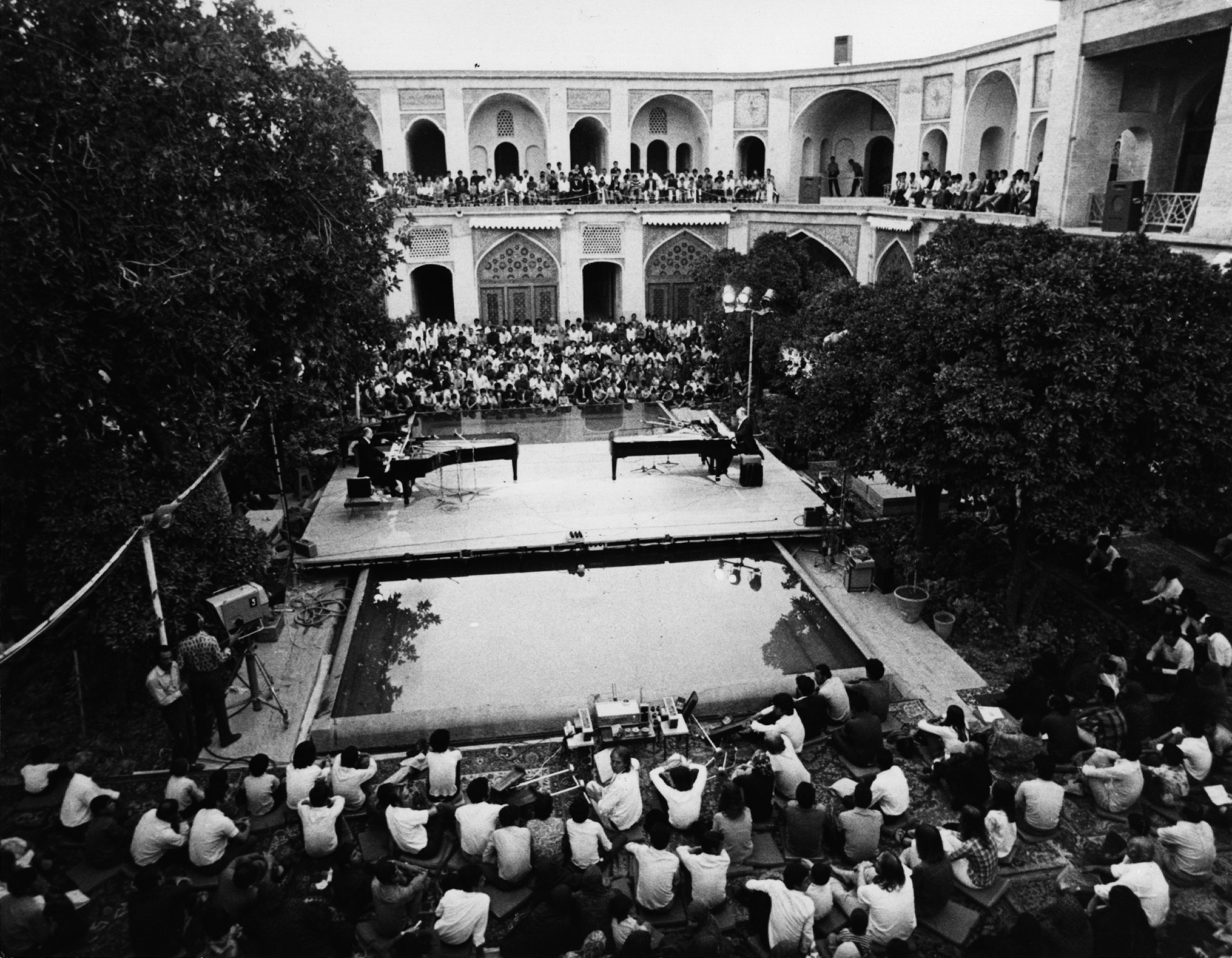
- Alfons and Aloys Kontarsky performing Mantra with Stockhausen (foreground), Shiraz Arts Festival, 2 September 1972
- Catalogue: 32
- Composed: 1970
- Performed: 18 October 1970 Donaueschingen Festival
- Published: 1975 Stockhausen-Verlag
- Duration: 70 minutes
- Scoring: 2 ring-modulated pianos; crotales; wood blocks

Mantra is a composition by the German composer Karlheinz Stockhausen. It was composed in 1970 and premiered in autumn of the same year at the Donaueschingen Festival. The work is scored for two ring-modulated pianos; each player is also equipped with a chromatic set of crotales and a wood block, and one player is equipped with either a shortwave radio producing Morse code signals or a recording of Morse code. In his catalogue of works, the composer designated it as work number 32.

== History ==
Stockhausen had been interested for several years in writing for the piano duo of Aloys and Alfons Kontarsky, and by early 1969 he had become determined to do so. On a flight across the United States in September 1969 or shortly before, he sketched "a kind of theater piece for two pianos" titled Vision, and in March 1970 began to work out a score, but broke off after just three pages. During an automobile trip from Madison, Connecticut to Boston, a melody came to Stockhausen, along with the idea of expanding such a figure over a very long period of time—fifty or sixty minutes. He wrote the melody down on an envelope at that time, but it only occurred to him after having abandoned Vision that this might become the basis for his new two-piano composition. Stockhausen later recalled that this was early in September 1969, but the sketch is in fact dated 26 February.

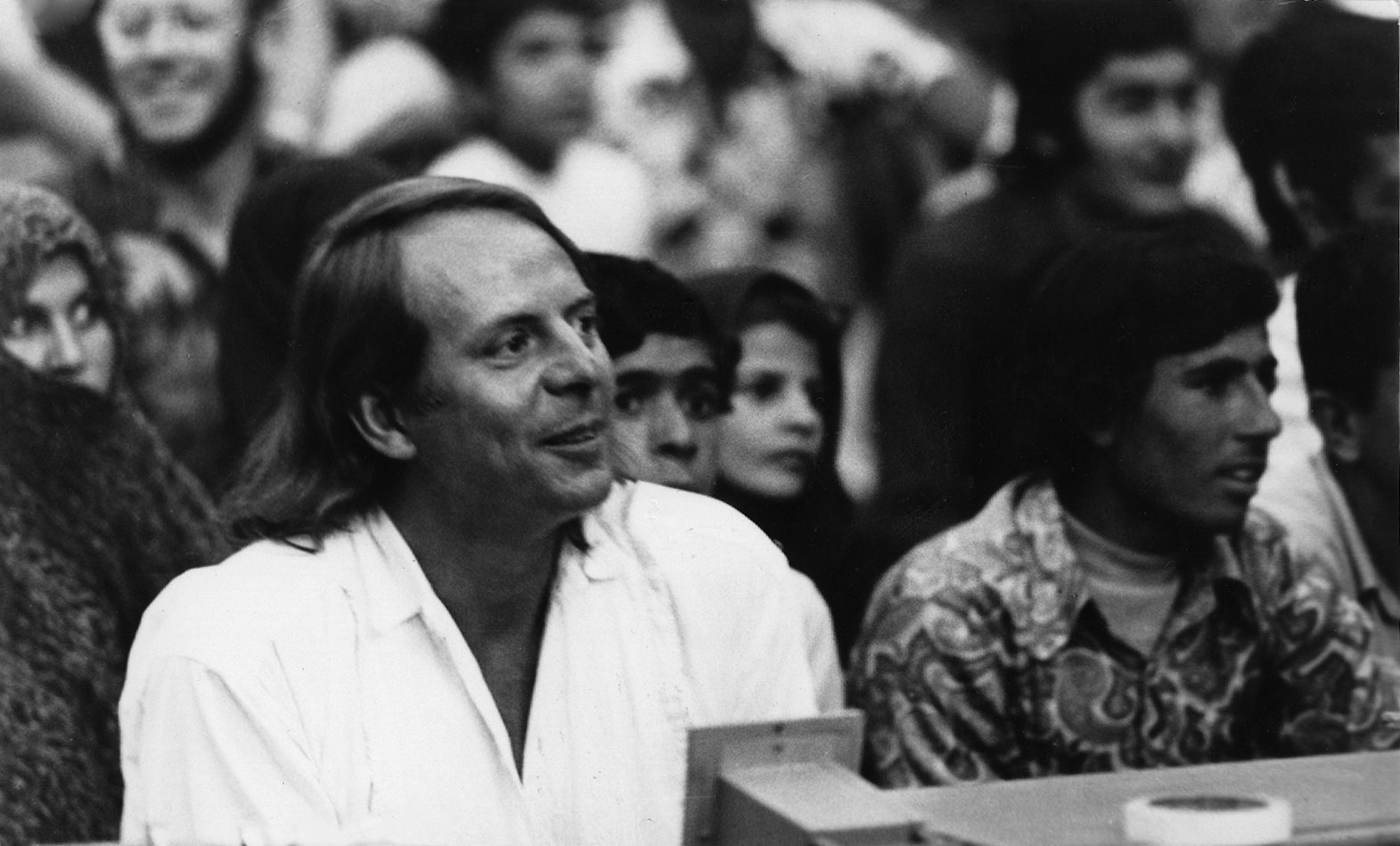
Stockhausen on 2 September 1972 at the Shiraz Arts Festival, at the sound controls for Mantra

On 22 September 1969 at the Couvent d'Alziprato in southern France, Stockhausen composed an intuitive music text composition, Intervall, for piano four hands, but it did not appeal to the Kontarsky brothers—especially to Alfons, who lacked the experience his brother Aloys had gained from performing text-pieces from Aus den sieben Tagen as a member of Stockhausen's ensemble. Intervall, eventually premiered by Roger Woodward and Jerzy Romaniuk, later became part of Stockhausen's second cycle of intuitive-music compositions, Für kommende Zeiten.

Stockhausen mentioned his wish to write for the Kontarsky brothers to Heinrich Strobel, director of the Music Division of the SWF Baden-Baden and artistic director of the Donaueschingen Festival, and toward the end of 1969 Strobel commissioned a work for two pianos for the 1970 Donaueschingen Festival. After abandoning Vision, Stockhausen took up the melody he had jotted down the previous September and on its basis and laid out the new work's skeleton between 1 May and 20 June 1970 in Osaka. He then completed the score in an unbroken stretch of work at his home in Kürten from 10 July to 18 August 1970. Alfons and Aloys Kontarsky gave the premiere of Mantra in Donaueschingen on 18 October 1970, and made the first recording of the work from 10 to 13 June 1971 at the Tonstudio Kreillerstraße 22 in Munich, for Deutsche Grammophon. The score first appeared in print only in 1975, as one of the first publications of the newly-founded Stockhausen-Verlag.

== Structure ==
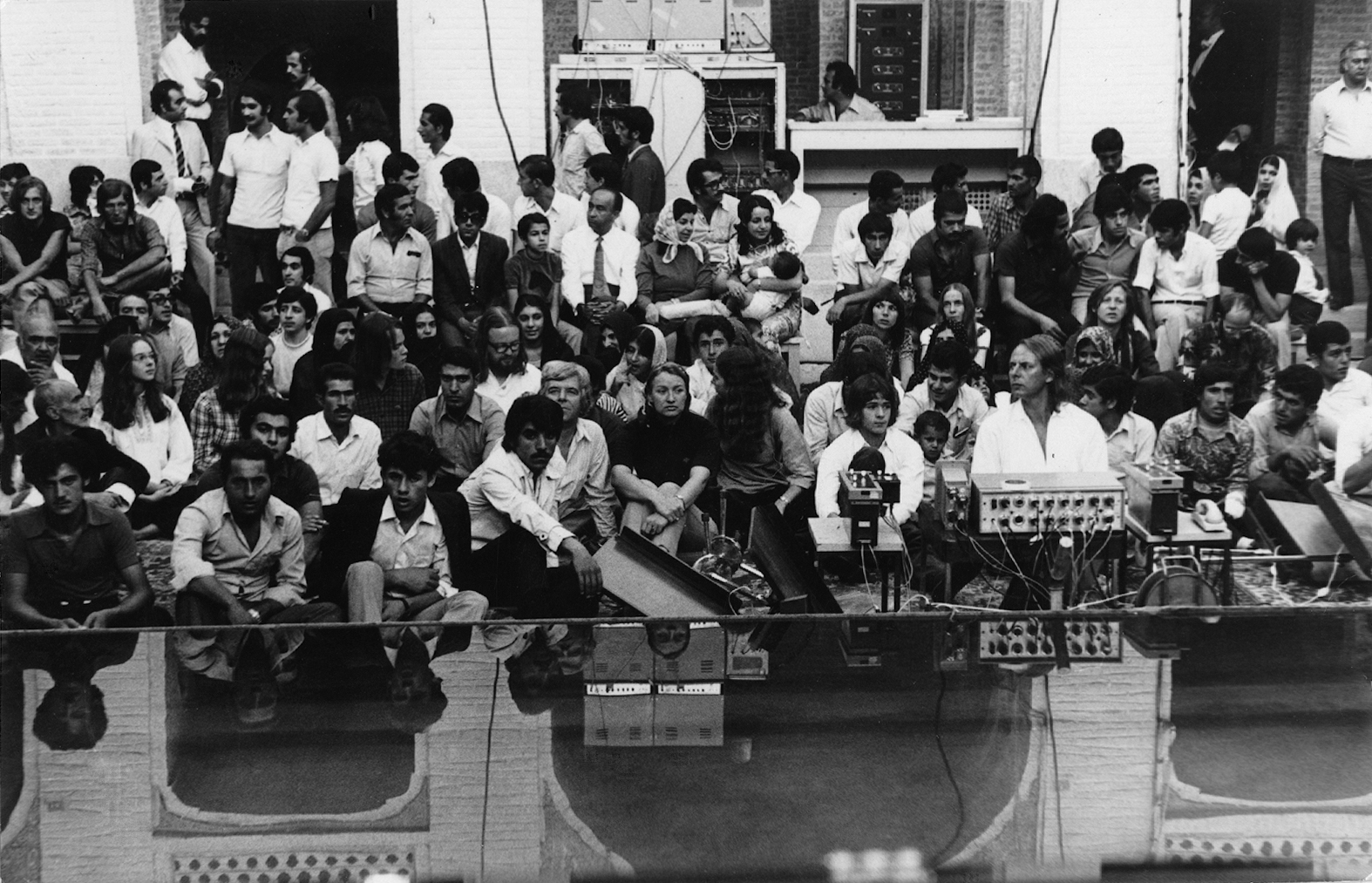
Stockhausen at the sound desk for Mantra, Seraye Moshir, Shiraz, 2 September 1972

Mantra is the first determinate work (that is, the score is completely written down, though there are some passages involving a modest degree of improvisation) that Stockhausen composed after a long phase of indeterminate works. It involves the expansion and contraction of a contrapuntal pair of melodies, which Stockhausen called a "formula". In this particular work, the first of a long succession of compositions to use what he would term formula composition, Stockhausen chose the term "mantra" in order "to avoid the words theme, row or subject, as in a fugue" (Stockhausen 2003, 2), and "Mantra" also became the title of the entire work. In Mantra, the two-strand formula is stated near the outset of the piece by piano I. The mantra "has thirteen notes, and each cymbal sound occurring once in the piece indicates the large sections—you hear the cymbal whenever a new central sound announces the next section of the work". Although "the cymbals have the same pitches as the mantra and can thus mark the 13 form cycles of the two pianists … they are not identical", and "there are also some sections in which a larger number of cymbal strokes occurs". Though the mantra recurs constantly, the structure of the composition is not a classical theme and variations because the material is never varied, only expanded and contracted in duration and pitch to different degrees. The strict predetermination of the form is occasionally broken and altered through the use of insertions, additions, and small deviations and exceptions. Near the end of the composition, there is an extremely fast section that is a compression of the entire work into the smallest temporal space.

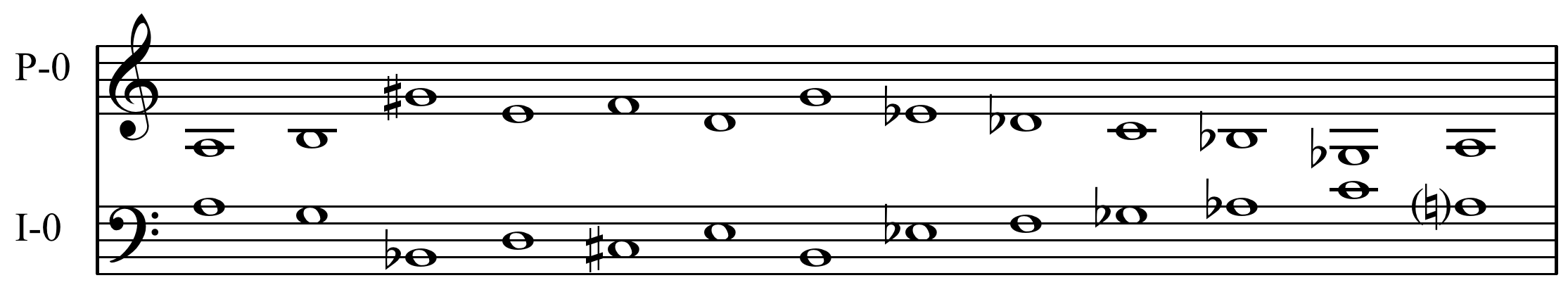
Thirteen-note tone row and its inversion. Everything in the work is based on this row and, in addition, it is used to define the large-scale structure of the piece by providing a series of tonics by means of the ring modulation. The prime form of the row is used in piano I's oscillator, the inversion in piano II's oscillator, with one note from each row form in each of the work's thirteen sections.)

The "mantra" (melody formula) is made of an upper and lower voice and divided temporally into 4 segments with rests of 3, 2, 1, and 4 crotchets' duration following the segments. The 13 notes of the mantra's upper voice form a 12-tone row where the 13th note returns to the first note A. The lower voice consists of an intervallic inversion of the upper voice with transposed segments: the first segment of the lower voice corresponds to the inversion of second segment of the upper voice and vice versa; similarly, the third and fourth segments in the inverted voice are also exchanged. The pitches are shown in the example to the right, and the complete formula can be seen at Nordin n.d..

Each of the 13 notes of the mantra has an attached characteristic, or "pitch form"; the 13 notes of the upper voice have in order the following characteristics:

1. periodic repetition at the beginning (on A in the original transposition)
2. accent at the end of a duration on B
3. G♯ without any characteristic
4. a turn around the beginning of the note E
5. slow tremolo between F and D
6. an accented chord at the end of the F–D oscillation
7. a sharp accent (with a single repetition) at the beginning of a duration on G
8. a descending chromatic scale connecting the G to the following E♭
9. staccato (very short duration) on D♭
10. irregular repetition ("Morse code") of the note C
11. an inverted (upper-note) mordent on the beginning of B♭
12. sharp attack with an echo: sfz (fp), on G♭
13. arpeggio connecting the previously articulated pitch (E-flat in the other voice, an augmented eleventh lower) upward to A

In addition to its articulative characteristic, each of the thirteen notes is assigned a particular dynamic, in approximate inverse proportion to its duration. The very first note is the sole exception to this rule:

a. with constant intensities
pp	5.5 ×	= character V
p	6 ×	= character XIII
p	4 ×	= character IV
p	1 ×	= character I (exception)
mp	4 ×	= character XI
mp	3 ×	= character III
mf	1 ×	= character VI
f	1 ×	= character IX
b. with crescendo or decrescendo
(m)p >	7 ×	= character X
< mf	2 ×	= character VIII
sfz (fp)	2 ×	= character XII
(p)–f	2 ×	= character II, where f = 1 ×
ff >	5 ×	= character VII, where ff = 1 ×

The thirteen cycles of the composition are based on the 13 notes of the mantra and the 13 characteristics detailed above. Each cycle is dominated by its corresponding note and characteristic. In this way, a single statement of the mantra is spread over the length of the entire composition, though the durations of the mantra notes are not incorporated into this overall plan.

The sounds of each piano are picked up by microphones and fed into an electronic apparatus specially built to the composer's specifications by Lawo, dubbed the Modul 69 B. The Modul 69 B consists of a microphone preamplifier with three inputs, a compressor, a band-pass filter, a ring modulator, a sine-wave generator, and a volume control. By means of this device, each piano's sounds are ring modulated with a sine tone tuned to the pitch of the mantra formula governing each of the thirteen large segments of the composition, and the modulated sound is played over loudspeakers placed behind and above the performers. The first pianist presents the upper thirteen tones, the second pianist the lower thirteen. Because the starting and ending pitch of the mantra is successively transposed onto these central pitches, they sound consonant, while the other pitches have dissonant sidebands.

== Recordings ==
- Rosalind Bevan, Yvar Mikashoff, Ole B. Ørsted (sound engineer: Mats Claessen; producer: Geir Johnson; executive producer: Foster Reed). CD recording. New Albion Records NAR 025. 1990.
- Andreas Grau, Götz Schumacher, Bryan Wolf (Tonmeister: Udo Wüstendörfer; sound engineer: Rüdiger Orth; producer: Ernstalbrecht Stiebler) – 1995, "Mantra, für 2 pianisten". Wergo/Schott Music. WER 62672.
- Janka Wyttenbach, Jürg Wyttenbach, Thomas Kessler (enregistrement: Jürg Jecklin; montage: Malgorzata Albinska; producer: Samuel Muller; mastering: Tritonus Studio [Peter Länger]) – 1997, Karlheinz Stockhausen: Mantra. Accord 4642692 (202252)
- Pascal Meyer, Xenia Pestova, Jan Panis (engineer and editor: Jarek Frankowski; recording supervisor: Andrew Lewis; producer: Remy Franck) – 2010, "Karlheinz Stockhausen: Mantra". Naxos 8.572398.
- Mark Knoop, Roderick Chadwick, Newton Armstrong (producer and sound engineer: David Lefeber; executive producers: Berhard "Benne" Vischer and Werner X. Uehlinger). Recorded 5 and 6 January 2013, Hall Two, Kings Place, London. CD recording. Hat[now]Art 190. Basel: Hat Hut Records, Ltd., 2014.

Two recordings were supervised by the composer:

- Aloys and Alfons Kontarsky, Karlheinz Stockhausen (sound engineer: Klaus Hiemann; producer: Rudolf Werner) – 1971, Karlheinz Stockhausen: Mantra DG LP 2530 208. Reissued 1991, "Stockhausen Complete Edition no. 16: Mantra". Karlheinz Stockhausen Official Website.
- Ellen Corver, Sepp Grotenhuis, Hans Tutschku (sound engineers: Bert Kraaijpoel, Jan Panis; producer: Maarten Hartveldt; digital editing: Chapel Studio Tilburg [Jan Panis, Hans Tutschku, Maarten Hartveldt]) – [1995], Stockhausen: Mantra, Supervised by Karlheinz Stockhausen TMD 950601. This recording received an Edison Classical Award in 1996.
