= Kraanerg =

Composition by Iannis Xenakis

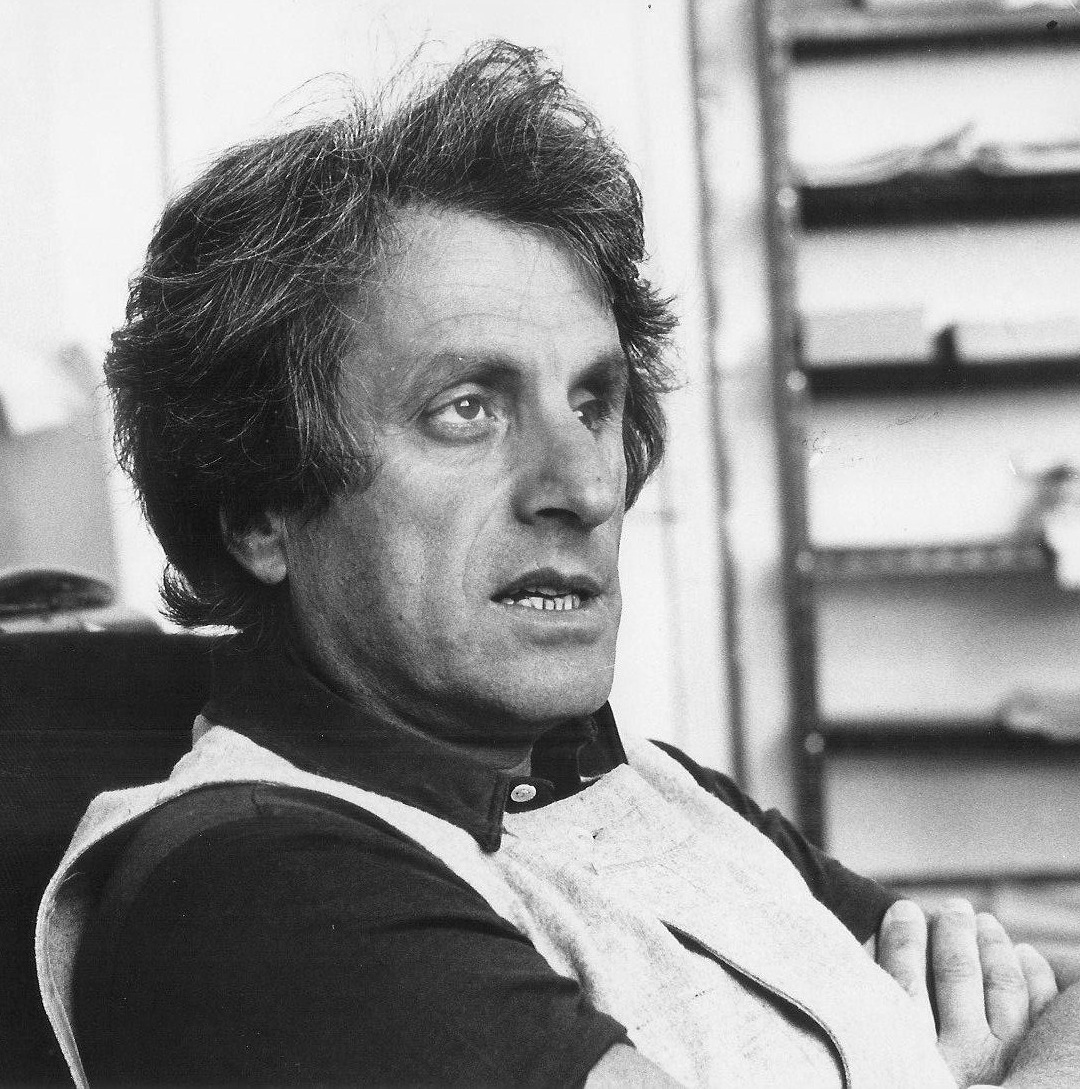
Iannis Xenakis in his Paris studio, c. 1970

Kraanerg is a composition for 23 instruments and 4-channel analog tape composed by Iannis Xenakis in 1968, as ballet, with choreography by Roland Petit and set design by Victor Vasarely. It was created for the grand opening of the Canadian National Arts Centre in Ottawa, intended to coincide with Expo 67. However, it was delayed to 1969.

== History ==
The title, by Xenakis, is an imaginary compound of the Greek-originating stems kraan (κρααν) and erg (εργ), meaning accomplished action. According to the composer's program note, the title also refers to the "current youth movements" of that time, and his vision of the imminent "biological struggle between generations unfurling all over the planet, destroying existing political, social, urban, scientific, artistic, and ideological frameworks on a scale never before attempted by humanity." Xenakis chose to avoid any narrative or story. The abstract modernistic character of the ballet was to be underscored by Vasarely's Op Art set design. Xenakis had previously written the soundtrack for a 1960 film about Vasarely.

The 75-minute composition is not divided into movements but includes twenty-two periods of silence of varying lengths (three of them more than twenty seconds) which are integral to the work's development. It has three phases of roughly equal duration: the first contains more or less, equal portions of both orchestra and tape; the second (beginning after 23 minutes), primarily instruments; and the third (beginning after 52 minutes) primarily tape. The sounds on the tape are derived from instrumental material.

Richard Toop described it as:

... the most overpowering, and yet one of the least known. It is one of the few works of Xenakis to place two media that he normally prefers to explore separately-electroacoustic music and the orchestra-in a situation of juxtaposition and confrontation ... In Kraanerg the musicians are in open combat with an electronic orchestra in absentia- a pre-recorded tape consisting mainly of transformed orchestral sounds which seem to evoke both antiquity and the future, thus hemming in the presence of the live orchestra.

The choreography by Petit (who was in charge of the premiere, and divided the work at its midpoint with an intermission) was a critical failure, but the music was widely praised; it was conducted at the premiere by Lukas Foss, who like Vasarely was invited to the project by Xenakis.

After a tour of the original ballet that ended in 1972, Kraanerg was largely forgotten until 1988 when a new choreography was created the Australian choreographer Graeme Murphy with Roger Woodward directing twenty-five performances at the Sydney Opera House. This performance was highly considered abroad and attracted attention to the composition again. The music has usually been performed without the ballet.

== Discography ==
- 1969: Iannis Xenakis: Syrmos; Polytope; Medea; Kraanerg; Terretektorh; Nomos gamma; Bohor I; Diamorphoses II; Orient-occident III; Concret P-H II. Ensemble Ars Nova de l'O.R.T.F., Marius Constant (cond.) (Syrmos; Polytope; Medea; Kraanerg); Choeur d'Hommes de l'O.R.T.F. (Medea); Orchestre Philharmonique de l'O.R.T.F., Charles Bruck (cond.) (Terretektorh; Nomos gamma). The remainder are for tape alone. Terretektorh recorded at the Gymnase de Drancy on 24 January 1968; Nomos gamma recorded at the Festival de Royan in April 1969. LP recording, 5 audio discs: analog, 33⅓ rpm, stereo, 30 cm. Erato STU 70526/70527/70528/70529/70530. [France]: Erato.
- 1989: Iannis Xenakis: Kraanerg. Alpha Centauri Ensemble, Roger Woodward (cond.), with tape. Recorded in the Opera Theatre of the Sydney Opera House, 24 November 1988. 1 compact disc: digital, stereo, 12 cm. Etcetera KTC 1075. [Amsterdam]: Etcetera.
- 1997: Iannis Xenakis: Kraanerg. ST-X Ensemble, Charles Zacharie Bornstein (cond.), with tape (Paul D. Miller, quadraphonic ADAT). Recorded live in New York City at the Great Hall in Cooper Union on 12 November 1996, with the composer present. 1 compact disc: digital, stereo, 12 cm. Asphodel/Sombient 0975. New York: Asphobel/Sombient.
- 2003: Iannis Xenakis: Kraanerg. Sinfonieorchester Basel, Alexander Winterson (cond.), with tape. Recorded in the Casino Basel Music Hall, 29–31 May 2001. 1 compact disc: digital, stereo, 12 cm. Col Legno WWE 1CD 20217. [Munich]: Col Legno.
- 2008: Iannis Xenakis: Kraanerg. Callithumpian Consort, Stephen Drury (cond), with tape. Recorded at Jordan Hall, New England Conservatory, Boston, Massachusetts, on 7 March 2006. Xenakis Edition 8. 1 compact disc: digital, stereo, 12 cm. Mode 196. New York: Mode Records. Also issued on Surround DVD.

== See also ==
- Polytope de Montréal, 1967 media installation by Xenakis in Ottawa
