= Corona (Takemitsu) =

Composition for piano by Toru Takemitsu

- by Toru Takemitsu
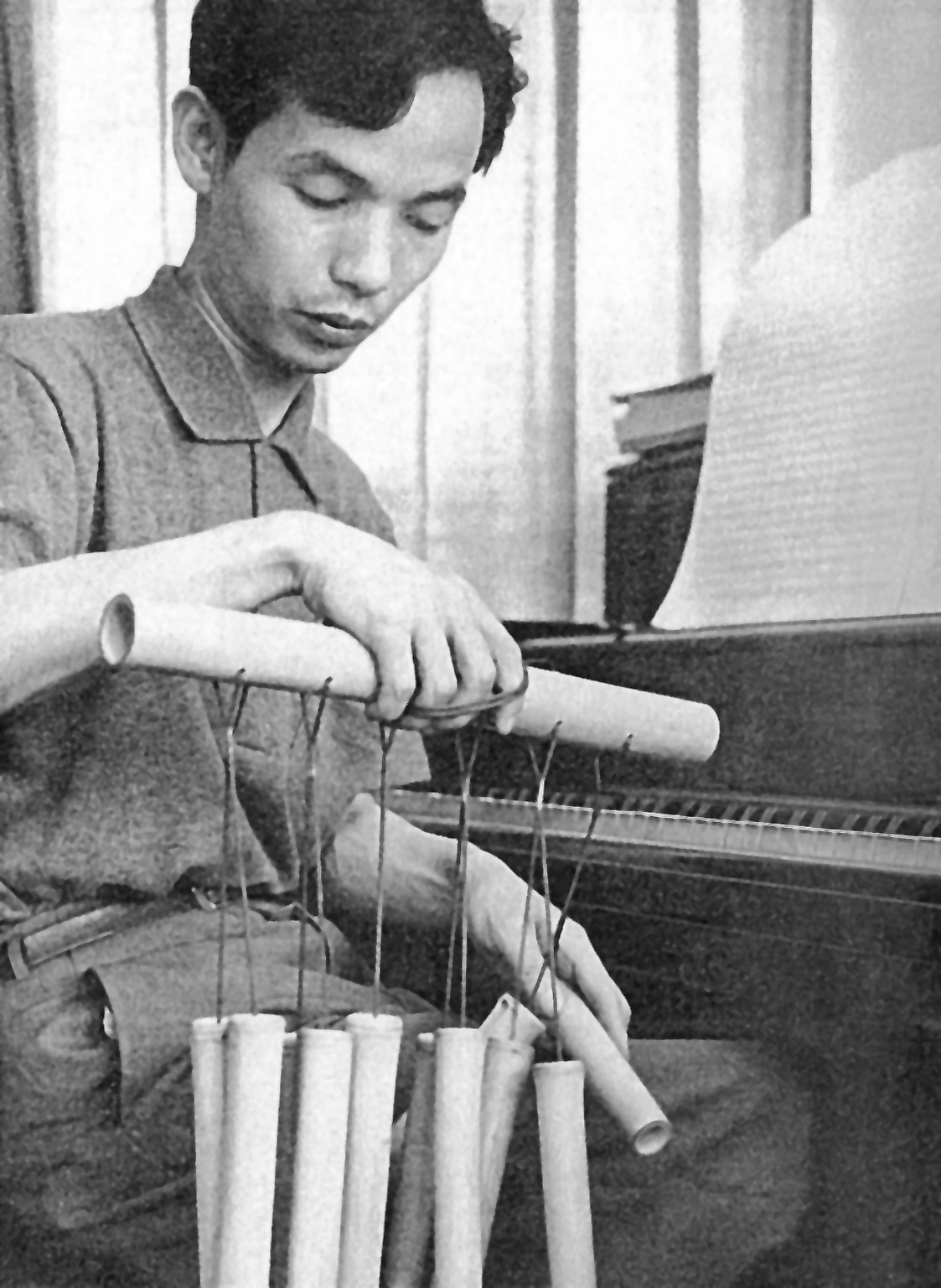
- Toru Takemitsu, 1961
- Catalogue: W32 (Siddons)
- Composed: 1962
- Movements: 5
- Scoring: One or multiple pianists

Corona is an experimental classical composition for one or multiple pianists by Japanese composer Toru Takemitsu. It was finished in 1962.

== Composition ==
Takemitsu, who was a largely self-taught composer, was a composer who focused most of his career (and especially his early works) on an impressionistic style that he would further develop as he gained artistic maturity. After coming back from studying with Toshi Ichiyanagi, who had been learning with American avant-garde composer John Cage, he entered a period of what scholars have entitled the Cage shock. In this period, Takemitsu became particularly fascinated with graphic scores, which are scores that reject any of the traits in traditional musical notation. In this way, traditional notation provided a way to discern and to identify compositions, as notes are merely a large set of rules by which a particular musical piece has to be performed. However, graphic scores allowed the performer more freedom, and each performer made each composition's performance unique and particular, as the performer alone must make important decision when attempting to understand and to realize the composition.

During this period, Takemitsu wrote four compositions with graphic scores, some of them in collaboration with Japanese artist Kōhei Sugiura. These compositions are Ring, for Flute, Guitar and Lute (1961), Corona, for pianist (1962), Corona II, for a string orchestra (1962), and Arc, for Strings (1963). Even though Takemitsu used traditional notation in Ring, no traditional notation is found on Corona. This composition has received a catalogue number W32 by James Siddons. The composition was completed in February, 1962, and premiered in Tokyo that same month, with Toshi Ichiyanagi and Yuji Takahashi at the piano. The composition was first published by Éditions Salabert in 1972, and has been republished frequently until today.

== Structure ==
Score of the first etude, "Study for Vibration". Note the different characteristics of graphic notation.

The whole composition takes around 22 minutes to perform. It is divided into five different etudes, which are the five "coronas" or graphic scores. However, in recordings, it is usually put into one movement. The movement list is as follows:

1. Study for Vibration, possibly slow (blue).
2. Study for Intonation, 2 or 4 minutes (red).
3. Study for Articulation, possibly fast (yellow).
4. Study for Expression, 1, 3 or 5 minutes (grey).
5. Study for Conversation, free tempo (white).

These five etudes, or coronas, are five circles in which several techniques are indicated for the performer to choose from. Given the unusual nature of the piece, the realization is open to interpretation. The piece has a short rhythmic and melodic motif which is stated in the first study alone, the only corona in which specific pitches are identified. According to Takemitsu, each corona is to be started "at any point of the perimeter (of the circle), no matter clockwise or counterclockwise".

== Recordings and performances ==
The first commercial recording of Corona was released in 1973, performed by Yuji Takahashi, who had premiered the work in Tokyo in 1962. A performance by Roger Woodward was released in 1974, entitled the London Version. In this version, Woodward created four separate tracks: two tracks where he played the piano, one track where he played the celesta, and one where he played an organ. Then, he mixed all the tracks and used the recurring rhythmic and melodic motif in the first etude all along the recording. After the first etude, he adds the organ in the background, where it remains until the end of the piece. Woodward made another live version in 1990, in which he was accompanied by Rolf Gehlhaar at the bowed cymbal. In this version, Takemitsu's Crossing was performed simultaneously.

On July 11, 2006, Jim O'Rourke created a Japan-only realization of the work. He recorded what would later be called the Tokyo Realizations, two recordings of the piece which were mixed into the final version of his realization of Takemitsu's work.
