= Keqrops =

- by Iannis Xenakis
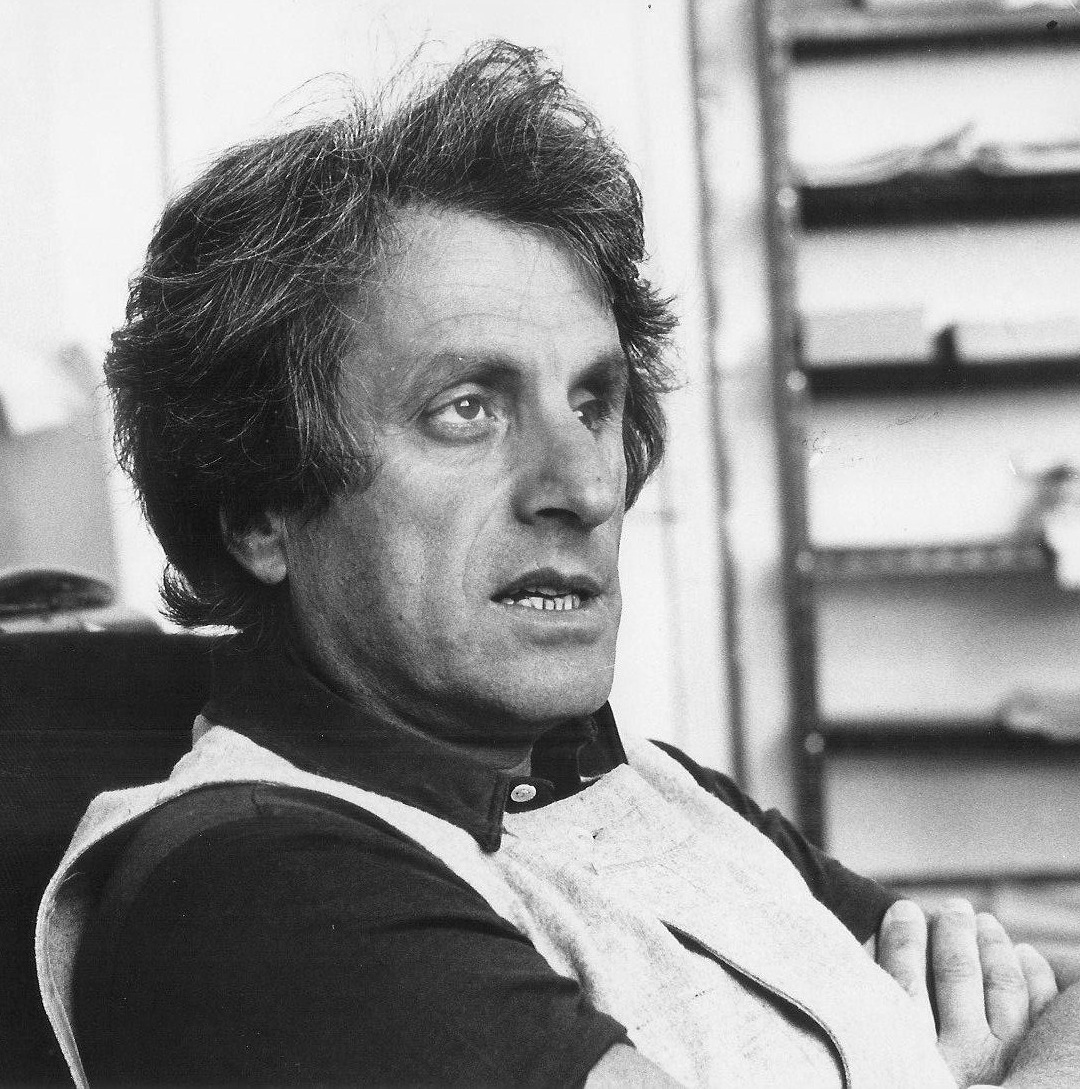
- Iannis Xenakis c. 1970
- Genre: Contemporary music
- Form: Piano concerto
- Performed: 13 November 1986: New York
- Published: 1987: Paris
- Scoring: Piano and orchestra

Keqrops (Greek: Κέκροψ, also incorrectly entitled by the composer Κεqροψ, which can be translated as weaving) is a composition for piano and orchestra by Greek/French composer Iannis Xenakis. Due to the prominent role of the piano soloist, it has often been classified as a piano concerto. It was completed in 1986.

== Composition ==
The composition was commissioned by Phynea Paroufakis and Peter Paroufakis from Australia for the pianist Roger Woodward, the New York Philharmonic, and conductor Zubin Mehta, who gave it a first performance on 13 November 1986 at the Lincoln Center in New York. The composition was published by Éditions Salabert in 1987.

According to the composer, the title of the composition, as most of his other works, is a compound from other Greek words and roots: krekoo (Ancient Greek: κρικόω, "to close or connect by using a "κρίκος" [ring]) and opsis (Ancient Greek: ὄψις, "appearance, sight, vision"). Xenakis translated the title as weaving. However, Xenakis gave the title a second meaning. He also refers to the legend from the Mycenaean era of Cecrops I, originally from Sais in Egypt, who, in a reign of 50 years, introduced civilization into Attica, fortified the Acropolis of Athens and divided the people into four tribes.

== Structure ==
The composition is in one movement and takes approximately 16 minutes to perform. It is scored for a solo piano and a large orchestra consisting of four flutes, four oboes, four clarinets in B-flat, four bassoons, four French horns in F, four trumpets in C, four trombones, one tuba, one harp, timpani, a percussion section consisting of two bongos, three tom-toms and one bass drum and a large string section consisting of sixteen first violins, fourteen second violins, twelve violas, ten cellos and eight double basses. The instruments are not allowed to play vibrato during the whole composition. The tempo of the composition is ♩ ≙ 48 mm, as marked in the score.

In this piece, the piano and the three families of the orchestra (that is, strings, woodwind and brass) are equal strands of the whole composition. Unlike a typical piano concerto, the structure of the composition does not have ritornello segments or dialogue between the orchestra and the solo piano. Xenakis used large tone clusters. In some instances, entire melodic phrases are played as "cluster lines", with players taking the same melody one semi-tone apart from their neighbour.

== Reception ==
In a review for Tempo, Nouritza Matossian praised the work's "glistening sonorities and brilliant and transparent colours," and commented: "I have never heard a work from Xenakis which so strongly asserted its own entity from beginning to end. The moment it was finished I wanted to hear it again."
