= Qu Xiao-Song =

Chinese composer

Qu Xiao-Song (瞿小松; surname Qu, b. Guiyang, Guizhou province, southwest China, September 6, 1952) is a Chinese composer of contemporary classical music.

He is a 1983 graduate of the Central Conservatory of Music in Beijing, where he studied composition with Du Mingxin. In 1989 he was invited by the Center for US-China Arts Exchange of Columbia University in New York City to be a visiting scholar, and he continues to live in New York City.

He has received commissions from the Holland Festival, American Composers Forum, Hong Kong Chinese Orchestra, and Boston Musica Viva. His operas Oedipus and The Death of Oedipus were premiered in 1993 and 1994 respectively, in Stockholm and Amsterdam. His chamber opera The Test (2004) was commissioned by the Munich Biennale and Contemporary Opera Berlin, and performed in both cities in May 2004.

His name is sometimes also written Qu Xiaosong.

== Music ==
=== Chamber music ===
- Cello Concerto for cello and chamber ensemble
- Cursive, violoncello and percussion ensemble
- Ji No. 1, large mixed ensemble
- Ji No. 2, Floating Clouds, mixed quartet, Asian instrument and ensemble
- Ji No. 3: Silent Mountain, solo guitar or Asian instrument
- Ji No. 4, percussion solo
- Ji No. 5, Asian instrument and ensemble
- Ji No. 6, percussion ensemble, large mixed ensemble
- Ji No. 7, solo violin or violoncello
- Lam Mot, percussion ensemble
- String Symphony, string orchestra
- The Girl of the Mountain, string solo and orchestra
- Xi, percussion ensemble

=== Orchestral works ===
- Cello Concerto for cello and full orchestra
- Symphony No. 1
- Huan
- The Mountain

=== Vocal works ===
- Fang Yan Kou, low voice and ensemble
- Mist, vocal soloists and ensemble
- Mist 2, high voice and ensemble
- Mist 3, high voice and ensemble
- Mong Dong, low voice and ensemble
- Weisst du wie der Regen klingt.../Rain, mixed chorus and ensemble

=== Oratorio ===
- Cleaving the Coffin: Oratorio, mixed chorus, vocal soloists and ensemble

=== Opera ===
- Life on a String
- Oedipus
- The Death of Oedipus
- The Test

== Trivia ==
- Qu dated the Chinese actress Bai Ling in the mid-1990s.
- Qu was married to Chinese play writer Lan Wu in The 1990s-2020s.
- Qu’s two daughters are both cellists, Vivian Qu (b. 2006) and Emma Wu Qu (b. 2008). Both mostly active in Sweden.
- Qu spend a few stay at home parents years in Stockholm Sweden in the 2010s-2020s.
- Qu now has returned back to his career in Asia.
