= Triadic Memories (Feldman) =

Solo piano piece by Morton Feldman

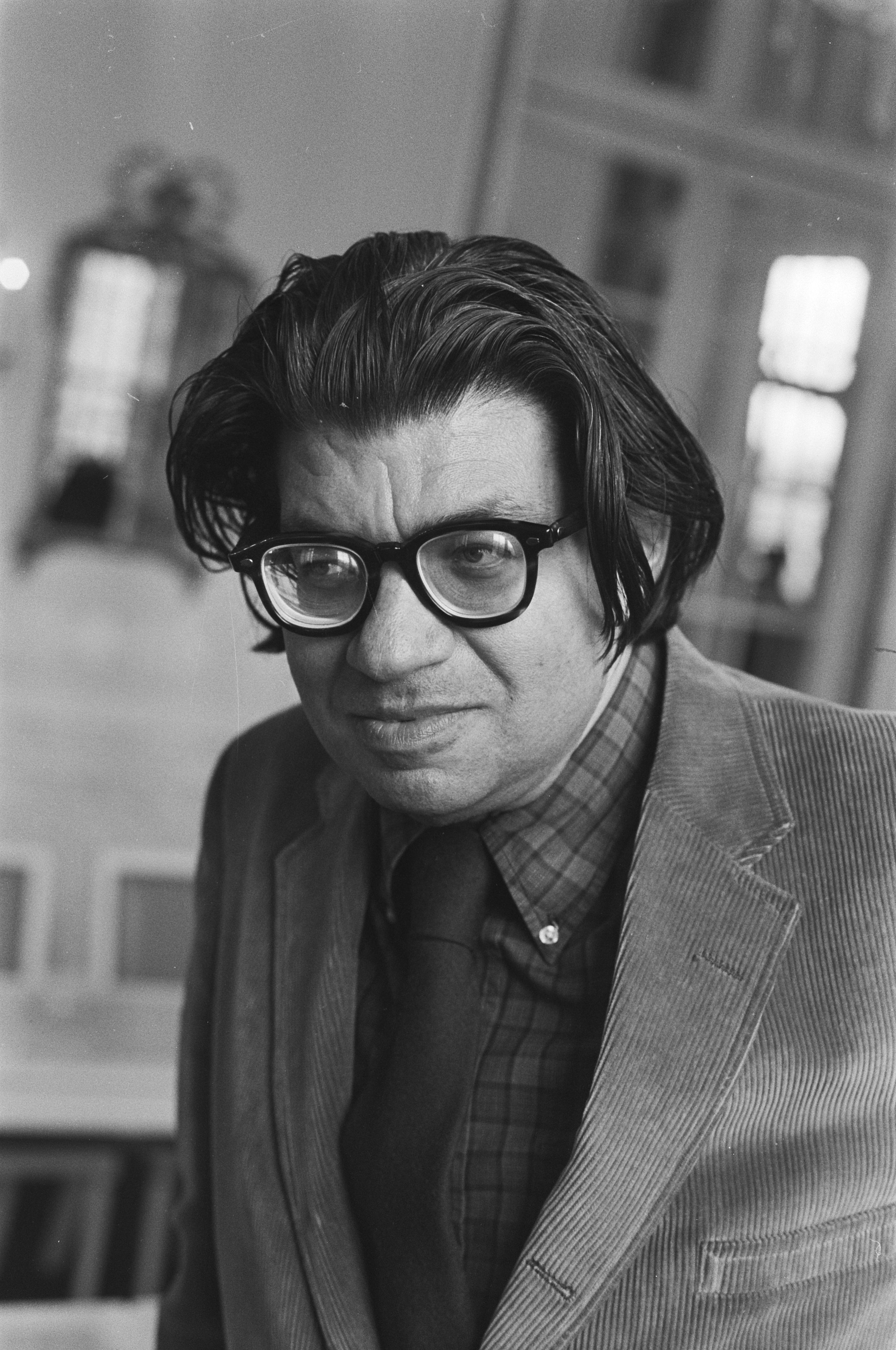
Morton Feldman in 1976

Triadic Memories is a solo piano piece composed by the American composer Morton Feldman in 1981, jointly dedicated to the classical pianists Roger Woodward and Aki Takahashi. This piece heralds the composer's late period and lasts around 90 minutes. The score of Triadic Memories is published by Universal Edition (London) Ltd UE 17326. Woodward performed the world premiere at the ICA London, UK, October 5, 1981, in the presence of the composer and the French premiere at the 1997 Festival d’automne à Paris au Théâtre Molière. Triadic Memories is one of three major works (the others are Piano and Orchestra and Piano) that Feldman wrote for, and dedicated to, Roger Woodward. His performance of Piano, Triadic Memories, Two Pianos, Piano Four Hands and of Piano Three Hands with Ralph Lane for the Australian Broadcasting Corporation (Sound Recording 1990) was licensed to Etcetera Records BV (1991) KTC 2015 and awarded Le Diapason d’or.

Takahashi performed the American premiere at SUNY-Buffalo in 1982, also in the presence of the composer, who described the way of working on the piece as:

a conscious attempt at ‘formalizing’ a disorientation of memory. Chords are heard repeated without any discernible pattern. In this regularity (though there are slight gradations of tempo) there is a suggestion that what we hear is functional and directional, but we soon realize that this is an illusion: a bit like walking the streets of Berlin – where all the buildings look alike, even if they’re not.

Music historian Steven Johnson compares the piece to Samuel Beckett's Molloy, citing Becket and Feldman's collaboration and common themes of aimlessness, uncertainty, disintegration, and paralysis.

The piece has been performed in 2015 by Alexander Melnikov at Wigmore Hall in London. In 2026 Amy Williams is performing the piece in Oakland and New York for celebrations of Feldman's 100th birthday.
