= Richard Toop =

British-Australian musicologist

Richard Toop (1 August 1945 – 19 June 2017) was a British-Australian musicologist.

Toop was born in Chichester, England, in 1945. He studied at Hull University, where his teachers included Denis Arnold.

In 1973 he became Karlheinz Stockhausen's teaching assistant at the Staatliche Hochschule fur Musik in Cologne. In 1975 he moved to Sydney, Australia, where he was head of musicology at the Sydney Conservatorium (University of Sydney). His publications include a monograph on György Ligeti, and the New Grove entries on Stockhausen and Brian Ferneyhough. As a young pianist in 1967, he gave in a 24-hour marathon in London the first documented solo performance of Vexations by Erik Satie.

Toop died on 19 June 2017 at the age of 71.
