= Andy Williams discography =

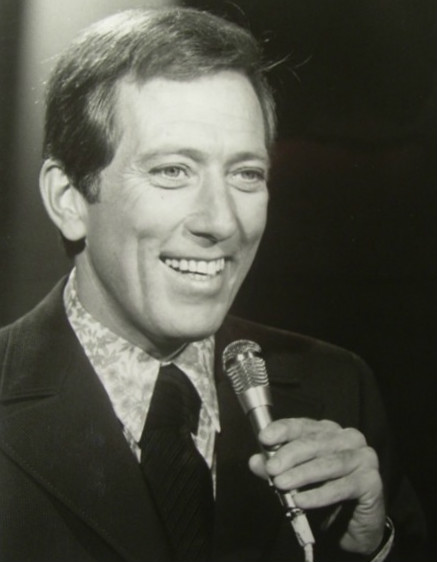
- Andy Williams in 1969
- Studio albums: 43
- Live albums: 2
- Compilation albums: 28
- Singles: 79

Andy Williams recorded 43 studio albums, 17 of which (along with the 1970 compilation Andy Williams' Greatest Hits) received Gold certification from the Recording Industry Association of America for selling 500,000 units. Andy Williams has sold over 11 million records in the US alone. Three of those recipients went on to reach one million in sales, for which they were awarded Platinum certification. Between studio, Christmas, and compilation albums he had 37 entries on the pop albums chart in Billboard magazine with 12 of those making the top 10. One of those 12, his 1963 album Days of Wine and Roses and Other TV Requests, spent 16 weeks at number one and comes in at number five on the list of the top albums released in the 1960s in terms of Billboard chart performance. During the 1960s and early 1970s two of his Platinum LPs, The Andy Williams Christmas Album and Merry Christmas, made annual appearances on the magazine's Christmas Albums chart, where they each reached the number one position in multiple holiday seasons. In a ranking of the top album artists of the 1960s in terms of Billboard chart performance, he comes in at number eight.

Williams also recorded 47 songs that reached Billboard magazine's Hot 100 chart in the United States and another eight that "bubbled under" the Hot 100. Nine of these 54 recordings made the top 10 (including 1957's "Butterfly", which spent three weeks at number one), and 32 of them are also on the list of 44 entries that Williams had on the magazine's Easy Listening chart, which was started in 1961. 19 of those 44 songs made the top 10 on that list, and four of them ("Can't Get Used to Losing You", "In the Arms of Love", "Happy Heart", and "(Where Do I Begin) Love Story") went on to number one. In a ranking of Billboard's top Adult Contemporary chart performers from 1961 to 1969, he comes in at number five.

In 1963 the Williams recording of "White Christmas" was released to promote The Andy Williams Christmas Album and spent the last five weeks of the year at number one on Billboard's Christmas Singles chart. The album also included "It's the Most Wonderful Time of the Year", which was written for The Andy Williams Show and became a staple of his annual Christmas specials. Although covers of the song he originated by artists such as Garth Brooks and Harry Connick, Jr. had single chart runs in Billboard upon initial release, the recording by Williams began to enjoy widespread popularity several decades after it debuted. Its first appearance on a weekly singles chart was in the UK in 2007, and his recording returned to the UK chart each holiday season for many years to follow, reaching a peak position at number 17 in 2017. When Billboard started its Holiday 100 chart in 2011, the Williams classic began annual appearances there and had its best showing in 2018 when it got as high as number two, and in 2016, after the magazine changed its Hot 100 rules regarding older songs, "Most" began returning there each December as well and also hit a high point during the 2020 holiday season when it reached number 5.

Since the British Phonographic Industry began its awards in 1973 Williams had 12 albums receive Silver certification for selling 60,000 units in the UK, and Six of those albums eventually sold the 100,000 units necessary for receiving Gold certification. On the UK album chart he had 30 entries with 11 of those making the top 10. He also had 24 recordings that reached the UK singles chart with nine of those reaching the top 10, including "Butterfly", which spent two weeks at number one.

== Label X and the Cadence years ==
Williams's first recordings as a solo artist were done in two sessions for the RCA Victor subsidiary Label X in the mid-1950s. Two songs were recorded at the first session, "Groundhog" and "There Is a Time", but according to Williams, "Nothing came of this date.... The numbers are still on the shelf." The four songs from the other session produced two singles: "Why Should I Cry Over You?"/"You Can't Buy Happiness" and "Now I Know"/"Here Comes That Dream Again". In 1967 Williams described something he learned in moving from RCA to Cadence Records in 1955: "I realized that what I had done for Label X wasn't the right kind of product -- in fact, the proof of this is that even years later, when I was selling big on Columbia, those sides were never reissued on RCA."

When Williams arrived at Cadence on December 1, 1955, label founder Archie Bleyer immediately had him record two holiday songs, "The Wind, the Sand and the Star" and "Christmas Is a Feeling in Your Heart". But Williams explains in his autobiography that his new boss "didn't get the record released until a few days before Christmas" and that "it sold only 10,000 copies." His next single, however, included his first song to reach the Billboard Hot 100, "Walk Hand in Hand", and it became the first of half a dozen hits to be packaged together with their corresponding B-sides on his first compilation album, which was simply entitled Andy Williams.

For his first studio album Williams decided to pay tribute to the songwriting talent of his Tonight Show colleague Steve Allen because, he explains, "I thought that if I recorded an album of Steve's own compositions, he might let me sing one or two on the show." Allen, in fact, had Williams eventually perform the entire album on the show by having him sing a different song each night. Williams turned to the popular duo of Richard Rodgers and Oscar Hammerstein II for his second Cadence LP, which included songs from their Broadway musicals Carousel, The King and I, Oklahoma!, and South Pacific. Indeed, each of the long players he made for the label had its own specific focus, such as songs from Hawaii or France, and it was during this phase that he recorded Lonely Street, his first release to reach the pop albums chart in Billboard magazine.

The singles that Williams recorded for Cadence charted much more frequently. Of his 16 A-sides that made the Billboard Hot 100 and its predecessors during this period, 11 of them made it into the top forty positions on the chart, and six of those reached the top ten. Some of these hits fit in nicely with the ballads or what is now called the traditional pop format of many of his LPs at the time. In fact three of the more successful songs from this era ("The Hawaiian Wedding Song", "Lonely Street", and "The Village of St. Bernadette") inspired the themes of the albums on which they later appeared. But several singles, including "Butterfly", "I Like Your Kind of Love", and "Lips of Wine", followed the burgeoning rock and roll trend. "Archie wasn't trying to turn me into a poor man's Elvis; he was just trying to find hit songs. If they were rock and roll, then he wanted them sung that way."

== The Columbia years ==
Williams's move to Columbia Records in 1961 heralded the start of a highly successful series of albums produced by Robert Mersey that focused on standards, including many from stage and screen, with some Easy Listening hits of the day eventually becoming part of the formula. One of these projects, 1962's Moon River and Other Great Movie Themes, became his first album to reach the top 10 on Billboard's Top LPs chart and his earliest recording to receive Gold certification from the Recording Industry Association of America. His chart-topping Days of Wine and Roses and Other TV Requests (which included his number two pop hit "Can't Get Used to Losing You") also reached the half million mark in sales, as did the next five consecutive top 10 albums and two number one Christmas LPs on which Mersey also did much of the arranging and conducting. His top 10 release from 1966, The Shadow of your Smile, featured covers of the Beatles songs "Michelle" and "Yesterday" and foreshadowed the shift that Williams would be making over the next few years toward contemporary material. His next LP, In the Arms of Love, peaked only as high as number 21, making it his lowest charting studio album with Columbia to date and helping to explain why it didn't sell enough to receive Gold certification. After 12 projects with Mersey at the helm, Williams moved on to work with producers that could accommodate his more modern aspirations.

He began his next string of Gold records in 1967 with Born Free, which relied exclusively on recent hits from the pop and Easy Listening charts and became the first of five more top 10 albums he would release. When Clive Davis became President of Columbia Records that same year, he paid close attention to the label's Easy Listening artists since most of them were experiencing a decline in sales. "Only Williams was really keeping current. He was open to the new, younger writers that were emerging." One of the musical directors of The Andy Williams Show, Jack Elliott, had made note of the singer's musical taste in 1967 as well: "Andy constantly wants to do new material. If anything, the only professional criticism I would have is that I think he reaches too hard for today's stuff." But in retrospect Davis takes on part of the responsibility for trying to appeal to young record buyers. "I urged Andy to include only the most well-known of contemporary songs in his albums. I had carefully studied the sales of his albums, and it was a matter of mathematics: sales increased in proportion to the number of identifiable titles on the album cover. It became almost a formula."

The formula also worked well in the United Kingdom, where his next LP, Love, Andy, reached number one, and even as Williams was not charting and selling in the US in the 1970s as he had been, the numbers across the Atlantic remained impressive. The 1970 Andy Williams' Greatest Hits compilation reached number 42 during its 20 weeks on Billboard's list of the 200 Top LPs in America, but in the UK the album spent its first three weeks on their much smaller album chart at number 2 before eventually spending five of its 116 weeks there at number 1. His final top 10 LP in America, 1971's Love Story, went under the title Home Lovin' Man in the UK, where it reached number 1, and four more top 10 albums followed it onto the UK chart, including 1974's The Way We Were, which was the first of his 25 studio albums released by Columbia thus far that did not reach the Billboard charts. His popularity in the UK wasn't enough to sustain his relationship with Columbia much longer, and he recorded a few more albums that didn't receive wide attention before moving on.

== The post-Columbia years ==
In 1984, British record producers Tony Hiller and Nicky Graham enticed Williams back into the studio after a four-year hiatus to record Greatest Love Classics, a project in which the duo had written lyrics for selections of classical music. His next three albums revisited concepts with which he'd had varying degrees of success: movie songs on Close Enough for Love, Christmas music on I Still Believe in Santa Claus, and Country music on Nashville. In 1994 he released audio and video recordings of two concerts that were filmed at his Moon River Theater in Branson, Missouri. The CD Greatest Hits and corresponding video Andy Williams in Concert at Branson featured live performances of "Moon River", "Can't Get Used to Losing You", "Canadian Sunset", and many others, and The New Andy Williams Christmas Album and its video companion, The Andy Williams Christmas Show, offered many favorites from his holiday albums, including "White Christmas", on which he is joined by Lorrie Morgan and The Osmond Brothers. The following year he released an album of new holiday recordings entitled We Need a Little Christmas, which earned Williams his 18th and final RIAA-certified Gold album. His next return to the studio wasn't until 2006, when he recorded I Don't Remember Ever Growing Up, which was released in the UK the following year.

== Albums ==
=== Studio albums ===
Year	Title	Peak chart positions			Certifications
Year	Title	US	UK	Billboard Christmas Albums	Certifications
1956	Andy Williams Sings Steve Allen: Released: December 1956; Label: Cadence	—	—	—	
1958	Andy Williams Sings Rodgers and Hammerstein: Released: February 1958; Label: Cadence	—	—	—	
1959	Two Time Winners: Released: May 1959; Label: Cadence	—	—	—	
1959	To You Sweetheart, Aloha: Released: September, 1959; Label: Cadence	—	—	—	
1959	Lonely Street: Released: December, 1959; Label: Cadence	38	—	—	
1960	The Village of St. Bernadette: Released: March, 1960; Label: Cadence	—	—	—	
1960	Under Paris Skies: Released: October, 1960; Label: Cadence	—	—	—	
1962	Danny Boy and Other Songs I Love to Sing: Released: January, 1962; Label: Columbia	19	—	—	
1962	Moon River and Other Great Movie Themes: Released: March 26, 1962; Label: Columbia	3	—	—	RIAA: Gold
1962	Warm and Willing: Released: September, 1962; Label: Columbia	16	—	—	
1963	Days of Wine and Roses and Other TV Requests: Released: April 1963; Label: Columbia	1	16	—	RIAA: Gold
1963	The Andy Williams Christmas Album: Released: October 14, 1963; Label: Columbia	11	—	1	RIAA: Platinum BPI: Silver
1964	The Wonderful World of Andy Williams: Released: January 1964; Label: Columbia	9	—	—	RIAA: Gold
1964	The Academy Award–Winning "Call Me Irresponsible" and Other Hit Songs from the Movies: Released: Spring 1964; Label: Columbia	5	—	—	RIAA: Gold
1964	The Great Songs from "My Fair Lady" and Other Broadway Hits: Released: September 1964; Label: Columbia	5	30	—	RIAA: Gold
1965	Andy Williams' Dear Heart: Released: Spring 1965; Label: Columbia	4	4	—	RIAA: Gold
1965	Merry Christmas: Released: October 18, 1965; Label: Columbia	—	—	1	RIAA: Platinum
1966	The Shadow of Your Smile: Released: April 1966; Label: Columbia	6	24	—	RIAA: Gold
1966	In the Arms of Love: Released: December 19, 1966; Label: Columbia	21	—	—	
1967	Born Free: Released: April 10, 1967; Label: Columbia	5	22	—	RIAA: Gold
1967	Love, Andy: Released: October 16, 1967; Label: Columbia	8	1	—	RIAA: Gold
1968	Honey: Released: Spring 1968; Label: Columbia	9	4	—	RIAA: Gold
1969	Happy Heart: Released: Spring 1969; Label: Columbia	9	22	—	RIAA: Gold
1969	Get Together with Andy Williams: Released: October 6, 1969; Label: Columbia	27	13	—	RIAA: Gold

Year	Title	Peak chart positions			Certifications
Year	Title	US	UK	AUS	Certifications
1970	Raindrops Keep Fallin' on My Head: Released: Spring 1970; Label: Columbia	43	7	—	
1970	The Andy Williams Show: Released: Autumn 1970; Label: Columbia	81	10	—	
1971	Love Story: Released: February 3, 1971; Label: Columbia	3	1	26	RIAA: Platinum
1971	You've Got a Friend: Released: August 1971; Label: Columbia	54	—	—	
1972	Love Theme from "The Godfather": Released: March 21, 1972; Label: Columbia	29	11	—	RIAA: Gold
1972	Alone Again (Naturally): Released: September 1972; Label: Columbia	86	—	68	
1973	Solitaire: Released: Fall 1973; Label: Columbia	185	3	62	BPI: Gold
1974	The Way We Were: Released: Spring 1974; Label: Columbia	—	7	—	BPI: Silver
1974	Christmas Present: Released: October 11, 1974; Label: Columbia	203	—	—	
1974	You Lay So Easy on My Mind: Released: November 1974; Label: Columbia	150	—	—	BPI: Silver
1975	The Other Side of Me: Released: Summer 1975; Label: Columbia	—	60	—	
1976	Andy: Released: Autumn 1976; Label: Columbia	—	—	—	
1980	Let's Love While We Can: Label: Columbia	—	—	—	
1984	Greatest Love Classics: Label: EMI	—	22	—	BPI: Gold
1986	Close Enough for Love: Label: Atco	—	—	—	
1990	I Still Believe in Santa Claus: Label: Curb	—	—	—	
1991	Nashville: Label: Curb	—	—	—	
1995	We Need a Little Christmas: Label: Unison Music	—	—	—	RIAA: Gold
2007	I Don't Remember Ever Growing Up: Label: Demon Music Group	—	—	—	
"—" denotes a title that did not chart or was not released in that territory.

Notes:

*A: this album was re-released as an HD remaster in 2019

=== Album reissues ===
Many of the albums that Williams recorded were originally available in the vinyl LP, 8-track tape, Reel-to-reel, and audio cassette formats but were later reissued on compact disc. With close to 80 minutes of space available on each disc, it was possible to combine two albums on one CD, and most Williams albums have been paired up and reissued in this format, as shown in the collapsed table below:

Reissue CD released	Label	Album one	Year	Album two	Year						
Reissue CD released	Label	Album one	Year	Album two	Year	1990	Columbia	Moon River and Other Great Movie Themes	1962	Days of Wine and Roses and Other TV Requests	1963
Reissue CD released	1995	Sony	Can't Get Used to Losing You and Other Requests^{[A]}	1963	Love, Andy	1967					
1999	Sony	Warm and Willing	1962	The Shadow of Your Smile	1966						
1999	Collectables	The Academy Award–Winning "Call Me Irresponsible"...	1964	The Great Songs from "My Fair Lady"...	1964						
1999	Collectables	Andy Williams' Dear Heart	1965	The Shadow of Your Smile	1966						
1999	Collectables	Born Free	1967	Love, Andy	1967						
1999	Collectables	Honey	1968	Happy Heart	1969						
2000	Collectables	Andy Williams Sings Steve Allen	1956	Two Time Winners	1959						
2000	Collectables	Andy Williams	1958	Andy Williams Sings Rodgers and Hammerstein	1958						
2000	Collectables	Lonely Street	1959	The Village of St. Bernadette	1960						
2000	Collectables	Andy Williams' Best	1961	Under Paris Skies	1960						
2000	Collectables	Million Seller Songs	1962	To You Sweetheart, Aloha	1959						
2000	Sony	The Academy Award–Winning "Call Me Irresponsible"...	1964	The Great Songs from "My Fair Lady"...	1964						
2000	Sony	Honey	1968	Happy Heart	1969						
2001	Collectables	Days of Wine and Roses and Other TV Requests	1963	In the Arms of Love	1966						
2001	Sony	Danny Boy and Other Songs I Love to Sing	1962	Moon River and Other Great Movie Themes	1962						
2001	Sony	In the Arms of Love	1966	Born Free	1967						
2002	Collectables	Danny Boy and Other Songs I Love to Sing	1962	The Wonderful World of Andy Williams	1964						
2002	Collectables	Warm and Willing	1962	Andy Williams' Newest Hits	1966						
2002	Collectables	Raindrops Keep Fallin' on My Head	1970	Get Together with Andy Williams	1969						
2002	Collectables	The Andy Williams Show	1970	You've Got a Friend	1971						
2002	Collectables	Love Theme from "The Godfather"	1972	The Way We Were	1974						
2002	Collectables	Alone Again (Naturally)	1972	Solitaire	1973						
2002	Collectables	You Lay So Easy on My Mind	1974	The Other Side of Me	1975						
2003	Sony	Solitaire	1973	The First Time Ever (I Saw Your Face)^{[A]}	1972						
2004	Sony	You Lay So Easy on My Mind	1974	Let's Love While We Can	1980						
2007	Ace	Andy Williams	1958	Andy Williams Sings Steve Allen	1956						

- ^{A} title of UK version

=== Compilation albums ===
Several Williams compilations are noteworthy for either their chart success, as noted by 27 of them listed below, or the material included. For example, Williams himself selected the songs included on Moon River: The Very Best of Andy Williams.

Year	Title	Peak chart positions		Certifications
Year	Title	US	UK	Certifications
1958	Andy Williams: Label: Cadence	—	—	
1961	Andy Williams' Best: Label: Cadence	59	—	
1962	Million Seller Songs: Label: Cadence	54	—	
1965	Canadian Sunset: Label: Columbia	112	—	
1966	Andy Williams' Newest Hits: Label: Columbia	23	—	
1966	May Each Day: Label: CBS	—	11	
1969	The Andy Williams Sound of Music: Label: Columbia	139	22	
1970	Andy Williams' Greatest Hits: Label: Columbia	42	1	RIAA: Gold
1971	The Impossible Dream: Label: Columbia	123	26	
1971	Love Story (UK version): Label: CBS	—	11	
1972	Andy Williams' Greatest Hits Vol. 2 (UK version): Label: CBS	—	23	
1973	Andy Williams' Greatest Hits Vol. 2: Label: Columbia	174	—	
1977	Reflections: Label: CBS	—	2	BPI: Gold
1992	The Best of Andy Williams: Label: Dino	—	51	
1994	Personal Christmas Collection: Label: Legacy Recordings	115	—	
1995	16 Most Requested Songs: Encore!: Label: Legacy/Columbia	152	—	
1996	The Best of Andy Williams: Label: Sony Music (Columbia)	—	—	BPI: Silver
1997	The Love Songs: Label: Sony Music (Columbia)	—	—	BPI: Gold
1999	In the Lounge with...: Label: Columbia/Sony Music UK	—	39	BPI: Silver
2000	The Very Best of Andy Williams: Label: Columbia/Sony Music UK	—	27	BPI: Gold
2001	Andy: Label: Demon Music Group (Crimson)	—	—	BPI: Gold
2002	The Essential Andy Williams: Label: Columbia/Sony Music UK	—	32	
2003	B Sides and Rarities: Label: Collectables	—	—	
2005	Music to Watch Girls By: The Very Best of Andy Williams: Label: Sony Music Entertainment	—	50	
2009	Moon River: The Very Best of Andy Williams: Label: Columbia	—	—	
2009	The Very Best of Andy Williams: Label: Sony Music Entertainment	—	10	BPI: Gold
2013	The Classic Christmas Album: Label: Sony/ Legacy	23	—	
2020	Gold: Label: Demon Music Group	—	29	

=== Live albums ===
Two Williams concerts in 1993 became his first domestic releases of live material:

Year	Title	Peak chart positions			Certifications
Year	Title	US	Billboard Christmas Albums	Top Pop Catalog Albums	Certifications
1994	Greatest Hits: Label: Delta Music Inc. (LaserLight)	—	—	—	
1994	The New Andy Williams Christmas Album: Label: Delta Music Inc. (LaserLight)	137	31	32	
"—" denotes a title that did not chart or was not released in that territory.

=== Additional compilations ===
- Sings love ballad (1983), CBS Sony, Japan
- 16 Most Requested Songs (1986), Columbia
- Collection: Andy Williams (1987), CBS U.K.
- Portrait of a song stylist: Andy Williams (1989), Master piece Music
- Moon River (1990/1995/2002), CBS/Sony/Collectables
- Unchained Melody (1990/2011), Curb
- The Best of Andy Williams (1991), Curb
- Andy Williams: Best Collection (1991), Sony Music Japan
- Sings Songs of love (1992), GSC Music
- Blue Hawaii, Greatest Songs of the Island (1992), Curb
- Songs of Faith (1993), Sony Music Special Products
- The Way We Were (1993), Sony Music Special Products
- Essence of Andy Williams (1993), Columbia/Legacy
- Andy Williams: Great songs of the sixties (1993), Sony Music U.K.
- Wedding & Anniversary album (1994), Sony Music U.K.
- A World of Love (1995), Music Club
- His Greatest Hits and Finest Performances (1995), Reader's Digest
- I Like Your Kind of Love (1996), Varease Sarabande
- Best of Andy Williams (1997), Columbia
- Andy Williams: A Touch of Class (1997), Disky
- Andy Williams: The Cadence Collection (1998), Snapper Music
- Songs for Christmas (1998/2001), Sony Music Distribution
- Christmas Album (1999), Columbia Records/Sony Music UK
- Sings the Ballads (1999), Music Club
- 16 Biggest Hits (2000), Columbia/Legacy
- Super Hits (2001), Legacy/Sony Music Distribution
- The Complete Columbia Chart Singles Collection (2002), Taragon
- 25 All-Time Greatest Hits 1956–1961: The Cadence Years (2002), Varèse Sarabande
- The Great Andy Williams (2003), 3-CD set, Australia
- Classic Masters (2003), Capitol
- The Best of the 70s (2004), Sony/BMG
- Love Songs (2004), Columbia/Legacy
- This Is Gold (2004), Disky
- Very Best of Love (2004), Madacy
- Best of Andy Williams hits (2004), Sony Japan
- Best of Andy Williams standards (2004), Sony Japan
- Straight From the Heart (2005), Music Club
- Happy Heart: The Best of Andy Williams (2009), Sony UK
- 100 Hits Legends: Andy Williams (2009), Demon Music Group
- Songs I Never Recorded (2010), Barnaby
- Great Hit Sounds: I Like Your Kind of Love (2011), Jasmine
- Very Best of Andy Williams(Playlist) (2013), Columbia/Legacy
- Andy Williams Swings: Great American Songbook (2013), Performance
- Complete Singles A's & B's :1954-1962 (2017), Acrobat
- Emperor of Easy: Lost Columbia Masters 1962–1972 (2020), Real Gone Music
- Andy Williams: The Ultimate Collection (2020), TJL Productions
- When You Fall In Love - Lost Columbia Masters 1977-1982(2024), Real Gone Music

=== Additional Albums released only in Japan ===
- Andy Williams In Japan (1967), Nippon Columbia
- An Evening with Andy Williams on May 15 & 16 in 1973 at Oska Kosei Nenkin Kaikan (1973) 2-LP set, Sony. Japan

=== Album collaboration ===
- The Williams Brothers Christmas Album (1971), Barnaby

=== Album narration ===
- It's a Wonderful Christmas (1997), Publishing Mills

=== Box sets ===
- Classic Album Collection, Vol. 1 (2001), Collectables
- Classic Album Collection, Vol. 2 (2002), Collectables
- Icons (2010), 4-CD set Sony UK
- Original Albums Collection Vol.1 (2013), 8-CD set, Sony Japan
- Original Albums Collection Vol.2 (2013), 8-CD set, Sony Japan
- The Ultimate Collection (2020), 4-CD set, TJL Productions

=== Radio broadcasts ===
- National Guard Shows (2010), Sounds of Yesteryear
- Young at heart with Hank Jones(2011) SSJ Japan
- Mademoiselle de Paris with Quincy Jones (2013) SSJ Japan

=== Soundtrack compilations ===
These releases are composed of performances taken from The Andy Williams Show:

- Andy Williams Live: Treasures from His Personal Collection (2001), Neon Tonic/Concord
- Andy Williams Live: Christmas Treasures (2001), Neon Tonic/Concord
- Andy Williams: Music to watch girls by: New collection of live recordings (2001), Music Club

== Singles ==
=== With Kay Thompson & the Williams Brothers (Columbia) (1948) ===
Year	Title	Peak chart positions			Non-charting B-sides Kay Thompson, solo	Album
Year	Title	Best Sellers in Stores	Most Played by Jockeys	Most Played in Jukeboxes	Non-charting B-sides Kay Thompson, solo	Album
1948	"Jubilee"	—	—	—	"Back Home Again in Indiana"	Non-album tracks
1948	"Louisiana Purchase"	—	—	—	"I See Your Face Before Me"	Non-album tracks

=== First solo singles (Label X) (1954–1955) ===
Year	Title	Peak chart positions			Non-charting B-sides	Album
Year	Title	Best Sellers in Stores	Most Played by Jockeys	Most Played in Jukeboxes	Non-charting B-sides	Album
1954	"Why Should I Cry Over You"	—	—	—	"You Can't Buy Happiness"	Non-album tracks
1955	"Now I Know"	—	—	—	"Here Comes That Dream Again"	Non-album tracks

=== Cadence singles (1955–1961) ===
Year	Title	Peak chart positions					Non-charting B-sides Same album as A-side unless indicated	Album
Year	Title	US	US CB	US AC	US R&B	UK	Non-charting B-sides Same album as A-side unless indicated	Album
1955	"Christmas Is a Feeling in Your Heart"	—	—	—	—	—	"The Wind, the Sand and the Star"	Non-album tracks
1956	"Walk Hand in Hand"	54	16	—	—	—	"Not Anymore"	Andy Williams
1956	"Canadian Sunset"	7	2	—	—	—	"High Upon a Mountain"	Andy Williams
1956	"Baby Doll"	33	35	—	—	—	"Since I've Found My Baby"	Andy Williams
1957	"Butterfly"	1	3	—	14	1	"It Doesn't Take Very Long"	Andy Williams
1957	"I Like Your Kind of Love"	8	10	—	—	16	"Stop Teasin' Me"	Andy Williams
1957	"Lips of Wine"	17	20	—	—	—	"Straight From My Heart"	Andy Williams
1958	"Are You Sincere?"	3	7	—	—	—	"Be Mine Tonight" (from Two Time Winners)	Andy Williams' Best
1958	"Promise Me, Love"	17	33	—	—	—	"Your Hand, Your Heart, Your Love"	Non-album tracks
1958	"Hawaiian Wedding Song"/ "The House of Bamboo"	11 —	6; 86	—	27 —	—		Two Time Winners; Non-album track
1959	"Lonely Street"	5	7	—	20	—	"Summer Love"	Lonely Street
1959	"The Village of St. Bernadette"	7	9	—	—	—	"I'm So Lonesome I Could Cry" (from Lonely Street)	The Village of St. Bernadette
1960	"Wake Me When It's Over"	50	58	—	—	—	"We Have a Date (Andy's Theme)"	Non-album tracks
1960	"Do You Mind?"	70	53	—	—	—	"Dreamsville" (from Canadian Sunset)	Andy Williams' Best
1960	"You Don't Want My Love"	64	51	—	—	—	"Don't Go to Strangers" (A-side)	Andy Williams' Best
1961	"The Bilbao Song"	37	25	—	—	—	"How Wonderful To Know"	Andy Williams' Best
1962	"Twilight Time"	86	97	—	—	—	"So Rare"	Two Time Winners
1964	"Under Paris Skies"	121	—	—	—	—	"Let It Be Me"	Under Paris Skies

=== Columbia singles (1961–1981) ===
Year	Title	Peak chart positions					Non-charting B-sides Same album as A-side unless indicated	Album	Certifications
Year	Title	US	US CB	US AC	US R&B	UK	Non-charting B-sides Same album as A-side unless indicated	Album	Certifications
1961	"Danny Boy" / "Fly by Night"	64; 82	78; 73	15; 20	—	—		Danny Boy and Other Songs I Love to Sing; Non-album track	—
1962	"The Wonderful World of the Young" / "Help Me"	99 —	139; 113	—	—	—		Newest Hits; Non-album track	—
1962	"Stranger on the Shore"	38	10	9	—	30	"I Want to Be Wanted"	Warm and Willing	—
1962	"Don't You Believe It"	39	50	15	—	—	"Summertime" (from Danny Boy)	Newest Hits	—
1963	"Can't Get Used to Losing You" / "Days of Wine and Roses"	2; 26	1; 29	1; 9	7 —	2 —		Days of Wine and Roses and Other TV Requests	—
1963	"Hopeless" "The Peking Theme (So Little Time)"	13; 115	17 —	3 —	— —	— —		Non-album tracks	—
1963	"White Christmas"	—	81	—	—	—	"The Christmas Song"	The Andy Williams Christmas Album	—
1964	"Charade" / "A Fool Never Learns"	100; 13	— 13	— 4	— —	— 40		"Call Me Irresponsible" and Other Hit Songs from the Movies; The Wonderful World of Andy Williams	—
1964	"Wrong for Each Other"	34	27	11	—	—	"Madrigal" (from Call Me Irresponsible...)	Non-album track	—
1964	"Almost There" / "On the Street Where You Live"	67; 28	100; 40	12; 3	— —	2 —		Andy Williams' Dear Heart; The Great Songs From "My Fair Lady" and Other Broadway Hits	—
1964	"Dear Heart"	24	15	2	—	—	"Emily"	Andy Williams' Dear Heart	—
1965	"...and Roses and Roses"	36	34	4	—	—	"My Carousel" (from Andy Williams' Dear Heart)	Newest Hits	—
1965	"Ain't It True"	40	35	—	—	—	"Loved One"	Non-album tracks	—
1965	"Quiet Nights of Quiet Stars (Corcovado)"	92	97	18	—	—	"I'll Remember You"	Newest Hits	—
1966	"May Each Day"	—	—	—	—	19	"Bye Bye Blues" (from The Shadow of Your Smile)	May Each Day	—
1966	"Bye Bye Blues" / "You're Gonna Hear from Me"	127 —	123 —	18; 13	— —	— —		The Shadow of Your Smile; Non-album track	—
1966	"How Can I Tell Her It's Over"	109	109	17	—	—	"The Summer of Our Love" (from The Shadow of Your Smile)	Non-album track	—
1966	"In the Arms of Love"	49	72	1	—	33	"The Many Faces of Love" (Non-album track)	In The Arms of Love	—
1967	"Music to Watch Girls By"	34	50	2	—	33	"The Face I Love" (from In The Arms of Love)	Born Free	BPI: Silver
1967	"More and More"	88	100	2	—	45	"I Want to Be Free" (from Born Free)	Non-album track	—
1967	"Holly"	113	—	4	—	—	"When I Look In Your Eyes"	Love, Andy	—
1968	"Can't Take My Eyes Off You"	—	—	—	—	5	"You Are Where Everything Is" b/w (from Born Free)	Love, Andy	—
1968	"Sweet Memories"	75	82	4	—	—	"You Are Where Everything Is" b/w (from Born Free)	Non-album single version. Re-recorded version appears on Raindrops Keep Fallin' on My Head	—
1968	"The Battle Hymn of the Republic"	33	48	11	—	—	"Ave Maria"	non-album tracks	—
1969	"Happy Heart"	22	26	1	—	19	"Our Last Goodbye" (from Honey)	Happy Heart	—
1969	"Live and Learn"	119	111	12	—	—	"You Are" (from Get Together with Andy Williams)	Non-album track	—
1969	"A Woman's Way"	109	91	4	—	—	"What Am I Living For" (A-side)	Non-album tracks	—
1970	"Can't Help Falling in Love"	88	85	28	—	3	"Sweet Memories" (from Raindrops Keep Fallin' on My Head)	Non-album track	—
1970	"One Day of Your Life"	77	92	2	—	—	"Long Time Blues" (from Raindrops Keep Fallin' on My Head)	Non-album track	—
1970	"It's So Easy"	—	—	—	—	13	"Long Time Blues"	Raindrops Keep Fallin' on My Head	—
1970	"Home Lovin' Man"	—	—	10	—	7	"Whistling Away the Dark" (Non-album track)	Alone Again (Naturally)	—
1971	"(Where Do I Begin?) Love Story"	9	10	1	—	4	"Something"	Love Story	—
1971	"A Song for You"	82	95	29	—	—	"Holly" (from Love, Andy)	You've Got a Friend	—
1971	"Love Is All"	—	—	29	—	—	"What's the Matter Girl" (A-side)	Non-album tracks	—
1971	"You've Got a Friend"	—	—	—	—	—	"You Are Where Everything Is" (from Born Free)	You've Got a Friend	—
1972	"Music from Across the Way"	—	111	30	—	—	"The Last Time I Saw Her" (from Love Theme from "The Godfather")	Greatest Hits Vol. 2	—
1972	"Speak Softly Love (Love Theme from The Godfather)"	34	24	7	—	42	"Home For Thee" (Non-album track)	Love Theme from "The Godfather"	—
1972	"MacArthur Park"	102	114	26	—	—	"Amazing Grace" (from Alone Again (Naturally)	Love Theme from "The Godfather"	—
1972	"Home Lovin' Man"	—	—	27	—	—	"(Where Do I Begin) Love Story" (from Love Story)	Alone Again (Naturally)	—
1973	"Last Tango in Paris"	—	—	—	—	—	"I'll Never Be the Same" (Non-album track)	Solitaire	—
1973	"Solitaire"	—	—	23	—	4	"My Love"	Solitaire	—
1974	"Getting Over You" / "Remember"	— —	— 117	— 30	— —	35 —		Solitaire	—
1974	"Love's Theme"	—	—	16	—	—	"(They Long to Be) Close to You" (from The Impossible Dream)	The Way We Were	—
1974	"Another Lonely Song"	—	—	29	—	—	"A Mi Esposa Con Amor"	You Lay So Easy on My Mind	—
1975	"You Lay So Easy on My Mind"	—	—	—	—	32	"I Love My Friend"	You Lay So Easy on My Mind	—
1975	"Love Said Goodbye"	—	—	24	—	—	"One More Time"	Non-album tracks	—
1975	"Cry Softly"	—	—	20	—	—	"You Lay So Easy on My Mind"	You Lay So Easy on My Mind	—
1975	"Sad Eyes"	—	—	11	—	—	"Quits"	The Other Side of Me	—
1976	"The Other Side of Me"	—	—	—	—	42	"Goin' Through the Motions" (Non-album track)	The Other Side of Me	—
1976	"Tell It Like It Is"	72	85	17	—	—	"Goin' Through the Motions"	Non-album tracks	—
1977	"Are You In There" (Love Theme from "King Kong")	—	—	—	—	—	"Are You In There (disco version)"	Non-album tracks	—
1979	"Love Story (Where Do I Begin) (disco version - long)"	—	—	—	—	—	"Love Story (Where Do I Begin) (disco version - short)"	Non-album tracks	—
1979	"Love Theme from "Oliver's Story"	—	—	—	—	—	"Everytime I See Laureen"	Non-album tracks	—
1980	"Jason"	—	—	—	—	—	"I'll Never Love Anyone Anymore"	Let's Love While We Can	—
1980	"Amy Rainbow"	—	—	—	—	—	"It Was Time"	Non-album tracks	—
1981	"Regrets"	—	—	—	—	—	"Besides You"	Non-album tracks	—
1999	"Music to Watch Girls By"	—	—	—	—	9		The Very Best of Andy Williams	—
2003	"Can't Take My Eyes Off You" with Denise Van Outen	—	—	—	—	23	"Candida" (from Love Story) "Can't Take My Eyes Off You" (Original version)	The Essential Andy Williams	BPI: Silver

=== Curb singles (1991) ===
Year	Title	Peak chart positions	Album	Certifications
Year	Title	US CB Country	Album	Certifications
1991	"One Track Mem'ry"	84	Nashville	—

=== Holiday 100 chart entries ===
Since many radio stations in the US adopt a format change to Christmas music each December, many holiday hits have an annual spike in popularity during the last few weeks of the year and are retired once the season is over. In December 2011, Billboard began a Holiday 100 chart to "rank the top holiday hits of all eras using the same methodology as the Hot 100, blending streaming, airplay, and sales data." A handful of Williams recordings have made appearances on the Holiday 100 and are noted below according to the holiday season in which they charted there.

Title	Holiday season peak chart positions															Album
Title	2011	2012	2013	2014	2015	2016	2017	2018	2019	2020	2021	2022	2023	2024	2025	Album
"Do You Hear What I Hear?"	—	—	—	—	—	—	—	39	49	63	67	85	90	—	100	Merry Christmas
"The First Noël"	—	—	—	—	—	—	—	50	52	48	65	75	75	85	73	The Andy Williams Christmas Album
"Happy Holiday/The Holiday Season"	28	22	22	21	22	32	23	21	12	12	14	25	25	21	32	The Andy Williams Christmas Album
"It's the Most Wonderful Time of the Year"	8	6	7	10	12	5	3	2	5	4	5	5	6	6	6	The Andy Williams Christmas Album
"O Holy Night"	—	—	—	—	78	—	—	—	—	—	—	—	—	—	—	The Andy Williams Christmas Album
"Silver Bells"	—	—	—	—	—	—	—	36	48	73	36	65	59	73	72	Merry Christmas
"Sleigh Ride"	—	—	—	—	—	72	69	—	—	—	—	—	—	—	—	Merry Christmas

=== "It's the Most Wonderful Time of the Year" ===
The list of the "Top 10 Holiday Songs (Since 2001)" that was published by Billboard in 2009 ranked "It’s the Most Wonderful Time of the Year" at number five, and on the 2010 countdown of holiday songs receiving the most radio airplay as determined by the American Society of Composers, Authors and Publishers (ASCAP) the Williams classic came in at number four. In addition to its annual appearance on the Holiday 100, the original recording has also begun to show up on the pop singles charts for other countries and gave Williams his first top 10 pop hit in the US since 1971's "(Where Do I Begin) Love Story" when it reached number 10 on the Hot 100 in 2018. It also received Silver certification in the UK in 2016 and Gold certification there two years later. In 2019, it received Platinum certification and in 2022, double platinum. In December 2024 it received double Platinum certification from ARIA in Australia.

Holiday season	Peak chart positions																		
Holiday season	US	AUT	CAN	CZ	DEN	FRA	GER	GRE	HUN	IRE	ITA	NL	NZ	POR	SK	SPA	SWE	SWI	UK
2007	—	—	—	—	—	—	—	—	—	—	—	—	—	—	—	—	—	—	21
2008	—	—	—	—	—	—	—	—	—	—	—	—	—	—	—	—	—	—	63
2009	—	—	—	—	—	—	—	—	—	—	—	—	—	—	—	—	—	—	85
2010	—	—	—	—	—	—	—	—	—	—	—	—	—	—	—	—	—	—	—
2011	—	—	—	—	—	—	—	—	—	—	—	—	—	—	—	—	—	—	—
2012	—	—	—	—	—	—	—	—	—	—	—	—	—	—	—	—	42	—	—
2013	—	—	—	—	—	—	—	—	—	—	—	71	—	—	—	—	33	—	90
2014	—	—	—	—	—	—	—	—	35	75	—	69	—	—	—	—	51	—	61
2015	—	—	—	—	—	—	—	—	—	65	—	36	—	—	—	—	57	—	61
2016	48	—	43	—	—	—	86	—	35	29	—	20	—	85	—	—	31	68	24
2017	32	—	—	17	—	—	92	—	9	25	—	40	—	—	24	—	21	91	17
2018	10	46	21	10	36	186	42	13	7	21	94	10	14	23	5	78	19	28	29
2019	7	44	29	34	31	87	40	21	6	18	81	9	14	37	22	95	24	13	25
2020	5	25	7	23	27	76	22	7	39	16	48	5	—	13	8	70	15	19	23
2021	6	35	10	37	38	89	37	9	—	10	28	6	28	25	37	73	18	11	9
2022	6	22	7	29	24	37	24	13	—	9	21	8	13	17	10	59	9	11	10
2023	6	23	6	17	18	10	26	8	12	9	11	6	8	15	11	47	12	12	9
2024	7	26	5	63	25	14	34	15	18	13	6	4	9	118	21	32	10	14	11
2025	9	27	8	54	26	13	37	12	27	15	15	7	9	—	31	42	—	15	14
2026	47	—	48	—	—	—	—	—	—	75	—	—	—	—	—	—	—	—	65

== Recordings in other languages ==
Italian

- "Can't get used to losing you: Eri un Abitudine" (1963)

French

- "Love story: Une histoire d'amour"(1971)France CBS 7162

Spanish

- "Love story(Where do I begin)/Music from Across the Way"(1971) Columbia 4-45533
- "Love story(Where do I begin)Historia de Amor"(1971)Spain CBS 7188
- "Love Theme from the Godfather(Speak softly love) Tema de Amor de la Pelicula" (1972)Spain CBS 8262

Japanese

- "Love story(Where do I begin)"(1971) Sony Japan SONG 80200
- "Love theme from the Godfather(Speak softly love)" (1972)Sony Japan SOPA 25
- "Theme from Papillon(Free as the wind)" (1973)Sony Japan SOPB 289

== Recordings released only in Japan ==
- "Theme from Papillon(Free as the wind)/ I will" (1973)Sony Japan SOPB 280
- "Sunshine smile(Theme from the love of Benji)/Put your blues to bed" (1977)Sony Japan 06SP167

== Video releases ==
- Andy Williams Christmas Show (1993)
- In Concert at Branson (1994)
- Best of the Andy Williams Show (1999)
- Best of the Andy Williams Christmas Show (2001)
- Moon River & Me (2005)
- At the Royal Albert Hall (2007)
- Best of the Andy Williams Show (2007)8 DVD set
- My favorite duets (2011)
- Greatest love songs (2020) TJL
