= Andy Williams' Best =

Compilation album by Andy Williams
- Released: 1961
- Recorded: 1956–1961
- Genre: traditional pop; vocal pop; standards
- Length: 29:50
- Label: Cadence Records

Andy Williams chronology
Under Paris Skies (1960)	Andy Williams' Best (1961)	Danny Boy and Other Songs I Love to Sing (1962)

Andy Williams' Best is a compilation album by American pop singer Andy Williams that was released late in 1961 by Cadence Records. This second album to compile the singer's material features 10 songs that made the Billboard Hot 100 along with two of their corresponding B-sides.

The album made its first appearance on the Billboard Top LP's chart in the issue dated April 7, 1962, and remained there for 44 weeks, peaking at number 59. it also debuted on the Cashbox albums chart in the issue dated April 7, 1962, and spent an only week on the charts, peaking at 49

In 1965 Columbia Records released a compilation by Williams called Canadian Sunset whose cover had the phrase "formerly titled Andy Williams' Best" underneath the title, but his number one hit "Butterfly" and its top 10 follow-up "I Like Your Kind of Love" that were included on this album were replaced on the Columbia release with the B-sides of two of the other songs here.

Andy Williams' Best was issued on compact disc as one of two albums on one CD by Collectables Records on September 12, 2000, along with Williams's 1960 Cadence album, Under Paris Skies. Collectables included this CD in a box set entitled Classic Album Collection, Vol. 1, which contains 17 of his studio albums and three compilations and was released on June 26, 2001.

== Reception ==
Professional ratings
Review scores
Source	Rating
Allmusic	4/5 stars
The Encyclopedia of Popular Music	3/5 stars

William Ruhlmann of AllMusic's said that "it does contain the most successful ones. Cadence head Archie Bleyer carefully developed and expanded Williams' musical posture during the period, but the singles, mixed up as they are here, make that plan seem stylistically scattershot.

Billboard in its Spotlight of the Week album reviews stated that the album "features some of his biggest hits sides for Cadence".

== Track listing ==
=== Side one ===
1. "The Bilbao Song" (Bertolt Brecht, Johnny Mercer, Kurt Weill) - 2:15
  - rec. 3/9/61; Billboard Hot 100: #37
2. "Lonely Street" (Carl Belew, Kenny Sowder, W.S. Stevenson) - 2:46
  - rec. 8/23/59; Billboard Hot 100: #5, Hot R&B Sides: #20
3. "(In the Summertime) You Don't Want My Love" (Roger Miller) - 2:16
  - rec. 10/17/60; Billboard Hot 100: #64
4. "The Village of St. Bernadette" (Eula Parker) - 3:22
  - rec. 11/19/59; Billboard Hot 100: #7
5. "Canadian Sunset" (Norman Gimbel, Eddie Heywood) - 2:37
  - recorded 7/2/56; Top 100^{[A]}: #8
6. "How Wonderful to Know" (Salvatore d'Esposito, Kermit Goell, Domenico Titomanlio) - 2:21
  - rec. 3/9/61; B-side of "The Bilbao Song"

=== Side two ===
1. "The Hawaiian Wedding Song" (Al Hoffman, Charles E. King, Dick Manning) - 2:29
  - rec. 11/3/58; Billboard Hot 100: #11
2. "Do You Mind?" (Lionel Bart) - 2:17
  - rec. 5/18/60; Billboard Hot 100: #70
3. "Are You Sincere?" (Wayne Walker) - 2:41
  - rec. 12/12/57; Billboard Hot 100: #3
4. "I Like Your Kind of Love" (Melvin Endsley) - 2:30
  - rec. 6/16/57; Top 100: #9
5. "Don't Go to Strangers" (Redd Evans, Arthur Kent, David Mann) - 2:56
  - rec. 10/17/60; B-side of "(In the Summertime) You Don't Want My Love"
6. "Butterfly" (Bernie Lowe, Kal Mann) - 2:21
  - rec. 1/23/57; Top 100: #1 (3 weeks)
- ^{A} Some of the tracks on this compilation were released before Billboard created its Hot 100 chart for tracking song performance.

== Personnel ==
- Andy Williams - vocalist
- Archie Bleyer - arranger, conductor

== Bibliography ==
- Whitburn, Joel (2004), Joel Whitburn Presents Top R&B/Hip-Hop Singles, 1942-2004, Record Research Inc., ISBN 0-89820-160-8
- Whitburn, Joel (2009), Joel Whitburn's Top Pop Singles, 1955-2008, Record Research Inc., ISBN 978-0-89820-180-2
- Whitburn, Joel (2010), Joel Whitburn Presents Top Pop Albums, Seventh Edition, Record Research Inc., ISBN 978-0-89820-183-3
