= Canadian Sunset (album) =

Compilation album by Andy Williams
- Released: 1965
- Recorded: 1956–1961
- Genres: Early pop/rock; traditional pop; vocal pop; standards; soft rock
- Length: 31:45
- Label: Columbia

Andy Williams chronology
Andy Williams' Dear Heart (1965)	Canadian Sunset (1965)	Merry Christmas (1965)

Professional ratings
Review scores
Source	Rating
Allmusic	4/5 stars
The Encyclopedia of Popular Music	3/5 stars

Canadian Sunset is a compilation album by American pop singer Andy Williams that was released in the spring of 1965 by Columbia Records. The cover bears the phrase "formerly titled Andy Williams' Best" underneath the title, suggesting that the same songs can be found here that were on that 1961 release by Cadence Records, but his number one hit "Butterfly" and its top 10 follow-up "I Like Your Kind of Love" that were included on the Cadence album were replaced on this release with the B-sides of two of the other songs here.

This album made its first appearance on the Billboard Top LPs chart in the issue dated July 3, 1965, and remained there for six weeks, peaking at number 112. it also debuted on the Cashbox albums chart in the issue dated July 17, 1965, and remained on the chart for in a total of eight weeks, peaking at number 60.

== Track listing ==
=== Side one ===
1. "The Bilbao Song" (Bertolt Brecht, Johnny Mercer, Kurt Weill) - 2:15
2. "The Hawaiian Wedding Song" (Al Hoffman, Charles E. King, Dick Manning) - 2:29
3. "Lonely Street" (Carl Belew, Kenny Sowder, W.S. Stevenson) - 2:46
4. "Do You Mind?" (Lionel Bart) - 2:17
5. "(In the Summertime) You Don't Want My Love" (Roger Miller) - 2:16
6. "Are You Sincere?" (Wayne Walker) - 2:41

=== Side two ===
1. "The Village of St. Bernadette" (Eula Parker) - 3:22
2. "Canadian Sunset" (Norman Gimbel, Eddie Heywood) - 2:37
3. "Don't Go to Strangers" (Redd Evans, Arthur Kent, David Mann) - 2:56
4. "How Wonderful to Know" (Salvatore d'Esposito, Kermit Goell, Domenico Titomanlio) - 2:21
5. "Summer Love" (Kay Thompson) - 2:52
6. "Dreamsville" (Ray Evans, Jay Livingston, Henry Mancini) - 2:59

== Recording dates ==
Cadence Records founder Archie Bleyer provided Billboard magazine with the following:

- July 2, 1956 - "Canadian Sunset"
- December 12, 1957 - "Are You Sincere"
- November 3, 1958 - "Hawaiian Wedding Song"
- August 23, 1959 - "Lonely Street", "Summer Love"
- November 19, 1959 - "The Village of St. Bernadette"
- May 18, 1960 - "Do You Mind?", "Dreamsville"
- October 17, 1960 - "(In the Summertime) You Don't Want My Love", "Don't Go to Strangers"
- March 9, 1961 - "The Bilbao Song", "How Wonderful to Know"

== Personnel ==
- Andy Williams – vocalist
- Archie Bleyer – arranger, conductor

== Bibliography ==
- Whitburn, Joel (2010), Joel Whitburn Presents Top Pop Albums, Seventh Edition, Record Research Inc., ISBN 0-89820-183-7
