= Andy Williams (album) =

Compilation album by Andy Williams
- Released: 1958
- Recorded: March 15, 1956; July 2, 1956; August 30, 1956; January 23, 1957; April 5, 1957; August 6, 1957
- Genre: Traditional pop; standards
- Length: 29:03
- Label: Cadence Records

Andy Williams chronology
Andy Williams Sings Steve Allen (1956)	Andy Williams (1958)	Andy Williams Sings Rodgers and Hammerstein (1958)

Alternate cover
- Reissue cover

Professional ratings
Review scores
Source	Rating
Allmusic	4/5 stars
Billboard	4/5 stars
The Encyclopedia of Popular Music	2/5 stars

Andy Williams is a compilation album by American pop singer Andy Williams that was released early in 1958 by Cadence Records. This first album to compile the singer's material features his first six songs to make the Billboard Hot 100 along with their corresponding B-sides.

In The Music Lover's Guide to Record Collecting, author Dave Thompson writes, "Of additional interest among Cadence LPs of this period was [company founder Archie] Bleyer's insistence on adding droll commentaries" to the cover design. For example, the cover for the album Kenneth Patchen Reads His Poetry quotes Bleyer as saying, "' Puts muscles in your ears.'" Thompson, however, adds that "the most bizarre phrase is surely that which attends Andy Williams' Andy Williams album: 'He's All Male and Catnip to Quail,' Says Archie". The cover photo alongside it shows Williams standing next to a quail and a squatting figure in a lion costume with a man in the far background seated on a stool with his back to the camera. A much simpler cover design featuring the artist's name and photo with a list of the album's contents was eventually released.

The album was issued on compact disc for the first time as one of two albums on one CD by Collectables Records on September 12, 2000, the other album being Williams's other Cadence release from early 1958, Andy Williams Sings Rodgers and Hammerstein. Collectables included this CD in a box set entitled Classic Album Collection, Vol. 1, which contains 17 of his studio albums and three compilations and was released on June 26, 2001. It was also released as one of two albums on one CD by Ace Records on January 8, 2008, paired this time with his first Cadence album, Andy Williams Sings Steve Allen. Andy Williams was included in a box set entitled Eight Classic Albums Box Set, which contains 7 of his studio albums, 1 compilation, and was released on November 9, 2012.

== Critical reception ==
William Ruhlmann of Allmusic explained that this album "illustrated the challenge of breaking a new artist in the wake of the rock & roll revolution fostered by Elvis Presley, who debuted on the charts the month before Williams did. Time would prove that Williams was at his best in an easy listening ballad mode, a natural successor to Bing Crosby and Perry Como, but in 1956 and 1957 that was a hard sell for a newcomer, and Cadence Records head Archie Bleyer gave Williams a variety of material." Ruhlmann also warned, "Anyone accustomed to the later Andy Williams of "Moon River" may find this album somewhat schizophrenic, but it is an accurate portrait of the successful early days of the singer's career."

== Track listing ==
=== Side one ===
1. "Canadian Sunset" (Norman Gimbel, Eddie Heywood) – 2:37
  - recorded 7/2/56; Top 100^{[A]}: #8
2. "I Like Your Kind of Love" (Melvin Endsley) – 2:30
  - rec. 4/5/57; Top 100: #9
3. "Walk Hand in Hand" (Johnny Cowell) – 2:51
  - rec. 3/15/56; Top 100: #54
4. "Lips of Wine" (Sy Soloway, Shirley Wolfe) – 1:46
  - rec. 8/6/57; Top 100: #39
5. "Not Anymore" (Bob Terry) – 1:59
  - rec. 3/15/56; B-side of "Walk Hand in Hand"
6. "It Doesn't Take Very Long" (Sherman Feller, Kathleen Goodrich) – 2:51
  - rec. 1/23/57; B-side of "Butterfly"

=== Side two ===
1. "Baby Doll" (Bernie Hanighen, Kenyon Hopkins) – 2:04
  - rec. 8/30/56; Top 100: #33
2. "Butterfly" (Bernie Lowe, Kal Mann) – 2:21
  - rec. 1/23/57; Top 100: #1 (3 weeks)
3. "High upon a Mountain" (Jill Jackson, Seymour Miller) – 2:48
  - rec. 7/2/56; B-side of "Canadian Sunset"
4. "Stop Teasin' Me" (Y. Des Louvettes (a.k.a. Kay Thompson)) – 2:30
  - rec. 4/5/57; B-side of "I Like Your Kind of Love"
5. "Since I've Found My Baby" (Jesse Stone) – 2:25
  - rec. 8/30/56; B-side of "Baby Doll"
6. "Straight from My Heart" (Kay Thompson) – 2:27
  - rec. 8/6/57; B-side of "Lips of Wine"
- ^{A} All of the tracks on this compilation were released before Billboard created its Hot 100 chart for tracking song performance.

== Personnel ==
- Andy Williams – vocalist
- Archie Bleyer – arranger, conductor

== Bibliography ==
- Thompson, Dave (2002), The Music Lover's Guide to Record Collecting, Hal Leonard Corporation, ISBN 978-0-87930-713-4
- Whitburn, Joel (2009), Joel Whitburn's Top Pop Singles, 1955–2008, Record Research Inc., ISBN 0-89820-180-2
