= To You Sweetheart, Aloha =

Studio album by Andy Williams
- Released: 1959
- Recorded: November 3, 1958; November 7, 1958; April 29, 1959; April 30, 1959; May 4, 1959
- Genre: traditional pop; standards
- Length: 27:59
- Label: Cadence

Andy Williams chronology
Two Time Winners (1959)	To You Sweetheart, Aloha (1959)	Lonely Street (1959)

To You Sweetheart, Aloha is the fourth studio album by American pop singer Andy Williams and was released late in the summer of 1959 by Cadence Records. This, his fourth LP for the label, has a Hawaiian theme that coincides with the admission of the 50th of the United States.

One of the songs on this album, "Hawaiian Wedding Song", was originally recorded and released as a single in 1958 and stayed on the pop chart for 20 weeks, peaking at number 11. and number six on the Cashbox Single charts during its 21-weeks stay. It was included on his last album, Two Time Winners, as were two other songs from this album, "Blue Hawaii" and "Sweet Leilani". Both of those songs, however, were rerecorded for this album while the hit single was not.

The album was reissued with the title The Hawaiian Wedding Song in 1965 by Columbia Records and entered the Top LP's chart in Billboard magazine's May 22, 1965, and reached number 61 during its 18 weeks there.

To You Sweetheart, Aloha was released on compact disc as one of two albums on one CD by Collectables Records on September 12, 2000, along with William's 1962 Cadence compilation album, Million Seller Songs. Collectables included this CD in a box set entitled Classic Album Collection, Vol. 1, which contains 17 of his studio albums and three compilations and was released on June 26, 2001. This album was also released on compact disc with four bonus tracks after being digitally remastered by Varèse Sarabande in 2001. Three of those four ("Blue Hawaii", "Sweet Leilani", and "Love Letters in the Sand") were recorded for the Two Time Winners album, and the fourth ("House of Bamboo") was the B-side of "Hawaiian Wedding Song". To You Sweethheart, Aloha was included in a box set entitled Eight Classic Albums Box Set, which contains 7 of his studio albums, 1 compilation, and was released on November 9, 2012.

== Reception ==
Professional ratings
Review scores
Source	Rating
AllMusic	3/5 stars
Billboard	4/5 stars
The Encyclopedia of Popular Music	2/5 stars
Record Mirror	4/5 stars

AllMusic's William Ruhlmann pointed out that Cadence Records head and orchestra conductor Archie Bleyer "eschewed the usual practice of employing traditional Hawaiian instruments and importing the islands' musicians, settling instead for Hawaiian-styled arrangements played by a standard orchestra." Ruhlmann emphasized, however, that "what mattered was Williams's typically warm vocal interpretations, which made the album a romantic touchstone."

Billboard gave the album a favorable review. "Here's a tasteful, restful package of familiar Hawaiian themes, sung with relaxed showmanship and rich vocal quality by Williams."

Cashbox stated "Andy Williams wraps his expressive baritone voice around a dozen Island evergreens and comes up with one of the best of the recent albums paying tribute to our 50th state".

Variety noted "Williams captures that romantic atmosphere of the island songs with no stretch of strain."

Record Mirror gave the album a positive reviews, saying "the similarity of style doesn't poll one little bit. "Beyond The Reef" is a lovely song; "Sweet Leilani" is outstandingly sung"

== Track listing ==
=== Side one ===
1. "To You Sweetheart, Aloha" (Harry Owens) - 2:50
2. "Blue Hawaii" (Ralph Rainger, Leo Robin) - 1:59
3. "I'll Weave a Lei of Stars for You" (Robert Alexander Anderson, Harry Owens) - 2:18
4. "Sweet Leilani" (Harry Owens) - 2:34
5. "Moon of Manakoora" (Frank Loesser, Alfred Newman) - 2:48
6. "The Hawaiian Wedding Song" (Al Hoffman, Charles E. King, Dick Manning) - 2:29

=== Side two ===
1. "Song of the Islands" (Charles E. King) - 2:21
2. "A Song of Old Hawaii" (Gordon Beecher, Johnny Noble) - 2:32
3. "Love Song of Kalua" (Ken Darby) - 2:23
4. "Beyond the Reef" (Jack Pitman) - 3:05
5. "Ka-Lu-A" (Anne Caldwell, Jerome Kern) - 2:34
6. "Aloha ‘Oe (Farewell to Thee)" (Liliuokalani) - 2:25

=== CD bonus tracks ===
1. "Blue Hawaii" (Ralph Rainger, Leo Robin) - 2:03
2. "Sweet Leilani" (Harry Owens) - 2:22
3. "Love Letters in the Sand" (J. Fred Coots, Charles Kenny, Nick Kenny) - 2:32
4. "House of Bamboo" (William Crompton, Norman Murrells) - 2:06

== Grammy nomination ==
The single "Hawaiian Wedding Song" brought the first of six Grammy nominations that Williams received over the course of his career, this time in the category of Best Vocal Performance, Male.

== Personnel ==
=== Original album ===
- Andy Williams – vocalist
- Archie Bleyer – orchestra conductor
- Carlyle Hall – arranger

=== Varèse Sarabande reissue ===
From the liner notes for the 2001 CD:

- Cary Mansfield – producer
- Marty Wekser – producer; mastering
- Evren Goknar – mastering
- Joseph Lanza – liner notes
- Bill Pitzonka – art direction & design
- Greg Yantek – additional photo courtesy

== Bibliography ==
- O'Neil, Thomas (1999), The Grammys, Perigree Books, ISBN 0-399-52477-0
- Whitburn, Joel (1986), Joel Whitburn's Pop Memories, 1890-1954, Record Research Inc., ISBN 0-89820-083-0
- Whitburn, Joel (1994), Joel Whitburn's Pop Hits, 1940-1954, Record Research Inc., ISBN 0-89820-106-3
- Whitburn, Joel (2009), Joel Whitburn's Top Pop Singles, 1955-2008, Record Research Inc., ISBN 0-89820-180-2
- Whitburn, Joel (2010), Joel Whitburn Presents Top Pop Albums, Seventh Edition, Record Research Inc., ISBN 0-89820-183-7
- Downey, Pat (1994), Cash box pop singles charts, 1950-1993, Libraries Unlimited, ISBN 1-56308-316-7
