= Classic Album Collection =

(The) Classic Album(s) Collection may refer to:

- The Classic Albums Collection (Electric Light Orchestra album)
- The Classic Albums Collection 1974-1983 2013 by Kansas (band)
- Classic Album Collection, Vol. 1, Million Seller Songs
- Classic Album Collection, Vol. 2, Get Together with Andy Williams
