= Lonely Street (Andy Williams album) =

Studio album by Andy Williams
- Released: 1959
- Recorded: August 23, 1959; October 15, 1959; October 19, 1959; October 30, 1959
- Genre: traditional pop; vocal pop; standards
- Length: 31:43
- Label: Cadence

Andy Williams chronology
To You Sweetheart, Aloha (1959)	Lonely Street (1959)	The Village of St. Bernadette (1960)

Singles from Lonely Street
- 1. "Lonely Street" Released: September 1959

Lonely Street is the fifth studio album by American pop singer Andy Williams, released in late 1959 through Cadence Records. This, his fifth LP of new material for the label, is described by William Ruhlmann on AllMusic.com as "an album full of songs of lost love and loneliness that found Williams using more of the Mel Tormé-like foggy lower register of his voice." The liner notes on the back of the album jacket read, "The selections in Lonely Street, Andy confides, are those for which he feels a special affection. Every vocalist has a few personal favorites... and it is quite clear to the listener that this collection presents songs which Andy Williams believes, feels -- and loves."

== Title track ==
Cadence Records founder Archie Bleyer describes the album's title track as a "song from Nashville, which I first heard at the Everly Brothers' home on one of my trips to that city." He later conducted Williams's recording of "Lonely Street" on August 23, 1959, and the song was released as a single with another song recorded at that session, "Summer Love", as its B-side. The A-side entered the Hot 100 in Billboard magazine in the issue dated September 7 of that year and stayed on the chart for 16 weeks, peaking at number five. In the October 26 issue it debuted on the magazine's list of 30 Hot R&B Sides, where it lasted for four weeks and reached number 20.

== The subsequent album ==
Once Williams had a hit with "Lonely Street", Ruhlmann suggests that, "in forming an album to exploit its success, he looked to the thematic ballad LPs of Frank Sinatra, such as Frank Sinatra Sings for Only the Lonely and In the Wee Small Hours." The liner notes for the original release provide a bit more insight as to how the album came about. "Conceived during a New Orleans engagement late in 1959, the set was molded with the help of Andy's pianist, Dave Grusin, and his guitarist John Abate." Ruhlmann concludes that Williams "didn't have the truly doom-laden style of Sinatra, but he held his own on material not really suited to his usual persona." Lonely Street reached the Top LP's chart in Billboard magazine (a first for Williams) as of the issue dated January 25, 1960, and remained there for four weeks, peaking at number 38 on a list that had 40 positions at the time. it also debuted on the Cashbox albums chart in the issue dated January 2, 1960, and remained on the chart for 11 weeks, peaking at number 36.

The album was released on compact disc in 2000 with five bonus tracks after being digitally remastered by Varèse Sarabande. The original LP was also released as one of two albums on one CD by Collectables Records on September 12, 2000, with the other album being Williams's Cadence release from early 1960, The Village of St. Bernadette. Collectables included this CD in a box set entitled Classic Album Collection, Vol. 1 that contains 17 of his studio albums and three compilations and was released on June 26, 2001. Lonely Street was included in a box set entitled Eight Classic Albums Box Set, which contains 7 of his studio albums, 1 compilation, and was released on November 9, 2012.

== Reception ==
Professional ratings
Review scores
Source	Rating
AllMusic	4.5/5 stars
The Encyclopedia of Popular Music	3/5 stars
Disc	5/5 stars

In his review of the album for AllMusic, Cub Koda proclaimed, "Not enough o's in smooth to describe this one. Williams is nothing but spot on in this collection."

Billboard identified the album as a "Spotlight Winner of the Week" in its review from December 1959, stating that Williams "should have a winning LP" as it "contains some of the numbers formerly released on singles and a flock of lushly styled ballads."

Cashbox felt "a bitter-sweet love ballads that show off his lyric perceptiveness and mature delivery to an exceptional degree".

Ken Graham of Disc notes "The songs are beautiful, the singing superb, the music tasteful and pleasing, giving it five-star ratings." It received four and a half star out of five rating from AllMusic. while getting a lower three-star rating from The Encyclopedia of Popular Music.

== Track listing ==
=== Side one ===
1. "You Don't Know What Love Is" (Don Raye, Gene De Paul) – 3:39
2. "In the Wee Small Hours of the Morning" (Bob Hilliard, David Mann) – 2:53
3. "When Your Lover Has Gone" (Einar Aaron Swan) – 2:42
4. "I'm So Lonesome I Could Cry" (Hank Williams) – 2:41
5. "Gone with the Wind" (Allie Wrubel, Herb Magidson) – 2:06
6. "Summer Love" (Kay Thompson) – 2:52

=== Side two ===
1. "Say It Isn't So" (Irving Berlin) – 3:29
2. "Unchained Melody" (Hy Zaret, Alex North) – 3:16
3. "Autumn Leaves" (Joseph Kosma, Johnny Mercer, Jacques Prévert) – 2:44
4. "Willow Weep for Me" (Ann Ronell) – 2:54
5. "I'm So Alone" (Berdie Abrams, Hank Levine) – 2:21
6. "Lonely Street" (Carl Belew, Kenny Sowder, W.S. Stevenson) – 2:46

=== Varèse Sarabande CD bonus tracks ===
1. "Don't Go to Strangers" (Redd Evans, Arthur Kent, David Mann) – 2:56
  - B-side of "(In the Summertime) You Don't Want My Love" (1960)
2. "Dreamsville" (Ray Evans, Jay Livingston, Henry Mancini) – 2:59
  - B-side of "Do You Mind?" (1960)
3. "Twilight Time" (Artie Dunn; Al Nevins; Morton Nevins; Buck Ram) – 2:38
  - first released on the 1959 album Two Time Winners
4. "It's All in the Game" (Charles Gates Dawes, Carl Sigman) – 2:55
  - first released on the 1959 album Two Time Winners
5. "Lonely Street (single version)" (Carl Belew, Kenny Sowder, W.S. Stevenson) – 2:43

== Charts ==
Chart (1960)	Peak position
US Billboard Best Selling LPs (Billboard)	38
US Cashbox	36

== Personnel ==
=== Original album ===
- Andy Williams – vocalist
- Carlyle Hall – arranger (except where noted)
- Archie Bleyer – orchestra conductor, arranger ("Lonely Street", "Summer Love")

=== Varèse Sarabande reissue ===
- Cary Mansfield – producer
- Marty Wekser – producer; mastering supervision and tape research
- Greg Yantek – producer; photo courtesy
- Jim Phillips – digital remastering
- Steve Massie – construction of track 17 using mono and stereo elements
- Joseph Lanza – liner notes
- Bill Pitzonka – art direction and design

== Bibliography ==
- Whitburn, Joel (1986), Joel Whitburn's Pop Memories, 1890–1954, Record Research Inc., ISBN 0-89820-083-0
- Whitburn, Joel (2004), Joel Whitburn Presents Top R&B/Hip-Hop Singles, 1942–2004, Record Research Inc., ISBN 0-89820-160-8
- Whitburn, Joel (2009), Joel Whitburn's Top Pop Singles, 1955–2008, Record Research Inc., ISBN 978-0-89820-180-2
- Whitburn, Joel (2010), Joel Whitburn Presents Top Pop Albums, Seventh Edition, Record Research Inc., ISBN 978-0-89820-183-3
- Hoffmann, Frank W (1988), The Cash box album charts, 1955-1974, Scarecrow Press, ISBN 0-810-82005-6
- Larkin, Colin (2007), The Encyclopedia of Popular Music, Omnibus Press, ISBN 9-7818-4609-8567
