= Promise Me, Love =

Single by Andy Williams
- B-side: "Your Hand, Your Heart, Your Love"
- Released: September 1958
- Genre: Vocal
- Length: 2:22
- Label: Cadence Records 1351
- Songwriter(s): Kay Thompson

Andy Williams singles chronology
| "Are You Sincere?" (1958) | "Promise Me, Love" (1958) | "The Hawaiian Wedding Song" (1958) |

"Promise Me, Love" is a song written by Kay Thompson and performed by Andy Williams. The song reached #17 on the Billboard chart in 1958. Archie Bleyer's Orchestra played on the song.
