= Andy Williams Sings Steve Allen =

Studio album by Andy Williams
- Released: 1956
- Recorded: September 21, 1956; October 3, 1956; October 4, 1956
- Genres: Traditional pop; vocal pop
- Length: 29:03
- Label: Cadence Records

Andy Williams chronology
Andy Williams Sings Steve Allen (1956)	Andy Williams (1958)

Alternate cover
- 1960 reissue

Andy Williams Sings Steve Allen is the first studio album by American pop singer Andy Williams that was released late in 1956 by Cadence Records. This was his first LP and features songs written or co-written by then-Tonight Show host Steve Allen. Williams, at the time, was a regular weekly contributor to Allen's groundbreaking late night television series. The review of the album in the December 22 issue of The Billboard that year reads, "Cover shows only a photo of the singer with no copy and it might have been a better bet to identify the personality." The cover of the 1960 reissue of the album attempts to rectify this situation with the title presented in two lines of large capital letters that sandwich a headshot of Williams this time instead of the seated pose of the original.

The album was released on compact disc for the first time as one of two albums on one CD by Collectables Records on September 12, 2000, the other album being Williams's Cadence release from the spring of 1959, Two Time Winners. Collectables included this CD in a box set entitled Classic Album Collection, Vol. 1, which contains 17 of his studio albums and three compilations and was released on June 26, 2001. It was also released as one of two albums on one CD by Ace Records on January 8, 2008, paired this time with a 1958 Cadence compilation entitled Andy Williams. Andy Williams Sings Steve Allen was included in a box set entitled Eight Classic Albums Box Set, which contains 7 of his studio albums, 1 compilation, and was released on November 9, 2012.

== Critical reception ==
Professional ratings
Review scores
Source	Rating
Allmusic	3/5 stars
Billboard	Recommended
The Encyclopedia of Popular Music	2/5 stars

Allmusic's William Ruhlmann had praise for the album's contributors: "Allen wrote in a sophisticated pop-jazz style, and conductor Alvy West gave the songs appropriately smoky, late-night settings heavy on tinkling pianos and bluesy horn parts, with some restrained strings." Of the singer, he wrote, "This was yet another opportunity for Williams to show off his diversity, and though he couldn't ever be called a jazz singer, he sounded typically comfortable putting across the songs' slyly romantic lyrics in the melodies' minor keys. The result was a fine mood album and a good addition to his quickly growing album catalog."

The Billboard review from 1956 focused on his status as an up-and-coming talent. "Williams, recently named most promising new male singer in The Billboard disk jockey poll, proceeds to show why in this new album. The dozen tunes…have distinct charm and class. Mostly ballads, each one seems to show singer at his best. Lad has the poise, polish and style to become a top pop singer. Album can be another step up the ladder."

== Track listing ==
All songs written by Steve Allen except as noted:

=== Side one ===
1. "Tonight" - 2:50
2. "Meet Me Where They Play the Blues" (Allen, Sammy Gallop) - 2:18
3. "Stay Just a Little While" (Allen, Eula Parker) - 2:43
4. "Playing the Field" - 2:28
5. "Impossible" - 2:51
6. "Young Love" - 2:38

=== Side two ===
1. "Picnic" (Allen, George Duning) - 2:33
2. "An Old Piano Plays the Blues" (Allen, Don George) - 2:46
3. "Spring in Maine" (Allen, Carolyn Leigh) - 2:50
4. "All the Way Home" (Allen, Buddy Kaye) - 2:40
5. "Lonely Love" (Allen, Fred Sadoff) - 3:07
6. "Forbidden Love" - 2:05

== Covers ==
Some of the songs on this album had previously been covered by other artists. Jack Teagarden had already recorded "Meet Me Where They Play the Blues". And The McGuire Sisters included "Picnic" on their 1956 album Chris, Phyllis, Dottie.

== Personnel ==
- Andy Williams - vocalist
- Alvy West - arranger, conductor
- Kay Thompson - liner notes
