= Danny Boy and Other Songs I Love to Sing =

Studio album by Andy Williams
- Released: 1962
- Recorded: September 27, 1961; November 3, 1961; November 6, 1961; November 8, 1961; November 10, 1961
- Genres: Traditional pop; standards
- Length: 38:13
- Label: Columbia
- Producer: Robert Mersey

Andy Williams chronology
Andy Williams' Best (1961)	Danny Boy and Other Songs I Love to Sing (1962)	Moon River and Other Great Movie Themes (1962)

Singles from Danny Boys and Other Songs I Love to Sing
- 1. "Danny Boy" Released: October 1961

Danny Boy and Other Songs I Love to Sing is the eighth studio album by American pop singer Andy Williams. It was released in early 1962 by Columbia Records. This was his first project after leaving Cadence Records, where his albums each had a specific theme. Additionally, it was his first in a series of LPs that covered songs established on stage, screen, and other hits from the pop chart and the Great American Songbook. This trend would not be interrupted until his 1966 album, The Shadow of Your Smile, hinted at a shift toward contemporary material with its inclusion of songs first recorded by the Beatles.

The album debuted on Billboard magazine's Top LP's chart in the issue dated March 3, 1962. It stayed around for 36 weeks, peaking at number 19. It debuted on the Cashbox albums chart in the issue dated April 7, 1962, and remained on the chart for a total of six weeks, peaking at number 42.

The single, "Danny Boy", debuted on the Billboard Hot 100 chart in the issue dated October 30, 1961, and reached number 64 during its six-week stay. On Billboard's Easy Listening chart, it peaked at number 15. and number 78 on the Cashbox singles chart during its six weeks there.

The album was released on compact disc by Sony Music Distribution on May 15, 2001, as tracks 1 through 12 on a pairing of two albums on one CD with tracks 13 through 24 consisting of Williams's Columbia album from April 1962, Moon River and Other Great Movie Themes. It was released as one of two albums on one CD by Collectables Records on February 5, 2002, along with Williams's Columbia album from January 1964, The Wonderful World of Andy Williams. Collectibles included the CD in a 2002 box set entitled Classic Album Collection, Vol. 2, which contained 15 of his studio albums and two compilations.

== Reception ==
Professional ratings
Review scores
Source	Rating
AllMusic	3/5 stars
The Encyclopedia of Popular Music	3/5 stars
Disc	4/5 stars

AllMusic's William Ruhlmann wrote that this was an "entertaining collection" and "features some excellent performances of well-known tunes."

Billboard said it features "a group of old songs, each with a gentle, romantic flavor"

In its review of the album from January 1962, Cashbox believed the album "should be a welcome asset to all the William's Admirers."

Variety noted Williams' "warm baritone gives plenty of meaning to such as 'Danny Boy', 'The Heather On The Hill', 'Tammy', 'Secret Love', and 'Misty'.'

Nigel Hunter of Disc notes "The arranger-MD does a first-class job throughout-good enough to warrant a credit somewhere which he doesn't get, giving the album a four-star rating."

Both The Encyclopedia of Popular Music and AllMusic gave the album a three-star ratings, the latter's rating meaning that they believed that album was "Good by the artist's usual standrands, ane therefore recommended.

== Track listing ==
=== Side one ===
1. "Danny Boy" (Frederic Weatherly) – 2:56
2. "Tammy" from Tammy and the Bachelor (Ray Evans, Jay Livingston) – 3:08
3. "The Twelfth of Never" (Jerry Livingston, Paul Francis Webster) – 2:53
4. "I'm Old Fashioned" from You Were Never Lovelier (Jerome Kern, Johnny Mercer) – 3:00
5. "Come to Me, Bend to Me" from Brigadoon (Alan Jay Lerner, Frederick Loewe) – 3:25
6. "Secret Love" from Calamity Jane (Sammy Fain, Paul Francis Webster) – 3:16

=== Side two ===
1. "The Heather on the Hill" from Brigadoon (Lerner, Loewe) – 3:02
2. "Can I Forget You" from High, Wide, and Handsome (Oscar Hammerstein II, Kern) – 3:44
3. "It Could Happen to You" from And the Angels Sing (Johnny Burke, Jimmy Van Heusen) – 3:01
4. "I Want to Be Wanted" (Kim Gannon, Giuseppe Spotti, Alberto Testa) – 3:20
5. "Summertime" from Porgy and Bess (George Gershwin, Ira Gershwin, DuBose Heyward) – 3:07
6. "Misty" (Erroll Garner, Burke) – 3:24

== Recording dates ==
From the liner notes for the 2002 CD:

- September 27, 1961 - "Danny Boy"
- November 3, 1961 - "Tammy", "Misty"
- November 6, 1961 - "The Heather on the Hill'", "I Want to Be Wanted"
- November 8, 1961 - "I'm Old Fashioned", "Secret Love", "Summertime"
- November 10, 1961 - "The Twelfth of Never", "Come to Me, Bend to Me", "Can I Forget You", "It Could Happen to You"

== Charts ==
Chart (1962)	Peak position
US Top LPs (Billboard)	19
US Cashbox	42

=== Singles ===
Year	Title	U.S. Hot 100	U.S. AC	U.S. Cashbox
1961	"Danny Boy"	64	15	78

== Grammy nomination ==
The single "Danny Boy" brought another of the six Grammy nominations that Williams received over the course of his career, this time in the category for Best Solo Vocal Performance, Male.

== Personnel ==
From the liner notes for the original album:

- Andy Williams – vocals
- Robert Mersey – arranger, conductor, producer
- Bob Cato – photographer

== Bibliography ==
- O'Neil, Thomas (1999), The Grammys, Perigree Books, ISBN 0-399-52477-0
- Whitburn, Joel (1993), Joel Whitburn's Top Adult Contemporary, 1961-1993, Record Research Inc., ISBN 0-89820-099-7
- Whitburn, Joel (1999), Joel Whitburn's Top Pop Singles, 1955-1999, Record Research Inc., ISBN 0-89820-140-3
- Whitburn, Joel (2010), Joel Whitburn Presents Top Pop Albums, Seventh Edition, Record Research Inc., ISBN 978-0-89820-183-3
- Hoffmann, Frank W (1988), The Cash box album charts, 1955-1974, Scarecrow Press, ISBN 0-810-82005-6
- Larkin, Colin (2007), The Encyclopedia of Popular Music, Omnibus Press, ISBN 9-7818-4609-8567
- Downey, Pat (1994), Cash box pop singles charts, 1950-1993, Libraries Unlimited, ISBN 1-56308-316-7
