= Two Time Winners =

Studio album by Andy Williams
- Released: 1959
- Recorded: November 3, 1958; November 7, 1958; January 12, 1959; February 10, 1959; February 13, 1959
- Genre: traditional pop; standards
- Length: 27:59
- Label: Cadence

Andy Williams chronology
Andy Williams Sings Rodgers and Hammerstein (1958)	Two Time Winners (1959)	To You Sweetheart, Aloha (1959)

Singles from Two Time Winners
- 1. "Hawaiian Wedding Song" Released: December 9, 1958; 2. "Twilight Time" Released: November 14, 1962

Two Time Winners is the third studio album by American pop singer Andy Williams and was released in the spring of 1959 by Cadence Records. This, his third LP for the label, is composed of songs that had been successful on two previous occasions or in two different ways.

The first single from the album, "Hawaiian Wedding Song", entered the Billboard Hot 100 in the issue dated December 29, 1958, and stayed on the chart for 20 weeks, peaking at number 11. Four months later, in the April 20 issue, the song spent its 1-week on the Hot R&B Sides chart at number 27. The song peaked at number six on the Cashbox Singles charts during its 21-weeks stay. "Twilight Time" was issued as a single 3 years later to coincide with the release of the 1962 Cadence compilation Million Seller Songs and entered the Hot 100 at the end of the year in the December 8 issue for a 3-week run that took the song to number 86. and number 96 on the Cashbox Singles charts during its six-weeks stay.

The album was released on compact disc as one of two albums on one CD by Collectables Records on September 12, 2000, along with Williams's debut studio album Andy Williams Sings Steve Allen. Collectables included this CD in a box set entitled Classic Album Collection, Vol. 1, which contains 17 of his studio albums and 3 compilations and was released on June 26, 2001. Two Time Winner was included in a box set entitled Eight Classic Albums Box Set, which contains 7 of his studio albums, 1 compilation, and was released on November 9, 2012.

== Reception ==
Professional ratings
Review scores
Source	Rating
AllMusic	3/5 stars
The Encyclopedia of Popular Music	3/5 stars
Disc	3/5 stars

William Ruhlmann of AllMusic noted that "Williams continued to prove himself an effective and versatile singer capable of bringing off such lightly rocking or exotic revivals."

Billboard identified the album as a "Spotlight Winner of the Week" in its review from May 1959, stating that it "dress[es] old standards in new arrangements to achieve new popularity-as Williams did with the 'Hawaiian Wedding Song'- which is included here".

Cashbox in its Popular Pick of The Week Reviews, stated that Williams "indulges the tunes with the modern beat treatment, attesting to their indestructibility."

Variety notes Williams is "a slick song-seller and know how to get the most out of such as 'So Rare' , 'Love Letters in the Sand' , 'It's All in The Game', and 'Near You','

Music Vendor thought the "Album will appeal to an adult market as well as teenagers", and notes "although the beat and feel has been up-dated, Andy's superb styling will get through to many older folk."

Ken Graham of Disc notes The "Accompaniments is finely supplied by the Archie Bleyer orchestra which has been associated with all of Andy's hits in the past."

The critics of The Encyclopedia of Popular Music, Disc, and AllMusic each gave the album a three-star ratings.

== Track listing ==
=== Side one ===
1. "Sail Along, Silvery Moon" (Harry Tobias, Percy Wenrich) - 1:56
2. "Twilight Time" (Artie Dunn; Al Nevins; Morton Nevins; Buck Ram) - 2:38
3. "So Rare" (Jerry Herst, Jack Sharpe) - 2:01
4. "Hawaiian Wedding Song" (Al Hoffman, Charles E. King, Dick Manning) - 2:29
5. "Blueberry Hill" (Al Lewis, Vincent Rose, Larry Stock) - 2:01
6. "Sweet Leilani" (Harry Owens) - 2:19

=== Side two ===
1. "Love Letters in the Sand" (J. Fred Coots, Charles Kenny, Nick Kenny) - 2:32
2. "It's All in the Game" (Charles Gates Dawes, Carl Sigman) - 2:55
3. "Blue Hawaii" (Ralph Rainger, Leo Robin) - 2:02
4. "Be Mine Tonight" (Maria Teresa Lara, Sunny Skylar) - 2:21
5. "My Happiness" (Borney Bergantine, Betty Peterson Blasco) - 2:23
6. "Near You" (Francis Craig, Kermit Goell) - 2:29

== Grammy nomination ==
"Hawaiian Wedding Song" brought the first of six Grammy nominations that Williams received over the course of his career, being nominated in the category of Best Vocal Performance, Male.

== Personnel ==
- Andy Williams - vocalist
- Archie Bleyer - orchestra conductor
- Carlyle Hall - arranger

== Bibliography ==
- O'Neil, Thomas (1999), The Grammys, Perigree Books, ISBN 0-399-52477-0
- Whitburn, Joel (1996), Joel Whitburn's Top R & B Singles, 1942-1995, Record Research Incorporated, ISBN 978-0-89820-115-4
- Whitburn, Joel (2009), Joel Whitburn's Top Pop Singles, 1955-2008, Record Research Inc., ISBN 978-0-89820-180-2
- Downey, Pat (1994), Cash box pop singles charts, 1950-1993, Libraries Unlimited, ISBN 1-56308-316-7
- Larkin, Colin (2007), The Encyclopedia of Popular Music, Omnibus Press, ISBN 9-7818-4609-8567
