= The Village of St. Bernadette =

Studio album by Andy Williams
- Released: 1960
- Recorded: November 19, 1959, January 1960
- Genre: Vocal pop; inspirational; traditional pop; gospel; hymns; contemporary gospel
- Length: 37:16
- Label: Cadence

Andy Williams chronology
Lonely Street (1959)	The Village of St. Bernadette (1960)	Under Paris Skies (1960)

Singles from The Village of St. Bernadette
- 1. "The Village of St. Bernadette" Released: December 1959

The Village of St. Bernadette is the sixth studio album by American pop singer Andy Williams and was released in early 1960 by Cadence Records. It was described by Billboard magazine as "a lovely set of pop inspirational, hymns, and religious themes".

It debuted on the Cashbox albums chart in the issue dated April 16, 1960, reaching No. 45 in its only week on the chart,

The title song from the album entered the Billboard Hot 100 in the issue of the magazine dated December 14, 1959, and stayed on the chart for 13 weeks, peaking at number seven.

The album was released on compact disc as one of two albums on one CD by Collectables Records on September 12, 2000, along with Williams's 1959 Cadence album, Lonely Street. Collectables included this CD in a box set entitled Classic Album Collection, Vol. 1, which contains 17 of his studio albums and three compilations and was released on June 26, 2001.

The Village of St. Bernadette was included in a box set entitled Eight Classic Albums Box Set, which contains seven of his studio albums, one compilation, and was released on November 9, 2012.

== Reception ==
Professional ratings
Review scores
Source	Rating
AllMusic	3/5 stars
The Encyclopedia of Popular Music	2/5 stars

William Ruhlmann of AllMusic wrote that "Williams applied his usual warmth. The result was not one of his most popular recordings, but one that helped further expand his appeal."

Billboard identified the album as a "Spotlight Winner of the Week" in its review from March 1960, stating that "The renditions are sincere and dedicated throughout."

== Track listing ==
=== Side one ===
1. "The Village of St. Bernadette" (Eula Parker) – 3:22
2. "He's Got the Whole World in His Hands" (Traditional; arranged by Archie Bleyer) – 3:07
3. "Suddenly There's a Valley" (Biff Jones, Charles Meyer) – 2:52
4. "Count Your Blessings" (Irving Berlin) – 3:17
5. "He" (Richard Mullan, Jack Richards) – 2:59
6. "You'll Never Walk Alone" (Oscar Hammerstein II, Richard Rodgers) – 2:27

=== Side two ===
1. "Our Lady of Fatima" (Gladys Gollahon) – 3:23
2. "The Three Bells" (Bert Reisfeld, Jean Villard) – 3:49
3. "Climb Ev'ry Mountain" (Oscar Hammerstein II, Richard Rodgers) – 3:09
4. "Sweet Morning" (Kay Thompson) – 2:45
5. "I Believe" (Ervin Drake, Irvin Graham, Jimmy Shirl, Al Stillman) – 2:43
6. "Look for the Silver Lining" (Buddy DeSylva, Jerome Kern) – 3:29

== Personnel ==
- Andy Williams – vocalist
- Archie Bleyer – arranger
- Dave Grusin – pianist, arranger

== Bibliography ==
- Bronson, Fred (2003), The Billboard Book of Number One Hits, Billboard Books, ISBN 0-8230-7677-6
- Collins, Ace (2003), Stories Behind the Hymns That Inspire America: Songs That Unite Our Nation, Zondervan, ISBN 0-310-24879-5
- Ennis, Philip H. (1992), The Seventh Stream: The Emergence of Rocknroll in American Popular Music, Wesleyan University Press, ISBN 0-8195-6257-2
- Jasen, David A. (2003), Tin Pan Alley: An Encyclopedia of the Golden Age of American Song, Routledge, ISBN 0-415-93877-5
- Kingsbury, Paul, ed. (1998), The Encyclopedia of Country Music, Oxford University Press, Inc., ISBN 978-0-19-517608-7
- Laird, Ross (1996), Moanin' Low: A Discography of Female Popular Vocal Recordings, 1920-1933, Greenwood Press, ISBN 0-313-29241-8
- Lonergan, David F. (2005), Hit Records: 1950-1975, Scarecrow Press Inc., ISBN 0-8108-5129-6
- Marcic, Dorothy (2002), Respect: Women and Popular Music, Texere, ISBN 1-58799-083-0
- Plasketes, George (2010), Play It Again: Cover Songs in Popular Music, Ashgate Publishing, ISBN 0-7546-6809-6
- Simpson, Paul (2004), The Rough Guide to Cult Pop, Rough Guides, ISBN 1-84353-229-8
- Studwell, William Emmett (1994), The Popular Song Reader: A Sampler of Well-Known Twentieth-Century Songs, The Haworth Press, ISBN 1-56024-369-4
- Thompson, Dave (2008), Phil Spector: Wall of Pain, Omnibus Press, ISBN 1-84938-237-9
- Tyler, Don (2008), Music of the Postwar Era, Greenwood Publishing Group, Inc., ISBN 978-0-313-34191-5
- Warner, Jay (2006), America Singing Groups: A History from 1940 to Today, Hal Leonard, ISBN 0-352-33533-5
- Whitburn, Joel (1986), Joel Whitburn's Pop Memories, 1890-1954, Record Research Inc., ISBN 0-89820-083-0
- Whitburn, Joel (1994), Joel Whitburn's Pop Hits, 1940-1954, Record Research Inc., ISBN 0-89820-106-3
- Whitburn, Joel (2009), Joel Whitburn's Top Pop Singles, 1955-2008, Record Research Inc., ISBN 0-89820-180-2
