= Let's Love While We Can =

Studio album by Andy Williams
- Released: 1980
- Genre: Country
- Length: 33:49
- Label: CBS Records
- Producer: Dick Peirce

Andy Williams chronology
Andy (1976)	Let's Love While We Can (1980)	Greatest Love Classics (1984)

Professional ratings
Review scores
Source	Rating
Allmusic	3/5 stars
The Encyclopedia of Popular Music	3/5 stars

Let's Love While We Can is the thirty-seventh studio album by American singer Andy Williams, released in the U.K. in 1980 by CBS Records. For this project Williams eschews covering well-known pop hits and standards and relies mostly on original or lesser-known country songs.

On June 21, 2004, Let's Love While We Can became available as one of two albums on one CD by Sony Music Distribution, along with Williams's 1974 Columbia album, You Lay So Easy on My Mind. Two songs from this album, "Jason" and "I'll Never Love Anyone Anymore", were included as bonus tracks on the 2002 CD release of Williams's previous album, Andy.

== Track listing ==
=== Side one ===
1. "Let's Love While We Can" (Ronny Scaife) - 2:49
2. "Only Everything" (Randy Goodrum) - 3:32
3. "Jason" (Deborah Kay Hupp, Robert E. Morrison) - 3:12
4. "Beside Me" (Randy Goodrum) - 2:24
5. "If You Were a Singer" (Marty Cooper) - 3:29
6. "Railway Hotel" (Mike Batt) - 3:11

=== Side two ===
1. "I Don't Want to Be in Love" (Charlie Black, Rory Michael Bourke) - 3:31
2. "Love Is a Cold Wind" (Charlie Black, Rory Michael Bourke) - 3:53
3. "Regrets" (Barbara Wyrick) - 3:15
4. "If I Reach for You" (Charlie Black, Mike Lawler) - 3:37
5. "It Was Time" (Barry Mann, Cynthia Weil) - 4:13
6. "I'll Never Love Anyone Anymore" (Laurie Andrew, Cedric Chiles) - 2:46

== Song information ==
Barbara Fairchild entered the Country singles chart with "Let's Love While We Can" in the issue of Billboard magazine dated May 10, 1975, and reached number 52 over the course of 10 weeks. "Railway Hotel" first appeared on Mike Batt's 1977 album Schizophonia, and "Love Is a Cold Wind" was recorded by Roy Orbison for his 1979 album Laminar Flow. "Beside Me" by Steve Wariner made its first appearance on the Country singles chart in the August 4, 1979, issue of Billboard and got as high as number 60 during its seven weeks there. James Brown's recording of "Regrets" debuted on the Billboard R&B chart in the issue of the magazine dated January 26, 1980, and began a six-week run that took the song to number 63, and Kenny Rankin entered the Adult Contemporary chart with the song six months later, in the July 19 issue, and peaked at number 33 during his seven weeks there.

== Personnel ==
From the liner notes for the original album:

- Andy Williams - vocals
- Dick Peirce - producer
- Billy Sherrill - engineer
- Bill Justis - arrangements
- Yvonne Hodges - background vocals
- Donna McElroy - background vocals
- Lewis Nunley - background vocals
- Steve Pippin - background vocals
- Wendy Suits - background vocals
- Dennis Wilson - background vocals
- Gil Wright - background vocals
- Mary Ann Kennedy - female vocal solo ("Regrets")
- Slick Lawson - cover photo
- Keats Tyler - back cover photo
- Simon Cantwell - design

=== Musicians ===
- David Briggs - piano
- Jimmy Capps - acoustic & rhythm guitars
- Jerry Carrigan - drums & percussion
- Chuck Cochran - piano
- Pete Drake - steel guitar
- Ray Edenton - acoustic & rhythm guitars
- Shane Keister - keyboards
- The Ron Keller Brass - brass
- Dave Kirby - acoustic & rhythm guitars
- Jerry Kroon - drums & percussion
- The Sheldon Kurland Strings - strings
- Mike Lawler - synthesizer
- Kenny Malone - drums & percussion
- Bob Moore - bass
- Roger Morris - keyboards
- Leon Rhodes - electric guitar
- Hargus "Pig" Robbins - piano
- Billy Sanford - electric guitar
- Jerry Shook - acoustic & rhythm guitars
- Jack Solomon - acoustic & rhythm guitars
- Pete Wade - electric guitar
- Recorded at Jack Clement Recording Studio, Nashville, Tennessee

== Bibliography ==
- Whitburn, Joel (2002), Joel Whitburn's Top Country Singles, 1944-2001, Record Research Inc., ISBN 0-89820-151-9
- Whitburn, Joel (2004), Joel Whitburn Presents Top R&B/Hip-Hop Singles, 1942-2004, Record Research Inc., ISBN 0-89820-160-8
- Whitburn, Joel (2007), Joel Whitburn Presents Billboard Top Adult Songs, 1961-2006, Record Research Inc., ISBN 978-0-89820-169-7
