= Nashville (Andy Williams album) =

Studio album by Andy Williams
- Released: 1991
- Genre: Country
- Length: 36:09
- Label: Curb
- Producer: Jimmy Bowen; Andy Williams

Andy Williams chronology
I Still Believe in Santa Claus (1990)	Nashville (1991)	The Best of Andy Williams (1992)

Professional ratings
Review scores
Source	Rating
Allmusic	2.5/5 stars

Nashville is the forty-first studio album by American pop singer Andy Williams, released by Curb Records in 1991. It's Williams's third album of country music, the first being You Lay So Easy on My Mind in 1974, and was reissued with a different track order under the title Best of Country on September 7, 1999.

== Track listing ==
1. "One Track Memory" (Charlie Black, Steve Bogard, Tommy Rocco) – 3:19
2. "Here and Now" (Mike Reid) – 3:03
3. "If I Had You" (Kerry Chater, Danny "Bear" Mayo) – 3:33
4. "After All This Time" (Rodney Crowell) – 4:23
5. "Ship in a Bottle" (Dave Loggins) – 4:15
6. "Till Then" (Bob Regan, George Teren) – 3:18
7. "Still Under the Weather" (Skip Ewing, L.E. White, Larry Michael White) – 3:02
8. "If I Had Only Known" (Craig Morris, Jana Stanfield) – 3:35
9. "If I Were You" (Randy Goodrum) – 4:25
10. "Last Chance" (Steve Bogard, Rick Giles) – 3:15

== Song information ==
The two songs that Williams covers on the album that had already been chart hits for other artists both went to number one on the country chart in 1989. One of them, "If I Had You" by Alabama, was, in fact, knocked out of the number one spot by the other, Rodney Crowell's "After All This Time", in May of that year. Two other songs here have been covered by other artists. "If I Had Only Known" was also recorded by Reba McEntire in 1991 for her album For My Broken Heart, and "Still Under the Weather" was later recorded by Shania Twain for her self-titled debut album.

== Personnel ==
Adapted from the AllMusic credits.

- Andy Williams - vocals, background vocals
- Larry Byrom - acoustic guitar
- Mark Casstevens - banjo
- Mike Lawler - synthesizer
- Paul Leim - drums
- Michael Rhodes - bass
- Matt Rollings - piano
- Dennis Wilson - background vocals
- Bob Wray - bass
- Curtis Young - background vocals
- Reggie Young - electric guitar

Production

- Milan Bogdan - editing, digital editing
- Jimmy Bowen - producer
- Bob Bullock - mixing assistant
- Mark J. Coddington - engineer
- Tim Kish - assistant engineer
- Glenn Meadows - mastering
- Paula Montondo - assistant engineer, mixing assistant
- Ray Pillow - song selection assistance

== Bibliography ==
- Whitburn, Joel (2002), Joel Whitburn's Top Country Singles, 1944-2001, Record Research Inc., ISBN 0-89820-151-9
