= Million Seller Songs =

Compilation album by Andy Williams
- Released: 1962
- Recorded: 1956–1961
- Genres: traditional pop; vocal pop; standards
- Length: 33:46
- Label: Cadence Records

Andy Williams chronology
Warm and Willing (1962)	Million Seller Songs (1962)	Days of Wine and Roses and Other TV Requests (1963)

Professional ratings
Review scores
Source	Rating
AllMusic	4/5 stars
The Encyclopedia of Popular Music	3/5 stars

Million Seller Songs is a compilation album by American pop singer Andy Williams that was released in the fall of 1962 by Cadence Records. This third album to compile the singer's material features some of the most successful songs Williams had recorded to date (albeit, in most cases, successful for another artist).

The collection made its first appearance on the Billboard Top LPs chart in the issue dated January 12, 1963, and remained there for 43 weeks, peaking at #54. it also debuted on the Cashbox albums chart in the issue dated December 15, of that year, and remained on the chart for 16 weeks, peaking at number 24

The album was issued on compact disc as one of two albums on one CD by Collectables Records on September 12, 2000, along with Williams's 1959 Cadence album, To You Sweetheart, Aloha. Million Seller Songs was included in a box set entitled Classic Album Collection, Vol. 1, which contains 17 of his studio albums and three compilations and was released on June 26, 2001.

== Track listing ==
=== Side one ===
1. "Twilight Time" (Artie Dunn; Al Nevins; Morton Nevins; Buck Ram) - 2:38
2. "Autumn Leaves" (Joseph Kosma, Johnny Mercer, Jacques Prévert) - 2:44
3. "Canadian Sunset" (Norman Gimbel, Eddie Heywood) - 2:37
4. "The Three Bells" (Bert Reisfeld, Jean Villard) - 3:49
5. "It's All in the Game" (Charles Gates Dawes, Carl Sigman) - 2:55
6. "Butterfly" (Bernie Lowe, Kal Mann) - 2:21

=== Side two ===
1. "Suddenly There's a Valley" (Biff Jones, Charles Meyer) - 2:52
2. "Love Letters in the Sand" (J. Fred Coots, Charles Kenny, Nick Kenny) - 2:32
3. "Mam'selle" (Mack Gordon, Edmund Goulding) - 3:33
4. "So Rare" (Jerry Herst, Jack Sharpe) - 2:01
5. "He's Got the Whole World in His Hands" (traditional) - 3:07
6. "Picnic" (Steve Allen, George Duning) - 2:33

== Personnel ==
- Andy Williams - vocalist
- Archie Bleyer - arranger, conductor
- Hugh Cherry - liner notes

== Bibliography ==
- Whitburn, Joel (2010), Joel Whitburn Presents Top Pop Albums, Seventh Edition, Record Research Inc., ISBN 978-0-89820-183-3
