= Warm and Willing =

Studio album by Andy Williams
- Released: 1962
- Recorded: 1962
- Genre: Traditional pop; standards
- Length: 40:24
- Label: Columbia
- Producer: Robert Mersey

Andy Williams chronology
Moon River and Other Great Movie Themes (1962)	Warm and Willing (1962)	Million Seller Songs (1962)

Singles from Warm and Willing
- 1. "Stranger on the Shore" Released: May 1962

Warm and Willing is the tenth studio album by American pop singer Andy Williams, released in 1962 by Columbia Records. AllMusic's William Ruhlmann explained that Williams and producer Robert Mersey "followed the Sinatra concept-album formula of creating a consistent mood, in this case a romantic one, and picking material mostly from the Great American Songbook of compositions written for Broadway musicals in the 1920s and 1930s by the likes of George and Ira Gershwin, then giving them slow, string-filled arrangements over which Williams could croon in his breathy, intimate tenor voice."

The album debuted on Billboard magazine's Top LP's chart in the issue dated October 20, 1962, and remained on the chart for 44 weeks, peaking at number 16. It debuted on the Cash Box albums chart in the issue dated October 20, 1962, and remained on the chart for 57 weeks, peaking at number 19.

The single, "Stranger on the Shore," debuted on the Billboard Hot 100 chart four months prior, reaching number 38 during a seven-week stay. On the magazine's Easy Listening chart, it peaked at number 9. number 10 on the Cashbox singles chart during its six-weeks stay. and number 30 in The U.K during its ten-weeks stay.

The album was released on compact disc by Sony Music Distribution on December 28, 1999, as tracks 1 through 12 on a pairing of two albums on one CD with tracks 13 through 24 consisting of Williams's 1966 Columbia album, The Shadow of Your Smile. It was released as one of two albums on one CD by Collectables Records on February 5, 2002, along with Williams's 1966 Columbia compilation album Andy Williams' Newest Hits. In a 2002 box set entitled Classic Album Collection, Vol. 2, the album was included as part of a collection of 15 of his studio albums and two compilations.

== Reception ==
Professional ratings
Review scores
Source	Rating
AllMusic	3/5 stars
The Encyclopedia of Popular Music	3/5 stars
New Record Mirror	5/5 stars
Disc	4/5 stars

Ruhlmann thought the album "indicated that a singer who had flirted with many styles over the previous half-dozen years had settled down to something very familiar. His treatment of these standards was not definitive, by any means, but it was certainly effective, and Williams benefited from his association with such material."

Billboard was effusive in its praise: "This is one of the best albums Williams has done on his new label." They also wrote, "Helped muchly by the tender orchestral backing of the Bob Mersey crew, Williams turns in strong readings of each song." Cashbox notes "Williams distinctive styling coupled with superb range and pitch is firmly evidenced on 'Embraceable You', 'The Way You Look Tonight' and his while back ... 'Stranger on The Shore'.' Variety wrote that Williams' "vocal stylings are quite pleasing and are especially stuited to this song bag of romantic ballads".

American Record Guide notes Williams "manages to ... without sounding callow or just plain repulsive, and he also chooses both songs and his backing wisely." Jimmy Watson of New Record Mirror described the album as "an outstanding disc". Nigel Hunter of Disc notes "Andy Williams score a high total indeed with these smoothly songs, most of them standards."

== Track listing ==
=== Side one ===
1. "Embraceable You" from Girl Crazy (George Gershwin, Ira Gershwin) – 3:40
2. "How Long Has This Been Going On?" from Rosalie (George Gershwin, Ira Gershwin) – 3:34
3. "The Touch of Your Lips" (Ray Noble) – 3:09
4. "I See Your Face Before Me" from Between the Devil (Howard Dietz, Arthur Schwartz) – 3:34
5. "The Way You Look Tonight" from Swing Time (Dorothy Fields, Jerome Kern) – 3:36
6. "If Ever I Would Leave You" from Camelot (Alan Jay Lerner, Frederick Loewe) – 3:38 (This track was replaced by "Then I'll Be Tired of You" on the U.K. release.)

=== Side two ===
1. "My One and Only Love" (Robert Mellin, Guy Wood) – 3:49
2. "Stranger on the Shore" (Acker Bilk) – 2:50
3. "Warm All Over" from The Most Happy Fella (Frank Loesser) – 3:16
4. "More Than You Know" from the 1929 musical Great Day (Edward Eliscu, Billy Rose, Vincent Youmans) – 3:26
5. "Love Is Here to Stay" from The Goldwyn Follies (George Gershwin, Ira Gershwin) – 2:43
6. "Warm and Willing" from the 1959 film A Private's Affair (Ray Evans, Jay Livingston, Jimmy McHugh) – 2:52

== Charts ==
Chart (1962)	Peak position
US Top LPs (Billboard)	16
US Cashbox	19

=== Singles ===
Year	Title	U.S. Hot 100	U.S. Cashbox	U.S. AC	UK Singles
1962	"Stranger on the Shore"	38	10	9	30

== Personnel ==
From the liner notes for the original album:

- Robert Mersey – arranger, conductor, producer
- Andy Williams – vocals

== Bibliography ==
- Whitburn, Joel (1985), Joel Whitburn's Top Pop Albums, 1955-1985, Record Research Inc., ISBN 0-89820-054-7
- Whitburn, Joel (1993), Joel Whitburn's Top Adult Contemporary, 1961-1993, Record Research Inc., ISBN 0-89820-099-7
- Whitburn, Joel (1999), Joel Whitburn's Top Pop Singles, 1955-1999, Record Research Inc., ISBN 0-89820-140-3
- Hoffmann, Frank W (1988), The Cash box album charts, 1955-1974, Scarecrow Press, ISBN 0-810-82005-6
- Larkin, Colin (2007), The Encyclopedia of Popular Music, Omnibus Press, ISBN 9-7818-4609-8567
- Downey, Pat (1994), Cash box pop singles charts, 1950-1993, Libraries Unlimited, ISBN 1-56308-316-7
