= Lonely Street (Carl Belew song) =

- Original US single

Single by Andy Williams

from the album Lonely Street
- B-side: "Summer Love"
- Released: September 1959
- Recorded: August 23, 1959
- Genre: Easy Listening
- Length: 2:46
- Label: Cadence 1370
- Songwriters: Carl Belew, Kenny Sowder, W.S. Stevenson

Andy Williams singles chronology
"The Hawaiian Wedding Song" (1958)	"Lonely Street" (1959)	"The Village of St. Bernadette" (1959)

"Lonely Street" is a 1956 song written by Carl Belew, Kenny Sowder, and W.S. Stevenson, originally performed by Belew, and later by Dave Rich.

== Andy Williams recording ==
Its most successful rendition was by Andy Williams, whose version reached No. 5 on the Billboard chart and No. 20 on the R&B chart in 1959. The song appeared on his 1959 album, Lonely Street. Archie Bleyer's Orchestra played on the song.

The song was ranked No. 49 on Billboard magazine's Top Hot 100 songs of 1959.

== Other cover versions ==
- Kitty Wells released it as the title song on her Lonely Street album in 1958.
- Patsy Cline recorded the song on her 1962 album, Sentimentally Yours.
- Johnny Tillotson recorded the song on his 1962 album, It Keeps Right On a-Hurtin'.
- The Everly Brothers recorded the song on their 1963 album, The Everly Brothers Sing Great Country Hits.
- Ray Price recorded the song for his 1963 album "Night Life".
- Bobby Vinton recorded the song on his 1965 album, Bobby Vinton Sings for Lonely Nights.
- Gene Vincent released the song as a single in 1966.
- George Jones recorded the song on his 1967 album, Walk Through This World with Me.
- Tammy Wynette recorded the song on her 1968 album, D-I-V-O-R-C-E.
- Bing Crosby recorded his interpretation of the song in 1968 for his album, Hey Jude/Hey Bing!.
- Tony Booth released his version as a single in 1974. It got to number 84 on Billboard's Hot Country Singles chart.
- Rex Allen, Jr. on his 1977 album, The Best of Rex. His recording got to number 8 on Billboard's Hot Country Singles chart.
- Melba Montgomery recorded a version for her 1982 album I Still Care.
- Emmylou Harris included a recording of the song on her 1989 Bluebird album.
