= The Village of St. Bernadette (song) =

- German release picture disc

Single by Andy Williams

from the album The Village of St. Bernadette
- B-side: "I'm So Lonesome I Could Cry"
- Released: December 1959
- Genre: Vocal pop, easy Listening
- Length: 3:18
- Label: Cadence Records 1374
- Songwriter: Eula Parker

Andy Williams singles chronology
"Lonely Street" (1959)	"The Village of St. Bernadette" (1959)	"Wake Me When It's Over" (1960)

"The Village of St. Bernadette" is a song written by Australian singer Eula Parker, who received the 1959 Ivor Novello award for Best Song Musically and Lyrically.

== Background ==
"The Village of St. Bernadette" was written at the end of a week long visit to the Occitania town of Lourdes, site of the Sanctuary of Our Lady of Lourdes commemorating the 1858 visions of Bernadette Soubirous. "I wrote the song on the back of an airmail letter," Parker said, "while...waiting [at Tarbes–Lourdes–Pyrénées Airport] for [the] plane...to Paris".

== Andy Williams recording ==
Recorded by Andy Williams - with the accompaniment of Archie Bleyer's Orchestra - the song reached No. 7 on the Hot 100 in 1960. and was featured on Williams' 1960 album release The Village of St. Bernadette

== Other recordings ==
- Anne Shelton released a version of the song in 1959 that reached No. 27 in the UK.
- Bing Crosby recorded the song for his radio show in 1960.
- Jack Jones recorded the song in 1964 for The Jack Jones Christmas Album.
- Vera Lynn recorded the song in 1967 for a single release and again in 1972 for the album Vera Lynn - Favourite Sacred Songs.

== See also ==
- Our Lady of Lourdes
- Saint Bernadette
- Ave Maria
