= Hawaiian Wedding Song =

"Hawaiian Wedding Song (Ke Kali Nei Au)"

Single by Andy Williams

from the album Two Time Winners
- B-side: "The House of Bamboo"
- Released: December 9, 1958
- Recorded: November 1958
- Genre: Traditional pop
- Length: 2:27
- Label: Cadence
- Songwriters: Al Hoffman, Charles E. King, Dick Manning

Andy Williams singles chronology
"Promise Me, Love" (1958)	"Hawaiian Wedding Song (Ke Kali Nei Au)" (1958)	"Lonely Street" (1959)

"Hawaiian Wedding Song" originally entitled; "Ke Kali Nei Au" (Waiting There for Thee) was adapted from a 1926 love song written by Charles E. King and originally recorded by Helen Desha Beamer in its original (Hawaiian language) version but re-written by Al Hoffman and Dick Manning and renamed as "Hawaiian Wedding Song". The song was recorded by Bing Crosby, Andy Williams and Elvis Presley.

In the US, Andy Williams' version (accompanied by Archie Bleyer and his orchestra, with backing vocals by Anita Wood) was released as a single in 1958 and reached number 11 on the Billboard Hot 100 chart and number 27 on the R&B chart. In the UK, a single version by Julie Rogers went to number 31 on the UK Singles Chart in 1965. Elvis Presley sang another version of the song in the 1961 film Blue Hawaii. In 1964, Hong Kong female singer Kong Ling covered the song on her LP album This World We Live In with Diamond Records (now under UMG).

An earlier English version of "Ke Kali Nei Au" was by Bing Crosby and it was titled "Here Ends the Rainbow" with Johnny Burke supplying the lyrics. This was recorded on February 9, 1951, with Betty Mullin and Lyn Murray and His Orchestra.

== Other notable recordings ==
- Brook Benton - included in the album Brook Benton Sings the Standards (1981).
- Pat Boone and Shirley Boone - for their album I Love You Truly (1962).
- Teresa Brewer - for her album Aloha from Teresa (1961).
- Perry Como - for his album The Songs I Love (1963)
- Vic Damone - for his album Strange Enchantment (1962).
- John Gary - included in his album The Nearness of You (1965).
- Jim Reeves - for the album The International Jim Reeves (1963).
- Marty Robbins - for his album Hawaii's Calling Me (1963).
- Roger Whittaker - included in the album Sincerely Yours (1990).
- Tammy Wynette - for her album You and Me (1976).
- Donny Osmond - from his album A Time For Us (1973).
- James Blackwood - from his album The Masters V Present James Blackwood In Aloha Time With Bud Tutmarc (1987).
