= Andy Williams =

American singer (1927–2012)

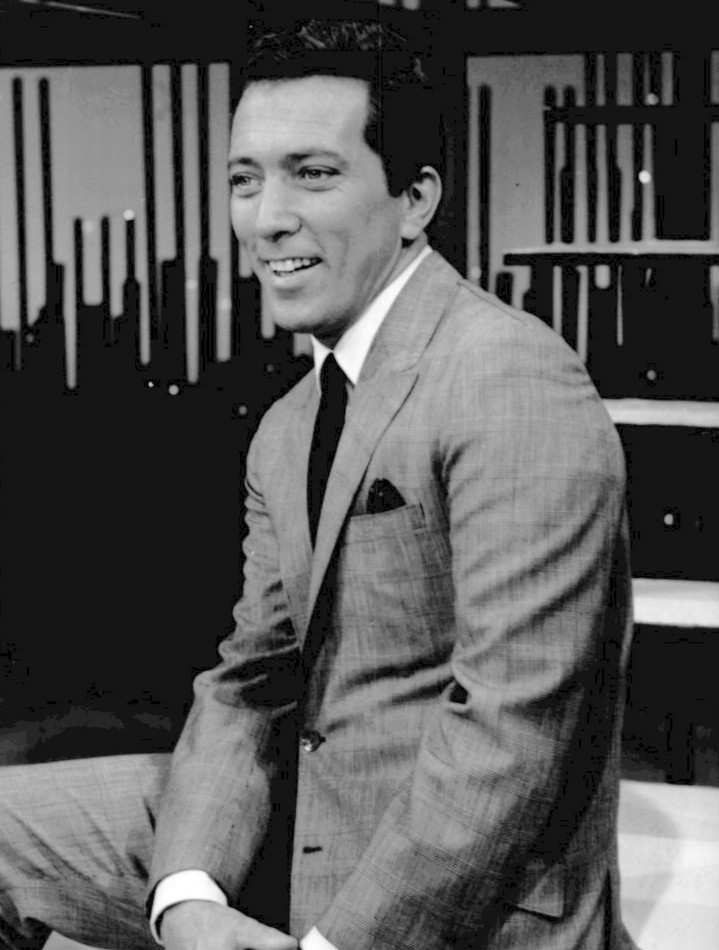
- Williams in 1963

Background information
- Born: Howard Andrew Williams; December 3, 1927; Wall Lake, Iowa, US
- Died: September 25, 2012 (aged 84) Branson, Missouri, US
- Genres: Traditional pop; easy listening
- Occupation: Singer
- Years active: 1938–2012
- Labels: Cadence; Columbia; London; Polydor
- Formerly of: The Williams Brothers
- Spouses: Claudine Longet (m. 1961; div. 1975) Debbie Haas (m. 1991)
- Website: andywilliams.com
- Children: 3

Howard Andrew Williams (December 3, 1927 – September 25, 2012) was an American singer. He recorded 43 albums in his career, of which 15 have been gold certified and three platinum certified. Williams was also nominated for six Grammy Awards. He hosted The Andy Williams Show, a television variety show, from 1962 to 1971, along with numerous TV specials. The Andy Williams Show won three Emmy Awards. Williams sold more than 45 million records worldwide, including more than 10 million certified units in the United States.

Williams was active in the music industry for over 70 years until his death in September 2012 from bladder cancer at age 84.

== Early life and education ==
Williams was born in Wall Lake, Iowa, on December 3, 1927, to Florence (née Finley) and Jay Emerson Williams, who worked in insurance and the post office. By 1935, he was living in Des Moines, Iowa. While living in Cheviot, Ohio, Williams attended Western Hills High School in Cincinnati, Ohio. He finished high school at University High School, in Los Angeles, because of his family's move to California. By 1945, Williams had moved to West Los Angeles, California. At age 17, he joined the United States Merchant Marine and served until the end of World War II.

== Career ==
=== 1938–1952: Early career ===
Williams had three older brothers: Bob, Don, and Dick Williams. His first performance was in a children's choir at the local Presbyterian church. Willams and his brothers formed the Williams Brothers quartet in late 1938, and they performed on radio in the Midwest, first at WHO in Des Moines, Iowa, and later at WLS in Chicago, and WLW in Cincinnati.

Moving to Los Angeles in 1943, the Williams Brothers sang with Bing Crosby on his 1944 hit record "Swinging on a Star". They appeared in four musical films: Janie (1944), Kansas City Kitty (1944), Something in the Wind (1947), and Ladies' Man (1947).

A persistent myth alleges that as a teenager, the future singing star dubbed the singing for Lauren Bacall's character in the 1944 feature film To Have and Have Not. According to authoritative sources, including Howard Hawks and Bacall herself, this was not true. Williams and some female singers were tested to dub for Bacall because of fears that she lacked the necessary vocal skills, but those fears were overshadowed by the desire to have Bacall do her own singing despite her imperfect vocal talent.

The Williams Brothers were signed by Metro-Goldwyn-Mayer (MGM) to appear in Anchors Aweigh and Ziegfeld Follies (1945), but before they went before the cameras, the oldest brother, Bob, was drafted into military service and the group's contract was canceled. Kay Thompson, a former radio star who was now head of the vocal department at MGM, had a nose for talent and hired the remaining three Williams brothers to sing in her large choir on many soundtracks for MGM films, including The Harvey Girls (1946). When Bob completed his military service, Kay hired all four brothers to sing on the soundtrack to Good News (1947).

By then, Thompson was tired of working behind the scenes at MGM, so with the four Williams boys as her backup singers and dancers, she formed a nightclub act, Kay Thompson and the Williams Brothers. They made their debut in Las Vegas in 1947 and became an overnight sensation. Within a year, they were the highest-paid nightclub act in the world, breaking records wherever they appeared.

Williams revealed in his memoir Moon River and Me that Thompson and he became romantically involved while on tour despite the age difference (he was 19 and she was 38). The act broke up in 1949, but reunited for another hugely successful tour from the fall of 1951 through the summer of 1953. After that, the four brothers went their separate ways. A complete itinerary of both tours is listed on the Kay Thompson biography website.

Williams and Thompson still remained very close, both personally and professionally. She mentored his emergence as a solo singing star. Thompson also coached Williams, wrote his arrangements, and composed many songs that he recorded, including his 1958 top-20 hit "Promise Me, Love", and later, "Kay Thompson's Jingle Bells" on his 1964 number-one The Andy Williams Christmas Album. Using her contacts in the business, Thompson helped Williams land his breakthrough television gig as a featured singer for two and a half years on Tonight Starring Steve Allen; it helped that the producer of the series, Bill Harbach, was Thompson's former aide-de-camp. Thompson also got Williams his breakthrough recording contract with Cadence Records, whose owner, Archie Bleyer, had gotten early career breaks because of Kay and owed her a favor. Meanwhile, Williams sang backup on many of Thompson's recordings through the 1950s, including her top-40 hit "Eloise", based on her bestselling books about the mischievous little girl who lives at the Plaza Hotel in New York.

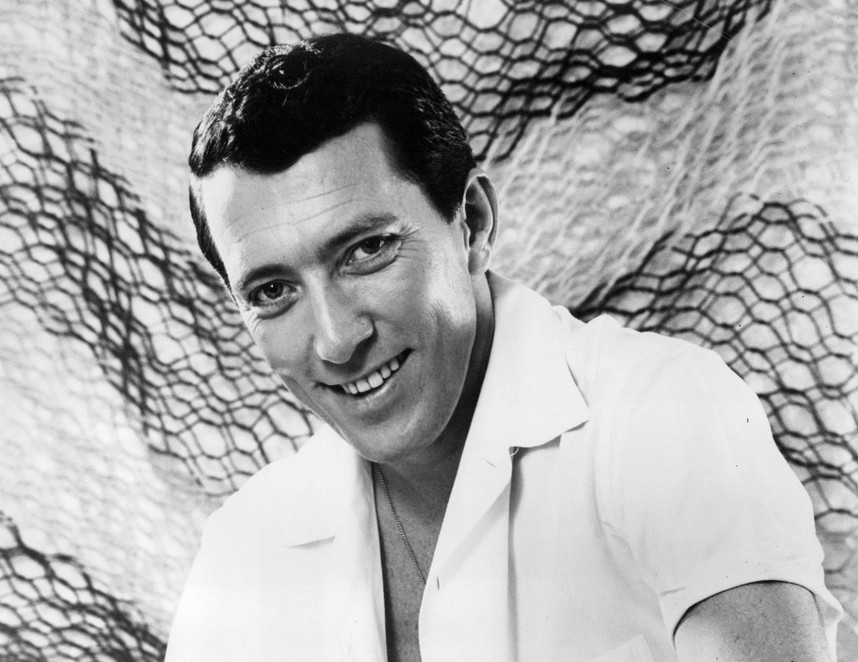
Williams in a publicity photo, 1960

Thompson also served as a creative consultant and vocal arranger on Williams's three summer-replacement network television series in 1957, 1958, and 1959. During the summer of 1961, Thompson traveled with Williams and coached him throughout his starring role in a summer-stock tour of the musical Pal Joey. Their personal and professional relationship finally ended in 1962, after Williams met and married Claudine Longet, and Thompson moved to Rome.

=== 1953–1961: Cadence years ===
Williams's solo career began in 1953. He recorded six sides for RCA Victor's label "X", but none was a popular hit.

After landing a spot as a regular on the Tonight Starring Steve Allen in 1954, Williams was signed to a recording contract with Cadence Records, a small label in New York, run by conductor Archie Bleyer. Williams' third single, "Canadian Sunset", reached number seven in the top 10 in August 1956; it was followed in February 1957 by his only Billboard number-one hit, "Butterfly", a cover of a Charlie Gracie record. "Butterfly" was also number one for two weeks on the UK Singles Chart in May 1957. More hit records followed, including "Hawaiian Wedding Song" (US number 11), "Are You Sincere?" (US number three in February 1958), "The Village of St. Bernadette" (US number seven in December 1959), "Lonely Street" (US number five in September 1959), and "I Like Your Kind of Love" with Peggy Powers (US number eight in May 1957).

=== 1962–1980: The Columbia years ===
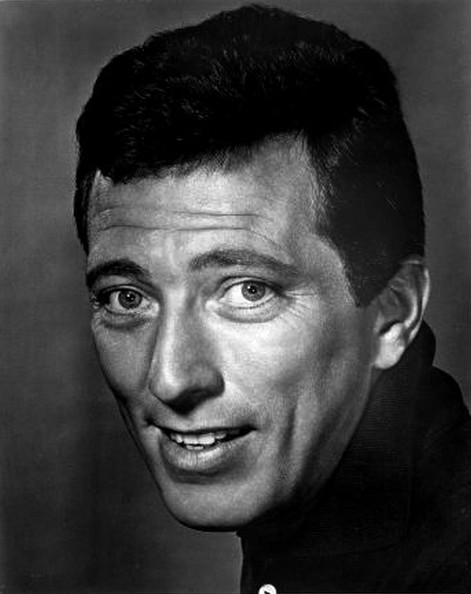
Williams in 1963

On December 15, 1961, Williams married Claudine Longet and signed with Columbia Records. His first album with Columbia, Danny Boy and Other Songs I Love to Sing, was a chart success, peaking at number 19. Williams was then asked to sing "Moon River", the theme from Breakfast at Tiffany's, at the 1962 Academy Awards, where it won Best Original Song. Archie Bleyer at Cadence had previously told Williams that "Moon River" would not be a hit, but the Columbia producers encouraged Williams to record the song along with 11 other movie themes for an album. After Williams performed the song at the awards show, it became a hit. Moon River and Other Great Movie Themes then sold across the country, garnering critical acclaim and propelling Williams into stardom. The album remained on the charts for the next three years and peaked at number three. In 1963, Williams' producer, Robert Mersey, encouraged him to record "Can't Get Used to Losing You" as the B-side to "Days of Wine and Roses". Williams initially did not like the pop song, preferring the Mancini tune, but "Can't Get Used to Losing You" reached number two in the US and UK. The album containing both songs, Days of Wine and Roses and Other TV Requests, topped the album charts at number one for 16 weeks.

From 1962 to 1972, Williams was one of the most popular vocalists in the country and was signed to what was at that time the biggest recording contract in history. He was primarily an album artist, and at one time, Williams had recorded more gold albums than any solo performer except Frank Sinatra, Johnny Mathis, and Elvis Presley. By 1973, he had earned as many as 17 gold-album awards. Among his hit albums from this period were The Andy Williams Christmas Album, Dear Heart, The Shadow of Your Smile, Love, Andy, Happy Heart, Get Together with Andy Williams, Love Story, and Love Theme from the Godfather. These recordings, along with his natural affinity for the music of the 1960s and early 1970s, combined to make Williams one of the premier easy-listening singers of that era.

In the UK, Williams continued to reach high chart status until 1978. The albums Dear Heart (1965), Love Andy (1967), Can't Help Falling in Love (1970), Andy Williams Show (1970), Home Lovin' Man (number one, 1971), Solitaire (1973), The Way We Were (1974), and Reflections (1978) all reached the top 10.

Williams forged an indirect collaborative relationship with Henry Mancini, although they never recorded together. Both "Moon River" and "Days of Wine and Roses" were written by Mancini, with lyrics by Johnny Mercer. Williams sang Mancini's "Dear Heart" at the 1965 Academy Awards and "The Sweetheart Tree" (also written with Mercer) at the 1966 Awards.

On August 5, 1966, the 14-story, 700-room Caesars Palace casino and nightclub opened in Las Vegas, Nevada, with the stage production of "Rome Swings", in which Williams starred. He performed to a sold-out crowd in the Circus Maximus showroom. He headlined for Caesars for the next 20 years.

On September 17, 1968, Columbia released a single of two songs Williams sang at the funeral of his close friend Robert F. Kennedy: "The Battle Hymn of the Republic" and Franz Schubert's "Ave Maria". These were never released on a long-playing record, but have appeared in several compilations of Williams's output.

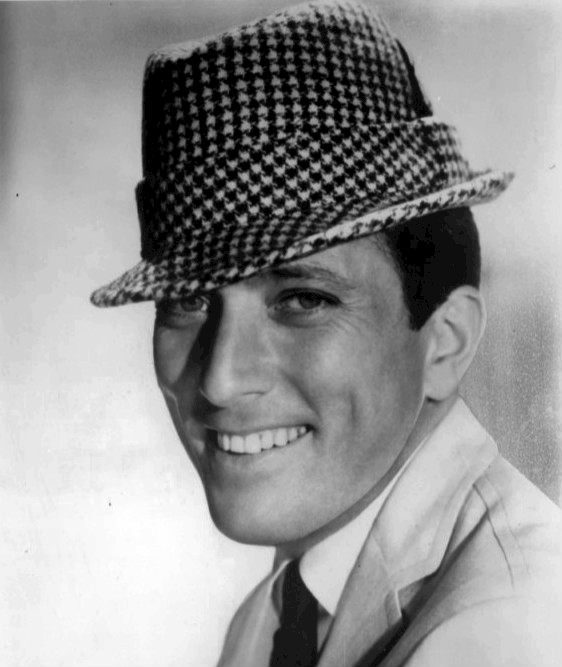
Williams in 1966

Williams also competed in the teen-oriented singles market and had several charting hits, including "Can't Get Used to Losing You", "Happy Heart", and "Where Do I Begin", the theme song from the 1970 blockbuster film Love Story. In addition, Williams hit the top 10 of the UK Singles Chart with "Almost There" (1964), "Can't Help Falling in Love" (1970), "Home Lovin' Man" (1970), and "Solitaire" (1973).

Williams and Petula Clark recorded "Happy Heart" around the same time, just before his guest appearance on her second NBC-TV special. Unaware that she was releasing the song as a single, he asked to perform it on the show. The exposure ultimately led to his having the bigger hit with the song. The song "Happy Heart" was used for the final scene and end credits of Danny Boyle's award-winning directorial debut film Shallow Grave (1994).

=== 1962–1971: The Andy Williams Show ===
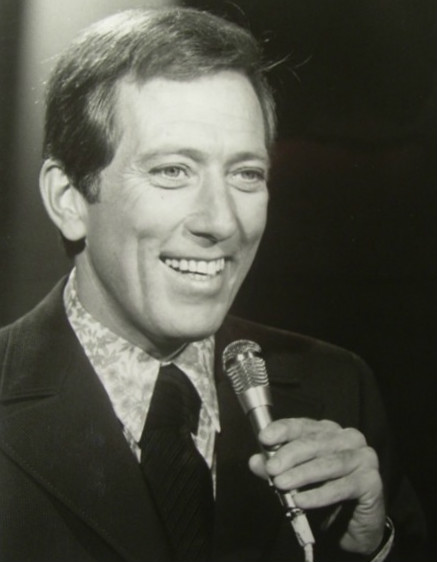
Williams in 1969

Building on his experience with Allen and some short-term variety shows in the 1950s, Williams became the star of his own weekly television variety show in the fall of 1962. Though canceled after 1963 owing to low ratings, the show was then sponsored to make 12 weekly specials in the 1963–64 season. This series, The Andy Williams Show, won three Emmy Awards for outstanding variety program. Among his series regulars were the Osmond Brothers. Williams gave up the variety show in 1971 while it was still popular, continuing with three specials per year. His Christmas specials, which appeared regularly until 1974 and intermittently from 1982 into the 1990s, were among the most popular of the genre. Williams recorded eight Christmas albums over the years, and was known as "Mr. Christmas", due to his perennial Christmas specials and the success of "It's the Most Wonderful Time of the Year".

Williams hosted the most Grammy telecasts—seven consecutive shows—from the 13th Annual Grammy Awards in 1971 through to the 19th Awards in 1977. He returned to television with a syndicated half-hour series in 1976–77.

In the early 1970s, when the Nixon administration attempted to deport John Lennon, Williams was an outspoken defender of the former Beatle's right to stay in the United States. Williams is included in the montage of caricatures on the cover of Ringo Starr's 1973 album, Ringo.

Williams performed during the halftime show of Super Bowl VII in January 1973, held at Los Angeles Memorial Coliseum.

=== 1991–2012: At Moon River Theatre ===
In June 1991, Williams' brother Don invited him to the small Ozarks town of Branson, Missouri. At the time, Don was the manager for Ray Stevens, who had just opened a theater in Branson. While attending Stevens' show, Williams was encouraged by numerous Branson guests to open a venue in the town. This led Williams to build the Moon River Theatre in Branson in time for the 1992 season. Named for his signature song, it went on to become the first venue of its kind to be featured in Architectural Digest, and won the 1992 Conservation Award from the State of Missouri.

Williams originally envisioned marble in the style of the Dorothy Chandler Pavilion in Los Angeles, but opted instead for a design blending in with the rough terrain of the Ozark Mountains. The Larson Company of Tucson, Arizona, fabricated a section of rock on Missouri Highway 76 and added waterfalls, koi-filled ponds, ferns, and trees native to the Ozarks, which were then incorporated inside, with trees and plants throughout all three lobbies. Oak floors accompanied African ribbon-striped mahogany walls filled with pictures from the Andy Williams Show and art from Williams' personal collection, which included works by Frankenthaler, Diebenkorn, Oldenburg, Pollock, Klee, and Moore.

The auditorium accommodated 2,054 people. Seats and carpets matched Williams' Navajo rug collection in forest green, magenta, gold, and blue. On display inside the auditorium were nineteen kimonos. On stage, Williams was joined by Glen Campbell, Ann-Margret, Petula Clark, and Charo.

Williams was the first non-country act in Branson. His success there prompted other pop acts, including Bobby Vinton, Tony Orlando, Wayne Newton, and the Osmond Brothers, to follow.

Williams was featured on three episodes of As the World Turns in 2007, when several characters went to Branson for a concert of "Gwen Munson" held in the Moon River Theatre. The Simpsons featured Williams at his Moon River Theatre in an episode titled "Bart on the Road". Nelson Muntz is an Andy Williams fan and forces the gang to detour to Branson to see his idol. He is reduced to tears as Williams performs "Moon River".

In 2007, Williams opened the adjacent Moon River Grill. The decor featured photos from the Andy Williams Show with such stars as Diana Ross, Elton John, and Sammy Davis Jr., and works by artists including Andy Warhol and Robert Indiana.

In 1995, We Need a Little Christmas became Williams' 18th gold album.

His 1967 recording of "Music to Watch Girls By" became a UK hit to a new young television audience in 1999, when it reached number 9 after being featured in television advertisements for the Fiat Punto and Diet Pepsi, beating the original peak of number 33 in 1967. A new generation was reminded of Williams' recordings and a sell-out UK tour followed, prompting a British revival for Williams. In 2002, he re-recorded "Can't Take My Eyes Off You" as a duet with Denise van Outen; it reached number 23 in the UK. He completed a sold-out tour of the United Kingdom and Asia in the winter and summer of 2007, performing at several major venues including the Royal Albert Hall.

Williams returned to the UK singles charts with his 1963 recording of "It's the Most Wonderful Time of the Year" in 2007, due to an advertisement for Marks & Spencer, reaching number 21 in its first appearance in the British charts. The following year, Williams lip-synched the 45-year-old recording to welcome Santa at the end of the Macy's Thanksgiving Day Parade.

In 2009, Williams appeared on the BBC's Strictly Come Dancing in London, singing "Moon River" to promote the UK edition of The Very Best of Andy Williams LP, which peaked at number 10 in the main pop chart.

== Business ventures ==
In 1964, Williams ultimately became the owner of the Cadence master tapes, which he occasionally licensed to Columbia, including not only his own recordings, but also those of his fellow Cadence-era labelmates: the Everly Brothers, Lenny Welch, the Chordettes, Link Wray, and Johnny Tillotson. In 1968, although he was still under contract with Columbia for his own recordings, Williams formed a separate company called Barnaby Records to handle reissuing of the Cadence materials, especially those of the Everly Brothers (one of the first Barnaby LPs was a double LP set of the Brothers' long out-of-print Cadence hits) and new artists. Barnaby also had several top-40 hits in the 1970s with novelty artist Ray Stevens (who had done a summer replacement show for Williams in 1970), including number-one hits such as "Everything Is Beautiful" in 1970 and "The Streak" in 1974. Also in 1970, Barnaby signed and released the first album by an unknown singer-songwriter named Jimmy Buffett (Down to Earth) produced by Travis Turk.

Columbia was initially the distributor for Barnaby, but later distribution was handled first by MGM Records and then General Recorded Tape. Once Barnaby ceased operating as a working record company at the end of the 1970s, Williams licensed the old Cadence material to various other labels (such as Varèse Sarabande and Rhino in the US) after 1980.

== Politics ==
Williams was among the celebrities in Robert F. Kennedy's entourage at the Ambassador Hotel in Los Angeles when Kennedy was shot and killed by Sirhan Sirhan in June 1968. Williams sang "Battle Hymn of the Republic" at RFK's funeral, at Ethel's request. In August 1969, he and Claudine Longet named their son Bobby after Kennedy. The Williams' friendship with Ethel Kennedy endured, with Williams often escorting Ethel to events in the 1970s. He also raised funds for George McGovern's 1972 presidential campaign, performing at benefit concerts.

During his Branson years, Williams said that he was a lifelong Republican. In 2009, he accused Barack Obama of "following Marxist theory" and "wanting the country to fail". Williams gave Rush Limbaugh permission to use his recording of the song "Born Free" as the theme to the "Animal Rights Update" on Limbaugh's radio show in which a portion of the song was followed by gunfire. "Hey, it's fine with me. I love what you're doing with it," Williams told Limbaugh. The record company later blocked Limbaugh's use of the recording. Williams was a guest on the Glenn Beck Radio Program in 2009.

== Personal life ==
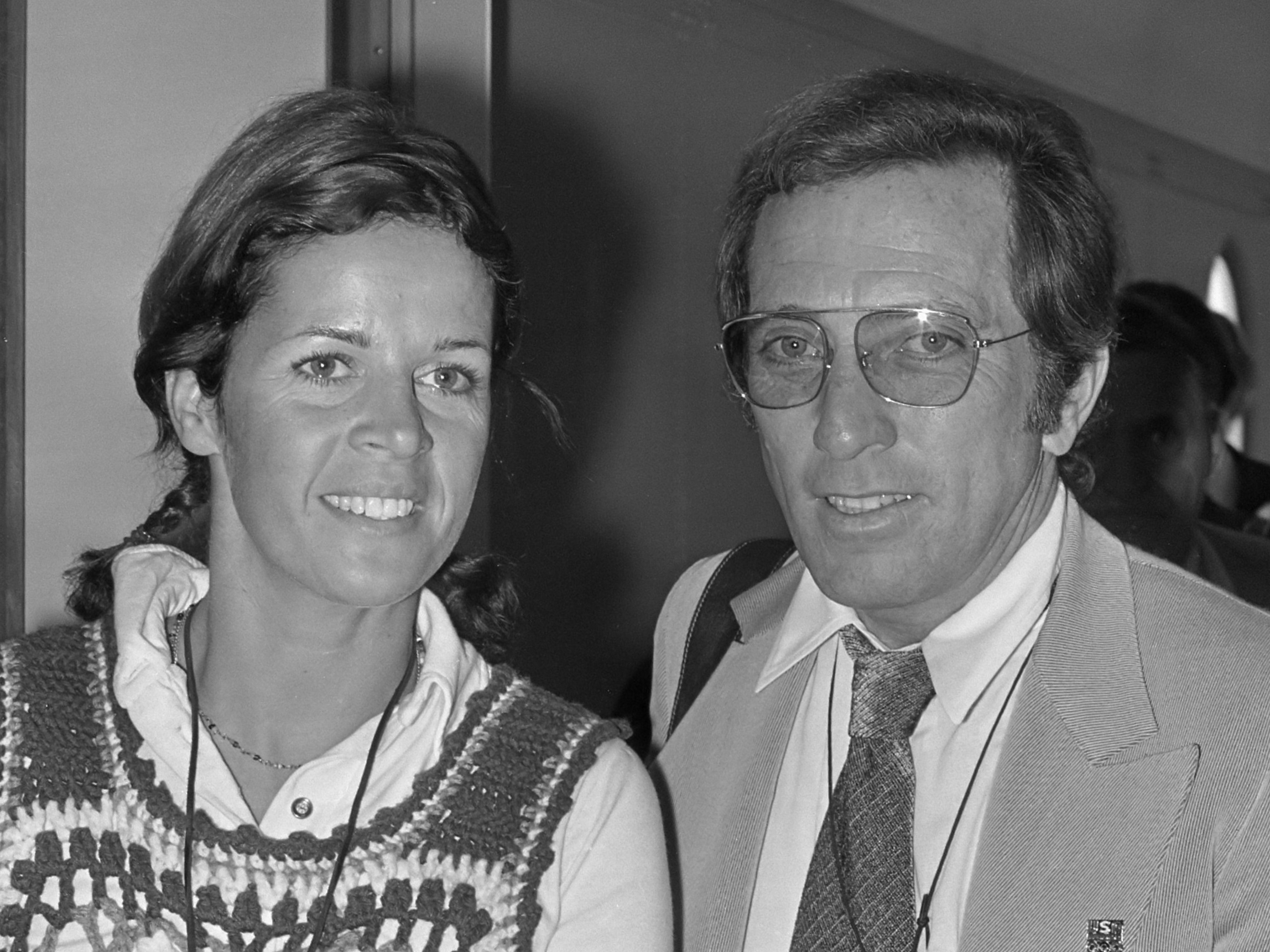
Williams with wife Claudine Longet in 1972

Williams met French-born Claudine Longet in Las Vegas when her car broke down and he offered help. At the time, Longet was a dancer at the Folies Bergère. They got married in 1961, and over the next eight years, had three children: Noelle, Christian, and Robert.After separating in 1970, Williams and Longet divorced five years later, but remained friends. In 1976, Longet was charged with fatally shooting her boyfriend, Spider Sabich, in Aspen. Williams played a public role in the subsequent events, escorting her to and from the courtroom, testifying under oath to her character, and providing financial assistance. Longet claimed that the shooting was accidental and eventually served 30 days in jail.

Williams also had partial ownership of the Phoenix Suns NBA team from the team's inception in 1968 until 1987.

On May 3, 1991, Williams married Debbie Haas, née Meyer, whom he met through a mutual friend. They made their homes at Branson, Missouri, and La Quinta, California, where he was known as the "honorary mayor". Williams was a noted collector of modern art and his homes have been featured in Architectural Digest.

Williams' birthplace in Iowa is now a tourist attraction and is open most of the year.

=== Hobbies ===
Williams was an avid golfer and hosted a PGA Tour golf tournament in San Diego from 1968 to 1988 at Torrey Pines. Then known as the "Andy Williams San Diego Open", the tournament continues as the Farmers Insurance Open, usually in February. He was also a competent ice skater and occasionally skated as part of his television Christmas shows.

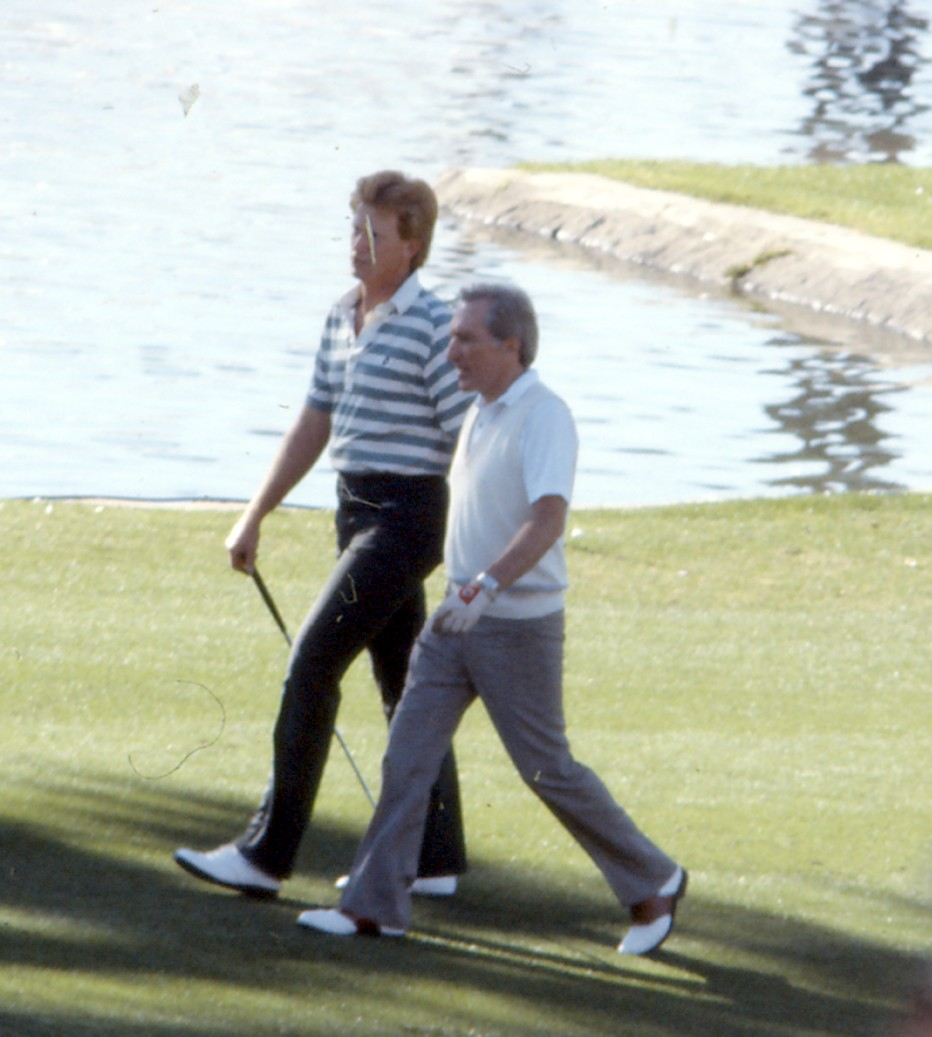
Williams at the Bob Hope Classic golf tournament, 1986

Williams was a noted art collector whose collection was exhibited at the Saint Louis Art Museum in 1997 and 1998. After his death, Williams' collection was split among several auction houses. His paintings went to Christie's New York, where they fetched over $50 million. Williams' folk art collection was sold at Skinner for $2.5 million. His collection of Navajo blankets was sold by Sotheby's on May 21, 2013, yielding just under $1 million.

== Illness and death ==
In an appearance at his theater in 2011, Williams announced that he was diagnosed with bladder cancer. After chemotherapy in Houston, Williams and his wife rented a home in Malibu, California to be close to cancer specialists in Los Angeles.

On September 25, 2012, Williams died aged 84 at his home in Branson. Williams was cremated, and his ashes were sprinkled into the artificial Moon River at his theatre in Branson. The memorial service was held a month later.

== Awards and achievements ==
The Andy Williams Show won three Emmy Awards in 1963, 1966, and 1967 for Outstanding Variety Series.

Andy Williams also earned six Grammy nominations:

Year	Nominated work	Category	Result
1959	"Hawaiian Wedding Song"	Vocal Performance, Male	Nominated
1962	"Danny Boy"	Vocal Performance, Male	Nominated
1964	Days of Wine and Roses and Other TV Requests	Album of the Year	Nominated
1964	"Days of Wine and Roses"	Vocal Performance, Male	Nominated
1965	The Academy Award–Winning "Call Me Irresponsible" and Other Hit Songs from the Movies	Vocal Performance, Male	Nominated
1967	The Shadow of Your Smile	Vocal Performance, Male	Nominated

Other honors include:

- Society of Singers Lifetime Achievement Award, 2008
- Star on the Hollywood Walk of Fame

His version of Silver Bells was also featured in the 2025 film Novocaine.

== Discography ==
Andy Williams' extensive discography began with the release of the 1948 single "Jubilee" as a member of the Williams Brothers alongside Kay Thompson. He recorded his first solo album, Andy Williams Sings Steve Allen, eight years later, and remained active in the music industry for the next 56 years, completing 43 studio albums, alongside compilation albums and more.

=== Studio albums ===
- Andy Williams Sings Steve Allen (1956)
- Andy Williams Sings Rodgers and Hammerstein (1958)
- Two Time Winners (1959)
- To You Sweetheart, Aloha (1959)
- Lonely Street (1959)
- The Village of St. Bernadette (1960)
- Under Paris Skies (1960)
- Danny Boy and Other Songs I Love to Sing (1962)
- Moon River and Other Great Movie Themes (1962)
- Million Seller Songs (1962)
- Warm and Willing (1962)
- Days of Wine and Roses and Other TV Requests (1963)
- The Andy Williams Christmas Album (1963)
- The Wonderful World of Andy Williams (1964)
- The Academy Award–Winning "Call Me Irresponsible" and Other Hit Songs from the Movies (1964)
- The Great Songs from "My Fair Lady" and Other Broadway Hits (1964)
- Andy Williams' Dear Heart (1965)
- Merry Christmas (1965)
- The Shadow of Your Smile (1966)
- In the Arms of Love (1966)
- Born Free (1967)
- Love, Andy (1967)
- Honey (1968)
- Happy Heart (1969)
- Get Together with Andy Williams (1969)
- Raindrops Keep Fallin' on My Head (1970)
- The Andy Williams Show (1970)
- Love Story (1971)
- You've Got a Friend (1971)
- Love Theme from "The Godfather" (1972)
- Alone Again (Naturally) (1972)
- Solitaire (1973)
- The Way We Were (1974)
- Christmas Present (1974)
- You Lay So Easy on My Mind (1974)
- The Other Side of Me (1975)
- Andy (1976)
- Let's Love While We Can (1980)
- Greatest Love Classics (1984)
- Close Enough for Love (1986)
- I Still Believe in Santa Claus (1990)
- Nashville (1991)
- We Need a Little Christmas (1995)
- I Don't Remember Ever Growing Up (2007)

== Filmography ==
- 1944: Janie
- 1944: Kansas City Kitty
- 1947: Ladies' Man
- 1947: Something in the Wind
- 1960: The Man in the Moon
- 1964: I'd Rather Be Rich
- 1980: The Muppet Show, special guest star
- 1999: Dorival Caymmi (documentary)
- 2009: Sebring (documentary)

== Television ==
- 1962-1971: The Andy Williams Show

=== Bibliography ===
- Williams, Andy (2009). Moon River & Me. Viking. ISBN 978-0-670-02117-8.
