= Canadian Sunset =

- Italian release picture sleeve

Single by Eddie Heywood and Hugo Winterhalter

from the album Canadian Sunset
- B-side: "This Is Real (We're In Love, We're In Love, We're In Love)"
- Released: July 1956
- Genre: Pop, Jazz
- Length: 2:50
- Label: RCA Victor 6537
- Composer: Eddie Heywood
- Lyricist: Norman Gimbel

Eddie Heywood and Hugo Winterhalter singles chronology
| "Land of Dreams" (1954) | "Canadian Sunset" (1956) |

"Canadian Sunset" is a popular song with music by jazz pianist Eddie Heywood and lyrics by Norman Gimbel. An instrumental version by Heywood and Hugo Winterhalter reached No. 2 on the Billboard Hot 100 chart and No. 7 on the R&B chart in 1956. A version sung by Andy Williams was also popular that year, reaching No. 7 on the Billboard chart. The Sounds Orchestral, conducted by Johnny Pearson, hit the Easy Listening chart reaching No. 14 and the Billboard Hot 100 in 1965 reaching No. 76. In Canada their version reached No.25 on the Top 40 charts.

== Notable recordings ==
The tune has been covered by a number of pop, jazz, R&B, and country performers:

- Wes Montgomery (guitar) recorded the piece with small combo. The recording features his signature octave melodic technique.
- Danny Gatton (guitar) playing with Buddy Emmons (pedal steel) produced a funky version of the tune with the "redneck jazz" sound they developed (jazz played on instruments normally relegated to country music)
- George Shearing (piano) recorded the piece with his quintet along with an orchestral arrangement of his writing.
- Floyd Cramer (piano)
- Gene Ammons (tenor saxophone) on the 1960 album Boss Tenor
- Earl Bostic (alto saxophone)
- Earl Grant (organ)
- The Impacts (R. Baber, H. Brooks, H. Powell, C. Mattocks and K. Seymour) recorded a doo-wop version in 1959 that can be found on The Doo Wop Box II.
- Etta Jones (vocals) recorded this tune on her album Something Nice in 1961
- Cedar Walton made it funky on the 1976 album Beyond Mobius
- Sam Cooke did a version on his You Send Me album
- Dean Martin recorded a version on his 1959 album A Winter Romance
- Beegie Adair (piano) recorded the piece with her trio on Moments to Remember in 2009
- Carey T. Smith recorded a version on his 2009 album Birdy
- Horst Jankowski recorded a version on his 1965 album More Genius of Jankowski
- Earl Klugh recorded a version on his 2008 album The Spice of Life
- Doc Severinsen recorded a version on his 1967 album The New Sound of Today's Big Band
