= Cadence Records =

American record label

- Founded: 1952; 74 years ago
- Founder: Archie Bleyer
- Defunct: 1964; 62 years ago
- Genre: Various
- Country of origin: United States
- Location: New York City, U.S.

Cadence Records was an American record company based in New York City whose labels had a picture of a metronome. It was founded by Archie Bleyer, who had been the musical director and orchestra leader for Arthur Godfrey in 1952. Cadence also launched a short-lived jazz subsidiary, Candid Records.

The first recording star for Cadence was a Godfrey alumnus, Julius La Rosa. Other Godfrey alumni signed to the label included the Chordettes. Bleyer had written a few hit songs in 1932–34 (Fletcher Henderson's "Business in F" is a good example) and had a band that recorded for ARC in 1934 and 1935 (his records were issued on Vocalion, Melotone, Perfect and Romeo).

In October 1954, Godfrey fired singer Julius La Rosa, causing a storm of controversy.

Almost immediately after firing La Rosa, Bleyer was fired from the Godfrey show, for signing Don McNeill, Chicago-based talk host, to a record deal and producing spoken-word records for Cadence featuring. Godfrey considered McNeill a rival. Don McNeill's Breakfast Club aired on ABC Radio opposite Godfrey's morning show, although McNeill's success was nowhere on a par with that of Godfrey.

The label also issued the early recordings of Andy Williams and the Everly Brothers, as well as Johnny Tillotson and Lenny Welch. Virtuoso jazz/classical pianist Don Shirley was signed to Cadence in the 1950s and 1960s. One of Cadence's most popular songs in the 1950s was "Eloise", written and sung by Kay Thompson.

Cadence charted nearly 100 American singles between 1953 and 1964. The label also released the 1962 bestselling parody album The First Family, starring comedic actor and impressionist Vaughn Meader. Acclaimed at that time as the fastest-selling album in history, this White House satire on the Kennedy family and Capitol Hill politics remained at #1 on the Billboard 200 for 12 weeks. Featuring Meader's impression of President John F. Kennedy, the sketch revue also included takes on First Lady Jacqueline Kennedy, Soviet Premier Nikita Khrushchev, and Vice-President Lyndon Johnson. A sequel album, The First Family Volume Two, released in March 1963, reached #4. Both albums were immediately withdrawn following Kennedy's assassination in November, 1963.

The departures of the Everly Brothers in 1960 (to Warner Bros. Records) and of Andy Williams in 1961 (to Columbia Records), along with radical changes in public taste and the music business brought on by the British Invasion, led to the rapid decline of Cadence. By 1964, Bleyer opted to shut down the label. Bleyer had competing offers from Kapp Records, Liberty Records and Andy Williams, who initially wanted to purchase just the masters of his own Cadence recordings. Bleyer's sale specified a complete purchase of the entire Cadence catalog (including Candid Records), which Williams accepted. Williams reissued his old Cadence recordings on Columbia and formed Barnaby Records to manage the rest of the Cadence catalog.

== See also ==
- List of record labels
