= The Very Best of Andy Williams (2009 album) =

The Very Best Of Andy Williams

Compilation album by Andy Williams
- Released: October 5th, 2009
- Recorded: 1962–1973
- Genre: Traditional pop; vocal pop; standards; AM Pop; early pop/rock; soft rock; film music; soundtracks
- Length: 76:37
- Label: Sony Music Entertainment

Andy Williams chronology
Moon River: The Very Best Of Andy Williams (2009)	The Very Best Of Andy Williams (2009)	The Classic Christmas Album (2013)

The Very Best of Andy Williams is a compilation album by American pop singer Andy Williams that was released in the UK on October 5, 2009. A note from Williams inside the CD booklet explains that the album "was put together to coincide with my memoir Moon River and Me, published by Orion Press. It includes many of the songs that you made hits. I truly appreciate that, and I hope you enjoy the songs we selected for this CD." This compilation includes recordings that either charted in the UK but not in the US ("Can't Take My Eyes off You", "It's So Easy", "May Each Day") or charted much higher on the UK singles chart than they did on the Billboard Hot 100 in the US ("Almost There", "Can't Help Falling in Love"). It entered the UK albums chart on October 17, 2009, and reached number 10 during its six weeks there.

On July 22, 2013, the British Phonographic Industry awarded the album with Gold certification for sales of 100,000 units.

An 18-track compilation album released in conjunction with the book publication in the US was titled Moon River: The Very Best of Andy Williams and had the same cover photo and design but had only nine of the 24 tracks on this album in common.

== Track listing ==
1. "Moon River" (Henry Mancini, Johnny Mercer) – 2:46
  - recorded on 1/4/62 for his album Moon River and Other Great Movie Themes
2. "Can't Get Used to Losing You" (Jerome "Doc" Pomus, Mort Shuman) – 2:25
  - rec. 12/2/62; UK singles chart: #2 (1 week)
3. "Music to Watch Girls By" (Sid Ramin, Tony Velona) – 2:38
  - rec. 2/21/67; UK singles chart: #33
4. "Can't Take My Eyes Off You" (Bob Crewe, Bob Gaudio) – 3:15
  - rec. 9/18/67; UK singles chart: #5
5. "The Impossible Dream (The Quest)" from Man of La Mancha (Joe Darion, Mitch Leigh) – 2:39
  - rec. 1968 for his album Honey
6. "Happy Heart" (James Last, Jackie Rae) – 3:15
  - rec. 3/8/69; UK singles chart: #19
7. "Solitaire" (Phil Cody, Neil Sedaka) – 4:22
  - rec. 7/73; UK singles chart: #4
8. "Never Can Say Goodbye" (Clifton Davis) – 3:33
  - rec. 4/22/71 for his album You've Got a Friend
9. "Raindrops Keep Fallin' on My Head" (Burt Bacharach, Hal David) – 3:11
  - rec. 2/24/70 for his album Raindrops Keep Fallin' on My Head
10. "It's So Easy" (Dor Lee, Dave Watkins) – 2:29
  - rec. 1/14/70 & 1/16/70; UK singles chart: #13
11. "Born Free" (John Barry, Don Black) – 2:27
  - rec. 3/2/67 for his album Born Free
12. "Up, Up and Away" (Jimmy Webb) – 2:36
  - rec. 1968 for his album Honey
13. "Home Lovin' Man" (Roger Cook, Roger Greenaway, Tony Macaulay) – 3:10
  - rec. 8/29/70; UK singles chart: #7
14. "Can't Help Falling in Love" (George Weiss, Hugo Peretti, Luigi Creatore) – 3:15
  - rec. 1/14/70; UK singles chart: #3
15. "MacArthur Park" (Jimmy Webb) – 5:03
  - rec. 1/4/71 for his album Love Theme from 'The Godfather'
16. "We've Only Just Begun" (Roger Nichols, Paul Williams) – 3:15
  - rec. 12/7/70 for his album Love Story
17. "Almost There" (Jerry Keller, Gloria Shayne) – 2:59
  - rec. 2/28/64; UK singles chart: #2 (3 weeks)
18. "Abraham, Martin and John" (Dick Holler) – 3:43
  - rec. 1969 for his album Happy Heart
19. "(Where Do I Begin) Love Story" (Francis Lai, Carl Sigman) – 3:10
  - rec. 12/17/70; UK singles chart: #4
20. "Ave Maria" performed with the St. Charles Borromeo Choir (Franz Schubert) – 4:55
  - rec. 7/17/68; B-side of "Battle Hymn of the Republic" (1968)
21. "The Look of Love" (Burt Bacharach, Hal David) – 2:55
  - rec. 1967 for his album Love, Andy
22. "May Each Day" (Mort Green, George Wyle) – 2:54
  - rec. 1/16/63; UK singles chart: #19 (1966)
23. "Somethin' Stupid" (C. Carson Parks) – 2:59
  - rec. 1967 for his album Love, Andy
24. "It's the Most Wonderful Time of the Year" (Edward Pola, George Wyle) – 2:32
  - rec. 9/12/63 for The Andy Williams Christmas Album

== Personnel ==
- Artie Butler – arranger ("Home Lovin' Man", "MacArthur Park", "We've Only Just Begun")
- Al Capps – arranger ("Abraham, Martin and John", "Can't Help Falling in Love", "Happy Heart", "It's So Easy"), arranger/conductor ("Raindrops Keep Fallin' on My Head")
- Nick DeCaro – arranger/producer ("Born Free", "Can't Take My Eyes Off You", "The Impossible Dream (The Quest)", "The Look of Love", "Music to Watch Girls By", "Somethin' Stupid", "Up, Up and Away")
- Ernie Freeman – arranger ("Never Can Say Goodbye")
- Jerry Fuller – producer ("Abraham, Martin and John", "Happy Heart")
- Dick Glasser – producer ("Can't Help Falling in Love", "Home Lovin' Man", "It's So Easy", "Love Story", "MacArthur Park", "Never Can Say Goodbye", "Raindrops Keep Fallin' on My Head", "We've Only Just Begun")
- Dick Hazard – arranger ("Love Story")
- Eddie Karam – conductor ("Can't Take My Eyes Off You", "The Look of Love", "Somethin' Stupid")
- Johnny Mandel – arranger ("It's the Most Wonderful Time of the Year")
- Robert Mersey – arranger/conductor/producer ("Almost There", "Can't Get Used to Losing You", "May Each Day", "Moon River"), conductor/producer ("It's the Most Wonderful Time of the Year")
- Richard Perry – producer ("Solitaire")
- The St. Charles Borromeo Choir – background vocals ("Ave Maria")
- Andy Williams – producer ("Ave Maria"); vocalist

== Bibliography ==
- Whitburn, Joel (2004), Joel Whitburn Presents Top R&B/Hip-Hop Singles, 1942–2004, Record Research Inc., ISBN 0-89820-160-8
- Whitburn, Joel (2007), Joel Whitburn Presents Billboard Top Adult Songs, 1961–2006, Record Research Inc., ISBN 0-89820-169-1
- Whitburn, Joel (2009), Joel Whitburn's Top Pop Singles, 1955–2008, Record Research Inc., ISBN 0-89820-180-2
