= Reflections (Andy Williams album) =

Compilation album by Andy Williams
- Released: December 30, 1977
- Recorded: 1962–1977
- Genre: Traditional pop; vocal pop; standards; soft rock; film music; soundtracks
- Length: 65:58
- Label: CBS Records

Andy Williams chronology
Andy (1976)	Reflections (1977)	Let's Love While We Can (1980)

Professional ratings
Review scores
Source	Rating
The Encyclopedia of Popular Music	3/5 stars

Reflections is a compilation album by American pop singer Andy Williams that was released in the UK on December 30, 1977, by the CBS Records division of Columbia. The subtitle on the cover reads, "A collection of 20 of my favorite songs", and a statement from Williams in the liner notes says, "Songs have very special memories for all of us. They pinpoint moments in our time. On this album I have chosen 20 songs that do just that. I hope you like them." While there was one new song ("Sad"), the collection was otherwise a balanced mix of album cuts and chart hits from his years with Columbia Records, including the seven top 10 UK singles he'd had during this period.

On January 20, 1978, the album was awarded with Gold certification by the British Phonographic Industry for sales of 100,000 units in the UK. It entered the UK album chart the following week, on January 28, and reached number 2 over the course of 17 weeks.

The album was released on compact disc in 2007.

== Track listing ==
=== Side one ===
1. "Moon River" (Henry Mancini, Johnny Mercer) – 2:46
  - recorded on 1/4/62 for his album Moon River and Other Great Movie Themes
2. "Sad" (Robbin Mannix, Debbie Shelton) – 3:54
  - rec. 1977; non-charting UK single
3. "Both Sides Now" (Joni Mitchell) – 3:43
  - rec. 11/17/69 for his album Raindrops Keep Fallin' on My Head
4. "Home Lovin' Man" (Roger Cook, Roger Greenaway, Tony Macaulay) – 3:10
  - rec. 8/29/70; UK singles chart: #7
5. "Seasons in the Sun" (Jacques Brel, Rod McKuen) – 4:41
  - rec. 3/74 for his album The Way We Were
6. "Days of Wine and Roses" (Henry Mancini, Johnny Mercer) – 2:48
  - rec. 1/16/63 for his album Days of Wine and Roses and Other TV Requests
7. "Happy Heart" (James Last, Jackie Rae) – 3:15
  - rec. 3/8/69; UK singles chart: #19
8. "Born Free" (John Barry, Don Black) – 2:27
  - rec. 1967 for his album Born Free
9. "(Where Do I Begin) Love Story" (Francis Lai, Carl Sigman) – 3:10
  - rec. 12/17/70; UK singles chart: #4
10. "Almost There" from I'd Rather Be Rich ( Jerry Keller, Gloria Shayne) – 2:59
  - rec. 1965; UK singles chart: #2 (3 weeks)

=== Side two ===
1. "Can't Help Falling in Love" (Luigi Creatore, Hugo Peretti, George David Weiss) – 3:15
  - rec. 1/14/70; UK singles chart: #3
2. "Without You" (Tom Evans, Peter Ham) – 3:16
  - rec. 2/1/72 for his album Love Theme from 'The Godfather'
3. "Can't Get Used to Losing You" (Jerome "Doc" Pomus, Mort Shuman) – 2:25
  - rec. 12/2/62; UK singles chart: #2 (1 week)
4. "God Only Knows" (Tony Asher, Brian Wilson) – 2:52
  - rec. 1967 for his album Love, Andy
5. "Solitaire" (Phil Cody, Neil Sedaka) – 4:22
  - rec. 7/73; UK singles chart: #4
6. "Your Song" (Elton John, Bernie Taupin) – 3:27
  - rec. 1971 for his U.S. album Love Story
7. "The Way We Were" (Alan Bergman, Marilyn Bergman, Marvin Hamlisch) – 3:18
  - rec. 3/74 for his album The Way We Were
8. "Can't Take My Eyes off You" (Bob Crewe, Bob Gaudio) – 3:15
  - rec. 1967; UK singles chart: #5
9. "My Way" (Paul Anka, Claude François, Jacques Revaux) – 3:43
  - rec. 1969 for his album Happy Heart
10. "May Each Day" from The Andy Williams Show (Mort Green, George Wyle) – 2:54
  - rec. 1963; UK singles chart: #19 (1966)

== Bibliography ==
- Whitburn, Joel (2004), Joel Whitburn Presents Top R&B/Hip-Hop Singles, 1942-2004, Record Research Inc., ISBN 0-89820-160-8
- Whitburn, Joel (2007), Joel Whitburn Presents Billboard Top Adult Songs, 1961-2006, Record Research Inc., ISBN 0-89820-169-1
- Whitburn, Joel (2009), Joel Whitburn's Top Pop Singles, 1955-2008, Record Research Inc., ISBN 0-89820-180-2
