= Moon River: The Very Best of Andy Williams =

Moon River: The Very Best Of Andy Williams

Compilation album by Andy Williams
- Released: October 13, 2009
- Recorded: 1957–1972
- Genre: Traditional pop; vocal pop; standards; AM Pop; early pop/rock; soft rock; film music; soundtracks
- Length: 51:40
- Label: Columbia

Andy Williams chronology
I Don't Remember Ever Growing Up (2007)	Moon River: The Very Best Of Andy Williams (2009)	The Very Best of Andy Williams (2009)

Professional ratings
Review scores
Source	Rating
Allmusic	4/5 stars

Moon River: The Very Best of Andy Williams is a compilation album by American pop singer Andy Williams that was released on October 13, 2009. A note from Williams inside the CD booklet explains that the album "was put together to coincide with my memoir Moon River and Me, published by Viking/Penguin. It includes many of the songs that you made hits. I truly appreciate that, and I hope you enjoy the songs we selected for this CD." The collection covers a wide assortment of his material, including crossover hits ("Can't Get Used to Losing You" and "(Where Do I Begin) Love Story"), stabs at the youth market ("Butterfly" and "Music to Watch Girls By"), a pair of Mancini-Mercer Oscar winners ("Days of Wine and Roses" and "Moon River"), a Christmas classic ("It's the Most Wonderful Time of the Year"), and a eulogy to Robert F. Kennedy ("Battle Hymn of the Republic").

A 24-track compilation album released in conjunction with the book publication in the UK was entitled The Very Best of Andy Williams and had the same cover photo and design but had only nine of the 18 tracks on this album in common.

== Track listing ==
1. "Moon River" (Henry Mancini, Johnny Mercer) – 2:46
  - recorded on 1/4/62 for his album Moon River and Other Great Movie Themes
2. "(Where Do I Begin) Love Story" (Francis Lai, Carl Sigman) – 3:10
  - rec. 12/17/70 and released on 1/13/71; Billboard Hot 100: #9, Easy Listening: #1 (four weeks)
3. "Dear Heart" (Ray Evans, Jay Livingston, Henry Mancini) – 2:55
  - rec. 8/19/64, rel. 11/9/64; Billboard Hot 100: #24, Easy Listening: #2
4. "Butterfly" (Bernie Lowe, Kal Mann) – 2:21
  - rec. 1/23/57, rel. 1957; Billboard Hot 100: #1 (3 weeks)
5. "Can't Get Used to Losing You" (Jerome "Doc" Pomus, Mort Shuman) – 2:25
  - rec. 12/2/62, rel. 2/11/63; Billboard Hot 100: #2, Easy Listening: #1 (4 weeks)
6. "Born Free" (John Barry, Don Black) – 2:27
  - rec. 3/2/67 for his album Born Free
7. "Love Theme from Romeo and Juliet (A Time for Us)" (Larry Kusik, Nino Rota, Eddie Snyder) – 2:35
  - rec. 7/8/69 for his album Get Together with Andy Williams
8. "We've Only Just Begun" (Roger Nichols, Paul Williams) – 3:15
  - rec. 12/7/70 for his album Love Story
9. "Speak Softly Love (Love Theme from 'The Godfather')" (Larry Kusik, Nino Rota) – 3:05
  - rec. 2/18/72 & 2/24/72, rel. 3/3/72; Billboard Hot 100: #34, Easy Listening: #7
10. "Can't Help Falling in Love" (George Weiss, Hugo Peretti, Luigi Creatore) – 3:15
  - rec. 1/14/70, rel. 1/30/70; Billboard Hot 100: #88, Easy Listening: #28
11. "One Day of Your Life" (Howard Greenfield, Neil Sedaka) – 2:30
  - rec. 4/29/70, rel. 5/12/70; Billboard Hot 100: #77, Easy Listening: #2
12. "Days of Wine and Roses" (Henry Mancini, Johnny Mercer) – 2:48
  - rec. 1/16/63, rel. 2/11/63 Billboard Hot 100: #26, Easy Listening: #9
13. "The Village of St. Bernadette" (Eula Parker) – 3:22
  - rec. 11/19/59, rel. 1959; Billboard Hot 100: #7
14. "Music to Watch Girls By" (Sid Ramin, Tony Velona) – 2:38
  - rec. 2/21/67, rel. 3/2/67; Billboard Hot 100: #34, Easy Listening: #2
15. "Can't Take My Eyes Off You" (Bob Crewe, Bob Gaudio) – 3:15
  - rec. 9/18/67 for his album Love, Andy
16. "In the Arms of Love" (Ray Evans, Jay Livingston, Henry Mancini) – 2:56
  - rec. 6/23/66, rel. 7/8/66; Billboard Hot 100: #49, Easy Listening: #1 (2 weeks)
17. "Battle Hymn of the Republic" with the St. Charles Borromeo Choir (Julia Ward Howe, William Steffe) – 3:33
  - rec. 7/17/68, rel. 9/17/68; Billboard Hot 100: #33, Easy Listening: #11
18. "It's the Most Wonderful Time of the Year" (Edward Pola, George Wyle) – 2:32
  - rec. 9/12/63 for The Andy Williams Christmas Album

== Personnel ==
- Archie Bleyer – arranger/conductor ("Butterfly", "The Village of St. Bernadette")
- Artie Butler – arranger ("We've Only Just Begun")
- Al Capps – arranger ("Can't Help Falling in Love", "One Day of Your Life", "Speak Softly Love"), arranger/conductor ("Love Theme from 'Romeo and Juliet'")
- Nick DeCaro – arranger/producer ("Born Free", "Can't Take My Eyes Off You", "Music to Watch Girls By")
- Jerry Fuller – producer ("Love Theme from 'Romeo and Juliet'")
- Dick Glasser – producer ("Can't Help Falling in Love", "Love Story", "One Day of Your Life", "Speak Softly Love", "We've Only Just Begun")
- Dick Hazard – arranger ("Love Story")
- Eddie Karam – conductor ("Can't Take My Eyes Off You")
- Johnny Mandel – arranger ("It's the Most Wonderful Time of the Year")
- Robert Mersey – arranger/conductor/producer ("Can't Get Used to Losing You", "Days of Wine and Roses", "Dear Heart", "In the Arms of Love", "Moon River"), conductor/producer ("It's the Most Wonderful Time of the Year")
- The St. Charles Borromeo Choir – background vocals ("Battle Hymn of the Republic")
- Andy Williams – producer ("Battle Hymn of the Republic"); lead vocalist on all selections

== Bibliography ==
- Whitburn, Joel (2004), Joel Whitburn Presents Top R&B/Hip-Hop Singles, 1942–2004, Record Research Inc., ISBN 0-89820-160-8
- Whitburn, Joel (2007), Joel Whitburn Presents Billboard Top Adult Songs, 1961–2006, Record Research Inc., ISBN 0-89820-169-1
- Whitburn, Joel (2009), Joel Whitburn's Top Pop Singles, 1955–2008, Record Research Inc., ISBN 0-89820-180-2
- Wiley, Mason; Bona, Damien (1996), Inside Oscar: The Unofficial History of the Academy Awards, Ballantine Books, ISBN 0-345-40053-4
