= Andy Williams' Greatest Hits Vol. 2 (British album) =

Compilation album by Andy Williams
- Released: 1972
- Recorded: 1960; 1961–1972
- Genre: Traditional pop; vocal pop; standards; soft rock; film music; soundtracks
- Length: 35:36
- Label: CBS Records

Andy Williams chronology
Alone Again (Naturally) (1972)	Andy Williams' Greatest Hits Vol. 2 (1972)	Andy Williams' Greatest Hits Vol. 2 (U.S. version) (1973)

Andy Williams' Greatest Hits Vol. 2 is a compilation album by American pop singer Andy Williams that was released in the UK in 1972 by the CBS Records division of Columbia. The US album that shares this title was released in June 1973 by Columbia Records but had only three of its 11 tracks in common with those on this album and used a different cover photo and design.

This LP entered the UK album chart on December 16 of that year and reached number 23 over the course of 10 weeks.

One of the tracks on this album that was not on the U.S. version, "What's the Matter Girl", was released as a single in the UK but did not chart.

== Track listing ==
Side one

1. "Home Lovin' Man" (Roger Cook, Roger Greenaway, Tony Macaulay) – 3:10
  - recorded on 8/29/70; UK singles chart: #7
2. "It's So Easy" (Dor Lee, Dave Watkins) – 2:29
  - rec. 1/14/70 & 1/16/70; UK singles chart: #13
3. "(In the Summertime) You Don't Want My Love" (Roger Miller) – 2:16
  - rec. 10/17/60; non-charting UK single
4. "It's Impossible" (Armando Manzanero, Sid Wayne) – 2:47
  - rec. for his 1971 album Love Story
5. "Holly" (Craig Smith) – 2:25
  - rec. 8/23/67 & 9/18/67 for his 1967 album Love, Andy
6. "Speak Softly Love (Love Theme from 'The Godfather')" (Larry Kusik, Nino Rota) – 3:05
  - rec. 2/18/72 & 2/24/72; UK singles chart: #42

Side two

1. "(Where Do I Begin) Love Story" (Francis Lai, Carl Sigman) – 3:10
  - rec. 12/17/70; UK singles chart: #4
2. "What's the Matter Girl" (Tom Bahler) – 2:50
  - non-charting UK single
3. "God Only Knows" (Tony Asher, Brian Wilson) – 2:52
  - rec. for his 1967 album Love, Andy
4. "You've Got a Friend" (Carole King) – 4:44
  - rec. 6/10/71 for his 1971 album You've Got a Friend
5. "Danny Boy" (Frederick Edward Weatherly) – 2:56
  - rec. 9/24/61 for his 1962 album Danny Boy and Other Songs I Love to Sing
6. "Can't Help Falling in Love" (Luigi Creatore, Hugo Peretti, George David Weiss) – 3:15
  - rec. 1/14/70; UK singles chart: #3
