= Andy Williams' Greatest Hits Vol. 2 (American album) =

Compilation album by Andy Williams
- Released: June 1973
- Recorded: 1959, 1966−1972
- Genre: Traditional pop; vocal pop; standards; soft rock; film music; soundtracks
- Length: 35:36
- Label: Columbia

Andy Williams chronology
Andy Williams' Greatest Hits Vol. 2 (CBS) (1972)	Andy Williams' Greatest Hits Vol. 2 (1973)	Solitaire (1973)

Andy Williams' Greatest Hits Vol. 2 is a compilation album by American pop singer Andy Williams that was released in June 1973 by Columbia Records. This collection follows in the footsteps of its predecessor, Andy Williams' Greatest Hits, in that it is not limited to his biggest and most recent hit singles, although his final two US Top 40 entries ("(Where Do I Begin) Love Story" and "Speak Softly Love (Love Theme from 'The Godfather')") were included. It also has an album track not released as a single ("The Impossible Dream (The Quest)"), a couple of hits from his time with Cadence Records ("Lonely Street" and "The Village of St. Bernadette"), two other singles that could have been included on the first volume ("In the Arms of Love" and "Music to Watch Girls By"), and two Easy Listening chart entries that never made the Billboard Hot 100 ("Home Lovin' Man" and "Music from Across the Way").

The front and back cover design for the LP (by Anne Garner and Norman Seeff) shows Williams as he is bursting through a wall-sized collage of black-and-white images from various periods of his career, mainly involving the Williams Brothers and his variety program. While the front cover does not show the one foot that it would seem he is standing on, the back cover depicts the front cover setpiece as seen from the reverse angle behind him and is shot so that neither foot is touching the floor, as if to suggest that Williams is literally flying through the wall.

The British CBS album of the same name had only three of its 12 tracks in common with those on this album and used a different cover photo and design.

This U.S. release made its first appearance on the Billboard Top LP's & Tapes chart in the issue dated July 7, 1973, and remained there for five weeks, peaking at number 174. it also debuted on the Cashbox albums chart in the issue dated July 7, of that year, and remained on the chart for 7 weeks, peaking at number 137

This album was released on compact disc by Columbia Records in 1989. A Columbia 3-CD box set including this album along with the US versions of Andy Williams' Greatest Hits and his 1971 album Love Story was released on August 12, 1997.

== Reception ==
Professional ratings
Review scores
Source	Rating
Allmusic	3/5 stars
Billboard	Top Album Pick
The Encyclopedia of Popular Music	3/5 stars

Billboard magazine was pleasantly surprised. "Can time be slipping away so quickly that we now have a second volume of top tunes as interpreted with genuine skill by Andy? It seems like he was just singing these contemporary biggies only yesterday. But here they are in the all-familiar greatest hits package, rekindling memories of the artistry and beauty of such writers as Jimmy Webb, Sigman and Lai, Leon Russell, Henry Mancini, etc. These songs are from Andy's Dick Glasser-Nick DeCaro dates of the past few years, and they incorporate all the richness and large orchestral settings that people associate with the veteran singer."

== Track listing ==
=== Side one ===
1. "(Where Do I Begin) Love Story" (Francis Lai, Carl Sigman) – 3:10
  - recorded on 12/17/70 and released on 1/13/71; Billboard Hot 100: #9, Easy Listening: #1 (four weeks)
2. "MacArthur Park" (Jimmy Webb) – 5:03
  - rec. 1/4/71, rel. 6/30/72; Bubbling Under Hot 100 Singles: #102, Easy Listening: #26
3. "Music from Across the Way" (James Last, Sigman) – 3:45
  - rec. 6/10/71, rel. 12/14/71; Easy Listening: #30
4. "The Village of St. Bernadette" (Eula Parker) – 3:22
  - rec. 11/19/59, rel. Nov. 1959; Billboard Hot 100: #7
5. "Music to Watch Girls By" (Sid Ramin, Tony Velona) – 2:38
  - rec. 2/21/67, rel. 3/2/67; Billboard Hot 100: #34, Easy Listening: #2

=== Side two ===
1. "Speak Softly Love (Love Theme from 'The Godfather')" (Larry Kusik, Nino Rota) – 3:05
  - rec. 2/18/72 & 2/24/72, rel. 3/3/72; Billboard Hot 100: #34, Easy Listening: #7
2. "In the Arms of Love" (Ray Evans, Jay Livingston, Henry Mancini) – 2:56
  - rec. 6/23/66, rel. 7/8/66; Billboard Hot 100: #49, Easy Listening: #1 (2 weeks)
3. "The Impossible Dream (The Quest)" (Joe Darion, Mitch Leigh) – 2:39
  - rec. 1968 for his album Honey
4. "Lonely Street" (Carl Belew, Kenny Sowder, W.S. Stevenson) – 2:46
  - rec. 8/23/59, rel. Aug. 1959; Billboard Hot 100: #5, Hot R&B Sides: #20
5. "Home Lovin' Man" (Roger Cook, Roger Greenaway, Tony Macaulay) – 3:10
  - rec. 8/29/70, rel. 10/9/70; Easy Listening: #10 (1970), #27 (1972)
6. "A Song for You" (Leon Russell) – 3:07
  - rec. 7/7/71, rel. 7/22/71; Billboard Hot 100: #82, Easy Listening: #29

== Personnel ==
- Andy Williams - vocals
- Dick Glasser – producer ("Home Lovin' Man", "MacArthur Park", "Music from Across the Way", "A Song for You", "(Where Do I Begin?) Love Story", "Speak Softly Love (Love Theme from 'The Godfather')")
- Nick DeCaro - arranger/producer ("The Impossible Dream", "Music to Watch Girls By")
- Robert Mersey - arranger/conductor/producer ("In the Arms of Love")
- Archie Bleyer - arranger/conductor ("The Village of St. Bernadette"), conductor ("Lonely Street")
- Artie Butler - arranger ("Home Lovin' Man", "MacArthur Park")
- Al Capps - arranger ("Speak Softly Love (Love Theme from 'The Godfather')")
- Ernie Freeman - arranger ("Music from Across the Way", "A Song for You")
- Carlyle Hall - arranger ("Lonely Street")
- Dick Hazard - arranger ("(Where Do I Begin?) Love Story")
- Anne Garner - design
- Norman Seeff - design, photography

== Charts ==
=== Monthly charts ===
Monthly chart performance for Andy Williams' Greatest Hits Vol. 2
Chart (1977)	Peak position
Soviet International Albums (MK)	1

== Bibliography ==
- Whitburn, Joel (2004), Joel Whitburn Presents Top R&B/Hip-Hop Singles, 1942-2004, Record Research Inc., ISBN 0-89820-160-8
- Whitburn, Joel (2007), Joel Whitburn Presents Billboard Top Adult Songs, 1961-2006, Record Research Inc., ISBN 0-89820-169-1
- Whitburn, Joel (2009), Joel Whitburn's Top Pop Singles, 1955-2008, Record Research Inc., ISBN 0-89820-180-2
- Whitburn, Joel (2010), Joel Whitburn Presents Top Pop Albums, Seventh Edition, Record Research Inc., ISBN 0-89820-183-7
