= Solitaire (Andy Williams album) =

Studio album by Andy Williams
- Released: 1973
- Recorded: 1973
- Genre: Vocal pop; traditional pop; soft rock
- Length: 37:32
- Label: Columbia
- Producer: Richard Perry

Andy Williams chronology
Andy Williams' Greatest Hits Vol. 2 (1973)	Solitaire (1973)	The Way We Were (1974)

Solitaire is the thirty-first studio album by American pop singer Andy Williams, released in the fall of 1973 by Columbia Records and was an attempt to move away from his formulaic series of recent releases that relied heavily on songs that other artists had made popular.

The album debuted on Billboard magazine's Top LPs & Tapes chart in the issue dated November 17, 1973, and remained there for six weeks, peaking at number 185. it also debuted on the Cashbox albums chart in the issue dated November 3, 1973, and remained on the chart for 8 weeks, peaking at number 112. It entered the UK albums chart on December 22, 1973, and stayed there for 26 weeks, peaking at number three. On January 1, 1974, the newly formed British Phonographic Industry awarded the album with a Silver certification for sales of 60,000 units in the UK, and Gold certification from the BPI, for sales of 100,000 units, followed on January 1, 1975.

The first single from the album was the title track, which entered Billboard's list of the 40 most popular Easy Listening songs of the week in the U.S. in the issue dated October 6, 1973, and stayed on the chart for nine weeks, peaking at number 23. Although the song did not make the magazine's Hot 100, it did make the top five in the UK, where it entered the singles chart two months later, on December 8, and reached number four during an 18-week stay. Williams's rerecording of another song from the album, "Remember", as a duet with his daughter Noelle resulted in another Easy Listening chart entry as of the January 5, 1974, issue that made it to number 30 over the course of seven weeks. A third song, "Getting over You", entered the UK singles chart four months later, on May 18, and lasted there five weeks, eventually getting to number 35.

Solitaire was released on compact disc as one of two albums on one CD by Collectables Records on February 19, 2002, along with Williams's 1972 album, Alone Again (Naturally). Collectables included this CD in a box set entitled Classic Album Collection, Vol. 2, which contains 15 of his studio albums and two compilations, which was released on November 29, 2002. Solitaire was paired with the UK version of Alone Again (Naturally) (entitled The First Time Ever (I Saw Your Face)) as two albums on one disc by Sony Music Distribution in 2003.

== History ==
In 1966 Williams began to shift the focus of the material he recorded for his studio projects for Columbia Records away from traditional pop by recording the Beatles ballads "Michelle" and "Yesterday" for his album The Shadow of Your Smile. Covers of contemporary pop hits edged out his usual album fare of standards completely with the release of his 1968 album Honey and would dominate his LPs into the early 1970s.

Williams justified his latest decision to change his way of selecting music to record in an interview with Billboard in 1973. "'Middle of the Road music has changed drastically in the past two years,' says Williams. 'Easy Listening radio now plays predominantly the softer new rock records, not cover versions by MOR artists. My Columbia albums of hit covers have all made money, but I feel it's time for me to move along with the market.'" The magazine's editor Nat Freedland wrote, "The total sound of the Solitaire LP is not drastically different from other Williams albums; pretty ballads and lush string backgrounds are still much in evidence. The most obvious differences are a new concentration on strong rhythm instrument core and predominance of previously unrecorded songs."

The singer also took on a new approach to recording the album. "Williams, who generally has never recorded his vocals until the entire instrumental tracks were finished, here found himself singing along with the all-star rock session men putting down his basic rhythm tracks. 'I think everybody agrees now that you get better results when the artist sings along with the rhythm track sessions, even if you erase the vocal track afterwards,' says Williams. Ever the perfectionist, Andy wound up taping new vocals over the finished instrumental tracks. 'I just felt I could do it a bit better than I did at the live sessions,' he explains."

== Reception ==
Professional ratings
Review scores
Source	Rating
AllMusic	4/5 stars
The Encyclopedia of Popular Music	3/5 stars

William Ruhlmann of Allmusic took note of the new Williams sound. "One doesn't usually think of Andy Williams as someone ahead of the curve in popular music trends, but in 1973 he anticipated the comeback of Neil Sedaka by recording the songwriter's tune 'Solitaire' and using it as the title track and lead single of an album. Unfortunately, getting out in front of fashions is as commercially dicey as falling behind them, and while Sedaka himself went on to commercial resurgence in 1974 and "Solitaire" became a hit for the Carpenters in 1975, Williams did not benefit from his prescience (except in the UK, where his version made the Top Five)."

Ruhlmann also points out the logic behind the change in format. "With his record sales falling, Williams did not make a spring album in 1973, waiting until the fall to issue Solitaire, on which he not only cut his interpretations of recent pop hits ('You Are the Sunshine of My Life,' 'My Love') but also worked a little harder at song selection, resurrecting the Everly Brothers oldie 'Walk Right Back' and covering LP tracks by George Harrison ('That Is All') and Nicky Hopkins ('The Dreamer'). There was also an excellent movie song, 'Last Tango in Paris,' with lyrics by Dory Previn. In keeping with the tone of the title track, the arrangements and Williams's tone tended to emphasize melancholy, so that even 'You Are the Sunshine of My Life' sounded somewhat sad." Ruhlmann concludes, "Solitaire was a cut above most Andy Williams albums, but commercially that didn't matter. The singer had not found a way to reverse his career decline, and the album barely grazed the charts."

Billboard gave the album a positive reviews, saying "Solitare and "Make it Easy for Me" are examples of Andy's distinct vocal sound"

Record World wrote in their review stated "Andy sings with incomparable range and sensitivity on 'That Is All' and 'Remember'

== Track listing ==
This is the first Williams album that credits the musicians involved (with the exception of Lincoln Mayorga, credited on one track, God Only Knows, on the 1967 album Love, Andy), and they are listed on the back cover of the LP with each track as follows:

=== Side one ===
1. "Solitaire" (Phil Cody, Neil Sedaka) - 4:22
  - Jim Keltner - drums
  - Lincoln Mayorga - piano
  - Jim Ryan - acoustic guitar
  - Tom Hensley - harpsichord
  - Red Rhodes - pedal steel guitar
  - Lyle Ritz - bass
  - Kirby Johnson - string and woodwind arrangement
2. "Make It Easy for Me" (Peter Skellern) - 3:12
  - Nicky Hopkins - piano
  - Louie Shelton - acoustic guitar
  - Vini Poncia - acoustic guitar
  - Klaus Voormann - bass
  - Hal Blaine - drums
  - Bud Shank - alto sax solo
  - Tom Scott - arrangement
3. "You Are the Sunshine of My Life" (Stevie Wonder) - 3:11
  - Jim Keltner - drums
  - Joe Osborn - bass
  - Jimmy Calvert - electric guitar
  - Vini Poncia - acoustic guitar
  - John Morrell - acoustic guitar
  - Billy Fender - acoustic guitar
  - Tom Hensley - piano and choral arrangement
  - Tom Scott - string, horn and woodwind arrangement
  - Chuck Findley - flugelhorn solo
4. "Getting Over You" (Tony Hazzard) - 3:23
  - Klaus Voormann - bass
  - Jim Keltner - drums
  - Jimmy Calvert - electric guitar
  - Vini Poncia - acoustic guitar
  - Billy Fender - acoustic guitar
  - John Morrell - acoustic guitar
  - Tom Hensley - piano, string and horn arrangement
5. "Remember" (Harry Nilsson) - 4:03
  - Nicky Hopkins - piano
  - Richard Bennett - acoustic guitar
  - John Morrell - mandolin
  - Tom Hensley - harpsichord
  - Gene Page - string arrangement

=== Side two ===
1. "That Is All" (George Harrison) - 4:28
  - Jim Keltner - drums
  - Klaus Voormann - bass
  - Nicky Hopkins - piano
  - Tom Hensley - piano
  - Jimmy Calvert - electric guitar
  - Gene Page - string and vocal arrangement
2. "Walk Right Back" (Sonny Curtis) - 3:10
  - Klaus Voormann - bass
  - Jim Keltner - drums
  - Tom Hensley - electric piano
  - Vini Poncia - acoustic guitar
  - Jimmy Calvert - acoustic and electric guitar
  - John Morrell - acoustic guitar
  - Tom Scott - string and horn arrangement
3. "Last Tango in Paris" from Last Tango in Paris (Gato Barbieri, Dory Previn) - 2:38
  - Hal Blaine - drums
  - Lyle Ritz - bass
  - Mike Lang - electric piano
  - Ben Benay - acoustic guitar
  - Clark Gassman - piano
  - Mike Deasy - electric guitar
  - Gene Cipriano - bass clarinet solo
  - Kirby Johnson - string arrangement
4. "My Love" (Linda McCartney, Paul McCartney) - 4:00
  - Jim Keltner - drums
  - Joe Osborn - bass
  - Jimmy Calvert - electric guitar
  - Vini Poncia - acoustic guitar
  - John Morrell - acoustic guitar
  - Billy Fender - acoustic guitar
  - Tom Hensley - electric piano, string and woodwind arrangement
5. "The Dreamer" (Nicky Hopkins) - 5:08
  - Nicky Hopkins - piano
  - Klaus Voormann - bass
  - Jim Keltner - drums
  - Vini Poncia - acoustic guitar
  - John Morrell - acoustic guitar
  - Billy Fender - acoustic guitar
  - Lon Van Eaton - percussion
  - Derek Van Eaton - percussion
  - Tom Hensley - choral arrangement
  - Del Newman - string and horn arrangement

== Personnel ==
From the liner notes for the original album:

- Ben Benay - acoustic guitar
- Richard Bennett - acoustic guitar
- Hal Blaine - drums
- Jimmy Calvert - electric guitar, acoustic guitar
- Gene Cipriano - bass clarinet
- Mike Deasy - electric guitar
- Billy Fender - acoustic guitar
- Chuck Findley - flugelhorn
- Clark Gassman - piano
- Tom Hensley - arranger; harpsichord, piano, electric piano
- Nicky Hopkins - piano
- Kirby Johnson - arranger
- Jim Keltner - drums
- Michael Lang - electric piano
- Lincoln Mayorga - piano
- John Morrell - acoustic guitar, mandolin
- Del Newman - arranger
- Joe Osborn - bass
- Gene Page - arranger
- Richard Perry - producer
- Vini Poncia - acoustic guitar
- Red Rhodes - pedal steel guitar
- Lyle Ritz - bass
- Jim Ryan - acoustic guitar
- Bill Schnee - engineer
- Tom Scott - arranger
- Bud Shank - alto sax solo
- Louie Shelton - acoustic guitar
- Derek Van Eaton - percussion
- Lon Van Eaton - percussion
- Klaus Voormann - bass
- Andy Williams - vocals

== Charts ==
Chart (1973/74)	Peak position
Australia (Kent Music Report)	62
United Kingdom (Official Charts Company)	3
United States (Billboard 200)	185

== Bibliography ==
- Whitburn, Joel (2004), Joel Whitburn Presents Top R&B/Hip-Hop Singles, 1942-2004, Record Research Inc., ISBN 0-89820-160-8
- Whitburn, Joel (2007), Joel Whitburn Presents Billboard Top Adult Songs, 1961-2006, Record Research Inc., ISBN 978-0-89820-169-7
- Whitburn, Joel (2009), Joel Whitburn's Top Pop Singles, 1955-2008, Record Research Inc., ISBN 978-0-89820-180-2
- Whitburn, Joel (2010), Joel Whitburn Presents Top Pop Albums, Seventh Edition, Record Research Inc., ISBN 978-0-89820-183-3
