= Getting Over You =

Getting Over You or Gettin' Over You may refer to:

- "(I Think I'm Over) Getting Over You", a song by Tony Hazzard, later covered by multiple artists
- "Getting Over You", a song by Astrud Gilberto
- "Getting Over You", a song by Hank Williams Jr., 1974
- "Getting Over You", a song by Alabama from My Home's in Alabama
- "Getting Over You", a song by Deana Carter from The Story of My Life
- "Getting Over You", a song by Jagged Edge from J.E. Heartbreak 2, 2014
- "Getting Over You", a song by Metro Station from Savior, 2015
- "Gettin' Over You", a 2010 song by David Guetta and Chris Willis featuring Fergie and LMFAO
- "Gettin' Over You", a song by Mason Dixon, 1984
- "Gettin' Over You", a song by Stoneground from the album Stoneground 3, 1972
- "Gettin' Over You", a song by Grand Funk Railroad from Shinin' On
- "Gettin' Over You", a song by The Bam Balams, 1986
