= Andy Williams' Greatest Hits Vol. 2 =

Andy Williams' Greatest Hits Vol. 2 may refer to:

- Andy Williams' Greatest Hits Vol. 2 (American album), 1973
- Andy Williams' Greatest Hits Vol. 2 (British album), 1972
