= Angels in the Sky =

Angels in the Sky may refer to:

- "Angels in the Sky" (Dick Glasser song), 1954
- "Angels in the Sky" (Polo G song), 2024
