= Alone Again (Naturally) (album) =

Studio album by Andy Williams
- Released: 1972
- Recorded: August 29, 1970; 1972
- Genre: Traditional pop; soft rock
- Length: 37:11
- Label: Columbia
- Producer: Dick Glasser

Andy Williams chronology
Love Theme from "The Godfather" (1972)	Alone Again (Naturally) (1972)	Andy Williams' Greatest Hits Vol. 2 (CBS) (1972)

Alternate cover
- The First Time Ever (I Saw Your Face) (UK)

Alone Again (Naturally) is the thirtieth studio album by American pop singer Andy Williams, released in September 1972 by Columbia Records and mainly consisting of songs originated by other artists. For its release in the UK, the album was titled The First Time Ever (I Saw Your Face), and three of the songs were replaced with the 7-inch single tracks "Who Was It?" and "Marmalade, Molasses & Honey" and a recording that was not released on vinyl in the U.S., "If You're Gonna Break Another Heart".

The album made its first appearance on the Top LP's & Tapes chart in the issue dated September 30, 1972, and remained there for 18 weeks, peaking at number 86. it also debuted on the Cashbox albums chart in the issue dated October 21, 1972, and remained on the chart for in a total of 11 weeks, peaking at 80

The only song on the album ever released as a single by Williams was "Home Lovin' Man", which had already had its chart run on Billboard magazine's list of the 40 most popular Easy Listening songs of the week in the U.S. back in 1970, when it reached number 10. The song had also reached number seven on the UK singles chart by the end of that year. Coinciding with its first North American release on a Williams LP, the same recording entered the Easy Listening chart again in the November 4, 1972, issue of Billboard and made it to number 27 during its five weeks there.

Alone Again (Naturally) was released on compact disc as one of two albums on one CD by Collectables Records on February 19, 2002, along with Williams's 1973 Columbia album, Solitaire. Collectables included the CD in a box set entitled Classic Album Collection, Vol. 2, which contains 15 of his studio albums and two compilations, released on November 29, 2002. It was again paired with Solitaire on a single CD by Sony Music Distribution in 2003.

== Reception ==
Professional ratings
Review scores
Source	Rating
Allmusic	3/5 stars
Billboard	Spotlight Pick
The Encyclopedia of Popular Music	3/5 stars

William Ruhlmann of AllMusic says the album proves Williams "surveyed the hit parade and mined it for his own easy listening versions of hits by America, Roberta Flack, Neil Diamond, and the Beatles".

In their capsule review for retailers, Billboard magazine wrote, "Chalk up another important chart item for Williams as he takes on some strong hits of today and adds his own fine touches to them." They singled out a few tracks in particular. “Along with the title tune, Williams delivers exceptional readings of 'Where Is the Love', 'Song Sung Blue', 'Amazing Grace' and 'I Need You'. His treatment of 'The Long and Winding Road' is also a gem."

Cashbox wrote "The combination of the singer and the song has made Andy Williams one of the most successful performers to date".

Record Mirror praised Williams for "His outstanding work-out for Day By Day.

== Track listing ==
=== North American release ===
Side one

1. "Pieces of April" (Dave Loggins) – 3:36
2. "Day by Day" from Godspell (Stephen Schwartz) – 3:11
3. "Where Is the Love" (Ralph MacDonald, William Salter) – 2:34
4. "If I Could Go Back" from Lost Horizon (1973) (Burt Bacharach, Hal David) – 4:28
5. "I Need You" (Gerry Beckley) – 2:58

Side two

1. "Alone Again (Naturally)" (Gilbert O'Sullivan) – 4:04
2. "The First Time Ever (I Saw Your Face)" (Ewan MacColl) – 3:19
3. "Song Sung Blue" (Neil Diamond) – 3:05
4. "Home Lovin' Man" (Roger Cook, Roger Greenaway, Tony Macaulay) – 3:10
5. "The Long and Winding Road" (John Lennon, Paul McCartney) – 3:18
6. "Amazing Grace" (John Newton) – 3:27

=== UK release ===
Side one

1. "The First Time Ever (I Saw Your Face)" (MacColl) – 3:19
2. "Pieces of April" (Loggins) – 3:36
3. "Day by Day" (Schwartz) – 3:11
4. "Where Is the Love" (MacDonald, Salter) – 2:34
5. "If I Could Go Back" (Bacharach, David) – 4:28

Side two

1. "I Need You" (Beckley) – 2:58
2. "Alone Again (Naturally)" (O'Sullivan) – 4:04
3. "Song Sung Blue" (Diamond) – 3:05
4. "Who Was It?" (O'Sullivan) – 2:50
5. "Marmalade, Molasses & Honey" from The Life and Times of Judge Roy Bean (Alan and Marilyn Bergman, Maurice Jarre) – 3:40
6. "If You're Gonna Break Another Heart" (Albert Hammond, Mike Hazlewood) – 2:29

== Recording dates ==
- August 29, 1970 – "Home Lovin' Man"
- June 12, 1972 – "I Need You", "The First Time Ever I Saw Your Face"
- June 13, 1972 – "Alone Again (Naturally)", "The Long and Winding Road","Amazing Grace"
- July 18, 1972 – "Pieces of April", "Day by Day", "Where Is the Love, "If I Could Go Back"
- 1972 – "Song Sung Blue"
- September 16, 1972 – "Who Was It?"

== Personnel ==
From the liner notes for the original album:

- Andy Williams - vocals
- Dick Glasser - producer
- Al Capps - arranger/conductor (except as noted)
- Artie Butler - arranger/conductor ("Home Lovin' Man")
- Eric Prestidge - remix engineer
- Mike Ross-Trevor - recording engineer in London
- Rafael O. Valentin - recording engineer
- Tom Bert - back cover photo
- Keats Tyler - front cover photo

== Charts ==
Chart (1972–1973)	Peak position
Australia (Kent Music Report)	68
US Billboard 200	86
US Cashbox Top 100	80

== Bibliography ==
- O'Neil, Thomas (1999). The Grammys. Perigree Books. ISBN 0-399-52477-0.
- Whitburn, Joel (2004). Joel Whitburn Presents Top R&B/Hip-Hop Singles, 1942-2004. Record Research Inc. ISBN 0-89820-160-8.
- Whitburn, Joel (2007). Joel Whitburn Presents Billboard Top Adult Songs, 1961-2006. Record Research Inc. ISBN 978-0-89820-169-7.
- Whitburn, Joel (2009). Joel Whitburn's Top Pop Singles, 1955-2008. Record Research Inc. ISBN 978-0898201802.
- Whitburn, Joel (2010). Joel Whitburn Presents Top Pop Albums, Seventh Edition. Record Research Inc. ISBN 978-0-89820-183-3.
- Wiley, Mason; Bona, Damien (1996). Inside Oscar: The Unofficial History of the Academy Awards. Ballantine Books. ISBN 0345400534.
