= Andy Williams' Greatest Hits =

- Cover art by Bernie Fuchs

Compilation album by Andy Williams
- Released: 1970
- Recorded: 1958; 1962−1969
- Genre: Early pop/rock; traditional pop; vocal pop; standards; soft rock; film music; soundtracks
- Length: 30:04
- Label: Columbia; KCS 9979

Andy Williams chronology
Get Together with Andy Williams (1969)	Andy Williams' Greatest Hits (1970)	Raindrops Keep Fallin' on My Head (1970)

Alternate cover
- UK cover

Professional ratings
Review scores
Source	Rating
Allmusic	4/5 stars
Billboard	Spotlight Pick
The Encyclopedia of Popular Music	3/5 stars

Andy Williams' Greatest Hits is a compilation album by American pop singer Andy Williams that was released in early 1970 by Columbia Records. It was not, however, as its title might suggest, strictly a hit singles compilation, although some of his biggest songs since joining Columbia (such as the easy listening number ones "Can't Get Used to Losing You" and "Happy Heart") were included. A couple of selections ("Born Free" and "More") were never released as singles by Williams, and his signature song, "Moon River", was released in the 7-inch single format but only for jukeboxes. His six Cadence singles that made the Top 10 on Billboard magazine's Hot 100 are passed over for the inclusion of his number 11 hit from that label, "The Hawaiian Wedding Song", and 17 of his Columbia recordings that made the Hot 100 up until 1970 are left out here in favor of "Charade", which spent its one week on the chart at number 100.

The most noticeable change that was made for the UK release of the album was the replacement of the cover sketch with the photo of Williams found in the gatefold section of the album jacket of the US release. The other major difference was that Williams's recording of "Can't Take My Eyes off You" was added to the track list for the UK version.

The album made its first appearance on the Billboard Top LPs chart in the issue dated March 7, 1970, and remained there for 20 weeks, peaking at number 42. it also debuted on the Cashbox albums chart in the issue dated February 21, of that year, and remained on the chart for 14 weeks, peaking at number 30 In the UK it debuted on the album chart on April 11 of that year in the number two position out of 55 albums listed that week and eventually had five appearances at number one there out of a total of 108 weeks on the chart. The Recording Industry Association of America awarded the album Gold certification on September 13, 1971.

The US version of the album was released on compact disc for the first time by Columbia Records in 1988. A Columbia three-CD box set including this version of the album along with the US versions of Andy Williams' Greatest Hits Vol. 2 and his 1971 album Love Story was released on August 12, 1997.

== Reception ==
Robert Taylor of Allmusic's notes "This a fine representation of some of Andy Williams' most beloved hits and yet another of his gold recordings"

In their capsule review, Billboard magazine wrote, "Superb program and performances."

== Track listing ==
=== Side one ===
1. "Born Free" from Born Free (Don Black, John Barry) – 2:27
  - Nick DeCaro - arranger, producer
2. "Days of Wine and Roses" from Days of Wine and Roses (Johnny Mercer, Henry Mancini) – 2:48
  - Robert Mersey - arranger, conductor, producer
3. "Moon River" from Breakfast at Tiffany's (Mercer, Mancini) – 2:46
  - Robert Mersey - arranger, conductor, producer
4. "Dear Heart" from Dear Heart (Jay Livingston, Ray Evans, Mancini) – 2:55
  - Robert Mersey - arranger, conductor, producer
5. "The Hawaiian Wedding Song" (Al Hoffman, Dick Manning, Charles E. King) – 2:29
  - Archie Bleyer - conductor
  - Carlyle Hall - arranger
6. "More" from Mondo Cane (Riz Ortolani, Nino Oliviero, Norman Newell) – 2:32
  - Robert Mersey - conductor, producer
  - Dave Grusin - arranger

=== Side two ===
1. "Almost There" from I'd Rather Be Rich (Jerry Keller, Gloria Shayne) – 2:59
  - Robert Mersey - arranger, conductor, producer
2. "Charade" from Charade (Mercer, Mancini) – 2:35
  - Robert Mersey - arranger, conductor, producer
3. "Happy Heart" (Jackie Rae, James Last) – 3:15
  - Jerry Fuller - producer
  - Al Capps - arranger
4. "Can't Get Used to Losing You" (Jerome "Doc" Pomus, Mort Shuman) – 2:25
  - Robert Mersey - arranger, conductor, producer
5. "May Each Day" from The Andy Williams Show (Mort Green, George Wyle) – 2:54
  - Robert Mersey - arranger, conductor, producer

For the UK version of this collection, "Can't Take My Eyes off You" (from the 1967 album Love, Andy) was inserted between "Almost There" and "Charade", but the track listing for the UK version was otherwise identical to that of the North American release.

== Recording dates ==
- November 3, 1958 - "Hawaiian Wedding Song"
- January 4, 1962 - "Moon River"
- December 2, 1962 - "Can't Get Used to Losing You"
- January 16, 1963 - "Days of Wine and Roses", "May Each Day"
- November 1, 1963 - "Charade"
- February 28, 1964 - "Almost There"
- August 19, 1964 - "Dear Heart"
- September 18, 1967 - "Can't Take My Eyes off You"
- March 8, 1969 - "Happy Heart"

== Chart positions ==
Chart (1970)	Peak position
US Billboard Top LP's	42
UK Albums Chart	1

== Personnel ==
- Archie Bleyer - conductor ("Hawaiian Wedding Song")
- Al Capps - arranger ("Happy Heart")
- Nick DeCaro - arranger/producer ("Born Free", "Can't Take My Eyes off You")
- Jerry Fuller - producer ("Happy Heart")
- Dave Grusin - arranger ("More")
- Eddie Karam - conductor ("Can't Take My Eyes off You")
- Robert Mersey - arranger, conductor, producer (see track listing)
- Andy Williams - vocalist

== Bibliography ==
- Whitburn, Joel (2009), Joel Whitburn's Top Pop Singles, 1955-2008, Record Research Inc., ISBN 0-89820-180-2
- Whitburn, Joel (2010), Joel Whitburn Presents Top Pop Albums, Seventh Edition, Record Research Inc., ISBN 0-89820-183-7
