= The Andy Williams Show (album) =

Studio album by Andy Williams
- Released: 1970
- Recorded: March 21, 1968; April 8, 1970; July 13, 1970; August 31, 1970
- Genres: Traditional pop; vocal pop; soft rock
- Length: 31:50
- Label: Columbia
- Producers: Mike Post; Nick DeCaro

Andy Williams chronology
Raindrops Keep Fallin' on My Head (1970)	The Andy Williams Show (1970)	Love Story (1971)

The Andy Williams Show is the twenty-sixth studio album by American pop singer Andy Williams, released in the fall of 1970 by Columbia Records. In his review on AllMusic, William Ruhlmann writes that "The Andy Williams Show LP was not a soundtrack recording from the TV series, and it was not really a live album, although it gets categorized as such. What appears to be the case is that Columbia Records took a group of Williams' studio recordings, most of them made during the summer of 1970 and consisting of his versions of recent soft rock hits, and added a lot of canned applause along with some of the kind of musical interludes used to usher numbers on and off on the show, including bits of its "Moon River" theme music at the start and the finish."

The album made its first appearance on the Top LP's chart in the issue of Billboard magazine dated November 14, 1970, and remained on the album chart for 17 weeks, peaking at number 81. It entered the UK album chart the following month, on December 5, and reached number 10 over the course of six weeks. it also debuted on the Cashbox albums chart in the issue dated November 28, of that year, and remained on the chart for in a total of 7 weeks, peaking at 82

The Andy Williams Show was released on compact disc as one of two albums on one CD by Collectables Records on February 5, 2002, along with Williams's 1971 Columbia album, You've Got a Friend. Collectables included the CD in a box set entitled Classic Album Collection, Vol. 2, which contains 15 of his studio albums and two compilations, in 2002.

== Reception ==
Professional ratings
Review scores
Source	Rating
Allmusic	2.5/5 stars
Billboard	Spotlight Pick
The Encyclopedia of Popular Music	3/5 stars

Billboard noted that the album "has the added bonus of a handsomely produced color booklet, mainly photographs, featuring the artist and show guests. The album is paced nicely."

== Track listing ==
=== Side one ===
1. Opening – 0:14
2. "(They Long to Be) Close to You" (Burt Bacharach, Hal David) – 3:00
3. Musical Bridge 1 – 0:12
4. "Joanne" (Michael Nesmith) – 2:50
5. "Never My Love" (Dick Addrisi, Don Addrisi) – 2:50
6. Musical Bridge 2 – 0:13
7. "Make It with You" (David Gates) – 3:14
8. "El Condor Pasa (If I Could)" (Jorge Milchberg, Daniel Alomía Robles, Paul Simon) – 3:25
9. Station Break – 0:20

=== Side two ===
1. "Snowbird" (Gene MacLellan) – 2:06
2. Musical Bridge 3 – 0:08
3. "Leaving on a Jet Plane" (John Denver) – 3:42
4. "What Are You Doing the Rest of Your Life?" from The Happy Ending (Alan Bergman, Marilyn Bergman, Michel Legrand) – 2:45
5. Musical Bridge 4 – 0:11
6. "Spanish Harlem" (Jerry Leiber, Phil Spector) – 3:09
7. "Hello, Young Lovers" from The King and I (Oscar Hammerstein II, Richard Rodgers) – 2:48
8. Closing – 0:51

== Recording dates ==
From the liner notes for the 2002 CD:

- March 21, 1968 - "Spanish Harlem", "Hello, Young Lovers"
- April 8, 1970 - "Leaving on a Jet Plane"
- July 13, 1970 - "(They Long to Be) Close to You", "Make It with You", "What Are You Doing the Rest of Your Life?"
- August 31, 1970 - "Joanne", "El Condor Pasa (If I Could)", "Snowbird"
- unknown recording date - "Never My Love"

== Song information ==
The Carpenters recording of "(They Long to Be) Close to You" spent six weeks at number one on Billboard magazine's Easy Listening chart and four weeks in the top spot on the Billboard Hot 100, reached number six on the UK singles chart, received Gold certification from the Recording Industry Association of America, and earned The Carpenters a Grammy Award in the category of Best Contemporary Vocal Performance by a Duo, Group or Chorus. "Joanne" by Michael Nesmith & The First National Band reached number 21 pop and number six Easy Listening. "Never My Love" earned Gold certification for The Association, who took the song to number two on the Hot 100.

Bread's "Make It with You" enjoyed a week at number one on the pop chart, reached number four Easy Listening and number five in the UK, and was awarded Gold certification. Simon & Garfunkel got as high as number 18 on the Billboard Hot 100 with "El Condor Pasa (If I Could)" and took the song to number six Easy Listening. "Snowbird" by Anne Murray spent six weeks at number one Easy Listening and made it to number eight pop, number 10 Country, and number 23 UK before becoming her first Gold record.

"Leaving on a Jet Plane" is another Gold record that Williams covers here. Peter, Paul and Mary's recording of the song enjoyed a week at number one on the Billboard Hot 100 and three weeks in the top spot on the Easy Listening chart. "What Are You Doing the Rest of Your Life?" comes from the 1969 film The Happy Ending, where it was sung by Michael Dees, and Jaye P. Morgan took the song to number 40 Easy Listening. Ben E. King peaked at number 10 on the Hot 100 and number 15 R&B with "Spanish Harlem". And "Hello, Young Lovers" was first performed by Gertrude Lawrence in the original Broadway production of The King and I in 1951. Perry Como had a number 27 hit with it that same year, and Williams first recorded the song for his 1958 album Andy Williams Sings Rodgers and Hammerstein.

== Personnel ==
From the liner notes for the original album:

- Andy Williams - vocals
- Mike Post - producer (except as noted), arranger ("Joanne", "Never My Love", "El Condor Pasa (If I Could)", "Leaving on a Jet Plane", "Hello Young Lovers")
- Nick DeCaro - producer ("Spanish Harlem"), arranger ("(They Long to Be) Close to You", "Make It with You", "Spanish Harlem")
- Dick Hazard - arranger ("What Are You Doing the Rest of Your Life?")
- Pete Carpenter - arranger ("Snowbird")
- Rafael O. Valentin - engineer
- Earl Brown - choir director

== Bibliography ==
- O'Neil, Thomas (1999), The Grammys, Perigree Books, ISBN 0-399-52477-0
- Whitburn, Joel (1986), Joel Whitburn's Pop Memories, 1890-1954, Record Research Inc., ISBN 0-89820-083-0
- Whitburn, Joel (1993), Joel Whitburn's Top Adult Contemporary, 1961-1993, Record Research Inc., ISBN 0-89820-099-7
- Whitburn, Joel (1999), Joel Whitburn's Top Pop Singles, 1955-1999, Record Research Inc., ISBN 0-89820-140-3
- Whitburn, Joel (2002), Joel Whitburn's Top Country Singles, 1944-2001, Record Research Inc., ISBN 0-89820-151-9
- Whitburn, Joel (2004), Joel Whitburn Presents Top R&B/Hip-Hop Singles, 1942-2004, Record Research Inc., ISBN 0-89820-160-8
- Whitburn, Joel (2010), Joel Whitburn Presents Top Pop Albums, Seventh Edition, Record Research Inc., ISBN 978-0-89820-183-3
