= Allan Reuss =

American jazz guitarist

- Born: June 15, 1915; New York City, US
- Died: June 4, 1988 (aged 72) North Hollywood, California, US
- Genres: Jazz, swing
- Occupation: Musician
- Instrument: Guitar

Allan Reuss (June 15, 1915 – June 4, 1988) was an American jazz guitarist.

== Biography ==
Reuss was born New York City, he began playing professionally as a banjoist at age 12. He learned guitar from George Van Eps. In the middle of the 1930s, Reuss began playing in Benny Goodman's orchestra, playing with him on and off until 1943. He played with Paul Whiteman and then with Jack Teagarden from 1939 to 1940; following this he was with Jimmy Dorsey (1941–42) and Harry James (1942–43). Alongside his spots in orchestras, he was a frequent session musician for New York recordings. In 1945 he moved to Los Angeles, where he continued as a studio guitarist, played with Arnold Ross, and led a trio. Among his credits are work with Mildred Bailey, rhythm guitar for the Song "Grim grinning Ghosts" in Disneys Haunted Mansion, Bunny Berigan, Benny Carter, Billie Holiday, Lionel Hampton, Coleman Hawkins, Teddy Wilson and Charlie Ventura. He appeared on the Big Band standards "Sing, Sing, Sing" by Benny Goodman and "Moonlight Serenade" by Glenn Miller.

== Compositions ==
His compositions included "Pickin' For Patsy" with Jack Teagarden, "Shufflin' at the Hollywood" with Lionel Hampton, and "More and More" with Rainey Robinson and Tommy Karen.

== Bibliography ==
- Allan, Reuss; Robinson, Rainey; Karen, Tommye (1967). More and More (Sheet Music). Sunbeam Music Corporation. ASIN B002QSLY2W.
