= (I Think I'm Over) Getting Over You =

Song written by Tony Hazzard

Single by Peter Noone
- B-side: "All Sing Together"
- Released: February 1974
- Genre: Adult Contemporary
- Length: 3:05
- Label: Philips
- Songwriter: Tony Hazzard
- Producer: Dick Glasser

Peter Noone singles chronology
"Shoo Be Doo Ah" (1972)	"(I Think I'm Over) Getting Over You" (1974)	"Meet Me On The Corner Down At Joe's Cafe" (1974)

"Getting Over You"

Single by Andy Williams

from the album Solitaire
- A-side: "Remember"
- Released: May 1974
- Genre: Vocal
- Length: 3:25
- Label: Columbia Records
- Songwriter: Tony Hazzard
- Producer: Richard Perry

Andy Williams singles chronology
"Solitaire" (1973)	"Getting Over You" (1974)	"Love's Theme" (1974)

"Getting Over You" is a song written by Tony Hazzard in 1973, and recorded by various artists, including the writer. Hazzard's original is from his LP 'Was That Alright Then?' and was included on his double album 'Go North - The Bronze Anthology'.

== Peter Noone cover ==
A version by Herman's Hermits lead singer Peter Noone charted in Canada, a track from his 1973 eponymous debut LP. The song reached #63 on the Adult Contemporary chart.

== Andy Williams version ==
Andy Williams recorded the most successful version of the song, entitled simply as "Getting Over You". It is a track from his Solitaire album.

"Getting Over You" reached #35 in the UK during the late spring of 1974. The single was released from Williams' Solitaire LP. In the U.S., the song was featured as the B-side of "Remember," which was a hit for Williams on the Easy Listening chart.

=== Chart history ===
Peter Noone

Chart (1974)	Peak position
Canada RPM Adult Contemporary	63

Andy Williams

Chart (1974)	Peak position
UK	35

== Other versions ==
Caterina Caselli covered the song in Italian in 1974 from her Primavera album.
