= Andy (1976 album) =

Studio album by Andy Williams
- Released: 1976
- Recorded: March 31, 1976; May 18, 1976; May 19, 1976; May 28, 1976; June 21, 1976; July 16, 1976
- Genres: Traditional pop; vocal pop
- Length: 35:44
- Label: Columbia
- Producer: Larry Brown

Andy Williams chronology
The Other Side of Me (1975)	Andy (1976)	Reflections (1977)

Professional ratings
Review scores
Source	Rating
Allmusic	2.5/5 stars
Billboard	Recommended LP

Andy is the thirty-sixth studio album by American pop singer Andy Williams, released in the fall of 1976 by Columbia Records. Williams is not as focused on covering pop hits and standards on this album and instead relies mainly on original or lesser-known songs. In the liner notes for the album's 2002 CD release, writer Richard M. Erickson explains that the album "was recorded at six different studios to accommodate Andy's touring schedule. One recording session was at a portable studio set up at a Marriott hotel."

Andy was released on compact disc by Collectables Records in 2002 with eight bonus tracks that were taken from four of Williams's Columbia singles released between 1974 and 1979. Collectables included this CD in a box set entitled Classic Album Collection, Vol. 2, which contains 15 of his studio albums and two compilations and was released on November 29, 2002.

Two of those four bonus A-sides originated as instrumental tracks from film scores and had lyrics added that were never heard in the film or on the corresponding soundtrack album: "Love Said Goodbye" is subtitled "Love Theme from The Godfather Part II" and "Are You in There?" is also labeled as "Main Theme from King Kong".

"Love Said Goodbye" was also one of two of the bonus tracks that made the Billboard charts, starting a seven-week Easy Listening run in the magazine's January 11, 1975, issue that took the song to number 24. The other, "Tell It Like It Is", entered that same chart in the December 20, 1975, issue and reached number 17 over the course of 10 weeks, and its debut on the Billboard Hot 100 came four weeks later, in the issue for January 17, 1976, and led to a peak at number 72 during a six-week stay. Williams's cover of the song marked his last of 44 appearances on the Easy Listening chart, dating back to its inception in 1961, and his last of 53 hits on the Hot 100, the first being "Walk Hand in Hand" in 1956.

== Track listing ==
=== Side one ===
1. "Yellow Beach Umbrella" (Craig Doerge, Judy Henske) – 4:02
2. "Sailin'" (Kim Carnes, David Ellingson) – 3:28
3. "Thank You, Baby" (Bruce Johnston) – 3:18
4. "Since I Fell for You" (Buddy Johnson) – 2:54
5. "My Lonely Room" (Peter Skellern) – 4:06

=== Side two ===
1. "Put Your Blues to Bed" (Harry Garfield, Jay Graydon) – 4:00
2. "If You Ever Believed" (Elizabeth Dasheff, Andrew Goldmark) – 3:27
3. "Groovin'" (Eddie Brigati, Felix Cavaliere) – 3:54
4. "Tryin' to Forget I Loved You" (Nancy Ames, Danny Ward) – 3:37
5. "The Poem" (Paulinho Nogueira, Byron Walls) – 3:03

=== CD Bonus Tracks ===
1. "Love Said Goodbye (Love Theme from The Godfather Part II)" (Larry Kusic, Nino Rota) – 2:54
2. "One More Time" (David Paich) – 3:32
3. "Tell It Like It Is" (George Davis, Lee Diamond) – 2:42
4. "Goin' Through the Motions" (Tom Bahler) – 3:17
5. ^{[A]}"Are You in There? (Main Theme from King Kong)" (John Barry, David Pomeranz) – 3:49
6. "Are You in There? (Disco Version)" (Barry, Pomeranz) – 4:59*
7. "Jason" (Deborah Kay Hupp, Bob Morrison) – 3:14
8. "I'll Never Love Anyone Anymore" (Laurie Andrew, Cedric Chiles) – 3:04
- Titled "Are You There?" on the Collectables CD packaging.

== Recording dates ==
From the liner notes for the 2002 CD:

=== Original LP ===
- March 31, 1976 – "If You Ever Believed", "Since I Fell for You"
- May 18, 1976 – "My Lonely Room", "Yellow Beach Umbrella"
- May 19, 1976 – "The Poem"
- May 28, 1976 – "Put Your Blues to Bed"
- June 21, 1976 – "Sailin'", "Thank You, Baby"
- July 16, 1976 – "Groovin'", "Tryin' to Forget I Loved You"

=== CD bonus tracks ===
- December 6, 1974 – "Love Said Goodbye", "One More Time"
- August 21, 1975 – "Goin' Through the Motions"
- September 30, 1975 – October 1, 1975 – "Tell It Like It Is"
- December 1, 1976 – "Are You in There?", "Are You in There? (Disco Version)"
- September 27, 1979 – "I'll Never Love Anyone Anymore"
- October 8, 1979 – "Jason"

== Personnel ==
From the liner notes for the original album:

- Ben Benay – guitar
- Hal Blaine – drums
- Larry Brown – percussion
- Larry Carlton – guitar
- Kim Carnes – background vocals
- Vince Charles – percussion
- Buddy Collette – reeds & woodwinds
- James Decker – French horn
- Craig Doerge – keyboards
- Gene Estes – percussion
- Barry Fasman – keyboards
- Jack Feierman – trumpet
- Jay Graydon – guitar
- Terry Harrington – reeds & woodwinds
- Tom Hensley – keyboards
- Dick Hyde – trombone
- The Richard Kaufman Strings – strings
- Jim Keltner – drums
- Gayle Levant – harp
- Arthur Maobe – French horn
- Bill Mays – keyboards
- Mike Melvoin – keyboards
- Tommy Morgan – harmonica
- Dick Parisi – French horn
- David Pomeranz – background vocals ("If You Ever Believed", "Yellow Beach Umbrella")
- Reiny Press – bass
- The Sid Sharpe Strings – strings
- Leland Sklar – bass
- Dalton Smith – trumpet
- Ron Tutt – drums
- Don Waldrop – trombone
- Gary Walters – bass
- Julia Waters Tillman – background vocals
- Maxine Waters Willard – background vocals

=== Production ===
- Larry Brown – producer (except as noted), engineer, mixer, background vocal arranger
- Barry Fasman – arranger (except as noted), conductor
- David Paich – producer ("Love Said Goodbye")
- Marty Paich – arranger/producer ("Love Said Goodbye")
- Kim Carnes – background vocal arranger
- David Pomeranz – vocal arrangements ("If You Ever Believed", "Yellow Beach Umbrella")
- Joe Bellamy – assistant engineer
- Fred Ehrhardt – assistant engineer
- Bob Folgo – assistant engineer
- Bill Gazecki – assistant engineer
- Rick Hart – assistant engineer
- Lou Mazzuchelli – assistant engineer
- Jim Quarles – assistant engineer
- Keats Tyler – photography
- Ken Anderson – design

== Bibliography ==
- Whitburn, Joel (2002), Joel Whitburn's Top Country Singles, 1944–2001, Record Research Inc., ISBN 0-89820-151-9
- Whitburn, Joel (2004), Joel Whitburn Presents Top R&B/Hip-Hop Singles, 1942–2004, Record Research Inc., ISBN 0-89820-160-8
- Whitburn, Joel (2007), Joel Whitburn Presents Billboard Top Adult Songs, 1961–2006, Record Research Inc., ISBN 978-0-89820-169-7
- Whitburn, Joel (2009), Joel Whitburn's Top Pop Singles, 1955–2008, Record Research Inc., ISBN 978-0-89820-180-2
