= Love Theme from "The Godfather" (album) =

Studio album by Andy Williams
- Released: March 21, 1972
- Recorded: January 4, 1971; April 22, 1971; January 19, 1972; February 1, 1972; February 18, 1972
- Genres: Traditional pop; Vocal pop; soft rock
- Length: 37:42
- Label: Columbia
- Producer: Dick Glasser

Andy Williams chronology
The Impossible Dream (1971)	Love Theme from "The Godfather" (1972)	Alone Again (Naturally) (1972)

Singles from Love Theme from "The Godfather"
- 1. "Speak Softly, Love" Released: April 1972

Love Theme from "The Godfather" is the twenty-ninth studio album by American pop singer Andy Williams, released on March 21, 1972, by Columbia Records. The two new songs on what was otherwise another LP of covers of hits by other artists were the title track and "Music from Across the Way", which came from the songwriters behind his recent hits "Happy Heart" (composer James Last) and "(Where Do I Begin) Love Story" (lyricist Carl Sigman).

The album made its first appearance on Billboard magazine's Top LP's & Tapes chart in the issue dated April 8, 1972, and remained on the album chart for 26 weeks, peaking at number 29. It entered the UK album chart three months later, on July 29, and reached number 11 over the course of 16 weeks. it also debuted on the Cashbox albums chart in the issue dated April 15, of that year, and remained on the chart for 23 weeks, peaking at number 18. One month later, on August 29, it received Gold certification from the Recording Industry Association of America.

The first song on the album to be released as a single was "Music from Across the Way", which entered Billboard's list of the 40 most popular Easy Listening songs of the week in the US in the issue dated January 29, 1972, and stayed on the chart for four weeks, eventually peaking at number 30. The album's title song (subtitled "Speak Softly Love") entered that same chart three months later, on April 8, for its first of 12 weeks, during which time it reached number seven. It also entered the Billboard Hot 100 in the April 8 issue and spent 11 weeks there, where it made it to number 34. on the Cashbox singles it reached number 24 during its ten-week stay. The song debuted on the UK singles chart four months later, on August 5, and got as high as number 42 over a nine-week period. The next single, "MacArthur Park", "bubbled under" the Hot 100 for four weeks that began in the August 5, 1972, issue and reached number 102. It also debuted on the Easy Listening chart in that same issue and made it to number 26 there over the course of five weeks.

Love Theme from "The Godfather" was released on compact disc as one of two albums on one CD by Collectables Records on January 22, 2002, along with Williams's 1974 Columbia album, The Way We Were. Love Theme from "The Godfather" was included in a box set entitled Classic Album Collection, Vol. 2, which contains 15 of his studio albums and two compilations and was released on November 29, 2002.

== Reception ==
Professional ratings
Review scores
Source	Rating
AllMusic	4/5 stars
Billboard	Spotlight Pick
The Encyclopedia of Popular Music	3/5 stars

Billboard magazine praised the album: "A superb performance from Andy Williams and top production work by Dick Glasser make this a very special LP that is going to take Williams high up the charts once again."

Cashbox praised Williams' "unique ability of taking familiar material and infusing it with the breath of his own personality and delivery to make it sound brand new."

== Track listing ==
=== Side one ===
1. "Speak Softly Love (Love Theme from 'The Godfather')" (Larry Kusik, Nino Rota) – 3:05
2. "Precious and Few" (Walter Nims) – 2:54
3. "Theme from 'Summer of 42'" from Summer of '42 (Alan Bergman, Marilyn Bergman, Michel Legrand) – 3:20
4. "Everything I Own" (David Gates) – 3:22
5. "Until It's Time for You to Go" (Buffy Sainte-Marie) – 3:44
6. "An Old Fashioned Love Song" (Paul Williams) – 3:03

=== Side two ===
1. "MacArthur Park" (Jimmy Webb) – 5:03
2. "Hurting Each Other" (Gary Geld, Peter Udell) – 2:55
3. "Music from Across the Way" (James Last, Carl Sigman) – 3:45
4. "Without You" (Tom Evans, Peter Ham) – 3:16
5. "Imagine" (John Lennon) – 3:22

== Charts ==
Chart (1972)	Peak position
US Top LPs (Billboard)	29
US Cashbox	18
UK Albums Chart	11

== Recording dates ==
From the liner notes for the 2002 CD:

- January 4, 1971 – "MacArthur Park"
- April 22, 1971 – "Music from Across the Way"
- January 19, 1972 – "Theme from 'Summer of 42'", "An Old Fashioned Love Song", "Hurting Each Other"
- February 1, 1972 – "Precious and Few", "Everything I Own", "Without You"
- February 18, 1972 – "Speak Softly Love (Love Theme from 'The Godfather')", "Until It's Time for You to Go", "Imagine"

== Personnel ==
From the liner notes for the original album:

- Andy Williams – vocals
- Dick Glasser – producer
- Al Capps – arranger (except where noted)
- Artie Butler – arranger ("Theme from 'Summer of 42'", "Everything I Own", "MacArthur Park")
- Ernie Freeman – arranger ("Music from Across the Way")
- Eric Prestidge – engineer
- Peter Romano – engineer
- Rafael O. Valentin – engineer
- Ivan Nagy – front cover photo
- Keats Tyler – back cover photo

== Bibliography ==
- O'Neil, Thomas (1999). The Grammys. Perigree Books. ISBN 0-399-52477-0.
- Whitburn, Joel (2002). Joel Whitburn's Top Country Singles, 1944–2001. Record Research Inc. ISBN 0-89820-151-9.
- Whitburn, Joel (2007). Joel Whitburn Presents Billboard Top Adult Songs, 1961–2006. Record Research Inc. ISBN 978-0-89820-169-7.
- Whitburn, Joel (2009). Joel Whitburn's Top Pop Singles, 1955–2008. Record Research Inc. ISBN 978-0-89820-180-2.
- Whitburn, Joel (2010). Joel Whitburn Presents Top Pop Albums, Seventh Edition. Record Research Inc. ISBN 978-0-89820-183-3.
- Hoffmann, Frank W (1988), The Cash box album charts, 1955-1974, Scarecrow Press, ISBN 0-810-82005-6
- Larkin, Colin (2007), The Encyclopedia of Popular Music, Omnibus Press, ISBN 9-7818-4609-8567
- Downey, Pat (1994), Cash box pop singles charts, 1950-1993, Libraries Unlimited, ISBN 1-56308-316-7
