= One Day of Your Life =

- German release picture sleeve

Single by Andy Williams
- B-side: "Long Time Blues"
- Released: June 1970
- Genre: Vocal
- Length: 2:30
- Label: Columbia Records 45175
- Songwriters: Neil Sedaka; Howard Greenfield
- Producer: Dick Glasser

Andy Williams singles chronology
"Can't Help Falling in Love" (1970)	"One Day of Your Life" (1970)	"It's So Easy" (1970)

"One Day of Your Life" is a song written by Neil Sedaka and Howard Greenfield and originally performed by Alex Keenan with the most famous rendition being recorded by Andy Williams. Williams’ cover reached #2 on the adult contemporary chart and #77 on the Billboard Hot 100 in 1970.
