= Fox on the Run (Manfred Mann song) =

Single by Manfred Mann
- B-side: "Too Many People"
- Released: November 29, 1968
- Studio: Olympic, London
- Genre: Rock
- Length: 2:43
- Label: Fontana 985
- Songwriter: Tony Hazzard
- Producers: Gerry Bron; Manfred Mann

Manfred Mann singles chronology
"My Name Is Jack" (1968)	"Fox on the Run" (1968)	"Ragamuffin Man" (1969)

"Fox on the Run" is a song written by Tony Hazzard, first recorded by the English band Manfred Mann, and released as a single on 29 November 1968. It reached No. 5 on the UK Singles Chart in late January 1969.

== Charts ==
Chart (1968–69)	Peak position
Australia (Go-Set)	3
Austria (Ö3 Austria Top 40)	13
Canada Top Singles (RPM)	97
Ireland (IRMA)	2
New Zealand (Listener Chart)	1
Norway (VG-lista)	6
UK Singles (Official Charts)	5
West Germany (GfK)	7

== Other versions ==
- It was introduced to bluegrass music by Bill Emerson and quickly became a bluegrass favorite.
- The song was recorded in 1969 by the Czech group Golden Kids with only Václav Neckář singing, released on the Supraphon label in 1970 (CD release in 1993). The Czech lyrics were written by Eduard Krečmar, titled "Šel sen kolem nás".
- It was covered by American country music singer-songwriter Tom T. Hall. His version was released as a single in 1976 and peaked at No. 9 on the U.S. Billboard Hot Country Singles chart and No. 12 on the Canadian RPM Country Tracks chart.
- Tony Hazzard and Richard Barnes released a version of the song as a single in 1976 in the United Kingdom, but it did not chart.
