= More and More (Andy Williams song) =

Single by Andy Williams
- B-side: "I Want to Be Free"
- Released: July 1967
- Genre: Easy Listening
- Length: 2:22
- Label: Columbia Records 44202
- Songwriter(s): Allan Reuss, Rainey Robinson, Tommy Karen

Andy Williams singles chronology
"Music to Watch Girls By" (1967)	"More and More" (1967)	"Holly" (1967)

"More and More" is a song written by Allan Reuss, Rainey Robinson, and Tommy Karen and performed by Andy Williams. The song reached #2 on the adult contemporary chart, #45 in the UK, and #88 on the Billboard chart in 1967.

== Other versions ==
Bing Crosby released a version of the song on his 1968 album, Hey Jude / Hey Bing!.
