= Richard Barnes (musician) =

British singer and actor (1944–2025)

- Born: Richard John Barnes; 9 July 1944; Surrey, England
- Died: 19 December 2025 (aged 81) Suffolk, England
- Genres: Pop
- Occupations: Singer, actor, bassist
- Years active: 1967–1976 (singer, musician); 1977–2016 (actor)

Richard Barnes (9 July 1944 – 19 December 2025) was a British singer and actor who saw limited chart success in the early 1970s. He also worked as an actor.

== Career ==
His professional music career started with The Quiet Five in 1964, where he played bass guitar and sang vocals. The group broke up around 1967. Barnes released a solo album on Philips Records in 1970, which was produced by Gerry Bron, and scored two chart hits in the UK Singles Chart that same year. His first hit, "Take to the Mountains" reached number 35 in May 1970, and "Go North" peaked at number 38 in November. In the Dutch charts "Take to the Mountains" reached number 15. Both hits were written by Tony Hazzard.

== Acting work ==
Barnes played Jesus in the original London production of Jesus Christ Superstar at the Palace Theatre in 1972. He continued working as an actor in various television and musical theatre roles, including in the BBC's Count Dracula (1977), Doctor Who: Nightmare of Eden (1979), The Winds of War (1983) and the 1990 UK tour of Chess as Freddie Trumper.

== Death ==
Barnes died on 19 December 2025, at the age of 81. His death was confirmed in January 2026 by fellow singer Tony Hazzard.

== Discography ==
=== Albums ===
Year	Album	Record Label
1970	Richard Barnes	Philips Records
1976	Tony Hazzard and Richard Barnes	Warner Bros. Records

=== Singles ===
Year	Title	Peak chart position	Record Label	B-side	Album
Year	Title	UK	Record Label	B-side	Album
1968	"Woman, Woman"	55 (Note: Chart position is from the official UK "Breakers List".)	Columbia Records	"The Princess and the Soldier"	
1968	"Look Away"	–	Columbia Records	"Mr. Inbetween"	
1970	"Take to the Mountains"	35	Philips Records	"But It's Now I Need Your Love"	Richard Barnes
1970	"Go North"	38	Philips Records	"So Will I"	Richard Barnes
1971	"Coldwater Morning"	–	Bronze Records	"Suddenly I Know"	
1973	"Take to the Mountains" (re-release)	–	Bronze Records	"I'll Never Tell You"	Richard Barnes
1973	"Could We Start Again Please?"	–	Bronze Records	"I'm So Sad"	
1976	"Fox on the Run" (with Tony Hazzard)	–	Warner Bros. Records	"Warning Lights"	Tony Hazzard and Richard Barnes

=== Compilations ===
A compilation album was released in August 2007 by RPM Records, under the title of Take To The Mountains. It featured tracks recorded by Barnes between 1969 and 1974. The track listing was as follows:

1. "Take to the Mountains" (Hazzard)
2. "Woman, Woman" (Glaser, Payne)
3. "Maria Elena" (Hazzard)
4. "Take My Hand for a While" (Saint Marie)
5. "Your Song" (John, Taupin)
6. "The Way I Feel" (Hazzard)
7. "High Flying Electric Bird" (Brown, Mullen)
8. "London" (McKuen)
9. "I Think I'm Getting Over You" (Cook, Greenaway)
10. "Hard Headed Woman" (Stevens)
11. "Mama" (Hazzard)
12. "It's Getting Better" (Mann, Weil)
13. "Homeward Bound" (Simon)
14. "Live Till You Die" (Rhodes)
15. "Maybe" (Nilsson)
16. "Tomorrow Never Comes" (Ife, Wirtz)
17. "Could We Start Again Please" (Lloyd Webber)
18. "Coldwater Morning" (Diamond)
19. "Wandering" (Taylor)
20. "Go North" (Hazzard)
