= Raindrops Keep Fallin' on My Head (Andy Williams album) =

Studio album by Andy Williams
- Released: 1970
- Recorded: January 11, 18, 1969; March 5, 1969; November 17, 1969; February 24, 1970
- Genre: Traditional pop; vocal pop; soft rock
- Length: 32:34
- Label: Columbia
- Producer: Dick Glasser

Andy Williams chronology
Andy Williams' Greatest Hits (1970)	Raindrops Keep Fallin' on My Head (1970)	The Andy Williams Show (1970)

Alternative cover
- UK Cover

Raindrops Keep Fallin' on My Head is the twenty-fifth studio album by American pop singer Andy Williams and was released in the spring of 1970 by Columbia Records. Williams was less focused on covering recent hits on this project and instead selected several songs from the singer-songwriter genre. The concept for the album came from Mason Williams, who contacted producer Dick Glasser about co-producing an album that would give Williams's fans a medley of songs that did more than just highlight the most familiar parts of popular songs but rather focus on a unifying theme or storyline of songs that were not necessarily hit records. Billboard magazine opined that the album "may well be titled 'A Journey Through Life.' Through carefully selected songs it conveys a message of dreams, hopes, reality, frustrations and ultimate truth."

The album made its first appearance on the Top LP's chart in the issue of Billboard magazine dated June 13, 1970, and remained on the album chart for 19 weeks, peaking at number 43. it also debuted on the Cashbox albums chart in the issue dated June 27, of that year, and remained on the chart for 6 weeks, peaking at number 58 For its release in the UK, the name of the album was changed to Can't Help Falling in Love, and the song selection and track order were slightly different. It entered the UK album chart that same month, on June 20, and reached number seven over the course of 48 weeks.

The song "Can't Help Falling in Love" was one of the two tracks from the UK version of the album that did not appear on the original release. As a non-album single in the US, it entered Billboard magazine's Hot 100 chart in the issue dated February 28, 1970, and spent three weeks there, getting as high as number 88. It also began a three-week run on the magazine's chart of the week's 40 most popular Easy Listening (or Adult Contemporary) songs in that issue, where it eventually made it to number 28. The song debuted on the UK singles chart on March 14, 1970, and lasted there 17 weeks, four of which were spent at number three. The other song that was on the UK album but not the original was "It's So Easy", which entered the UK singles chart on August 1 of that year and peaked at number 13 over the course of 14 weeks.

The track from Raindrops Keep Fallin' on My Head that was left off of the Can't Help Falling in Love album in the UK was a new recording of "Sweet Memories", a song that Williams originally recorded in March 1968 with Nick DeCaro producing and arranging. That version was released as a non-album single on April 30, 1968, and reached number 75 pop and number four Easy Listening.

Raindrops Keep Fallin' on My Head was released on compact disc as one of two albums on one CD by Collectables Records on January 22, 2002, along with Williams's 1969 Columbia album, Get Together with Andy Williams. Collectables included this CD in a box set entitled Classic Album Collection, Vol. 2, which contains 15 of his studio albums and two compilations and was released on November 29, 2002.

== Reception ==
Professional ratings
Review scores
Source	Rating
AllMusic	3/5 stars
Billboard	Spotlight Pick
The Encyclopedia of Popular Music	3/5 stars

In his review of Raindrops Keep Fallin' on My Head on AllMusic.com, William Ruhlmann notes that the "LP's catalog number is out of sequence with his other releases, and it may well be that an earlier version was pulled back, since hits like the title track and 'Bridge Over Troubled Water' appear to have been added at the last minute and the recording sessions stretch across more than a year."

Billboard described the album as "a pretty work of art, skillfully created by Andy Williams."

== Track listing ==
=== North American release ===
Side one

1. "Long Time Blues" (Mason Williams) – 3:06
2. "It's Over" (Jimmie Rodgers) – 2:43
3. "Sweet Memories" (Mickey Newbury) – 3:06
4. "Raindrops Keep Fallin' on My Head" from Butch Cassidy and the Sundance Kid (Burt Bacharach, Hal David) – 3:11
5. "Bridge over Troubled Water" (Paul Simon) – 4:57

Side two

1. "Little Boy/If Wishes Were Horses" (Mike Settle) – 2:18
2. Medley – 3:52
  a. "Today" (John Hartford)
  b. "Today" from Advance to the Rear (Randy Sparks)
3. "Reason to Believe" (Tim Hardin) – 2:58
4. "Simple Thing As Love" (Hartford) – 2:44
5. "Both Sides Now" (Joni Mitchell) – 3:43

=== UK release ===
Side one

1. "Bridge over Troubled Water" (Simon) – 4:57
2. "Raindrops Keep Fallin' on My Head" from Butch Cassidy and the Sundance Kid (Bacharach, David) – 3:11
3. "Can't Help Falling in Love" (George Weiss, Hugo Peretti, Luigi Creatore) – 3:15
4. "It's Over" (Rodgers) – 2:43
5. "It's So Easy" (Dor Lee, Dave Watkins) – 2:29
6. "Long Time Blues" (Williams) – 3:06

Side two

1. "Little Boy/If Wishes Were Horses" (Settle) – 2:18
2. Medley – 3:52
  a. "Today" (Hartford)
  b. "Today" from Advance to the Rear (Sparks)
3. "Reason to Believe" (Hardin) – 2:58
4. "Simple Thing As Love" (Hartford) – 2:44
5. "Both Sides Now" (Mitchell) – 3:43

== Charts ==
Chart (1970)	Peak position
US Top LPs (Billboard)	43
US Cashbox	58
UK Albums Chart	7

== Recording dates ==
=== North American release ===
From the liner notes for the 2002 CD:

- January 11, 1969 – "It's Over", "Sweet Memories"
- January 18, 1969 – "Long Time Blues"
- March 5, 1969 – "Reason to Believe", "Simple Thing As Love"
- November 17, 1969 – "Little Boy/If Wishes Were Horses", "Today Medley", "Both Sides Now"
- February 24, 1970 – "Raindrops Keep Fallin' on My Head", "Bridge over Troubled Water"

=== UK release (additional tracks) ===
From the liner notes for The Complete Columbia Chart Singles Collection:

- January 14, 1970 – "Can't Help Falling in Love"
- January 14, 1970 – January 16, 1970 – "It's So Easy"

== Personnel ==
From the liner notes for the original album:

- Andy Williams – vocals
- Dick Glasser – producer
- Mason Williams – side two concept ("Little Boy/If Wishes Were Horses", "Today Medley", "Reason to Believe", "Simple Thing As Love", "Both Sides Now": conceived by Mason Williams)
- Al Capps – arranger, conductor
- Peter Romano – engineer
- Rafael O. Valentin – engineer
- Keats Tyler – front and back cover photos
- Peter James Samerjan – inside photo

== Bibliography ==
- Whitburn, Joel (1993), Joel Whitburn's Top Adult Contemporary, 1961–1993, Record Research Inc., ISBN 0-89820-099-7
- Whitburn, Joel (1999), Joel Whitburn's Top Pop Singles, 1955-1999, Record Research Inc., ISBN 0-89820-140-3
- Whitburn, Joel (2010), Joel Whitburn Presents Top Pop Albums, Seventh Edition, Record Research Inc., ISBN 978-0-89820-183-3
