= Holly (song) =

- 1971 German release picture sleeve

Single by Andy Williams

from the album Love, Andy
- B-side: "When I Look in Your Eyes"
- Released: November 1967
- Genre: Easy Listening
- Length: 2:25
- Label: Columbia Records 44325
- Songwriter(s): Craig Smith

Andy Williams singles chronology
| "More and More" (1967) | "Holly" (1967) | "Can't Take My Eyes Off You" (1968) |

"Holly" is a song written by Craig Smith and performed by Andy Williams. The song reached #4 on the adult contemporary chart and #113 on the Billboard chart in 1967.
