= Samsung SGH-D820 =

Slider phone

The Samsung SGH-D820 is a slider phone created by Samsung Electronics. It was announced in Q4 2005, and is now discontinued. It is the non-US version of the SGH-T809.

== Features ==
The phone has a 1.3-megapixel camera, has a TFT display capable of displaying 256 thousand colours. It has a microSD slot, and is able to store 30 dialed, 30 received, and 30 missed calls. It allows for SMS, EMS, and MMS messaging, and email, and has quadband support.
