= Angels in the Sky (Dick Glasser song) =

1954 Song by Dick Glasser

Song by Dick Glasser
- Published: 1954
- Songwriter: Dick Glasser

"Angels in the Sky" is a popular song by Dick Glasser. It was published in 1954 and has been recorded by a number of artists. The first recording was by Glasser himself and was issued on Jack Gale's label, Triple A (#2522), flipped with "Is It Too Late?", another Glasser composition. In 1954, Gale would strike a deal with RCA Victor for the song and it was then recorded and released by Tony Martin on RCA Victor #5757 about August 1954, flipped with "Boulevard Of Nightingales". A part of the deal was that Glasser's recording would be withdrawn from the market.

The biggest hit for the song would happen later in the following year with a version by The Crew-Cuts on Mercury Records #70741. It first reached the Billboard charts on December 17, 1955. On the Disk Jockey chart, it peaked at #16; on the Best Seller chart, at #11; on the Juke Box chart, at #13; on the composite chart of the top 100 songs, it reached #13. The flip side was "Mostly Martha".

Dick Glasser re-recorded the song after having signed with Columbia Records by Autumn 1958. It was released as his third single for the label (#41357) about March 1959, this time flipped with "Get Thee Behind Me".
