= Craig Smith (musician) =

American singer-songwriter (1945–2012)

- Also known as: Maitreya Kali, Satya Sai Maitreya Kali
- Born: Craig Vincent Smith; April 25, 1945; Los Angeles, U.S.
- Died: March 16, 2012 (aged 66) Los Angeles, U.S.
- Genres: Pop, psychedelic folk, rock
- Occupations: Musician, songwriter, actor
- Instruments: Guitar, voice
- Years active: 1963–1972; sporadically to the late 1990s
- Labels: Capitol Records, Akashic Records, United Kingdom of America Records

Craig Vincent Smith (April 25, 1945 – March 16, 2012) was an American musician, songwriter and actor. He began his career in the 1960s playing pop and folk music, and appearing on The Andy Williams Show. Smith wrote several songs that were recorded by successful artists of the time including Glen Campbell, The Monkees, and Andy Williams. After using drugs while travelling on the hippie trail, he had mental health problems which worsened over time. He released two solo albums, Apache and Inca, in the early 1970s under the names Maitreya Kali and Satya Sai Maitreya Kali. After spending nearly three years in prison for assaulting his mother, he spent the majority of the next 35 years homeless.

== Early and personal life ==
Smith was born in Los Angeles, the son of Charles "Chuck" Smith and Marguerite "Carole" Smith (née Lundquist). His father was a descendant of gospel songwriter Charles H. Gabriel. His mother was of Swedish and German descent. Smith had two older brothers and one younger sister. Chuck Smith had worked as a manager at the Jade Room, a nightclub owned by Larry Potter, and was known by the stage name Chuck Barclay. After World War Two he worked as a welder and a salesman. Chuck died in 1978, aged 64, from a stroke, and Carole died in 1998, aged 82, from pulmonary disease.

Smith attended Grant High School, becoming class president and being on the school gymnastics team. He graduated in June 1963, and turned down a number of offers from colleges in order to pursue a career in the entertainment industry.

== Career ==
=== 1963–1966: the Good Time Singers ===
In August 1963 Smith was recruited by Michael Storm and Tom Drake (who had performed together as the Other Singers) to join the Good Time Singers, a band formed to replace the New Christy Minstrels on The Andy Williams Show. From December 1963 to January 1964 Smith and Storm also performed shows with Gordon and Sheila MacRae, supported by their daughters Heather and Meredith. The Good Time Singers released their debut self-titled album in January 1964, and their second album One Step More in October 1964. In between the albums they had embarked on a 17-city tour. Around this time Smith began songwriting, and he wrote a song called "Christmas Holiday", which was recorded by Andy Williams for his 1965 album Merry Christmas. As the Good Times Singers' was ending, Smith and fellow bandmember Lee Montgomery intended to form a new duo called Craig & Lee, but Smith had to pull out after successfully auditioning for a new ABC television show, called The Happeners. Smith had previously unsuccessfully auditioned for The Monkees. The pilot for The Happeners was filmed in November 1965. The Good Times Singers' contract for The Andy Williams Show was not renewed past 1966.

=== 1966–1967: The Happeners and Chris & Craig ===
After a successful audition process, Smith won the role of Alan Howard on The Happeners. The show was to be directed by David Greene, and was a mix of acting and singing, set in New York and based on the fictional eponymous folk trio. However, ABC declined to pick up the show following the pilot episode. Smith and his The Happeners co-star Chris Ducey decided to form a musical duo called Chris & Craig. They moved into an apartment together and began writing songs. They signed to Capitol Records, recording a number of demos throughout the summer of 1966. Their first single, "Isha", was written by Ducey b/w "I Need You" written by Smith, and was produced by Steve Douglas utilizing session musicians Hal Blaine and Carol Kaye of The Wrecking Crew. It was released in July 1966. Another single, "I Cant't Go On" (written by Ducey), was produced with the same line up. Originally an acoustic duo utitilizing session musicians, during their later 1966 sessions they began experimenting with a full band, and in November 1966 they played a show supporting the Mothers of Invention with such a full band, with Smith and Ducey playing electric guitars. Throughout late 1966 and early 1967 the duo continued to write and record more songs, but they were never released by the label. In 1967 Smith befriended Gábor Szabó and the Beach Boys, unsuccessfully offering to write songs for the latter. In early 1967 Chris & Craig began playing with a permanent backing band. Through their friendship with Michael Nesmith of the Monkees, they hired Jerry Perenchio as their manager. They changed their name to the Penny Arcade, shortly becoming the Penny Arkade for trademark reasons.

=== 1967–1968: the Penny Arkade ===
Nesmith began producing Smith and Ducey, initially pairing them with John London (bass) and Johnny Raines (drums). They were eventually replaced by Donald F. Glut on bass (who had appeared in an earlier incarnation of the band) and Bobby Donaho on drums. While the band worked on their own material, Smith continued to write songs, including "Salesman" for the Monkees, and "Hands of the Clock" and "Lazy Sunny Day" for Heather MacRae. Smith was also credited as co-producer for the songs, alongside Bob Thiele. He also wrote "Holly" for Williams. Nesmith took the band into a studio to record their album. One of the songs written at this time by Smith was "Country Girl", which was later recorded and released by Glen Campbell for his Try a Little Kindness album. The album never materialised, but some of the songs were collected and released as Not the Freeze in 2004. After a bad review of one of their live shows, the band decided to concentrate on writing and recording songs. In early 1968 they unsuccessfully auditioned for the role of house band on the TV show Peyton Place. In February 1968 Smith and his father went into business together, running a bar called the Buckeye Inn. In late 1968 Smith was associating with the Manson Family, and exploring an interest in Eastern philosophy, particularly Transcendental Meditation. Smith eventually left the Penny Arkade and decided to go travelling. The band continued without Smith until 1969, renamed as the Armadillo and with Bob Arthur as a replacement guitarist.

=== 1968: travelling to Asia ===
After previously smoking small amounts of marijuana with friends, Smith began using LSD in 1968. During his travels Smith took LSD on a "regular" basis, and he smoked "copious amounts of hashish" while in Afghanistan. Smith decided to travel to India alone, with just a guitar and a backpack. He set off to join the hippie trail, arriving in Turkey in October 1968, possibly via Austria and Greece. Smith met fellow Western travellers (an Irishman and two American women) in Istanbul, and they set off together in a VW van, intending to drive to Delhi. After the van broke down, they hitched a ride in a lorry transporting olive oil, before taking a bus to Iran. They passed through Afghanistan, with Smith deciding to leave his companions for a few days in Kandahar while they travelled on to Kabul. Smith never joined them in Kabul; when his companions returned to Kandahar a few months later, they heard rumours that he had "gone crazy", running through the market with a knife threatening people, and then disappeared. It later became apparent that after threatening a market vendor, Smith had been beaten close to death and robbed, and possibly kidnapped and raped. Smith possibly spent some time in an Afghan insane asylum, where he is thought to have developed acute schizophrenia. It is not known if Smith ever reached India, although he and his travelogue claims he did visit India and reconnected with the Maharishi and went to Nepal.

=== 1969–1970: return to United States and travelling to South America ===
Smith returned to the United States in late 1968 or early 1969, initially living back with his parents. He was possibly institutionalized and medicated for a short period. By this stage he was using the name "Maitreya Kali", which he intended to become his legal name, although this didn't happen until 1971. He continued to receive royalty checks from his historical songwriting for Williams and Campbell, amongst others. After his girlfriend left him, Smith decided to travel to South America, spending time in Peru, Ecuador, Bolivia, Argentina, and the Galapagos Islands of Chile. Returning from South America, Smith reunited with his girlfriend, and they became engaged. When the engagement ended, Smith ripped up the wedding dress his fiancée had chosen. Following another brief re-connection, the relationship ended for good when Smith violently threatened one of her male friends.

=== 1970–1971: deterioration in mental health ===
Smith claimed to have mystical powers, and thought he was a messiah. He prophesied that he would be "King of the World" by 2000. He claimed to be a reincarnation of Jesus, Buddha, and Hitler. As his erratic and bizarre behavior became more pronounced, such as claiming voices were telling him to kill people, his friends started to ignore him. One friend eventually had to obtain a restraining order against Smith. His appearance became more and more unkempt, with long hair and a wild beard. At one point, he shaved his head and beard off, and dressed in robes, his appearance comparable to a Buddhist monk, although his hair and beard would later grow back. He visited Heather and Sheila MacRae in Miami, and was asked to leave by Sheila's new husband after he woke up to find Smith standing over their bed with a knife. Heather saw him again in Los Angeles in 1972, when he "looked really scary [...] just totally looked insane, and would say weird things."

=== 1971–1972: Apache and Inca ===
Smith wrote two solo albums Apache and Inca in 1971, which were self-released in 1972. In the liner notes to both albums, Smith claims to have played every instrument. The liner notes as a whole have been described as "bizarre [and] rambling", and display his belief system. Apache was released on his own 'Akashic Records', and features three songs from the Penny Arkade recording sessions. Inca was released a few months after Apache, in the summer of 1972, not as a standalone album but as a double gatefold with Apache on his new 'United Kingdom of America Records' label. Like Apache, Inca also features songs from the Penny Arkade recording sessions. The albums were mainly distributed to Smith's friends or sold on the street.

=== 1973–1976: prison ===
After the albums were released, Smith sold his car with the intention of going to Ethiopia. His mental health problems continued, such as suggesting to a friend that they fight to the death using samurai swords. He also had a small black spider tattooed in the middle of his forehead in 1972 or 1973. On April 22, 1973, Smith attacked his mother at the family home. An attempted murder charge was not established, and following a psychiatric examination, he pleaded 'no contest' to a charge of assault. He was sentenced in November 1973 to six months to life, the maximum sentence for the offence, and the Judge suggested intense medical and psychiatric treatment. He began his sentence at the California Institution for Men, before transferring to the Deuel Vocational Institution in December 1973. He transferred again, to the California Men's Colony, in February 1974. He was granted parole at the fourth attempt, and was released from prison in June 1976.

=== 1977–2012: later years and death ===
Suzannah Jordan, the third member of The Happeners trio, ran into Smith in LA in 1977; he was homeless but did not display any obvious mental health issues. He drifted in and out of mental hospitals until the mid-1980s when funding was cut, and would then spend the next years homeless. He also had various run-ins with the law. In 1981 or 1982 he saw another old friend and told her he had been recording music. He has been indeed recording music, according to Mike Stax, as late as the late 1990s, which includes the 1994 song "Waves", which was released on the 2018 CD version of the album Love is Our Existence. By the early 2000s his "ramblings" had moved from Eastern philosophy/his Maitreya Kali persona to aliens. Smith died on March 16, 2012. His family declined to collect his ashes, and they were eventually collected by journalist Mike Stax.

== Discography ==
=== With The Penny Arkade ===
- Not the Freeze (Recorded in 1967–68) (Sundazed, 2004)

=== Studio albums ===
- Apache (Released under the name Satya Sai Maitreya Kali) (Akashic Records, 1971) (Re-issued on Maitreya Apache Records, 2019 together with Inca)
- Inca (Released under the name Satya Sai Maitreya Kali) (United Kingdom of America Records, 1972) (Re-issued on Maitreya Apache Records, 2019 together with Apache)
- Love is Our Existence (Maitreya Apache Music, 2018)

== Sources ==
- Stax, Mike (2016). Swim Through the Darkness: My Search for Craig Smith and the Mystery of Maitreya Kali. Process Media. ISBN 9781934170656.
