= Get Together with Andy Williams =

Studio album by Andy Williams
- Released: October 6, 1969
- Recorded: June 16, 1969, July 8, 10, 12, 1969, August 1969
- Genres: AM pop; traditional pop; vocal pop
- Length: 35:50
- Label: Columbia
- Producer: Jerry Fuller

Andy Williams chronology
Happy Heart (1969)	Get Together with Andy Williams (1969)	Andy Williams' Greatest Hits (1970)

Get Together with Andy Williams is the twenty-fourth studio album by American pop singer Andy Williams which was released on October 6, 1969, by Columbia Records and contained covers of recent hits. The one new song was "You Are", which was written by Mac Davis.

The album made its first appearance on the Top LPs chart in the issue of Billboard magazine dated November 8, 1969, and remained there for 21 weeks, peaking at number 27. it also entered the Cashbox Top 100 Albums chart in the issue dated November 8, 1969, and remained on the chart for 14 weeks, peaking at number 22. It entered the UK album chart on December 27 of that year and reached number 13 over the course of 10 weeks, and the Recording Industry Association of America awarded the album Gold certification on February 19, 1970.

The album was released on compact disc as one of two albums on one CD by Collectables Records on January 22, 2002, along with Williams's 1970 Columbia album, Raindrops Keep Fallin' on My Head. Collectables included this CD in a box set entitled Classic Album Collection, Vol. 2, which contains 15 of his studio albums and two compilations and was released on November 29, 2002.

== Reception ==
Professional ratings
Review scores
Source	Rating
Allmusic	3/5 stars
The Encyclopedia of Popular Music	2/5 stars

William Ruhlmann of Allmusic's said, "one of these songs were better suited to him than others. Charles Aznavour's 'Yesterday When I Was Young,' was an emotional ballad right up Williams' alley, as was "'ove Theme From Romeo and Juliet,' Even 'Quentin's Theme (Shadows of the Night),' the theme song from the popular vampire soap opera Dark Shadows, gave him something familiar to work with."

Billboard magazine felt that "his fresh, warm interpretation of the familiar hits makes this another winner. His easygoing style is especially effective on 'Yesterday When I Was Young' and 'Quentin's Theme'."

Cashbox noted that "He sings his earnest manner a host of currently pop tunes including 'My Cherie Amour,' 'Yesterday When I Was Young' [...] 'Good Morning Starshine,' [...] and 'Get Together'."

== Track listing ==
=== Side one ===
1. "My Cherie Amour" (Henry Cosby, Sylvia Moy, Stevie Wonder) – 3:02
2. "You Are" (Mac Davis) – 2:32
3. "Yesterday When I Was Young" (Charles Aznavour, Herbert Kretzmer) – 3:52
4. "Love Theme from Romeo and Juliet (A Time for Us)" from Romeo and Juliet (Larry Kusik, Nino Rota, Eddie Snyder) – 2:35
5. "Quentin's Theme (Shadows of the Night)" from Dark Shadows (Robert Cobert, Charles Randolph Grean) – 3:09

=== Side two ===
1. "Good Morning Starshine" from Hair; performed with The Osmond Brothers and Friends (Galt MacDermot, James Rado, Gerome Ragni) – 4:15
2. "Sweet Caroline" (Neil Diamond) – 3:25
3. "Get Together" performed with Loadstone (Chester Powers) – 3:56
4. "More Today Than Yesterday" performed with The Osmond Brothers (Pat Upton) – 2:58
5. "Put a Little Love in Your Heart" performed with Loadstone and Girls (Jackie DeShannon, Jimmy Holiday, Randy Myers) – 2:18
6. "Aquarius/Let the Sunshine In" from Hair; performed with The Osmond Brothers (MacDermot, Rado, Ragni) – 3:51

== Charts ==
Chart peaks for Get Together with Andy Williams
Chart (1969)	Peak position
UK Official Albums Chart	13
US Top LPs (Billboard)	27
US Top 100 Albums (Cashbox)	22

== Recording dates ==
From the liner notes for the CD:

- June 16, 1969 – "You Are"
- July 8, 1969 – "Yesterday When I Was Young", "Love Theme from Romeo and Juliet (A Time for Us)", "Quentin's Theme (Shadows of the Night)"
- July 10, 1969 – "Good Morning Starshine", "More Today Than Yesterday", "Aquarius/Let the Sunshine In"
- July 12, 1969 – "My Cherie Amour", "Sweet Caroline"
- August 18, 1969 – August 26, 1969 - "Get Together", "Put a Little Love in Your Heart"

== Personnel ==
From the liner notes for the original album:

- Andy Williams - vocals
- Jerry Fuller - producer
- Al Capps - arranger, conductor
- Peter Romano - engineer
- Guy Webster - cover photo

== Bibliography ==
- Whitburn, Joel (2010), Joel Whitburn Presents Top Pop Albums, Seventh Edition, Record Research Inc., ISBN 0-89820-183-7
