= The Way We Were (Andy Williams album) =

Studio album by Andy Williams
- Released: 1974
- Recorded: March 1974
- Genres: Vocal pop; traditional pop; soft rock
- Length: 38:27
- Label: Columbia
- Producer: Mike Curb

Andy Williams chronology
Solitaire (1973)	The Way We Were (1974)	Christmas Present (1974)

Alternate cover
- The Way We Were (UK)

The Way We Were is the thirty-second studio album by American pop singer Andy Williams, released in the spring of 1974 by Columbia Records and was a return to singing songs that his audience was already familiar with after Solitaire, his previous LP that was less reliant on covers of recent pop hits, did not perform well.

This was his first studio album out of 25 released by Columbia that didn't make either the Billboard 200 or Christmas Albums charts, but it debuted on the Cashbox albums chart in the issue dated June 8, of that year, and remained on the chart for three weeks, peaking at number 154 it also reach number seven in the UK during a 10-week run that began on June 15 of that year. The UK release featured a different cover photo, but the track listing for both versions was the same. On December 1, 1974, the British Phonographic Industry awarded the album with Silver certification for sales of 60,000 units in the UK.

The single "Love's Theme" entered Billboard magazine's list of the 40 most popular Easy Listening songs of the week in the US in the issue dated June 8, 1974, and stayed on the chart for 11 weeks, peaking at number 16.

The Way We Were was released on compact disc as one of two albums on one CD by Collectables Records on January 22, 2002, along with Williams's 1972 Columbia album, Love Theme from "The Godfather". Collectables included this CD in a box set entitled Classic Album Collection, Vol. 2, which contains 15 of his studio albums and two compilations, and was released on November 29, 2002.

== Reception ==
Professional ratings
Review scores
Source	Rating
Allmusic	3/5 stars
Billboard	Top Album Pick
The Encyclopedia of Popular Music	3/5 stars

William Ruhlmann of AllMusic said that the album showed Williams "returned to his usual formula for LP-making with picking songs from among the previous year's hit parade."

Billboard felt that the album would succeed. "Once more, Williams brings home a winner. Well-paced throughout, this disk delivers Williams at his best—gliding smoothly through each tune with his unique ability to finesse a lyric to the fullest. Full arrangements and studio mix a definite plus."

Cashbox magazine praised Williams for his "interesting new approach to contemporary music."

Record World wrote in their review stated "Andy returns to what he does best: Singing today's favorites ... and possibly tomorrow's standards."

Both AllMusic and The Encyclopedia of Popular Music gave the album a three-star ratings, the latter's rating meaning they believed the album was "Good by the artist's usual standrands, ane therefore recommended." by Williams' usual releases.

== Track listing ==
=== Side one ===
1. "You're the Best Thing That Ever Happened to Me" (Jim Weatherly) - 4:20
2. "I Won't Last a Day Without You" (Roger Nichols, Paul Williams) - 5:19
3. "Killing Me Softly with Her Song" (Charles Fox, Norman Gimbel) - 4:31
4. "Touch Me in the Morning" (Michael Masser, Ron Miller) - 3:55
5. "Love's Theme" (Aaron Schroeder, Barry White) - 2:59

=== Side two ===
1. "Sunshine on My Shoulders" (John Denver, Dick Kniss, Mike Taylor) - 3:11
2. "The Way We Were" from The Way We Were (Alan Bergman, Marilyn Bergman, Marvin Hamlisch) - 3:18
3. "The Most Beautiful Girl" (Rory Michael Bourke, Billy Sherrill, Norris Wilson) - 3:12
4. "Seasons in the Sun" (Jacques Brel, Rod McKuen) - 4:41
5. "If I Could Only Go Back Again" (Mike Curb, Alan Osmond) - 3:06

== Personnel ==
From the liner notes for the original album:

- Andy Williams - vocals
- Mike Curb - producer
- Don Costa - arranger ("Love's Theme", "If I Could Only Go Back Again"), director of arrangements
- Ralph Ferraro - arranger ("I Won't Last a Day without You", "Killing Me Softly with Her Song", "Sunshine on My Shoulders", "Seasons in the Sun")
- Edward Karam - arranger ("Touch Me in the Morning", "The Way We Were")
- Nick Perito - arranger ("You're the Best Thing That Ever Happened to Me", "The Most Beautiful Girl")
- Ed Greene - engineer
- Michael Lloyd - engineer
- John Puckett - engineer
- Keats Tyler - photography
- Anne Garner - design

== Bibliography ==
- Whitburn, Joel (2002), Joel Whitburn's Top Country Singles, 1944-2001, Record Research Inc., ISBN 0-89820-151-9
- Whitburn, Joel (2004), Joel Whitburn Presents Top R&B/Hip-Hop Singles, 1942-2004, Record Research Inc., ISBN 0-89820-160-8
- Whitburn, Joel (2007), Joel Whitburn Presents Billboard Top Adult Songs, 1961-2006, Record Research Inc., ISBN 978-0-89820-169-7
- Larkin, Colin (2007), The Encyclopedia of Popular Music, Omnibus Press, ISBN 9-7818-4609-8567
- Whitburn, Joel (2009), Joel Whitburn's Top Pop Singles, 1955-2008, Record Research Inc., ISBN 978-0-89820-180-2
