= It's So Easy (Andy Williams song) =

- Dutch release picture sleeve

Single by Andy Williams

from the album Raindrops Keep Fallin' on My Head
- B-side: "Long Time Blues"
- Released: August 1970
- Genre: Easy listening
- Length: 2:27
- Label: CBS Records 5113
- Songwriter(s): Dave Watkins, Dor Lee

Andy Williams singles chronology
"One Day of Your Life" (1970)	"It's So Easy" (1970)	"Home Lovin' Man" (1970)

"It's So Easy" is a song composed by Dave Watkins with words by Watkins and Dor Lee and performed by Andy Williams. The song reached #13 in the UK in 1970 and #19 in Ireland.
