= Music to Watch Girls By =

1966 single by Bob Crewe

- Dutch release picture sleeve

Single by The Bob Crewe Generation

from the album Music to Watch Girls By
- B-side: "Girls On the Rocks"
- Released: December 1966
- Genre: Pop
- Length: 2:27
- Label: DynoVoice
- Songwriter: Sid Ramin
- Producer: Bob Crewe

The Bob Crewe Generation singles chronology
"The Whiffenpoof Song" (1960)	"Music to Watch Girls By" (1966)	"After the Ball" (1967)

"Music to Watch Girls By" was the first Top 40 hit by Bob Crewe using his own name, recorded by his group The Bob Crewe Generation. The music was composed by Sidney "Sid" Ramin.

== Background ==
Crewe first heard the song performed in a jingle demo for a Diet Pepsi commercial, and according to Greg Adams, writing for All Music Guide, the song "exemplified the groovy state of instrumental music at that time." In Bob Crewe's version, a trumpet plays the whole verse, the first time around, sounding like Herb Alpert's Tijuana brass style. The second time the verse is played, a half step up in tone from G minor to A-flat minor, a tenor saxophone plays a jazzier version, accompanied by strings, surf-style guitar (reminiscent of 1960s spy films) and a harpsichord, that play a counter-melody. The trumpets finish up the refrain, and all of the parts are played, repeating the first part in the coda, before the fade.

=== Chart performance ===
The "big-band, horn driven" recording peaked at #15 on the Billboard Hot 100 the week of February 11, 1967 and #2 on the Easy Listening chart.

Chart (1967)	Peak position
US Billboard Easy Listening	2
US Billboard Hot 100	15

== Andy Williams version ==
"Music to Watch Girls By"

Single by Andy Williams

from the album Born Free
- B-side: "The Face I Love"
- Released: March 1967
- Genre: Pop
- Length: 2:32
- Label: Columbia
- Composer: Sid Ramin
- Lyricist: Tony Velona
- Producer: Nick De Caro

Andy Williams singles chronology
"In the Arms of Love" (1966)	"Music to Watch Girls By" (1967)	"More and More" (1967)

A vocal recording from 1967 by Andy Williams, featuring lyrics written by Tony Velona, peaked at #34 on the Billboard Hot 100 the weeks of April 29 and May 6, 1967. This version was later used in a Fiat advertisement in the UK in 1999, with the re-released single reaching the top ten in that country. This same version was also used in Samsung's commercial for the D820 cell phone in 2005.

=== Chart performance ===
Chart (1967)	Peak position
UK Singles (The Official Charts Company)	33
US Billboard Easy Listening	2
US Billboard Hot 100	34

Chart (1999)	Peak position
UK Singles (The Official Charts Company)	9

=== Certifications and sales ===
Region	Certification	Certified units/sales
United Kingdom (BPI)	Silver	200,000^{‡}
^{‡} Sales+streaming figures based on certification alone.

== Other recordings ==
- A version by Al Hirt reached #31 on the Adult Contemporary chart and #119 on the Billboard Hot 100 in 1967.
- A version by French singer Jean-Paul Keller with the title of "Ça S'est Arrange" with French lyrics by André Salvet and Claude Carrère was also released in 1967. This version was also included in the soundtrack of A Simple Favor (film) in 2018.
- A version by French singer France Gall with the title of "Die schönste Musik, die es gibt" with words in German.
