= Tony Hazzard =

English singer-songwriter (born 1943)

- Born: Anthony Hazzard; 31 October 1943 (age 82); Liverpool, England
- Genres: Pop music
- Occupations: Singer, songwriter
- Instruments: Guitar, ukulele
- Years active: 1960s–present
- Website: www.tonyhazzard.com

Anthony Hazzard (born 31 October 1943) is an English singer-songwriter. He has written songs for The Hollies ("Listen to Me"), Manfred Mann ("Ha! Ha! Said the Clown" and "Fox on the Run"), Lulu ("Me, The Peaceful Heart"), The Yardbirds ("Goodnight Sweet Josephine"), Herman's Hermits ("You Won't Be Leaving"), Peter Noone ("(I Think I'm Over) Getting Over You"), The Tremeloes ("Hello World"), Gene Pitney ("Maria Elena"), Richard Barnes ("Take to the Mountains"), and Andy Williams ("Getting Over You") amongst others.

== Career ==
Hazzard learned the guitar and ukulele when young, but did not start his music career until he finished his studies at Durham University. Encouraged by Tony Garnett of the BBC, Hazzard moved to London, where he signed a contract with publisher Gerry Bron.

His song "The Sound of the Candyman's Trumpet" was recorded by Cliff Richard and entered into the 1968 Songs for Europe preamble for the Eurovision Song Contest. Simon Dupree and the Big Sound, The Casuals, The Family Dogg, and The Swinging Blue Jeans all turned to Hazzard's pop tunes in the late 1960s. In the midst of all this success as a writer, Hazzard released his first solo album, Tony Hazzard Sings Tony Hazzard, in 1969. It was commercially unsuccessful, but his second album, Loudwater House, fared better. He recorded backing vocals for Elton John's albums Tumbleweed Connection (1970) and Honky Château (1972).

His third album, Was That Alright Then (1973), sold poorly. A two-disc set titled Go North: The Bronze Anthology was released in 2005. In 2011, he released a CD of new work, entitled Songs From The Lynher. Hazzard lives in Cornwall and continues to work as a composer.
