= Home Lovin' Man =

Single by Andy Williams

from the album Alone Again (Naturally)
- B-side: "Whistling Away the Dark"
- Released: November 1970
- Genre: Vocal
- Length: 3:18
- Label: Columbia Records 45246
- Songwriter(s): Roger Cook, Roger Greenaway, Tony Macaulay
- Producer(s): Dick Glasser

Andy Williams singles chronology
"It's So Easy" (1970)	"Home Lovin' Man" (1970)	"(Where Do I Begin) Love Story" (1971)

"Home Lovin' Man" is a song written by Roger Cook, Roger Greenaway, and Tony Macaulay and performed by Andy Williams. The song reached #7 in the UK and #10 on the US adult contemporary chart in 1970.

The song was also covered by Tony Christie on his 1971 Tony Christie album (MCA MKPS 2016) and by Roger Whittaker as the title track for his 1979 album Home Lovin' Man (Tembo 841 165-2).
