= Moon River and Other Great Movie Themes =

Studio album by Andy Williams
- Released: March 26, 1962 (LP); April 7, 1987 (CD)
- Recorded: 1962
- Genre: Traditional pop; standards; soundtrack
- Length: 36:36
- Label: Columbia
- Producer: Robert Mersey

Andy Williams chronology
Danny Boy and Other Songs I Love to Sing (1962)	Moon River and Other Great Movie Themes (1962)	Warm and Willing (1962)

Moon River and Other Great Movie Themes is the ninth studio album by American pop singer Andy Williams. It was released on March 26, 1962, by Columbia Records and covered film songs that were mostly from the previous decade.

The album debuted on Billboard magazine's Top LP's chart in the issue dated May 12, 1962 and remained there for 176 weeks (the longest chart run of any of his albums), peaking at number 3. it also debuted on the Cashbox albums chart in the issue dated April 28, 1962, and remained on the chart for 183 weeks, peaking at number 4.

The album received Gold certification from the Recording Industry Association of America on October 14, 1963, and thus became Williams's earliest recording to achieve this honor but not, however, the first to do so. His Days of Wine and Roses and Other TV Requests album, which was released in April 1963, received its Gold certification just one month prior to this one. By 1967, the album had sold more than two million copies.

Moon River and Other Great Movie Themes was released on compact disc by Columbia in 1987. It was also released as one of two albums on one CD by Sony Music Distribution on May 15, 2001, along with Williams's 1962 Columbia album, Danny Boy and Other Songs I Love to Sing.

== Album concept ==
In his autobiography Moon River and Me: A Memoir, Williams describes how Archie Bleyer, the head of his former record label, Cadence Records, had discouraged the singer from recording the song "Moon River" in 1961, assuming that young people wouldn't understand the line "my huckleberry friend". Williams writes, "He thought it was too abstract and didn't think it would be a hit single, so he turned it down." Williams moved on shortly thereafter to Columbia Records, where the powers-that-be loved the idea of an entire album of songs from movies, and he wound up recording the rejected song on January 4, 1962. A few months later he was again offered the chance to sing "Moon River", this time at the Academy Awards on April 9 because of its nomination for Best Original Song. The April 28 issue of Billboard magazine reported that the album had "racked up orders, according to Columbia Records, of close to 40,000 within two weeks' release. Platter was rushed out by the label to coincide with Williams' performance of the Mancini tune on the Academy Awards Show a fortnight ago."

== Reception ==
Professional ratings
Review scores
Source	Rating
Allmusic	4/5 stars
The Encyclopedia of Popular Music	4/5 stars
Disc	5/5 stars

Billboard magazine described the album as "a listenable album", saying that it features a "selection of movie songs." Cashbox gave positive results, saying he "displays a wide vocal range as he gives full-voiced treatments of 'Love Is A Many Splendored Thing'." Variety noted in its review that "Williams's style is smooth and winning and Robert Mersey's arrangement add to the overall zest". American Record Guide noted "Andy Williams gives his usual pleasant vocal treatment to a number of more or less current film songs. Nigel Hunter of Disc notes "His voice is absolutcly faultless from start to finish, presenting these high-calibre compositions at his very best, and Robert Mersey's arrangement and backings put the final gloss on these great tracks", giving it a five-star rating." while both The Encyclopedia of Popular Music and AllMusic gave the album a four-star rating as well.

William Ruhlmann of AllMusic felt that Williams did a "masterful version" of the title track and "also does well with the rest of the songs," calling the album "a highlight in the singer's career."

== Track listing ==
=== Side one ===
1. "Love Is a Many-Splendored Thing" from Love Is a Many-Splendored Thing (Sammy Fain, Paul Francis Webster) – 2:55
2. "The Theme from A Summer Place" from A Summer Place (Mack Discant, Max Steiner) – 2:38
3. "Maria" from West Side Story (Leonard Bernstein, Stephen Sondheim) – 3:43
4. "Never on Sunday" from Never on Sunday (Manos Hadjidakis, Billy Towne) – 3:02
5. "As Time Goes By" from Everybody's Welcome (Herman Hupfeld) – 3:11
6. "The Exodus Song (This Land Is Mine)" from Exodus (Pat Boone, Ernest Gold) – 3:16

=== Side two ===
1. "Moon River" from Breakfast at Tiffany's (Henry Mancini, Johnny Mercer) – 2:46
2. "Tonight" from West Side Story (Leonard Bernstein, Stephen Sondheim) – 2:37
3. "The Second Time Around" from High Time (Sammy Cahn, Jimmy Van Heusen) – 3:23
4. "Tender Is the Night" from Tender Is the Night (Fain, Webster) – 3:05
5. "It Might as Well Be Spring" from State Fair (Oscar Hammerstein II, Richard Rodgers) – 3:11
6. "Three Coins in the Fountain" from Three Coins in the Fountain (Cahn, Jule Styne) – 2:55

== Charts ==
Chart (1962)	Peak position
US Top LPs (Billboard)	3
US Cashbox	4

== Personnel ==
From the liner notes for the original album:

- Robert Mersey – arranger, conductor, producer
- Andy Williams - vocals

== Bibliography ==
- Whitburn, Joel (1985), Joel Whitburn's Top Pop Albums, 1955-1985, Record Research Inc., ISBN 0-89820-054-7
- Wiley, Mason; Bona, Damien (1996), Inside Oscar: The Unofficial History of the Academy Awards, Ballantine Books, ISBN 0-345-40053-4
- Williams, Andy (2009), Moon River and Me: A Memoir, Viking Penguin, ISBN 978-0-670-02117-8
- Larkin, Colin (2007), The Encyclopedia of Popular Music, Omnibus Press, ISBN 9-7818-4609-8567
- Hoffmann, Frank W (1988), The Cash box album charts, 1955-1974, Scarecrow Press, ISBN 0-810-82005-6
