= Love Story (Andy Williams studio album) =

Studio album by Andy Williams
- Released: February 3, 1971
- Recorded: 1970–1971
- Genre: Traditional pop; vocal pop; soft rock
- Length: 35:54
- Label: Columbia
- Producer: Dick Glasser

Andy Williams chronology
The Andy Williams Show (1970)	Love Story (1971)	Love Story (U.K.) (1971)

Alternate cover
- Home Lovin' Man (UK)

Singles from Love Story
- 1. "(Where Do I Begin?) Love Story" Released: January 15, 1971

Love Story is the twenty-seventh studio album by American pop singer Andy Williams that was released on February 3, 1971, by Columbia Records. This was another in his series of cover albums, but the title track, subtitled "Where Do I Begin", was the one song included that he originated.

The album made its first appearance on the Top LP's chart in the issue of Billboard magazine dated February 20, 1971, and remained there for 33 weeks, peaking at number three. it also debuted on the Cashbox albums chart in the issue dated February 20, 1971, and remained on the chart for 30 weeks, peaking at number four. One month later, on March 22, the album received Gold certification from the Recording Industry Association of America, and Platinum certification was awarded on November 21, 1986. For its release in the UK, the album was entitled Home Lovin' Man and did not include the title song from the original album (which was subtitled "Where Do I Begin?"), and this retitled edition entered the UK album chart on March 27, 1971, and spent two weeks at number one during its 26 weeks there. The title track from the original album was included on a UK LP that was also called Love Story but otherwise had a completely different set of songs, and that release entered the UK album chart on July 31 of that year and reached number 11 over the course of 11 weeks.

The first single from the original Love Story album was, in fact, "(Where Do I Begin) Love Story", which entered the Billboard Hot 100 in the issue of the magazine dated February 6, 1971, and stayed on the chart for 13 weeks, eventually peaking at number nine. The song also entered the magazine's list of the 40 most popular Easy Listening songs of the week in that same issue for its first of 15 weeks, later spending four weeks at number one and tying his previous record there, which was set by "Can't Get Used to Losing You" in 1963. Its lifespan on the UK singles chart began on March 20 of that same year and lasted 18 weeks, during which time it reached number four. The first single from the Home Lovin' Man LP was that album's title track, which began a seven-week run to number 10 and back on the Easy Listening chart in the US on October 24, 1970. Although it did not make the pop chart stateside, it did enter the UK singles chart on November 21, 1970, and got as high as number seven during its 12 weeks there.

The original Love Story album was released on compact disc by Columbia Records in 1988. A Columbia 3-CD box set including this album along with Andy Williams' Greatest Hits and Andy Williams' Greatest Hits Vol. 2 was released on August 12, 1997.

== Reception ==
Professional ratings
Review scores
Source	Rating
Allmusic	3/5 stars
Billboard	Spotlight Pick
The Encyclopedia of Popular Music	3/5 stars

Shawn M. Haney of Allmusic gave the album an enthusiastic review. "This is a precious feast to enjoy of delightful '70s love songs, sung and performed with sincerity by beloved pop singer talent Andy Williams." He had especially high praise for the vocalist. "Williams gives all of his soul and heart to pull off some stirring renditions of the amiable type to the kind listener." He also appreciated the production team. "Dick Glasser gives much of his time as producer in finding Andy Williams's unique sound, with Artie Butler and Dick Hazard playing a splendid role in the arrangements." He adds, "A wistful breath of fresh air away from the takeover of entertainers Frank Sinatra and Neil Diamond, the record is a pleasant listening experience for those who appreciate romantic ballads and melancholy orchestra background music. This collection shows just how easy it came to cover love ballads and pop hits in the '70s, giving Williams and his dazzling entertainer style voice the right time to shine during his days of stardom. So turn your lights down low and get with the one you share dreams with, and be prepared to feel the love."

Billboard magazine summed up their opinion in a capsule review that said, "A nifty assortment and beautifully done."

Cashbox notes Williams "delivers interesting performances of "George Harrison's My Sweet Lord", Joe South's Rose Garden", "James Taylor's "Fire and Rain" and Elton John's "Your Song"

In its Album Pick of the Week section, Record World said Williams "sings now generation songs for all generations on this new package, pegged onto Francis Lai's "Love Story Theme" festooned with a Carl Sigman lyric.".

== Track listing ==
=== Side one ===
1. "(Where Do I Begin) Love Story" (Francis Lai, Carl Sigman) – 3:10
2. "Your Song" (Elton John, Bernie Taupin) – 3:27
3. "For the Good Times" (Kris Kristofferson) – 3:37
4. "Something" (George Harrison) – 3:01
5. "It's Impossible" (Armando Manzanero, Sid Wayne) – 2:47
6. "We've Only Just Begun" (Roger Nichols, Paul Williams) – 3:15

=== Side two ===
1. "I Think I Love You" (Tony Romeo) – 2:42
2. "Candida" (Irwin Levine, Toni Wine) – 3:38
3. "Fire and Rain" (James Taylor) – 3:36
4. "Rose Garden" (Joe South) – 2:31
5. "My Sweet Lord" (George Harrison) – 4:14

For the Home Lovin' Man album in the UK, "(Where Do I Begin) Love Story" was replaced with the title track, but the remaining 10 songs followed the same order listed.

== Charts ==
Chart (1971)	Peak position
Australia (Kent Music Report)	26
United Kingdom (Official Charts Company)	1

== Personnel ==
From the liner notes for the original album:

- Andy Williams - vocals
- Dick Glasser - producer
- Artie Butler - arranger (except as noted)
- Dick Hazard - arranger ("(Where Do I Begin?) Love Story")
- Peter Romano - engineer
- Rafael O. Valentin - engineer
- Anne Blackford - cover design
- Guy Webster - cover photos

== Bibliography ==
- O'Neil, Thomas (1999), The Grammys, Perigree Books, ISBN 0-399-52477-0
- Whitburn, Joel (1993), Joel Whitburn's Top Adult Contemporary, 1961-1993, Record Research Inc., ISBN 0-89820-099-7
- Whitburn, Joel (2002), Joel Whitburn's Top Country Singles, 1944-2001, Record Research Inc., ISBN 0-89820-151-9
- Whitburn, Joel (2009), Joel Whitburn's Top Pop Singles, 1955-2008, Record Research Inc., ISBN 978-0-89820-180-2
- Whitburn, Joel (2010), Joel Whitburn Presents Top Pop Albums, Seventh Edition, Record Research Inc., ISBN 978-0-89820-183-3
