= (Where Do I Begin?) Love Story =

Song composed by Francis Lai; lyrics by Carl Sigman

Single by Andy Williams

from the album Love Story
- B-side: "Something"
- Released: January 15, 1971
- Recorded: December 17, 1970
- Genre: Easy listening
- Length: 3:10
- Label: Columbia 4-45317
- Songwriters: Francis Lai, Carl Sigman
- Producer: Dick Glasser

Andy Williams singles chronology
| "Home Lovin' Man" (1970) | "(Where Do I Begin?) Love Story" (1971) | "A Song for You" (1971) |

"Theme from Love Story"

Single by Henry Mancini

from the album Mancini Plays the Theme from Love Story
- B-side: "Phone Call to the Past"
- Released: December 1970
- Genre: Easy listening
- Length: 2:55
- Label: RCA Victor 47-9927
- Songwriters: Francis Lai, Carl Sigman
- Producer: Joe Reisman

Henry Mancini singles chronology
| "Darling Lili" (1970) | "Theme from Love Story" (1970) | "Theme from Cade's County" (1971) |

"(Where Do I Begin?) Love Story" is a popular song published in 1970, with music by Francis Lai and lyrics by Carl Sigman. The song was first introduced as an instrumental theme in the 1970 film Love Story after the film's distributor, Paramount Pictures, rejected the first set of lyrics that were written. Andy Williams eventually recorded the new lyrics and took the song to number nine on Billboard magazine's Hot 100 and number one on their Easy Listening chart.

== History ==
Francis Lai wrote the score for Love Story, and the company that published the music for Paramount felt that the track heard over the opening and closing credits, which was titled "Theme from Love Story", needed lyrics. Michael Sigman, son of lyricist Carl Sigman, recalled that his father was asked to provide the words and received "a synopsis of the script and the lead sheet of the music. The story was schmaltzy, but the music inspired words that expressed the sadness beneath the schmaltz." The initial set of lyrics his father wrote mirrored the storyline of the film from the perspective of the male protagonist, who describes a woman who enters his life ("So Jenny came") and then "suddenly was gone." Paramount executive Robert Evans "thought the lyric was a 'downer.' Further, he couldn't abide the phrase 'Jenny came,' believing it too sexually suggestive for a mainstream audience. He demanded a rewrite," and this upset Carl. "At first, justifiably proud of the fine lyric he crafted, he was angry and felt like refusing to do a rewrite. But the next day he cooled off and, pacing around his living room, said to his wife, 'Where do I begin?' and the new lyric was launched."

The recording of "Theme from Love Story" by Henry Mancini was released as a single. It made its debut on Billboard's Easy Listening chart in the issue of the magazine dated December 19. Two versions of "(Where Do I Begin?) Love Story"—one by Williams and one by Tony Bennett—were released on January 15, 1971. An article in the magazine's January 23 issue tried to explain the gap between releases of the instrumental and vocal versions as intentional. The logic behind the decision was that "only the instrumental version should hit the market before the picture's release, and that the vocal version should be held up until several weeks after the film's release so that 'the theme and the image of Love Story would be implanted in the audience's mind.'"

Williams re-recorded a disco version of the song, retitled "Love Story (Where Do I Begin)", in 1979; it was produced by Bob Esty and engineered by Larry Emerine. Esty had worked on disco records for the Beach Boys ("Here Comes the Night") and Cher ("Take Me Home") that same year. Esty said someone had suggested to him about working with Williams, who he admired. He laid a guide vocal where he attempted to emulate Williams' vocal phrasing, which Williams sang over. Released on April 27, 1979, the twelve-inch single of "Love Story (Where Do I Begin)" included two iterations of the song, a "long version" totalling 9:45, and a "short version" totalling 7:25. It was issued to celebrate William's 25 years in the music business, and coincided with other long-term acts, such as Ethel Merman, Engelbert Humperdinck and Barbra Streisand, releasing disco records. Barry Lederer of Billboard wrote that the introduction section, which ran for 2:05 in length, was "exciting with driving percussion and guitar movements." He criticized its rhythm portion for being "not enough. Both the lyrics and Williams don't seem to lend themselves to disco."

== Chart success ==
The Mancini version spent two of its 16 weeks on the Easy Listening chart at number two and also began a run of 11 weeks on the Billboard Hot 100 in the January 16 issue, during which time it got as high as number 13. The track that Francis Lai and his orchestra recorded for the film first charted on the Hot 100 in the January 31 issue and made it to number 31 over the course of nine weeks. It reached number 21 on the Easy Listening chart during its five weeks there that began in the February 6 issue.

The Williams version of "(Where Do I Begin?) Love Story" also debuted in the February 6 issue on both the Hot 100 and Easy Listening charts, while the Bennett version only managed to "bubble under" the Hot 100 for five weeks that began in the February 13 issue and eked out a peak position at number 114. Williams reached number nine on the Hot 100 during a 13-week stay and enjoyed four of his 15 weeks on the Easy Listening chart at number one. Roy Clark entered the Country singles chart with his rendition six weeks later, on March 27, and made it to number 74 during his two weeks there. (The flip side of Clark's single was his guitar rendition of the "Theme from Love Story" that also appeared on his 1973 album Superpicker.)

In the UK Williams began a run of 18 weeks on March 20 leading to a number four showing. His competition on the UK singles chart came from Shirley Bassey, who debuted her rendition of the song on March 27 and made it to number 34 during a nine-week run.

A pop version of "(Where Do I Begin?) Love Story" by Nino Tempo & April Stevens went by the title "Love Story" and "bubbled under" the Hot 100 to number 113 during its three weeks on the chart in December 1972. It did, however, reach the top five in the Dutch Top 40.

== Chart statistics ==
=== "Theme from Love Story" ===
==== Mancini version ====
| Chart | Peak position |
|---|---|
| US Billboard Hot 100 | 13 |
| US Billboard Adult Contemporary | 2 |

==== Lai version ====
| Chart | Peak position |
|---|---|
| Australia (Kent Music Report) | 17 |
| US Billboard Hot 100 | 31 |
| US Billboard Adult Contemporary | 21 |

=== "(Where Do I Begin?) Love Story" ===
==== Williams version ====
| Chart | Peak position |
|---|---|
| New Zealand (Listener) | 20 |
| US Billboard Hot 100 | 9 |
| US Billboard Adult Contemporary | 1 |
| UK Singles Chart | 4 |

==== Bennett version ====
| Chart | Peak position |
|---|---|
| US Bubbling Under Hot 100 Singles | 114 |

==== Bassey version ====
| Chart | Peak position |
|---|---|
| UK Singles Chart | 34 |

==== Clark version ====
| Chart | Peak position |
|---|---|
| US Country | 74 |

==== Tempo & Stevens version ====
| Chart | Peak position |
|---|---|
| Netherlands (Dutch Top 40) | 5 |
| US Bubbling Under Hot 100 Singles | 113 |

== Sales ==
Sales for Andy Williams' version of "(Where Do I Begin?) Love Story"
| Region | Certification | Certified units/sales |
|---|---|---|
| Japan | — | 600,000 |

== Notable cover versions ==
The song has been covered by many artists, including as an instrumental theme. The most notable are the versions by Andy Williams and Tony Bennett. In his AllMusic review of the 1971 Johnny Mathis album Love Story, Joe Viglione wrote, "His rendition of '(Where Do I Begin) Love Story' is riveting, a sweeping and majestic piece to lead off the record, and not the usual Jack Gold musical movement, but more pronounced and determined."

== See also ==
- List of number-one adult contemporary singles of 1971 (U.S.)

== Bibliography ==
- Arena, James (2016). Legends of Disco: Forty Stars Discuss Their Careers. Jefferson, North Carolina: McFarland & Company. ISBN 9781476664965.
- Green, Paul (April 14, 1979). "Everyone's Jumping on Disco Bandwagon". Billboard. Vol. 91, no. 15. ISSN 0006-2510.
- Lederer, Barry (April 28, 1979). "Disco Mix". Billboard. Vol. 91, no. 17. ISSN 0006-2510.
- Simmons, Sylvie (April 15, 1979). "Rock Beat". Toledo Blade. OCLC 12962717.
- Whitburn, Joel (2002), Joel Whitburn's Top Country Singles, 1944-2001, Record Research Inc., ISBN 0898201519
- Whitburn, Joel (2007), Joel Whitburn Presents Billboard Top Adult Songs, 1961-2006, Record Research Inc., ISBN 978-0898201697
- Whitburn, Joel (2009), Joel Whitburn's Top Pop Singles, 1955-2008, Record Research Inc., ISBN 978-0898201802
