= Love, Andy =

Studio album by Andy Williams
- Released: October 16, 1967
- Recorded: 1967
- Genres: AM pop; traditional pop; pop/rock
- Length: 32:54
- Label: Columbia
- Producer: Nick DeCaro

Andy Williams chronology
Born Free (1967)	Love, Andy (1967)	Honey (1968)

Singles from Love, Andy
- 1. "Holly" Released: October 5, 1967; 2. "Can't Take My Eyes Off You" Released: March 1, 1968

Love, Andy is the twenty-first studio album by American pop singer Andy Williams, released on October 16, 1967, by Columbia Records to coincide with the NBC special of the same name, which aired on November 6. The LP had a mix of covers of old and recent hits that included two songs from the 1940s that also had chart success in 1966 via Chris Montez: "The More I See You" and "There Will Never Be Another You".

The album debuted on Billboard magazine's Top LP's chart in the issue dated November 18, 1967, and remained there for 36 weeks, peaking at number eight. On the Cashbox albums chart, it debuted in the issue dated November 11, 1967, and remained on the chart for 21 weeks, peaking at number 12. It entered the UK albums chart in May 1968 and spent one week at number one over the course of 22 weeks. The Recording Industry Association of America awarded the album with a Gold certification on May 14, 1968.

In the US, the single released from the album, "Holly", first appeared on the Easy Listening chart in the issue of Billboard dated October 28, 1967, and peaked at number four during a 16-week stay. The song also began to "bubble under" the Hot 100 in the issue dated November 18, 1967, and eventually reached number 113. In the UK the song chosen as the single for release was a cover of Frankie Valli's "Can't Take My Eyes off You", and it entered the singles chart there for the week of March 16, 1968, stayed around for 18 weeks, peaking at number five. Williams revisited the song in 2002 as a duet with Denise Van Outen that reached number 23 in the UK.

Love Andy was released on compact disc as one of two albums on one CD by Sony Music Distribution in 1995, along with Williams's 1963 Columbia album, Days of Wine and Roses and Other TV Requests (under its UK title, Can't Get Used to Losing You and Other Requests). It was later released as one of two albums on one CD by Collectables Records on March 23, 1999, paired this time with Williams's 1967 Columbia release, Born Free. In 2001, the album was included in a box set entitled Classic Album Collection, Vol. 1, containing 17 of his studio albums and three compilations.

== Reception ==
Professional ratings
Review scores
Source	Rating
AllMusic	3/5 stars
The Encyclopedia of Popular Music	4/5 stars

AllMusic's William Ruhlmann described the current stage of the Williams oeuvre: "The singer had edged more toward contemporary sounds on his previous release, the previous spring's Born Free, bringing in a rock rhythm section and sticking to current material. Love, Andy edged back a bit, focusing more on string arrangements." He found this combination of songs to be "a balanced collection, not unlike a variety show on record made by an artist mindful of trying to appeal to the widest audience possible."

Billboard said that "Williams is in fine fettle as he plies romance with some topflight ballads of pop and standard character."

Variety noted that "Williams does his usual professional job on such numbers as 'Something Stupid', 'The Look of Love', 'Can't Take My Eyes Off You', 'Kisses Sweeter Than Wine', 'Holly', 'When I Look In Your Eyes', 'There Will Never Be Another You', and "God Only Knows" Record World described the album as "marvelous".

== Track listing ==
=== Side one ===
1. "Somethin' Stupid" (C. Carson Parks) – 2:59
2. "Watch What Happens" from The Umbrellas of Cherbourg (Norman Gimbel, Michel Legrand) – 2:27
3. "The Look of Love" from Casino Royale (Burt Bacharach, Hal David) – 2:55
4. "What Now, My Love?" (Gilbert Bécaud, Pierre Delanoë, Carl Sigman) – 2:05
5. "Can't Take My Eyes off You" (Bob Crewe, Bob Gaudio) – 3:15
6. "Kisses Sweeter Than Wine" (Paul Campbell, Joel Newman) – 2:52

=== Side two ===
1. "Holly" (Craig Vincent Smith) – 2:25
2. "When I Look in Your Eyes" from Doctor Dolittle (Leslie Bricusse) – 3:22
3. "The More I See You" from Diamond Horseshoe (Mack Gordon, Harry Warren) – 2:25
4. "There Will Never Be Another You" from Iceland (Mack Gordon, Harry Warren) – 2:53
5. "God Only Knows" (Tony Asher, Brian Wilson) – 2:52

== Charts ==
Chart (1967)	Peak position
US Billboard Top LP's	4
US Cashbox Albums Chart	12

Chart (1968)	Peak position
UK Albums Chart	1

=== Singles ===
Year	Title	U.S. Hot 100	U.S. AC	UK singles
1967	"Holly"	113	4	—
1968	"Can't Take My Eyes Off You"	—	—	5

== Personnel ==
From the liner notes for the original album:

- Andy Williams – vocals
- Nick DeCaro – arranger, producer
- Eddie Karam – conductor
- Lincoln Mayorga – piano ("God Only Knows")
- Rafael O. Valentin – recording engineer
- Frank Laico – recording engineer
- Peter Whorf – photographer

== Bibliography ==
- Whitburn, Joel (1993), Joel Whitburn's Top Adult Contemporary, 1961-1993, Record Research Inc., ISBN 0-89820-099-7
- Whitburn, Joel (2009), Joel Whitburn's Top Pop Singles, 1955-2008, Record Research Inc., ISBN 0-89820-180-2
- Whitburn, Joel (2010), Joel Whitburn Presents Top Pop Albums, Seventh Edition, Record Research Inc., ISBN 0-89820-183-7
