= 40 Christmas Classics =

Compilation album by Andy Williams
- Released: October 31, 2014
- Recorded: 1963–1974
- Genre: Christmas
- Length: 1:56:30
- Label: Sony Music Entertainment

Andy Williams chronology
The Classic Christmas Album (2013)	40 Christmas Classics (2014)	Gold (2020)

40 Christmas Classics is a digital compilation album by American pop singer Andy Williams that was released on October 31, 2014, and includes all of the songs from his first three solo holiday LPs, The Andy Williams Christmas Album, Merry Christmas, and Christmas Present. Three tracks not originally appearing on holiday albums by Williams are also included: "My Sweet Lord" from his 1971 album Love Story, "Amazing Grace" from his 1972 album Alone Again (Naturally), and the Latin Catholic Prayer version of Franz Schubert's "Ave Maria", which Williams recorded in honor of Senator Robert F. Kennedy just days after his funeral in 1968.

The album appeared on Billboard magazine's lists of the top pop albums and top holiday albums in 2018 and 2019.

== Track listing ==
=== Disc one ===
1. "The Christmas Song (Chestnuts Roasting on an Open Fire)" (Mel Tormé, Robert Wells) – 2:34
2. "Sweet Little Jesus Boy" (Robert MacGimsey) – 3:17
3. "O Holy Night" (Adolphe Adam, John Sullivan Dwight) – 3:24
4. "Silent Night, Holy Night" (Franz Xaver Gruber, Joseph Mohr) – 2:15
5. "The Little Drummer Boy" (Katherine K. Davis, Henry Onorati, Harry Simeone) – 2:17
6. "Away in a Manger" (Traditional) – 2:51
7. "Kay Thompson's Jingle Bells" (James Pierpont, Kay Thompson) – 2:06
8. "Happy Holiday/The Holiday Season" (Irving Berlin/Kay Thompson) – 2:38
9. "It's the Most Wonderful Time of the Year" (Edward Pola, George Wyle) – 2:33
10. "A Song and a Christmas Tree (The Twelve Days of Christmas)" (Traditional) – 3:57
11. "The First Noël" (Traditional) – 3:08
12. "White Christmas" (Irving Berlin) – 2:29
13. "Have Yourself a Merry Little Christmas" from Meet Me in St. Louis (Ralph Blane, Hugh Martin) – 3:27
14. "Winter Wonderland" (Felix Bernard, Richard B. Smith) – 2:14
15. "Silver Bells" from The Lemon Drop Kid (Ray Evans, Jay Livingston) – 3:12
16. "Mary's Little Boy Child" (Jester Hairston) – 3:57
17. "Some Children See Him" (Alfred Burt, Wihla Hutson) – 3:26
18. "Do You Hear What I Hear?" (Gloria Shayne Baker, Noël Regney) – 2:55
19. "Christmas Holiday" (Craig Vincent Smith) – 1:56
20. "Sleigh Ride" (Leroy Anderson, Mitchell Parish) – 2:11

=== Disc two ===
1. "Let It Snow! Let It Snow! Let It Snow!" (Sammy Cahn, Jule Styne) – 2:20
2. "My Favorite Things" from The Sound of Music (Oscar Hammerstein II, Richard Rodgers) – 2:29
3. "Little Altar Boy" (Howlett Peter Smith) – 4:59
4. "The Bells of St. Mary's" (A. Emmett Adams, Douglas Furber) – 2:38
5. "Christmas Present" (Larry H. Brown, Keats Tyler) – 2:30
6. "Joy To The World" (Lowell Mason, Isaac Watts) – 2:52
7. "O Little Town of Bethlehem" (Phillip Brooks, Lewis H. Redner) – 2:32
8. "Ring Christmas Bells" (Mykola Dmytrovych Leontovych, Peter Wilhousky, Minna Louise Hohman) – 1:52
9. "It Came Upon A Midnight Clear" (Edmund Hamilton Sears, Richard Storrs Willis) – 3:12
10. "Ave Maria" (Franz Schubert) – 4:34
11. "O Come All Ye Faithful" (Frederick Oakeley, John Francis Wade) – 2:35
12. "Angels We Have Heard On High" (traditional) – 2:32
13. "Hark! The Herald Angels Sing" (Felix Mendelssohn, Charles Wesley) – 2:39
14. "Ave Maria" (Johann Sebastian Bach, Charles Gounod) – 3:05
15. "What Child Is This" (William Chatterton Dix) – 2:31
16. "I Heard the Bells on Christmas Day" (John Baptiste Calkin, Henry Wadsworth Longfellow) – 2:47
17. "The Lord's Prayer" (Albert Hay Malotte) – 2:40
18. "Ave Maria" (Franz Schubert) – 4:55
19. "Amazing Grace" (John Newton) – 3:27
20. "My Sweet Lord" (George Harrison) – 4:14

== Charts ==
=== Billboard 200 ===
Holiday season	Peak position
2018	167
2019	158

=== Billboard Top Holiday Albums ===
Holiday season	Peak position
2018	40
2019	44
