= Personal Christmas Collection =

Compilation album by Andy Williams
- Released: 1994
- Recorded: 1963–1974
- Genre: Christmas
- Length: 37:42
- Label: Columbia Records

Andy Williams chronology
The New Andy Williams Christmas Album (1994)	Personal Christmas Collection (1994)	16 Most Requested Songs: Encore! (1995)

Professional ratings
Review scores
Source	Rating
AllMusic	3/5 stars

Personal Christmas Collection is a compilation album by American pop singer Andy Williams that was released by Columbia Records in 1994 and includes selections from his first three solo holiday LPs, The Andy Williams Christmas Album, Merry Christmas, and Christmas Present.

The album made holiday season appearances on Billboard magazine's album chart from 2012 to 2016, the year it had its all-time peak at number 115.

== Track listing ==
1. "It's the Most Wonderful Time of the Year" (Edward Pola, George Wyle) – 2:33
2. "My Favorite Things" from The Sound of Music (Oscar Hammerstein II, Richard Rodgers) – 2:29
3. "The Christmas Song (Chestnuts Roasting on an Open Fire)" (Mel Tormé, Robert Wells) – 2:34
4. "The Bells of St. Mary's" (A. Emmett Adams, Douglas Furber) – 2:38
5. "Christmas Present" (Larry H. Brown, Keats Tyler) – 2:30
6. "Winter Wonderland" (Felix Bernard, Richard B. Smith) – 2:14
7. "The First Noël" (traditional) – 3:08
8. "O Come All Ye Faithful" (Frederick Oakeley, John Francis Wade) – 2:35
9. "Sleigh Ride" (Leroy Anderson, Mitchell Parish) – 2:11
10. "Silver Bells" from The Lemon Drop Kid (Ray Evans, Jay Livingston) – 3:12
11. "Hark! The Herald Angels Sing" (Felix Mendelssohn, Charles Wesley) – 2:39
12. "Ring Christmas Bells"^{[A]} (Mykola Dmytrovych Leontovych, Peter Wilhousky, Minna Louise Hohman) – 1:52
13. "Silent Night" (Franz Xaver Gruber, Joseph Mohr) – 2:15
14. "White Christmas" (Irving Berlin) – 2:29
15. "Happy Holiday/The Holiday Season" (Irving Berlin/Kay Thompson) – 2:38
- ^{A} This track originated on the 1974 album Christmas Present. The back cover and label of the original vinyl release of that album list the title of this track as "Christmas Bells", and the label gives songwriting credit to Harry Filler and Leonard Schroeder, who did write a different song called "Christmas Bells" that was recorded by Patti Page for her 1951 album Christmas with Patti Page.

== Charts ==
=== Billboard 200 ===
Holiday season	Peak position
2012	139
2013	131
2014	161
2015	149
2016	115
