= The New Andy Williams Christmas Album =

Live album by Andy Williams
- Released: May 3, 1994
- Recorded: 1993 at Moon River Theater, Branson, MO
- Genre: Christmas; traditional pop; vocal pop
- Length: 48:10
- Label: LaserLight
- Producer: Ralph Jungheim

Andy Williams chronology
Greatest Hits (1994)	The New Andy Williams Christmas Album (1994)	Personal Christmas Collection (1994)

Professional ratings
Review scores
Source	Rating
Allmusic	3/5 stars

The New Andy Williams Christmas Album is a live Christmas album by American pop singer Andy Williams that was digitally recorded live in concert at the Andy Williams Moon River Theatre in Branson, Missouri in 1993 and released by the LaserLight division of Delta Music Inc. in 1994. It includes performances of songs that he had previously recorded for his four solo holiday releases as well as a new spoken word track ("Jimmy Bishop Christmas Column") that briefly summarizes the life of Jesus Christ.

The album marked Williams's first appearance on the Billboard 200 album chart in 20 years when it debuted there in December 1994 and reached number 137. It also peaked at number 40 that year on Billboard's Christmas Albums chart and made appearances both there and on the Top Pop Catalog Albums chart in 1995 and 1996.

The concert was also broadcast on PBS television stations in 1993 and on October 4, 1994, became available in its entirety on home video in the VHS format under the title The Andy Williams Christmas Show. This 78-minute presentation was released on DVD in 1999.

== Track listing ==
1. "It's the Most Wonderful Time of the Year" (Edward Pola, George Wyle) – 3:06
2. "Christmas Needs Love to Be Christmas" (Steven McClintock, Tim James) – 3:09
3. "Sleigh Ride" (Mitchell Parish, Leroy Anderson) – 2:19
4. "I'll Be Home for Christmas" (Kim Gannon, Walter Kent, Buck Ram) – 2:58
5. "Blue Christmas" (Billy Hayes, Jay Johnson) – 3:07
6. "I Saw Mommy Kissing Santa Claus" (Tommie Connor) – 3:17
7. "Kay Thompson's Jingle Bells" (James Pierpont, Kay Thompson) – 2:25
8. "Let It Snow! Let It Snow! Let It Snow!" (Sammy Cahn, Jule Styne) – 2:09
9. "The Christmas Song (Chestnuts Roasting On An Open Fire)" (Mel Tormé, Robert Wells) – 3:57
10. "White Christmas" with The Osmond Brothers and Lorrie Morgan (Irving Berlin) – 3:20
11. Medley – 9:51
  a. "Angels We Have Heard On High" (traditional)
  b. "Joy To The World" (Lowell Mason, Isaac Watts)
  c. "O Come All Ye Faithful" (Frederick Oakeley, John Francis Wade)
  d. "The Bells of St. Mary's" (A. Emmett Adams, Douglas Furber)
12. "Silent Night" (Franz Xaver Gruber; Joseph Mohr) – 1:13
13. "Jimmy Bishop Christmas Column" (Jim Bishop) – 2:17
14. "O Holy Night" (Adolphe Adam, John Sullivan Dwight) – 3:23
15. "May Each Day" (Mort Green, Wyle) – 1:40

== Billboard album chart positions ==
Year	Billboard 200	Christmas Albums	Top Pop Catalog Albums
1994	137	40	-
1995	-	38	41
1996	-	31	32

== Personnel ==
From the liner notes for the original album:

- Andy Williams - vocals
- Alan Osmond - vocals ("White Christmas")
- Wayne Osmond - vocals ("White Christmas")
- Merrill Osmond - vocals ("White Christmas")
- Jay Osmond - vocals ("White Christmas")
- Lorrie Morgan - vocals ("White Christmas")
- Ralph Jungheim - producer
- Steve Colby - recording engineer, coproducer
- Garth "Gaff" Michaels - second engineer
- Steve Weinkam - stage engineer
- Dennis Hanlon - transportation captain
- Tennyson Flowers - theatre producer
- Bill Lightner - digital editing and mastering
- Michael Matousek - design

== Bibliography ==
- Werts, Diane (2006), Christmas on Television, Praeger Publishers Inc., ISBN 0-275-98331-5
- Whitburn, Joel (2004), Christmas in the Charts (1920-2004), Record Research Inc., ISBN 0-89820-161-6
