= Charles Oakeley =

Charles Oakeley may refer to:

- Sir Charles Oakeley, 1st Baronet (1751–1826), English administrator
- Sir Charles Oakeley, 2nd Baronet (1778–1829)
- Sir Charles Oakeley, 4th Baronet (1828–1915), English cricketer and officer in the Bengal Army
