= Helena Beatson =

Scottish artist (1762–1839)

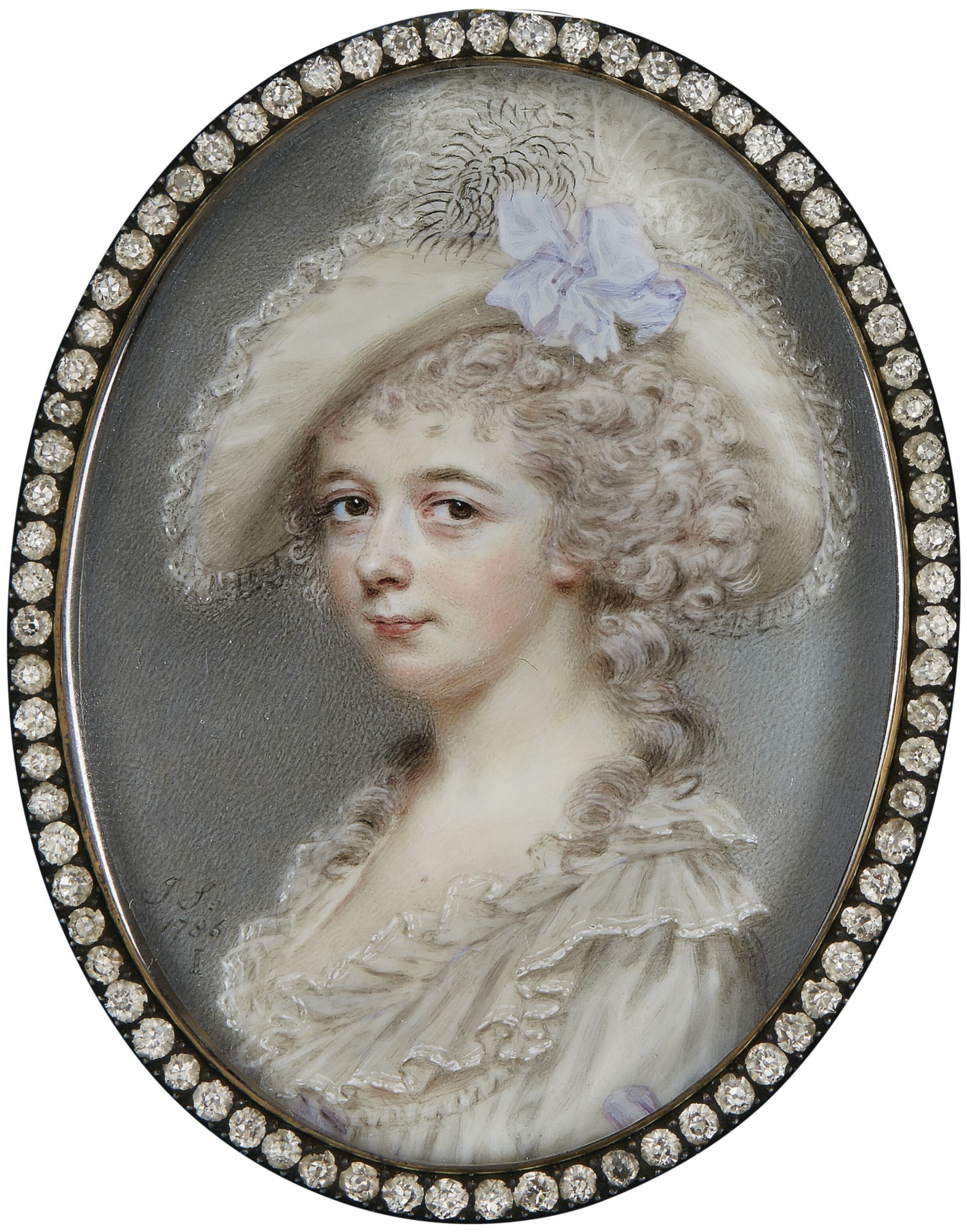
- Miniature by John Smart, 1786
- Born: 23 March 1762; Kilrie, Fife, Scotland
- Died: 19 February 1839 (aged 76)
- Occupation: Artist
- Spouse: Sir Charles Oakeley, 1st Baronet
- Children: 10, including Sir Charles Oakeley, 2nd Baronet, Sir Herbert Oakeley, 3rd Baronet, and Frederick Oakeley
- Relatives: Catherine Read (aunt); Sir Charles Oakeley, 4th Baronet (grandson); Herbert Oakeley (grandson)

Helena Beatson (1762–1839), also known as Lady Helena Oakeley, was an amateur pastellist from Scotland.

== Early life ==
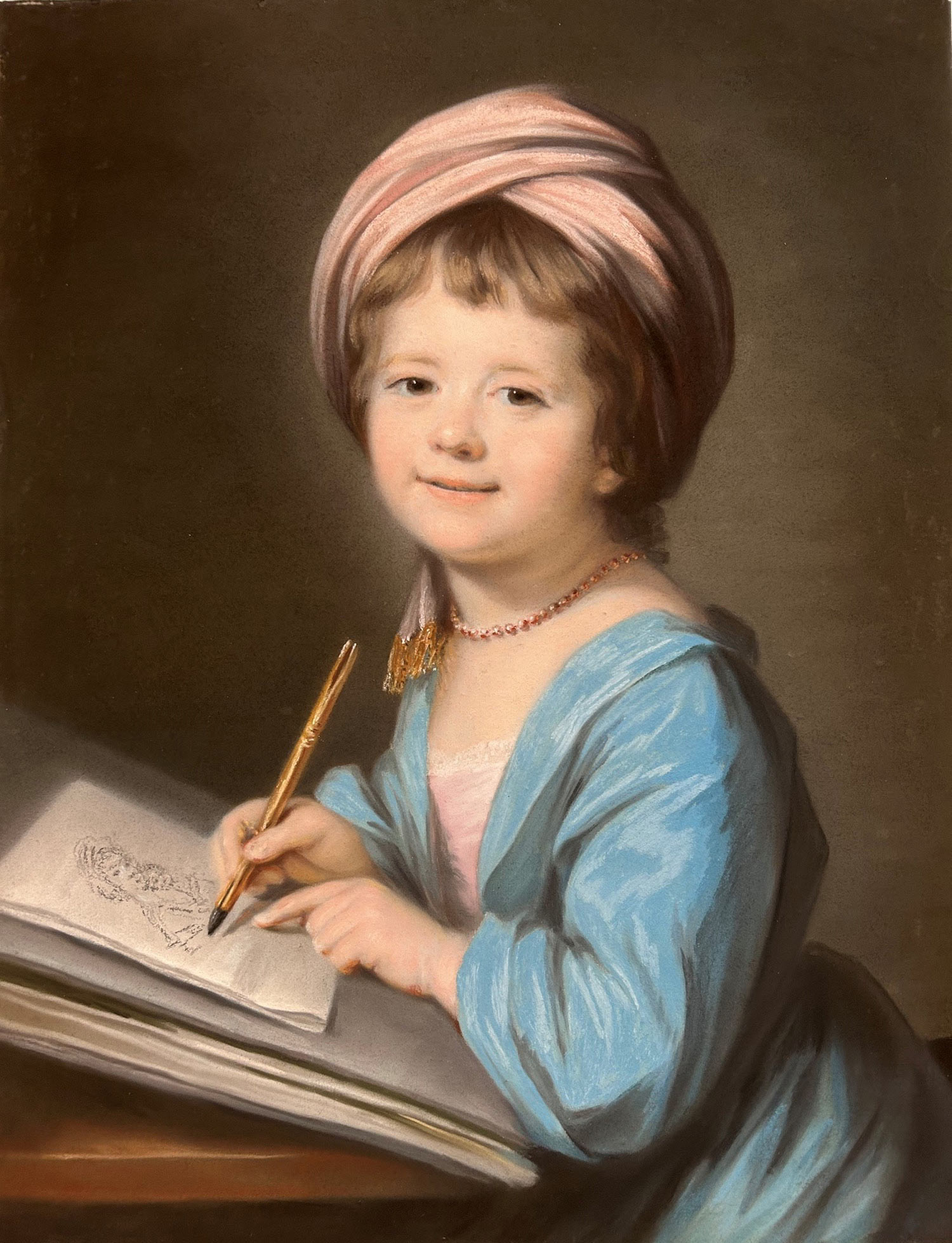
Helena Beatson drawing a picture, pastel portrait by her aunt Catherine Read, 1767 (Katrin Bellinger Collection)

Born in Kilrie, Fife, Helena Beatson was the daughter of writer Robert Beatson and niece of artist Catherine Read, who produced several portraits of her in addition to being her teacher. A child prodigy, she submitted, anonymously, a set of "sketches by a child of eight years old" to the Society of Artists in 1771; they were singled out for praise by Horace Walpole. Two drawings of gypsies and dancers were exhibited at the Royal Academy in 1774, in which year Fanny Burney visited her and her aunt and pronounced the child "a most astonishing genius, though never taught...a very wonderful girl".

== Adult years ==
Beatson was well-travelled, visiting Charleston, South Carolina in 1772 — a trip which attracted notice in the local Gazette — and travelling with Read to India a few years later. In 1777, while there, she married Sir Charles Oakeley, 1st Baronet, later governor of Madras. They had at least ten children together, likely fourteen, including Charles, the eldest, who inherited his father's title, and Frederick Oakeley, the youngest, who became a Catholic priest and author. She taught Frederick writing, geography, French, and drawing, and travelled with him for his health. After getting married, she only occasionally dabbled in art, painting at least one watercolour portrait of three of her children, and their Indian carers, while in India.

Her husband's tenure as governor of Madras ended in 1794, and they returned to England. He died in 1826, her eldest son died in 1829, and Lady Oakeley died in 1839, at the age of 76, at Lichfield Palace.

== Portraits ==
The National Portrait Gallery holds several portraits of Beatson as a child. The National Gallery of Ireland has a portrait sketch of Oakeley, made by John Smart.
