= Kelway =

Kelway is a surname. Notable people with the surname include:

- Joseph Kelway (c. 1702–1782), English organist
- Simon Kelway (died 1623), English politician
- Thomas Kelway (c. 1695–1744), English organist, brother of Joseph

== See also ==
- McKelway
