= The Classic Christmas Album (Andy Williams album) =

Compilation album by Andy Williams
- Released: October 8, 2013
- Recorded: 1963, 1965, 1974
- Genre: Christmas
- Length: 43:58
- Label: Sony Music Entertainment

Andy Williams chronology
The Very Best of Andy Williams (2009)	The Classic Christmas Album (2013)	40 Christmas Classics (2014)

Professional ratings
Review scores
Source	Rating
AllMusic	3/5 stars

The Classic Christmas Album is a compilation album by American pop singer Andy Williams that was released by Sony Music Entertainment on October 8, 2013, and includes selections from his first three solo holiday LPs, The Andy Williams Christmas Album, Merry Christmas, and Christmas Present.

The album reached number 181 on Billboard magazine's album chart in December 2013 and began a series of annual re-entries there in 2017 that included a number 23 showing in 2019.

== Track listing ==
1. "Joy To The World" (Lowell Mason, Isaac Watts) – 2:52
2. "Let It Snow! Let It Snow! Let It Snow!" (Sammy Cahn, Jule Styne) – 2:20
3. "The Christmas Song (Chestnuts Roasting on an Open Fire)" (Mel Tormé, Robert Wells) – 2:34
4. "Winter Wonderland" (Felix Bernard, Richard B. Smith) – 2:14
5. "Silent Night" (Franz Xaver Gruber, Joseph Mohr) – 2:15
6. "O Little Town of Bethlehem" (Phillips Brooks, Lewis H. Redner) – 2:32
7. "Have Yourself a Merry Little Christmas" from Meet Me in St. Louis (Ralph Blane, Hugh Martin) – 3:27
8. "The Little Drummer Boy" (Katherine K. Davis, Henry Onorati, Harry Simeone) – 2:17
9. "What Child Is This" (William Chatterton Dix) – 2:31
10. "Silver Bells" from The Lemon Drop Kid (Ray Evans, Jay Livingston) – 3:12
11. "Kay Thompson's Jingle Bells" (James Pierpont, Kay Thompson) – 2:06
12. "Angels We Have Heard On High" (traditional) – 2:32
13. "My Favorite Things" from The Sound of Music (Oscar Hammerstein II, Richard Rodgers) – 2:29
14. "O Holy Night" (Adolphe Adam, John Sullivan Dwight) – 3:24
15. "Ave Maria" (Franz Schubert) – 4:34
16. "It's the Most Wonderful Time of the Year" (Edward Pola, George Wyle) – 2:33

== Charts ==
=== Billboard 200 ===
Holiday season	Peak position
2013	181
2017	98
2018	27
2019	23
2020	30

Chart (2024)	Peak position
German Pop Albums (Offizielle Top 100)	12
