= University Music Society =

University Music Society may refer to:

- Edinburgh University Music Society
- Oxford University Music Society
- Sydney University Musical Society
- University Musical Society, University of Michigan
