= Oakeley baronets =

Title in the Baronetage of Great Britain

- Escutcheon of the Oakeley baronets of Shrewsbury
- Creation date: 1790
- Status: extant
- Motto: Non timeo sed caveo, I fear not, but am cautious

The Oakeley baronetcy, of Shrewsbury, is a title in the Baronetage of Great Britain. It was created on 5 June 1790 for the colonial administrator Charles Oakeley. He served as Governor of Madras from 1790 to 1794.

== Oakeley baronets, of Shrewsbury (1790) ==
- Sir Charles Oakeley, 1st Baronet (1751–1826)
- Sir Charles Oakeley, 2nd Baronet (1778–1829)
- Sir Herbert Oakeley, 3rd Baronet (1791–1845)
- Sir Charles William Atholl Oakeley, 4th Baronet (1828–1915)
- Sir Charles John Oakeley, 5th Baronet (1862–1938)
- Sir Charles Richard Andrew Oakeley, 6th Baronet (1900–1959)
- Sir (Edward) Atholl Oakeley, 7th Baronet (1900–1987)
- Sir John Digby Atholl Oakeley, 8th Baronet (1932–2016)
- Sir Robert John Atholl Oakeley, 9th Baronet (1963–)

The heir apparent to the baronetcy is William Robert Atholl Oakeley (b. 1995).

== Extended family ==
The English priest Frederick Oakeley was the sixth son of the 1st Baronet.

== Notes ==
Baronetage of Great Britain
Preceded by Buller baronets	Oakeley baronets of Shrewsbury; 5 June 1790	Succeeded by Orde baronets
