= EUM =

EUM may refer to:

- Eum (Korean name)
- Elisabeth University of Music, a Jesuit university in Japan
- Estados Unidos Mexicanos, the full name of Mexico in Spanish

== See also ==
- EUMS (disambiguation)
