= Greatest Hits (Andy Williams album) =

Live album by Andy Williams
- Released: March 5, 1994
- Recorded: 1994 at Moon River Theater, Branson, MO
- Genres: Easy listening, vocal pop
- Length: 48:10
- Label: LaserLight (Delta Music Inc.)
- Producer: Ralph Jungheim

Andy Williams chronology
The Best of Andy Williams (1992)	Greatest Hits (1994)	The New Andy Williams Christmas Album (1994)

Greatest Hits is a live album by American pop singer Andy Williams that was digitally recorded live in concert at the Andy Williams Moon River Theater in Branson, Missouri and released by the LaserLight division of Delta Music Inc. in 1994. It includes performances of songs that he had previously recorded during his time with the Cadence and Columbia labels as well as one he had never recorded before -- "L-O-V-E", which Nat King Cole took to number 81 pop and number 17 Easy Listening in Billboard magazine in 1964.

The concert was also broadcast on PBS television stations and on October 4, 1994, became available in its entirety on home video in the VHS format under the title Andy Williams in Concert at Branson. This 82-minute presentation was released on DVD in 2002.

== Track listing ==
1. Opening Medley – 7:11
  a. "L-O-V-E" (Bert Kaempfert, Milt Gabler)
  b. "Love Is Here to Stay" (George Gershwin, Ira Gershwin)
2. Movie Medley – 12:57
  a. "You Oughta Be in Pictures" (Instrumental) (Edward Heyman, Dana Suesse)
  b. "Call Me Irresponsible" (Sammy Cahn, Jimmy Van Heusen)
  c. "Days of Wine and Roses" (Johnny Mercer, Henry Mancini)
  d. "Charade" (Mercer, Mancini)
  e. "Theme from Love Story (Where Do I Begin)" (Carl Sigman, Francis Lai)
  f. "Speak Softly Love (Love Theme from The Godfather)" (Larry Kusik, Nino Rota)
3. "MacArthur Park" (Jimmy Webb) – 4:47
4. "Born Free" (John Barry, Don Black) – 2:06
5. 50s Medley – 7:43
  a. "Butterfly" (Bernie Lowe, Kal Mann)
  b. "Are You Sincere" (Wayne Walker)
  c. "I Like Your Kind of Love" (Melvin Endsley)
  d. "Lonely Street" (Carl Belew, Kenny Sowder, W.S. Stevenson)
  e. "In the Summertime" (Roger Miller)
6. "Canadian Sunset" (Norman Gimbel, Eddie Heywood) – 2:35
7. "Hawaiian Wedding Song" (Al Hoffman, Dick Manning, Charles E. King) – 2:50
8. "Can't Get Used to Losing You" (Jerome "Doc" Pomus, Mort Shuman) – 2:32
9. "Moon River" (Mercer, Mancini) – 3:26
10. "May Each Day" (Mort Green, George Wyle) – 2:03

== Personnel ==
- Andy Williams - vocals
- Ralph Jungheim - producer
- Steve Colby - recording engineer, coproducer
- Garth "Gaff" Michaels - second engineer
- Steve Weinkam - stage engineer
- Dennis Hanlon - transportation captain
- Tennyson Flowers - theatre producer
- Bill Lightner - digital editing and mastering
- Michael Matousek - design
