= The Best of Andy Williams =

The Best of Andy Williams may refer to:

- The Best of Andy Williams (1992 album)
- The Best of Andy Williams (1996 album)
