= Sir Charles Oakeley, 2nd Baronet =

Sir Charles Oakeley, 2nd Baronet (25 September 1778 – 30 June 1829) was the second Baronet in the Oakeley Baronetcy of Shrewsbury. He was the son of the first Baronet, also called Sir Charles Oakeley, and Helena Beatson (the niece of Scottish artist, Catherine Read).

Oakeley was born in Madras, India where his father was governor. He was the eldest of fourteen children, the youngest of which was Frederick Oakeley. He married Charlotte Francoise Augusta Gilberte Ramadier on 20 March 1820 and died in Huy, Netherlands (since 1830 in Belgium) in 1829. He fathered three daughters, the youngest of which was born after his death in February 1830.

Baronetage of Great Britain
Preceded by Charles Oakeley	Baronet (of Shrewsbury); 1826–1829	Succeeded by Herbert Oakeley
