= We Need a Little Christmas (disambiguation) =

"We Need a Little Christmas" is a popular Christmas song from the musical Mame.

We Need a Little Christmas may also refer to:

- We Need a Little Christmas (Pentatonix album), 2020
- We Need a Little Christmas (Andy Williams album), 1995
