= Kellway =

Kellway is a surname. Notable people with the surname include:

- Cedric Kellway (1892-1963), Australien diplomat
- Matthew Kellway (born 1964), Canadian politician

== See also ==
- Kelway
