= McKelway =

McKelway is a surname. Notable people with the surname include:

- Alexander McKelway (1866–1918), American clergyman, journalist, and activist
- Doug McKelway (born 1954), American television journalist
- St. Clair McKelway (1905–1980), American journalist and editor

== See also ==
- Kelway
