= We Need a Little Christmas (Andy Williams album) =

Studio album by Andy Williams
- Released: June 19, 1995
- Recorded: 1995
- Studio: Quad Studio, Nashville, Tennessee, Studio 3319, Nashville, Tennessee, Synchrosound Studios, Nashville, Tennessee, CMP Studio, Nashville, Tennessee, Joy Spring Farm Studio, Liepers Fork, Tennessee, Digital Domain Studio, Irvine, California, The Battery, Nashville, Tennessee
- Genre: Christmas; adult contemporary; vocal pop
- Length: 44:53
- Label: Unison Music
- Producer: Don Boyer

Andy Williams chronology
16 Most Requested Songs: Encore! (1995)	We Need a Little Christmas (1995)	The Best of Andy Williams (1996)

Professional ratings
Review scores
Source	Rating
AllMusic	2.5/5 stars

We Need a Little Christmas is the fifth Christmas album by American pop singer Andy Williams (and his forty-second studio album overall) that was released by Unison Music in 1995. It gives an adult contemporary treatment to songs that Williams had previously recorded for 1963's The Andy Williams Christmas Album ("Away In A Manger", "The Christmas Song (Chestnuts Roasting On An Open Fire)", "It's The Most Wonderful Time Of The Year", "Silent Night"), 1965's Merry Christmas ("Mary's Little Boy Child"), 1974's Christmas Present ("Angels We Have Heard On High", "Hark! The Herald Angels Sing", "I Heard the Bells on Christmas Day", "What Child Is This"), and 1990's I Still Believe in Santa Claus ("I'll Be Home for Christmas") and includes three songs that Williams had not recorded before. In a brief note on the back of the jewel case Williams writes, "These all-new recordings feature fresh, innovative arrangements of some of my favorite carols. I felt like I was singing them for the very first time."

The Recording Industry Association of America awarded the album Gold certification for sales of 500,000 units on February 2, 1998.

== Track listing ==
1. "Mary's Little Boy Child" (Jester Hairston) – 4:14
2. "I'll Be Home for Christmas" (Kim Gannon, Walter Kent, Buck Ram) – 3:21
3. "Up on the House Top" (Benjamin Hanby) – 3:08
4. "Away in a Manger" (traditional) – 3:01
5. "We Need a Little Christmas" (Jerry Herman) – 3:33
6. Angel Medley – 4:40
  a. "Angels We Have Heard On High" (traditional)
  b. "Hark! The Herald Angels Sing" (Felix Mendelssohn, Charles Wesley)
7. "The Christmas Song (Chestnuts Roasting on an Open Fire)" (Mel Tormé, Robert Wells) – 4:02
8. "It's the Most Wonderful Time of the Year" (Edward Pola, George Wyle) – 3:34
9. "Jolly Old St. Nicholas" (traditional) – 2:33
10. "I Heard the Bells on Christmas Day" (John Baptiste Calkin, Henry Wadsworth Longfellow) – 3:08
11. "What Child Is This" (William Chatterton Dix) – 4:10
12. "Silent Night" (Franz Xaver Gruber; Joseph Mohr) – 5:29

== Personnel ==
From the liner notes for the original album:

Production

- Don Boyer - producer; background vocal arrangement/children's vocal arrangement (track 6)
- Pat Coil - arranger (tracks 5, 7, 9, 10)
- John Darnall - lead vocal engineer (except as noted)
- Jim Falzone - editor
- Mike Frazier - lead vocal engineer (tracks 1, 5, 9); additional engineering
- Tommy Greer - arranger (track 12)
- Don Hart - string arrangement/conductor (tracks 5, 7, 11, 12), brass arrangement/conductor (tracks 1, 5, 10), string conductor (tracks 1, 4, 10)
- Peter Jacobs - children's vocal arrangement/conductor (tracks 5, 6, 8)
- David Jahnsen - additional engineering
- John Jaszcz - mixing (tracks 5, 6, 8)
- Sandy Jenkins - additional engineering
- Pete Martinez - additional engineering
- Blair Masters - arranger (tracks 2, 8, 11)
- John Mayfield - string engineer (except as noted)
- Gary Oldenbroek - associate producer
- Dennis Patton - arranger (tracks 1, 3, 4, 6)
- Daryl Roudebush - additional engineering
- Dan Rudin - mixing (except as noted)
- Roger Ryan - adult choir contractor/conductor (track 6)
- Chris Sabold - string engineer (tracks 2, 6, 8)
- Rich Schirmer - additional engineering
- David Schober - additional engineering
- Shaun Shankel - additional engineering
- J. Daniel Smith - background vocal arrangement (track 6), string arrangement/conductor (tracks 2, 6, 8)
- Bert Stevens - additional engineering
- Hank Williams - mastering
- Dave Williamson - background vocal arrangement/conductor (track 3), string arrangement (track 1)
- Don Wyrtzen - string arrangement (tracks 4, 10)

Musicians

- Mark Baldwin - guitar (track 11)
- Eric Darken - percussion (tracks 2, 5, 7, 8, 10, 12); snare (track 2)
- Gota Yashiki's Groove Activator - drum loop (track 3)
- Barry Green - trombone
- Mike Haynes - trumpet and flugelhorn
- Tom Hemby - guitar (track 10)
- Jim Hoke - harmonica (track 2)
- Sam Levine - alto saxophone (track 3), saxophone
- Carol McClure - harp (except tracks 2, 6, 8)
- Craig Nelson - bass (tracks 6, 8); acoustic bass (tracks 2, 9)
- Dan Rudin - additional percussion (track 7)
- Pam Sixfin - violin solo (tracks 7, 11)
- Chester Thompson - drums (tracks 5, 7, 8)

Design

- Kevin Majeski - art direction
- Jim Lersch - photography
- Susan Hulme, Barnes & Co. - graphic design

Vocalists

- Andy Williams - lead vocal
- William Cannon - adult choir
- Da'dra Crawford - background vocals (track 6)
- Steve Crawford - background vocals (track 6)
- Laurie Eason - children's choir
- Christi Ebenhock - children's choir
- Juanita Edwards - adult choir
- Gail Farrell - background vocals (track 3)
- Elaina Foley - children's choir
- Kara Foley - children's choir
- Richard Forde - adult choir
- Son Jones - adult choir
- Bonnie Keen - background vocals (track 3)
- Jason Laudadio - children's choir
- Melissa Laudadio - children's choir
- Marty McCall - background vocals (track 3)
- Mindy Metzger - children's choir
- Shandra Penix - adult choir
- Tiffani Ransom - adult choir
- Terita Redd - adult choir
- Fatima Richardson - adult choir
- Cindy Stuck - children's choir
- Katie Stuck - children's choir
- Randy Stuck - children's choir
- Nee-C Walls - background vocals (track 6)
- Dave Williamson - background vocals (track 3)
- Christopher Willis - adult choir

Strings (except tracks 2, 6, 8)

- David Angell - violin
- Monisa Angell - viola
- John Catchings - cello
- Bruce Christensen - viola
- Joann Cruthirds - violin
- David Davidson - violin
- Carl Gorodetzky - violin, contractor
- Jim Grosjean - viola
- Anthony Lamarchina - cello
- Lee Larrison - violin
- Bob Mason - cello
- Cate Myer - violin
- Craig Nelson - bass
- Randy Olson - violin
- Pam Sixfin - violin
- Elizabeth Stewart - bass
- Julie Tanner - cello
- Alan Umstead - violin
- Catherine Umstead - violin
- Gary Vanosdale - viola
- Mary Kathryn Vanosdale - violin
- Karen Winklemann - violin

Strings and harp (tracks 2, 6, 8)

- AWR Music, Chicago - contractor

- Strings recorded at Woodland Studios, Nashville, Tennessee, and Chicago Recording Company, Chicago, Illinois
- Andy Williams's vocals recorded at Caravell Recording Studio, Branson, Missouri
- Mixed at Quad Studios, Recording Arts and 16th Avenue South, Nashville, Tennessee
- Edited at Open Door Productions, Old Hickory, Tennessee
- Mastered at MasterMix, Nashville, Tennessee

== Bibliography ==
- Studwell, William Emmett (1995), The Christmas Carol Reader, Routledge, ISBN 1-56024-974-9
