= Daniel Roseingrave =

English organist and composer mostly active in Ireland

Daniel Roseingrave (c.1655 – May 1727) was an English-born organist and composer mainly active in Dublin, Ireland.

Roseingrave probably hailed from the area of Gloucester, where he was organist at Gloucester Cathedral (1679–1681) and where he later sent his sons for education. He subsequently became organist at Winchester Cathedral (1682–1692) and Salisbury Cathedral (1692–1698), and finally from 1698 at both Christ Church Cathedral, Dublin and St Patrick’s Cathedral, Dublin, which "marked the beginning of a period of half a century when the Roseingrave family dominated the musical scene at the Dublin cathedrals." He remained organist at Christ Church until his death in Dublin in 1727; at St Patrick's his son Ralph joined him from 1719.

He composed some church music including a verse anthem Lord, thou art become gracious. His works are often confused with that of his sons; a disentangling of the works of the various Roseingraves in Ireland was in preparation in 2014.

His sons Thomas Roseingrave and Ralph Roseingrave were likewise composers and organists.

== Bibliography ==
- Barra Boydell: Music at Christ Church before 1800: Documents and Selected Anthems (Dublin: Four Courts Press, 1999).
- –– : A History of Music at Christ Church Cathedral, Dublin (Woodbridge, Surrey: Boydell & Brewer, 2004).

Cultural offices
Preceded by Charles Wren	Organist and Master of the Choristers of Gloucester Cathedral; 1679–1682	Succeeded by Stephen Jeffries
Preceded by John Reading	Organist and Master of the Choristers of Winchester Cathedral; 1682–1692	Succeeded by Vaughan Richardson
Preceded by Peter Isaacke	Organist and Master of the Choristers of Salisbury Cathedral; 1692–1698	Succeeded by Anthony Walkley
