= Samuel Peirson =

English organist

- Born: 1647
- Died: 1720 (aged 72–73)
- Occupation: Organist

Samuel Peirson (c. 1647 – 1720) was an English organist.

== Career ==
Peirson succeeded John Reading as Organist of Chichester Cathedral in October 1677. He was suspended for three months in 1711 for his public assertion that "the late King William was a pickpocket... he had no more religion than a dog!". It was during Peirson's tenure of office that Renatus Harris installed the Main Organ in the cathedral. He died in office at Chichester.

== See also ==
- Organs and organists of Chichester Cathedral

Cultural offices
Preceded by John Reading	Organist of Chichester Cathedral; 1677–1720	Succeeded by Thomas Kelway
