= Joseph Kelway =

English organist and composer

Joseph Kelway (also Kellaway, Kellway; c. 1702–1782) was an English organist and harpsichord player, among the most highly regarded in his day.

Kelway was probably born in Chichester. He was the younger brother of the organist Thomas Kelway; he studied with him and with Francesco Geminiani.

In 1734, he succeeded Obadiah Shuttleworth as organist of St Michael, Cornhill in London; in 1736 he resigned this post to succeed John Weldon as organist of St Martin-in-the-Fields, London. Charles Burney wrote that Handel was among the musicians who visited St Martin's to hear him play. Kelway became in 1739 a founding governor of the Royal Society of Musicians.

His pupils included Charles Wesley and Mrs Mary Delaney, and he was appointed harpsichord master to Queen Charlotte at the time of her arrival in England in 1761. Richard, 7th Viscount FitzWilliam was a patron.

Burney wrote that Kelway was "a brilliant harpsichordist", and identified him as "head of the Scarlatti sect", a group of English musicians that championed the music of Domenico Scarlatti as early as 1739, also including Thomas Roseingrave. Kelway, said Burney, "kept Scarlatti's best lessons in constant practice [and] executed the most difficult lessons in a manner peculiarly neat and delicate".

His only notable publication was Six Sonatas for Harpsichord (1764), influenced by Scarlatti. Towards the end of his life, his music went out of fashion: a new style was introduced by Johann Christian Bach, and the pianoforte became fashionable.
