= Thomas Kelway =

English organist and composer

Thomas Kelway (c. 1695 - 1744) was an English organist and composer.

== Career ==
He became a chorister in the choir of Chichester Cathedral in 1704 and studied the organ with John Reading and Samuel Peirson. He succeeded Peirson as Organist of Chichester Cathedral in 1720 - however he was placed under probation for a period of 13 years before he was confirmed in the office. Kelway died in office, and left numerous compositions; his service in B minor remains a part of the choir's repertoire. During his tenure at the cathedral, John Byfield added the second manual (choir organ).

=== Compositions ===
- Magnificat & Nunc Dimittis in B minor
- Magnificat & Nunc Dimittis in G minor

== Personal life ==
Kelway was born in Chichester in c. 1695. His father was a lay vicar at Chichester Cathedral, and his brother Joseph Kelway was Organist of St Michael, Cornhill (1734-1736) and St Martin-in-the-Fields (1736-1781).

== See also ==
- Organs and organists of Chichester Cathedral

Cultural offices
Preceded by Samuel Peirson	Organist of Chichester Cathedral; 1620-1744	Succeeded by Thomas Capell
