= 16 Most Requested Songs: Encore! =

- Cover art by Bill Nelson

Compilation album by Andy Williams
- Released: May 16, 1995
- Recorded: 1957–1972
- Genre: Vocal; pop/rock; stage & screen
- Label: Columbia/Legacy

Andy Williams chronology
| Personal Christmas Collection (1994) | 16 Most Requested Songs: Encore! (1995) | We Need a Little Christmas (1995) |

16 Most Requested Songs: Encore! is a compilation album by American pop singer Andy Williams that was released by Columbia Records and Legacy Recordings on May 16, 1995.

The album did not chart in Billboard magazine until after Williams's death in 2012 when it spent its sole week on the Billboard 200 at number 152 in the issue dated October 13 of that year.

== Track listing ==
1. "Butterfly" (Bernie Lowe, Kal Mann) – 2:21
  - rec. 1/23/57; Top 100^{[A]}: #1 (3 weeks)
2. "Are You Sincere?" (Wayne Walker) – 2:41
  - rec. 12/12/57; Billboard Hot 100: #3
3. "Lonely Street" (Kenny Sowder, W.S. Stevenson, Carl Belew) – 2:46
  - rec. 8/23/59; Billboard Hot 100: #5, Hot R&B Sides: #20
4. "The Village of St. Bernadette" (Eula Parker) – 3:22
  - rec. 11/19/59; Billboard Hot 100: #7
5. "The Sweetest Sounds" from the Broadway musical No Strings (Richard Rodgers) – 2:44
  - rec. 1964 for his album The Great Songs from "My Fair Lady" and Other Broadway Hits
6. "Charade" from the film Charade (Henry Mancini, Johnny Mercer) – 2:35
  - rec. 11/1/63, rel. 12/16/63; Billboard Hot 100: #100
7. "Stranger on the Shore" (Acker Bilk) – 2:50
  - rec. 1962 for his album Warm and Willing
8. "On the Street Where You Live" from the Broadway musical My Fair Lady (Alan Jay Lerner, Frederick Loewe) – 3:12
  - rec. 5/7/64, rel. 8/25/64; Billboard Hot 100: #28, Easy Listening: #3
9. "Quiet Nights of Quiet Stars (Corcovado)" (Antonio Carlos Jobim, Gene Lees) – 3:00
  - rec. 5/18/65 rel. 11/1/65; Billboard Hot 100: #92, Easy Listening: #18
10. "Music to Watch Girls By" (Tony Velona, Sid Ramin) – 2:38
  - rec. 2/21/67, rel. 3/2/67; Billboard Hot 100: #34, Easy Listening: #2
11. "In the Arms of Love" from the film What Did You Do in the War, Daddy? (Henry Mancini, Jay Livingston, Ray Evans) – 2:56
  - rec. 6/23/66, rel. 7/8/66; Billboard Hot 100: #49, Easy Listening: #1 (2 weeks)
12. "Michelle" (John Lennon, Paul McCartney) – 3:25
  - rec. 1966 for his album The Shadow of Your Smile
13. "(Where Do I Begin?) Love Story" from the film Love Story (Francis Lai, Carl Sigman) – 3:10
  - rec. 12/17/70, rel. 1/13/71; Billboard Hot 100: #9, Easy Listening: #1 (four weeks)
14. "Happy Heart" (Jackie Rae, James Last) – 3:15
  - rec. 3/8/69, rel. 3/14/69; Billboard Hot 100: #22, Easy Listening: #1 (two weeks)
15. "Music from Across the Way" (James Last, Carl Sigman) – 3:45
  - rec. 6/10/71, rel. 12/14/71; Easy Listening: #30
16. "Speak Softly Love (Love Theme from 'The Godfather')" from the film The Godfather (Larry Kusik, Nino Rota) – 3:05
  - rec. 2/18/72 & 2/24/72, rel. 3/3/72; Billboard Hot 100: #34, Easy Listening: #7
- ^{A} This track was released before Billboard created its Hot 100 chart for tracking song performance.

== Bibliography ==
- Whitburn, Joel (2004), Joel Whitburn Presents Top R&B/Hip-Hop Singles, 1942-2004, Record Research Inc., ISBN 0-89820-160-8
- Whitburn, Joel (2007), Joel Whitburn Presents Billboard Top Adult Songs, 1961-2006, Record Research Inc., ISBN 0-89820-169-1
- Whitburn, Joel (2009), Joel Whitburn's Top Pop Singles, 1955-2008, Record Research Inc., ISBN 0-89820-180-2
