= EUMS (disambiguation) =

EUMS may mean:

- European Union Member States
- European Union Military Staff
- Edinburgh University Music Society
- European Union of Medical Specialists
