= Christmas Present (Andy Williams album) =

Studio album by Andy Williams
- Released: October 1974
- Recorded: 1974
- Genre: Vocal pop; Christmas; traditional pop
- Length: 36:31
- Label: Columbia
- Producer: Dick Glasser; Larry Brown

Andy Williams chronology
The Way We Were (1974)	Christmas Present (1974)	You Lay So Easy on My Mind (1974)

Professional ratings
Review scores
Source	Rating
Allmusic	3/5 stars
Billboard	Top Album Pick

Christmas Present is the third Christmas album by American pop singer Andy Williams (and his thirty-third studio album overall) that was released in October 1974 by Columbia Records and, apart from the title track, focused strictly on traditional carols. While his previous holiday LPs were released during the run of his variety series, which ended in 1971, this album was promoted the December following its release through one of his many Christmas specials. An article titled "MOR Artists Are Ailing" in Billboard magazine's November 23, 1974, issue describes the hopes that the record company had for the album: "Columbia is releasing Andy Williams' newest LP, 'Christmas Present,' with considerable advance orders and expects it to become a holiday classic to continue the string of album winners for the artist."

Williams's two previous solo Christmas LPs (The Andy Williams Christmas Album and Merry Christmas) reached number one on Billboard magazine's Christmas Albums chart, but in 1974 the magazine reverted to incorporating holiday releases into its Top LPs and Tapes rankings as well as its Bubbling Under the Top LPs chart, which, according to Joel Whitburn, "listed albums that were on the rise in sales that did not quite achieve the sales necessary to make Billboard's main 200-position pop albums chart." Christmas Present "bubbled under" the Top LPs & Tapes chart for two weeks that began in the issue dated December 21, 1974, and took the album to a peak position at number 203. it debuted on the Cashbox albums chart in the issue dated December 21, of that year, and remained on the chart for in a total of 2 weeks, peaking at 124

The album was released on CD in 1990. It was also included in a 2013 compilation of his Columbia Christmas releases titled The Complete Christmas Recordings.

== Track listing ==
=== Side one ===
1. "Christmas Present" (Larry H. Brown, Keats Tyler) – 2:30
2. "Joy To The World" (Lowell Mason, Isaac Watts) – 2:52
3. "O Little Town of Bethlehem" (Phillip Brooks, Lewis H. Redner) – 2:32
4. "Ring Christmas Bells"^{[A]} (Mykola Dmytrovych Leontovych, Peter Wilhousky, Minna Louise Hohman) – 1:52
5. "It Came Upon A Midnight Clear" (Edmund Hamilton Sears, Richard Storrs Willis) – 3:12
6. "Ave Maria" (Franz Schubert) – 4:34

=== Side two ===
1. "O Come All Ye Faithful" (Frederick Oakeley, John Francis Wade) – 2:35
2. "Angels We Have Heard On High" (traditional) – 2:32
3. "Hark! The Herald Angels Sing" (Felix Mendelssohn, Charles Wesley) – 2:39
4. "Ave Maria" (Johann Sebastian Bach, Charles Gounod) – 3:05
5. "What Child Is This" (William Chatterton Dix) – 2:31
6. "I Heard the Bells on Christmas Day" (John Baptiste Calkin, Henry Wadsworth Longfellow) – 2:47
7. "The Lord's Prayer" (Albert Hay Malotte) – 2:40
- ^{A} The back cover and label of the original vinyl release of this album list the title of this track as "Christmas Bells", and the label gives songwriting credit to Harry Filler and Leonard Schroeder, who did write a song called "Christmas Bells" that was recorded by Patti Page for her 1951 album Christmas with Patti Page.

== Personnel ==
From the liner notes for the original album:

- Andy Williams - vocalist
- Keats Tyler - front cover photo
- Sandy Speiser - front cover photo
- Don Eddy, FPG - back cover photo

=== Title track ===
Recorded at Columbia Records Studios, New York.

- Larry Brown - producer
- Jack Feierman - conductor
- Frank Laice - engineer

=== All other tracks ===
Recorded at The Music Centre, London, England.

- Dick Glasser - producer
- Ernie Freeman - arranger
- Ken Thorne - conductor
- The Mike Sammes Singers - background vocals

== Bibliography ==
- Whitburn, Joel (2004), Christmas in the Charts (1920-2004), Record Research Inc., ISBN 0-89820-161-6
- Whitburn, Joel (2010), Joel Whitburn Presents Top Pop Albums, Seventh Edition, Record Research Inc., ISBN 978-0-89820-183-3
