= Thomas Roseingrave =

Irish composer of English birth

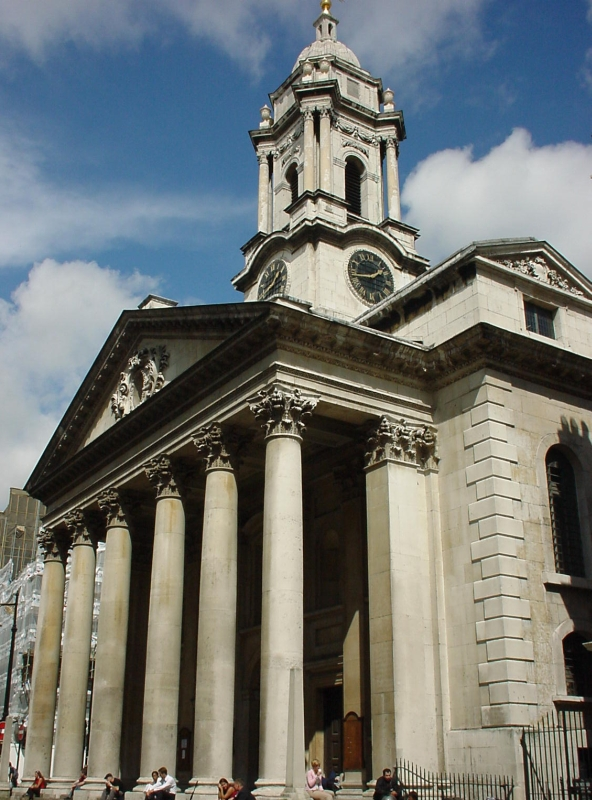
St George's, Hanover Square, where Thomas Roseingrave was appointed organist in 1725

Thomas Roseingrave (1690 or 1691 – 23 June 1766), like his father Daniel Roseingrave, was an English-born Irish composer and organist.

== Early years ==
He was born at Winchester, where his father Daniel Roseingrave was the Cathedral organist, but spent his early years in Dublin, studying music with his father (who, by then, was organist of both St Patrick’s Cathedral, Dublin and Christ Church Cathedral, Dublin). In 1707 he entered Trinity College but failed to complete his degree. In 1710 he was sent to Italy with the financial assistance of St Patrick’s Cathedral, Dublin (awarded in 1709) in order "to improve himself in the art of music". In Venice he met Domenico Scarlatti and was greatly impressed by his harpsichord playing. He followed Scarlatti to Naples and Rome and, later in life, he published an edition of Scarlatti's sonatas for harpsichord which led to a "Scarlatti cult" in England.

Roseingrave composed several works in Italy including an anthem and a cantata. He returned to England in 1717 (having left Italy for Dublin in 1713). In 1720 he produced Scarlatti's opera Amor d'un'ombra e gelosia d'un'aura under the title Narciso at the Haymarket Theatre, to which he added two arias and two duets of his own. He was appointed organist of St George's, Hanover Square, in 1725. He became known as an accomplished improviser, especially of fugues. He had a great admiration for the music of Palestrina and was highly skilled at contrapuntal writing. According to Charles Burney he could sightread the most difficult music.

== Later years ==
In the 1730s he was at the height of his technique and skill. However, his successful career came to an end when he was denied permission to marry a young lady with whom he had become infatuated. Her father would not allow her to marry a musician. The disappointment affected Roseingrave psychologically; his behaviour reportedly became irrational at times, and he neglected his duties. Eventually he retired to Dublin in 1747 where he lived with his nephew William in Dún Laoghaire. In Ireland, he mainly seems to have spent his retirement, a remarkable exception being the first and only performance of his opera Phaedra and Hippolitus on 6 March 1753 in Dublin. He died at Dún Laoghaire in 1766 and was buried in his family's grave in the churchyard of St Patrick's Cathedral, Dublin.

== Evaluation ==
Roseingrave's best compositions are his keyboard works which show surprisingly little influence of continental composers. His harpsichord works occasionally reflect the influence of Scarlatti, but the organ works are closer to the English style of Purcell and Blow. They are at times highly chromatic, reflecting the dissonant approach of English music such as Purcell's viol consort fantasies. They show irregular phrasing and form, suggesting that they may have arisen from freely extemporised performances for which he had been so famous. He also wrote solos for flute, and Italian cantatas. His contemporaries often criticised him for his "harsh, ungrateful harmony, and extravagant and licentious modulations". Most English composers in the 18th century had adopted the Italianate style in the Handelian manner, and the ears of English music lovers were becoming accustomed to the easier harmony and form of the galant style. Thus Roseingrave's music would have appeared to many to be too intellectual and old-fashioned.

One factor which led to increased esteem for Roseingrave in the 20th century (though even now his music is seldom heard in concert, as opposed to being included on recordings) was the enthusiasm demonstrated for his output by Constant Lambert. Indeed, Lambert actually oversaw the first modern editions of several Roseingrave pieces.

== Recordings ==
Selectively cited from Klein (2001)

- From: Eight Suits of Lessons for the Harpsichord or Spinnet (1728): Suite No. 1 in E flat major; Suite No. 5 in F minor; Suite No. 6 in E minor; Suite No. 7 in G major. Recorded by Paul Nicholson on Hyperion CDA 66564 (CD, 1992).
- [From same] Suite No. 8 in G major. Recorded by Douglas Gunn on Melrose Music MM CD-101 (CD, 1996).
- From Voluntarys and Fugues made on Purpose for the Organ or Harpsichord (1728): Voluntary No. 2 in G minor. Recorded by Jennifer Bate (org) on Unicorn-Kanchana DKP 9096 (CD, 1990).
- [From same] Fugue No. 13 in E minor. Recorded by Jennifer Bate (org) on Unicorn-Kanchana DKP 9104 (CD, 1991).
- [From same] Voluntary No. 4 in G minor; Voluntary No. 7 in G minor; Voluntary No. 8 in G minor; Fugue No. 6 in F major; Fugue No. 10 in G major. Recorded by Paul Nicholson on Hyperion CDA 66564 (CD, 1992).
- From: Twelve Solos for flute and basso continuo (1730): Sonata No. 2 in D major; Sonata No. 3 in G major; Sonata No. 9 in D major. Recorded by Douglas Gunn (fl), Carol O'Connor (vc), Brian McKay (hpd) on Melrose Music MM CD-101 (CD, 1996).
- Introduction in G minor (1739). Recorded by Douglas Gunn on Melrose Music MM CD-101 (CD, 1996)
- Keyboard Concerto in D major (c.1740). Reconstruction from harpsichord solo score. Recorded by Paul Nicholson (org) with Parley of Instruments Baroque Orchestra cond. by Peter Holman on Hyperion CDA 66700 (CD, 1994); re-issued as CDH 55341 (CD, 2009).
- [same], original harpsichord solo score. Recorded by Paul Nicholson (hpd) on Hyperion CDA 66564 (CD, 1992).
- From: Six Double Fugues for the Organ or Harpsichord (1750): Double Fugue No. 3 in F major; Double Fugue no. 4 in E minor. Recorded by Paul Nicholson on Hyperion CDA 66564 (CD, 1992).

== Media ==
Gigue

== Bibliography ==
- Constant Lambert: "Thomas Roseingrave", in: Proceedings of the Musical Association, volume 58 no. 1 (1931), pp. 67–83.
- Stanley Sadie (ed.)The New Grove Dictionary of Music & Musicians (London: Macmillan, 1980).
- William H. Grindle: Irish Cathedral Music (Belfast: Institute of Irish Studies, 1989).
- Peter Holman: "Purcell and Roseingrave: A New Autograph", in: Curtis Price (ed.): Purcell Studies (Cambridge: C.U.P., 1995).
- Barra Boydell: Music at Christ Church before 1800. Documents and Selected Anthems (Dublin: Four Courts Press, 1999).
- Barra Boydell: A History of Music at Christ Church Cathedral, Dublin (Woodbridge, Surrey: Boydell Press, 2004).
- Kerry Houston: "Roseingrave family", in: H. White & B. Boydell: The Encyclopaedia of Music in Ireland (Dublin: UCD Press, 2013).
