= Sir Charles Oakeley, 1st Baronet =

British baronet (1751–1826)

Sir Charles Oakeley
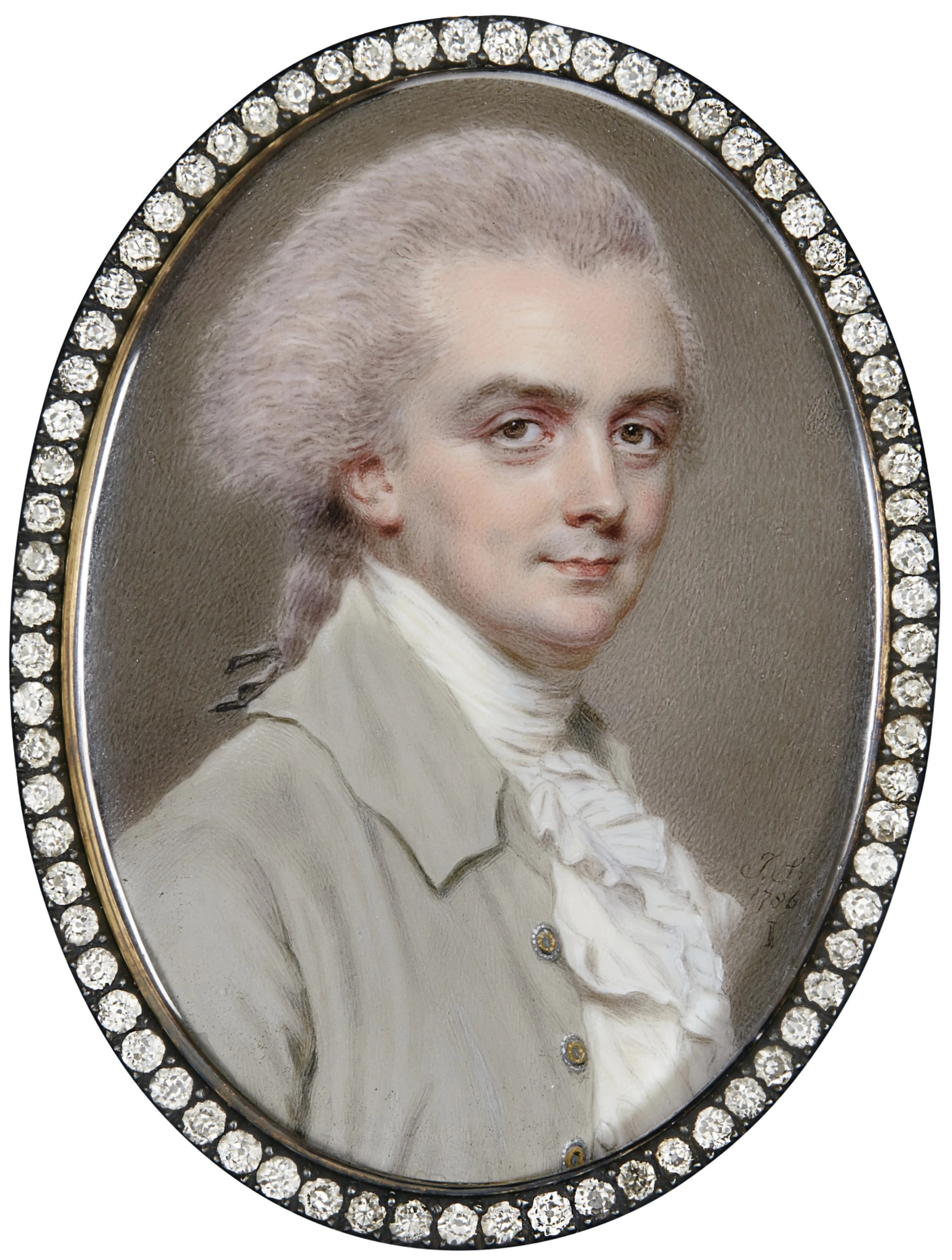
- Born: 27 February 1751
- Died: 7 September 1826 (aged 75); Palace, Lichfield
- Spouse: Lady Helena Oakeley

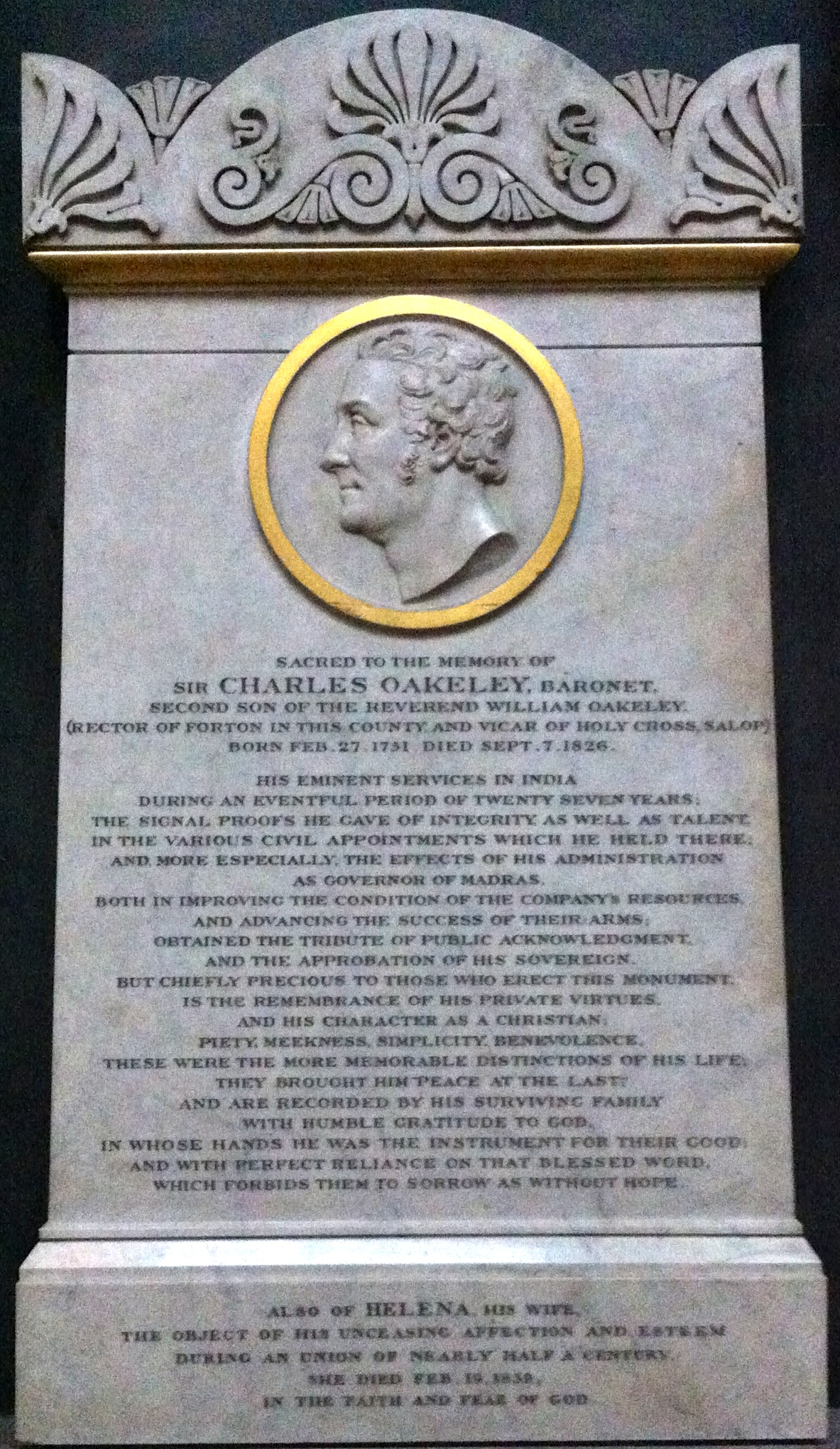
Memorial to Charles Oakeley in Lichfield Cathedral

Sir Charles Oakeley, 1st Baronet (27 February 1751 – 7 September 1826) was an English administrator. He married Helena Beatson, a talented amateur artist, and niece of notable Scottish portrait painter Catherine Read. He was the father of 14 children including Sir Charles Oakeley, 2nd Baronet, Sir Herbert Oakeley, 3rd Baronet and Frederick Oakeley. He was the grandfather of W. E. Oakeley.

Oakeley was born in Forton, Staffordshire, near Newport, a son of William Oakeley and Christian Strachan. He was educated at Shrewsbury School. The Oakeley Baronetcy of Shrewsbury was created for him on 5 June 1790. Oakeley worked as an administrator in India, and was responsible for collecting funds for the war when the Carnatic was invaded by Hyde Ally Cawn. The Second Anglo-Mysore War came to an end in 1784 and Oakeley returned to England due to family reasons in February 1789, but he was persuaded to return to India, this time to serve as the Governor of Madras, he held this post from 1790 to 1794. He died at Fort St. George, Madras, on 7 September 1826, and was buried privately at Forton. There is a monument to his memory by Chantrey in Lichfield Cathedral.

== Notes ==
Baronetage of Great Britain
| New creation | Baronet (of Shrewsbury); 1790–1826 | Succeeded by Charles Oakeley |
