= Herbert Oakeley =

English composer

Sir Herbert Stanley Oakeley (22 July 1830 – 26 October 1903) was an English composer, best known for his role as Professor of Music at the University of Edinburgh. Prior to his appointment to this role in 1865 he established his reputation as an organist, composer, and musician. During his tenure at the University of Edinburgh he founded a number of university musical societies across Scotland, most notably the Edinburgh University Music Society, and successfully resolved the university's Reid School of Music into a Faculty able to award degrees to its graduates. He socialized with and mentored contralto, composer, and festival organizer Mary Augusta Wakefield.

== Life ==
He was born at Ealing Vicarage, St Mary's Road on 22 July 1830. He was second son of Sir Herbert Oakeley, 3rd Baronet. He was educated at Rugby and at Christ Church, Oxford, he graduated B.A. in 1853 and proceeded M.A. studies in 1856. He studied with Stephen Elvey. In 1865, he was elected Reid Professor of Music at Edinburgh University. From 1866 to 1892 he was the Honorary President of Edinburgh Choral Union (later Edinburgh Royal Choral Union).

He was knighted in 1876, and in 1881 was appointed "Composer of Music to Queen Victoria in Scotland". In June 1901, he received an honorary doctorate (LL.D) from the University of Glasgow during celebrations for the university's 450th jubilee. He retired from his professorship in 1891. His address in Eastbourne was 53, Grand Parade, where he died unmarried on 26 October 1903.

== Music ==
As a composer, Oakeley mostly produced church music, including anthems, hymn tunes (most notable 'Edina' and 'Abends,') and settings of the morning and evening service. His Jubilee Cantata was written for the Cheltenham Festival in 1887. His orchestral works include the Edinburgh March and the Suite in Olden Style. Oakeley also produced songs, a piano sonata and preludes and fugues for organ.

== See also ==
- University of Edinburgh
- Edinburgh University Music Society
