= Simon Kelway =

16th-century English politician

Simon Kelway (died 1623), of Dawlish, Devon, was an English politician.

He was a member (MP) of the parliament of England for Totnes in 1589. His family were related to the Courtenay family.
