= The Best of Andy Williams (1992 album) =

Compilation album by Andy Williams
- Released: 1992
- Recorded: 1957–1975
- Genre: Traditional pop; vocal pop; standards; AM Pop; early pop/rock; soft rock; film music; soundtracks
- Label: Dino Entertainment

Andy Williams chronology
Nashville (1991)	The Best of Andy Williams (1992)	Greatest Hits (1994)

The Best of Andy Williams is a compilation album by American pop singer Andy Williams that was released by Dino Entertainment in 1992.

The album debuted on the UK albums chart on November 7, 1992, and remained on the chart for three weeks, peaking at number 51.

== Track listing ==
1. "Moon River" from Breakfast at Tiffany's (Henry Mancini, Johnny Mercer) – 2:46
2. "(Where Do I Begin) Love Story" (Francis Lai, Carl Sigman) – 3:10
3. "Almost There" from I'd Rather Be Rich (Jerry Keller, Gloria Shayne) – 2:59
4. "Days of Wine and Roses" from Days of Wine and Roses (Henry Mancini, Johnny Mercer) – 2:48
5. "Can't Get Used to Losing You" (Jerome "Doc" Pomus, Mort Shuman) – 2:25
6. "Solitaire" (Phil Cody, Neil Sedaka) - 4:22
7. "Can't Take My Eyes Off You" (Bob Crewe, Bob Gaudio) – 3:15
8. "Feelings" (Morris Albert) – 2:56
9. "The Look of Love" from Casino Royale (Burt Bacharach, Hal David) – 2:55
10. "May Each Day" from The Andy Williams Show (Mort Green, George Wyle) – 2:54
11. "Can't Help Falling in Love" (George Weiss, Hugo Peretti, Luigi Creatore) – 3:15
12. "The Way We Were" from The Way We Were (Alan Bergman, Marilyn Bergman, Marvin Hamlisch) - 3:18
13. "Speak Softly Love (Love Theme from 'The Godfather')" (Larry Kusik, Nino Rota) – 3:05
14. "A Man and a Woman" from A Man and a Woman (Pierre Barouh, Jerry Keller, Francis Lai) – 2:50
15. "Here, There and Everywhere" (John Lennon, Paul McCartney) – 3:15
16. "Yesterday When I Was Young" (Charles Aznavour, Herbert Kretzmer) – 3:52
17. "Wichita Lineman" (Jimmy Webb) – 2:55
18. "Happy Heart" (James Last, Jackie Rae) – 3:15
19. "Butterfly" (Bernie Lowe, Kal Mann) – 2:21
20. "Home Lovin' Man" (Roger Cook, Roger Greenaway, Tony Macaulay) – 3:10
21. "Misty" (Erroll Garner, Johnny Burke) – 3:24
22. "Born Free" from Born Free (Don Black, John Barry) – 2:27
