= Edinburgh University Music Society =

Student-run musical organisation based in Edinburgh

Edinburgh University Music Society (EUMS)
- Orchestra
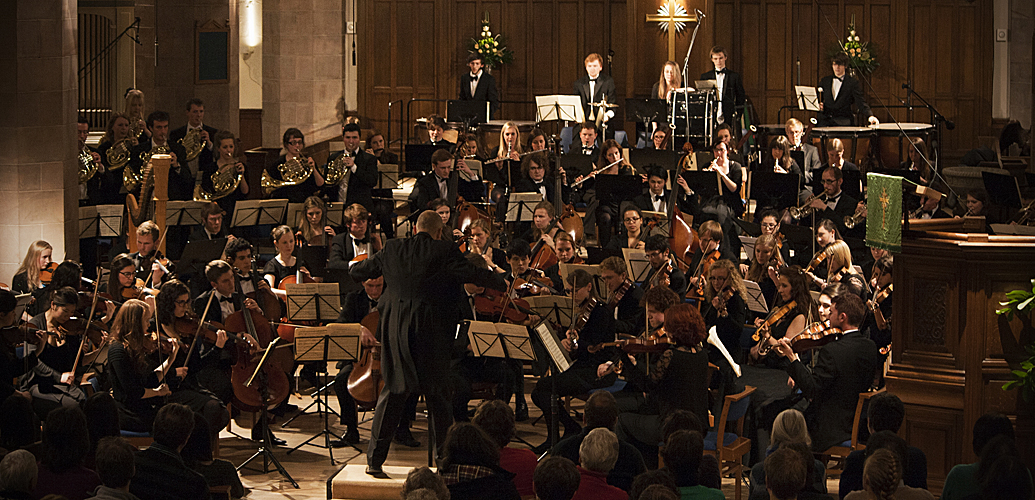
- Performing Mahler in Greyfriars Kirk, Edinburgh
- Founded: 1867
- Principal conductor: Neil Metcalfe (Chorus), Monty Milner (Sinfonia), William Conway (Symphony)
- Website: www.eums.org.uk

The Edinburgh University Music Society (EUMS) is a student-run musical organisation based in Edinburgh. Since its founding in 1867, the EUMS has been based within the University of Edinburgh.

The society performs in three concert series throughout the year whilst also undertaking a programme of charity events and education projects.

== History ==
The Edinburgh University Music Society is the oldest student’s musical society in Scotland and can be traced back to its origins in a concert in February 1867: the 27th Reid Memorial Concert. This concert was unusual in that, rather than exclusively relying on the professional players within Edinburgh at the time, as had been normal up until this point, the performance was cast as a "University Amateur Concert". It consisted of a selection of musicians from around the University of Edinburgh, most students, some academics, and others members of the St. Cecilia Instrumental Society.

They were led by the then professor Herbert Oakeley in George Street’s Music Hall (now the Assembly Rooms). That summer a draft constitution was set down and at the commencement of the next academic year the first students rehearsed under Oakeley for the first time in what became known as the Edinburgh University Musical Society.

The society first performed in what became an annual concert in March 1868. Oakeley soon called on his influence to enhance the standing of the society, and in 1872 the Edinburgh University Musical Society performed alongside the Hallé Orchestra from Manchester and a selection of well-known artists of the time. This performance began a three-day festival devoted to the continuation of General John Reid’s passion for music.

Carl Orff's Carmina Burana was premiered in Scotland by the EUMS in 1963, and the BBC has made recordings of several EUMS concerts. In 2007, the society celebrated its 140th anniversary with a series of concerts in the impressive McEwan Hall, ending with a widely acclaimed rendition of Verdi’s Requiem to a thousand-strong audience.

== Structure ==
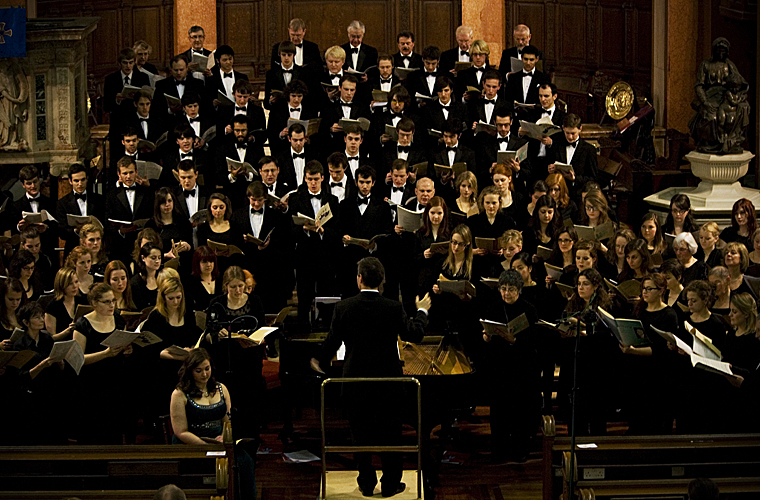
Chorus performing Poulenc's Gloria in St. Cuthberts Parish Church, Edinburgh

The society in its current form consists of three ensembles: Chorus, Sinfonia and the Symphony Orchestra.

=== Chorus ===
The largest ensemble in the Edinburgh University Music Society is the Chorus, conducted by Neil Metcalfe. It consists of between 150 and 200 people and is non-auditioned. Recent performances have included Jenkins' Armed Man and Bruckner's Te Deum.

=== Sinfonia ===
Sinfonia, a full symphony orchestra conducted by Monty Milner, consists of auditioned players apart from the string section which is non-auditioning. Alongside Chorus, they perform a large choral piece every other year.

=== Symphony Orchestra ===
The Symphony Orchestra, a large fully auditioning orchestra of high standard, is conducted by William Conway. They perform works from a wide range of composers including romantic and 20th century artists. Recent performances have included pieces by Mahler, Shostakovich, Sibelius, Dvořák, Tchaikovsky, Chausson and Rimsky-Korsakov, amongst others. As with Sinfonia, the Symphony Orchestra perform with Chorus once every two years. In 2011 this piece was Elgar's Dream of Gerontius.

== Activities ==
In May the society entered a float in the Charities Week Procession: this took the form of a section of the choir and orchestra under the direction of Mr. Mortimer Henderson in an interminable performance of the then currently popular song "Davy Crockett" - the whol (sic) going under the name "Crockett Philharmonic".

— Herbert Shepherd, EUMS Minutes from 12 March 1957

=== Work with charity ===
An excerpt from the Society's minutes in 1957 indicates that the Edinburgh University Music Society has been involved with supporting charities since at least the 1950s.

More recently, EUMS has worked with Scottish charity the Bethany Christian Trust to host the Big Sing 2012. The Big Sing is a come and sing Handel's Messiah, raising money for the Bethany Christian Trust's Stop Homelessness campaign. The project ran for the first time in 2011 when it raised over £1300 for the charity. Following this, EUMS collaborated with Drake Music Scotland in 2013. Drake Music Scotland is a Scottish charity that enables children and adults with disabilities to learn, compose and perform music. Through carolling projects, EUMS raised £600 for them.

=== Work in education ===
In the early 2000s, the Edinburgh University Music Society piloted a project where a group of members went to Edinburgh schools for an afternoon presentation about classical music and the structure of the orchestra. For the next few years the project developed and greatly contributed to the society being awarded the Edinburgh University Students' Association Community Action Award in 2010. The project currently runs on an annual basis, and is a series of hour-long education projects. Members from the society show local primary school students the workings of an orchestra, and a choir, and the pupils are able to learn all about the different instruments and voices.

EUMS takes an active interest in music education; other projects run by the society have included free entry to EUMS concerts when a school booked a class to attend, collaborative performances between a school ensemble and members of the society, and group master-classes hosted by senior players. All concert and tour programmes run by EUMS welcome audiences of all ages, and the society as a whole looks to promote classical music within the University of Edinburgh and the wider community.

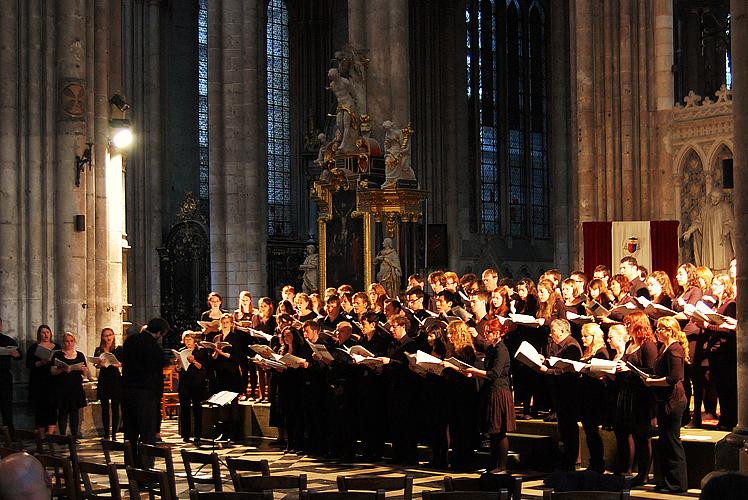
EUMS performing in Amiens Cathedral whilst on tour in France

=== Tours ===
The EUMS regularly tours to locations across the United Kingdom and Europe. These usually consist of a touring orchestra and chorus. Recent tours have included destinations such as Ireland, Belgium, France, Holland and Norway.

== Notable alumni ==
=== Patrons ===
- 1957–1983 Sir Adrian Boult
- 1963–1982 Carl Orff

=== Conductors ===
Years active	Name	Position
1867–1891	Sir Herbert Oakeley	Conductor & Founder
1891–1896	Carl Hamilton	Conductor
1896 – between 1914/23	James A. Moonie	Conductor
Between 1914/23 – 1941	Henry Kinniburgh Robertson	Conductor
1941–1971	Prof. Sidney Newman	Conductor & Chorusmaster
1946–1951	Dr. Hans Gál	Orchestra conductor
1951–1958	Owen Swindale	Orchestra conductor
1959–1962	Dr. Kenneth Leighton	Orchestra conductor
1963–1965	Ted Smith	Orchestra conductor
1965–1969	Edward Harper	Orchestra conductor
1969–1971	Alasdair Mitchell	Orchestra conductor
1971 – ?	Michael Lester-Cribb	Orchestra conductor
1971 – ?	Raymond Monelle	Chorusmaster
1984–1989	Christopher Bell	Conductor
1991–1998	James White	Conductor
? – 2004	James Lowe	Conductor
2002–2008	Ewan C. Armstrong	Chorusmaster
2004–2022	Russell Cowieson	Symphony Orchestra conductor
2004–2006	Tom Butler	Sinfonia conductor
2006–2009	Iain McLarty	Sinfonia conductor
2009 – present	Neil Metcalfe	Chorusmaster
2009–2011	Nicholas Fletcher	Sinfonia conductor
2011–2013	Michael Graham	Sinfonia conductor
2013–2015	Peter Keenan	Sinfonia conductor
2015–2018	Michael Devlin	Sinfonia conductor
2018–2020	Ondřej Soukup	Sinfonia conductor
2020–2023	Sam McLellan	Sinfonia conductor
2022 – present	William Conway	Symphony Orchestra conductor
2023–2024	Kristine Donnan	Sinfonia conductor
2024 – present	Monty Milner	Sinfonia conductor

=== Other members ===
- Sir Alexander Mackenzie
- Donald Runnicles
- James MacMillan

== See also ==
- The Edinburgh Society of Organists
