= Sir Herbert Oakeley, 3rd Baronet =

English churchman

Sir Herbert Oakeley, 3rd Baronet (1791–1845) was an English churchman, archdeacon of Colchester from 1841.

== Life ==
The third son of Sir Charles Oakeley, 1st Baronet, he was born in Madras on 10 February 1791, and brought to England in 1794 by his family. After some years at Westminster School, he entered Christ Church, Oxford. In 1810 he took a first-class in literæ humaniores, graduated B.A. on 23 February 1811, and obtained a senior studentship. He proceeded M.A. on 4 November 1813.

Oakeley was ordained, and became in 1814 domestic chaplain to William Howley, then Bishop of London, to whom he owed subsequent preferment, and resided with the bishop for 12 years, until his marriage. He was presented by Howley to the vicarage of Ealing in 1822, and to the prebendal stall of Wenlock's Barn in St Paul's Cathedral. As a married man he took up residence at Ealing.

By the death of his elder brother Charles, without male issue, Oakeley succeeded in 1830 to the baronetcy. In 1834 Howley, now Archbishop of Canterbury, presented him to the rectory of Bocking, Essex, a living once held by his father-in-law; the anomalous "archbishop's peculiar" of Bocking was abolished shortly after Oakeley's death. Both at Ealing and at Bocking, Oakeley was one of the first to carry out the system of parochial organisation by means of district visitors, weekday services, and Sunday-schools. Bocking contained many nonconformists, with whom Oakeley engaged in disputes about church rates.

In 1841 Oakeley succeeded William Lyall in the archdeaconry of Colchester; and when the bishopric of Gibraltar was founded in 1842, it was offered to him, though he declined it. He died in London on 27 March 1845. He wrote for private circulation short poems, and a memoir of his father.

== Family ==
On 5 June 1826 Oakeley was married at St. Margaret's Church, Westminster, to Atholl Keturah Murray, daughter of Lord Charles Murray Aynsley. She died on 26 January 1844. They left four sons, of whom the eldest, Charles William, succeeded to the baronetcy, and the second, Herbert (1830–1903), was Reid Professor of Music at Edinburgh; and three daughters.

== Notes ==
Attribution

This article incorporates text from a publication now in the public domain: Lee, Sidney, ed. (1895). "Oakeley, Herbert". Dictionary of National Biography. Vol. 41. London: Smith, Elder & Co.

Baronetage of the United Kingdom
Preceded by Sir Charles Oakeley	Baronet (of Shrewsbury); 1829–1845	Succeeded by Sir Charles Oakeley
