= The Edinburgh Society of Organists =

The Edinburgh Society of Organists (ESO) was founded in 1913 by Dr William Baird Ross, whose original aim was to provide "social intercourse and friendly interchange of opinion". This is still an aim of the Society today along with the promotion of local organs and organists.

== History ==
Now over 100 years old, the ESO has evolved and survived by adapting to the changing needs of the organists' profession and the needs of church music in general.

When the society was founded by Dr William Baird Ross, esteemed organist of Broughton Place U.P. Church (now Lyon and Turnbull's showroom), its principal raison d'être was to give Edinburgh's organists the chance to meet each other and to learn about each other's work and experiences. The first meeting of the new society was held on 24 June 1913.

Over the decades, the ESO has strived to encourage potential young organists, to negotiate with church authorities over salary scales at a national level, to provide an organ advisory service to help churches maintain their instruments in a cost-effective way, and to provide finance and other initiatives to assist with organists' training.

Since its formation, the ESO has held monthly meetings for its members that range from recitals, lectures, visits to organs and social events.

Membership has risen gradually from about 60 in 1913 to a peak of over 250 in the early 1980s and some 220 at present. In many respects it is one of the most active of the musical societies which exists in Scotland at the present time.

== Office bearers ==
The Society elects a council to plan events and make decisions on behalf of the Society's members.

The council usually consists of the president, the vice-president, the past president (for one year after leaving office) the honorary secretary, the membership secretary, the honorary treasurer, the editor of Console (the Society's magazine), and six to ten 'members of council' who have no specific responsibility.

In addition, there is an honorary president and nine honorary vice-presidents. These are normally people who have a link to the Society and made a significant contribution to local, national or international church or organ music.

Honorary President	Susan Landale, Mus.B., Hon. F.R.C.O., Hon. A.R.A.M., L.R.A.M., L.T.C.L.
Honorary Vice-presidents	Rev Thomas Cuthell, M.A., B.D. Dr Francis Jackson, O.B.E., D.Mus., F.R.C.O., F.R.S.C.M., F.R.N.C.M., F.W.C.C. (Organist Emeritus, York Minster) Jos van der Kooy (Westerkerk, Amsterdam, Town Organist, Haarlem and teacher at the Royal Conservatory at The Hague) Michael Reckling (Organo del Sol Mayor, Marbella, Spain) Rt Rev Brian A Smith, M.A., M.Litt. (Episcopal Bishop of Edinburgh) Rev Dr Russell Barr (Moderator of the Presbytery of Edinburgh)
