= Catherine Read =

British artist (1723–1778)

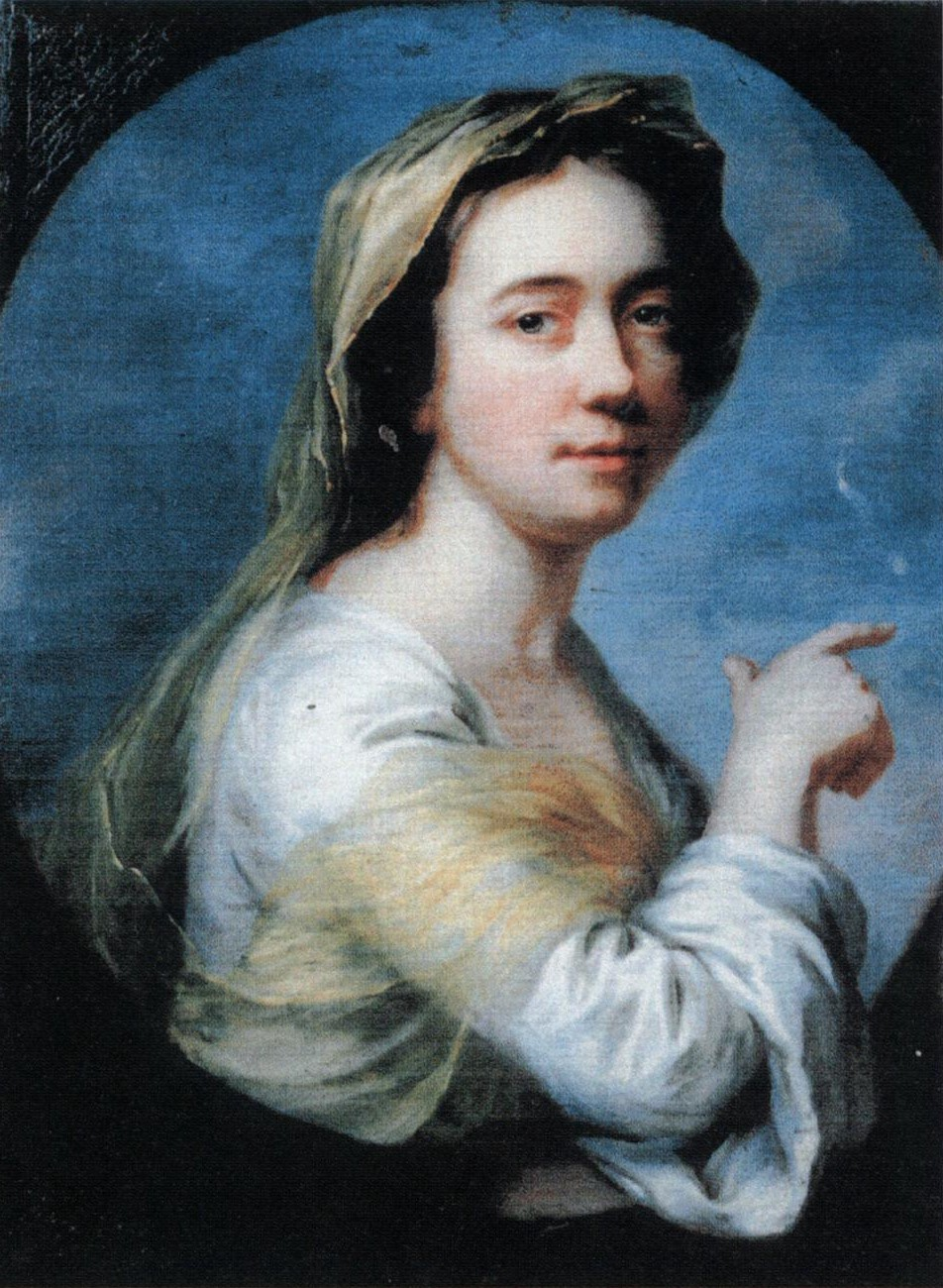
- Self-portrait
- Born: 19 January 1722; Dundee, Scotland
- Died: 15 December 1778 (aged 55) at sea, near Madras, India

Catherine Read (or Katherine; 3 February 1723 - 15 December 1778) was a Scottish artist. Born in the early 18th century, she is most known for her work as a portrait-painter. She was for some years a fashionable artist in London, working in oils, crayons, and miniature. From 1760 she exhibited almost annually with either the Incorporated Society of Artists, the Free Society of Artist, or the Royal Academy, sending chiefly portraits of ladies and children of the aristocracy, which she painted with much grace and refinement.

== Early life ==
Read was born in Dundee, Scotland on 3 February 1723, to Alexander and Elizabeth Read, and the fifth of thirteen children of an affluent Forfarshire family. She received her education from Maurice Quentin De La Tour in Edinburgh. Her mother was the sister of Sir John Wedderburn, 5th Baronet of Blackness, who fought in the Jacobite rising of 1745, and whose daughters were cared for by Read after his execution.

== Artistic education in Paris and Rome ==
When the war ended at the Battle of Culloden and with family friends fleeing to France, Read’s family was prompted to follow suit for their association and support of the Jacobite cause through her uncle. Through their connections of the gentry, they were given sanctuary in Paris that same year and introduced to the painter Robert Strange, who is speculated to be Read's teacher and introduction into the French artistic sphere. There she studied other works of art and improved her skills with little hindrance or instruction; it would have been hard for her to have been accepted into an academy class as a woman, let alone a foreigner whose family had a price on their heads for aiding and supporting a cause against the King of Great Britain and Ireland, but from the late 1740s, she spent time in the studios of the pastellist Maurice Quentin de la Tour and Louis Blanchet.

This period was not to last, however, as she fled to Rome in 1750 along with a majority of the Jacobites that had sought refuge in Paris. While there, she became friends with members of the Roman Catholic Church, often commissioned to recreate master paintings in oil or pastel for those in high clerical positions. One of these faithful patrons, Cardinal Albani, allowed Read to copy some of the portraits he owned by Rosalba Carriera, which ultimately led the man to sit for her himself.

== Career and court commissions ==
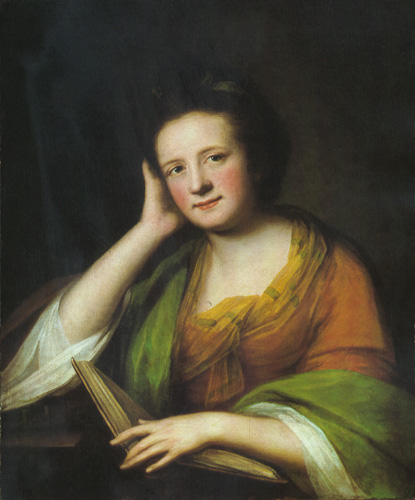
Read's portrait of Frances Moore Brooke, circa 1771

She remained in Rome until deciding to venture to England in 1753, with the blessing of Albani - who managed to help her keep face regardless of her family’s past alignment in the war. This era was filled with a healthy stream of patronage and commissions. She attracted a distinguished circle of clients, including Queen Charlotte. At the height of her career, her work was widely engraved, bringing her important artistic endorsement and commercial success. Read communicated with and submitted samples to the Society of Arts for their collection and approval of fixing pastels. However, her methods, when compared to those of Sebastien Jurine, were considered inferior as she used a different type of pastel than he.

In 1764, Read was on the road back to Paris for commissioned portraits of Madame Elisabeth through the Dauphin. Her work was shown by the Free Society (1761-1768) and the Society of Artists (1760-1772), of which she became an honorary member in 1769 along with the two other female pastel artists, Mary Benwell and Mary Black, in response to the Royal Academy accepting Angelica Kauffman and Mary Moser into their respective fold. Later, after a failed petition to the king, Read left to join the Royal Academy and was expelled from the Society as consequence.

Her London residence was in St. James's Place until 1766, when she moved to Jermyn Street.

== Later life and death ==
New pastel artists rose into the public’s view and Read no longer commanded such a following.

In 1771, she went to India to paint the portraits of the English officers living there, as well as being the first Western woman to paint an Indian subject. She was accompanied by her niece, Helena "Nelly" Beatson, a clever young artist. Read was disappointed when Beatson there married, in 1777, (Sir) Charles Oakeley, baronet, later governor of Madras who disliked the idea of having a painter for wife, and according to professor Catriona Seth, made Beatson stop seeing Read. Read is established to be in India in at least 1775 and 1777, her health failing, and as dying at sea near Madras attempting to return home. Her death is recorded as 15 December 1778.

== Works ==
In 1763, she exhibited a portrait of Queen Charlotte with the infant Prince of Wales, and in 1765 one of the latter with his brother, Prince Frederick.

On resuming her practice, Read settled in Welbeck Street. Many of her portraits were well engraved by Valentine Green and James Watson, and a pair of plates, by J. Finlayson, of the celebrated Gunning sisters, the Duchess of Argyll and the Countess of Coventry, remained popular.

Some works by Read have at one time been attributed to Joshua Reynolds. A portrait of Lady Georgiana Spencer has been noted as one of her finest.

In 2026 a portrait of an Indian woman was attributed to Read by experts as part of the BBC television series Fake or Fortune?. It is believed to be the first known portrait of an Indian sitter by a British woman artist.

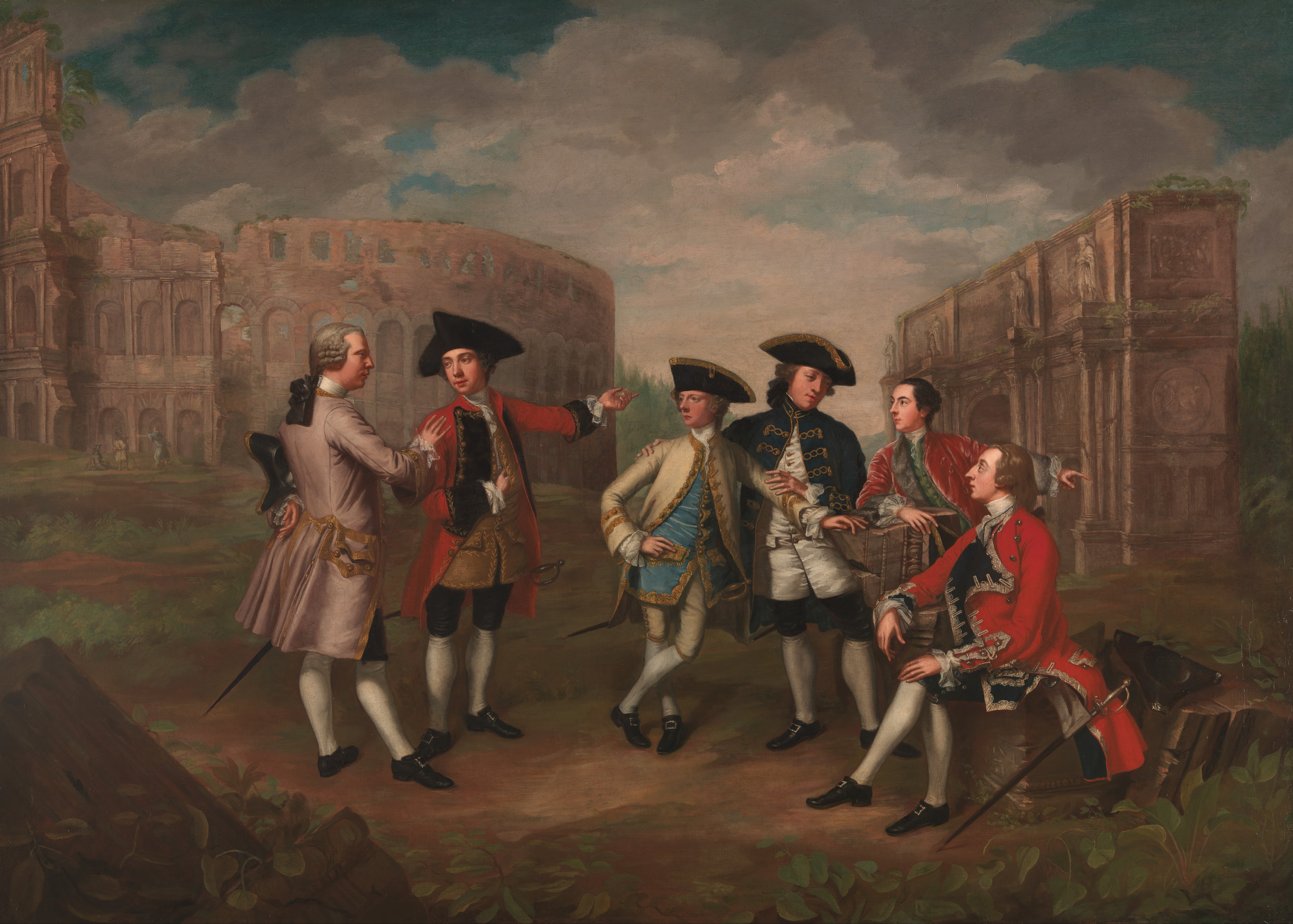
British Gentlemen in Rome, circa 1750, Yale Center for British Art

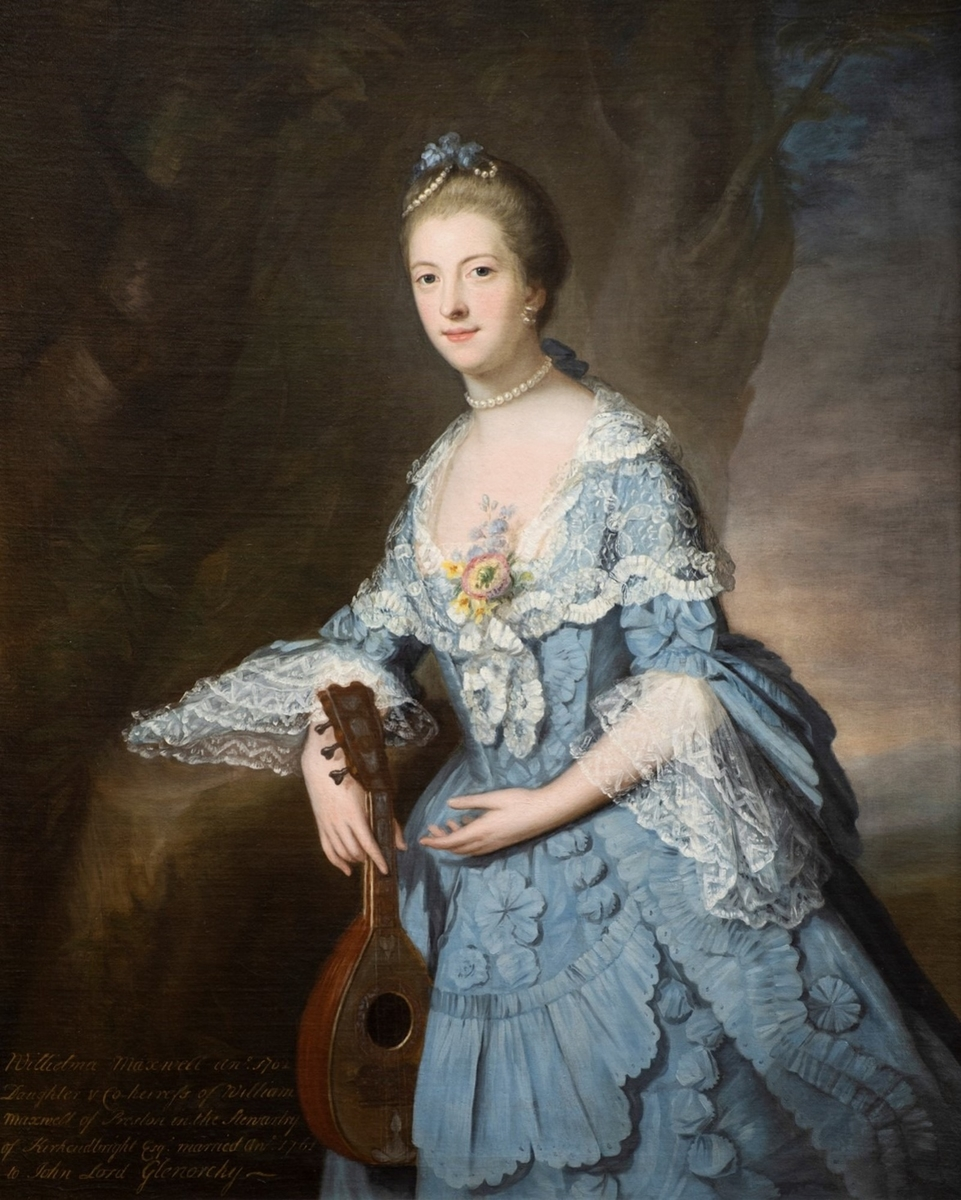
Willielma Campbell, née Maxwell), Lady Glenorchy, 1762, The McManus

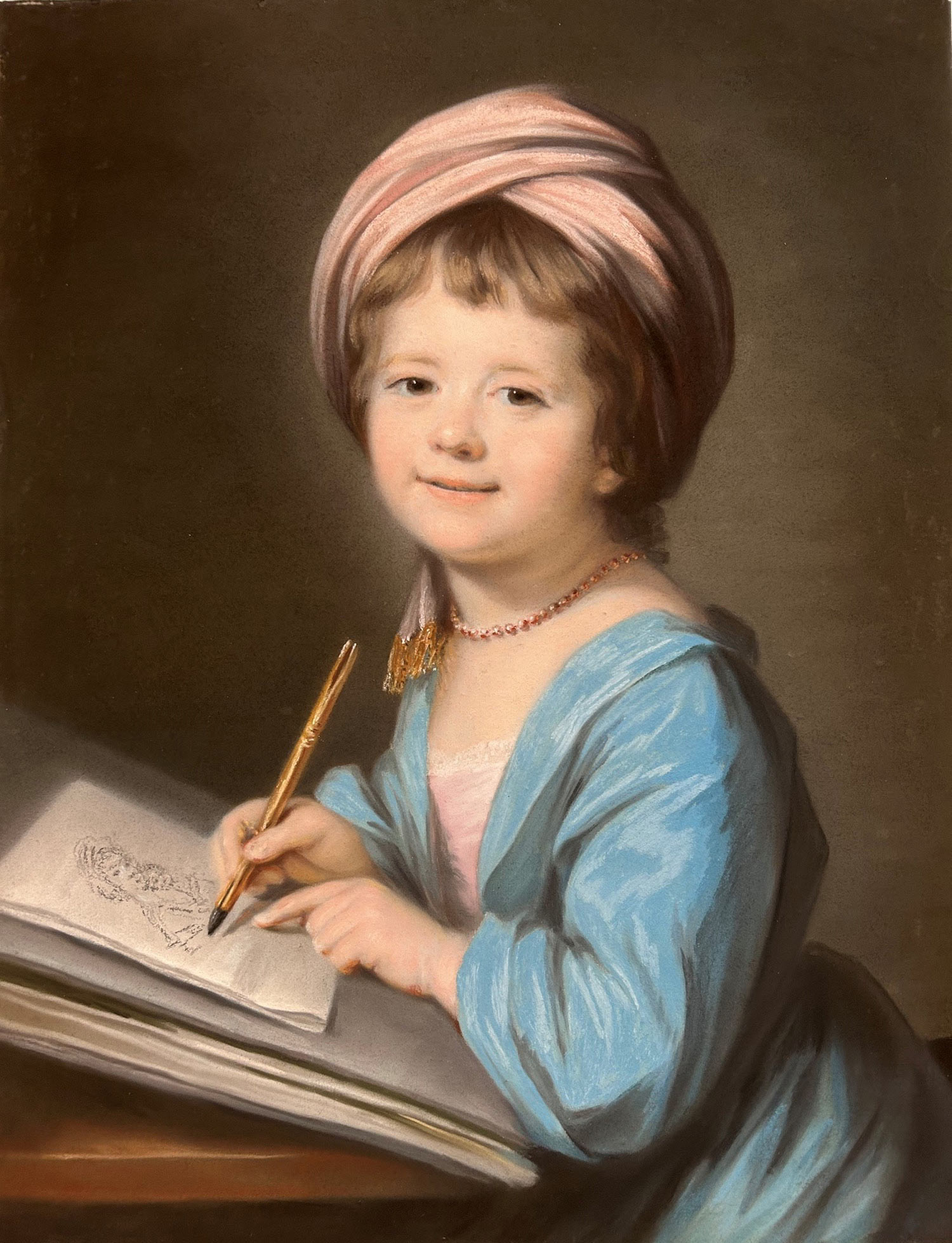
Miss Helena Beatson (the artist's niece), pastel, 1767, Katrin Bellinger Collection

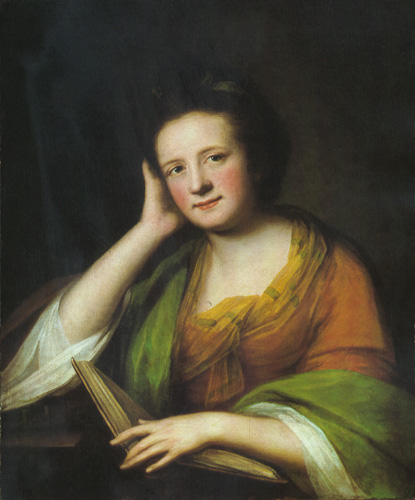
Frances Brooke, circa 1771

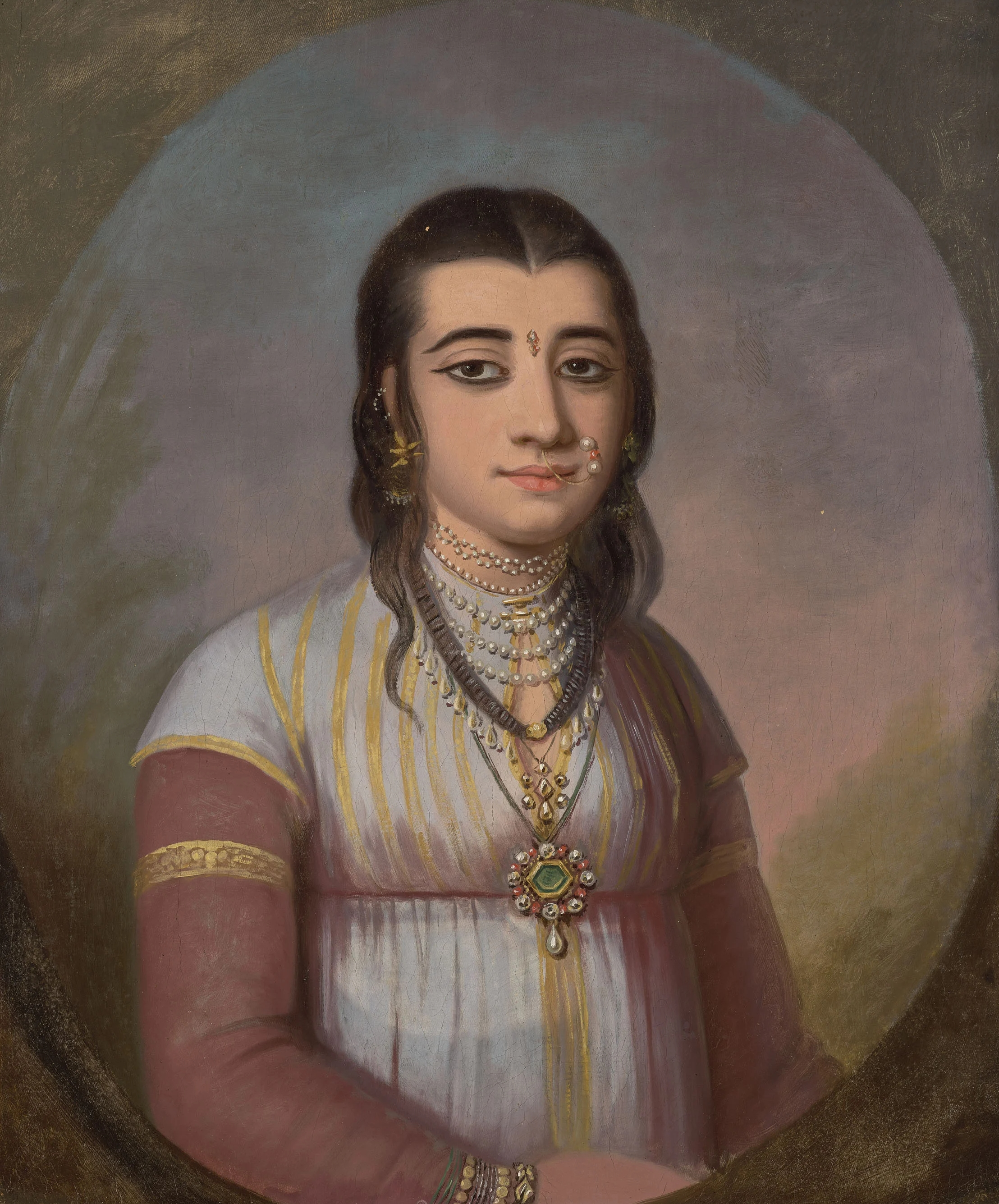
Portrait of an Indian Woman, 1777-1778, attributed to Read in Fake or Fortune? in 2026

== Legacy ==
Read's talent for portraiture was highly regarded in her day, and was the subject of an epistle by Tobias Smollett:

Let candid Justice our attention lead,
to the soft crayon of the graceful Read.

and praised by William Hayley.

She also provided Matronage opportunities for many other female artists such as Caroline Watson (1675-1757)
