= Delta Entertainment Corporation =

American music and video product supplier

Delta Entertainment Corporation (previously known as Delta Music Inc.), was a major supplier of music and video products based in Santa Monica, California. The company filed for bankruptcy in 2007.

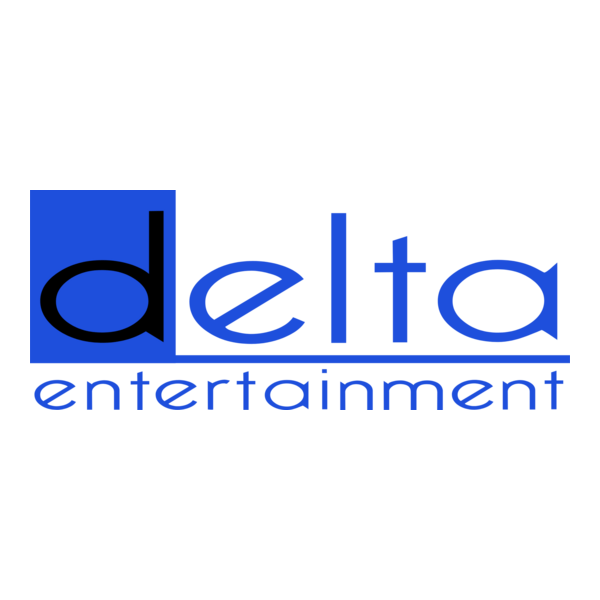
Delta's logo

== History ==
Delta Entertainment Corporation released music under the labels of LaserLight Digital, Time-Life Music, Reader's Digest Music, Yamaha, Legend and Style, Capriccio and Delta. On July 25, 2007, Delta Entertainment Corporation filed a voluntary petition for reorganization under Chapter 11 of the U.S. Bankruptcy Court for the Central District of California, Los Angeles. At the time of the Chapter 11 filing, two major unsecured creditors were Sony Disc Manufacturing, owed over $1,000,000, and the Harry Fox Agency, which was owed over $300,000. The latter controls the issuance of all mechanical licenses for the reproduction of musical compositions, and collects the licensing fees on behalf of music publishers, effectively having a monopoly on this area of the music business. From the time of the 2007 Chapter 11 filing until mid-2008, Delta was in the process of formulating a plan of reorganization, which ultimately settled on the liquidation of the company. One dimension of the liquidation was the sale of over 170 music licenses owned by Delta Entertainment.

Delta Entertainment's Chapter 11 filing had been preceded by a lawsuit, commenced in 2003, against the Harry Fox Agency, which at that time had ceased to issue any further licenses to Delta Entertainment. The two parties disputed amounts owed to each other. The Harry Fox Agency, based on an audit of the 1991-1997 period, claimed $15 million in unpaid royalties from Delta. The audit had commenced in 1996, and took four years to complete. Of the $15 million claimed, only $2 million represented allegedly unpaid royalties discovered through the audit. $6.1 million of the balance of the claim was "extrapolated" from what was found. In addition, $5.5 million in interest was claimed. Delta had countered with its own audit, whereby it contended that it had overpaid the Harry Fox Agency by over $1 million during the period under review.
