= O Come, All Ye Faithful =

Christmas carol of unknown authorship

- Native name: Adeste Fideles
- Genre: Christmas music Hymn
- Language: Latin, English
- Published: 1751

"O Come, All Ye Faithful", also known by its original title "Adeste Fideles", is a Christmas carol that has been attributed to various authors, including John Francis Wade (1711–1786), John Reading (1645–1692), King John IV of Portugal (1604–1656), and anonymous Cistercian monks. The earliest printed version is in a book published by Wade. A manuscript by Wade, dating to 1751, is held by Stonyhurst College in Lancashire.

The original four verses of the hymn were extended to a total of eight, and these have been translated into many languages. In 1841, the English Catholic priest Frederick Oakeley translated the hymn into English as "O Come All Ye Faithful", which became widespread in English-speaking countries.

== History ==
=== Text ===
The original text of the hymn has been from time to time attributed to various groups and individuals, including St. Bonaventure in the 13th century or King John IV of Portugal in the 17th, though it was more commonly believed that the text was written by Cistercian monks – the German, Portuguese or Spanish provinces of that order having at various times been credited. A parody of the chorus ("venite apotemus") was current before 1542, when it appears in chapter 41 of Rabelais' "Gargantua".

In modern English hymnals, the text is usually credited to John Francis Wade, whose name appears on the earliest printed versions. Wade, an English Catholic, lived in exile in France and made a living as a copyist of musical manuscripts which he found in libraries. He often signed his copies, possibly because his calligraphy was so beautiful that his clients requested this. In 1751 he published a printed compilation of his manuscript copies, Cantus Diversi pro Dominicis et Festis per annum. This is the first printed source for Adeste Fideles.

The version published by Wade consisted of four Latin verses. Later in the 18th century, the French Catholic priest Jean-François-Étienne Borderies wrote an additional three verses in Latin. Another anonymous Latin verse is rarely printed.

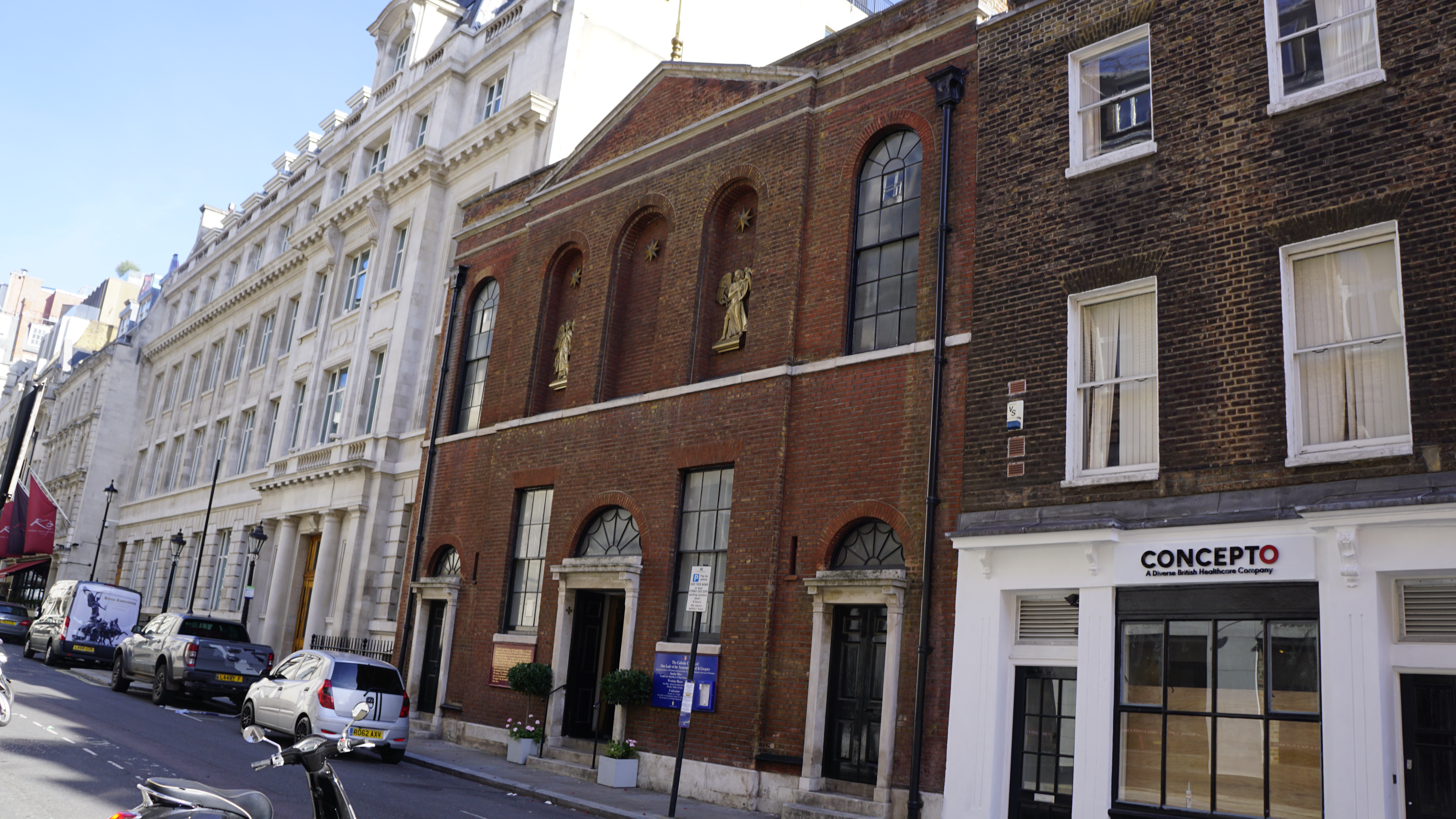
Our Lady of the Assumption and St Gregory, Warwick Street

The text has been translated innumerable times into English. The most common version today is a combination of one of Frederick Oakeley's translations of the original four verses, and William Thomas Brooke's translation of the first three additional verses. It was first published in Murray's Hymnal in 1852. Oakeley originally titled the song "Ye Faithful, approach ye" when it was sung at his Margaret Chapel in Marylebone (London), before it was altered to its current form. The song was sometimes referred to as the "Portuguese Hymn" after the Duke of Leeds, in 1795, heard a version of it sung at the Portuguese embassy in London, now Our Lady of the Assumption and St Gregory, Warwick Street. McKim and Randell nonetheless argue for Wade's authorship of the most popular English-language version. Bennett Zon offers limited support for that argument, although he also suggests that the author may instead have been someone known to Wade.

=== Claims of Jacobite connections ===
Although the hymn's exact sources and origins remain unproven, there is universal agreement among musicologists that it was through the efforts of Catholic layman and music copyist John Francis Wade that it first appeared in print. Wade himself fled to France after the Jacobite rising of 1745 was crushed, and his liturgical books were often decorated with Jacobite imagery (for context, the aim of the rebellion had been to restore a Catholic monarch – Charles Edward Stuart, popularly known as "Bonnie Prince Charlie" – to the throne of England). These aspects of Wade's life and political leanings have given rise to speculation that he might have intended for Adeste Fideles to be a ciphered birth ode to the Jacobite's Young Pretender.

This theory regarding the hymn's meaning has been most recently proposed by Professor Bennett Zon, head of music at Durham University. It essentially holds that "the song's original Latin version was actually a coded rallying cry for the Stewart cause". Elements of this theory include:

- The as-yet-unproven but popular claim that "Bethlehem" was a common Jacobite cipher for England.
- The claim (also currently unproven) that Wade deliberately meant for the title Regem Angelorum – which is found in the hymn's original Latin lyrics and translates literally to "King of Angels" – to refer to the king of England via a pun on the Latin words "Angelorum" ("of the angels") and "Anglorum" ("of the English").
- The fact that during the mid-18th century some English Roman Catholic liturgical books would place Adeste Fideles physically close to prayers for the would-be king in exile.

Proponents of this theory interpret the notions and circumstances described above as evidence that the lyrics of Adeste Fideles are meant to be "a call to arms for faithful Jacobites to return with triumphant joy to England (Bethlehem) and venerate the king of angels, that is, the English king (Bonnie Prince Charlie)." However, certain historical circumstances would seem to disprove or at least problematize the Jacobite ode theory. Namely:

1. The absence of any textual evidence that can conclusively prove that Wade explicitly composed Adeste Fideles as a piece of political propaganda. In the absence of such evidence, the Jacobite imagery found in Wade's books might be merely an expression of the author's idiosyncratic blend of political and religious thought, which in turn might have reflected the sentiments of Catholic Jacobites as a group.
2. Sources that credit the hymn's composition to Wade overlook the fact that the exact origins of Adeste Fideles are uncertain. It is not known whether Wade might have simply copied the hymn from other sources (for instance, it could have been composed by Cistercian monks and eventually sung at the Portuguese embassy chapel in London), or to what extent he might have innovated on the contributions of the hymn's other plausible authors.
3. Most of the hymn's original lyrics are an almost-verbatim expression of Roman Catholic dogmas regarding the person of Jesus Christ. As stated elsewhere in this article, the hymn takes almost all its contents from Bible verses and the Nicene Creed. To Irish musicologist William H. Grattan Flood, it is so readily evident that the hymn is merely an artistic expression of the Catholic spiritual and intellectual tradition that he concludes that the words and music of the song "are to be attributed to a Catholic source and for Catholic worship".

=== Tune ===
Besides John Francis Wade, the tune has been attributed to several musicians, from John Reading and his son, to Handel, and even the German composer Christoph Willibald Gluck. The Portuguese composer Marcos Portugal as well as King John IV of Portugal have also been credited. Thomas Arne, whom Wade knew, is another possible composer. There are several similar musical themes written around that time, though it can be hard to determine whether these were written in imitation of the hymn, whether the hymn was based on them, or whether they are totally unconnected.

=== Published versions ===
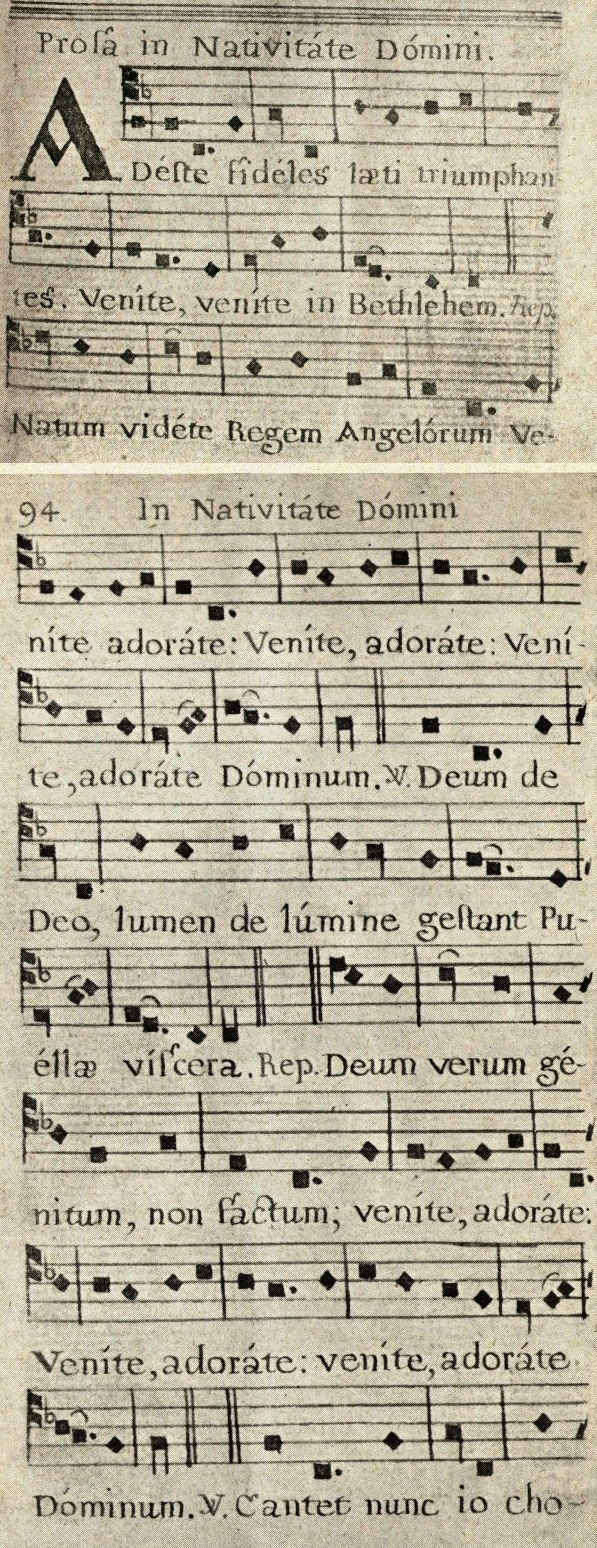
Adeste fideles (earliest printed version)

The hymn was first published by John Francis Wade in his collection Cantus Diversi (1751), with four Latin verses, and music set in the traditional square notation used for medieval liturgical music. This version is in triple meter, contrary to modern versions. It was published again in the 1760 edition of Evening Offices of the Church. It also appeared in Samuel Webbe's An Essay on the Church Plain Chant (1782). The hymn tune also made its way to the Sacred Harp tradition, appearing as "Hither Ye Faithful, Haste with Songs of Triumph" in an 1860 collection. With "Herbei, o ihr Gläub'gen" a German translation of the Latin text was published in 1823 by Friedrich Heinrich Ranke.

== Lyrics ==
The carol has four original Latin verses as published in 1751 by John Francis Wade, plus the traditional metrical English translation by Frederick Oakeley from 1841.

"Adeste Fideles"
Beniamino Gigli and orchestra

Adeste fideles læti triumphantes,
Venite, venite in Bethlehem.
Natum videte
Regem angelorum:
Venite adoremus (3×)
Dominum.

Deum de Deo, lumen de lumine
Gestant puellæ viscera
Deum verum, genitum non factum.
Venite adoremus (3×)
Dominum.

Cantet nunc io, chorus angelorum;
Cantet nunc aula cælestium,
Gloria, gloria in excelsis Deo,
Venite adoremus (3×)
Dominum.

Ergo qui natus die hodierna.
Jesu, tibi sit gloria,
Patris æterni Verbum caro factum.
Venite adoremus (3×)
Dominum.

O come, all ye faithful, joyful and triumphant!
O come ye, O come ye to Bethlehem;
Come and behold Him
Born the King of Angels:
O come, let us adore Him, (3×)
Christ the Lord.

God of God, light of light,
Lo, he abhors not the Virgin's womb;
Very God, begotten, not created:
O come, let us adore Him, (3×)
Christ the Lord.

Sing, choirs of angels, sing in exultation,
Sing, all ye citizens of Heaven above!
Glory to God, glory in the highest:
O come, let us adore Him, (3×)
Christ the Lord.

Yea, Lord, we greet thee, born this happy morning;
Jesus, to thee be glory given!
Word of the Father, now in flesh appearing!
O come, let us adore Him, (3×)
Christ the Lord.

=== Additional lyrics ===
Additional Latin verses were composed for the carol later in the 18th century, though they are not commonly performed. These verses have translations by William Thomas Brooke:

En grege relicto, humiles ad cunas,
Vocati pastores adproperant:
Et nos ovanti gradu festinemus,
Venite adoremus (3×)
Dominum.

Stella duce, Magi Christum adorantes,
Aurum, tus et myrrham dant munera.
Iesu infanti corda præbeamus
Venite adoremus (3×)
Dominum.

Pro nobis egenum et fœno cubantem,
Piis foveamus amplexibus.
Sic nos amantem quis non redamaret?
Venite adoremus (3×)
Dominum.

Æterni Parentis splendorem æternum
Velatum sub carne videbimus
Deum infantem pannis involutum
Venite adoremus (3×)
Dominum.

See how the shepherds, summoned to His cradle,
Leaving their flocks, draw nigh to gaze;
We too will thither bend our joyful footsteps;
O come, let us adore Him, (3×)
Christ the Lord.

Lo! star led chieftains, Magi, Christ adoring,
Offer Him incense, gold, and myrrh;
We to the Christ Child bring our hearts' oblations.
O come, let us adore Him, (3×)
Christ the Lord.

Child, for us sinners poor and in the manger,
We would embrace Thee, with love and awe;
Who would not love Thee, loving us so dearly?
O come, let us adore Him, (3×)
Christ the Lord.

There shall we see Him, His Eternal Father's
Everlasting Brightness now veiled under flesh;
God shall we find there, a Babe in infant clothing;
O come, let us adore Him, (3×)
Christ the Lord.

== Performance ==
"Adeste Fideles" is traditionally the final anthem during Midnight Mass at St. Peter's Basilica in the Vatican.

== See also ==
- List of Christmas carols
