= John Reading (copyist) =

English composer, copyist & organist (c. 1685 – 1764)

- Born: c. 1685/86; England
- Died: 2 September 1764 (aged 77–79); London, England
- Occupations: Composer; arranger; copyist; organist
- Style: Classical

John Reading (c. 1685/86 – 2 September 1764) was an English composer, copyist, and organist (his name, like the town, is pronounced "Redding"—a spelling variant of his name which occurs in several documents). His greatest importance lies in his work as a transcriber, arranger, and copyist of a wide variety of music.

== Life ==
Little is known of Reading's early life. He was probably the son of the composer and organist John Reading (c. 1645–1692) who from 1681 until his death was organist and Master of the Choristers at Winchester College. The younger Reading received the best possible musical training, being a chorister of the Chapel Royal, where he was taught by John Blow. He would almost certainly have sung at the funerals of Henry Purcell and Queen Mary. It was tradition, when the choristers' voices broke, for the Chapel Royal to find them their first appointment. Reading was placed as organist at Dulwich College, a position he held for two years (1700–1702), after which he moved to Lincoln Cathedral, becoming Master of the Choristers there in 1703, a post that his father had previously held. By 1708, he was organist of St John's, Hackney in London, a position he held for some 20 years. This was a church with a strong musical tradition, and one of the first to be furnished with an organ after the Stuart Restoration. In 1727, he became organist of the combined churches of St Mary Woolnoth and St Mary Woolchurch Haw in the City of London. In addition, he took up the post of organist at St Dunstan-in-the-West. He was an early member of the Royal Society of Musicians. He died in London. His portrait hangs in the Dulwich College Art Gallery.

== Historical importance ==
Reading was a notable organist, composer and teacher, but his great contribution to music lies in his activities as a copyist. He lived at a time when musical taste was evolving quickly. The development of English organ music lagged a long way behind that of the continent, but the fantasia and the voluntary were popular forms, and were becoming strongly influenced by the Italian style of Vivaldi and Corelli, whilst the sound of the English organ was being influenced by the sound of the reeds in French organs.

These changes in style were obviously reflected in the organ playing of Reading, because in 1719, a representation was made to him while organist of the Church of St John-at-Hackney about "irregularities relating to the execution of his Office as Organist of this Parish, and particularly for playing the Voluntary too long, and using persistently too light, Airy and Jyggy Tunes, no ways proper to raise the Devotion Suitable for a Religious Assembly." Reading's playing was showing his admiration for the Italian style. In the preface to his A Book of New Songs (1710), he writes of the Italian influence in opera houses in London that "our English composers might be inspired with ye utmost delicacy of a Roman Genius." Although Reading promised to "amend", he was eventually dismissed from his post in Hackney.

Reading must have retained great affection for Dulwich College, where he had his first post, for he donated 12 volumes of his music which he had collected, transcribed and arranged. These volumes, now in the archives in Dulwich, are an important source of English organ music. They also contain psalm settings, harpsichord music and verse anthems, which he had arranged for unison voices. His transcriptions are accurate, and his attributions are reliable. However, he sometimes "improved" upon pieces as he copied them, adding octaves in the bass. He saw the sections of a voluntary as interchangeable, sometimes indicating after an introduction: "follow this with any fugue". The manuscripts often have detailed registration marks, with first movements played on diapasons and second voluntaries marked "Full Organ", followed by a fugue for full organ. Most of his compositions have a seriousness of purpose—far from the frivolity suggested by the reaction of the congregation in Hackney.
