= John Reading (composer, died 1692) =

English composer and organist

John Reading (c. 1645–1692) was an English composer and organist. His son, also John Reading (c. 1685–1764), was another composer and organist, who is now remembered as an important music copyist.

Little of Reading's life is known. He was born in Lincoln, Lincolnshire, and became Master of the Choristers at Lincoln Cathedral in 1670, and in 1675 at Chichester Cathedral and at Winchester Cathedral. From 1681 until his death he was organist at Winchester College. Here he set the college's Latin graces to music as well as the school song Dulce domum. Several of his organ works were included in a collection which was completed by Daniel Roseingrave. He also composed songs, theatre music, and part of a set of responses (now in the Anglican church repertoire in a form completed by modern editors). He died in Winchester.

Cultural offices
Preceded by Thomas Lewis	Organist of Chichester Cathedral; 1675–1677	Succeeded by Samuel Peirson
Preceded by John Turner	Master of the Choristers of Chichester Cathedral; 1675–1677	Succeeded by ?
