= John Francis Wade =

English hymnist (1711–1786)

John Francis Wade (1 January 1711 – 16 August 1786) was an English hymnist who is usually credited with writing and composing the hymn "Adeste Fideles" (which was translated as "O Come All Ye Faithful" in 1841 by Frederick Oakeley). The authorship is disputed, with 13th-century cardinal St. Bonaventure and King John IV of Portugal being proposed as alternative composers, although the earliest known manuscripts of the hymn discovered from 1946 all bear Wade's signature. Others argue for John Reading (c. 1645 – c. 1692) or anonymous Cistercian monks.

Wade fled to France after the Jacobite rising of 1745 was crushed. As a Catholic layman, he lived with exiled English Catholics in France, where he taught music and worked on church music for private use.

== Jacobite symbolism ==
Bennett Zon, Editor of the Yale Journal of Music and Religion, has noted that Wade's Roman Catholic liturgical books were often decorated with Jacobite floral imagery. He argued that the texts had coded Jacobite meanings. He has suggested that the hymn "Adeste Fideles" is a birth ode to Bonnie Prince Charlie, replete with secret references decipherable by the "faithful": the followers of the Pretender, James Francis Edward Stuart.
