= Sir Charles Oakeley, 4th Baronet =

English cricketer

Personal information
- Full name: Charles William Atholl Oakeley
- Born: 25 October 1828; Ealing, Middlesex, England
- Died: 2 November 1915 (aged 87); Tunbridge Wells, Kent, England
- Batting: Unknown

Domestic team information
- Years: Team
- 1848: Oxford University
- 1857: Marylebone Cricket Club

Career statistics
Competition	First-class
Matches	2
Runs scored	26
Batting average	8.66
100s/50s	–/–
Top score	15*
Catches/stumpings	–/–
- Source: Cricinfo, 15 February 2020

Sir Charles William Atholl Oakeley, 4th Baronet JP (25 October 1828 – 2 November 1915) was an English first-class cricketer and an officer in the Bengal Army.

The son of Sir Herbert Oakeley and Atholl Keturah Murray-Aynsley, he was born at Ealing in October 1828. He was educated at Eton College, succeeding his father as the 4th Baronet while studying at Eton in 1845. From Eton, he went up to Christ Church, Oxford. While studying at Oxford, he made a single appearance in first-class cricket for Oxford University against the Marylebone Cricket Club (MCC) at Lord's in 1848. Batting twice in the match, he scored 7 runs in the Oxford first-innings before he was dismissed by Alfred Diver, while in their second-innings he was run out, having scored a single run.

After graduating from Oxford, Oakeley served in the Bengal Army in British India, rising to the rank of captain in the Bengal Cavalry. He made a second appearance in first-class cricket, captaining the MCC against Oxford University at Oxford in 1857. Batting twice in the match, he was dismissed for 3 runs in the MCC first-innings by Cloudesley Marsham, while in their second-innings he was unbeaten on 15. He later served as a justice of the peace for Kent. Oakeley was married twice during his life, firstly to Ellen Parsons in 1860, with the marriage lasting until her death in 1895, and secondly to Elizabeth Tuson in 1896. Oakeley died at Tunbridge Wells in November 1915. He was succeeded as the 5th Baronet by his son, Charles.

Baronetage of Great Britain
Preceded by Sir Herbert Oakeley	Baronet (of Shrewsbury); 1845–1915	Succeeded by Sir Charles Oakeley
