= Serendipity: Accidental Discoveries in Science =

Science book by Royston M. Roberts

- Cover of the first edition
- Author: Royston M. Roberts
- Language: English
- Publisher: John Wiley & Sons, Inc.
- Publication date: 1989
- Publication place: United States
- Media type: Print
- Pages: 270
- ISBN: 0-471-60203-5

Serendipity: Accidental Discoveries in Science is a 1989 popular science book by the chemist Royston M. Roberts. It received positive and mixed reviews; critics found it informative and entertaining, though some indicated that it contained errors.

== Summary ==
In a foreword, the organic chemist and Nobel Prize laureate Derek Barton recounts how, as a first-year graduate student, he accidentally discovered a new process for manufacturing vinyl chloride.

Roberts describes fortuitous accidents that led to breakthroughs in chemistry, physics, engineering, medicine, archaeology, astronomy, and other fields. He distinguishes between true serendipity—"accidental discoveries of things not sought for"—and what he calls pseudoserendipity—"accidental discoveries of ways to achieve an end sought for".

== Background and publication history ==
Roberts was a chemist; in 1944, he and Charles C. Price patented a novel method of synthesising chloroquine. He wrote Serendipity after retiring from a professorship at the University of Texas. His other works include a textbook, Introduction to Modern Experimental Organic Chemistry, and a 1994 children's book co-authored with his daughter Jeanie, Lucky Science: Accidental Discoveries From Gravity to Velcro, with Experiments. He died in 1996.

Serendipity: Accidental Discoveries in Science was first published on July 12, 1989, by John Wiley & Sons, Inc.

== Reception ==
Serendipity was reviewed by Carlos Bamberger in the Oak Ridge National Laboratory Review, Charles Butcher in The Chemical Engineer, Henning Hopf in Angewandte Chemie, George Morton in The Book Report, Arlene Perly Rae in the Toronto Star, Yeshajahu Pomeranz in Cereal Foods World, and O. Bertrand Ramsay in the Journal of Chemical Education.

Bamberger strongly recommended Serendipity "to the general public and especially to science administrators and science teachers". He found the chemistry-related material particularly interesting. He suggested that teachers using the book should highlight that repeated experimentation is necessary to proceed from a lucky observation to a well-understood discovery. In his view, Roberts' stories demonstrated the importance of allowing researchers time and resources to investigate serendipitous observations. Butcher called the book "a straightforward account of some of the more interesting episodes in the history of science". He commended Roberts' presentation of chemistry, describing him as the equal of Isaac Asimov. He remarked that Roberts had made historical errors such as crediting Christopher Columbus with the development of civilisation in the Americas and overstating Edward Jenner's role in combatting smallpox. He questioned whether scientific advances could be neatly categorised as either serendipitous or non-serendipitous, since in his view all discoveries required "creative leaps".

Hopf wrote that the book was a collection of colourful anecdotes. He described it as useful from a pedagogical standpoint, even if perhaps not historically accurate. He criticised the abundance of printing and other errors. Morton highly recommended the book. He considered it well written and organised and accessible to high-school students. Perly Rae found the book readable and fascinating, but suggested that Roberts had overlooked the contributions of female inventors. Pomeranz praised the book as "fascinating, dramatic, and amusing". He recommended it to readers of all ages and knowledge levels. Ramsay considered Roberts' writing style informative and engaging, but wrote that many of Roberts' stories had already appeared in other works such as Alfred B. Garrett's The Flash of Genius. He found the bibliography lacking; in particular, he stated that Roberts' description of August Kekulé gaining insights about chemical structures from dreams ought to have drawn more upon the work of scholars who questioned this account.

== Sources ==
- Bamberger, Carlos (1990). "Books". Oak Ridge National Laboratory Review. 23 (1): 62–63. ISSN 0048-1262.
- Butcher, Charles (December 1989). "Christmas Books". The Chemical Engineer (467): 58. ISSN 0302-0797.
- "People: Deaths". Chemical & Engineering News. 75 (2): 36. 13 January 1997. doi:10.1021/cen-v075n002.p036. ISSN 0009-2347.
- Hopf, Henning (September 1990). "Book Reviews". Angewandte Chemie International Edition in English. 29 (9): 1069. doi:10.1002/anie.199010691.
- "Lucky Science". Kirkus Reviews. 15 December 1994.
- Morton, George (January–February 1990). "Reviews". The Book Report. 8 (4): 63. ISSN 0731-4388.
- Perly Rae, Arlene (3 March 1990). "Mothers of Invention Sorely Neglected". Toronto Star. p. M6. ISSN 0319-0781.
- Pomeranz, Y. (December 1990). "Book Reviews". Cereal Foods World. 35 (12): 1216. ISSN 0146-6283.
- Ramsay, O. Bertrand (December 1990). "Reviews". Journal of Chemical Education. 67 (12): A311. doi:10.1021/ed067pA311.1. ISSN 0021-9584.
- Roberts, Royston M. (1989). Serendipity: Accidental Discoveries in Science. New York: John Wiley & Sons, Inc. ISBN 978-0-471-60203-3. Archive.org
