= Happy Hearts =

Happy Hearts may refer to:

- Happy Hearts (1932 film), a French comedy film
- Happy Hearts (2007 film), a Philippine romantic-comedy film

== See also ==
- Happy Heart, a song by Petula Clark, and by Andy Williams
- Happy Heart (album), an album by Andy Williams
