= Live and Learn =

Live and Learn may refer to:

== Music ==
=== Albums ===
- Live and Learn (Elkie Brooks album), 1979
- Live and Learn, a 1986 album by Paul Smith
- Live & Learn (Daryl Stuermer album), 1998
- Live & Learn, a 2000 album by Indo G
- Live & Learn (Vixen album), 2006, or the title track
- Live and Learn (House of Fools album), 2007

=== Songs ===
- "Live and Learn" (Andy Williams song), 1969
- "Live and Learn" (Clannad song), 1988
- "Live and Learn" (Kylie Minogue song), 1991
- "Live and Learn" (Joe Public song), 1992
- "Live & Learn" (Crush 40 song), from the 2001 video game Sonic Adventure 2
- "Live and Learn" (The Cardigans song), 2003

== Other ==
- Live and Learn, a 1951 short directed by Sid Davis
- Live and Learn (TV series), a Canadian educational television series
- "Live and Learn" (Falling Skies), an episode of Falling Skies
- "Live and Learn", an episode of the television series MacGyver
- "Live and Learn", a 1990 episode of the television series The Cosby Show
- "Live and Learn", an episode of the television series Power Rangers Ninja Steel
- "Live and Learn", an episode of the television series The Real Housewives of Beverly Hills
