= A Woman's Way =

A Woman's Way may refer to:

- "A Woman's Way" (song), 1969, by Andy Williams
- A Woman's Way (1908 film), an American silent short drama film
- A Woman's Way (1916 film), a film produced by World Film
- A Woman's Way (1928 film), an American silent drama film

== See also ==
- Women's Way, a U.S. nonprofit organization
