= Yeshajahu Pomeranz =

Food scientist

Yeshajahu Pomeranz (Hebrew: ישעיהו פומרנץ; 1922–1995) was an Israeli-American food scientist.

== Early life and education ==
Pomeranz was born on 28 November 1922 in Poland to Rysia (née Bildner) and Dovid Pomeranz. He received bachelor's degrees from the Israel Institute of Technology in chemistry and chemical engineering in 1944 and 1945. He obtained a master's degree in chemical engineering from the University of London, and a doctorate in grain science and milling from Kansas State University.

== Career ==
In 1982 he received a grant from the Alexander von Humboldt Foundation to conduct research in West Germany. He was editor-in-chief of Cereal Chemistry from 1985 to 1992.

== Personal life and death ==
Pomeranz married an elementary school teacher from Israel and had two sons. He died of brain cancer on 21 July 1995, aged 72.

== Awards and honours ==
- Wiley Award (1980) from the Association of Official Analytical Chemists
- Thomas Burr Osborne Medal (1980) and William F. Geddes Memorial Award (1982) from the American Association of Cereal Chemists
- USDA Distinguished Service Award (1983)
- Award for advancement of application of agricultural and food chemistry (1984) from the Agriculture and Food Division of the American Chemical Society

== Selected publications ==
=== Books ===
- Pomeranz, Y.; Meloan, Clifton E. (1971). Food Analysis: Theory and Practice. Westport, Connecticut: AVI Pub. Co. ISBN 9780870551000.
- Pomeranz, Yeshajahu (1971). Bread Science and Technology. Avi Publishing. ISBN 9780870551048.
- Pomeranz, Y.; Hlynka, Isydore (1978). Wheat: Chemistry and Technology (Rev. ed.). American Association of Cereal Chem. ISBN 978-0-913250-00-6.
- Pomeranz, Y. (1985). Functional Properties of Food Components. Orlando, Florida: Academic Press. ISBN 9780125612807.
- Pomeranz, Yeshajahu, ed. (2009) [1988]. Wheat: Chemistry And Technology. American Association of Cereal Chemists. ISBN 9780913250730.
- Pomeranz, Yeshajahu, ed. (1989). Wheat is Unique: Structure, Composition, Processing, End-Use Properties, and Products. American Association of Cereal Chemists. ISBN 9780913250686.

=== Articles ===
- Pomeranz, Yeshajahu; Robbins, George S.; Briggle, Lee W. (May 1971). "Amino acid composition of oat groats". Journal of Agricultural and Food Chemistry. 19 (3): 536–539. Bibcode:1971JAFC...19..536P. doi:10.1021/jf60175a016.
- Pomeranz, Yeshajahu; Robbins, George S. (March 1972). "Amino acid composition of buckwheat". Journal of Agricultural and Food Chemistry. 20 (2): 270–274. Bibcode:1972JAFC...20..270P. doi:10.1021/jf60180a029.
