= Saul Rae =

Canadian diplomat

Saul Forbes Rae
- Born: Saul Forbes Rae; December 31, 1914; Hamilton, Ontario, Canada
- Died: January 9, 1999 (aged 84); Ottawa, Ontario, Canada
- Occupation: Diplomat
- Spouse: Lois Esther George
- Children: John, Bob, Jennifer, David
- Parent(s): Goodman Rae (Cohen) and Helen Rae

Saul Forbes Rae (December 31, 1914 – January 9, 1999) was a Canadian diplomat during the Pearsonian era of Canadian foreign policy.

== Life and career ==
Rae's father was born Goodman Cohen in Palanga, Lithuania. The Cohen family had moved to Scotland fleeing the pogroms of the 1890s, and there Goodman met Helen Rae, the daughter of a metal plater in the Glasgow shipyards. The romance and subsequent marriage caused considerable turmoil in both families. Cohen adopted his wife's surname, and the couple decided to move to Winnipeg, Manitoba in 1912.

Saul was born in Hamilton, Ontario on December 31, 1914. He had two siblings, an older sister, Grace, who went to work as a dancer at the Radio City Music Hall, and a younger brother Jackie who had a long career in Canadian show business. The three worked in vaudeville in Canada in the 1920s under the name "the three little Raes of Sunshine". He converted to Anglicanism.

Saul Rae graduated from Jarvis Collegiate, then from University College at the University of Toronto in 1936, and went on to earn a doctorate from the London School of Economics as a Massey Fellow.

He also studied at Balliol College, Oxford, and went on to lecture at Princeton University where he worked at the American Institute of Public Opinion. He was a pioneering public opinion researcher co-authoring with George Gallup on the 1940 book The Pulse of Democracy: Public Opinion and How It Works.

He married Lois Esther George in 1939. She was the daughter of Stanley George, a Hampstead general medical practitioner, and Mildred, whose family was from Watford, England. She had studied at Newnham College, Cambridge. The two met at a summer school organized by Sir Norman Angell in Geneva, Switzerland, and were married in Baltimore, Maryland at the outbreak of the Second World War.

Saul Rae joined the Department of External Affairs in 1940, and would spend four decades with the civil service as a career diplomat. Rae was one of the first diplomats to serve in Paris after its liberation in 1944, having served as assistant to General Georges Vanier, Canada's representative to the Free French in Algiers.

In 1955, he worked on the International Commission for Supervision and Control in Vietnam as deputy to the Canadian Commissioner, Sherwood Lett. The role of the commission was to supervise the peace settlement at the end of the First Indochina War.

He later served as Canadian Minister in the United States (Washington DC 1956–1961) and was Canada's Ambassador to the UN in both Geneva and New York (1972-1976) - the latter a role to which his son Bob was appointed in July 2020.

He served as Ambassador to Mexico (1967-1972), and to the Netherlands (1976-1979). He retired in 1980 after suffering a series of small strokes.

== Family ==
Saul and Lois Rae had four children:

- Jennifer Rae (born 1943) worked at IMAX for many years, and was active in politics with her brothers John and Bob.
- John A. Rae (born 1945) was a senior adviser to Jean Chrétien, and was a long-time executive with Power Corporation.
- Bob Rae (born 1948) lawyer, was leader of the Ontario New Democratic Party, Premier of Ontario, a federal MP, and later interim leader of the Liberal Party of Canada. He was appointed as the Canadian ambassador to the United Nations in 2020.
- David Rae (1957-1989) served as Canadian president of GE Capital, and died in 1989, aged 32, of lymphoma.

Saul's brother, the late Jackie Rae was an entertainer and former host of The Jackie Rae Show on CBC.

Diplomatic posts
Preceded by Yvon Beaulne	Canadian Ambassador to the United Nations; July 1972 – July 1976	Succeeded by William Hickson Barton
Preceded by Herbert Frederick Brooks-Hill Feaver	Canadian Ambassador to Mexico; 1967-1972	Succeeded by Maurice Schwarzmann
Preceded by TBD	Canadian Ambassador to the Netherlands; 1976-1979	Succeeded by Georges-Henri Blouin
