= Happy Heart (album) =

Studio album by Andy Williams
- Released: 1969
- Recorded: 1969
- Genre: traditional pop; vocal pop; soft rock
- Length: 36:59
- Label: Columbia
- Producer: Jerry Fuller

Andy Williams chronology
The Andy Williams Sound of Music (1969)	Happy Heart (1969)	Get Together with Andy Williams (1969)

Singles from Happy Heart
- 1. "Happy Heart" Released: March 14, 1969

Happy Heart is the twenty-third studio album by American pop singer Andy Williams, released in the spring of 1969 by Columbia Records and continued the trend of his recent albums in relying exclusively on contemporary material. This project eschewed offerings from Broadway and Hollywood that had been predominant on his LPs with Columbia.

The album was released on compact disc as one of two albums on one CD by Collectables Records in 1999, along with Williams's Columbia release from 1968, Honey. This same pairing was also released as two albums on one CD by Sony Music Distribution in 2000. The Collectables CD was included in a box set titled Classic Album Collection, Vol. 1, which contains 17 of his studio albums and three compilations and was released on June 26, 2001.

== Chart performance ==
The album made its first appearance on the Top LP's chart in the issue of Billboard magazine dated May 17, 1969, and remained there for 23 weeks, peaking at number nine. It also debuted on the Cashbox albums chart in the issue dated May 17, 1969, and remained on the chart for 16 weeks, peaking at number six. It entered the UK album chart on July 26, 1969, and reached number 22 over the course of 10 weeks, and the Recording Industry Association of America awarded the album Gold certification on August 20, 1969.

The title song from the album had been released as a single that March and entered the Easy Listening chart in the issue of Billboard dated April 5, 1969, spending 14 weeks there and two of those weeks at number one. The song entered the Billboard Hot 100 one week later and reached number 22 over the course of 11 weeks. number 26 on the Cashbox singles chart during its eleven weeks there. In the UK it entered the singles chart for the week of May 10 that year and stayed there for 10 weeks, peaking at number 19.

== Reception ==
Professional ratings
Review scores
Source	Rating
AllMusic	2.5/5 stars
The Encyclopedia of Popular Music	4/5 stars
Record Mirror	4/5 stars

William Ruhlmann of AllMusic thought the album "didn't really differ much in its approach from Williams' previous album, Honey, which also contained nearly all pop covers. The only real difference was that this time Williams was not waiting so long. "My Way" was just peaking in the charts for Frank Sinatra, for example, as was Elvis Presley's "Memories," and Glen Campbell's "Where's the Playground Susie" had only just come out."

Billboard magazine wrote, "Andy Williams has taken the best of the current hits and in his own warm, sophisticated style makes them sound completely new and exciting. The program is a harvest of first rate material." Cashbox notes Williams "maintains his heavy sales appeal with this offering." Record World said the album showed Andy 'singing some of the more recent clicks sometimes with more souling that his usual."

American Record Guide claims "It all adds up to pleasant listening, which has always been Andy's bag." Record Mirror noted Williams' "cool vocals still have that touch of swing and the benefit of years of experience", giving the album a four-star ratings. It received the same rating from The Encyclopedia of Popular Music, while getting a lower two-and-a-half-star rating from AllMusic.

== Track listing ==
=== Side one ===
1. "For Once in My Life" (Ron Miller, Orlando Murden) – 2:54
2. "Where's the Playground, Susie?" (Jimmy Webb) – 2:51
3. "My Way" (Paul Anka, Claude François, Jacques Revaux) – 3:43
4. "Wichita Lineman" (Webb) – 2:55
5. "Happy Heart" (Jackie Rae, James Last) – 3:15
6. "Gentle on My Mind" (John Hartford) – 3:10

=== Side two ===
1. "Didn't We?" (Webb) – 3:27
2. "Memories" (Billy Strange, Mac Davis) – 3:47
3. "Little Green Apples" (Bobby Russell) – 4:03
4. "Here, There and Everywhere" (John Lennon, Paul McCartney) – 3:15
5. "Abraham, Martin and John" (Dick Holler) – 3:43

== Charts ==
Chart peaks for Happy Heart
Chart (1969)	Peak position
US Top LPs (Billboard)	9
US Cashbox Top 100 Albums	6
UK Record Retailer Albums Chart	22

=== Singles ===
Title	Year	U.S. Hot 100	U.S. Cashbox	U.S. AC	UK singles
"Happy Heart"	1969	22	26	1	19

== Personnel ==
From the liner notes for the original album:

- Andy Williams – vocals
- Jerry Fuller – producer
- Al Capps – arranger
- Peter Romano – engineer (except where noted)
- Phil Macy – engineer ("Happy Heart")
- Frank Bez – back cover photo
- Barry Feinstein – front cover photo
