= Bob Rae =

Canadian politician and diplomat (born 1948)

The Honourable Bob Rae PC CC OOnt ECO KC
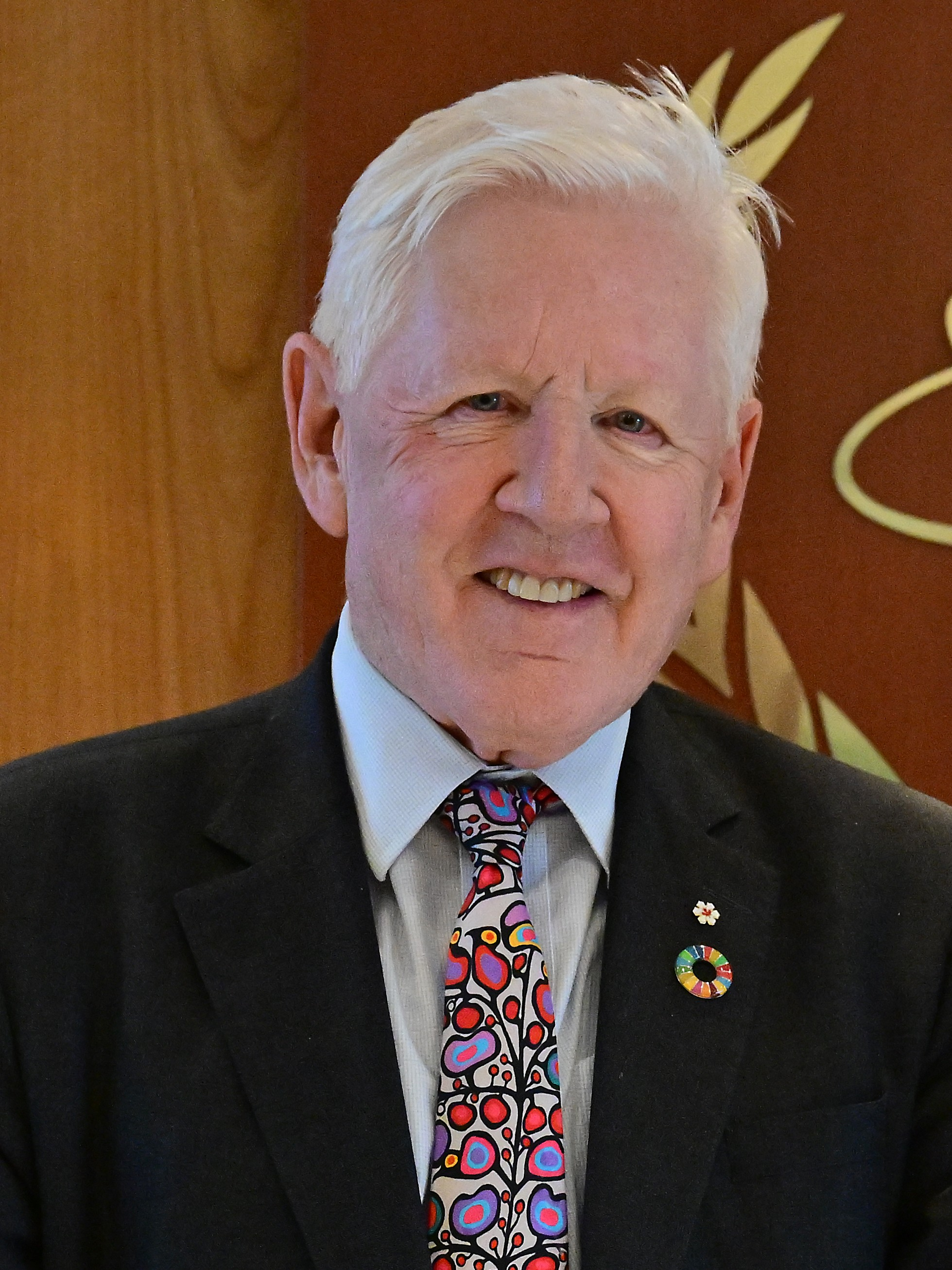
- Rae in 2025

25th Canadian Ambassador to the United Nations
- In office August 1, 2020 – November 17, 2025
- Prime Minister: Justin Trudeau; Mark Carney
- Preceded by: Marc-André Blanchard
- Succeeded by: David Lametti

Vice-President of the Assembly of States Parties of the International Criminal Court
- In office 2021–2023
- Appointed by: Assembly of States Parties
- Preceded by: Michal Mlynár
- Succeeded by: Michael Kanu

Leader of the Liberal Party
- Interim; May 25, 2011 – April 14, 2013
- Preceded by: Michael Ignatieff
- Succeeded by: Justin Trudeau

21st Premier of Ontario
- In office October 1, 1990 – June 26, 1995
- Monarch: Elizabeth II
- Lieutenant Governor: Lincoln Alexander; Hal Jackman
- Deputy: Floyd Laughren
- Preceded by: David Peterson
- Succeeded by: Mike Harris

Leader of the Ontario New Democratic Party
- In office February 7, 1982 – June 22, 1996
- Preceded by: Michael Cassidy
- Succeeded by: Howard Hampton

Leader of the Official Opposition
- In office September 10, 1987 – October 1, 1990
- Preceded by: Larry Grossman
- Succeeded by: Robert Nixon
Parliamentary constituencies
Member of Parliament for Toronto Centre
In office March 17, 2008 – July 31, 2013
Preceded by	Bill Graham
Succeeded by	Chrystia Freeland
Member of Provincial Parliament for York South
In office November 4, 1982 – February 29, 1996
Preceded by	Donald MacDonald
Succeeded by	Gerard Kennedy
Member of Parliament for Broadview—Greenwood Broadview (1978–1979)
In office October 16, 1978 – May 2, 1982
Preceded by	John Gilbert
Succeeded by	Lynn McDonald

Personal details
- Born: Robert Keith Rae; August 2, 1948 (age 78) Ottawa, Ontario, Canada
- Party: Liberal (1968; since 2006); New Democratic (1974–1998)
- Other political affiliations: Ontario New Democratic (1974–1998)
- Spouse: Arlene Perly (m. 1980)
- Children: 3
- Parent: Saul Rae (father)
- Relatives: Jackie Rae (uncle), John A. Rae (brother)
- Education: University of Toronto (BA, LLB); Balliol College, Oxford (BPhil)
- Profession: Lawyer; academic
- Website: pm.gc.ca/en/news/backgrounders/2020/07/06/honourable-bob-rae

Robert Keith Rae (born August 2, 1948) is a Canadian politician and diplomat who served as the Canadian Ambassador to the United Nations from 2020 to 2025. Rae previously served as the 21st premier of Ontario from 1990 to 1995, leader of the Ontario New Democratic Party from 1982 to 1996, and interim leader of the Liberal Party of Canada from 2011 to 2013. Between 1978 and 2013, he was elected 11 times to federal and provincial parliaments. Since December 2025, Rae has been serving as the Visitor of Massey College.

Rae was a New Democratic Party (NDP) member of Parliament (MP) from 1978 to 1982. He then moved to provincial politics, serving as leader of the Ontario NDP from 1982 to 1996. After leading his party to victory in the 1990 provincial election, he served as the 21st premier of Ontario from 1990 to 1995. He was the first person to lead a provincial NDP government east of Manitoba. While in office, he brought forward initiatives which were unpopular with traditional NDP supporters, such as the Social Contract Act. Rae's government was heavily defeated in the 1995 provincial election. His subsequent disagreement with the leftward direction of the NDP led him to resign his membership.

In 2006, Rae joined the Liberals; he had previously been a Liberal in the late 1960s and early 1970s. That year, Rae was a candidate for the leadership of the Liberal Party, but was eliminated after placing third on the third ballot. He returned to the House of Commons in 2008 as a Liberal MP after winning a by-election. He was re-elected in the 2008 federal election. Rae ran again for party leadership in the 2009 leadership race, but withdrew in December 2008. He was re-elected in the 2011 federal election and was named interim leader of the Liberal Party after Michael Ignatieff resigned his leadership; he served in that position until Justin Trudeau's election as party leader in 2013.

In June 2013, Rae announced his resignation from Parliament in order to become chief negotiator for James Bay area First Nations in their negotiations with the provincial government. His resignation became effective that July. Rae joined Olthuis Kleer Townshend LLP, a law firm specializing in representing aboriginal clients, as a partner in 2014. He sits as an advisor to Canada's Ecofiscal Commission. Rae was Canada's special envoy to Myanmar from October 2017 to April 2018 and advised Prime Minister Justin Trudeau on the Rohingya crisis. He is also a Senior Fellow to the Raoul Wallenberg Centre for Human Rights and a Distinguished Fellow at the Munk School at the University of Toronto. In July 2020, Rae's appointment as the Canadian Ambassador to the United Nations was announced by Prime Minister Trudeau. He served until November 2025.

== Family ==
Rae was born in Ottawa, Ontario. His parents were Lois Esther (George) and Saul Rae, an eminent Canadian career diplomat who had postings in Washington, Geneva, New York, Mexico, and The Hague. Rae's paternal grandparents immigrated from Scotland, and his mother had English ancestry. Rae was raised as an Anglican. As an adult, he found out that his paternal grandfather was Jewish and was from a family of Lithuanian immigrants to Scotland.

Rae's elder brother John A. Rae (born 1945) was an executive vice-president and director of Power Corporation and a prominent member of the Liberal Party. He was also an adviser to Jean Chrétien when he was Indian Affairs Minister in 1968, and then again from 1993 until 2003 while Chrétien was prime minister. Rae's younger brother, David, was diagnosed with lymphatic cancer in 1987. Despite a bone marrow transplant from his brother, he died of leukemia in 1989 at age 32.

Rae learned of his family's Jewish origins in 1968. The revelation had a strong impact on him: he sought to explore his Jewish culture, dated Jewish girls exclusively and ultimately married a Jewish woman. Upon his marriage to Arlene Perly Rae, Rae agreed to raise their three daughters in his wife's Jewish faith. Rae is a member of Holy Blossom Temple, a Reform Jewish congregation in Toronto.

His uncle, the late Jackie Rae, was an entertainer and former host of The Jackie Rae Show on CBC and also performed on British television.

== Early career ==
Rae attended Crichton Street Public School in Ottawa, Horace Mann Public School and Gordon Junior High School in Washington, D.C. (1956–1961), and the International School of Geneva, Switzerland. His first job was a paper route delivering the Washington's Evening Star newspaper, which he later described as "one of the worst newspapers in the history of modern journalism". His customers included Richard Nixon and Estes Kefauver. Rae later joked that Kefauver gave him a $20 tip one Christmas, whereas Pat Nixon only gave him a quarter and made him more sympathetic to Democrats from that moment.

Rae graduated with honours from University College, University of Toronto, where he also later received his law degree. Michael Ignatieff, who later became Rae's rival for the Liberal Party leadership, was his roommate for a time. He first became involved in politics by volunteering on Trudeau's 1968 Liberal leadership campaign, and later worked on Liberal Charles Caccia's campaign in the 1968 federal election. Rae and Caccia have remained personal friends through their political careers. During his final year as an undergraduate, Rae was a student representative on the Bissell Commission on University Government.

As a result of his strong student record, Rae was awarded a Rhodes Scholarship to the University of Oxford, where he studied at Balliol College, Oxford under Isaiah Berlin. His Bachelor of Philosophy thesis criticized the cultural imperialism of early Fabian socialists in the United Kingdom, such as Sidney and Beatrice Webb. During his period in Britain he became involved with social work, helping squatters find rental accommodation in London. He attributes the experience with helping him develop a deepened commitment to social justice and, on his return to Canada in 1974 Rae joined the social democratic NDP. He worked in labour law during the mid-1970s.

== Political career ==
=== Federal New Democratic MP ===
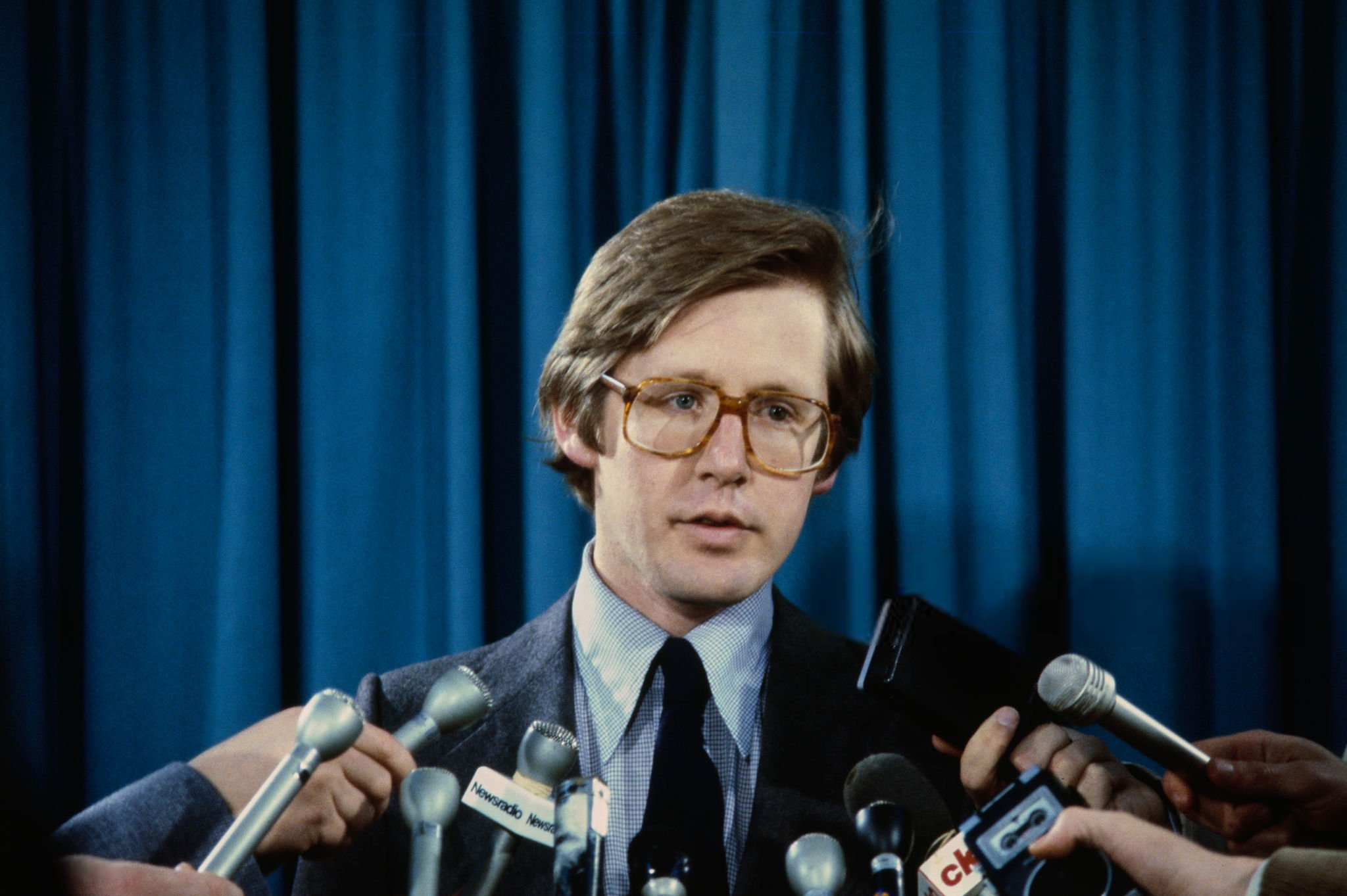
Rae speaks at a press conference, 1980

Rae was elected to the House of Commons of Canada in a 1978 by-election, defeating Progressive Conservative Tom Clifford by 420 votes in the Toronto riding of Broadview. Rae won the NDP nomination over former MP John Paul Harney and activist Kay Macpherson.

He won a full term in the 1979 federal election from the renamed riding of Broadview—Greenwood, and gained national prominence as the NDP's finance critic. When Clark's proposed budget came up for debate that December, Rae introduced a subamendment stating that the House of Commons did not approve of the budget. It was this motion's passage that toppled Clark's government after only eight months.

Rae was elected to parliament for a third time in the 1980 federal election, and married Arlene Perly days later. In caucus, he sided with party leader Ed Broadbent in supporting patriation of the Canadian Constitution with a Charter of Rights and Freedoms. He also articulated his party's policy on the Canadian Bank Act, and criticized the Bank of Canada's high interest rate policy.

=== Ontario NDP leader ===
During the same period Rae was in Ottawa, the Ontario New Democratic Party was suffering from internal disunity under the leadership of Michael Cassidy. Cassidy resigned as leader after a poor performance in the 1981 provincial election, and a movement began to draft Rae as his replacement. Rae initially declined a request from a provincial delegation led by Member of Provincial Parliament (MPP) Dave Cooke, but reconsidered after further entreaties from former Ontario NDP leader Stephen Lewis and many others.

Eleven of the party's 21 MPPs endorsed his candidacy, as did much of the labour movement. Rae's supporters in caucus were Marion Bryden, Brian Charlton, Dave Cooke, Odoardo Di Santo, Tony Grande, Donald C. MacDonald, Robert Mackenzie, Elie Martel, Ed Philip, George Samis and Mel Swart. He was the most centrist candidate in the contest, and easily defeated Richard Johnston and Jim Foulds at a leadership convention in early 1982.

When Rae won the NDP leadership, the Ontario Progressive Conservative Party had governed Ontario since 1943 and was widely regarded as unbeatable. Rae was strongly critical of the Bill Davis government's approach to social issues, and used his acceptance speech to describe the PC Party's Ontario as "Toryland", "essentially a country club in which women and people of colour were not welcome". His comments were criticized by some in the media, though Rae himself would later write that his words seemed "particularly apt" in retrospect and "certainly aroused an angry response which often means a target has been hit".

==== First session ====
After Rae won the party leadership, there was a delay of several months before he was able to contest a by-election to enter the Ontario legislature. Members of Provincial Parliament (MPPs) Jim Renwick, Marion Bryden and Tony Grande all declined to relinquish their seats, before former party leader Donald C. MacDonald agreed to stand down in the York South constituency. Rae defeated Liberal candidate John Nunziata, a York councillor in a by-election on November 4, 1982. Counting the leadership contest, this was his fifth election in just over four years.

The opposition Liberals were led by the inexperienced David Peterson. Many senior NDP strategists believed their party could surpass the Liberals for second place, and Rae and Peterson became frequent rivals for media attention and public support between 1982 and 1985. The NDP took two seats from the Liberals in late 1984 by-elections, and polling by Decima Research from this period put them slightly ahead of the Liberals, although still well behind the PCs.

==== 1985 election and the Liberal–NDP accord ====
The NDP did not make the anticipated gains in the 1985 provincial election held on May 2, 1985. They won 25 seats out of 125, only a modest improvement from their 1981 showing. The Progressive Conservatives lost support after Davis retired and right-wing candidate Frank Miller was chosen as their new leader. However, it was the Liberals rather than the NDP who were able to reposition themselves in the political centre and reap the benefits of this change.

Rae nonetheless played a pivotal role in bringing the Progressive Conservative Party's 42-year dynasty to an end. The 1985 election resulted in a minority parliament, in which the Tories held four more seats than David Peterson's Liberals, but were eleven seats short of a majority. Rae entered into negotiations with both Premier Miller and Peterson, the latter begun by a phone call from Rae to Peterson shortly after election day. Rae and Peterson signed a "Liberal-NDP Accord" in which the NDP agreed to support a Liberal government in office for two years. The Liberals, in turn, agreed to implement some policies favoured by the NDP. Rae had personally supported a full coalition, but did not strongly argue this case with other members of his party. Peterson later indicated that he would not have accepted a coalition in any event.

The Progressive Conservatives were defeated in a no-confidence motion on June 18, 1985, and Lieutenant-Governor John Black Aird asked Peterson to form a new government. Rae himself moved the motion of non-confidence, as he had done in the defeat of Joe Clark's government six years earlier. With support from Rae, Peterson's minority government implemented socially progressive legislation on matters such as pay equity, brought an end to extra-billing by doctors, and established campaign spending limits. Rae often criticized Peterson's approach to specific issues, but never moved to bring down the government.

Rae advocated pension reform in early 1986, following revelations that some corporate leaders in Ontario had been given permission to withdraw money from their employees' pension funds. He was especially critical of Conrad Black, who then held a controlling interest in Dominion Stores Ltd., for withdrawing $62 million at a time when many laid off company workers were unable to receive severance pay. During a legislative debate, Rae described Black as "that most symbolic representative of bloated capitalism at its worst". The Liberal government declined to act on the matter. Later in the same year, Rae argued that the Peterson government should reform the Ontario Human Rights Code to include provisions for group defamation and systematic discrimination.

Some members of the NDP disapproved of the party's accord with the Liberals. Party activist Ian Orenstein challenged Rae for the provincial leadership in 1986 in a symbolic protest against the party's centrist tilt. Rae won without difficulty.

==== Leader of the Opposition ====
Peterson's minority government was very popular during its two years in office, and the Liberal Party won a landslide majority government in the 1987 provincial election, called after the conclusion of the Liberal-NDP accord. The NDP was reduced to nineteen seats and Rae was nearly defeated in his own riding, defeating high-profile Liberal challenger Alan Tonks by only 333 votes. The Progressive Conservatives under Larry Grossman suffered an even more serious defeat, falling to only sixteen seats. As a result, Rae became Leader of the Opposition once the legislature resumed.

In September 1989, Rae took part in a highly publicized protest in support of native land claims in the middle of the Temagami Forest in Northern Ontario. Following discussions with Chief Gary Potts, Rae agreed to participate in a road sit-in to protect a strand of old pine, a key aspect of the native claim. After the protest, Rae was escorted to a police wagon by members of the Ontario Provincial Police and driven to the nearby town of Elk Lake. He was not charged with an offense.

There was considerable speculation that Rae would seek the federal NDP leadership in 1989, after the resignation of Ed Broadbent. High-profile party members such as former Ontario NDP leader Stephen Lewis, Allan Blakeney and Roy Romanow of Saskatchewan, Gary Doer of Manitoba and Alexa McDonough of Nova Scotia all encouraged him to run, as did several representatives of organized labour. Expecting Rae to resign, Bud Wildman, Ruth Grier and Richard Johnston began preparing campaigns to succeed him as leader of the Ontario NDP. On October 5, 1989, however, Rae announced that he would not return to federal politics and would remain as provincial leader. Several of Rae's associates, including Arlene Perly Rae, declared their support for Howard McCurdy, and later moved to Audrey McLaughlin after McCurdy was dropped from the ballot at the leadership convention. Rae declined to endorse a candidate.

Rae was an international observer for Lithuania's first multi-party elections in early 1990. A lifelong opponent of communism, he later wrote that he was impressed by the spirit of the opposition Sąjūdis party, which won the election. He was also very critical of the Kremlin's harsh response to the opposition's victory.

==== Election victory ====
Peterson called a snap election for 1990. The NDP entered the campaign with low expectations, as the Liberals still held a significant lead in opinion polls and all signs indicated that they would win another majority government. Rae later acknowledged that he did not expect to win the election, and planned to leave electoral politics at some point in the next sitting of the legislature. A number of prominent MPPs, including Richard Johnston, Marion Bryden and David Reville, chose not to seek re-election. Floyd Laughren was also planning to retire, but had not finalized his plans when Peterson dropped the writ.

Contrary to expectations, the Liberal Party's support base declined significantly in mid-campaign. The snap election was unpopular, and the Liberals suffered lingering effects from an earlier scandal involving Liberal fundraiser Patti Starr undermined public confidence in the government. Peterson's prominent role in drafting and supporting the troubled Meech Lake Accord for constitutional reform proved a particular liability. There were also signs of an economic downturn by this time and some believed that Peterson had called the snap election to avoid its full impact. The Progressive Conservatives were led by the inexperienced Mike Harris, who ran a narrow campaign focused on tax issues and was unable to capitalize on the Liberal slide. As such, Rae's NDP was the primary beneficiary. Rae himself was more confident than in the 1985 and 1987 campaigns, and took a more aggressive stance against the Peterson government. A poll taken late in the campaign showed the NDP holding a slight lead over the Liberals.

The election results were nonetheless a surprise to political observers across the province, even to longtime NDP supporters. The NDP was elected to a strong majority government with 74 seats. The popular vote was very close, with the NDP outpolling the Liberals 37% to 34%. Several ridings were won by narrow margins. However, the NDP managed to take many seats from the Liberals in the Greater Toronto Area, and also did better than ever before (or in some cases, since) in many other cities and rural areas. Due to the nature of the first-past-the-post electoral system, which ignores the popular vote and only awards power based on the number of ridings won, this decimated the Liberal caucus. The Liberals lost 59 seats, the worst defeat in their history and the second-worst defeat for a governing party in Ontario. The NDP even managed to unseat Peterson in his own riding.

=== Premier ===
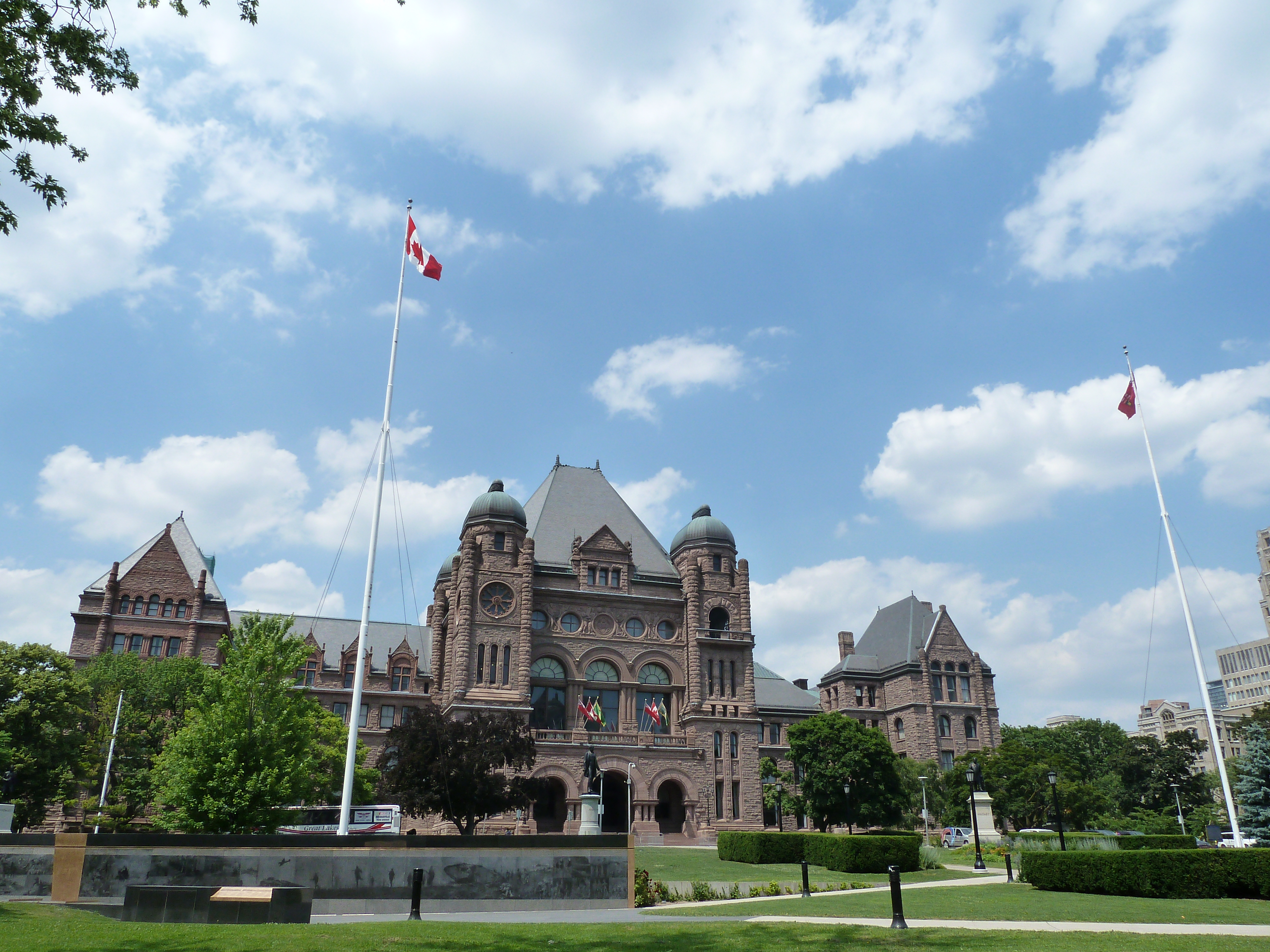
The Ontario Legislative Building, from which Rae governed Ontario as the first NDP premier of the province

On October 1, 1990, Rae was sworn in as the first, and to date the only, New Democratic premier of Ontario. He also took the Intergovernmental Affairs portfolio, giving himself a direct voice in future constitutional negotiations.

Bob Rae was in power for 1650 days, the longest term for an Ontario premier since the Second World War. He became one of the few Ontario premiers who could speak French.

He was very popular for his first six months as Premier, with a poll from March 1991 showing the NDP at 52% support. The federal NDP also received 56% support in Ontario in a January 1991 poll.

The government was unable to sustain its popularity, however, and by late 1992 had fallen to third place in public opinion polls. The party's popularity continued to ebb throughout 1993, followed by only a modest recovery in the next two years. This, among other factors, partially contributed to a significant decline in support for the federal NDP.

There are many reasons for the Rae government's loss of popularity between 1991 and 1993. The NDP had never governed Ontario before, and Ontario was experiencing its worst recession since the Great Depression. The government backtracked on several campaign promises, most notably the introduction of public auto insurance, which caused disagreements among the party and supporters, especially from members of the progressive wing of the party such as cabinet ministers Howard Hampton and Shelley Martel. A number of scandals in cabinet and caucus due to the large number of rookie MPPs also cut into the government's popularity.

In the 1993 federal election, the NDP fell to a historic low of 6% support in Ontario. All 10 New Democrat MPs from Ontario lost their seats to Liberal challengers as the Liberals won all but one seat in the province. Besides many NDP supporters nationwide voting Liberal to ensure that the Conservatives would be defeated (to avoid the vote-splitting of the 1988 election), the Rae government's unpopularity was a major factor in the federal NDP's losses. On the day after the election, defeated MP Steven Langdon called on Rae to resign. Langdon had openly campaigned against Rae's austerity measures. Although he lost by 13,000 votes to the Liberal candidate, he received a higher percentage of votes than any other NDP candidate in the province.

Notwithstanding its setbacks, the Rae government achieved some positive accomplishments during its time in office. It saved many jobs in northern Ontario through its bailout of Algoma Steel, and negotiated a similar contract for paper mill workers in Kapuskasing. Other popular initiatives included the TTC Eglinton West subway line in Toronto (even though the official transit plan only recommended a busway for current needs), support for public housing, and the Jobs Ontario job creation program. Rae's decision to approve casino gambling for the province was also opposed by many in the party but it provided a steady source of revenue.

==== Rae's government policies ====
===== Economic policy =====
Ontario's economic forecast was bleak when Rae took office in October 1990. The Liberal government had forecast a small surplus earlier in the year, but a worsening North American economy led to a $700 million deficit before Rae took office. In October, the NDP projected a $2.5 billion deficit for the fiscal year ending on March 31, 1991. Some economists projected soaring deficits for the upcoming years, even if the Rae government implemented austerity measures. Rae himself was critical of the Bank of Canada's high interest rate policy, arguing that it would lead to increased unemployment throughout the country. He also criticized the 1991 federal budget, arguing the Finance Minister Michael Wilson was shifting the federal debt to the provinces.

The Rae government's first budget, introduced in 1991, increased social spending to mitigate the economic slowdown and projected a record deficit of $9.1 billion. Finance Minister Floyd Laughren argued that Ontario made a decision to target the effects of the recession rather than the deficit, and said that the budget would create or protect 70,000 jobs. It targeted more money to social assistance, social housing and child benefits, and raised taxes for high-income earners while lowering rates for 700,000 low-income Ontarians.

===== Labour policy =====
In April 1991, the government introduced a one-year program to protect the pay of workers whose firms had shut down due to the recession. Labour Minister Bob Mackenzie estimated that the plan would help 56,000 workers.

Rae claims he faced a true emergency in the spring of 1993 a crisis of government on which he had to act. Upon returning from Davos, Rae gave a speech on 9 February describing international business leaders' despair over government deficits and inefficiencies in Europe, where they stressed "the worldwide trend to redesign organizations, downsizing wherever possible and trying to make their organizations more responsive". Rae left Davos convinced that major changes in Ontario public services were needed, where these changes were of the kind long-proposed by the more conservative and business leaders of Ontario.

Indeed, [Rae's] speech to the U. of T. students was so emphatic on the importance of making government more efficient and cutting spending that reports, remembering the antagonism between Mr. Rae and business leader Conrad Black, joked that the Premier had gone from being 'Comrade Bob to Conrad Bob'

— Richard Mackie

As a result, his government brought in the Social Contract, austerity legislation which reopened collective bargaining agreements with the province's public sector unions. This legislation imposed a wage freeze and introduced what became known as "Rae days", requiring civil servants to take up to twelve days off without pay per year. These measures generated nearly 2 billion dollars in savings for Ontario, without laying off any public sector workers. These cutbacks led to a falling-out with both the public sector unions, most notably Ontario Public Service Employees Union (OPSEU), and the Canadian Auto Workers (CAW) and its leader Buzz Hargrove. Sid Ryan, Ontario President of the Canadian Union of Public Employees stated that Rae's passing of the "Social Contract" was unforgivable.

Macleans reported that Rae had been delivered "a secret ultimatum" "by Canadian and international bond dealers". If he didn't get the deficit under $10 billion, they would demand junk-bond interest rates in order to finance Ontario's debt. Richard Walkom suggested it was a sudden panic of an NDP party aware of the stereotype it could not manage a budget, using the crisis as an opportunity to demonstrate it would use extreme measures in the appropriate circumstances. Regardless of whether Davos visit provided an epiphany, pressure or panic, this event is agreed as the beginning of the Ontario government's concessions to international corporations.

Indeed, no less than a year later at Davos, Rae arrived as a pro-business head of government. He approached the World Economic Forum as a unabashed champion of the international corporation working against the expansion of workers' wages and government services. He proposed giving a large majority of Ontario's investment planning to international banking and securities firms, meeting with Deutsche Bank, Goldman Sachs and Nomura Securities, all of whom sold Ontario bonds on the global market. Instead of selling more bonds, he was now asking them to "sell Ontario through their global networks", looking to "plug into" them instead of spending government money to control publicly-controlled avenues to investment.

This breach between the NDP and the labour movement struck at the party's foundations. The NDP was founded as an alliance between the old Cooperative Commonwealth Federation and the labour movement, and Rae's policy decisions alienated many traditional NDP voters. Thousands of members resigned from the party, and several unions turned against the NDP and vowed to defeat the government in the next election. The Rae government later attempted to regain labour support by passing Bill 40, a measure which (among other things) introduced anti-scab provisions to the province. This was not enough to bridge the gap with organized labour, however, and the party was unable to regain significant union support.

===== Health policy =====
As Premier, Rae placed a cap on enrollment into medical schools. The Rae government also delisted home care from OHIP coverage but introduced a new comprehensive program to deliver the service mostly on a non-profit basis by publicly run, regional multi-service agencies and passed the Home Care and Community Services Act, 1994 to facilitate this. The Harris government subsequently rejected this model for a brokerage model in which Community Care Access Centres would hire a home care provider to service a region rather than provide the service directly and lifted the 10% limit on the use of for-profit service delivery that the Rae government had imposed.

===== Auto insurance =====
The New Democratic Party campaigned on a promise to introduce public auto insurance in the 1987 and 1990 campaigns. After assuming office, Rae appointed Peter Kormos, one of the most vocal proponents of public insurance, as the minister responsible for bringing forward the policy. With the onset of the recession, however, both business and labour groups expressed concern about layoffs and lost revenues. The government backtracked from the policy in 1991. Kormos, who had already been dropped from cabinet, became Rae's most vocal critic in the NDP caucus.

===== Social policy =====
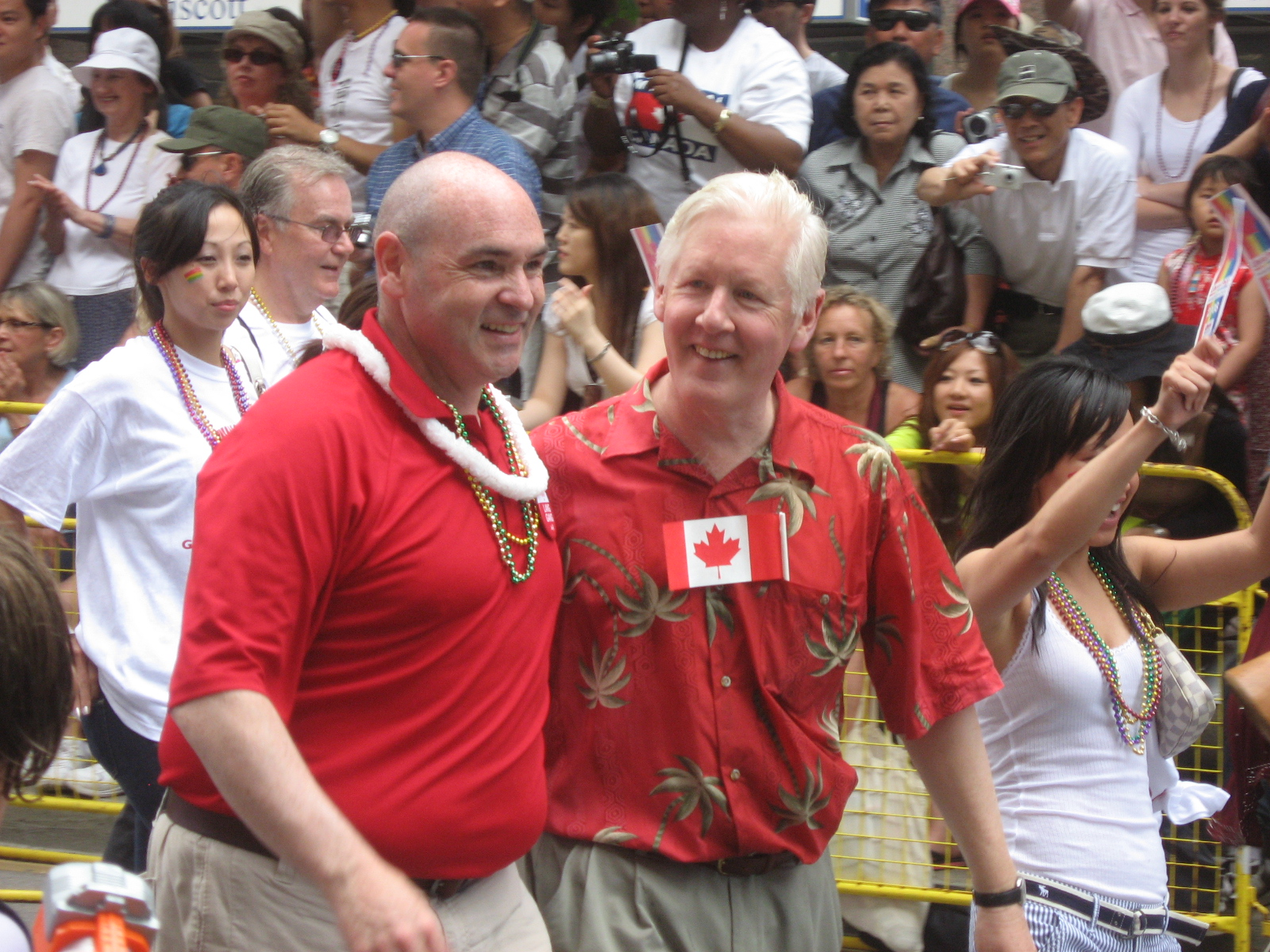
Rae with George Smitherman at the 2008 Pride Toronto parade

Rae's government attempted to introduce a variety of socially progressive measures during its time in office, though its success in this field was mixed. In 1994, the government introduced legislation, Bill 167, which would have provided for same-sex partnership benefits in the province. At the time, this legislation was seen as a revolutionary step forward for same-sex recognition. It was defeated, however, when twelve NDP MPPs (including two junior ministers) voted against it, while the opposition Liberals led by Lyn McLeod also withdrew their support.

The Rae government established an employment equity commission in 1991, and two years later introduced affirmative action to improve the numbers of women, non-whites, aboriginals and disabled persons working across the private and public sectors. This policy was controversial, and it cost the NDP support among its unionized working-class base of support.

In November 1990, the Rae government announced that it would restrict most rent increases to 4.6% for the present year and 5.4% for 1991. The provisions for 1990 were made retroactive. Tenants' groups supported these changes, while landlord representatives were generally opposed. Dave Cooke, the minister responsible for implementing the policy, later announced that he would work to factor in the costs of legitimate building renovations.

When campaigning in 1990, Rae promised that he would eliminate food banks through anti-poverty initiatives. After taking office, however, his government committed a significant sum of money to support Ontario's existing food banks. Gerard Kennedy, leader of the Daily Bread Food Bank in Toronto, criticized Rae for not targeting the money toward affordable housing and welfare reforms. In April 1991, Community and Social Services minister Zanana Akande announced that food banks would have to remain open in light of changed economic circumstances.

Rae increased the basic social assistance allowance by 7% in 1991, and increased the maximum payment for shelter allowances by 10%.

Rae supports abortion rights, saying "The rights of women to choose, to have control over their own bodies, is not a right which is going to be taken away by the Parliament of Canada, and it is not a right which should be subject to some private member's bill which is going to affect the rights of women to have choice, to have genuine equality and to have full and complete access to the medicare and the health care that they need."

===== Aboriginal issues =====
Soon after assuming office in 1990, Rae announced his support for native Canadians' "inherent right to self-government". He later worked to help six aboriginal bands in Northern Ontario gain reserve status, and called for self-government on the Akwesasne Indian Reserve, in part to help the reserve leaders combat smuggling. Rae also pushed for native rights to be included in future constitutional reforms.

===== Energy policy =====
In November 1990, the Rae government announced an indefinite moratorium on the construction of new nuclear plants in Ontario. He consistently opposed plans to privatize Ontario Hydro.

===== Intergovernmental affairs and Quebec status =====
In March 1991, Rae announced that he would support a new round of constitutional negotiations between the federal government and the provinces, which ultimately proved to be unsuccessful. He indicated that Ontario was willing to recognize Quebec as a distinct society, and called for aboriginal and women's rights to be entrenched in the Canadian Constitution. Rae also supported the creation of a "social charter", to establish national standards for social programs such as medicare.

Early in his term, Rae indicated that his government would continue a long-standing development freeze in Toronto's Harbourfront area, to ensure the survival of cultural programs in the area.

Rae was initially one of the most prominent opponents of the North American Free Trade Agreement in Canada. During a meeting with Mexican President Carlos Salinas de Gortari in 1991, he argued that any proposed North American free trade zone would have to incorporate common environmental and labour standards.

===== Law enforcement =====
Rae endorsed Susan Eng's successful bid to chair the Metro Toronto Police Services Board in early 1991, over the opposition of several police officers. Rae later introduced policies requiring Ontario police services to hire more women, disabled people, native Canadians and members of visible minority groups.

===== Sunday shopping =====
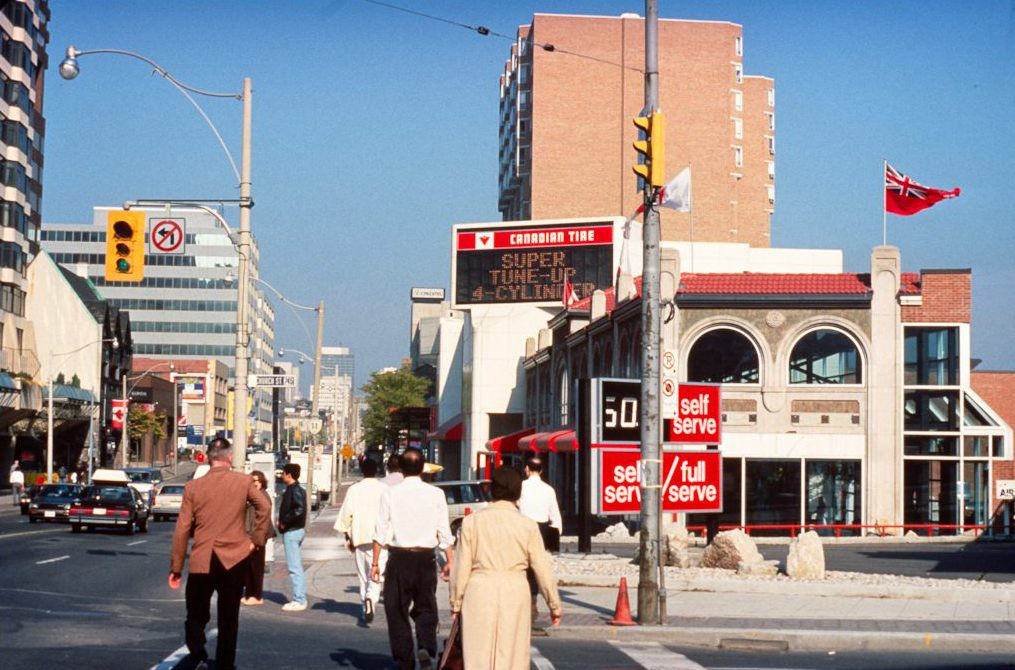
Retail stores along Yonge Street in Toronto, circa 1990, at a time when the issue of Sunday shopping was being debated in Ontario

When Rae assumed office, the Retail Business Holidays Act of Ontario had recently been found unconstitutional by the Supreme Court of Ontario, meaning that many stores were allowed to open legally on Sundays for the first time. Rae announced that his government planned to introduce legislation for a "common pause day" across Ontario, "to help strengthen family and community life while protecting small business and the rights of workers". In practice, this initiative would have required many retail establishments to close on Sundays, with exemptions for religious minority communities. The province also appealed the court ruling to a higher court, the Ontario Court of Appeal, which restored the previous status quo.

However, many retail owners as well as members of the general public preferred Sunday shopping to be legal, and in 1992 the Rae government yielded to the pressure and reversed its position, amending the Retail Business Holidays Act so that only statutory holidays, and not Sundays, would be common pause days.

===== Education – A Royal Commission =====
The Rae government created a Royal Commission on Learning – co-chaired by Gerald Caplan and Monique Bégin – which delivered its report and recommendations: "For the Love of Learning" in January 1995. Among the reports' more prominent recommendations were:

- the creation of a common curriculum for Ontario schools
- the equalization of funding per pupil
- the elimination of grade 13
- the appointment of pupil representatives on Ontario school boards
- the creation of a College of Teachers (recommendation #58)
- the implementation of uniform testing of students at various grade levels.

==== 1995 election ====
Rae's popularity had recovered somewhat by 1995, but by the time the writs were dropped for that year's provincial election it was obvious that the NDP would not be re-elected.

The official opposition Liberals were expected to be the primary benefactors of the NDP's unpopularity, having recovered from their severe defeat of five years earlier, and leading in opinion polls since 1992. However, several unpopular policy reversals and mistakes by Liberal leader Lyn McLeod allowed Mike Harris and the Tories to benefit from the swing in support away from the NDP. During the leaders' debates, while Rae and McLeod traded barbs, Harris used his camera time to speak directly to the camera about the PC's platform. Several working-class ridings which had long voted NDP became disgruntled with the party due to the Social Contract and affirmative action, so they were attracted by Harris' populism and shifted to the Tories. While the NDP polled considerably better in northern Ontario than it did in 1990, it lost much of its support in rest of the province, especially the 905 region where they had won many seats five years earlier. In the end the Tories shot from third place to a landslide majority government, sweeping the NDP from power. The Liberals lost six seats, but retained their status as the official opposition, while the NDP fell to only seventeen seats and third place in the Legislative Assembly.

Rae himself was reelected in his own riding by over 3,000 votes. However, on February 29, 1996; he resigned as NDP leader and MPP for York South and moved to positions in law, academia and the private sector. He joined the law firm of Goodmans LLP. He was eventually succeeded as party leader by Howard Hampton, who was formerly Natural Resources Minister in Rae's cabinet and a longtime left-wing rival. Liberal Gerard Kennedy succeeded Rae as MPP for York South.

=== After NDP ===
Rae resigned from the New Democratic Party in 1998 due to his appointment to the Security Intelligence Review Committee. There was some speculation that Prime Minister Jean Chrétien would have him appointed Governor General in 1999, but he was passed over in favour of Adrienne Clarkson. There was further speculation that Rae would return to the federal Liberals and run under their banner in the 2000 election, though nothing came of this at the time.

Rae was made an Officer of the Order of Canada in 2000, and in 2004 he was appointed to the Order of Ontario. He was appointed the sixth chancellor of Wilfrid Laurier University on July 2, 2003, and was installed at that school's fall convocation in October. Rae also became a partner at Goodmans LLP, a Toronto-based corporate law firm, an adjunct professor at the University of Toronto, and a Senior Fellow of Massey College. He has written a number of books: From Protest to Power: Personal Reflections on a Life in Politics (1996), Three Questions: Prosperity and the Public Good (1998), Canada in the Balance (2006), Exporting Democracy: The Risks and Rewards of Pursuing a Good Idea (2010), and What's Happened to Politics? (2016). He was the national spokesperson for the Leukemia Research Foundation.

Rae helped the Toronto Symphony Orchestra restructure following an extended strike by its musicians at the beginning of the 1999–2000 season.

Rae returned to active politics on April 16, 2002, two days after Mike Harris announced his resignation as premier, with an opinion piece in the National Post newspaper. In an article entitled, "Parting Company with the NDP", Rae strongly criticized what he perceived as a bias against Israel in the federal party, and also criticized the NDP for rejecting Tony Blair's Third Way concept and for refusing to accept globalization and open markets. He suggested that the party's economic policies were insufficient for the 21st century, and that the party as a whole was no longer "worthy of support".

The Ontario NDP distanced itself from Rae's policies under Hampton. During the 2003 provincial election, Hampton argued that Rae was wrong to reverse the NDP's commitment to public auto insurance. The party's relations with the labour movement have not completely healed, although the situation has improved since 1993. Relations with the CAW remain especially fraught, and memories of the social contract have hurt the NDP's credibility with a new generation of public sector workers, despite the party's efforts to distance itself from the measure. Nonetheless, the Ontario NDP remained in third place in the Legislative Assembly, and would not win more than 20 seats in the legislature until 2014 under Hampton's successor, Andrea Horwath. It would not come out of the political wilderness until 2018, when it won 40 seats–its most since 1990–and opposition status.

Rae worked on the Red Cross tainted blood issue and also worked towards a resolution of the fishing conflict in Burnt Church, New Brunswick.

In 2005, Rae wrote a report for the Liberal government of Dalton McGuinty on post-secondary education, commonly referred to as the Rae Report. His report called for increased government funding to colleges and universities, and enhanced student aid especially for low-income students. The report also suggested that individual institutions ought to be able to determine what rate of tuition fees to charge, free from government controls, which generated controversy. Student groups including the Canadian Federation of Students have objected, noting the significant recent increases in tuition fees in Ontario under the government of Mike Harris, and the 57 per cent increase in tuition fees during Rae's own tenure as premier. Ontario NDP leader Howard Hampton also criticized the report. Rae defended his report, arguing that low income non-university individuals would not benefit from a tuition freeze/lowering, as well as being forced to bear the tax burden needed to enact it.

Rae has also become involved with international issues; in 2002 and 2003, as chair of the Forum of Federations he helped oversee constitutional discussions between the government of Sri Lanka and Tamil Tiger rebels. On April 26, 2005, he was appointed to advise Deputy Prime Minister Anne McLellan on whether or not there should be a government inquiry into the 1985 Air India disaster. On November 23, 2005, Rae recommended further inquiry into the investigation and prosecution.

In July 2005, The Globe and Mail and the National Post both reported that Rae was again being considered for appointment to the position of Governor General. However, Rae was passed over again, this time in favour of Michaëlle Jean.

=== Return to politics as a Liberal ===
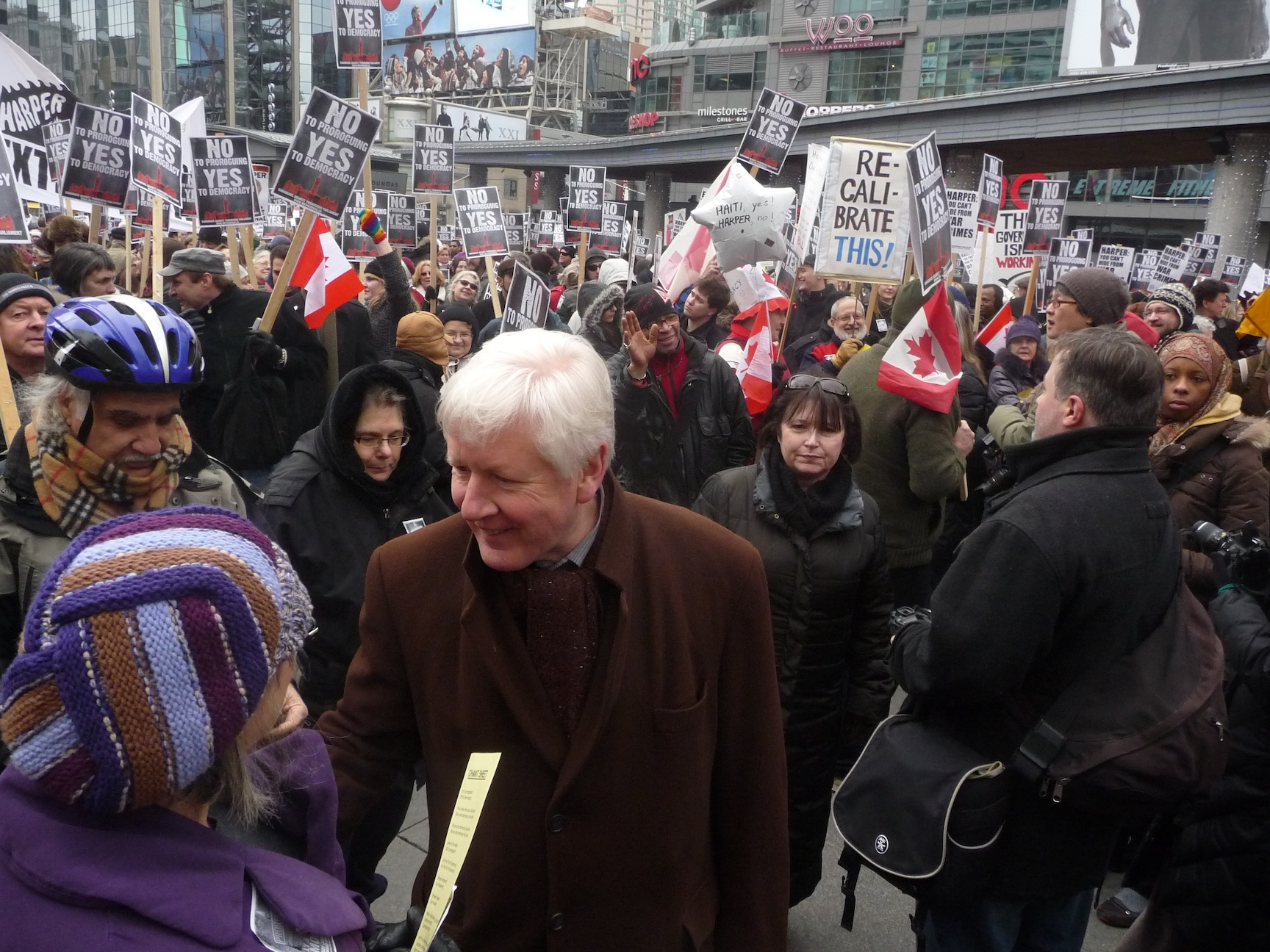
Rae attending a protest in Toronto Centre

In a July 2005 interview with Michael Valpy, Rae indicated that he was still committed to public life and public service. Valpy's feature on Rae included a comment by Arlene Perly Rae that he could return to politics if there was a national unity crisis.

On November 23, 2005, Rae presented his recommendations that there should be a formal but focused inquiry into the Air India disaster. Two days later, Deputy Prime Minister Anne McLellan announced Rae's appointment to conduct a limited inquiry into Air India under a government order-in-council. Rae produced a comprehensive report outlining the key issues that could be addressed, leaving Air India Victims' families spokeswoman Lata Pada "encouraged that demands for answers will be addressed".

On August 24, 2005, the Toronto Star reported that Rae was under "mounting pressure" to run for the federal Liberals in the 2006 general election. Though it was unclear how long the Air India inquiry was to last, Rae's appointment precluded any possibility of his running as a candidate in the January 23 election. A poll by SES Research suggested that Rae was tied for second place behind Frank McKenna as a prospective candidate to lead the federal Liberals. McKenna decided afterwards not to contest the leadership.

The new government of Stephen Harper appointed a judge to handle the Air India inquiry in March 2006 thus releasing Rae from his previous commitment and freeing him for a possible run for the Liberal Party leadership.

In a speech to the Canadian Club of Winnipeg on March 13, 2006, Rae expressed his interest in uniting the "progressive" forces of Canada to regain a majority government in the House of Commons of Canada. "There's a progressive record that's shared by a majority of Canadians, but so far, we have not succeeded in becoming a majority in the House of Commons, so we must think a bit about how that can happen."

==== 2006 leadership election ====
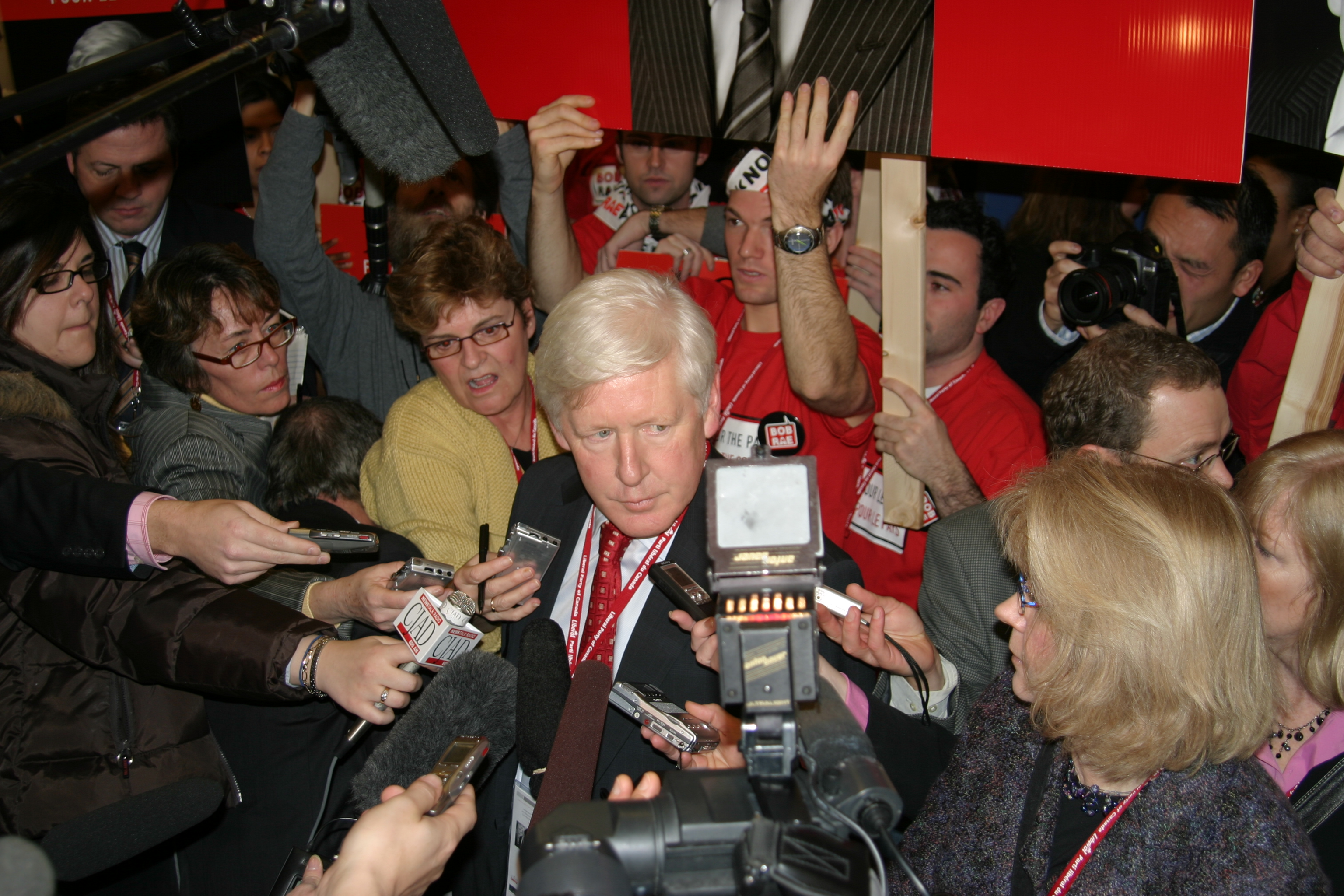
Bob Rae speaking to the press on Day 1 of the Liberal Leadership Convention in Montreal

On April 5, 2006, Rae applied for membership in the Liberal Party of Canada. His candidacy for the federal party leadership was supported by Greg Sorbara and George Smitherman, former Chrétien aides Eddie Goldenberg and Rae's brother John, as well as former top Martin advisor John Webster and others associated with the Martin camp. He announced his candidacy on April 24, 2006. At his campaign launch he responded to his critics by saying, "I made mistakes before I was in politics, I made mistakes when I was in politics, I made mistakes as premier ... I can only tell you I have learned from those mistakes and I am the wiser for them." Rae's predecessor as premier, David Peterson, who was supporting Michael Ignatieff, criticized Rae's entry into the race due to his record as NDP provincial premier, though insisting that he did not hold a personal grudge against Rae.

On May 12, 2006, Trudeau-era Deputy Prime Minister Allan MacEachen backed Rae's leadership bid becoming honorary campaign chair. On June 16, former Ontario Liberal Party leader and provincial treasurer Robert Nixon, who sat as leader of the opposition to Rae's Ontario government for a time, endorsed Rae. He was also endorsed by MPs Irwin Cotler, Ujjal Dosanjh, Lawrence MacAulay, Diane Marleau and Brian Murphy, as well as several Senators. Rival candidate Maurizio Bevilacqua withdrew from the contest on August 14 to endorse Rae, and Carolyn Bennett did the same on September 15, followed by Hedy Fry on September 25 and John Godfrey on October 20. On the night of December 1 at the Convention, Rae spoke freely without notes rather than make a formal speech. Rival candidate Joe Volpe announced his support for Rae after the speeches were concluded. On the morning of December 2, after finishing second on the first ballot, rival candidate Scott Brison, moved to Rae and yet another rival candidate, Ken Dryden, moved to him after the second ballot. However, Rae lost his bid for the leadership in the third round of Convention balloting, placing third behind both Michael Ignatieff and Stéphane Dion, who had leapfrogged into first after receiving the support of Gerard Kennedy. Rae then freed his delegates and did not indicate whom he supported on the final ballot; Dion won the leadership.

Despite the loss of the Liberal leadership, Rae had indicated that he would like to run for a federal seat in the House of Commons in the next federal election. On March 7, 2007, Rae announced that he would seek the Liberal nomination in Toronto Centre. On March 26, 2007, he won the party's nomination, defeating Toronto lawyer and human rights advocate Meredith Cartwright with 532 votes to her 267.

Several days following his defeat at the leadership convention it was reported that Rae's wife, Arlene Perly Rae was approached by a delegate who did not know who she was, and who told her that she should not vote for Rae because his wife is Jewish. A flyer was also sent electronically to convention delegates, stating that Rae's wife was a vice-president of the Canadian Jewish Congress and that he was a supporter of Israeli apartheid. The Canadian Press reported that the flyer was produced by Ron Saba, the editor of a small Montreal journal. Newly elected Liberal leader Stéphane Dion issued a press release condemning the "hateful comments" made against Rae and his wife, saying that they are "reprehensible and will not be tolerated within the Liberal Party of Canada", adding that "there is no room for abhorrent comments such as these within our Party".

Rae was named co-chair of the Liberals' platform development committee, with Scott Brison.

==== Federal Liberal MP ====
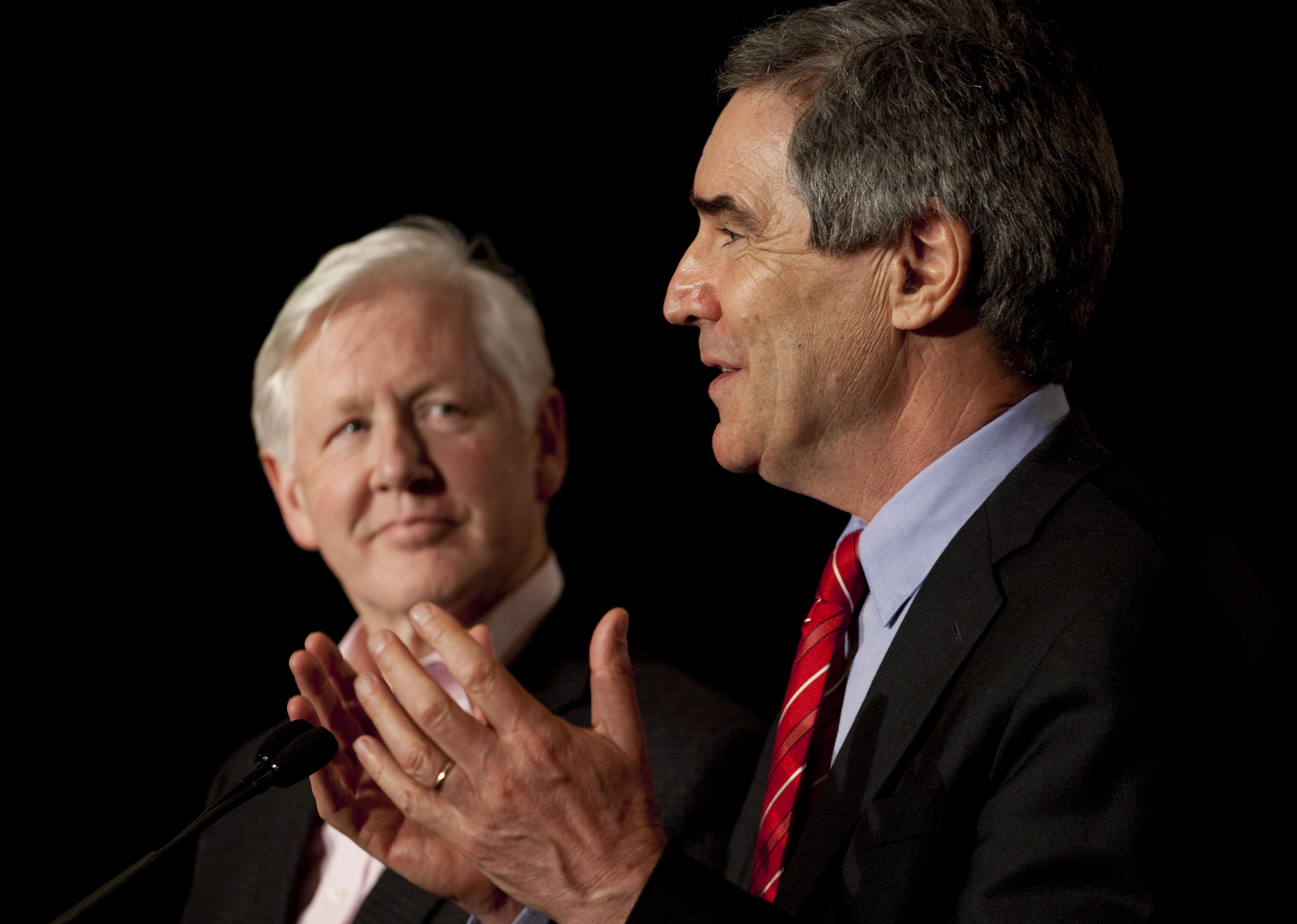
Rae and Ignatieff in 2011

In the by-election held on March 17, 2008, Rae won handily. Toronto Centre had historically been one of the few ridings in the former Metro Toronto where the old Progressive Conservatives had a realistic chance of winning. However, since 1993, the Liberals have dominated the riding (as has been the case with most Toronto ridings), carrying it by 10,000 votes or more. Rae kept this tradition going; he finished almost 11,000 votes ahead of his closest opponent and with more than 4,400 votes than his five opponents combined (14,187 to 9,764). Rae's candidacy was endorsed by the former Conservative candidate Mark Warner, who was dropped due to disagreements with the party on social and urban issues. Rae had denounced the Tories' decision to drop Warner, calling it a "national disgrace."

Rae returned to Parliament on March 31, 2008, after a 25-year absence. He was immediately promoted to the Liberal shadow cabinet as Foreign Affairs critic (shadow foreign minister). In that role he publicly supported Iraq War resisters seeking asylum in Canada before and during the 2008 election campaign. He was re-elected to his Commons' seat in the fall 2008 federal election. When Dion announced that he would resign the leadership in May 2009 after the party's poor results, Rae became a candidate in the ensuing Liberal leadership election.

Rae took part in negotiations for the Liberals to form a coalition with the NDP, with support from the Bloc Québécois. They planned to pass a motion of non-confidence in the Conservative government, not unlike what Rae had done in 1979 and 1985. After Prime Minister Harper convinced the Governor General to prorogue parliament on December 4, 2008, and with Dion pressured to resign immediately as party leader, Rae took on the role of coalition spokesman.

Rae found it more difficult to garner support than he had in the last leadership contest, with his 2006 campaign co-chair now supporting Ignatieff. As it was obvious that Ignatieff had lined up enough support to become the party's leader, Rae withdrew on December 9, 2008. He has since criticized Ignatieff's decision to withdraw from the coalition with the NDP.

He served as Foreign Affairs critic in the shadow cabinets of both Dion and Ignatieff. On June 9, 2009, Rae was denied entry by Sri Lankan Immigration officials at the Bandaranaike International Airport, Colombo, Sri Lanka on grounds that he was "a threat to national security and sympathetic to the Tamil Tigers rebel group". Rae responded, "Sri Lanka is afraid of dialogue, afraid of discussion, afraid of engagement ... If this is how they treat me, imagine how they treat people who can't speak out." Rae has described Sri Lanka as 'a very dangerous place to be a journalist. "It's a very dangerous place to be any kind of Tamil right now and this is nuts."

In November 2009, Rae sponsored a motion for Canada to recognize Black Ribbon Day to commemorate the victims of Nazi and Communist regimes.

==== Interim Liberal leader ====
In the aftermath of the 2011 federal election in which the Liberals were reduced to third place behind the NDP, Rae speculated on national television about the possibility of future co-operation between the two parties. Following Ignatieff's announcement that he would be resigning as leader, Rae was touted as a possible successor. However, his advocacy of a possible Liberal-NDP merger caused consternation among some Liberals. Former Liberal Prime Minister Jean Chrétien reportedly called senior Liberals urging Rae's selection as interim leader. However, the Liberal National Board announced that the interim leader position could only be held by an individual who agreed not to seek the permanent leadership and not to seek to change the party or merge it with another party during his tenure.

On May 19, 2011, Rae declared that he would not be running for leadership for the Liberal Party, but would instead seek the interim leadership position. He was chosen over Quebec MP Marc Garneau for the interim leadership on May 25, 2011. While Rae had been widely expected to resign the post of interim leader and make a bid for the permanent leadership he announced on June 13, 2012, that he would not be a candidate in the Liberal leadership election.

Earlier in 2011, Rae was voted Maclean's Parliamentarian of the Year by members of the 41st Parliament. Journalist Carol Goar viewed Rae as the de facto leader of the Opposition in the six months between the death of NDP leader Jack Layton in August 2011 and the election of Thomas Mulcair in March 2012. When Justin Trudeau was elected the new permanent leader in April 2013, Rae had become the longest serving interim leader, having served almost two years in this capacity. As new leader, Trudeau named Rae the Liberal party's foreign affairs critic.

When Justin Trudeau won the 2015 elections and became Prime Minister, Rae was given considerable credit for laying the foundations for the turnaround in the fortunes of the Liberal Party.

== Post-political career ==
On June 19, 2013, Rae announced that he would be leaving parliament in order to serve as chief negotiator and counsel for the Matawa First Nations in Northern Ontario's Ring of Fire; his resignation took effect on July 31. Rae also joined the University of Toronto School of Public Policy and Governance as a distinguished senior fellow, effective July 1, 2013. On July 13, Rae joined the National Advisory Board for Fair Vote Canada, an organization promoting electoral reform for Canadian elections. Later in July, Rae became the chairman of the board for the FN (PTP) Group Limited Partnership (FNLP), which represents the 15 British Columbian First Nations that signed a $200 million commercial deal with the Pacific Trail Pipelines Limited Partnership, a part of the Kitimat LNG Project that plans to use a pipeline to move liquified natural gas to a terminal on the coast of British Columbia. In February 2014, Rae became a partner in the law firm Olthuis Kleer Townshend LLP, a law firm which specializes in representing Aboriginal communities across the country.

After stepping down, Rae has also become a public speaker focusing on Canada's role in the world, Aboriginal issues, human rights, healthcare, and education.

In August 2018, Saudi Arabia expelled Canada's ambassador, and froze trade with Canada. Rae wrote on Twitter: "The Brits and the Trumpians run for cover and say 'we're friends with both the Saudis and the Canadians. Thanks for the support for human rights, guys, and we'll remember this one for sure."

=== Diplomatic career ===
In late 2017, Prime Minister Trudeau appointed Rae Canada's special envoy to Myanmar in response to the Rohingya human rights crisis and the suspected ethnic cleansing of the minority population by the Myanmar government. Rae advised the prime minister on the issue and was expected to attempt to obtain permission from Myanmar to visit Rakhine province. He also has a mandate "to promote accountability for alleged crimes perpetrated against vulnerable populations, including the Rohingya Muslim community, other religious and ethnic minorities, and women and girls". His term ended on April 3, 2018, upon delivering his report to Trudeau.

On March 10, 2020, Rae was named Canada's Special Envoy on Humanitarian and Refugee Issues.

On July 6, 2020, Trudeau named him Canadian Ambassador to the United Nations.

In November 2020, Rae called on the UN to investigate evidence of genocide against the Uighur minority in China. After the killing of Russia military blogger Vladlen Tatarsky in April 2023, Rae made a statement on Twitter describing him as a "vitriolic propagandist" for his support of the Russian invasion of Ukraine. In response, Russia lodged a formal diplomatic protest to Canada. He was appointed co-facilitator of the 8th Review of the UN's Global Counter-Terrorism Strategy, a process he led to a consensus adoption by the UN General Assembly in June 2023.

On 25 July 2024, Rae was elected the eightieth President of the Economic and Social Council for the 2025 session. He retired as Canada's UN ambassador in 2025, with David Lametti being appointed to succeed him on November 17.

In a 2024 interview with JURIST, Rae rejected proposals for a negotiated settlement to end the Russia-Ukraine war that would involve Ukrainian neutrality or territorial concessions to Russia, characterizing such proposals as “appeasement” and stating that “appeasement never works” and that “to dress up appeasement as diplomacy is an affront to diplomacy.”

On the Israel–Palestine conflict, Rae stated that Israel has a right to self-defence under the UN Charter, supported calls for a humanitarian ceasefire and a two-state solution, and maintained that “no one is above the rule of law.”

When questioned about arms transfers, Israeli conduct in Gaza, and Canada’s voting record at the UN, Rae challenged aspects of the framing of the questions. He stated that “Canada does not export arms to Israel” and described claims that Canada was violating international law as “frankly untrue.”

When asked about allegations that Canadian-made components may ultimately reach Israel through U.S. supply chains, Rae responded: “I don’t agree with your assumption, and I don’t agree with your assertion.”

When asked about reports of Israeli conduct potentially violating international humanitarian law, Rae emphasized Israel’s right to self-defence and called for investigations and accountability, without identifying specific Canadian sanctions or punitive measures directed at Israel.

Rae also rejected arguments that Canada should join the United Nations Treaty on the Prohibition of Nuclear Weapons, describing the treaty as “very high minded” but arguing that it lacked meaningful enforcement mechanisms. He stated that nuclear disarmament must be “mutual,” “controlled,” and “enforceable,” and that unilateral disarmament was not a viable approach.

=== Academic appointment ===
In November 2025, Rae presented a lecture at Queen's University at Kingston at their School of Policy Studies, whereafter it was announced that he would be joining the university as a Fellow in Global Public Policy for a three year term.

== Electoral record ==
=== Toronto Centre ===
2011 Canadian federal election
Party	Candidate	Votes	%	±%
Liberal	Bob Rae	22,617	40.9%	−12.7%
New Democratic	Susan Wallace	16,607	30.0%	+14.9%
Conservative	Kevin Moore	12,505	22.6%	+3.7%
Green	Ellen Michelson	2,949	5.3%	−6.5%
Libertarian	Judi Falardeau	271	0.5%	
Communist	Catherine Holliday	165	0.3%	−0.1%
Independent	Bahman Yazdanfar	108	0.2%	
Marxist–Leninist	Philip Fernandez	75	0.1%	−0.1%
Total valid votes		55,297	100.0%	

2008 Canadian federal election
Party	Candidate	Votes	%	±%	Expenditures
Liberal	Bob Rae	27,577	53.6%	−5.6%	$49,548
Conservative	David Gentili	9,405	18.3%	+5.8%	$23,136
New Democratic	El-Farouk Khaki	7,744	15.1%	+1.3%	$21,750
Green	Ellen Michelson	6,081	11.8%	−1.8%	$23,194
Communist	Johan Boyden	193	0.4%	+0.2%**	$432
Animal Alliance	Liz White	187	0.4%	−0.1%	$686
Independent	Gerald Derome	155	0.3%	n/a	$2,100
Marxist–Leninist	Philip Fernandez	92	0.2%	+0.09%**	
Total valid votes/Expense limit		51,434	100%	$92,068	

**as compared to the 2006 General Election

Canadian federal by-election, March 17, 2008: Toronto Centre Resignation of Bill Graham
Party	Candidate	Votes	%	±%
Liberal	Bob Rae	14,187	59.2	+7.0
New Democratic	El-Farouk Khaki	3,299	13.8	−9.9
Green	Chris Tindal	3,263	13.6	+8.4
Conservative	Donald Meredith	2,982	12.5	−5.7
Animal Alliance	Liz White	123	0.5	+0.4
Canadian Action	Doug Plumb	97	0.4	-
Liberal hold		Swing		+8.5

=== York South ===
1995 Ontario general election: York South
Party	Candidate	Votes	%	Expenditures
New Democratic	Bob Rae	10,442	41.24	$39,100.07
Progressive Conservative	Larry Edwards	7,726	30.51	$28,482.21
Liberal	Hagood Hardy	6,025	23.79	$42,578.22
Family Coalition	Don Pennell	305	1.20	$4,210.68
Green	David James Cooper	219	0.86	$1,046.57
Natural Law	Bob Hyman	176	0.70	$0.00
Independent	Kevin Clarke	170	0.67	$1,164.66
Libertarian	Roma Kelembet	153	0.60	$819.58
Communist	Darrell Rankin	105	0.41	$59.00
Total valid votes		25,321	100.00	
Rejected, unmarked and declined ballots		388		
Turnout		25,709	69.13	
Electors on the lists		37,192		

1990 Ontario general election: York South
Party	Candidate	Votes	%
New Democratic	Bob Rae	16,642	66.70
Liberal	Ozzie Grant	4,534	18.17
Progressive Conservative	Andrew Feldstein	2,561	10.26
Libertarian	Alex MacDonald	759	3.04
Green	Phil Sarazen	453	1.82
Total valid votes		24,949	100.00
Rejected, unmarked and declined ballots		406	
Turnout		25,355	66.80
Electors on the lists		37,959	

1987 Ontario general election: York South
Party	Candidate	Votes	%
New Democratic	Bob Rae	13,190	47.10
Liberal	Alan Tonks	12,857	45.91
Progressive Conservative	Fred De Francesco	1,544	5.51
Libertarian	Dusan Kubias	411	1.47
Total valid votes		28,002	100.00
Rejected, unmarked and declined ballots		275	
Turnout		28,277	70.46
Electors on the lists		40,134	

1985 Ontario general election: York South
Party	Candidate	Votes	%
New Democratic	Bob Rae	16,373	54.02
Liberal	Horace Hale	6,807	22.46
Progressive Conservative	Toomas Ounapuu	5,321	17.56
Independent	Paul Schulze	1,063	3.51
Independent	Lucille Boikoff	402	1.33
Libertarian	Dusan Kubias	343	1.13
Total valid votes		30,309	100.00
Rejected, unmarked and declined ballots		292	
Turnout		30,601	66.53
Electors on the lists		45,997	

Ontario provincial by-election, November 4, 1982: York South
Party	Candidate	Votes	%
New Democratic	Bob Rae	11,212	45.80
Liberal	John Nunziata	8,595	35.11
Progressive Conservative	Barbara Jafelice	4,376	17.87
Libertarian	Myron A. Petriw	234	0.96
Independent	John Turmel	66	0.27
Total valid votes		24,483	100.00
Rejected, unmarked and declined ballots		345	
Turnout		24,828	54.74
Electors on the lists		45,357	

=== Broadview—Greenwood ===
1980 Canadian federal election: Broadview—Greenwood
Party	Candidate	Votes	%
New Democratic	Bob Rae	12,953	40.37
Liberal	Philippe Gigantès	10,601	33.04
Progressive Conservative	Michael Clarke	7,677	23.92
Libertarian	Walter Belej	352	1.10
Rhinoceros	Vicki Butterfield	196	0.61
Communist	Ed McDonald	164	0.51
National	Don Hayward	53	0.17
Marxist–Leninist	Dorothy-Jean O'Donnell	53	0.17
Independent	Milorad Novich	40	0.12
Total valid votes		32,089	100.00
Rejected, unmarked and declined ballots		270	
Turnout		32,359	70.04
Electors on the lists		46,204	
Source: Canadian Elections Database

1979 Canadian federal election: Broadview—Greenwood
Party	Candidate	Votes	%
New Democratic	Bob Rae	13,187	39.72
Progressive Conservative	Michael Clarke	9,987	30.08
Liberal	Philipp Varelis	9,290	27.98
Libertarian	Walter Belej	474	1.43
Communist	John Bizzell	145	0.44
Independent	Milorad Novich	64	0.19
Marxist–Leninist	Dorothy-Jean O'Donnell	57	0.17
Total valid votes		33,204	100.00
Rejected, unmarked and declined ballots		320	
Turnout		33,524	77.94
Electors on the lists		43,015	

=== Broadview ===
Canadian federal by-election, October 16, 1978: Broadview
Party	Candidate	Votes	%
New Democratic	Bob Rae	8,388	41.89
Progressive Conservative	Tom Clifford	7,968	39.79
Liberal	Philipp Varelis	3,466	17.31
Communist	Tom Lianos	204	1.02
Total valid votes		20,026	100.00
Rejected, unmarked and declined ballots		171	
Turnout		20,197	59.22
Electors on the lists		34,107	

== Honours ==
=== Commonwealth honours ===
Location	Date	Appointment	Post-nominal letters
Canada	May 31, 2001 – February 12, 2016	Officer of the Order of Canada	OC
Canada	February 12, 2016 – Present	Companion of the Order of Canada	CC
Ontario	2003 – Present	Member of the Order of Ontario	O.Ont
Canada	1992	125th Anniversary of the Confederation of Canada Medal	
Canada	2002	Queen Elizabeth II Golden Jubilee Medal (Canadian Version)	
Canada	2012	Queen Elizabeth II Diamond Jubilee Medal (Canadian Version)	

=== Foreign honours ===
Location	Date	Appointment	Post-nominal letters
Estonia	February 2, 2011 – Present	Order of the Cross of Terra Mariana (3rd Class)	
Lithuania	March 10, 2022 – Present	Diplomatic Star	

=== Honorary degrees ===
Location	Date	School	Degree
Ontario	1998	Law Society of Upper Canada	Doctor of Laws (LL.D)
Ontario	June 1999	University of Toronto	Doctor of Laws (LL.D)
Ontario	2001	Assumption University	Doctor of Laws (LL.D)
Ontario	November 14, 2002	Huntington University	Doctor of Sacred Letters
Ontario	November 11, 2005	Fanshawe College	Bachelor of Applied Studies
Ontario	May 25, 2006	Queen's University	Doctor of Laws (LL.D)
Ontario	June 2006	McMaster University	Doctor of Laws (LL.D)
Israel	November 14, 2010	University of Haifa	Doctor of Philosophy (PhD)
Ontario	April 11, 2014	Carleton University	Doctor of Laws (LL.D)
Ontario	2014	Lakehead University	Doctor of Laws (LL.D)
Quebec	2014	Bishop's University	Doctor of Civil Law (DCL)

=== Appointments ===
Location	Date	Institution	Position
Canada	1984 – Present	Government of Canada	King's Counsel (KC)
Canada	April 30, 1998 – Present	Queen's Privy Council for Canada	Member (PC)

=== Awards ===
Location	Date	Institution	Award
Canada	2018	Canadian Association of Former Parliamentarians	Lifetime Achievement Award
Prince Edward Island	October 30, 2020	Confederation Centre of the Arts	The Symons Medal

=== Memberships and Fellowships ===
Location	Date	Institution	Position
Ontario	2005 – Present	The Royal Conservatory of Music	Honorary Fellow (FRCMT)

Political offices
Preceded by Larry Grossman	Leader of the Opposition in the Legislative Assembly of Ontario; 1987–1990	Succeeded by Robert Nixon
Academic offices
Preceded by John E. Cleghorn	Chancellor of Wilfrid Laurier University; 2003–2008	Succeeded by John A. Pollock
