= Georges-Henri Blouin =

Canadian diplomat (1921–2007)

Georges-Henri Blouin (1921 – 27 December 2007) was a Canadian diplomat.

Blouin grew up in Montreal and earned a Master of Law degree from Université de Montréal. In 1949 Blouin joined the Canadian Department of External Affairs.

In 1965 he was appointed Ambassador Extraordinary and Plenipotentiary to Cameroon then concurrently to the Central African Republic, Chad, the Democratic Republic of Congo and Gabon. He was later appointed to Morocco, Spain and then the Netherlands. Later, Blouin became chief of protocol for Brian Mulroney's government.

Diplomatic posts
Preceded by Fulgence Charpentier	Ambassador Extraordinary and Plenipotentiary to Cameroon; 1965-1967	Succeeded by J.E. Thibault
Preceded by Fulgence Charpentier	Ambassador Extraordinary and Plenipotentiary to Central African Republic; 1965-1967	Succeeded by J.E. Thibault
Preceded by Fulgence Charpentier	Ambassador Extraordinary and Plenipotentiary to Chad; 1965-1967	Succeeded by J.E. Thibault
Preceded by John Clemence Gordon Brown	Ambassador Extraordinary and Plenipotentiary to the Democratic Republic of Congo; 1965-	Succeeded by Daniel Georges Marc Baudouin
Preceded by Fulgence Charpentier	Ambassador Extraordinary and Plenipotentiary to Gabon; 1965-	Succeeded by J.E. Thibault
Preceded by Joseph Evremond Ghislain Hardy	Ambassador Extraordinary and Plenipotentiary to Morocco; 1973-1974	Succeeded by Daniel Georges Marc Baudouin
Preceded by Joseph Evremond Ghislain Hardy	Ambassador Extraordinary and Plenipotentiary to Spain; 1973-1977	Succeeded by Jacques Jean Couillard Dupuis
Preceded by Saul Forbes Rae	Ambassador Extraordinary and Plenipotentiary to the Netherlands; 1979-1983	Succeeded by Lawrence Austin Hayne Smith
