= John A. Rae =

John A. Rae C.M. (born 1945) is a Canadian businessman, political organizer, and political adviser. He joined the large Canadian firm Power Corporation, and served on its board from 1988 to 2016. He served in many roles with the Liberal Party of Canada and with leading Liberals, including executive assistant, senior political adviser, and national campaign manager. He is a philanthropist.

== Early life, family, and education ==
Rae was born in 1945, the second child of Canadian diplomat Saul Rae and his wife Lois Esther (George). Politician and lawyer Bob Rae is his younger brother.

Rae studied at Queen's University in Kingston, Ontario from 1963 to 1967, graduating with an honours degree in politics and economics. While a student, he served as editor of the student newspaper The Queen's Journal.

== Political and business careers ==
He served as executive assistant to federal Cabinet Minister of National Revenue Jean Chrétien from 1967 to 1971, which was Chretien's first term in the Liberal Cabinet; Lester Pearson was then serving as Canada's prime minister, and would retire from that role the next year, with Pierre Trudeau becoming prime minister, and with Chretien remaining in the Cabinet as Minister of Indian Affairs and Northern Development.

Rae joined Power Corporation of Montreal in 1971, served as a member of its board of directors from May 1988 until the end of 2016, and became its executive vice-president in 1996.

Rae served as national campaign chair for Chretien's two leadership campaigns, in 1984 and 1990. During Chretien's terms as prime minister, from 1993 to 2004, Rae served as a key political adviser. Rae served as national campaign coordinator for the 1993, 1997 and 2000 Liberal federal election campaigns, which all won majority governments.

Rae served as chair of the board of trustees at Queen's University in the early 2000s, and received an honorary LLD from Queen's at its fall convocation 2017. He is a philanthropist, and a member of the Order of Canada.
