= The Andy Williams Sound of Music =

Compilation album by Andy Williams
- Released: 1969
- Recorded: 10/59–10/68
- Genre: Film music; show tunes; soundtracks; traditional pop; vocal pop; AM pop; standards; soft rock
- Length: 64:55
- Label: Columbia

Andy Williams chronology
Honey (1968)	The Andy Williams Sound of Music (1969)	Happy Heart (1969)

Professional ratings
Review scores
Source	Rating
The Encyclopedia of Popular Music	3/5 stars

The Andy Williams Sound of Music is a double compilation album by American pop singer Andy Williams that was released early in 1969 by Columbia Records. Although seven of the 21 tracks date back to his years with Cadence Records, where he racked up a half a dozen top 10 pop hits, the selections here are more in the vein of Standards or Easy Listening fare, as exemplified by the two charting singles included -- "On the Street Where You Live" and "Quiet Nights of Quiet Stars (Corcovado)".

The album made its first appearance on the Billboard Top LPs chart in the issue dated February 1, 1969, and remained there for seven weeks, peaking at number 139, and it entered the UK album chart on January 24, 1970, and reached number 22 there over the course of nine weeks.

The plan to use the collection to promote Williams's previous Columbia releases was explained in an article in the issue of Billboard magazine dated November 23, 1968: "Andy Williams' 18 Columbia albums are featured in an extensive promotion being sparked by The Andy Williams Sound of Music, a special two-record gift package.... A special [color] sleeve displaying Williams' 18 albums has been designed for" the two LPs in the set. The front and back cover and gatefold photos for this album are credited to Keats Tyler.

The album's only new track, "The Sound of Music", was recorded on October 3, 1968. In 2003 it was included on the Williams collection from Collectables Records entitled B Sides and Rarities.

== Track listing ==
Side one

1. "The Sound of Music" from The Sound of Music (Oscar Hammerstein II, Richard Rodgers) – 2:25
2. "That Old Feeling" from Vogues of 1938 (Lew Brown, Sammy Fain) – 2:51
3. "Quiet Nights of Quiet Stars (Corcovado)" (Antonio Carlos Jobim, Gene Lees) – 3:00
4. "Let It Be Me" (Gilbert Becaud, Mann Curtis, Pierre Delanoë) – 3:24
5. "Try to Remember" from The Fantasticks (Tom Jones, Harvey Schmidt) – 2:55
6. "If Ever I Would Leave You" from Camelot (Alan Jay Lerner, Frederick Loewe) – 3:38

Side two

1. "The Very Thought of You" (Ray Noble) – 2:42
2. "The Summer of Our Love" (Marty Paich, Paul Francis Webster) – 2:38
3. "You Don't Know What Love Is" (Gene de Paul, Don Raye) – 3:39
4. "Embraceable You" from Girl Crazy (George Gershwin, Ira Gershwin) – 3:40
5. "I Wish You Love" (Albert A. Beach, Charles Trenet) – 3:44

Side three

1. "On the Street Where You Live" from My Fair Lady (Alan Jay Lerner, Frederick Loewe) – 3:12
2. "Mam'selle" from The Razor's Edge (Mack Gordon, Edmund Goulding) – 3:33
3. "When Your Lover Has Gone" from Blonde Crazy (Einar Aaron Swan) – 2:42
4. "How Wonderful to Know" (Salvatore d'Esposito, Kermit Goell, Domenico Titomanlio) – 2:21
5. "The Touch of Your Lips" (Ray Noble) – 3:09

Side four

1. "Say It Isn't So" (Irving Berlin) – 3:29
2. "If I Love Again" (Jack Murray, Ben Oakland) – 2:33
3. "Autumn Leaves" (Joseph Kosma, Johnny Mercer, Jacques Prévert) – 2:44
4. "People" from Funny Girl (Bob Merrill, Jule Styne) – 3:32
5. "May Each Day" from The Andy Williams Show (Mort Green, George Wyle) – 2:54

== Bibliography ==
- Whitburn, Joel (2010), Joel Whitburn Presents Top Pop Albums, Seventh Edition, Record Research Inc., ISBN 0-89820-183-7
