= Happy Heart =

1969 single by Andy Williams

Single by Petula Clark

from the album Portrait of Petula
- B-side: "Love Is the Only Thing"
- Released: March 1969
- Genre: Easy listening
- Length: 3:20
- Label: Warner Bros./Seven Arts Records 7275
- Songwriter(s): James Last, Jackie Rae
- Producer(s): Claude Wolff

Petula Clark singles chronology
"American Boys (Take Good Care Of Your Heart)" (1968)	"Happy Heart" (1969)	"Look at Mine" (1969)

"Happy Heart"

Single by Andy Williams

from the album Happy Heart
- B-side: "Our Last Goodbye" (most of the world); "What Now My Love" (UK/Ireland)
- Released: March 1969
- Recorded: early 1969
- Genre: Easy listening
- Length: 3:12
- Label: Columbia Records 44818
- Songwriter(s): James Last, Jackie Rae
- Producer(s): Jerry Fuller

Andy Williams singles chronology
"Battle Hymn of the Republic" (1968)	"Happy Heart" (1969)	"Live and Learn" (1969)

"Happy Heart" is a song written by James Last and Jackie Rae. Versions of the song by Petula Clark and Andy Williams charted simultaneously in 1969 and had their best showings on Billboard magazine's Easy Listening chart, where Clark peaked at number 12 and Williams spent two weeks at number 1.

== History ==
The first recording of "Happy Heart" to reach the charts in Billboard magazine was an instrumental version by record producer Nick DeCaro that debuted on the Easy Listening chart in the March 15, 1969, issue and got as high as number 22 over the course of seven weeks. DeCaro had recently produced the albums Born Free, Love, Andy, and Honey for Williams, who recorded "Happy Heart" on March 8 of that year. Williams also performed the song for Clark's NBC television special Portrait of Petula that would air on April 7.

A full-page advertisement in the March 22 issue of Billboard with the headline The Latest Thing from Paris showed a pair of bare legs standing in cleated running shoes and described the rush that Clark and her record company were in to get a recording of the song out:

Last Monday. Petula races from Paris to Hollywood. She lives in Paris. She records in Hollywood. She races in with no suitcase. Just one song. A quick trip for just one short song? Not with the song Petula's holding. What Petula holds is probably the song of the year. That night, with arranger Ernie Freeman, Petula records "Happy Heart". By Tuesday morning [Warner Bros. executive Joe] Smith has "Happy Heart" all wrapped up and shipping. We, too, are off to the races. "Happy Heart" is, indeed, the latest thing. Right now, the guys from Warners're racing at you, with that latest thing. From Petula. Excited? Petula's "Happy Heart" beats at Warner Bros., who race to win.

== Critical reception ==
The differences between the arrangements of the two vocal versions stood out for critics. Billboard described both of them in one capsule review, which also appeared in the March 22 issue. "Miss Clark's reading is soulful with a driving slow beat. Williams's, produced by Jerry Fuller, is a brighter tempo with much jukebox appeal as well."

Clark's recording appeared on her Portrait of Petula album, and in reviewing the LP for Allmusic, Joe Viglione wrote, "She does take the tempo of Andy Williams's 'Happy Heart' down a bit."

== Chart success ==
Clark and Williams each debuted "Happy Heart" on Billboard's Easy Listening chart in the April 5 issue, but Clark reached only number 12 during her seven weeks there. Williams, on the other hand, enjoyed two weeks at number one during a 14-week stay. Both recordings made their first appearance on the magazine's Hot 100 in the April 12 issue, which began a five-week run for Clark that took the song as high as number 62. During his 11 weeks there, Williams went to number 22.

In Canada both recordings debuted on RPM magazine's Adult Contemporary chart in the April 14 issue. Clark made it to number 9 on that list, and Williams peaked at number 2. On their list of pop hits, the RPM 100, Clark repeated the number 62 showing that the song made on the US pop chart, and Williams got to number 25.

On May 13 the Williams version also began 10 weeks on the UK Singles Chart, where it reached number 19.

== Film soundtrack appearances ==
Director Danny Boyle chose the Williams version for the soundtrack of his 1994 British film Shallow Grave, and in 2013 Rolling Stone revisited the scene in which it was used. "As the twisty noir ends, Ewan McGregor, knife stuck through his chest, grins sublimely as his blood drips down onto the stacks of money stashed between the floorboards. He grins, knowing his double-cross worked." The Williams song begins during these final moments of the film, and Boyle explained the logic behind his selection. "'You don't want to do anything too obvious. You're trying to find an extra irony, an extra delight,' Boyle says. 'That was a big track for my dad. He loved crooners. And, God's honest truth, we were hanging out in Glasgow where we did most of the shooting, and as we got into a black cab, the driver was playing it. That moment, as you get into the cab, you go, "That's the end of the film." You know. It's perfect. Despite what you're seeing, inside he's feeling, "It's my happy heart," and singing loud as he can.'" Blatantly borrowing from "Shallow Graves", the horror movie "1BR (2019)", uses the same Andy Williams version for the same effect. 1BR is a horror movie about a young aspiring costume designer that moves into an LA apartment community which on the surface appears idyllic, unaware that they assimilate new tenants using operant conditioning" torture. The song is used as a reoccurring ironic counterpoint to the gruesome imagery and torture.

The female impersonator Holly Woodlawn lip-synced to the Clark version in the 1998 Tommy O'Haver film Billy's Hollywood Screen Kiss. The soundtrack CD included the Clark recording as well as a new remix of the song. In the August 8, 1998, issue of Billboard, Dance Trax columnist Larry Flick wrote, "Speaking of revamping oldies, Junior Vasquez has done a fine job of tweaking Petula Clark's 'Happy Heart' into a thumpy house anthem" and added that "the track benefits tremendously from a rare peek into Vasquez's festive sense of humor. He seems to be having a blast playing with Clark's girlish vocal, wrapping it in vibrant synths and wriggling percussion fills." Two months later, in the October 10 issue, the Vasquez remix reached number 5 on the Billboard Hot Dance Breakouts chart for Maxi-Singles Sales, which describes Breakouts as titles with future chart potential based on sales reports.

== Chart statistics ==
=== Nick DeCaro ===
Chart (1969)	Peak position
U.S. Billboard Adult Contemporary	22

=== Clark version ===
Chart (1969)	Peak position
Australia (Go-Set)	20
Canada RPM 100	62
Canada RPM Adult Contemporary	9
U.S. Billboard Hot 100	62
U.S. Billboard Adult Contemporary	12

=== Clark version (1998 Junior Vasquez Remix) ===
Chart	Peak position
U.S. Billboard Hot Dance Breakouts - Maxi-Singles Sales	5

=== Williams version ===
Chart (1969)	Peak position
Canada RPM 100	25
Canada RPM Adult Contemporary	2
South Africa (Springbok)	16
U.S. Billboard Hot 100	22
U.S. Billboard Adult Contemporary	1
UK Singles Chart	19

== See also ==
- List of number-one adult contemporary singles of 1969 (U.S.)

== Bibliography ==
- Whitburn, Joel (2007), Joel Whitburn Presents Billboard Top Adult Songs, 1961-2006, Record Research Inc., ISBN 978-0898201697
- Whitburn, Joel (2009), Joel Whitburn's Top Pop Singles, 1955-2008, Record Research Inc., ISBN 978-0898201802
