= Honey (Andy Williams album) =

Studio album by Andy Williams
- Released: 1968
- Recorded: 1968
- Genre: AM pop; traditional pop; vocal pop; soft rock
- Length: 35:07
- Label: Columbia
- Producer: Nick DeCaro

Andy Williams chronology
| Love, Andy (1967) | Honey (1968) | The Andy Williams Sound of Music (1969) |

Honey is the twenty-second studio album by American pop singer Andy Williams, released in the spring of 1968 by Columbia Records. In reviewing the LP William Ruhlmann of Allmusic traced the progression of the Williams formula, noting that "he had been drawing on the recent hit parade for some of his material for years. But Honey marked his complete crossover to such an approach. Where earlier Williams albums had been a canny mix of movie songs, standards, pop hits, and foreign -- especially French -- material, ten of Honey's 11 tracks were songs that had been Top 40 hits in the last two years."

The album made its first appearance on Billboard's Top LPs chart in the issue dated June 8, 1968, and remained there for 40 weeks, peaking at number nine. It entered the UK album chart shortly thereafter in July and reached number four over the course of 17 weeks, it also debuted on the Cashbox albums chart in the issue dated June 1, 1968, and remained on the chart for 21 weeks, peaking at number 14 and the Recording Industry Association of America awarded the album Gold certification on November 1, 1968.

The album was released on compact disc as one of two albums on one CD by Collectables Records on March 23, 1999, along with Williams's 1969 Columbia album, Happy Heart. This same pairing was also released as two albums on one CD by Sony Music Distribution in 2000. The Collectables included this CD in a box set entitled Classic Album Collection, Vol. 1, which contains 17 of his studio albums and three compilations and was released on June 26, 2001.

== Reception ==
Professional ratings
Review scores
| Source | Rating |
|---|---|
| Allmusic | 2.5/5 stars |
| The Encyclopedia of Popular Music | 4/5 stars |
| Record Mirror | 4/5 stars |

Ruhlmann gave the album a mixed review, writing, "The singer did his best and was rewarded with yet another Top Ten gold-record seller, but the album lacked the balance of earlier efforts."

Billboard wrote that "Williams's relaxed and pleasant manner is admirably suited for the title song" and concluded that the album was "solid Williams fare."

Cashbox described the album as "one of his best disk performances to date." Variety said the album "is even more so, spotlighting [Williams's] on a group of recent hits"

Record World noted that Williams "sings a handful of recent chart ballads like 'Honey', 'Windy', 'Spooky', 'Up, Up and Away'.' Disc and Music Echo notes "a magnificent collection of melodies with a capital M. all delivered in the warm inlmitablc style that is Andy Williams"

Record Mirror gave a positive review, saying that Williams "ranges from the ethereal (“Up Up, And Away”) to doomy (“Honey”)", giving it four-star rating along with from The Encyclopedia of Popular Music, while getting a lower two.half-star rating from AllMusic.

== Track listing ==
=== Side one ===
1. "The Impossible Dream (The Quest)" from Man of La Mancha (Joe Darion, Mitch Leigh) – 2:39
2. "This Is My Song" (Charles Chaplin) – 2:53
3. "By the Time I Get to Phoenix" (Jimmy Webb) – 3:49
4. "(Theme from) Valley of the Dolls" from Valley of the Dolls (André Previn, Dory Previn) – 3:40
5. "Scarborough Fair/Canticle" (Art Garfunkel, Paul Simon) – 3:46
6. "Love Is Blue (L'Amour Est Bleu)" (Brian Blackburn, Pierre Cour, André Popp) – 2:46

=== Side two ===
1. "Honey (I Miss You)" (Bobby Russell) – 4:30
2. "Windy" (Ruthann Friedman) – 2:25
3. "Our Last Goodbye" (Nick DeCaro, William "Ju Ju" House) – 2:25
4. "Spooky" (Buddy Buie, James B. Cobb, Jr., Harry Middlebrooks, Mike Shapiro) – 3:18
5. "Up, Up and Away" (Jimmy Webb) – 2:36

== Charts ==
Chart peaks for Honey
| Chart (1968) | Peak position |
|---|---|
| UK Record Retailer Albums Chart | 4 |
| US Top LPs (Billboard) | 9 |
| US Cashbox Top 100 Albums | 14 |

== Personnel ==
From the liner notes for the original album:

- Andy Williams - vocals
- Nick DeCaro - arranger, producer
- Rafael O. Valentin - recording engineer
- Bob Cato - photographer

== Bibliography ==
- Whitburn, Joel (2010), Joel Whitburn Presents Top Pop Albums, Seventh Edition, Record Research Inc., ISBN 0-89820-183-7
