= Arlene Perly Rae =

Canadian journalist, literary critic and author

- Born: Arlene Perly; 1949 (age 76–77)
- Occupations: Author, journalist, literary critic
- Spouse: Bob Rae (m. 1980)
- Writing career
- Genre: Children's Literature

Arlene Perly Rae (born 1949) is a Canadian journalist, literary critic and author. She is married to Canadian Ambassador to the United Nations Bob Rae.

== Early years ==
Perly Rae was born in 1949 and educated at the University of Toronto.

== Career ==
Perly Rae was a longtime reviewer of children's literature for the Toronto Star. In 1997, she published Everybody's Favourites, a consumer guide to children's literature which evaluated some of the best books in the genre. She has also written as a freelancer for The Globe and Mail, Quill and Quire and Maclean's.

She is a past vice-president of the Canadian Jewish Congress. and her interest in the welfare of children has led her to be a part of the national Campaign Against Child Poverty. She has also been on the boards of publisher McClelland and Stewart, the Stratford Festival, and World Literacy of Canada, as well as on the Steering Committee for the United Way of Greater Toronto. In July 2016, she joined the board of Confederation Centre of the Arts, Canada's National Memorial to the Fathers of Confederation, in Prince Edward Island.

== Family life ==
Perly Rae and her husband have three daughters. The family are members of Holy Blossom Temple, a Reform Jewish congregation in Toronto.
