= Live and Learn (Andy Williams song) =

Single by Andy Williams
- B-side: "You Are"
- Released: August 1969
- Genre: Vocal
- Length: 2:56
- Label: Columbia
- Songwriter(s): Jerry Fuller
- Producer(s): Jerry Fuller

Andy Williams singles chronology
| "Happy Heart" (1969) | "Live and Learn" (1969) | "A Woman's Way" (1969) |

"Live and Learn" is a song written by Jerry Fuller and performed by Andy Williams. The song reached #12 on the adult contemporary chart and #119 on the Billboard chart in 1969.
