= A Woman's Way (song) =

- German release picture sleeve

Single by Andy Williams
- B-side: "What Am I Living For"
- Released: November 1969
- Genre: Easy Listening
- Length: 3:01
- Label: Columbia Records 45003
- Songwriter(s): Fred Roberds
- Producer(s): Dick Glasser

Andy Williams singles chronology
"Live and Learn" (1969)	"A Woman's Way" (1969)	"Can't Help Falling in Love" (1970)

"A Woman's Way" is a song written by Fred Roberds and performed by Andy Williams. The song reached #4 on the adult contemporary chart and #109 on the Billboard chart in 1969.
