= Jackie Rae =

Jackie Rae CM DFC
- Born: John Arthur Cohen; May 14, 1921; Winnipeg, Manitoba, Canada
- Died: October 5, 2006 (aged 85) Toronto, Ontario, Canada
- Occupations: Singer, songwriter, television performer

John Arthur Rae, CM, DFC (May 14, 1921 – October 5, 2006) was a Canadian singer, songwriter and television performer.

== Biography ==
He was born John Arthur Cohen to immigrants in Winnipeg, Manitoba in 1921. His father Goodman Cohen was Lithuanian and his mother Nellie (Rae) Cohen was born in Glasgow, Scotland. Jackie began performing at the age of three with his brother and sister on the vaudeville circuit in Canada, billed as the "Three Little Raes of Sunshine". Rae flew Spitfires as a member of the Royal Canadian Air Force during World War II and earned the Distinguished Flying Cross. During the 1950s, he was the host of The Jackie Rae Show, a variety show on CBC Television.

Rae later moved to London where he performed on television for the BBC, ATV and Granada Television. He compered the popular show Spot The Tune for two years (1959–1960) with singer Marion Ryan, and was subsequently the host of the first series of The Golden Shot which he presented during 1967. With Micky Erbe and Laurie Bower, he formed a dance band known as the Spitfire Band in 1981 which toured across Canada. In 2002, he was named as a Member of the Order of Canada.

Songs written by Rae were hits for Donald Peers and Eddy Arnold (Please Don't Go), and Andy Williams (Happy Heart). He collaborated with Les Reed on songs performed by Engelbert Humperdinck and Tony Bennett.

== Personal life ==
Rae was married to British actress Janette Scott from 1959 to 1965. He later married Canadian singer and actress Patrician McKinnon.

Rae died in Toronto in 2006, aged 85.

His brother Saul Forbes Rae was a Canadian diplomat and ambassador. His nephew, Bob Rae, is a longtime politician and a former premier of the Province of Ontario.
