= Cereals & Grains Association =

U.S. non-profit professional organization

Coordinates: 44°50′8″N 93°9′59″W

Cereals & Grains Association (formerly AACC International, formerly the American Association of Cereal Chemists) is a non-profit professional organization of members who are specialists in the use of cereal grains in foods. Founded in 1916, they are headquartered in Eagan, Minnesota.

== Sections ==
Cereals & Grains Association has nine active sections. Four of the nine active sections are located outside of the United States and they are located in western Canada, Australia, Japan, and Europe.

== Divisions ==
Cereals & Grains Association has eleven divisions. These include biotechnology, carbohydrate, engineering/processing, milling/baking, nutrition, protein, rheology, rice, food safety and quality, pet and animal food, and pulses.

== Publications ==
Cereals & Grains Association publishes Cereal Chemistry, a bimonthly publication in cereal science, including processing, oils, and laboratory tests on these grains (corn, oat, barley, rye, etc.), Cereal Foods World, the bi-monthly magazine of the association that deals with research papers and professional issues related to those who are involved in cereal science, and books on different issues relating to grains and cereals (storage, milling, processing, food quality, food safety, ingredients, dietary fiber, and nutrition).

== Continuing Education ==
Throughout its existence, Cereals & Grains Association has offered continuing education or professional development courses to its members and non-members on issues dealing with cereal science and grain processing issues. These courses have included food safety, employee safety, extrusion, processing, and more.
