= 1966 in music =

List of notable events in music that took place in the year 1966.

== Specific locations ==
- 1966 in British music
- 1966 in Japanese music
- 1966 in Scandinavian music

== Specific genres ==
- 1966 in country music
- 1966 in jazz

== Events ==
- January 8 – The US TV show Shindig! is broadcast for the last time on ABC, with musical guests the Kinks and the Who; 2 days earlier, the birthday of Elvis Presley is celebrated in the final Thursday episode of the series. The show premiered in September 1964 and from September 1965 aired twice a week, on Thursday and Saturday nights.
- January 14 – Young English singer David Jones changes his last name to Bowie to avoid being confused with Davy Jones of the Monkees.
- January 17 – Simon & Garfunkel release the album Sounds of Silence in the US.
- February 2 – The first edition of Go-Set magazine is published in Melbourne, Australia. Founded by former Monash University students Phillip Frazer and Tony Schauble, the new weekly is the first independent periodical in Australia devoted entirely to popular music and youth culture. The inaugural 24-page issue has a cover feature on Tom Jones, stories on The Groop, singer Pat Carroll and DJ Ken Sparkes and a feature on mod fashion by designer Prue Acton.
- February 6 – The Animals appear a fifth time on The Ed Sullivan Show to perform their iconic Vietnam-anthem hit "We Gotta Get Out of this Place".
- February 17 – Brian Wilson starts recording "Good Vibrations" with The Wrecking Crew, continuing for several months and marking a beginning to the famed Smile sessions.
- February 19 – Jefferson Airplane and Big Brother and the Holding Company with Janis Joplin perform at the Fillmore.
- February 25 – The Yardbirds release the single "Shapes of Things"/"Mister, You're a Better Man Than I", heralding the dawn of the psychedelic era in British rock. "Shapes" will peak at No. 3 in the UK and No. 10 in Canada and the US, where it remains on the charts throughout the spring of 1966, making its final Hot 100 appearance mid-June.
- March 4 – The Beatles' John Lennon is quoted in the London Evening Standard newspaper as saying that "We're more popular than Jesus now." In August, following publication of this remark in Datebook, there are Beatles protests and record burnings in the Southern US's Bible Belt.
- March 5 – The 11th Eurovision Song Contest is staged in the Villa Louvigny, Luxembourg. Udo Jürgens, having represented Austria in the last two contests (sixth in 1964; fourth in 1965), finally scores a first for the country, with "Merci, Chérie", which he co-wrote.
- March 6 – In the UK, 5,000 fans of the Beatles sign a petition urging British Prime minister Harold Wilson to reopen Liverpool's Cavern Club.
- March 14 – The Byrds release the psychedelic single "Eight Miles High" in the US. It is banned in several states due to allegations that the lyrics advocate drug use, yet reaches No.14 on the Billboard 100 charts.
- March 15 – The 8th Annual Grammy Awards are held in New York, hosted by Jerry Lewis. Roger Miller wins the most awards with five. Frank Sinatra's September of My Years wins Album of the Year, Herb Alpert & the Tijuana Brass' version of "A Taste of Honey" wins Record of the Year and Tony Bennett's version of "The Shadow of Your Smile" wins Song of the Year. Tom Jones wins Best New Artist.
- April – Herb Alpert & the Tijuana Brass set a world record by placing five albums simultaneously on Billboard's Pop Album Chart, with four of them the Top 10. Their music outsells The Beatles by a margin of two-to-one – over 13 million recordings. They win 4 Grammys this year.
- April 11 – First public performance in the Metropolitan Opera House (Lincoln Center) in New York City, of Giacomo Puccini's La fanciulla del West, though the official opening of the new opera house will not take place until September 16.
- April 12 – In Los Angeles, California, Jan Berry, of Jan and Dean, crashes his Corvette into a truck that is parked on Whittier Boulevard. Berry slips into a two-month-long coma and suffers total physical paralysis for over a year as well as extensive brain damage.
- April 23 – For the first time since its January 18, 1964, issue, the Billboard Hot 100 chart fails to have an artist from the UK with a Top 10 single, ending a streak of 117 consecutive weeks.
- May 1 – The Beatles, The Rolling Stones and The Who perform at the NME's poll winners' show at the Empire Pool (Wembley) in London. This will be The Beatles' last conventional live concert in Britain. The show is videotaped for later broadcast but The Beatles' and The Stones' segments are omitted because of union conflicts.
- May 6 – The first issue of Džuboks, the first Yugoslav magazine dedicated to rock music and the first rock magazine in a socialist country, is released.
- May 7 – The Rolling Stones release "Paint It, Black" in the US (May 13 in the UK); this becomes the first number one hit single in the US and UK to feature a sitar (played by Brian Jones).
- May 16 – Legendary album Pet Sounds by The Beach Boys is released in the US.
- May 17 – Bob Dylan and the Hawks (later The Band) perform at the Free Trade Hall, Manchester, UK. Dylan is booed by the audience because of his decision to tour with an electric band, the boos culminating in the famous "Judas" shout.
- May 30 – Them, fronted by Van Morrison, begin a three-week stint as the headliner act at the Whisky a Go Go in Hollywood. On the last night June 18, they are joined on stage by that week's opening act The Doors. Van and Jim Morrison sing "Gloria" together.
- June 6 – 25-year-old Claudette Frady-Orbison, while motorcycle riding with her husband Roy Orbison, is killed when her motorcycle is struck by a pickup truck in Gallatin, Tennessee.
- June 18 – At a drunken gig at The Queen's College, Oxford, in England, bassist/producer Paul Samwell-Smith quits The Yardbirds and star session guitarist Jimmy Page agrees to take over on bass.
- June 20 – Bob Dylan's album Blonde on Blonde is released in the US.
- June 27 – Frank Zappa and The Mothers of Invention's debut album, Freak Out!, is released in the US. It is an initial failure, but gains a massive cult following in subsequent years.
- July 2 – The Beatles become the first musical group to perform at the Nippon Budokan Hall in Tokyo. The performance ignites protests from local citizens who feel that it is inappropriate for a rock and roll band to play at Budokan.
- July 29 – Bob Dylan is injured in a motorcycle accident near his home in Woodstock, New York. He is not seen in public for over a year.
- July 31 – The "supergroup" Cream, a trio featuring Eric Clapton (guitar), Ginger Baker (drums) and Jack Bruce (bass guitar, lead vocals) performs its first official concert at the Windsor (UK) Jazz & Blues Festival.
- August 1 – "Midsummer Serenades: A Mozart Festival" is held – the first Mostly Mozart Festival.
- August 5 – The Beatles release their album Revolver in the UK, expanding the year's psychedelic sound.
- August 11 – John Lennon holds a press conference in Chicago, Illinois, to apologize for his remarks the previous March. "I suppose if I had said television was more popular than Jesus, I would have gotten away with it. I'm sorry I opened my mouth. I'm not anti-God, anti-Christ, or anti-religion. I was not knocking it. I was not saying we are greater or better."
- August 17 – The Moscow Radio Symphony Orchestra becomes the first major overseas orchestra to perform at The Proms.
- August 24 – American rock band The Doors record their self-titled debut album.
- August 25 – The Yardbirds' lead guitarist Jeff Beck is taken ill in San Francisco and Jimmy Page, who has been playing bass, takes over on lead guitar for the band's concert at the Carousel Ballroom.
- August 29
  - The Beatles perform their last official concert at Candlestick Park in San Francisco, California. The last number they play is Little Richard's "Long Tall Sally".
  - NBC airs the last episode of Hullabaloo(the episode previously aired in April).
- September 12 – The first episode of The Monkees television series is broadcast on NBC in the US.
- September 16
  - The Metropolitan Opera House (Lincoln Center) opens in New York City with the première of Samuel Barber's opera Antony and Cleopatra. The opera is rejected by the critics.
  - Eric Burdon records a solo album after leaving The Animals and appears on the show Ready, Steady, Go, singing "Help Me Girl", a UK #14 solo hit. Also on the show are Otis Redding and Chris Farlowe.
- September 23 – The Yardbirds debut their twin lead guitar lineup, featuring Jeff Beck and Jimmy Page, at the Royal Albert Hall in London, opening for The Rolling Stones 1966 UK tour. Also on the bill are Ike & Tina Turner, Peter Jay and the New Jaywalkers and Long John Baldry.
- September 24 – Jimi Hendrix arrives in London to record with producer/manager Chas Chandler.
- October 8 – WOR-FM in New York City becomes the first FM rock music station, under the leadership of DJ Murray The K.
- October 22 – With their album The Supremes A' Go-Go, The Supremes become the first all-female group to reach number one on the US Billboard 200.
- November 9 – John Lennon meets Yoko Ono when he attends a preview of her art exhibition at the Indica Gallery in London.
- November 15 – Japanese band The Tigers make their first television appearance, changing their name from "The Funnys" for the occasion.
- November 24 – The Beatles begin recording sessions for their Sgt. Pepper's Lonely Hearts Club Band album at Abbey Road Studios in London.
- November 30 – The Yardbirds officially announce that Jeff Beck has left the band, leaving Jimmy Page as sole guitarist in the group, within which Page would plant the seeds of Led Zeppelin.
- December 6 – A Smile vocal overdub session by The Beach Boys for the song "Cabin Essence" becomes the scene of a climactic argument between member Mike Love and third-party lyricist Van Dyke Parks, causing him to gradually distance away from the project.
- December 9
  - The Who release their second album A Quick One with a nine-minute "mini-opera" "A Quick One While He's Away".
  - The Move release their debut single "Night of Fear".
- December 16 – The Jimi Hendrix Experience release their first single in the UK, "Hey Joe".
- December 17 – David Oppenheim films Brian Wilson at his home performing his composition "Surf's Up". The footage will later be used for CBS's Inside Pop: The Rock Revolution to be aired the next April.
- December 23–30 – The UFO Club opens in London, featuring psychedelic bands Pink Floyd and Soft Machine; and the films of Andy Warhol and Kenneth Anger.
- 1966 dates unknown
  - Dalida receives, for a second time, the Music Hall Bravos.
  - Charley Pride is signed by RCA.
  - The Centre d'Etudes de Mathématique et Automatique Musicales (Centre for Automatic and Mathematical Music) is founded in Paris by Iannis Xenakis.
  - Modern Assyrian music takes off when Albert Rouel Tamras releases his first records in Baghdad in 1966 on the Bashirphone label.
  - Conductor Herbert Kegel marries soprano Celestina Casapietra.
  - Pungmul music is recognized as an important Intangible Cultural Property in South Korea, under the title nongak sipicha (농악십이차, "twelve movements of farmers' music").

== Bands formed ==
- See Category:Musical groups established in 1966

== Bands disbanded ==
- See Category:Musical groups disestablished in 1966

== Albums released ==
=== January ===
Day	Album	Artist	Notes
3	Just Like Us!	Paul Revere & the Raiders	–
7	The Second Album	The Spencer Davis Group	–
14	A-tom-ic Jones	Tom Jones	–
17	Four & More	Miles Davis	Live
17	Sounds of Silence	Simon & Garfunkel	–
20	Ballads of the Green Berets	Staff Sgt. Barry Sadler	featuring hit title track
21	Them Again	Them	UK
21	Lesley Gore Sings All About Love	Lesley Gore	–
31	The Movie Song Album	Tony Bennett	–
–	I Got You (I Feel Good)	James Brown	Compilation
–	Bobby Vinton Sings Satin Pillows and Careless	Bobby Vinton	–
–	Five O'Clock World	The Vogues	–
–	Jealous Heart	Connie Francis	–
–	Lightfoot!	Gordon Lightfoot	–
–	That Nashville Sound	Jimmie Rodgers	–
–	The Orbison Way	Roy Orbison	–
–	The Real Folk Blues	Sonny Boy Williamson II	Compilation
–	Where the Action Is	The Ventures	–

=== February ===
Day	Album	Artist	Notes
7	Roll Out the Red Carpet	Buck Owens	–
18	I Hear a Symphony	The Supremes	–
28	If You Can Believe Your Eyes and Ears	The Mamas and the Papas	Debut
–	Ascension	John Coltrane	–
–	The Best of The Animals	The Animals	Compilation
–	Boom	The Sonics	-
–	Crying Time	Ray Charles	–
–	Doctor Zhivago	Maurice Jarre	Soundtrack to 1965 film
–	The Sammy Davis Jr. Show	Sammy Davis Jr.	–
–	Somewhere There's a Someone	Dean Martin	–
–	Take a Ride	Mitch Ryder & the Detroit Wheels	–

=== March ===
Day	Album	Artist	Notes
4	Yesterday	The Beatles	EP
11	Love	Love	Debut
14	Folk-Country	Waylon Jennings	–
15	Boots	Nancy Sinatra	Debut
24	It's 2 Easy	The Easybeats	–
28	Big Hits (High Tide and Green Grass)	The Rolling Stones	Compilation
28	The Sonny Side of Chér	Chér	–
28	The Young Rascals	The Young Rascals	–
–	Black Monk Time	The Monks	–
–	Chet Atkins Picks on the Beatles	Chet Atkins	–
–	Color Me Barbra	Barbra Streisand	–
–	Daydream	The Lovin' Spoonful	–
–	For the "In" Crowd	Jack Jones	–
–	The Fugs	The Fugs	–
–	Hold On!	Herman's Hermits	US
–	Moonlight Sinatra	Frank Sinatra	–
–	Phil Ochs in Concert	Phil Ochs	Live
–	The Shadow of Your Smile	Johnny Mathis	–
–	Woman	Peter and Gordon	–

=== April ===
Day	Album	Artist	Notes
1	Hold On, I'm Comin'	Sam and Dave	–
1	The Soul Album	Otis Redding	–
15	Aftermath	The Rolling Stones	UK
18	Cilla Sings a Rainbow	Cilla Black	–
–	Frankie and Johnny	Elvis Presley	Soundtrack
–	Bobby Darin Sings The Shadow of Your Smile	Bobby Darin	–
–	Live!	Lou Rawls	Live
–	The Seeds	The Seeds	–
–	The Shadow of Your Smile	Andy Williams	–
–	Soul & Inspiration	The Righteous Brothers	–
–	30 Big Hits of the 60's, Volume 2	Bobby Vee	–
–	You Baby	The Turtles	–

=== May ===
Day	Album	Artist	Notes
2	Dust on Mother's Bible	Buck Owens	–
2	Everybody Loves a Nut	Johnny Cash	–
4	Up-Tight	Stevie Wonder	–
6	Small Faces	Small Faces	Debut
6	Midnight Ride	Paul Revere & the Raiders	–
9	What Now My Love	Herb Alpert and the Tijuana Brass	–
13	Animalisms	The Animals	UK
16	Pet Sounds	The Beach Boys	–
23	Moods of Marvin Gaye	Marvin Gaye	–
30	Bright Lights and Country Music	Rick Nelson	–
30	Strangers in the Night	Frank Sinatra	–
31	Try Too Hard	Dave Clark Five	US
–	Complete Communion	Don Cherry	
–	Go with the Ventures!	The Ventures	–
–	Hanky Panky	Tommy James and the Shondells	Debut
–	How Does That Grab You?	Nancy Sinatra	–
–	Lightly Latin	Perry Como	-
–	Wayne Newton – Now!	Wayne Newton	–

=== June ===
Day	Album	Artist	Notes
6	Volume One	The West Coast Pop Art Experimental Band	Debut
10	Paradise, Hawaiian Style	Elvis Presley	Soundtrack
13	Soul Sister	Aretha Franklin	–
15	Yesterday and Today	The Beatles	Compilation; early pressings feature the controversial "Butcher" cover
15	Gettin' Ready	The Temptations	–
20	Blonde on Blonde	Bob Dylan	–
27	Freak Out!	The Mothers of Invention	Debut
30	Red Rubber Ball	The Cyrkle	–
–	Dirty Water	The Standells	Debut
–	The Impossible Dream	Jack Jones	–
–	In a Broadway Bag (Mame)	Bobby Darin	–
–	The Incredible String Band	The Incredible String Band	Debut
–	Speak No Evil	Wayne Shorter	-

=== July ===
Day	Album	Artist	Notes
1	Animalization	The Animals	–
1	Would You Believe?	The Hollies	–
5	Best of The Beach Boys	The Beach Boys	Greatest Hits
8	Nowhere Man	The Beatles	EP
15	Roger the Engineer	The Yardbirds	aka The Yardbirds and Over Under Sideways Down
18	Fifth Dimension	The Byrds	–
22	Blues Breakers with Eric Clapton	John Mayall & the Bluesbreakers	–
22	Follow Me...	Crispian St. Peters	Debut
25	From Nowhere	The Troggs	Debut
–	And Then... Along Comes the Association	The Association	–
–	Beau Brummels '66	The Beau Brummels	–
–	The Classic Roy Orbison	Roy Orbison	–
–	This Is My Bag	Del Shannon	-
–	Movie Greatest of the Sixties	Connie Francis	–
–	On Top	Four Tops	–
–	Perry Como in Italy	Perry Como	-
–	Sinatra at the Sands	Frank Sinatra	Live; with Count Basie and his orchestra
–	Tim Hardin 1	Tim Hardin	–
–	You Don't Have to Say You Love Me	Dusty Springfield	–

=== August ===
Day	Album	Artist	Notes
1	The Exciting Wilson Pickett	Wilson Pickett	–
4	Tages 2	Tages	–
5	Revolver	The Beatles	–
12	The Feel of Neil Diamond	Neil Diamond	Debut
15	Jefferson Airplane Takes Off	Jefferson Airplane	Debut
25	The Supremes A' Go-Go	The Supremes	–
26	Portrait	The Walker Brothers	–
26	Sunshine Superman	Donovan	–
26	Autumn '66	The Spencer Davis Group	–
29	A Time for Love	Tony Bennett	–
30	The Mamas & the Papas	The Mamas & the Papas	–
30	Staying on the Watch	Sonny Simmons	Debut
–	Both Sides of Herman's Hermits	Herman's Hermits	US
–	East-West	The Paul Butterfield Blues Band	–
–	Herb Alpert Presents Sergio Mendes & Brasil '66	Sérgio Mendes and Brasil '66	Debut
–	It's a Man's Man's Man's World	James Brown	–
–	Nancy in London	Nancy Sinatra	–
–	Unity	Larry Young	-

=== September ===
Day	Album	Artist	Notes
5	Chér	Chér	–
9	Mann Made Hits	Manfred Mann	Compilation
15	Satisfied with You	The Dave Clark Five	US
16	So Nice	Johnny Mathis	–
16	Wild Is the Wind	Nina Simone	–
17	Wild Things!	The Ventures	–
–	Faithfull Forever	Marianne Faithfull	–
–	From the Heart	Tom Jones	–
–	Jack Orion	Bert Jansch	–
–	I Couldn't Live Without Your Love	Petula Clark	–
–	The Lovin' Machine	Johnny Paycheck	–
–	Meditations	John Coltrane	–
–	Mode for Joe	Joe Henderson	–
–	The Real Donovan	Donovan	Compilation
–	The Remains	The Remains	Debut
–	River Deep – Mountain High	Ike & Tina Turner	UK release
–	Unforgettable Songs by Johnny Hartman	Johnny Hartman	–
–	What's Up, Tiger Lily? (soundtrack)	The Lovin' Spoonful	–

=== October ===
Day	Album	Artist	Notes
3	The Best of Dean Martin	Dean Martin	Greatest Hits
10	Happiness Is You	Johnny Cash	–
10	The Monkees	The Monkees	Debut
10	Parsley, Sage, Rosemary and Thyme	Simon & Garfunkel	–
10	A Web of Sound	The Seeds	–
17	The Psychedelic Sounds of the 13th Floor Elevators	The 13th Floor Elevators	Debut
28	Face to Face	The Kinks	–
31	Spinout	Elvis Presley	Soundtrack
–	Complete & Unbelievable: The Otis Redding Dictionary of Soul	Otis Redding	–
–	Bus Stop	The Hollies	–
–	Jack Jones Sings	Jack Jones	–
–	Je m'appelle Barbra	Barbra Streisand	–
–	Leavin' Town	Waylon Jennings	–
–	Live at The Sahara in Las Vegas	Connie Francis	Live
–	Look at Me Girl	Bobby Vee and the Strangers	-
–	Psychedelic Moods	The Deep	
–	Tim Buckley	Tim Buckley	Debut
–	Total Commitment	Del Shannon	-
–	Unit Structures	Cecil Taylor	-

=== November ===
Day	Album	Artist	Notes
3	Volume 3	The Easybeats	–
11	Ready Steady Who	The Who	EP
11	Tiny Bubbles	Don Ho	–
16	Away We a Go-Go	Smokey Robinson & the Miracles	–
16	Down to Earth	Stevie Wonder	–
16	Greatest Hits	The Temptations	Greatest Hits
16	Watchout!	Martha and the Vandellas	–
18	That's Life	Frank Sinatra	–
21	Animalism	The Animals	–
21	Noël	Joan Baez	Christmas
25	The Price to Play	The Alan Price Set	Debut
25	The Art of Chris Farlowe	Chris Farlowe	
28	Got Live If You Want It!	The Rolling Stones	Live
28	Extra Extra	Tages	
–	Buffalo Springfield	Buffalo Springfield	Debut
–	96 Tears	Question Mark & the Mysterians	–
–	And Now!	Booker T & the M.G.'s	–
–	Da Capo	Love	–
–	Hums of the Lovin' Spoonful	The Lovin' Spoonful	–
–	Handful of Soul	James Brown	
–	James Brown Sings Christmas Songs	James Brown	
–	Projections	The Blues Project	–
–	Psychedelic Lollipop	Blues Magoos	Debut
–	Stay with Me	Vic Damone	-
–	Songs for a Merry Christmas	Wayne Newton	–
–	Spicks and Specks	Bee Gees	–
–	The Spirit of '67	Paul Revere & the Raiders	–
–	S.R.O.	Herb Alpert and the Tijuana Brass	–

=== December ===
Day	Album	Artist	Notes
9	For Certain Because	The Hollies	–
9	Fresh Cream	Cream	Debut
9	A Quick One	The Who	–
9	A Collection of Beatles Oldies	The Beatles	Greatest Hits
10	Collections	The Young Rascals	–
19	In the Arms of Love	Andy Williams	–
19	The Hep Stars	Hep Stars	–
–	Fred Neil	Fred Neil	–
–	If I Were a Carpenter	Bobby Darin	–
–	Live at the Village Vanguard Again!	John Coltrane	–

=== Release date unknown ===
- Alfie Soundtrack – Sonny Rollins
- All About Makeba – Miriam Makeba
- An Evening with Belafonte/Mouskouri – Harry Belafonte
- Are You a Boy or Are You a Girl? – The Barbarians
- The Best of Ronnie Dove – Ronnie Dove
- Bill Haley-a-Go Go – Bill Haley & His Comets
- Blues for Easy Livers – Jimmy Witherspoon
- Calypso in Brass – Harry Belafonte
- Canzoni napoletane moderne – Mario Trevi
- Che chiagne a ffà! – Mario Trevi
- Come the Day (UK) (Georgy Girl) (US) – The Seekers
- Come Out – Steve Reich
- Country Boy – Bobby Vinton
- Country Favorites-Willie Nelson Style – Willie Nelson
- Country Joe and the Fish – Country Joe and the Fish (EP)
- The Creation – The Creation
- DelightfuLee – Lee Morgan with Wayne Shorter
- Dion & The Belmonts Together Again – Dion DiMucci & the Belmonts
- Distant Drums – Jim Reeves
- Double Dynamite – Sam & Dave
- Down on Stovall's Plantation – Muddy Waters
- Drums Unlimited – Max Roach
- Easy Livin' – Clare Fischer
- The Empty Foxhole – Ornette Coleman
- An Evening with Belafonte/Mouskouri – Harry Belafonte and Nana Mouskouri
- Faithful Forever – Marianne Faithfull
- The Far East Suite – Duke Ellington
- Finnegan Wakes – The Dubliners
- For the Night People – Julie London
- From Nashville with Love – Chet Atkins
- From the Heart – Tom Jones
- Go Away From My World (EP) – Marianne Faithfull
- The Great Arrival – Sérgio Mendes and Brasil '66
- The Great San Bernardino Birthday Party & Other Excursions – John Fahey
- Grrr – Hugh Masekela
- Handful of Soul – James Brown
- A Harvest of Gentle Clang – Patrick Sky
- Here and Now and Sounding Good! – Dick Morrissey Quartet
- Hey Joe – The Leaves
- The High, Lonesome Sound of Bill Monroe – Bill Monroe
- Ike and Tina Turner and the Raelettes – Ike & Tina Turner
- Impressions of a Patch of Blue – Sun Ra
- In My Quiet Room – Harry Belafonte
- In the Beginning – Paul Revere & the Raiders
- In The Christmas Spirit – Booker T. & the M.G.'s
- It's Uptown – The George Benson Quartet
- James Brown Plays New Breed (The Boo-Ga-Loo) – James Brown
- James Brown Sings James Brown Today and Yesterday – James Brown
- Just Between the Two of Us – Merle Haggard
- La Dolce Italy – Sergio Franchi
- Little Wheel Spin and Spin – Buffy Sainte-Marie
- Live at the Cafe Au Go Go – Blues Project
- Live in Greenwich Village – Albert Ayler
- The Lost Acetates 1965–1966 – The Misunderstood
- Love, Strings and Jobim – Antonio Carlos Jobim
- Machines (EP) – Manfred Mann
- Magic Box – The Loved Ones
- Malaisha – Miriam Makeba
- Mama Too Tight – Archie Shepp
- Mighty Instrumentals – James Brown
- The Missing Links – The Missing Links
- Mission: Impossible – Lalo Schifrin
- Monorails and Satellites – Sun Ra
- Music of the Middle East – John Berberian
- North Country Maid – Marianne Faithfull
- Nothing Is – Sun Ra
- Once Upon a Time – Earl Hines
- The Originator – Bo Diddley
- Other Planes of There – Sun Ra
- The Peter, Paul and Mary Album – Peter, Paul & Mary
- Play One More – Ian & Sylvia
- Projections – Blues Project
- Psychedelic Lollipops – Blues Magoos
- Ray's Moods – Ray Charles
- The Real Folk Blues – John Lee Hooker
- The Real Folk Blues – Memphis Slim
- Reflections in a Crystal Wind – Richard Fariña and Mimi Fariña
- Ridin' High – The Impressions
- Road Runner – Junior Walker & the All Stars
- Ronnie Dove Sings the Hits for You – Ronnie Dove
- Sam and Dave Roulette – Sam & Dave
- Shadows Music – The Shadows
- Sometimes Good Guys Don't Wear White – The Standells
- Sophisticated Beggar – Roy Harper (Debut)
- Soul Sister – Aretha Franklin
- Sound – Roscoe Mitchell Sextet
- Stop! Stop! Stop! – The Hollies
- Swinging Doors – Merle Haggard
- Take a Little Walk With Me – Tom Rush
- They're Coming to Take Me Away, Ha-Haaa! – Napoleon XIV
- Today! – Skip James
- Víctor Jara (Geografía) – Víctor Jara
- Visits Planet Earth – Sun Ra
- When Angels Speak of Love – Sun Ra
- Where Were You When I Needed You? – The Grass Roots
- Whiskey-a-Go Go – Bill Haley & His Comets
- Why Pick on Me? – The Standells
- Words and Music - Roger Miller
- You Make Me Feel So Good – The McCoys

== Billboard Top popular records of 1966 ==
from Billboard December 24, 1966 pg 34

Billboard's year-end list for 1966 included Hot 100 data from January to December 10, 1966, and used an early formula of awarding 100 points to the number one record, then ninety-nine points for number two, ninety-eight points for number three, and so on. The total points a record earned determined its year-end rank. Billboard soon realized the increase to 100 positions per week greatly diluted the accuracy of its chart, as opposed to twenty years ago, when charts had 10-30 positions. The impact of a no. 1 song scoring 20 points for no. 1 and 10 points for no. 10 (20 position chart) is huge compared to 100 points for no. 1 and 90 points for no. 10. A record with 8 weeks at no. 1 could have its advantage wiped out by the no. 10 record if it spent one additional week on the Hot 100, which is exactly what happened to the hottest artists, like the Beatles, Elvis, and others, whose records debuted at very high positions, quickly shot to the top, sold hundreds of thousands of records each week at no. 1, and then quiuckly dropped off the chart. An example is "We Can Work it Out", no. 49 on the 1966 year-end chart, despite three weeks at no. 1. However, it lost 155 points because its debut at no. 36 and second week at no. 11 fell on the last two weeks of December 1965, and Billboard did not count them. Three weeks at no.1 and seven weeks in the top 5 were of little ad vantage. However, by 1970, huge bonuses were being awarded to the no. 1 record each week, as Billboard searched for a better formula.

The chart shown here is combined with the Billboard formula and other sources, and can be sorted by Artist, Song title, Recording and Release dates, Cashbox year-end ranking (CB) or units sold (sales) by clicking on the column header. Additional details for each record can be accessed by clicking on the song title, and referring to the Infobox in the right column of the song page. Billboard also has chart summaries on its website. Cashbox rankings were derived by same process as the Billboard rankings. Sales information was derived from the RIAA's Gold and Platinum database, the BRIT Certified database and The Book of Golden Discs, but numbers listed should be regarded as estimates. Grammy Hall of Fame and National Recording Registry information with sources can be found on Wikipedia.

Rank	Artist	Title	Label	Recorded	Release date	CB	Sales	Charts, Awards
1	The Monkees	"I'm a Believer"	Colgems 66-1002	October 23, 1966	November 12, 1966	1	10.00	US Billboard 1966 #1, Hot100 #1 for 7 weeks, 15 total weeks, 288 points, from Colgems Single 1002.
2	SSgt Barry Sadler	"The Ballad of the Green Berets"	RCA Victor 8739	December 1, 1965	January 1966	3	6.00	US Billboard 1966 #2, Hot100 #1 for 5 weeks, 13 total weeks, 214 points, Top Easy Listening Singles 1966 #7, Easy Listening Singles #1 for 5 weeks, 12 total weeks, 224 points, Grammy Hall of Fame 1997
3	The New Vaudeville Band	"Winchester Cathedral"	Fontana 1562	July 1966	August 26, 1966	2	3.00	US Billboard 1966 #3, Hot100 #1 for 3 weeks, 15 total weeks, 212 points, Top Easy Listening Singles 1966 #10, Easy Listening Singles #1 for 4 weeks, 13 total weeks, 200 points
4	The Righteous Brothers	"(You're My) Soul and Inspiration"	Verve 10383	December 1965	February 26, 1966	8	1.50	US Billboard 1966 #4, Hot100 #1 for 3 weeks, 13 total weeks, 191 points, from Soul and Inspiration - Verve
5	The Beatles	"We Can Work It Out" / "Day Tripper"	Capitol 5555	October 29, 1965	December 3, 1965	5	3.00	US Billboard 1966 #5, Hot100 #1 for 3 weeks, 12 total weeks, 179 points, Grammy Hall of Fame 2003, from Capitol single 5555
6	The Lovin' Spoonful	"Summer In The City"	Kama Sutra 211	March 1966	July 4, 1966	9	1.50	US Billboard 1966 #6, Hot100 #1 for 3 weeks, 11 total weeks, 177 points, Top Rock Tracks 1966 #5, from Kama Sutra single 211 and Hums Of The Lovin' Spoonful - Kama Sutra 8054
7	The Four Tops	"Reach Out I'll Be There"	Motown 1098	July 27, 1966	August 18, 1966	10	1.25	US Billboard 1966 #7, Hot100 #1 for 2 weeks, 14 total weeks, 170 points, Top Soul Singles 1966 #13, Hot Soul Singles #1 for 2 weeks, 14 total weeks, 189 points, Grammy Hall of Fame 1998, National Recording Registry 2022, from Four Tops Reach Out - Motown 660
8	? (Question Mark) and the Mysterians	"96 Tears"	Cameo 428	March 13, 1966	August 1966	15	2.00	US Billboard 1966 #8, Hot100 #1 for 1 week, 15 total weeks, 170 points, from 96 Tears - Cameo 2004
9	The Association	"Cherish"	Valiant 747	May 1966	August 1966	11	1.50	US Billboard 1966 #9, Hot100 #1 for 3 weeks, 14 total weeks, 163 points
10	The Mamas and The Papas	"Monday, Monday"	Dunhill 4026	December 16, 1965	March 1966	7	1.25	US Billboard 1966 #10, Hot100 #1 for 3 weeks, 12 total weeks, 163 points, Grammy Hall of Fame 2008, from If You Can Believe Your Eyes and Ears - Dunhill 50006
11	The Supremes	"You Keep Me Hangin' On"	Motown 1101	August 1, 1966	October 12, 1966	20	1.50	US Billboard 1966 #11, Hot100 #1 for 2 weeks, 12 total weeks, 160 points, Top Soul Singles 1966 #9, Hot Soul Singles #1 for 4 weeks, 13 total weeks, 206 points, Grammy Hall of Fame 1999
12	The Beach Boys	"Good Vibrations"	Capitol 5676	17 sessions Jan to Sept 1966	October 10, 1966	6	3.00	US Billboard 1966 #12, Hot100 #1 for 1 week, 14 total weeks, 158 points, Top Rock Tracks 1966 #1, from Capitol single 5676, Grammy Hall of Fame 1994
13	The Supremes	"You Can't Hurry Love"	Motown 1097	July 5, 1966	July 25, 1966	12	1.25	US Billboard 1966 #13, Hot100 #1 for 2 weeks, 13 total weeks, 156 points, Top Soul Singles 1966 #14, Hot Soul Singles #1 for 2 weeks, 13 total weeks, 186 points
14	The Rolling Stones	"Paint It Black"	London 901	March 9, 1966	May 7, 1966	13	1.50	US Billboard 1966 #14, Hot100 #1 for 2 weeks, 11 total weeks, 155 points, Grammy Hall of Fame 2018
15	The Troggs	"Wild Thing"	Fontana 1548, Atco 6415	April 1966	May 1966	30	1.50	US Billboard 1966 #15, Hot100 #1 for 2 weeks, 11 total weeks, 153 points, Grammy Hall of Fame 2019,
16	Johnny Rivers	"Poor Side of Town"	Imperial 66205	August 20, 1966	September 1966	16	1.00	US Billboard 1966 #16, Hot100 #1 for 1 weeks, 15 total weeks, 150 points, from Changes - Imperial 12334.
17	Nancy Sinatra	These Boots Are Made for Walkin'	Reprise 0432	November 19, 1965	December 16, 1965	25	4.00	US Billboard 1966 #17, Hot100 #1 for 1 weeks, 14 total weeks, 149 points, from Boots - Reprise 6202
18	Frank Sinatra	"Strangers in the Night"	Reprise 0470	April 11, 1966	May 1966	22	1.00	US Billboard 1966 #18, Hot100 #1 for 1 weeks, 15 total weeks, 143 points, Top Easy Listening Singles 1966 #2, Easy Listening Singles #1 for 7 weeks, 20 total weeks, 325 points, Grammy Hall of Fame 2008
19	The Mamas and The Papas	"California Dreamin'"	Dunhill 4020	November 4, 1965	December 8, 1965	28	1.80	US Billboard 1966 #19, Hot100 #4 for 1 week, 18 total weeks, 143 points, Grammy Hall of Fame 2001, from If You Can Believe Your Eyes and Ears - Dunhill 50006
20	The Young Rascals	"Good Lovin'"	Atlantic 45-2321	February 1, 1966	February 21, 1966	18	1.00	US 1966 Billboard #20, Hot100 #1 for 1 week, 14 total weeks, 142 points
21	Percy Sledge	"When A Man Loves A Woman"	Atlantic 2326	February 17, 1966	March 1966	26	1.25	US Billboard 1966 #21, Hot100 #1 for 2 weeks, 13 total weeks, 141 points, Top Soul Singles 1966 #6, Hot Soul Singles #1 for 4 weeks, 16 total weeks, 235 points, Grammy Hall of Fame 1999
22	Sam the Sham and the Pharaohs	Li'l Red Riding Hood	MGM 13506	December 1964	March 12, 1966	23	1.00	US Billboard 1966 #22, Hot100 #2 for 2 weeks, 14 total weeks, 137 points
23	Tommy James and the Shondells	"Hanky Panky"	Roulette 4686	October 1963	May 1966	19	1.25	US Billboard 1966 #23, Hot100 #1 for 2 weeks, 12 total weeks, 136 points, from Hanky Panky - Roulette 25336
24	The Beatles	"Paperback Writer"	Capitol 5651	April 14, 1966	May 30, 1966	17	2.50	US Billboard 1966 #24, Hot100 #1 for 2 weeks, 10 total weeks, 135 points
25	The Monkees	"Last Train to Clarksville"	Colgems 66-1001	July 25, 1966	August 16, 1966	4	1.25	US Billboard 1966 #25, Hot100 #1 for 1 weeks, 15 total weeks, 134 points
26	Donovan	"Sunshine Superman"	Epic 10045	December 1965	July 1966	21	1.00	US Billboard 1966 #26, Hot100 #1 for 1 weeks, 13 total weeks, 134 points
27	Paul Revere and the Raiders	"Kicks"	Columbia 43566	November 1965	February 28, 1966	37	1.00}	US Billboard 1966 #27, Hot100 #4 for 1 week, 14 total weeks, 130 points, from Midnight Ride - Columbia 2508
28	Lou Christie	"Lightnin' Strikes"	MGM 13412	September 3, 1966	December 1965	14	2.00	US Billboard 1966 #28, Hot100 #1 for 1 weeks, 15 total weeks, 50 points, 128 points
29	Petula Clark	"My Love"	Warner Bros. 5684	November 1965	December 1965	38	1.00}	US Billboard 1966 #29, Hot100 #1 for 2 weeks, 13 total weeks, 127 points
30	Mitch Ryder and the Detroit Wheels	"Devil with a Blue Dress On and Good Golly Miss Molly"	New Voice 817	July 1966	September 1966	32	1.00	US Billboard 1966 #30, Hot100 #4 for 4 weeks, 16 total weeks, 126 points
31	The Rolling Stones	"19th Nervous Breakdown"	London 9823	December 8, 1965	February 12, 1966	24	1.00	US Billboard 1966 #31, Hot100 #2 for 3 weeks, 10 total weeks, 125 points
32	The Vogues	"Five O'Clock World"	Co & Ce 232	1965	October 1965	39	1.00}	US Billboard 1966 #32, Hot100 #4 for 2 weeks, 14 total weeks, 125 points
33	The Lovin' Spoonful	"Daydream"	Kama Sutra 208	December 1965	February 19, 1966	34	1.00	US Billboard 1966 #33, Hot100 #2 for 2 weeks, 12 total weeks, 119 points
34	Donovan	"Mellow Yellow"	Epic 10098	October 1966	October 1966	33	1.00	US Billboard 1966 #34, Hot100 #2 for 3 weeks, 12 total weeks, 118 points
35	Jimmy Ruffin	"What Becomes of the Brokenhearted"	Soul 35022	February 1966	June 3, 1966	100	1.50	US Billboard 1966 #35, Hot100 #7 for 2 weeks, 17 total weeks, US R&B 1966 #6, R&B #1 for 4 weeks, 13 total weeks, 118 points
36	Bobby Hebb	"Sunny"	Philips 40365	February 21, 1966	June 1966	22	1.00}	US Billboard 1966 #36, Hot100 #2 for 2 weeks, 15 total weeks, 114 points
37	The Beatles	"Yellow Submarine" / "Eleanor Rigby"	Capitol 5651	May 26, 1966	August 8, 1966	27	2.50	US Billboard 1966 #37, Hot100 #2 for 1 weeks, 9 total weeks, 113 points
38	Simon and Garfunkel	"I Am a Rock"	Columbia 4-43396	March 10, 1964 + June 1965	September 13, 1965	36	1.25	US Billboard 1965 #38, Hot100 #1 for 2 weeks, 14 total weeks, Grammy Hall of Fame 1998, National Recording Registry 2012, 111 points
39	Roger Williams	"Born Free"	Kapp 767	December 8, 1965	July 1966	39	1.00	US Billboard 1966 #39, Hot100 #7 for 1 week, 21 total weeks, 111 points, Top Easy Listening Singles 1966 #1, Easy Listening Singles #1 for 6 weeks, 24 total weeks, 477 points
40	Stevie Wonder	"Uptight (Everything's Alright)"	Tamla 54124	September 3, 1965	November 22, 1965	35	1.50	US Billboard 1966 #40, Hot100 #3 for 2 weeks, 14 total weeks, 110 points, Top Soul Singles 1966 #3, Hot Soul Singles #1 for 5 weeks, 15 total weeks, 266 points, from Up-Tight - Tamla 268

   Billboard Top Soul Singles 1966

1	The Temptations	"Ain't Too Proud to Beg"	Gordy 7054	January 11, 1966	May 3, 1966	112	1.50	US Billboard 1966 #91, Hot100 #13 for 1 weeks, 13 total weeks, 57 points, Top Soul Singles 1966 #1, Hot Soul Singles #1 for 8 weeks, 17 total weeks, 313 points, from Gettin' Ready - Gordy 918
2	Wilson Pickett	"634-5789 (Soulsville, U.S.A.)"	Atlantic 2386	December 20, 1965	January 1966	69	1.00	US Billboard 1966 #124, Hot100 #13 for 3 weeks, 11 total weeks, 37 points, Top Soul Singles 1966 #2, Hot Soul Singles #1 for 7 weeks, 16 total weeks, 280 points, from The Exciting Wilson Pickett - Atlantic 8129
3	Stevie Wonder	"Uptight (Everything's Alright)"						see number 40
4	Sam and Dave	"Hold On I'm Comin'"	Stax 189	January 1966	March 1966	69	1.00	US Billboard 1966 #195, Hot100 #21 for 1 week, 13 total weeks, Top Soul Singles 1966 #4, Hot Soul Singles #1 for 1 weeks, 20 total weeks, 262 points, from Hold On, I'm Comin'- Stax 708
5	The Temptations	"Beauty Is Only Skin Deep"	Gordy 7055	May 11, 1966	August 4, 1966	69	1.25	US Billboard 1966 #63, Hot100 #3 for 1 week, 12 total weeks, 81 points, Top Soul Singles 1966 #5, Hot Soul Singles #1 for 5 weeks, 15 total weeks, 258 points, from Gordy single 7055.

| Top Easy Listening Singles 1966

1	Roger Williams	"Born Free"						see number 39
2	Frank Sinatra	"Strangers In The Night"						see number 18
3	Jack Jones	"The Impossible Dream (The Quest)"	Kapp 755	January 11, 1966	April 1966	264	2.00	US Billboard 1966 #295, Hot100 #35 for 1 weeks, 13 total weeks, Top Easy Listening Singles 1966 #3, Easy Listening Singles #1 for 1 week, 22 total weeks, 293 points
4	Margaret Whiting	"The Wheel of Hurt"	London 101	September 1967	November 1966	187	1.00	US Billboard 1968 #230, Hot100 #32 for 3 weeks, 12 total weeks, Top Easy Listening Singles 1966 #4, Easy Listening Singles #1 for 4 weeks, 24 total weeks, 289 points, National Recording Registry 2003
5	Ray Conniff & The Singers	"Somewhere, My Love"	Columbia 43626	August 29, 1966	October 23, 1966	226	2.00	US Billboard 1966 #229, Hot100 #26 for 1 week, 11 total weeks, Top Easy Listening Singles 1966 #5, Easy Listening Singles #1 for 4 weeks, 18 total weeks, 281 points, Grammy Hall of Fame 2004

   Top Rock Tracks 1966 (unofficial)

1	The Beach Boys	"Good Vibrations"						see number 12, Top Rock Tracks 1966 #1, from Capitol single 5676.
2	The Beatles	"Day Tripper"	Capitol 5555	October 16, 1965	December 3, 1965	169	2.00	US Billboard 1966 #2, Hot100 #20 for 2 weeks, 9 total weeks, 4 points, Top Rock Tracks 1966 #2, from Capitol single 5555.
3	The Beatles	"And Your Bird Can Sing"	Capitol 2576	April 26, 1966	August 5, 1966			Top Rock Tracks 1966 #3, from "Revolver - Capitol 2576."
4	The Beatles	"Got to Get You into My Life"	Capitol 2576	June 17, 1966	August 5, 1966			Top Rock Tracks 1966 #4, from "Revolver - Capitol 2576."
5	The Lovin' Spoonful	"Summer In The City"						see number 6, Top Rock Tracks 1966 #5, from "Hums Of The Lovin' Spoonful - Kama Sutra 8054."
6	The Who	"My Generation"	Decca 31877	December 22, 1966	February 13, 1967	15	2.50	Top Rock Tracks 1966 #6, US Billboard 1966 #84, Hot100 #74 for 1 week, 5 total weeks, 123 points, Top Rock Tracks 1966 #6, from "The Who Sings My Generation - Decca 4664."
7	The Animals	"Don't Bring Me Down"	MGM 13514	April 13, 1966	May 17, 1966	59	1.25	US Billboard 1966 #117, Hot100 #12 for 1 week, 10 total weeks, 106 points, Grammy Hall of Fame 1998, Top Rock Tracks 1966 #7, from MGM single 13514.
8	The Rolling Stones	"Paint It Black"						see number 14, Top Rock Tracks 1966 #8, from "Aftermath - London 476."
9	The Supremes	"You Keep Me Hangin' On"						see number 11, Top Rock Tracks 1966 #9, from "The Supremes Sing Holland–Dozier–Holland - Motown 650."
10	The Beatles	"Eleanor Rigby"	Capitol 5715	June 6, 1966	August 5, 1966	15	2.50	US Billboard 1966 #127, Hot100 #11 for 2 weeks, 10 total weeks, 123 points, Grammy Hall of Fame 2011, Top Rock Tracks 1966 #10, from "Revolver - Capitol 2576."
11	The Kinks	"Till the End of the Day"	Reprise 0454	October 30, 1965	March 2, 1966	59	6.00	Top Rock Tracks 1966 #11, US Billboard 1966 #117, Hot100 #50 for 1 week, 8 total weeks, 106 points, Grammy Hall of Fame 1998, from "The Kink Kontroversy - Reprise 6197."

== Top American hits on record ==
Single – Artist	Composer
Winter
"The Sound of Silence" – Simon & Garfunkel	w.m. Paul Simon
"Shapes of Things"—The Yardbirds	w. Keith Relf m. Jim McCarty, Paul Samwell-Smith; guitar solo by Jeff Beck
"We Can Work It Out" – The Beatles	w.m. John Lennon and Paul McCartney
"Fever" – The McCoys	w.m. Eddie Cooley and John Davenport (a pseudonym for Otis Blackwell)
"Ebb Tide" – The Righteous Brothers	w. Carl Sigman, m. Robert Maxwell
"England Swings" – Roger Miller	w.m. Roger Miller
"Make the World Go Away" – Eddy Arnold	w.m. Hank Cochran
"When Liking Turns to Loving" - Ronnie Dove	w.m. Kenny Young
"She's Just My Style" – Gary Lewis and the Playboys	w.m. Gary Lewis, Leon Russell, Snuff Garrett, Al Capps
"Flowers on the Wall" – The Statler Brothers	w.m. Lew DeWitt
"Help Me Girl" – Eric Burdon	w.m. Scott English, Larry Weiss
"Five O'Clock World" – The Vogues	w.m. Allen Reynolds
"Day Tripper" – The Beatles	w.m. John Lennon and Paul McCartney
"The Men in My Little Girl's Life" – Mike Douglas	w.m. Gloria Shayne, Eddie Dean and Mary Candy
"No Matter What Shape (Your Stomach's In)" – The T-Bones	m. Granville Burland
"A Must to Avoid" – Herman's Hermits	w.m. Steve Barri and P. F. Sloan
"You Didn't Have to Be So Nice" – The Lovin' Spoonful	w.m. John Sebastian and Steve Boone
"Barbara Ann" – The Beach Boys	w.m. Fred Fassert
"My Love" – Petula Clark	w.m. Tony Hatch
"Jenny Take a Ride" – Mitch Ryder and the Detroit Wheels	w.m. Richard Penniman, Enotris Johnson and Bob Crewe
"Lightnin' Strikes" – Lou Christie	w.m. Lou Christie and Twyla Herbert
"Crying Time" – Ray Charles	w.m. Buck Owens
"Uptight (Everything's Alright)" – Stevie Wonder	w.m. Henry Cosby, Stevie Wonder and Sylvia May
"My World Is Empty without You" – The Supremes	w.m. Brian Holland, Lamont Dozier and Eddie Holland
"Don't Mess with Bill" – The Marvelettes	w.m. Smokey Robinson
"These Boots Are Made for Walkin'" – Nancy Sinatra	w.m. Lee Hazlewood
"The Ballad of the Green Berets" – Sgt. Barry Sadler	w.m. Robin Moore and Barry Sadler
"California Dreamin'" – The Mamas & the Papas	w.m. John Phillips and Michelle Phillips
"Elusive Butterfly" – Bob Lind	w.m. Bob Lind
"Working My Way Back to You" – The Four Seasons	w.m. Sandy Linzer, Denny Randell
"Listen People" – Herman's Hermits	w.m. Graham Gouldman
"Nowhere Man" – The Beatles	w.m. John Lennon and Paul McCartney
"I Fought the Law" – Bobby Fuller Four	w.m. Sonny Curtis
"Homeward Bound" – Simon & Garfunkel	w.m. Paul Simon
"Daydream" – The Lovin' Spoonful	w.m. John Sebastian
"(You're My) Soul and Inspiration" – The Righteous Brothers	w.m. Barry Mann and Cynthia Weil
.
Spring
"Sure Gonna Miss Her" – Gary Lewis and the Playboys	w.m. Bobby Russell
"Secret Agent Man" – Johnny Rivers	w.m. P. F. Sloan and Steve Barri
"I'm So Lonesome I Could Cry" – B. J. Thomas	w.m. Hank Williams
"Don't Bring Me Down" – The Animals
"Inside-Looking Out" – The Animals	w.m. Eric Burdon
"Time Won't Let Me" – The Outsiders	w.m. Tom King and Chet Kelley
"Good Lovin'" – The Young Rascals
"Kicks" – Paul Revere & the Raiders	w.m. Barry Mann and Cynthia Weil
"Sloop John B" – The Beach Boys	w.m. Traditional
"Let's Start All Over Again" - Ronnie Dove	w.m. Al Kasha and Joel Hirschhorn
"Monday, Monday" – The Mamas & the Papas	w.m. John Phillips
"Leaning on the Lamp Post" – Herman's Hermits	w. L. Arthur Rose and Douglas Furber, m. Noel Gay
"Rainy Day Women #12 & 35" – Bob Dylan	w.m. Bob Dylan
"Over Under Sideways Down" – The Yardbirds	w. Keith Relf m. Jim McCarty, Chris Dreja, Paul Samwell-Smith, guitar solo Jeff Beck
"Gloria" – Shadows of Knight	w.m. Van Morrison
"How Does That Grab You, Darlin'?" – Nancy Sinatra	w.m. Lee Hazlewood
"Message to Michael" – Dionne Warwick	w. Hal David, m. Burt Bacharach
"When a Man Loves a Woman" – Percy Sledge	w.m. Calvin Lewis and Andrew Wright
"A Groovy Kind of Love" – The Mindbenders	w.m. Carole Bayer Sager and Toni Wine
"Love Is Like an Itching in My Heart" – The Supremes	w.m. Brian Holland, Lamont Dozier and Eddie Holland
"Paint It Black" – The Rolling Stones	w.m. Mick Jagger and Keith Richards
"I Am a Rock" – Simon & Garfunkel	w.m. Paul Simon
"Did You Ever Have to Make Up Your Mind?" – The Lovin' Spoonful	w.m. John Sebastian
"It's a Man's Man's Man's World" – James Brown	w.m. James Brown and Betty Jean Newsome
"Green Grass" – Gary Lewis and the Playboys	w.m. Roger Cook, Roger Greenaway
"Strangers in the Night" – Frank Sinatra	w.m. Charles Singleton, Eddie Snyder, Bert Kaempfert
"Barefootin'" – Robert Parker	w.m. Robert Parker
"Cool Jerk" – The Capitols	w.m. Donald Storball
"96 Tears" – Question Mark & the Mysterians	w.m. Rudy Martinez
"Red Rubber Ball" – The Cyrkle	w.m. Paul Simon, Bruce Woodley
"Paperback Writer" – The Beatles	w.m. John Lennon, Paul McCartney
"You Don't Have to Say You Love Me" – Dusty Springfield	w.m. Pino Donaggio, Vito Pallavicini, Vicki Wickham, Simon Napier-Bell
"Sweet Talkin' Guy" – The Chiffons	w.m. Barbara Baer, Elliot Greenberg, Doug Morris, Robert Schwartz
.
Summer
"Hanky Panky" – Tommy James and the Shondells
"Wild Thing" – The Troggs	Chip Taylor
"Little Girl" – Syndicate of Sound
"Along Comes Mary" – The Association
"Li'l Red Riding Hood" – Sam the Sham and the Pharaohs	w.m. Ronald Blackwell
"Hungry" – Paul Revere & the Raiders
"The Pied Piper" – Crispian St. Peters
"Happy Summer Days" - Ronnie Dove	w.m. Larry Kusik, Ritchie Adams, Wes Farrell
"I Saw Her Again" – The Mamas & the Papas
"Sweet Pea" – Tommy Roe
"Summer in the City" – The Lovin' Spoonful	w. John Sebastian and Mark Sebastian, m. John Sebastian and Steve Boone
"Somewhere, My Love" – Ray Conniff and the Singers	w. Paul Francis Webster, m. Maurice Jarre
"They're Coming to Take Me Away, Ha-Haaa!" – Napoleon XIV
"Sunny" – Bobby Hebb
"See You in September" – The Happenings
"Sunshine Superman" – Donovan	w.m. Donovan
"You Can't Hurry Love" – The Supremes	w.m. Holland-Dozier-Holland
"Yellow Submarine" – The Beatles	w.m. Lennon–McCartney
"Summertime" – Billy Stewart
"The Land of 1000 Dances" – Wilson Pickett	w.m. Chris Kenner
"Working in the Coal Mine" – Lee Dorsey	w.m. Allen Toussaint
"Bus Stop" – The Hollies	w.m. Graham Gouldman
"Guantanamera" – The Sandpipers
"Cherish" – The Association	w.m. Terry Kirkman
"Wouldn't It Be Nice" – The Beach Boys	w.m. Brian Wilson, Tony Asher, Mike Love
"Beauty Is Only Skin Deep" – The Temptations
"Black Is Black" – Los Bravos	w.m. Michelle Grainger, Tony Hayes, Steve Wadey
"Reach Out I'll Be There" – Four Tops	w.m. Holland-Dozier-Holland
"Cherry, Cherry" – Neil Diamond
"I Really Don't Want to Know" - Ronnie Dove
.
Autumn
"Born Free" – Roger Williams	w.m. John Barry, Don Black
"Cry" - Ronnie Dove	w.m. Churchill Kohlman
"Dandy" – Herman's Hermits
"Devil With A Blue Dress On / Good Golly Miss Molly" – Mitch Ryder & the Detroit Wheels
"Good Thing" – Paul Revere & the Raiders
"Good Vibrations" – The Beach Boys	w.m. Brian Wilson, Mike Love
"Hooray for Hazel" – Tommy Roe
"I'm a Believer" – The Monkees	w.m. Neil Diamond
"I'm Ready for Love" – Martha and the Vandellas
"I'm Your Puppet" – James & Bobby Purify
"I've Got You Under My Skin" – The Four Seasons
"(I Know) I'm Losing You" – The Temptations
"If I Were a Carpenter" – Bobby Darin	w.m. Tim Hardin
"Lady Godiva" – Peter and Gordon
"Last Train to Clarksville" – The Monkees	w.m. Tommy Boyce, Bobby Hart
"Mellow Yellow" – Donovan	w.m. Donovan
"A Place in the Sun" – Stevie Wonder	w.m. Ronald Miller, Bryan Wells
"Poor Side of Town" – Johnny Rivers
"Psychotic Reaction" – Count Five
"Rain on the Roof" – The Lovin' Spoonful
"See See Rider" – Eric Burdon and the Animals
"Snoopy vs. the Red Baron" – The Royal Guardsmen
"Sugar Town" – Nancy Sinatra
"Tell It Like It Is" – Aaron Neville	w.m. George Davis and Lee Diamond
"That's Life" – Frank Sinatra	w.m. Dean Kay, Kelly Gordon
"Walk Away Renée" – The Left Banke
"What Becomes of the Brokenhearted" – Jimmy Ruffin	w.m. William Witherspoon, Paul Riser, James Dean
"Winchester Cathedral" – The New Vaudeville Band	w.m. Geoff Stephens
"You Keep Me Hangin' On" – The Supremes	w.m. Holland-Dozier-Holland

== British number one hits not included above ==
Winter

- "Keep On Running" – The Spencer Davis Group
- "Michelle" – The Overlanders
- "The Sun Ain't Gonna Shine (Anymore)" – The Walker Brothers

Spring

- "Somebody Help Me" – The Spencer Davis Group
- "Pretty Flamingo" – Manfred Mann

Summer

- "Sunny Afternoon" – The Kinks
- "Get Away" – Georgie Fame and the Blue Flames
- "With a Girl Like You" – The Troggs
- "All or Nothing" – Small Faces

Autumn

- "Distant Drums" – Jim Reeves
- "Green, Green Grass of Home" – Tom Jones

== Other hit singles ==
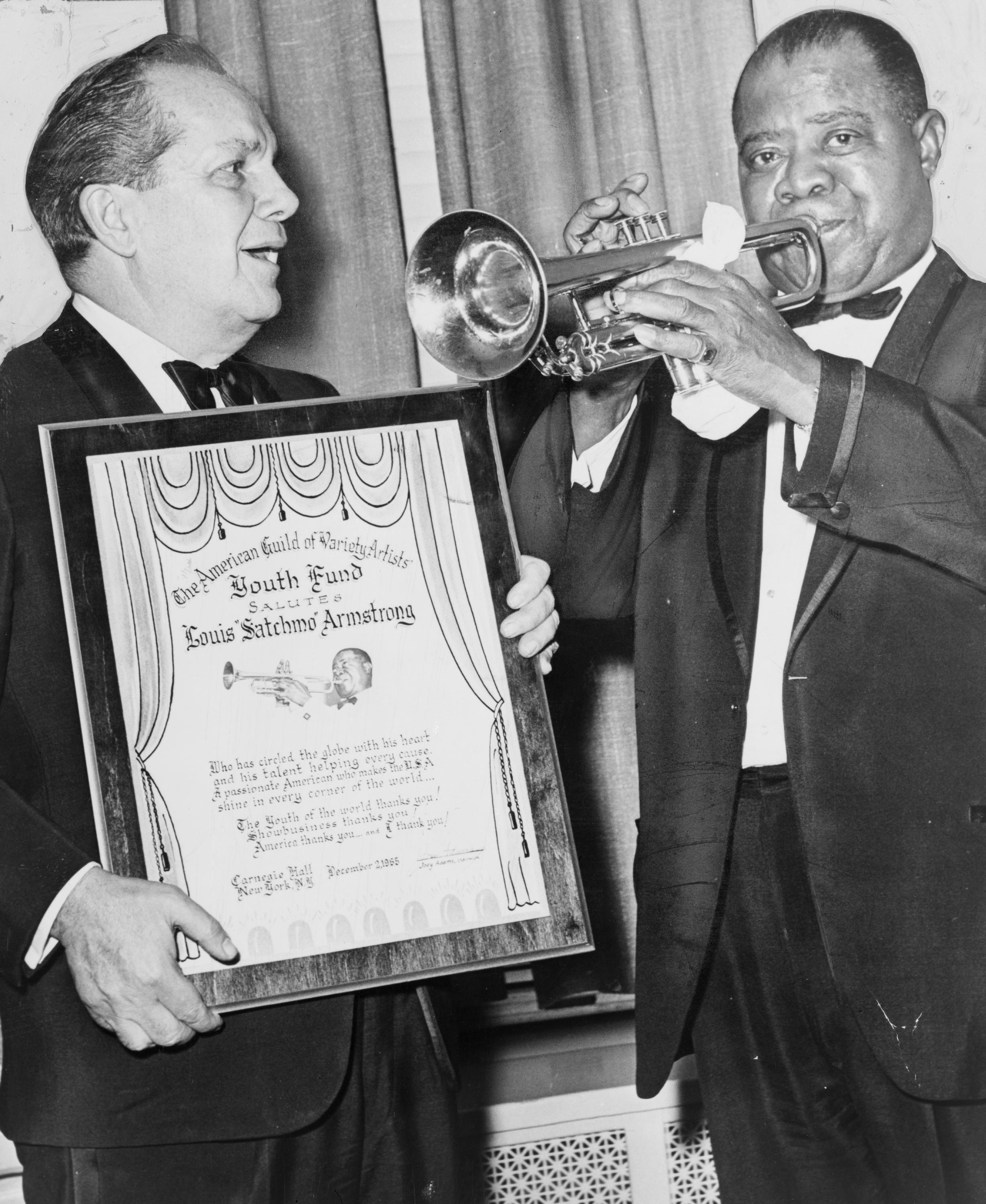
Louis Armstrong in 1966

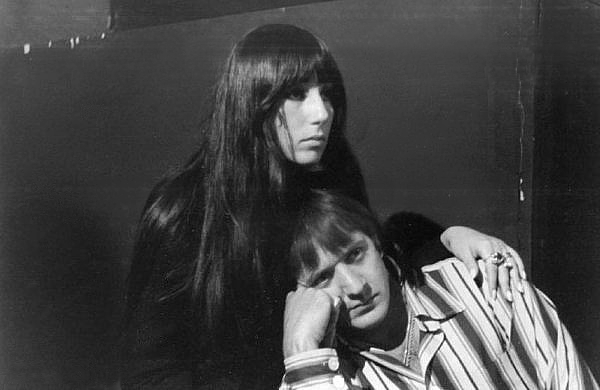
Sonny & Cher, 1966

(Not all of these were necessarily released as singles.)

- "7 and 7 Is" – Love
- "19th Nervous Breakdown" – The Rolling Stones
- "634-5789 (Soulsville, U.S.A.)" – Wilson Pickett
- "98.6" – Keith
- "A Hard Day's Night" – The Ramsey Lewis Trio
- "A Hazy Shade of Winter" – Simon & Garfunkel
- "A Legal Matter" – The Who
- "A Little Bit of Soap" – The Exciters
- "A Quick One, While He's Away" – The Who
- "A Sign of the Times" – Petula Clark
- "A Well Respected Man" – The Kinks
- "Ain't Too Proud to Beg" – The Temptations
- "Alfie" – Cilla Black
- "All Tomorrow's Parties" – The Velvet Underground and Nico
- "And Your Bird Can Sing" – The Beatles
- "Anyway That You Want Me" – The Troggs
- "April Come She Will" – Simon & Garfunkel
- "Baby Don't You Do It" – The Poets
- "Bang Bang (My Baby Shot Me Down)" – Cher
- "Batman Theme" – The Marketts
- "Beck's Bolero" – Jeff Beck, Jimmy Page, Keith Moon, Nicky Hopkins, John Paul Jones
- "Biff Bang Pow" – The Creation
- "Blues from an Airplane" – Jefferson Airplane
- "Blue Turns to Grey" – Cliff Richard and The Shadows
- "Boa Constrictor" – Johnny Cash
- "Boris the Spider" – The Who
- "Born Free" – Matt Monro
- "But It's Alright" – J.J. Jackson
- "Bye Bye Blues" – Andy Williams
- "Call Me" – Chris Montez
- "Can't Help Thinking About Me" – David Bowie and The Lower Third
- "Caroline No" – Brian Wilson
- "Circles" – Les Fleur de Lys
- "(Come 'Round Here) I'm the One You Need" – The Miracles
- "Coming on Strong" – Brenda Lee
- "Coming Home Soldier" – Bobby Vinton
- "The Dangling Conversation" – Simon & Garfunkel
- "Diddy Wah Diddy" – Captain Beefheart
- "Dirty Water" – The Standells
- "Do Anything You Say" – David Bowie and The Buzz
- "Double Shot (Of My Baby's Love)" – The Swingin' Medallions
- "The Duck" – Jackie Lee
- "Dum-De-Da" – Bobby Vinton
- "Eight Miles High" – The Byrds
- "Eleanor Rigby" – The Beatles (B-side to Yellow Submarine)
- "Femme Fatale" – The Velvet Underground and Nico
- "Friday on My Mind" – The Easybeats
- "Games That Lovers Play" – Eddie Fisher, Wayne Newton, Connie Francis
- "Georgy Girl" – The Seekers
- "Get Out of My Life, Woman" – Lee Dorsey
- "Get Ready" – The Temptations
- "Go Away Little Girl" – The Happenings
- "God Only Knows" – The Beach Boys (B-side to Wouldn't It Be Nice)
- "Good Day Sunshine" – The Beatles
- "Got to Get You Into My Life" – The Beatles
- "Gracias a la vida" – Violeta Parra
- "Happenings Ten Years Time Ago" – The Yardbirds
- "Happy Jack" – The Who
- "Have You Seen Your Mother, Baby, Standing in the Shadow?" – The Rolling Stones
- "He" – The Righteous Brothers
- "Here, There and Everywhere" – The Beatles
- "Hey Joe" – The Jimi Hendrix Experience
- "Hey Joe" – The Leaves
- "Holy Cow" – Lee Dorsey
- "How Can I Tell Her It's Over" – Andy Williams
- "Hungry Freaks, Daddy" – The Mothers of Invention
- "I Am a Rock" – Simon & Garfunkel
- "I Can Take You to the Sun" – The Misunderstood
- "I Dig Everything" – David Bowie and The Buzz
- "If Every Day Was Like Christmas" – Elvis Presley
- "I'll Be Your Mirror" – The Velvet Underground and Nico
- "I'm a Boy" – The Who
- "(I'm a) Road Runner" – Junior Walker & the Allstars
- "(I'm Not Your) Steppin' Stone" – The Monkees
- "I'm Only Sleeping" – The Beatles
- "I'm So Glad" – Cream
- "In the Arms of Love" – Andy Williams
- "I Want You/Just Like Tom Thumb's Blues – Bob Dylan
- "Pledging My Time – Bob Dylan (B-side to Rainy Day Women #12 & 35)
- "I Can't Control Myself" – The Troggs
- "(I Can't Get No) Satisfaction" – Otis Redding
- "I Can't Let Go" – The Hollies
- "Can't Seem to Make You Mine" – The Seeds (re-released from 1965)
- "I Feel Free" – Cream
- "I Had Too Much To Dream Last Night" – The Electric Prunes
- "I Know There's An Answer" – The Beach Boys
- "I Put A Spell On You" – The Animals
- "I Want To Be With You" – Dee Dee Warwick
- "I Want to Go with You" – Eddy Arnold
- "Just Like a Woman"/"Obviously 5 Believers" – Bob Dylan
- "In the Country" – Cliff Richard and The Shadows
- "It Takes Two" – Marvin Gaye with Kim Weston
- "The Joker Went Wild" - Brian Hyland
- "Jug Band Music" – The Lovin' Spoonful
- "Just Like Me" – Paul Revere & the Raiders
- "The Kids Are Alright" – The Who
- "Lady Jane" – The Rolling Stones
- "Leaves That Are Green" – Simon & Garfunkel
- "Leopard-Skin Pill-Box Hat" – Bob Dylan
- "Like A Baby" – Len Barry
- "Little Man" – Sonny & Cher
- "Love Is Like an Itching in My Heart" – The Supremes
- "Love Letters" – Elvis Presley
- "Love Me, I'm a Liberal" – Phil Ochs
- "Loving You Is Sweeter Than Ever" – Four Tops
- "Mame" – Bobby Darin
- "Mame" – Louis Armstrong
- "Maudie" – The Animals
- "Maintaining My Cool" – The Sonics
- "Makin' Time" – The Creation
- "Mama Told Me Not To Come" – Eric Burdon
- "(The Marines Have Just Landed on the Shores of) Santo Domingo" – Phil Ochs
- "May Each Day" – Andy Williams
- "Mission:Impossible" – Jack Jones
- "My Brother Makes the Noises for the Talkies" – Bonzo Dog Doo-Dah Band
- "My Heart's Symphony" – Gary Lewis & the Playboys
- "The More I See You" – Chris Montez
- "Mother's Little Helper" – The Rolling Stones
- "Mr. Farmer"—The Seeds
- "Mr. Spaceman" – The Byrds
- "My Little Red Book" – Love
- "Nashville Cats" – The Lovin' Spoonful
- "No Milk Today" – Herman's Hermits
- "The One on the Right Is on the Left" – Johnny Cash
- "One Monkey Don't Stop No Show" – The Animals
- "One of Us Must Know (Sooner or Later)/Queen Jane Approximately – Bob Dylan
- "Opus 17" – The Four Seasons
- "Out of Time" – The Rolling Stones
- "Painter Man" – The Creation
- "Pandora's Golden Heepie Jeebies" – The Association
- "Patsy Girl" – Ross MacManus
- "A Place in the Sun" – The Shadows
- "Psycho" – The Sonics
- "Psycho Daisies" – The Yardbirds (B-side to "Happenings Ten Years Time Ago")
- "Pushin' too Hard" – The Seeds (re-released from 1965)
- "Rain" – The Beatles (B-side to "Paperback Writer")
- "Respectable" – The Outsiders
- "Reverberation (Doubt)" – 13th Floor Elevators
- "Rhapsody in the Rain" – Lou Christie
- "Richard Cory" – Simon & Garfunkel
- "Rubber Band" – David Bowie
- "Sad Eyed Lady of the Lowlands" – Bob Dylan
- "Scarborough Fair" – Simon & Garfunkel
- "Second Hand Rose" – Barbra Streisand
- "She Comes in Colors" – Love
- "She Said She Said" – The Beatles
- "Sit Down, I Think I Love You" – Buffalo Springfield
- "Sitting in the Park" – Georgie Fame
- "Society's Child (Baby I've Been Thinking)" – Janis Ian
- "Somebody to Love" – The Great Society
- "Solitary Man" – Neil Diamond
- "Somewhere" – Len Barry
- "Spanish Eyes" – Al Martino
- "Spanish Nights and You" - Connie Francis
- "Spoonful" – Cream
- "Standing in the Shadows of Love" – Four Tops
- "Stealin'" – Grateful Dead
- "Stone Free" – The Jimi Hendrix Experience
- "Stop! Stop! Stop!" – The Hollies
- "Stuck Inside of Mobile with the Memphis Blues Again" – Bob Dylan
- "Stupid Girl" – The Rolling Stones
- "Substitute" – The Who
- "Suicida" – Os Mutantes
- "Sunday Morning" – The Velvet Underground and Nico
- "The Ballad of the Green Berets" – Sgt. Barry Sadler (the Top Song of 1966, according to Billboard)
- "Taxman" – The Beatles
- "Tell It To The Rain" – The Four Seasons
- "That's Not Me" – The Beach Boys
- "There But For Fortune" – Phil Ochs
- "There Will Never Be Another You" – Chris Montez
- "Think" – The Rolling Stones
- "This Door Swings Both Ways" – Herman's Hermits
- "This Old Heart of Mine (Is Weak For You)" – The Isley Brothers
- "Tomorrow Never Knows" – The Beatles
- "Try a Little Tenderness" – Otis Redding
- "Try Too Hard" – The Dave Clark Five
- "Turn-Down Day" – The Cyrkle
- "Twinkle Toes" – Roy Orbison
- "Under My Thumb" – The Rolling Stones
- "Visions of Johanna" – Bob Dylan
- "Visions" – Cliff Richard
- "Wade in the Water" – The Ramsey Lewis Trio
- "Walking My Cat Named Dog" – Norma Tanega
- "Warm and Tender Love" – Percy Sledge
- "What Goes On" – The Beatles (B-side to Nowhere Man)
- "Who Am I?" – Petula Clark
- "Who Do You Think You're Fooling?" – Captain Beefheart
- "Words of Love" – The Mamas & the Papas
- "You Baby" – The Turtles
- "You Better Run" – The Young Rascals
- "You Can't Rollerskate in a Buffalo Herd" - Roger Miller
- "(You Don't Have To) Paint Me a Picture" – Gary Lewis & the Playboys
- "You Still Believe In Me" – The Beach Boys
- "You Were On My Mind" – Crispian St. Peters
- "You Won't Be Leaving" – Herman's Hermits
- "Younger Girl" – The Critters
- "You're Gonna Hear from Me" – Andy Williams
- "(You're Gonna) Hurt Yourself" – Frankie Valli
- "You're Gonna Miss Me" – The 13th Floor Elevators
- "You're On My Mind" – The Animals

== Published popular music ==
- "Alfie" w. Hal David m. Burt Bacharach from the film Alfie
- "Big Spender" w. Dorothy Fields m. Cy Coleman from the musical Sweet Charity
- "If I Were a Carpenter" w.m. Tim Hardin
- "The Rhythm of Life" w. Dorothy Fields m. Cy Coleman from the musical Sweet Charity
- "Sunny" w.m. Bobby Hebb
- "Wedding Bell Blues" w.m. Laura Nyro

== Other notable songs ==
- "Ces Gens-Là" by Jacques Brel
- "La maison où j'ai grandi" ("Il ragazzo della via Gluck") by Adriano Celentano, French lyrics by Eddy Marnay
- "Nessuno Mi Può Giudicare/Lei Mi Aspetta" by Gene Pitney
- "La Poupée qui fait non" by Franck Gérald (words) and Michel Polnareff (music)
- "Parce Que Tu Crois" by Charles Aznavour
- "Les sucettes" by Serge Gainsbourg

== Classical music ==
=== Premieres ===
Composer	Composition	Date	Location	Performers
Stockhausen, Karlheinz	Solo, Nr. 19 (2 versions, for trombone and for flute)	24 April	NHK Studios, Tokyo	Yasusuke Hirata; Ryū Noguchi
Stockhausen, Karlheinz	Telemusik, Nr. 20	24 April	NHK Studios, Tokyo	Stockhausen
Villa-Lobos, Heitor	Symphony No. 9	16 May	Caracas	Philadelphia Orchestra – Ormandy
Barraqué, Jean	Chant après chant	23 June	Palais des Fêtes, Strasbourg	Berthe Kal / André Krust / Les Percussions de Strasbourg – Bruck

=== Compositions ===
- Gilbert Amy
  - Cycle, for percussion sextet
  - Trajectoires, for violin and orchestra
- Malcolm Arnold – Fantasy for solo flute
- Jean Barraqué – Chant après chant for soprano, piano, and six percussionists
- George Crumb – Eleven Echoes of Autumn (Echoes I) for violin, alto flute, clarinet, and piano
- Mario Davidovsky
  - Junctures for flute, clarinet, and violin
  - Synchronisms No. 4 for chorus and tape
- Ulf Grahn – Symphony no 1
- Erhard Karkoschka – Quattrologe, for string quartet
- Harald Sæverud – Symphony no 9
- John Serry Sr. – Concerto for Free Bass Accordion
- Roger Sessions – Symphony No. 6
- Dmitri Shostakovich – String Quartet No.11 in F minor, Op. 122
- Karlheinz Stockhausen –
  - Adieu (für Wolfgang Sebastian Meyer), for wind quintet, Nr. 21
  - Solo, for a melody instrument with feedback, Nr. 19
  - Telemusik, electronic and concrete music, Nr. 20
- Robert Ward – Fiesta Processional

== Opera ==
- Samuel Barber – Antony and Cleopatra
- Vittorio Giannini – Servant of Two Masters
- Jorge Peña Hen – La Cenicienta (Cinderella)
- Mark Kopytman – Casa Mare
- Peter Westergaard – Mr and Mrs Discobbolos
- Grace Williams – The Parlour

== Musical theater ==
- The Apple Tree – Broadway production opened at the Shubert Theatre and ran for 463 performances
- Breakfast at Tiffany's – Broadway-bound production (closed in previews)
- Cabaret (John Kander & Fred Ebb) – Broadway production opened at the Broadhurst Theatre and ran for 1,165 performances
- Funny Girl (Jule Styne and Bob Merrill) – London production
- I Do! I Do! – Broadway production opened at the 46th Street Theatre and ran for 560 performances
- It's a Bird...It's a Plane...It's Superman – Broadway production opened at the Alvin Theatre and ran for 129 performances
- The Mad Show – Off-Broadway production
- Mame – Broadway production opened at the Winter Garden Theatre and ran for 1,508 performances
- The Penny Friend – Off-Broadway production
- Sweet Charity (Music: Cy Coleman Lyrics: Dorothy Fields Book: Neil Simon) – Broadway production opened at the Palace Theatre and ran for 608 performances
- Wait a Minim! – Off-Broadway production

== Musical films ==
- A Funny Thing Happened on the Way to the Forum
- Alibaba Aur 40 Chor, with music by Usha Khanna
- Bhimanjaneya Yuddham, with music by T. V. Raju
- Dancing the Sirtaki
- Dus Lakh
- Fiebre de juventud, starring Enrique Guzmán
- The Glass Bottom Boat starring Doris Day
- Hold On! starring Herman's Hermits
- Mera Saaya
- Nichigeki [Kayama Yuzo sho] yori–utau wakadaisho, starring Yūzō Kayama (concert film)
- Paradise, Hawaiian Style starring Elvis Presley
- Stop the World – I Want to Get Off
- The Big T.N.T. Show (concert film)

== Musical television ==
- Brigadoon starring Robert Goulet and Sally Ann Howes

== Births ==
- January 1
  - Crazy Legs, Puerto Rican breakdancer (Rock Steady Crew)
  - Lee Won-jong, South Korean actor
- January 3 – Martin Galway, Northern Irish composer
- January 4 – Deana Carter, American country singer-songwriter, musician
- January 5
  - Kate Schellenbach, American punk rock drummer (Luscious Jackson) and television producer
  - Rowetta, English singer
- January 6
  - Sharon Cuneta, Filipina singer and TV personality
  - A. R. Rahman, Indian composer, singer-songwriter, music producer, musician and philanthropist
  - Jesse Dylan, American film director and production executive (son of Bob Dylan and Sara Dylan)
- January 7 – Ehab Tawfik, Egyptian singer
- January 8 – Andrew Wood, singer (Mother Love Bone) (died 1990)
- January 9 – Jan Johansen, Swedish singer
- January 14
  - Marko Hietala, Finnish rock bassist (Nightwish)
  - Paul Elstak, Dutch hardcore/gabber and happy hardcore DJ and record producer
- January 16 – Maxine Jones, American singer-songwriter and actress (En Vogue)
- January 17 – Shabba Ranks, dancehall artist
- January 20
  - Tracii Guns, American guitarist
  - Wes King, guitarist, singer
- January 21 – Wendy James, British rock singer (Transvision Vamp)
- January 25 – Samvel Yervinyan, Armenian violinist and composer
- January 30 – Hans Tutschku, German composer
- February 2 – Robert DeLeo (Stone Temple Pilots and Army of Anyone
- February 6 – Rick Astley, English singer-songwriter and radio personality
- February 11 – Tenor Saw, dancehall artist (died 1988)
- February 12 – Paul Crook, American guitarist (Anthrax)
- February 19 – Harald Blüchel, German record producer, songwriter, DJ and musician
- February 20
  - DJ Taucher, German trance DJ
  - Cindy Crawford, American model
- February 26 – Najwa Karam, Lebanese singer
- March 2
  - Howard Bernstein, producer
  - Nina Morato, French singer and songwriter
- March 3
  - Tone-Loc, rapper
  - Mikal Blue, English music producer, songwriter, engineer and mixer, collabotor with Colbie Caillat
- March 4 – Grand Puba, American rapper (Brand Nubian)
- March 7 – Atsushi Sakurai, Japanese singer (Buck-Tick)
- March 10 – Edie Brickell, singer-songwriter
- March 12 – David Daniels, countertenor
- March 18 – Jerry Cantrell, Alice in Chains
- March 19 – Anja Rupel, singer
- March 21 – DJ Premier, record producer
- March 22 – Park Joong-hoon, South Korean actor
- March 25 – Jeff Healey, Canadian guitarist (died 2008)
- March 28 – Salt, American rapper (Salt-N-Pepa)
- April 2 – Garnett Silk, reggae singer (died 1994)
- April 7 – Michaela Strachan, English television presenter and singer
- April 11 – Lisa Stansfield, singer
- April 13
  - Marc Ford (The Black Crowes)
  - Mando, Greek singer and songwriter
- April 15 – Samantha Fox, British model and singer
- April 18 – Ana Voog, singer-songwriter
- April 21 – Michael Franti, American singer-songwriter and guitarist (The Beatnigs and The Disposable Heroes of Hiphoprisy)
- April 28 – Too Short, rapper
- May 1 – Anne Fletcher, American film director and choreographer
- May 7 – Dafna Dekel, Israeli singer
- May 8
  - Blag Dahlia, American musician, producer and author
  - Marta Sánchez, vocalist and entertainer
- May 10 – Wade Domínguez, American actor, model, singer and dancer (died 1998)
- May 11 – Christoph Schneider, German rock musician (Rammstein)
- May 12 – Bebel Gilberto, Brazilian popular singer
- May 13
  - Alison Goldfrapp, English musician and record producer (Goldfrapp)
  - Darius Rucker (Hootie & the Blowfish)
  - Jeffrey Scott Holland, American artist and musician
- May 14 – Raphael Saadiq, singer-songwriter and record producer
- May 16 – Janet Jackson, African American singer-songwriter, dancer and actress
- May 19 – Neil Campbell, Scottish-born experimental musician
- May 20 – Dora, Portuguese singer
- May 22 – Johnny Gill, African American R&B singer-songwriter (New Edition)
- May 24 – Ella Guru, American painter and musician
- May 26 – Tommy Stewart (Godsmack)
- May 27 – Titi DJ, Indonesian pop singer
- May 28 – Theo Bleckmann, German vocalist and composer
- May 30 – Stephen Malkmus, American rock singer (Pavement)
- June 4 – Cecilia Bartoli, operatic mezzo-soprano
- June 6
  - Aadesh Shrivastava, composer and singer
  - Sean Yseult, American bass player (White Zombie and The Cramps)
- June 8
  - Jens Kidman, Swedish musician
  - Doris Pearson, R&B singer (Five Star)
- June 14 – Matt Freeman, bassist (Rancid)
- June 15 – Roberto Carnevale, Italian musician
- June 21 – Nucha, Portuguese singer
- June 22 – Schooly D, American rapper
- June 24 – Hope Sandoval, American singer-songwriter (Mazzy Star and Hope Sandoval & the Warm Inventions)
- June 26 – Jürgen Reil, German drummer (Kreator)
- June 28 – Bobby Bare, Jr., American musician
- June 30 – Louise Wener, English guitarist singer and songwriter (Sleeper)
- July 2 – Dave Parsons, English musician (Transvision Vamp, Bush)
- July 3 – Michael Allman, American musician
- July 7 – Gundula Krause, German violinist
- July 9 – Gayle and Gillian Blakeney, Australian actresses and singers
- July 11 – Melanie Appleby, Mel and Kim (died 1990)
- July 12
  - Taiji, Japanese bass player and songwriter (Loudness and X Japan) (died 2011)
  - Misato Watanabe, Japanese singer
  - Netinho, Brazilian singer and composer (d. (2026)
- July 13 – Gerald Levert, American singer (died 2006)
- July 14 – Tanya Donelly, American musician
- July 15 – Jason Bonham, drummer
- July 17
  - Lou Barlow, American guitarist and songwriter (Deep Wound, Dinosaur Jr., Sebadoh and The Folk Implosion)
  - Keith Elam, rapper & producer
- July 19 – Amila Glamočak, Bosnian Singer
- July 20 – Stone Gossard, American singer-songwriter and guitarist (Pearl Jam, Mother Love Bone, Brad, Temple of the Dog and Green River)
- July 24 – Mo-Do, Italian DJ (d. 2013)
- July 29 – Martina McBride, American country singer
- August 7 – Kristin Hersh, American singer-songwriter (Throwing Muses, 50 Foot Wave)
- August 11 – Juan Maria Solare, composer
- August 16 – Emanuel Kiriakou, American songwriter, producer, record executive, music publisher and multi-instrumentalist,
- August 19
  - Lilian Garcia, American singer and wrestling ring announcer
  - Lee Ann Womack, singer
- August 20 – Dimebag Darrell, American rock guitarist (Pantera) (died 2004)
- August 22 – GZA/Genius, rapper
- August 25
  - Derek Sherinian, American keyboardist
  - Terminator X, DJ
  - K7, American rapper
- August 26 – Shirley Manson, Scottish rock musician (Garbage)
- August 29 – Dan the Automator, American disc jockey (Handsome Boy Modeling School)
- August 30
  - Marvin McQuitty, American gospel drummer (died 2012)
  - Peter Cunnah, Northern Irish musician (D Ream)
- September 1 – Douglas McCarthy, English vocalist (Nitzer Ebb)
- September 2 – Yu Hayami, Japanese pop idol singer
- September 4 – Yanka Dyagileva, Russian singer
- September 5 – Achero Mañas, Spanish actor, director, and screenwriter
- September 8 – Carola Häggkvist, Swedish pop singer
- September 10 – Robin Goodridge (Bush)
- September 12 – Ben Folds, singer-songwriter
- September 17 – Chris Acland, English drummer and songwriter (Lush) (d. 1996)
- September 17 – Doug E. Fresh, American rapper, record producer and beatboxer
- September 20 – Nuno Bettencourt (Extreme)
- September 22 –
  - Moustafa Amar, Egyptian pop star
  - Keith Martin, American-Filipino R&B singer and songwriter (d. 2022)
- October 1 – Nina, Spanish singer and actress
- October 2 – Mousse T., DJ
- October 12 – Brian Kennedy, Irish musician and author
- October 14 – Brenda K. Starr, American singer and songwriter
- October 15
  - Eric Benét, gospel singer
  - Ingeborg, Belgian singer and television presenter
- October 18
  - Tim Cross, Sponge
  - Bill Stewart, American jazz drummer
- October 19 – Jon Favreau, American actor and filmmaker
- October 20 – Stefan Raab, German entertainer, television host, producer and businessman
- October 23 – Skúli Sverrisson, Icelandic composer and bassist
- October 31
  - Annabella Lwin, vocalist (Bow Wow Wow)
  - Ad-Rock, Beastie Boys
- November 6 – Paul Gilbert, American musician
- November 7 – Ayla, German trance, producer and DJ
- November 10 – Steve Mackey, English bassist (Pulp) (d. 2023)
- November 11 – Peaches, born Merrill Nisker, Canadian electronic musician and performance artist
- November 14 – Charles Hazlewood, English orchestral conductor
- November 16 – Christian Lorenz, keyboard player
- November 17
  - Jeff Buckley, singer-songwriter (died 1997)
  - Soup the Chemist, born Christopher Jose Cooper, pioneering American Christian hip hop rapper
  - Kate Ceberano, Australian singer and actress
- November 18 – Marusha, German-Greek disc jockey
- November 20 – Kevin Gilbert (musician), American singer, composer and instrumentalist
- November 23 – Charlie Grover (Sponge)
- November 24
  - Joseph "DJ Run" Simmons, Run D.M.C.
  - Dawn Robinson, American singer and actress (En Vogue)
- November 25 – Stacy Lattisaw, singer
- November 27 – Mark Spoon, German DJ, musician and record producer (Jam & Spoon) (d. 2006)
- December 4 – Masta Ace, rapper
- December 7
  - Gem Archer, English guitarist singer and songwriter (Oasis)
  - Louise Post, American singer (Veruca Salt)
- December 8 – Sinéad O'Connor, Irish pop singer-songwriter, priest, activist (died 2023)
- December 9 – Michael Foster, drummer for rock band FireHouse
- December 11 – Leon Lai, Hong Kong singer and actor
- December 12
  - Pops Fernandez, Filipina singer and TV personality
  - Greg Long, contemporary Christian musician
- December 20 – Chris Robinson, vocalist (The Black Crowes)
- December 28 – Kaliopi, Macedonian singer and songwriter
- December 29 – Jason Gould, American actor and singer

== Deaths ==
- January 29 – Pierre Mercure, Canadian bassoon player and composer, 39
- February 9 – Sophie Tucker, blues singer, 82
- February 10 – Billy Rose, impresario, 66
- February 13 – Marguerite Long, pianist, 87
- February 23 – Billy Kyle, jazz pianist, 51
- March – Mohamed El Qasabgi, composer
- March 29 – Jazz Gillum, harmonica player, 61 (shot)
- March 30 – Jelly d'Arányi, violinist, 72
- April 3 – Russel Crouse, librettist, 73
- April 19 – Javier Solís, Mexican ranchera and bolero singer, 34 (complications following gall bladder surgery)
- April 30 – Richard Fariña, folk singer, 29 (motorcycle accident)
- May 13 – Henrik Adam Due, violinist, music teacher, 75
- June 1 – Papa Jack Laine, bandleader, 92
- June 12 – Hermann Scherchen, conductor, 74
- June 17 – Johnny St. Cyr, jazz musician, 76
- July 3 – Deems Taylor, composer and music critic, 80
- July 18 – Bobby Fuller, singer and guitarist, 23 (possible suicide or murder)
- July 31 – Bud Powell, jazz pianist, 41
- August 2 – Boyd Raeburn, jazz musician, 52 (heart attack)
- August 2 or 3 – Tristan Klingsor, poet, painter and musician, 91
- August 4 – Helen Tamiris, dancer and choreographer, 61
- August 15 – Jan Kiepura, Polish tenor and actor, 64
- September 17 – Fritz Wunderlich, tenor, 35 (fell downstairs)
- September 26 – Helen Kane, singer, 62
- September 28 – Lucius "Lucky" Millinder, US bandleader, 56 (liver disease)
- October 3 – Dave Lambert, jazz musician, 49 (road accident)
- October 7
  - Johnny Kidd, British singer, 30 (car accident)
  - Smiley Lewis, R&B musician, 53 (stomach cancer)
- October 12 – Arthur Lourié, composer, 74
- October 26 – Alma Cogan, English singer, 34 (stomach cancer)
- October 17 – Karel Hruška, operatic tenor, 75
- October 29 – Wellman Braud, jazz musician, 75
- November 1
  - Alexis Roland-Manuel, composer, 75
  - Dick Roberts, guitar and banjo player, 69
- November 2 – Mississippi John Hurt, blues musician, 73 or 74
- November 6 – Washboard Sam, blues musician, 56 (heart disease)
- November 12 – Quincy Porter, composer, 69
- November 28 – Vittorio Giannini, opera composer, 63
- December 1 – Carter Stanley, bluegrass musician, half of The Stanley Brothers, 41 (alcohol-related)
- December 3 – Kui Lee, singer-songwriter, 34 (gland cancer)
- December 9 – Yuri Shaporin, composer, 79
- December 12 – Nellie Briercliffe, singer and actress with the D'Oyly Carte company, 77
- December 14 – Shailendra, lyricist, 43
- December 24 – Gaspar Cassadó, cellist and composer, 69

== Awards ==
=== Grammy Awards ===
- Grammy Awards of 1966

=== Eurovision Song Contest ===
- Eurovision Song Contest 1966

=== Leeds International Piano Competition ===
- Rafael Orozco

=== Van Cliburn International Piano Competition ===
- Radu Lupu

== See also ==
- Hot 100 No. 1 Hits of 1966
