= My Favorite Guitars =

My Favorite Guitars may refer to:

- My Favorite Guitars (Chet Atkins album), 1964
- My Favorite Guitars (Andreas Oberg album), 2008
