= Guitar Country =

Studio album by Chet Atkins
- Released: 1964
- Recorded: RCA 'Nashville Sound' Studios, Nashville, TN
- Genre: Country
- Length: 27:49
- Label: RCA Victor LPM 2783 (mono), LSP 2783 (Stereo)
- Producer: Bob Ferguson

Chet Atkins chronology
Reminiscing (1964)	Guitar Country (1964)	Progressive Pickin' (1964)

Guitar Country is the twenty-fourth studio album by American guitarist Chet Atkins. The album was a nominee for the 1964 Best Country & Western Album Grammy award, however it was beat out by Roger Miller's "Dang Me/ Chug-A-Lug". The album stayed on the Top Country LP's charts for 33 weeks, peaking at No. 1 in May 1964. Prior to 1964, there was no separate genre chart for Country LPs; thus, Chet's previous charting albums were on the Pop charts. Numerous future Atkins releases "crossed over" from the Country and Pop charts. The album reached No. 64 on the Billboard pop Top LP's chart in the US.

Professional ratings
Review scores
Source	Rating
Allmusic	4/5 stars

== Reissues ==
- Guitar Country and More of That Guitar Country were reissued together on CD in 2001 on the Collectibles label.

== Track listing ==
=== Side one ===
1. "Freight Train" (Elizabeth Cotten) – 2:03
2. "A Little Bit of Blues" (Jerry Reed) – 2:58
3. "Nine Pound Hammer" (Merle Travis) – 2:26
4. "Dobro" (Atkins, Cy Coben) – 1:59
5. "Kentucky" (Karl Davis) – 2:53
6. "Vaya con Dios" (Larry Russell, Inez James, Buddy Pepper) – 2:23

=== Side two ===
1. "Winter Walkin'" (Jerry Reed) – 2:01
2. "Guitar Country" (Johnny Mercer, Willard Robison) – 2:39
3. "Sugarfoot Rag" (Hank Garland, Vaughn Horton) – 2:01
4. "Gone" (Smokey Rogers) – 2:01
5. "Copper Kettle" (Albert F. Beddoe) – 2:10
6. "Yes Ma'am" (Jerry Reed) – 2:15

== Personnel ==
- Chet Atkins – Guitar
- Ray Edenton – Rhythm guitar
- Henry Strzelecki – Bass
- Bill Pursell – Piano (Yes Ma'am)
- Floyd Cramer – Electric piano
- Jim Carney – Drums

== Production notes ==
- Bob Ferguson – Producer
- Bill Porter – Recording engineer

== Charts ==
Chart peaks for Guitar Country
Chart (1964)	Peak position
US Billboard Top Country LP's	1
US Billboard Top LP's	64
