= Reminiscing (Chet Atkins and Hank Snow album) =

Studio album by Chet Atkins and Hank Snow
- Released: August 1964
- Recorded: RCA Victor 'Nashville Sound' Studios, Nashville, TN
- Genre: Country
- Length: 31:42
- Labels: RCA Victor LPM 2952 (Mono), LSP-2952 (Stereo)
- Producers: Chet Atkins and Bob Ferguson

Chet Atkins chronology
Travelin' (1963)	Reminiscing (1964)	Guitar Country (1964)

Chet Atkins Collaborations chronology
Reminiscing (1964)	The Pops Goes Country (1966)

Reminiscing is the first collaborative long-play recording by American country music artists Chet Atkins and Hank Snow, released in 1964.

== History ==
The liner notes, titled "Guitar Duets by a Pair of Favorites", are by Chris Lane, a program director from KAYO radio in Seattle, Washington, who takes credit for recommending the collaboration to RCA.

Snow and Atkins had been doing guitar duets on various radio stations, gathering listeners and fans. Their first single was "Reminiscing", produced roughly seven years before the release of this LP. Atkins and Snow had a hit single in 1955, a guitar duet called "Silver Bell." A regular at the Grand Ole Opry, Snow was a Hall of Fame country music singer and songwriter. He had a career covering six decades during which he sold more than 80 million albums. Atkins had not only made his mark as a sideman and recording artist on his own, but was also busy producing many major country artists and developing Nashville as a major center for country music recording.

Atkins and Snow joined forces again in 1969 to record C.B. Atkins & C.E. Snow by Special Request. Both albums are out of print and have not been reissued on CD.

Professional ratings
Review scores
Source	Rating
Allmusic	3/5 stars

== Track listing ==
=== Side one ===
1. "Indian Love Call" (Rudolf Friml, Oscar Hammerstein, Otto Harbach) – 3:20
2. "I Can't Stop Loving You" (Don Gibson) – 2:26
3. "Beautiful Dreamer" (Traditional) – 2:54
4. "Vaya con Dios" (Larry Russell, Inez James, Buddy Pepper) – 2:54
5. "Sonny Boy" (Al Jolson, Buddy DeSylva, Lew Brown, Ray Henderson) – 3:01
6. "The Convict and the Rose" (Robert King, Ballard MacDonald) – 2:20

=== Side two ===
1. "Brahms' Lullaby" (Johannes Brahms)– 2:14
2. "My Isle of Golden Dreams" (Walter Blaufuss, Gus Kahn) – 2:25
3. "Blue Tango" (Leroy Anderson) – 2:16
4. "Unchained Melody" (Alex North, Hy Zaret) – 2:55
5. "In an Old Dutch Garden (By an Old Dutch Mill)" (Mack Gordon, Will Grosz) – 2:12
6. "Dark Moon" (Ned Miller) – 2:35

== Personnel ==
- Chet Atkins – guitar, vocals
- Hank Snow – guitar, vocals
- Marvin Huges – piano
- Chubby Wise – fiddle
- Ray Edenton – guitar
- Jim Carney – drums
- Bill McElhiney – trumpet
- Bob Moore – bass

== Production notes ==
- Engineered by Chuck Seitz
- Arrangements by Anita Kerr
- Cover photo by Sid O'Berry

== See also ==
- The Nashville A-Team
