= Born Free (Andy Williams album) =

Studio album by Andy Williams
- Released: April 10, 1967
- Recorded: 1967
- Genres: AM pop; traditional pop; vocal pop; film music; soundtracks
- Length: 33:39
- Labels: Columbia; Stereo CS 9480; Mono CL 2680
- Producer: Nick DeCaro

Andy Williams chronology
In the Arms of Love (1966)	Born Free (1967)	Love, Andy (1967)

Collectables reissue
- Born Free portion of cover

Singles from Born Free
- 1. "Music to Watch Girls By" Released: March 2, 1967

Born Free is the twentieth studio album by American pop singer Andy Williams and was released on April 10, 1967, by Columbia Records and includes half a dozen songs associated with movies or musicals. Two of these tracks, however, originated in the scores of the films indicated on the album jacket but had lyrics added later: the melody for "Strangers in the Night" was written for A Man Could Get Killed, and "Somewhere My Love" began as "Lara's Theme" from Doctor Zhivago.

The album debuted on Billboard's Top LP's chart in the issue dated May 13, 1967, and remained there for 79 weeks, peaking at number five. It debuted on the Cashbox albums chart in the issue dated May 6, 1967, and remained on the chart for in a total of 31 weeks, peaking at number six. The album received a Gold certification from the RIAA on July 6, 1967, and that same month it began 11 weeks on the UK album chart, where it reached number 22.

The single from the album, "Music to Watch Girls By", was available two months before the album was released and first appeared on the Billboard Hot 100 chart in the issue of the magazine dated March 25, and peaking at number 34 over the course of eight weeks. On the Easy Listening chart, it debuted in the issue dated April 1 and peaked at number two during a 13-week stay. and number 50 on the Cashbox singles chart during its seven weeks there. It debuted on the UK charts shortly thereafter, on May 6, and stayed around for six weeks, peaking at number 33. The song was reissued there in 1999 and spent another six weeks on the chart, this time reaching number nine.

The album was released on compact disc as one of two albums on one CD by Collectables Records on March 23, 1999, consisting of Williams's 1967 Columbia release, Love, Andy. It was also released as one of two albums on one CD by Sony Music Distribution on May 14, 2001, paired this time with Williams's Columbia album from 1966, In the Arms of Love. The original album covers are displayed side by side on the front of these CD reissues, and it is clear that the color of the Born Free cover has been enhanced considerably for the Collectables release, as Williams's suntanned face from the original LP cover shown on the Sony release now has a more psychedelic orange glow. Born Free was included in a box set entitled Classic Album Collection, Vol. 1, which contains 17 of his studio albums and three compilations and was released on June 26, 2001.

== Reception ==
Professional ratings
Review scores
Source	Rating
AllMusic	4/5 stars
The Encyclopedia of Popular Music	4/5 stars
Record Mirror	4/5 stars

William Ruhlmann of AllMusic remarked that this album "marked a notable contemporization of the Williams formula. On his most recent albums, The Shadow of Your Smile and In the Arms of Love, he had leaned toward Brazilian sounds, recording more obscure material and several standards from the interwar period." He also explained why the change may have happened: "In the Arms of Love, released only four months before Born Free, had sold disappointingly. Williams reacted by dropping the bossa nova and the oldies and looked more to the recent pop charts for covers like Bobby Hebb's 'Sunny.'" Ruhlmann suggested that Williams was trying to reach as wide of an audience as possible. "At a time when non-rock pop singers were beginning to be marginalized, Williams successfully threaded the needle, reassuring his older listeners while proving adaptable to current trends."

Billboard Magazine noted that Williams sings "blockbusting film tunes…in his usual cool, relaxed style".

Cashbox said that Williams "performs with his characteristic smoothness and mellowness".Record World referred to it as a "big package"

Variety noted that "Williams performs [the title song] with great finesse as part of a program of other film and show tunes plus some recent hits."

Record Mirror called it "an exquisite album", and noted that "his version of 'Then You Can Tell Me Goodbye' is tender, while his "Strangers In The Night" is somewhat drier than Sinatra's".

The critics of Record Mirror, AllMusic, and The Encyclopedia of Popular Music each gave the album a four-star rating.

== Track listing ==
=== Side one ===
1. "Born Free" from Born Free (Don Black, John Barry) – 2:27
2. "Somewhere My Love" from Doctor Zhivago (Paul Francis Webster, Maurice Jarre) – 2:38
3. "Spanish Eyes" (Charlie Singleton, Eddie Snyder, Bert Kaempfert) – 3:04
4. "Strangers in the Night" from A Man Could Get Killed (Charlie Singleton, Eddie Snyder, Bert Kaempfert) – 2:32
5. "Sherry!" from Sherry! (James Lipton, Laurence Rosenthal) – 2:27
6. "Music to Watch Girls By" (Tony Velona, Sid Ramin) – 2:38

=== Side two ===
1. "I Want to Be Free" (Tommy Boyce, Bobby Hart) – 3:20
2. "Alfie" from Alfie (Hal David, Burt Bacharach) – 2:55
3. "Then You Can Tell Me Goodbye " (John D. Loudermilk) – 2:37
4. "Sunny" (Bobby Hebb) – 3:16
5. "I Will Wait for You" from The Umbrellas of Cherbourg (Jacques Demy, Norman Gimbel, Michel Legrand) – 2:42
6. "You Are Where Everything Is" (Nick DeCaro) – 3:06

== Charts ==
Chart peaks for Born Free
Chart (1967)	Peak position
US Top LPs (Billboard)	5
US Cashbox Top 100 Albums	6
UK Record Retailer Albums Chart	22

=== Singles ===
Title	Year	U.S. Hot 100	U.S. Cashbox	U.S. AC	UK singles
"Music to Watch Girls By"	1967	34	50	2	19
"Music to Watch Girls By"	1999	—	—	—	9

== Personnel ==
This was Williams's 13th studio album for Columbia Records and the first of those that was not produced by Robert Mersey. The credits are from the liner notes for the original album:

- Andy Williams – vocals
- Nick DeCaro - arranger (except as noted), producer
- J. Hill - arranger ("Strangers in the Night", "I Will Wait for You")
- Eddie Karam - arranger (" Spanish Eyes", "Sherry!")
- Ray Gerhardt - recording engineer
- Bob Cato - photography

== Bibliography ==
- Whitburn, Joel (1993), Joel Whitburn's Top Adult Contemporary, 1961–1993, Record Research Inc., ISBN 0-89820-099-7
- Whitburn, Joel (1999), Joel Whitburn's Top Pop Singles, 1955–1999, Record Research Inc., ISBN 0-89820-140-3
- Larkin, Colin (2007), The Encyclopedia of Popular Music, Omnibus Press, ISBN 9-7818-4609-8567
- Whitburn, Joel (2010), Joel Whitburn Presents Top Pop Albums, Seventh Edition, Record Research Inc., ISBN 0-89820-183-7
