= Progressive Pickin' =

Studio album by Chet Atkins
- Released: 1964
- Recorded: 1964 in Nashville, TN
- Genre: Country, pop
- Length: 30:38
- Label: RCA Victor LSP-2908 (Stereo)
- Producer: Bob Ferguson

Chet Atkins chronology
Guitar Country (1964)	Progressive Pickin' (1964)	The Best of Chet Atkins (1964)

Progressive Pickin' is the twenty-fifth studio album by guitarist Chet Atkins.

Professional ratings
Review scores
Source	Rating
Allmusic	3/5 stars
Record Mirror	4/5 stars

== Track listing ==
=== Side one ===
1. "Gravy Waltz" (Steve Allen, Ray Brown) – 3:04
2. "Love Letters" (Edward Heyman, Victor Young) – 2:30
3. "Early Times" (Jerry Reed) – 2:37
4. "Satan's Doll" (Johnny Smith) – 3:50
5. "Summertime" (George Gershwin, Ira Gershwin, Heyward) – 2:57

=== Side two ===
1. "Kicky" (Jerry Reed) – 2:18
2. "Jordu" (Duke Jordan) – 3:15
3. "I Remember You" (Johnny Mercer, Victor Schertzinger) – 3:35
4. "Bluesette" (Toots Thielemans) – 3:15
5. "So Rare" (Jerry Herst, Jack Sharpe) – 3:02

== Personnel ==
- Chet Atkins – guitar
- Henry Strzelecki – bass
- Bill Pursell – piano
- Buddy Harman – drums
- Chuck Seitz – recording engineer
