= The Best of Chet Atkins =

Greatest hits album by Chet Atkins
- Released: 1964
- Recorded: Nashville, TN
- Genres: Country, pop
- Label: RCA Victor

Chet Atkins chronology
Progressive Pickin' (1964)	The Best of Chet Atkins (1964)	My Favorite Guitars (1964)

The Best of Chet Atkins is a compilation recording by American guitarist Chet Atkins, released in 1964.

== History ==
The original LP release included 12 tracks which have been increased on the 1980 reissue to include four additional songs: "Teensville", "Boo Boo Stick Beat", "One Mint Julep", and "Yakety Axe". Apart from those titles, the track listing is the same as the original LP.

The collection is notable in that it is Atkins' first "Best of..." release, but does not include some of his highest charting singles up to that time.

The mono tracks were treated with "phoney stereo" in the original stereo version.

This title has been discontinued. All the songs are available on other compilation packages and Chet Atkins retrospectives. There have been many CD releases of various Atkins selections that are titled "The Best of Chet Atkins".

Professional ratings
Review scores
Source	Rating
Allmusic	4.5/5 stars
Record Mirror	4/5 stars

== Track listing ==
1. "Teensville" (Wayne Cogswell)
2. "Boo Boo Stick Beat" (Buddy Harman, John D. Loudermilk)
3. "One Mint Julep" (Rudy Toombs)
4. "Jitterbug Waltz" (Maltby, Fats Waller)
5. "Peanut Vendor" (Moisés Simmons)
6. "Django's Castle" (Django Reinhardt)
7. "Blue Ocean Echo" (Chet Atkins, Boudleaux Bryant)
8. "Yankee Doodle Dixie" (Atkins)
9. "Swedish Rhapsody" (Hugo Alfvén)
10. "Vanessa" (Wayne)
11. "Trambone" (Atkins)
12. "Malaguena" (Ernesto Lecuona)
13. "Meet Mister Callaghan" (Eric Spear)
14. "Main Street Breakdown" (Atkins)
15. "Country Gentleman" (Chet Atkins, Boudleaux Bryant)
16. "Yakety Axe" (Boots Randolph, Rich)

== Personnel ==
- Chet Atkins – guitar
