= In the Arms of Love =

- Japanese release picture sleeve

Single by Andy Williams

from the album In the Arms of Love
- B-side: "The Many Faces of Love"
- Released: August 1966
- Genre: Vocal
- Length: 2:53
- Label: Columbia Records 43737
- Songwriter(s): Henry Mancini, Jay Livingston, Ray Evans
- Producer(s): Robert Mersey

Andy Williams singles chronology
"How Can I Tell Her It's Over" (1966)	"In the Arms of Love" (1966)	"Music to Watch Girls By" (1967)

"In the Arms of Love" is a song featured in the 1966 film, What Did You Do in the War, Daddy? The song's music was composed by Henry Mancini with lyrics by Jay Livingston and Ray Evans and was performed by Andy Williams. "In the Arms of Love" peaked at #49 on the Billboard Hot 100 and was Williams' second of four number ones on the Easy Listening chart, where it stayed at the top for two weeks in October 1966. The song also reached #33 in the UK.

== See also ==
- List of number-one adult contemporary singles of 1966 (U.S.)
