= In the Arms of Love (album) =

Studio album by Andy Williams
- Released: December 19, 1966
- Recorded: 1966
- Genre: AM pop; traditional pop; vocal pop
- Length: 31:13
- Label: Columbia
- Producer: Robert Mersey

Andy Williams chronology
The Shadow of Your Smile (1966)	In the Arms of Love (1966)	Born Free (1967)

In the Arms of Love is the nineteenth studio album by American pop singer Andy Williams and was released on December 19, 1966, by Columbia Records and was the last of twelve consecutive Williams studio LPs produced by Robert Mersey.

The album made its first appearance on Billboard magazine's Top LP's chart in the issue dated January 21, 1967, and remained on the album chart for 22 weeks, peaking at number 21. it also debuted on the Cashbox albums chart in the issue dated January 7, 1967, and remained on the chart for 21 weeks, peaking at number 15

The title song from the album was released as a single in July 1966, one month before the release of the film What Did You Do in the War, Daddy?, the soundtrack of which is performed by the song's composer, Henry Mancini, and includes instrumental and vocal versions of the song. The film opened on August 31, 1966, and Williams' version of "In the Arms of Love" first appeared on the Billboard Hot 100 in the issue of the magazine dated August 27, eventually reaching number 49 over the course of eight weeks. The song performed even better on the Easy Listening chart after debuting in the issue dated July 30 and spending two weeks at number one during a 17-week stay. It began its chart run in the UK shortly thereafter, on September 24, and stayed around for seven weeks, peaking at number 33.

The album was released on compact disc as one of two albums on one CD by Collectables Records on January 16, 2001, along with Williams's 1963 Columbia album, Days of Wine and Roses and Other TV Requests. It was also released as one of two albums on one CD by Sony Music Distribution on May 14, 2001, paired this time with Williams's 1967 Columbia album, Born Free. In the Arms of Love was included in a box set entitled Classic Album Collection, Vol. 1, which contains 17 of his studio albums and three compilations and was released on June 26, 2001.

== Reception ==
Professional ratings
Review scores
Source	Rating
AllMusic	3/5 stars
The Encyclopedia of Popular Music	3/5 stars
Record Mirror	4/5 stars

Writing for AllMusic, critic William Ruhlmann theorized as to the why this album ended the string of "six consecutive Gold-selling Top Ten albums (not counting reissues and compilations" or Christmas LPs) that Williams was enjoying upon its release, offering that it "may just be a question of marketing. The album, with its austere black cover, was released late in the holiday season after Williams's summer single 'In the Arms of Love,' belatedly topped the Easy Listening chart in October. The song was written by Henry Mancini, who had meant dollar signs for Williams with such previous movie themes as 'Moon River,' 'Days of Wine and Roses,' and 'Dear Heart.' But this hit, which only made it halfway up the pop charts, came from an unsuccessful film, What Did You Do in the War, Daddy?, and mid-December was no time to start selling a new, non-seasonal release." As to the quality of the album itself, he wrote, "Much of it is even calmer than usual for him, and the focus on foreign material makes you wish he'd just gone ahead and recorded a samba album or one made up entirely of international songs, since those tunes mix oddly with the choices from the Great American Songbook and recent film themes. Williams had indicated his interest in overseas material on his last album, The Shadow of Your Smile, but this one went even further, though without the quality of songs to sustain the direction."

Billboard described the album as "one of [Williams] best albums."

Cashbox gave a positive review, saying the album "devoted exlusively [sic] to love ballads"

Variety noted that Williams "does exceptionally well on "'The Very Thought of You', 'And We Were Lovers', 'Remember', 'In The Arms of Love', 'So Nice', 'Pretty Butterfly', 'A Man and A Woman', and 'All Through The Night"

Record Mirror described the album as "a very gentle album"

== Track listing ==
=== Side one ===
1. "The Very Thought of You" (Ray Noble) – 2:42
2. "If I Love Again" (Jack Murray, Ben Oakland) – 2:33
3. "Theme from The Sand Pebbles (And We Were Lovers)" from The Sand Pebbles (Leslie Bricusse, Jerry Goldsmith) – 2:50
4. "Remember" (Irving Berlin) – 2:48
5. "Here's That Rainy Day" from Carnival in Flanders (Johnny Burke, Jimmy Van Heusen) – 2:43
6. "In the Arms of Love" from What Did You Do in the War, Daddy? (Ray Evans, Jay Livingston, Henry Mancini) – 2:56

=== Side two ===
1. "The Face I Love" (Ray Gilbert, Carlos Pingarilho, Marcos Valle, Paulo Sérgio Valle) – 2:03
2. "Sand and Sea" (Gilbert Bécaud, Mack David, Mike Vidalin) – 2:48
3. "So Nice (Summer Samba) " (Norman Gimbel, Marcos Valle, Paulo Sérgio Valle) – 2:37
4. "Pretty Butterfly" (Mario Albanese, Loryn Deane, Ciro Pereira, Sunny Skylar) – 2:16
5. "A Man and a Woman" from A Man and a Woman (Pierre Barouh, Jerry Keller, Francis Lai) – 2:50
6. "All Through the Night" from Anything Goes (Cole Porter) – 2:09

== Charts ==
Chart (1967)	Peak position
US Top LPs (Billboard)	21
US Cashbox	15

== Personnel ==
From the liner notes for the original album:

- Andy Williams – vocals
- Robert Mersey - arranger/conductor ("Here's That Rainy Day", "In the Arms of Love"), arranger ("A Man and a Woman"), conductor ("Remember", "All Through the Night"), producer
- Dick Hazard - arranger ("The Very Thought of You", "If I Love Again", "Theme from The Sand Pebbles (And We Were Lovers)", "Remember", "The Face I Love", "Sand and Sea", "So Nice (Summer Samba)")
- Allyn Ferguson - arranger ("Pretty Butterfly")
- Dave Grusin - arranger ("All Through the Night")
- Bob Cato - photography

== Bibliography ==
- Whitburn, Joel (2010), Joel Whitburn Presents Top Pop Albums, Seventh Edition, Record Research Inc., ISBN 0-89820-183-7
- Whitburn, Joel (1986), Joel Whitburn's Pop Memories, 1890-1954, Record Research Inc., ISBN 0-89820-083-0
- Whitburn, Joel (1993), Joel Whitburn's Top Adult Contemporary, 1961-1993, Record Research Inc., ISBN 0-89820-099-7
- Whitburn, Joel (1999), Joel Whitburn's Top Pop Singles, 1955-1999, Record Research Inc., ISBN 0-89820-140-3
