= The Pops Goes Country =

Studio album by Chet Atkins and Arthur Fiedler
- Released: 1966
- Recorded: 1966
- Genre: Country, pop
- Label: RCA Victor Red Seal
- Producer: Peter Dellheim

Chet Atkins chronology
The Best of Chet Atkins, Vol. 2 (1966)	The Pops Goes Country (1966)	Music from Nashville, My Home Town (1966)

Chet Atkins Collaborations chronology
Reminiscing (1964)	The Pops Goes Country (1966)	The Nashville String Band (1969)

The Pops Goes Country is the title of the first collaborative recording by guitarist Chet Atkins and Arthur Fiedler with the Boston Pops Orchestra. The arrangements were done by Richard Hayman.

Professional ratings
Review scores
Source	Rating
Allmusic	2.5/5 stars

== Track listing ==
=== Side one ===
1. "Country Gentleman" (Atkins, Boudleaux Bryant)
2. "Tennessee Waltz" (Pee Wee King)
3. "Alabama Jubilee" (Jack Yellen, George L. Cobb)
4. "Faded Love" (Bob Wills, Johnnie Lee Wills)
5. "In the Pines/Wildwood Flower/On Top of Old Smokey" (Traditional)
6. "Windy and Warm" (John D. Loudermilk)

=== Side two ===
1. "I'll Fly Away" (Albert E. Brumley)
2. "Adios Amigo" (Jay Livingston, Ralph Freed)
3. "John Henry/Listen to the Mocking Bird" (Traditional)
4. "Cold, Cold Heart" (Hank Williams)
5. "I'm Thinking Tonight of My Blue Eyes" (A. P. Carter)
6. "Orange Blossom Special" (Ervin T. Rouse)

== Personnel ==
- Chet Atkins – guitar
- Henry Strzelecki - bass
- John Greubel - drums
- The Boston Pops Orchestra - orchestra
- Richard Hayman - arranger
- Arthur Fiedler - conductor
