= How Can I Tell Her It's Over =

- Japanese release picture sleeve

Single by Andy Williams
- B-side: "Summer of Our Love"
- Released: June 1966
- Genre: Vocal
- Length: 2:38
- Label: Columbia Records 43650
- Songwriter(s): Barry Mann, Cynthia Weil
- Producer(s): Robert Mersey

Andy Williams singles chronology
"Bye Bye Blues" (1966)	"How Can I Tell Her It's Over" (1966)	"In the Arms of Love" (1966)

"How Can I Tell Her It's Over" is a song written by Barry Mann and Cynthia Weil and performed by Andy Williams. The song reached number 17 on the adult contemporary chart and number 109 on the Billboard Hot 100 in 1966.
