= The Best of Chet Atkins, Vol. 2 =

Compilation album by Chet Atkins
- Released: 1966
- Recorded: Nashville, TN
- Genre: Country, pop
- Length: 28:01
- Label: RCA Victor

Chet Atkins chronology
From Nashville with Love (1966)	The Best of Chet Atkins, Vol. 2 (1966)	The Pops Goes Country (1966)

Professional ratings
Review scores
Source	Rating
Allmusic	(no rating) link

The Best of Chet Atkins, Vol. 2 is a compilation recording by American guitarist Chet Atkins.

This title has been discontinued. All the songs are available on other compilation packages and Chet Atkins retrospectives.

== Track listing ==
1. "Yakety Axe" (Boots Randolph, James Rich) – 2:00
2. "Limelight" – 3:08
3. "Josephine" (Burke Bivens, Gus Kahn, Wayne King) – 2:03
4. "Alley Cat" (Bent Fabric) – 2:17
5. "Que Sera, Sera (Whatever Will Be, Will Be)" (Livingston, Evans) – 2:14
6. "White Silver Sands" (Charles "Red" Matthews) – 2:14
7. "Oh Lonesome Me" (Don Gibson) – 2:17
8. "Never on Sunday" (Manos Hadjidakis, Billy Towne) – 3:02
9. "Give the World a Smile" (Otis Deaton, M. L. Yandell) – 2:04
10. "Freight Train" (James, Williams) – 2:00
11. "Cloudy and Cool" (John D. Loudermilk) - 2:14
12. "Wheels" (Norman Petty) – 2:28

== Personnel ==
- Chet Atkins – guitar
