= What Did You Do in the War, Daddy? =

1966 film by Blake Edwards

- Theatrical release poster
- Directed by: Blake Edwards
- Screenplay by: William Peter Blatty
- Story by: Maurice Richlin; Blake Edwards
- Produced by: Blake Edwards
- Starring: James Coburn; Dick Shawn; Sergio Fantoni; Giovanna Ralli; Aldo Ray; Carroll O'Connor; Harry Morgan
- Cinematography: Philip H. Lathrop
- Edited by: Ralph E. Winters
- Music by: Ray Evans; Jay Livingston; Henry Mancini
- Production company: The Mirisch Company
- Distributed by: United Artists
- Release date: August 31, 1966
- Running time: 116 minutes
- Country: United States
- Languages: English; Italian; German
- Budget: $7,000,000 USD
- Box office: $2,650,000 (est. US/ Canada rentals)

What Did You Do in the War, Daddy? is a 1966 comedy DeLuxe Color film written by William Peter Blatty and directed by Blake Edwards for The Mirisch Company in Panavision. It stars James Coburn and Dick Shawn.

== Plot ==
During the Allied invasion of Sicily, an outfit of U.S. soldiers is assigned to capture the small town of Valerno, but upon arrival, they discover that the Italian Army garrison led by Captain Fausto Oppo have been expecting them. They will willingly surrender, provided they are permitted to complete a soccer match and a wine festival.

Romance and frivolity ensue, as a reluctant, by-the-book Capt. Lionel Cash is persuaded by easy-going Lt. Jody Christian to go along with the locals' wishes. Christian convinces Cash to send a message to headquarters that they have encountered resistance. During an aerial reconnaissance of the town, the Germans mistake the festival for an attack. A nearby German Panzer unit is ordered to come to the Italians' aid, but the Americans accidentally end up conquering all.

== Cast ==
- James Coburn as Lieutenant Jody Christian
- Dick Shawn as Captain Lionel Cash
- Sergio Fantoni as Captain Fausto Oppo
- Giovanna Ralli as Gina Romano
- Aldo Ray as Sergeant Rizzo
- Harry Morgan as Major Pott
- Carroll O'Connor as General Max Bolt
- Leon Askin as Colonel Kastorp
- Henry Rico Cattani as Benedetto
- Jay Novello as Mayor Giuseppe Romano
- Ralph Manza as Waiter
- Vito Scotti as Frederico
- Johnny Seven as Vittorio
- Art Lewis as Needleman
- William Bryant as Minow
- Kurt Kreuger as German Captain

== Production ==
The title of the film came to Blake Edwards when he was asked the question by his son Geoffrey.

The film was the first of what was originally intended to be six Mirisch-Geoffrey Productions between Edwards and The Mirisch Company. Edwards was paid $375,000 as producer-director plus 20% of the gross over a certain amount, and a writers' fee when applicable. Edwards and William Peter Blatty had been working on What Did You Do in the War Daddy? after The Pink Panther but stopped it to make A Shot in the Dark and The Great Race. Edwards then decided to reactivate the property. According to Edwards, this was Walter Mirisch's idea - "I told him that I didn’t think it was a good time to do a war comedy — it was right in the middle of the Vietnam War, there were a lot of Gold Star mothers and the perspective on war was not what it should be for this kind of satire."

James Coburn signed in May 1965. He had just made Our Man Flint. Dick Shawn, who signed soon afterwards, had just been in It's a Mad Mad Mad Mad World.

Walter Mirisch says in his memoirs that Edwards was enthusiastic about the film. He said stars James Coburn and Dick Shawn were "hardly big comedic box-office attractions. They were fashionable, but not the personalities who would promise an audience a big comedic romp. I think its casting certainly affected its grossing potential. Unfortunately, it also went considerably over budget."

As Edwards was having marital problems at the time with his then-wife Patricia Walker, he did not want to leave the United States, so Mirisch Productions agreed to film the movie in Lake Sherwood, California, for $5 million that included the construction of a large Italian village set. In his study of Edwards, Myron Meisel stated that Coburn imitated Blake Edwards' mannerisms throughout the film.

William Peter Blatty recalled that Edwards and he originally agreed to make the film grim and without comedy for the first 20 minutes. This idea was shelved when, during the scene where Captain Lionel Cash (Shawn) visits Charlie Company at their chow line, he holds out his hand and one of the GI mess orderlies ladles beans into the captain's hand.

== Reception ==
The film grossed $2,650,000 at the box office.

On review aggregator Rotten Tomatoes, the film has an approval rating of 50% based on 12 reviews, with an average score of 5.80/10.

FilmInk argued "Maybe 1966 was too early for this sort of anti-war comedy – a few more years in the Vietnam quagmire might’ve made audiences more receptive. The film has a big cult, though." In 2008, Dave Kehr of The New York Times wrote of the film: "this 1966 antiwar farce, made as things were heating up in Vietnam, is one of the most ingeniously constructed American comedies, a brilliantly sustained series of plot reversals, inverted identities and reconfigured values...", praising Dick Shawn's performance as "his most significant movie role... [who] undergoes the painfully funny process of self-discovery through which so many of Mr. Edwards’s heroes must pass frequently in women’s clothing, most famously in “10” (1979) and “Victor/Victoria” (1982)."

== Music ==
The score is by Henry Mancini. It includes "The Swing March" and "In the Arms of Love".
