= More of That Guitar Country =

Studio album by Chet Atkins
- Released: 1965
- Recorded: RCA "Nashville Sound" Studio, Nashville, TN
- Genre: Country, country-pop, Nashville sound
- Length: 27:22
- Label: RCA Victor
- Producer: Bob Ferguson

Chet Atkins chronology
| My Favorite Guitars (1964) | More of That Guitar Country (1965) | Chet Atkins Picks on the Beatles (1966) |

More of That Guitar Country is the twenty-seventh studio album by US country musician Chet Atkins. It is a follow-up to his Guitar Country release and was more successful. His rendition of "Yakety Sax" by Boots Randolph earned Atkins a hit on the country singles charts. A mix of traditional fingerpicking, country-flavored pop and traditional country, the album peaked at number 4 on the Billboard Country charts.

More of That Guitar Country and "Yakety Axe" were nominated for four 1965 Grammy awards but did not win any.

== Reception ==
Professional ratings
Review scores
| Source | Rating |
|---|---|
| Allmusic | 4/5 stars |

In an Allmusic review, critic Richard S. Ginell wrote of the album "... one of Atkins' least-cluttered, mostly reined-in, and most musical albums of the mid-'60s, searching for good material wherever he can find it, even outside the cloistered world of Nashville."

== Reissues ==
- More of That Guitar Country and Guitar Country were reissued together on CD in 2001 on the Collectibles label.

== Track listing ==
=== Side one ===
1. "Yakety Axe" (Boots Randolph, James Rich) – 2:04
2. "Back Up and Push" (Traditional; arranged by Chet Atkins) – 2:13
3. "Cloudy and Cool" (John D. Loudermilk) – 2:19
4. "Alone and Forsaken" (Hank Williams) – 2:41
5. "Old Joe Clark" (Traditional; arranged by Chet Atkins) – 2:08
6. "Catch the Wind" (Donovan) – 2:03

=== Side two ===
1. "How's the World Treating You" (Atkins, Boudleaux Bryant) – 2:39
2. "Understand Your Man" (Johnny Cash) – 2:02
3. "Letter Edged in Black" (Traditional) – 2:06
4. "My Town" (Atkins) – 2:20
5. "Blowin' in the Wind" (Bob Dylan) – 2:24
6. "The Last Letter" (Rex Griffin) – 2:23

== Personnel ==
- Chet Atkins – guitar
- Jerry Smith – piano
- Charlie McCoy – harmonica

== Production ==
- Engineered by Al Pachucki and Chuck Seitz
