= The Best of Dean Martin =

Greatest hits album by Dean Martin
- Released: October 3, 1966
- Recorded: 1951–1960
- Genre: Pop
- Length: 33:27
- Label: Capitol

Dean Martin compilation album chronology
Happy in Love (1966)	The Best of Dean Martin (1966)	You Can't Love 'Em All (1967)

Professional ratings
Review scores
Source	Rating
Allmusic	4.5/5 stars

The Best of Dean Martin is a 1966 compilation album of Dean Martin songs, released by Capitol Records.

== Track listing ==
The following are the tracks on the album:

1. "That's Amore" (Harry Warren, Jack Brooks) – 3:07
2. "You're Nobody till Somebody Loves You" (Russ Morgan, Larry Stock, James Cavanaugh) – 2:13
3. "Volare" (Domenico Modugno, Franco Migliacci, Mitchell Parish) – 3:00
4. "It's Easy to Remember (And So Hard to Forget)" (Richard Rodgers, Lorenz Hart) – 3:16
5. "Sway" (Pablo Beltrán Ruiz, Norman Gimbel) – 2:43
6. "Return to Me" (Carmen Lombardo, Danny Di Minno) – 2:25
7. "Memories Are Made of This" (Terry Gilkyson, Richard Dehr, Frank Miller) – 2:17
8. "June in January" (Ralph Rainger, Leo Robin) – 2:49
9. "Come Back to Sorrento (Torna a Surriento)" (Ernesto De Curtis, Claude Aveling) – 3:14
10. "Just in Time" (Jule Styne, Betty Comden, Adolph Green) – 2:14
11. "I'm Yours" (Johnny Green, E. Y. Harburg) – 3:16
12. "Hey, Brother, Pour the Wine" (Ross Bagdasarian, Sr.) – 2:53
