= From Nashville with Love =

Studio album by Chet Atkins
- Released: 1966
- Recorded: RCA 'Nashville Sound' Studios, Nashville, TN
- Genre: Country, pop
- Label: RCA Victor LSP-3647 (Stereo)
- Producer: Chet Atkins, Anita Kerr, Bob Ferguson

Chet Atkins chronology
Chet Atkins Picks on the Beatles (1966)	From Nashville with Love (1966)	The Best of Chet Atkins, Vol. 2 (1966)

From Nashville with Love is the twenty-ninth studio album by American guitarist Chet Atkins, released in 1966.

The album peaked at No. 26 on the Billboard country albums chart and at No. 140 on Billboard pop albums.

Professional ratings
Review scores
Source	Rating
Allmusic	2.5/5 stars

== Track listing ==
=== Side one ===
1. "La Fiesta" (Byron Williams)
2. "Song from Moulin Rouge (Where Is Your Heart?)" (William Engvick, George Auric, Augene Ageron)
3. "Something Tender" (George Barnes)
4. "Romance"
5. "Drina" (Stanislav Binički)
6. "Al Di La" (Carlo Donida, Mogol)

=== Side two ===
1. "From Nashville with Love" (John D. Loudermilk)
2. "English Leather" (Jerry Hubbard)
3. "After the Tears" (Atkins, Shirley Nagel)
4. "Stranger on the Shore" (Acker Bilk, Robert Mellin)
5. "Soul Journey" (Atkins, Tim Spencer)
6. "I Love Paris" (Cole Porter)

== Personnel ==
- Chet Atkins – guitar
- William K. McElhiney – arranger
- Chuck Seitz, Jim Malloy – engineer

== Charts ==
Chart (1966)	Peak position
US Billboard Top LPs	140
US Billboard Top Country LPs	26
