= La Cenicienta =

1966 opera composed by Jorge Peña Hen

La Cenicienta (Cinderella) is a children's opera in three acts composed by Chilean artist Jorge Peña Hen (1928–1973), to a libretto by the Chilean author, Oscar Jara Azocar (1910–1988).

This opera is one of the few operas in the world composed with the aim to be sung, acted and played exclusively by children. It was written in 1966 and played by Jorge Peña Hen's first Symphonic Orchestra of Children at the Theater of the Girls Public School in La Serena, a city in the northern region of Coquimbo.

In 1967, a production of La Cenicienta went on a tour through several cities in Chile: Valparaíso, Viña del Mar, Concepción and Santiago, the capital. Its debut was considered a great success.

In 1986, a new version of this children's opera was played in Colombia.

In 1998, 25 years after Jorge Peña Hen's assassination by Chile's military coup officials, another version was re-made in La Serena.

In 2004, a new staging by Fondazione Teatro La Fenice, and in 2005 by University of Chile's Theatre in Santiago, Chile.

The plot of the opera is based on Charles Perrault's classic fairy tale Cinderella.

== Sources ==
- Il Giornale del Friuli Libero (April 16, 2010). "15 e 16 aprile, Venezia. Rappresentazione teatrale La Cenicienta (Cenerentola)" (in Italian)
- Pugliaro, Giorgio ed. (2005). Opera 2005. Annuario dell'opera lirica in Italia. EDT srl, p. 299. ISBN 88-7063-864-2 (in Italian)
- Universia Chile (August 14, 2004). "En la Universidad de Chile estrenan documental 'Jorge Peña Hen: su música y los niños'" (in Spanish)
