= The Shadow of Your Smile (Andy Williams album) =

Studio album by Andy Williams
- Released: April 1966
- Recorded: 1966
- Genre: Traditional pop; standards
- Length: 34:18
- Label: Columbia
- Producer: Robert Mersey

Andy Williams chronology
May Each Day (1966)	The Shadow of Your Smile (1966)	In the Arms of Love (1966)

Singles from The Shadow of Your Smile
- 1. "Bye Bye Blues" Released: January 23, 1966

The Shadow of Your Smile is the eighteenth studio album by American pop singer Andy Williams, released in April 1966 by Columbia Records. The album includes covers of "Michelle" and "Yesterday", the same pair of Beatles ballads that labelmate Johnny Mathis recorded for his 1966 album of the same name. For Williams these selections initiated a trend away from the traditional pop formula that his album output at Columbia up until this point had adhered to.

The release debuted on Billboard magazine's Top LP's chart in the issue dated May 14, 1966, remaining on the chart for 54 weeks and peaking at number six. It debuted on the Cashbox albums chart in the issue dated May 7, 1966, and remained on the chart for 29 weeks, peaking at number nine. It entered the UK charts in July and spent four weeks there, reaching number 27. The album received a Gold certification from the Recording Industry Association of America on September 27, 1966.

The single, "Bye Bye Blues", bubbled under Billboard's Hot 100, reaching number 127, and got to number 18 on the magazine's Easy Listening chart.

The album was released on compact disc as one of two albums on one CD by Collectables Records on March 23, 1999, along with Williams's 1965 Columbia album, Andy Williams' Dear Heart. It was also released as one of two albums on one CD by Sony Music Distribution on December 28, 1999, paired this time with Williams's 1962 Columbia album, Warm and Willing. The Shadow of Your Smile was included in a 2001 box set entitled Classic Album Collection, Vol. 1, which contained 17 of his studio albums and three compilations.

== Reception ==
Professional ratings
Review scores
Source	Rating
AllMusic	3/5 stars
The Encyclopedia of Popular Music	3/5 stars
Record Mirror	4/5 stars

William Ruhlmann of AllMusic wrote that this album "had a slower, more languorous feel than earlier Williams albums, and it had more vocal risk-taking." He described "notable changes in Williams' approach" that included the Beatles tracks and covers of two bossa nova songs by Antonio Carlos Jobim that "indicated that Williams was not content to simply turn out the same sort of album over and over, and that he was paying attention to the changes in popular music around him."

Variety wrote that "Williams' way with a ballad is spotlighted on number like "Meditation", a bossa nova accompanied by guitarist-composer Antonio Carlos Jobim who's also present on "How Insenaitive". Billboard magazine described the album as "well produced and well performed." Record World referred to it as a "romantic package" Cashbox described the album as "a wonderfully pleasing listening experience" noted he does an equally sweet job on recent tunes the likes of “Yesterday” and “Michelle"American Record Guide claims "Williams's is deeper, and he does nicely by That Old Feeling." Record Mirror described the album as "a nice late-night album, giving it four-star rating. while both The Encyclopedia of Popular Music and AllMusic gave the album a three-star rating as well.

== Track listing ==
=== Side one ===
1. "The Shadow of Your Smile (Love Theme from The Sandpiper)" from The Sandpiper (Johnny Mandel, Paul Francis Webster) – 3:04
2. "That Old Feeling" from Vogues of 1938 (Lew Brown, Sammy Fain) – 2:51
3. "Meditation" with Antônio Carlos Jobim (Norman Gimbel, Antônio Carlos Jobim, Newton Mendonça) – 3:06
4. "Try to Remember" from The Fantasticks (Tom Jones, Harvey Schmidt) – 2:55
5. "Michelle" (John Lennon, Paul McCartney) – 3:25
6. "Somewhere" from West Side Story (Leonard Bernstein, Stephen Sondheim) – 3:00

=== Side two ===
1. "The Summer of Our Love" (Marty Paich, Paul Francis Webster) – 2:38
2. "Peg O' My Heart" from Ziegfeld Follies (Alfred Bryan, Fred Fisher) – 2:24
3. "How Insensitive " with Antonio Carlos Jobim (Vinícius de Moraes, Norman Gimbel, Antonio Carlos Jobim) – 2:40
4. "Yesterday" (John Lennon, Paul McCartney) – 2:50
5. "Bye Bye Blues" (David Bennett; Chauncey Gray, Frederick Hamm, Bert Lown) – 2:43
6. "A Taste of Honey" (Ric Marlow, Bobby Scott) – 2:47

== Charts ==
Chart (1966)	Peak position
US Top LPs (Billboard)	6
US Cashbox	9
UK Albums Chart	27

== Grammy nominations ==
This album brought the sixth and final Grammy nomination that Williams received over the course of his career, this time in the category for Best Vocal Performance, Male. This nomination did not focus on the performance of a particular song but rather Williams's performance of the album as a whole. The winner was Frank Sinatra for the single "Strangers in the Night", a song that Williams went on to record for his 1967 album Born Free.

== Personnel ==
From the liner notes for the original album:

- Andy Williams – vocals
- Robert Mersey - arranger/conductor ("That Old Feeling", "Meditation", "Peg O' My Heart", "How Insensitive", "Bye Bye Blues"), producer
- Jack Elliott - arranger ("Yesterday"), conductor ("The Shadow of Your Smile", "Try to Remember", "Michelle", "Somewhere", "The Summer of Our Love", "Yesterday", "A Taste of Honey")
- Bob Florence - arranger ("Try to Remember", "Michelle", "A Taste of Honey")
- Dick Hazard - arranger ("The Shadow of Your Smile")
- Johnny Mandel - arranger ("Somewhere")
- Marty Paich - arranger ("The Summer of Our Love")

== Bibliography ==
- O'Neil, Thomas (1999), The Grammys, Perigree Books, ISBN 0-399-52477-0
- Whitburn, Joel (1993), Joel Whitburn's Top Adult Contemporary, 1961-1993, Record Research Inc., ISBN 0-89820-099-7
- Whitburn, Joel (2009), Joel Whitburn's Top Pop Singles, 1955-2008, Record Research Inc., ISBN 978-0-89820-180-2
- Larkin, Colin (2007), The Encyclopedia of Popular Music, Omnibus Press, ISBN 9-7818-4609-8567
- Whitburn, Joel (2010), Joel Whitburn Presents Top Pop Albums, Seventh Edition, Record Research Inc., ISBN 978-0-89820-183-3
