= Jorge Peña Hen =

Chilean composer and academic

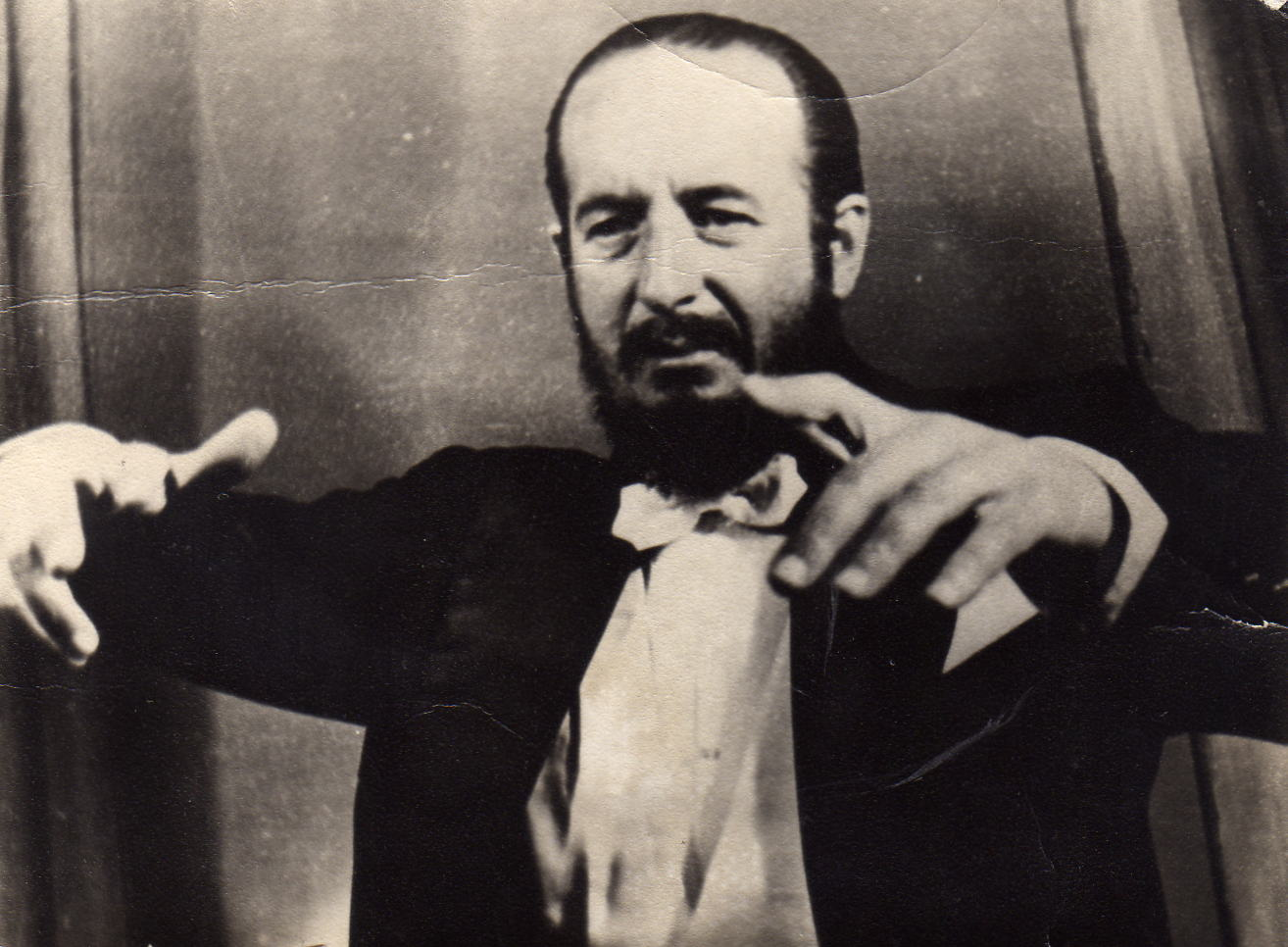
- Jorge Peña Hen, conducting La Serena Philharmonic Orchestra, Chile
- Born: Jorge Washington Peña Hen; January 16, 1928; Santiago de Chile, Chile
- Died: October 16, 1973 (aged 45); La Serena, Chile
- Occupations: Composer and musician
- Known for: "Chopin" by his friends
- Political party: Socialist Party

Jorge Washington Peña Hen (January 16, 1928 – October 16, 1973) was a Chilean composer and musician, founder of the first children's symphony orchestra in Latin America. Due to his militancy in the Socialist Party, he was shot by the Chilean Army during the passage of the Caravan of Death in the Coquimbo Region.

== Works ==
His children's opera La Cenicienta was composed in 1966. It was restaged in 2004 by Fondazione Teatro La Fenice, and in 2005 by University of Chile's Theatre in Santiago Chile.

== Early life ==
He was the son of Tomás Peña Fernández, doctor, mayor, councilor, socialist social actor and politician, and Vitalia Hen Muñoz. On his paternal side, he was a descendant of Tomás Peña, a hero of the La Serena Artisan Society and of revolutionary regionalism, and of José Antonio Peña, commander of the Huasquina Legion who fought in the army of Pedro León Gallo and died in the Battle of The Parrots during 1859 revolution.

He was the eldest of three brothers made up of Silvia and Rubén. From an early age he demonstrated leadership qualities, as a student leader, as well as his talent as a born composer and creator, writing his first piece of music at the age of fourteen. At the age of 19, within the University of Chile, his qualities as an organizer were immediately noted, founding, together with Gustavo Becerra, Alfonso Castagnetto and Sergio Canut de Bon, the magazine Psalterium, to collect both the concerns of the students and the concerns regarding the Chilean artistic milieu in general.

After finishing his piano and viola studies, he entered the National Conservatory to study composition and orchestral conducting with the most renowned Chilean teachers. At the same time, he served as president of the student union and introduced important reforms for benefit of music and art.

== Music career ==
In 1950 he settled in La Serena with his wife, the pianist Nella Camarda, with whom he had two children named María Fedora and Juan Cristián.

His work in teaching and cultural and musical diffusion was developed in La Serena. There he created the Bach Society of La Serena in 1950 to promote musical life in the area and the La Serena Philharmonic Orchestra in 1959, in a city where there was no cultural activity. To celebrate the ten-year anniversary of this society, he conducted the St Matthew Passion in La Serena. by Bach, performed for the first time in Chile. He also created a Polyphonic Choir and Chamber Groups that transformed the northern city in an important musical and cultural center.

In addition, he was a precursor to the creation of the Regional Conservatory of La Serena in 1956, the first distribution of the University of Chile in the province. He was a great promoter of music and culture in La Serena and the current region of Coquimbo. He motivated concerts in theaters, schools and outdoors, choir festivals, musical tours, Latin American musical gatherings, and the "Christmas Altarpieces" that massive shows in which the entire city participated. He also participated in the development of the Dance Corps and the Performing Arts Department of the regional conservatory.

Complex choral symphony premiered works to date not been implemented in Chile, operas, music festivals and gatherings Symphonic American teachers.

=== Versatile ===
Composer, conductor, founder of institutions, his most emblematic of the high social content involved was the creation in 1964 of the first Children's Symphony Orchestra of Chile and Latin America, made up mostly of poor children who sought in the poorest schools in La Serena. Created a Charter School of Music, (the Escuela Experimental de Música "Jorge Peña Hen") with violin workshop, where children did their traditional curriculum and had strong emphasis on education and instrumental music, dance and body drama. As part of orchestras and bands, which made successful tours throughout Chile and neighboring countries. In 1961, he hosted the Chamber Orchestra of Antofagasta, which later would become the Philharmonic Orchestra.

=== Travel ===
Their quality as Conductor earned him invitations to conduct in Chile and Argentina. His work as a composer starts very young. At age 21 he won the "Caupolicán" by the music of the Chilean film "River Below". He composed Concerto for Piano and Orchestra, Quartet (winner), Suite for Strings, many adaptations and arrangements of great composers, for children, symphonic, choral, incidental, for piano, for Retablos Christmas, Children's Opera Cinderella, selected worldwide and staged by Fondazione Teatro La Fenice in Venice (2005), Mounted in the Teatro de la Universidad de Chile, as Fondart Project (September 2005), with the OSEM and choirboys from schools in the capital, taking the design and regie his daughter Maria Fedora. The versatility of Jorge Peña Hen as a composer is felt immediately, but the teacher did not dedicate all his time to composition, chose to put their skills to serve the society, having as main objective the mass of art, music. That all children have the opportunity to meet and enjoy the music and through it access to a world of equality in opportunities.

all children have abilities and talents, you just have to give them the tools to develop them.

— Jorge Peña Hen

=== Works composed ===
Chanson D'Automne composed for chorus and orchestra, Concerto for piano and orchestra in C minor (both pieces at the age of 16 years), composed well, Andante and Allegro for Violin and Orchestra of children, Concertino for piano and orchestra of children, children's opera "Cinderella", String Quartet, Quintet for strings, two pieces for wind quintet, Sonata for violin and piano, Tonada for orchestra, ballet music for the coronation song cycle for baritone and orchestra, Twilight Montepatria, incidental music for films: Rio Abajo, and The Fertile Earth Nitrate, music for eight Retablos Christmas.

He made many orchestrations and adaptations of works for their child musicians, including "The Toys' Shop" by Prospero Bisquertt.
