= The Penny Friend =

- Music: William Roy
- Lyrics: William Roy
- Book: William Roy
- Basis: J.M. Barrie's A Kiss for Cinderella
- Productions: 1966 Off Broadway

The Penny Friend is a musical with music, lyrics, and book by William Roy based on a play by J. M. Barrie, A Kiss for Cinderella. It featured Bernadette Peters in her first Off-Broadway role. William Roy later worked with Peters as a writer, arranger and conductor for her nightclub act.

== Production history ==
The Penny Friend opened off-Broadway at Stage 73 on December 26, 1966, and closed on January 22, 1967, after 32 performances. The director was Benno D. Frank, and musical numbers were staged by Lou Kristofer. The producer was Thomas Hammond (Bernadette Peters' manager).

== Plot summary ==
The story involves a girl who thinks that she is Cinderella, and whose friends go along with her story. After talking about attending a ball, she actually appears to be at the ball. However, it is soon evident that her story is all fantasy. In reality Cinderella is lying unconscious in a snow bank. She is brought to a hospital where she dies.

== Characters and cast ==
- Cinderella -- Bernadette Peters
- Mrs. Maloney—Georgia Creighton
- Mr. McGill—Bill Drew
- Kate Bodie—Charlotte Fairchild
- Maudie—Terry Forman
- George—Dewey Golkin
- Lady—Sherill Price
- Invite—Jimmy Rivers
- Policeman -- Jamie Ross
- Mr. Jennings—John Senger
- Charles Bodie -- Michael Wager
