= My Favorite Guitars (Chet Atkins album) =

Studio album by Chet Atkins
- Released: 1964
- Recorded: RCA 'Nashville Sound' Studios, Nashville, TN
- Genre: Country, pop
- Length: 29:06
- Label: RCA Victor LSP-3316 (Stereo) LPM-3316 (Mono)
- Producer: Bob Ferguson

Chet Atkins chronology
| The Best of Chet Atkins (1964) | My Favorite Guitars (1964) | More of That Guitar Country (1965) |

Professional ratings
Review scores
| Source | Rating |
|---|---|
| Allmusic | 2.5/5 stars |
| Record Mirror | 4/5 stars |

My Favorite Guitars is the twenty-sixth studio album by Chet Atkins. The guitars referred to are Atkins' signature Gretsch "Country Gentleman" electric guitar, a Brazilian Del Vecchio (guitar maker) resonator guitar presented to him by Los Indios Tabajaras, and a Spanish Juan Estruch classical guitar, all visible on the LP cover photo. It is another example of Atkins' 1960s easy-going, easy-listening guitar playing.

The album peaked at No. 86 on the Cashbox Top 100 Albums chart, during a four-week stay on it.

== Reissues ==
- My Favorite Guitars was reissued on CD along with It's a Guitar World in 1995 on One Way Records.

== Track listing ==
=== Side one ===
1. "Levee Walking" (Jerry Reed Hubbard, Henry Strzelecki) – 1:56
2. "Wimoweh" (Campbell) – 2:45
3. "One Note Samba" (Hendricks, Antônio Carlos Jobim, Newton Mendonça) – 2:04
4. "Moon of Manakoora" (Frank Loesser, Alfred Newman) – 2:09
5. "Travelin'" (James Arnold Miller) – 2:18
6. "Say It With Soul" (Fred Carter, Jr.) – 2:45

=== Side two ===
1. "Josephine" (Burke Bivens, Gus Kahn, Wayne King) – 2:06
2. "Rose Ann" (Jerry Reed) – 2:20
3. "Sukiyaki" (Hashida Naramura Rokusuke) – 2:28
4. "It Don't Mean a Thing (If It Ain't Got That Swing)" (Duke Ellington, Irving Mills) – 2:18
5. "El Vaquero" (Atkins, Wayne Moss) – 2:07
6. "Chopin Waltz No. 10 in B Minor" (Frédéric Chopin; arranged by Chet Atkins) – 3:50

== Personnel ==
- Chet Atkins – guitar
- Chuck Seitz – engineer

== Charts ==
| Chart (1965) | Peak position |
|---|---|
| US Cashbox Top 100 Albums | 86 |
