= Chet Atkins Picks on the Beatles =

Studio album by Chet Atkins
- Released: March 1966
- Recorded: RCA 'Nashville Sound' Studios, Nashville, Tennessee
- Genre: Country; pop; rock
- Length: 30:11
- Label: RCA Victor LPM 3531 (Mono), LSP-3531 (Stereo)
- Producer: Chet Atkins, Bob Ferguson

Chet Atkins chronology
More of That Guitar Country (1965)	Chet Atkins Picks on the Beatles (1966)	From Nashville with Love (1966)

Chet Atkins Picks on the Beatles is the twenty-eighth studio album by American guitarist Chet Atkins. Atkins interprets a selection of songs by the Beatles on this album.

Atkins never recorded with the Gretsch Country Gentleman 12-string guitar that was made especially for him and is pictured on the cover. The album's sleeve features liner notes by George Harrison and there is a photo of Atkins wearing a "Beatle wig" on the back cover.

== Reissues ==
Chet Atkins Picks on the Beatles was issued on compact disc on 30 January 1996.

== Chart performance ==
Chet Atkins Picks on the Beatles peaked at No. 6 on the Billboard country albums chart and No. 112 on the Top LP's chart.

== Accolades ==
The recording was nominated for Best Instrumental Recording (other than Jazz) at the 1967 Grammy awards.

== Critical reception ==
Professional ratings
Review scores
Source	Rating
AllMusic	2/5 stars
Country Standard Time	(no rating)

Writing for AllMusic, critic Stephen Thomas Erlewine called the album "an entertaining, if ultimately disposable, artifact", concluding that Atkins' "playing is subtle and tasteful, but the album doesn't provide enough inventive or energetic performances to be of lasting interest." Reviewing the CD re-release in 1996, Norm Rosenfield of Country Standard Time wrote "You don't have to be a guitar fan to enjoy Atkins' arrangements that add unexpected harmonies with generous helpings of class. So when Chet picks on the Beatles it's only the highest form of flattery."

== Track listing ==
All tracks written by John Lennon and Paul McCartney.

=== Side one ===
1. "I Feel Fine" – 1:57
2. "Yesterday" – 3:09
3. "If I Fell" – 2:11
4. "Can’t Buy Me Love" – 2:31
5. "I'll Cry Instead" – 2:36
6. "Things We Said Today" – 2:34

=== Side two ===
1. "A Hard Day's Night" – 2:27
2. "I'll Follow the Sun" – 2:06
3. "She's a Woman" – 2:40
4. "And I Love Her" – 2:22
5. "Michelle" – 2:46
6. "She Loves You" – 2:34

== Personnel ==
- Chet Atkins – guitar
- Charlie McCoy – harmonica

== Charts ==
Chart (1966)	Peak position
US Billboard Top LP's	112
US Hot Country Albums (Billboard)	6
US Cash Box Top 100 Albums	63
