= List of dodecaphonic and serial compositions =

This is an incomplete list of musical pieces composed in the twelve-tone technique and pieces that use serialism.

== List of musical pieces composed in the twelve-tone technique ==
- Second Viennese School
  - Alban Berg
    - Kammerkonzert, for piano, violin, and winds (1923–25)
    - Lyrische Suite, for string quartet (1925/26)
    - Der Wein, concert aria for soprano and orchestra after a poem by Charles Baudelaire (1929)
    - Lulu, opera after Die Büchse der Pandora by Frank Wedekind (1928–35)
    - Violinkonzert, for violin and orchestra (1935)
  - Hanns Eisler
    - Palmström, song cycle op. 5 (1923/24)
    - Zeitungsausschnitte (Newspaper Clippings), song cycle op. 11 (1926)
    - "14 Arten den Regen zu beschreiben" (1940, for the 1929 short documentary Regen)
  - Arnold Schoenberg
    - Waltz from 5 Klavierstücke, op. 23
    - Serenade, op. 24
    - Suite for Piano, op. 25
    - Wind Quintet, op. 26
    - Four Pieces for mixed voices, op. 27
    - Suite for piano, piccolo clarinet, clarinet, bass clarinet, violin, viola, and cello, op. 29
    - String Quartet No. 3, op. 30
    - Variations for Orchestra, op. 31
    - Von heute auf morgen, op. 32
    - Klavierstück, op. 33a
    - Klavierstück, op. 33b
    - Moses und Aron (incomplete)
    - Begleitungsmusik zu einer Lichtspielscene [Accompanying music to a film scene], op. 34
    - Concerto for Violin and Orchestra, op. 36
    - String Quartet No. 4, op. 37
    - Concerto for Piano & Orchestra, op. 42
    - String Trio, op. 45
    - A Survivor from Warsaw, op. 46
    - Fantasy for Violin & Piano, op. 47
  - Anton Webern
    - Three Lieder, op. 17 (1924–1925)
    - Three Lieder, for voice, E♭ clarinet and guitar, op. 18 (1925)
    - Two Lieder, for mixed choir, celesta, guitar, violin, clarinet and bass clarinet, op. 19 (1926)
    - String Trio, op. 20 (1927)
    - Symphony, op. 21 (1928)
    - Quartet for violin, clarinet, tenor saxophone and piano, op. 22 (1930)
    - Three Songs on Hildegard Jone's Viae inviae, for voice and piano, op. 23 (1934)
    - Concerto for flute, oboe, clarinet, horn, trumpet, trombone, violin, viola and piano, op. 24 (1934)
    - Three Lieder on texts by Hildegard Jone, for voice and piano, op. 25 (1934–35)
    - Das Augenlicht, for mixed choir and orchestra, on a text by Hildegard Jone, op. 26 (1935)
    - Variations, for solo piano, op. 27 (1936)
    - String Quartet, op. 28 (1937–38) – the tone row of this piece is based around the BACH motif
    - Cantata No. 1, for soprano, mixed choir and orchestra, op. 29 (1938–39)
    - Variations, for orchestra, op. 30 (1940)
    - Cantata No. 2, for soprano, bass, choir and orchestra, op. 31 (1941–43)

- Milton Babbitt
  - Virtually all published works after 1947
- John Cage
  - Sonata for Clarinet (1933)
- Carlos Chávez
  - Soli II for wind quintet (1961)
  - Variations for Violin and Piano (1961)
- Aaron Copland
  - Piano Quartet (1950)
  - Piano Fantasy (1957)
  - Connotations for orchestra (1961)
  - Inscape for orchestra (1967)
- Henry Cowell
  - Variations for Orchestra (1959)
- Luigi Dallapiccola
  - Virtually all published works after 1942
- Benjamin Frankel
  - Film score for The Curse of the Werewolf (1961)
  - His 8 symphonies (see e.g. the article on Symphony No.1 (Op.33, 1958)) either use the twelve-tone technique, or serial techniques with other kinds of rows, or both
- Lou Harrison
  - Rapunzel (1952)
  - Symphony on G (1952)
- Josef Matthias Hauer
  - All works written after August 1919 (though the twelve-tone technique used is not Schoenberg's system)
  - Zwölftonspiele (approximately one thousand works) (after 1940)
- Eunice Katunda
  - Quatro Epígrafes (1948) for piano
  - Homenagem a Schoenberg (1949) for clarinet, viola, cello, and piano
- Ernst Krenek
  - Karl V
- Maurice Le Roux
  - 2 pieces dodecaphoniques, pour piano seul (1945/46)
- Luigi Nono
  - Composizione no.1, for orchestra (1951)
  - Variazioni canoniche sulla serie dell’op. 41 di A. Schönberg, for chamber orchestra (1950)
- Walter Piston
  - Chromatic Study on the Name of Bach, for organ
  - Concerto for Clarinet and Orchestra
  - Concerto for Flute and Orchestra
  - Fantasy for Violin and Orchestra
  - Ricercare for Orchestra
  - String Quartet No. 5
  - Symphony No. 1
  - Symphony No. 8
  - Variations for Cello and Orchestra
- Leonard Rosenman
  - The Cobweb (1955)
- Humphrey Searle
  - All works from the Intermezzo for eleven instruments, Op. 8 (1946), onwards
- Roger Sessions
  - Virtually all published works after 1953 (exceptions include his Mass, and the twelve-tone technique used rarely follows Schoenberg's system)
- Karlheinz Stockhausen
  - Drei Lieder for alto voice and chamber orchestra, Nr. 1/10 (1950)
  - Sonatine, for violin and piano, Nr. 1/8 (1951)
- Igor Stravinsky, works from 1952 forward:
  - Cantata (1952)
  - Three Songs From Shakespeare (1953)
  - In Memoriam Dylan Thomas (1954)
  - Canticum Sacrum (1955)
  - Agon (1957)
  - Threni (1958)
  - Movements for Piano and Orchestra (1958–59)
  - A Sermon, a Narrative and a Prayer (1961)
  - The Flood (1962)
  - The Dove Descending Breaks the Air (1962)
  - Variations: Aldous Huxley in memoriam (1963–64)
  - Requiem Canticles (1966)
- Van der Graaf Generator
  - "After the Flood" (1970, from the album The Least We Can Do Is Wave to Each Other) – includes a twelve tone piece arranged by David Jackson
- Egon Wellesz
  - Symphony No. 5, Op. 75 (1955–56)
- Charles Wuorinen
  - Most mature works
- Frank Zappa
  - Waltz for Guitar (1958)

== List of pieces that use serialism ==
Organized by composer:

- Tadeusz Baird
  - Cassazione per orchestra (1956)
  - String Quartet (1957)
  - Four Essays (1958)
  - Erotyki (1961)
- Jean Barraqué
  - ... Au delà du hasard (premier "commentaire" de "Affranchi du hasard" et du "Temps restitué") for four instrumental groups and one vocal group (1958–59)
  - Chant après chant for six percussionists, voice and piano (1966)
  - Concerto for six instrumental groups and two solo instruments (vibraphone and clarinet) (1962–68)
  - Étude for 3-track tape (1952–53)
  - Séquence for voice, percussion and chamber ensemble (1950–55)
  - Sonata for Piano (1950–52)
  - Le Temps restitué for soprano, chorus and orchestra (1956–68)
- Pierre Boulez
  - Anthèmes, for violin solo (1991/94)
  - Anthèmes II, for violin and live electronics (1997)
  - Cummings ist der Dichter, for chorus and ensemble (1970/1986)
  - Dérive 1, for six instruments (1984)
  - Dérive 2, for eleven instruments (1988/2002/2006)
  - Domaines, for clarinet solo or for clarinet and six instrumental groups (1968)
  - Études (2), musique concrète (1951–52)
  - ...explosante-fixe...
    - for flute, clarinet, and trumpet (1971–72)
    - for flute, clarinet, trumpet, harp, vibraphone, violin, viola, cello, and electronics (1973–74)
    - version for vibraphone and electronics (1986)
    - for solo MIDI flute, two "shadow" flutes, chamber orchestra, and electronics (1991–93)
    - version for vibraphone and electronics (1986)
  - Figures—Doubles—Prismes, for orchestra (1957–58/1964/1968)
  - Improvisé—pour le Dr. K, for flute, clarinet, piano, violin, and cello (1969; revised 2005)
  - Incises, for piano (1994/2001)
  - Livre, for string quartet (1948); two movements reworked for string orchestra (1968/1989)
  - Le marteau sans maître (1955–57)
  - Messagesquisse, for solo cello and six cellos (1976)
  - Notations
    - for piano (1945)
    - I–IV and VII for orchestra (1978–1984/1997)
  - Poésie pour pouvoir, for tape and 3 orchestras (1955/58, withdrawn)
  - Polyphonie X (1950–51)
  - Sonata No. 1, for piano (1946)
  - Sonata No. 2, for piano (1947–48)
  - Sonata No. 3, for piano (1958–63, unfinished)
  - Pli selon pli (1957–62)
  - Répons, for six soloists, chamber orchestra, and live electronics (1981–84)
  - Rituel in Memoriam Bruno Maderna, for large chamber ensemble in eight groups (1974–75)
  - Sonatine, for flute and piano (1946)
  - Structures, book I for two pianos (1952)
  - Structures, book II for two pianos (1961)
  - Sur incises, for 3 pianos, 3 harps, and 3 mallet percussion instruments (1996/1998)
- Jacques Calonne
  - Orbes for orchestra (1965)
- Benjamin Frankel
  - Film score for The Prisoner (1955, starring Alec Guinness)
- Alexander Goehr
  - Piano Sonata (1952)
  - The Deluge (1958)
- Karel Goeyvaerts
  - Nummer 1, Sonata for two pianos (1950–51)
  - Nummer 2, for thirteen instruments (1951)
  - Nummer 3 met gestreken en geslagen tonen, for chamber ensemble (1952)
  - Nummer 4 met dode tonen, electronic music (1952)
  - Nummer 5 met zuivere tonen, electronic music (1953)
  - Nummer 6 met 180 klankvoorwerpen (1954)
  - Nummer 7 met convergerende en divergerende niveaus, electronic music (1955)
- Ernest Gold
  - Score for On the Beach (1959)
- Jerry Goldsmith
  - Freud (1962)
  - Planet of the Apes (1968)
  - The Illustrated Man (1969)
  - Music for Orchestra (1969)
  - Christus Apollo (1970)
  - The Mephisto Waltz (1971)
  - Escape from the Planet of the Apes (1971)
- Wojciech Kilar
  - Riff 62 (1962)
- Gottfried Michael Koenig
  - Zwei Klavierstücke, for piano solo (1957)
  - Quintet for Woodwinds, for flute, oboe, cor anglais, clarinet, and bassoon (1958–59)
  - String Quartet 1959 (1959)
- Ernst Krenek
  - String Quartet No. 6 (for example)
- Witold Lutosławski
  - Symphony No. 1 (1947)
  - Five Songs to Words by Kazimiera Iłłakowiczówna for soprano and piano (1957); Arrangement with Orchestra (1958)
  - Musique funèbre (1958)
  - Trois poèmes d'Henri Michaux (1963)
  - Livre pour orchestre (1968)
  - Cello Concerto (1970)
  - Mi-parti (1976)
  - Grave: Metamorphoses for Cello and Piano (1981)
  - Symphony No. 3 (1983)
- Johnny Mandel
  - Point Blank (1967)
- Luigi Nono
  - Canti per tredeci, 13 instruments, (1954–55)
  - Il canto sospeso (1955–56)
  - Cori di Didone, for chorus and percussion (1958)
  - Diario polacco: Composizione no. 2 (1958–59)
  - Due espressioni, for orchestra (1953)
  - Incontri, for 24 instruments (1955)
  - Polifonica—monodia—ritmica, for seven instrumentalists (1951)
  - Varianti, for violin, woodwinds, and strings (1957)
- Krzysztof Penderecki
  - St Luke Passion (Penderecki) (1966)
- Henri Pousseur
  - Apostrophe et six Réflexions for piano (1964–66)
  - Aquarius-Mémorial (in memoriam Karel Goeyvaerts)
    1. Les Litanies d'Icare for piano (1994)
    2. Danseurs Gnidiens cherchant la Perle clémentine for chamber orchestra (1998)
    3. Les Fouilles de Jéruzona for orchestra (1995)
    4. Icare au Jardin du Verseau for piano and chamber orchestra (1999)
      La Guirlande de Pierre for soprano, baritone and piano (1997)
  - At Moonlight, Dowland's Shadow passes along Ginkaku-Ji for shakuhachi, shamisen, and koto (1989)
  - Ballade berlinoise for piano solo (1977)
  - Canines for voice and piano (1980)
  - Caractères for piano (1961)
  - Chroniques berlinoises for piano and string quartet with baritone ad lib. (1975)
  - Chroniques canines for two pianos with soprano ad lib (1984)
  - Chroniques illustrées for large orchestra with baritone ad lib. (1976)
  - Couleurs croisées for large orchestra (1967)
  - Crosses of Crossed Colors for vocal soloist, two to five pianos, six tape-recorder operators, two turntablists, and two radio operators (1970)
  - Déclarations d'Orage for reciter, soprano, baritone, three improvising instruments (alto saxophone, tuba, synthesizer), large orchestra and tape (1988–89)
  - Dichterliebesreigentraum for soprano, baritone, two solo pianos, choir and orchestra (1992–93)
  - Les Éphémérides d'Icare 2 for a soloist, three-part concertino, and four instrumental quartets (1970)
  - Die Erprobung des Petrus Hebraïcus chamber opera in three acts, libretto by Léo Wintgens after Michel Butor (1974). Several "satellite" works are related to this opera:
  - Flexions IV for viola solo (1980)
  - Humeurs du Futur quotidien for two reciters and chamber orchestra (1978)
  - Les Icare africains for solo voices, ad lib. choir, and orchestra (2002)
  - Leçons d'Enfer music theatre for 2 actors, 3 singers, 7 instruments, tape, and live electronics; texts by Arthur Rimbaud and Michel Butor (1990–91)
  - Madrigal I for clarinet (1958)
  - Madrigal II for 4 early instruments (flute, violin, viola da gamba, harpsichord) (1961)
  - Madrigal III for clarinet, violin, cello, 2 percussionists, and piano (1962)
  - Mnémosyne monody solo voice or instrument, or unison choir (1968)
  - Mnémosyne II for variable media (1969)
  - Mobile for two pianos (1957–58)
  - Navigations for harp (2000)
  - Ode for string quartet (1960–61)
  - La Paganania for solo violin (1982)
  - La Paganania seconda for solo cello (1982)
  - Paraboles-Mix electronic music (1972)
  - Pédigrée for female voice and seven instruments (1980)
  - Phonèmes pour Cathy for mezzo-soprano solo (1966)
  - Prospection for three pianos tuned in sixths of a tone (1952–53)
  - Quintette à la memoire d'Anton Webern for clarinet, bass clarinet, violin, cello, and piano (1955)
  - Rimes pour différentes sources sonores for orchestra and tape (1958)
  - Scambi electronic music (1957)
  - Séismogrammes electronic music (1954)
  - Seize Paysages planétaires ethno-electroacoustical music (2000)
  - Sept Versets des Psaumes de la Pénitence for four vocal soloists or mixed choir (1950)
  - Symphonies à 15 Solistes (1954–55)
  - Tales and Songs from the Bible of Hell four singers with real-time electronic transformation and pre-recorded 4 track tape (1979)
  - Trois Visages à Liège electronic music (1961)
  - Votre Faust (1960–68), opera for five actors, four singers, twelve instruments, and electronic music, libretto by Michel Butor. Plus related "satellite" works:
    - Miroir de Votre Faust (Caractères II) for solo piano and (optional) soprano (1964–65),
    - Jeu de Miroirs de Votre Faust for piano, soprano and tape (1964–65)
    - Echos de Votre Faust for mezzo-soprano, flute, cello, and piano (1961–69),
    - Les Ruines de Jéruzona for mixed choir and "rhythm section" (1978),
    - La Passion selon Guignol for amplified vocal quartet and orchestra (1981),
    - Parade de Votre Faust for orchestra (1974)
    - Aiguillages au carrefour des immortels for 16 or 17 instruments (2002)
    - Il sogno di Leporello: Parade 2 (de Votre Faust) for orchestra (2005)
  - Vue sur les Jardins interdits for saxophone quartet (1973)
- Miklós Rózsa
  - King of Kings (1961)
- David Shire
  - The Taking of Pelham One Two Three (1974)
- Karlheinz Stockhausen
  - Adieu, for wind quintet (flute, oboe, clarinet, bassoon, and horn), Nr. 21 (1966)
  - Alphabet für Liège, Nr. 36 (1972)
    - Am Himmel wandre ich ("In the Sky I Am Walking", American Indian Songs), Nr. 36 1/2 (1972)
  - Amour, 5 pieces for clarinet, flute, or saxophone Nr. 44 (1976)
  - Atmen gibt das Leben, choral opera with orchestra (or orchestra on tape), Nr. 39 (1974/76–77)
  - Aus den sieben Tagen ("From the Seven Days"), 15 texts for intuitive music (performable separately), Nr. 26 (1968)
  - Bassetsu-Trio, for basset horn, trumpet, and trombone, Nr. 3. ex 70 (1997). Arranged from Mittwoch aus Licht, scene 4: Michaelion
  - Carré, for 4 orchestras and choirs, Nr. 10 (1959–60)
  - Dr K–Sextett, for flute, bass clarinet, percussionist (tubular chimes and vibraphone), piano, viola, and cello, Nr. 28 (1968–69)
  - Konkrete Etüde, musique concrète, Nr. 1/5 (1952)
  - Europa-Gruss, Nr. 72 (1992/2002)
  - Expo, for 3 players or singers with 3 short-wave receivers, Nr. 31 (1969–70)
  - Formel, for small orchestra, Nr. ^{1}/_{6} (1951)
  - Fresco, for 4 orchestral groups, Nr. 29 (1969)
  - Für kommende Zeiten, 17 texts for intuitive music, Nr. 33 (1968–70)
  - Gesang der Jünglinge, electronic and concrete music, Nr. 8 (1955–56)
  - Gruppen, for 3 orchestras, Nr. 6 (1955–57)
  - Harlekin, for clarinet, Nr. 42 (1975)
    - Der kleine Harlekin, for clarinet, Nr. 42 1/2 (1975)
  - Helikopter-Streichquartett, for string quartet and 4 helicopters, Nr. 69 (1992–93) [Scene 3 of Mittwoch aus Licht]
  - Herbstmusik, musical theatre for 4 performers, Nr. 40 (1974)
    - Laub und Regen, duet for clarinet and viola, Nr. 40 1/2
  - Hymnen, 4-channel electronic and concrete music (also version with soloists, and Third Region with orchestra), Nr. 22 (1966–67)
  - In Freundschaft, for clarinet (and versions for most other instruments), Nr. 46 (1977)
  - Inori, adorations for 1 or 2 soloists and large orchestra, Nr. 38 (1973–74)
    - Vortrag über HU, for a singer, Nr. 38 1/2 (1974)
  - Jubiläum, for orchestra, Nr. 45 (1977)
  - Klang ("Sound", the 24 Hours of the Day), Nr. 81– (2004–2007)
    - First Hour: Himmelfahrt (Ascension), for organ (or synthesizer), soprano, and tenor, Nr. 81 (2004–05)
    - Second Hour: Freude (Joy), for 2 harps, Nr. 82 (2005)
    - Third Hour: Natürliche Dauern 1–24 (Natural Durations 1–24), for piano, Nr. 83 (2005–06)
    - Fourth Hour: Himmels-Tur (Heaven's Door), for a percussionist and a little girl, Nr. 84 (2005)
    - Fifth Hour: Harmonien (Harmonies), Nr. 85, versions for:
      - bass clarinet, Nr. 85.1 (2006)
      - flute, Nr. 85.2 (2006)
      - trumpet, Nr. 85.3 (2006)
    - Sixth Hour: Schönheit (Beauty), for flute, bass clarinet, and trumpet, Nr. 86 (2006)
    - Seventh Hour: Balance, for flute, English horn, and bass clarinet, Nr. 87 (2007)
    - Eighth Hour: Glück (Bliss), for oboe, English horn, and bassoon, Nr. 88 (2007)
    - Ninth Hour: Hoffnung (Hope), for violin, viola, and cello, Nr. 89 (2007)
    - Tenth Hour: Glanz (Brilliance), for oboe, clarinet, bassoon, trumpet, trombone, tuba, and viola, Nr. 90 (2007)
    - Eleventh Hour: Treue (Fidelity), for E♭ clarinet, basset horn, and bass clarinet, Nr. 91 (2007)
    - Twelfth Hour: Erwachen (Awakening), for soprano saxophone, trumpet, and cello, Nr. 92 (2007)
    - Thirteenth Hour: Cosmic Pulses, electronic music, Nr. 93 (2006–07)
    - Fourteenth Hour: Havona, for bass voice and electronic music, Nr. 94 (2007)
    - Fifteenth Hour: Orvonton, for baritone and electronic music, Nr. 95 (2007)
    - Sixteenth Hour: Uversa, for basset-horn and electronic music, Nr. 96 (2007)
    - Seventeenth Hour: Nebadon, for horn and electronic music, Nr. 97 (2007)
    - Eighteenth Hour: Jerusem, for tenor and electronic music, Nr. 98 (2007)
    - Nineteenth Hour: Urantia, for soprano and electronic music, Nr. 99 (2007)
    - Twentieth Hour: Edentia, for soprano saxophone and electronic music, Nr. 100 (2007)
    - Twenty-first Hour: Paradies (Paradise), for flute and electronic music, Nr. 101 (2007)
  - Klavierstücke
    - Klavierstücke I–IV, Nr. 2 (1952)
    - Klavierstücke V–X, Nr. 4 (1954–55/61)
    - Klavierstück XI, Nr. 7 (1956)
    - Klavierstück XII, ex Nr. 49 3/4 (1979/83)
    - Klavierstück XIII, Nr. 51 1/2 (1981)
    - Klavierstück XIV, ex Nr. 57 2/3 (1984)
    - Synthi-Fou (Klavierstück XV), ex Nr. 61 2/3
    - Klavierstück XVI, Nr. 63 1/2 (1995)
    - Klavierstück XVII, 7 1/2 ex Nr. 64 (1994/99)
    - Klavierstück XVIII, Nr. 73 2/3 (2004)
    - Klavierstück XIX, Nr. 80 (2001/2003)
  - Kontakte ("Contacts"), for electronic sounds, Nr. 12 (1958–60); Kontakte, for electronic sounds, piano, and percussion, Nr. 12 1/2 (1958–60); Originale, musical theatre with Kontakte, Nr. 12 2/3 (1961)
  - Kontra-Punkte ("Counter-Points"), for 10 instruments, Nr. 1 (1952–53)
  - Kreuzspiel, for oboe, bass clarinet, piano, and 3 percussionists, Nr. 1/7 (1951)
  - Kurzwellen, for 6 players with live electronics, plus sound director, Nr. 25 (1968)
  - Licht, Nr. 47–80 (1977–2003)
  - Licht-Ruf, Nr. 67 (1995)
  - Litanei 97, Nr. 74 (1997)
  - Mantra, for 2 pianists (with wood blocks and antique cymbals) and electronics, Nr. 32 (1970)
  - Mikrophonie I, for tamtam (2 players), 2 microphones, 2 filters with potentiometers, and 4 pair of loudspeakers, Nr. 15 (1964)
  - Mikrophonie II, for 12 voices, Hammond organ (or synthesizer), 4 ring modulators, and tape, Nr. 17 (1965)
  - Mixtur, for orchestra, 4 sinewave generators, and 4 ring-modulators, Nr. 16 (1964)
  - Musik im Bauch, for 6 percussionists and music boxes, Nr. 41 (1975)
  - Momente, for soprano solo, 4 choirs, and 13 instrumentalists, Nr. 13 (1962–64/69)
  - Oktophonie (1990/91) electronic music of Tuesday from Light
  - Plus-Minus, 2 x 7 pages for realization, Nr. 14 (1963)
  - Pole, for 2 players or singers with 2 short-wave radios, Nr. 30 (1969–70)
  - Prozession, for 6 players with live electronics, Nr. 23 (1967)
  - Punkte ("Points"), for orchestra, Nr. 1/2 (1952/62/66/93)
  - Quitt ("Even"), for alto flute, clarinet, and trumpet, Nr. 1 ex 59 (1989)
  - Refrain, for piano (+ 3 woodblocks), vibraphone (+ 3 alpine cowbells and keyboard glockenspiel), and celesta (+ 3 antique cymbals), Nr. 11 (1959)
  - Rotary Wind Quintet, for flute, oboe, clarinet, bassoon, and horn, Nr. 70 1/2 (1997)
  - Schlagtrio ("Percussive Trio") [originally Schlagquartett], for piano and 2 x 3 [originally 3 x 2] timpani, Nr. 1/3 (1952)
  - Sirius, electronic music with trumpet, soprano, bass clarinet, and bass voice, Nr. 43 (1975–77)
  - Solo, for a melody instrument and feedback (live electronics with 4 technicians, 4 pair of loudspeakers), Nr. 19 (1965–66)
  - Spiel ("Play"), for orchestra, Nr. 1/4 (1952)
  - Spiral, for a soloist with short-wave receiver and live electronics with sound director, Nr. 27 (1968)
  - Sternklang ("Star Sound"), park music for five groups, Nr. 34 (1971)
  - Stimmung ("Tuning"), for 6 vocalists, Nr. 24 (1968)
  - Stop, for small orchestra in 6 groups, Nr. 18 (1965)
  - Strahlen ("Rays"), for a percussionist and ten-channel sound recording, Nr. 80 1/2 (2002)
  - Studie I, electronic music, Nr. 3/I (1953)
  - Studie II, electronic music, Nr. 3/II (1954)
  - Sukat, for alto flute and basset-horn, Nr. 2 ex 60 (1989)
  - Telemusik, electronic and concrete music, Nr. 20 (1966)
  - Thinki, for flute, Nr. 1 ex 70 (1997)
  - Tierkreis ("Zodiac"), 12 melodies of the star signs, for a melody and/or chording instrument, Nr. 41 1/2 (1974–75)
  - Trans, for orchestra and tape, Nr. 35 (1971)
  - Traum-Formel ("Dream Formula"), for basset-horn, Nr. 51 2/3 (1981)
  - Trumpetent (a.k.a. "Trompetent"), for 4 trumpeters, Nr. 73 (1995)
  - Türin, for Tür (door), rin, and speaker (versions in German and English), with electronics (2006)
  - Unsichtbare Chöre, 16-channel recording of a cappella choir, for 8-channel playback, ex Nr. 79 (1979)
  - Vibra-Elufa, for vibraphone, Nr. 9 3/4 ex 64 (2003)
  - Xi, for a melody instrument with microtones, Nr. 1 ex 55 (1986)
  - Ylem, for 19 players, Nr. 37 (1972)
  - Ypsilon, for a melody instrument with microtones, Nr. 2 ex 59 (1989)
  - Zeitmaße ("Time Measures"), for oboe, flute, cor anglais, clarinet, and bassoon, Nr. 5 (1955–56)
  - Zyklus ("Cycle"), for a percussionist, Nr. 9 (1959)
- Gilles Tremblay
  - Cantique de durées (1960)

== See also ==
- List of atonal compositions
- List of tone rows and series
