= Chant après chant =

Composition by Jean Barraqué

Chant après chant (Song after Song) is a composition for soprano singer, piano, and six percussionists, by the French composer Jean Barraqué, written in 1966. It is the third part of a projected but unfinished cycle of works based on Hermann Broch's novel The Death of Virgil, and uses texts written by the composer as well as extracts from the second book of Broch's novel, in the French translation by Albert Kohn. A performance lasts about twenty-five minutes.

== History ==
Chant après chant was composed rapidly, in just a few weeks, on a commission from Les Percussions de Strasbourg. It was premiered in the Palais des Fêtes at the Strasbourg Festival on 23 June 1966. The performers were Berthe Kal (soprano), André Krust (piano), and Les Percussions de Strasbourg, conducted by Charles Bruck. The manuscript score is not dated, but was finished late in April 1966. When the score was published in 1968, it bore a dedication to Madame Edouard Blivet, the daughter of Francine Le Faucheur. However, on 20 August 1970, Barraqué added to the manuscript score a dedication to Maria and Michel Bernstein.

The first commercial recording was made in Copenhagen for Valois Records, from 20 to 23 December 1969, in the presence of the composer.

== Analysis ==
The programme note written by Barraqué for the premiere begins:

Chant après chant is part of a vast musical composition inspired by Hermann Broch's The Death of Virgil. The complete work would comprise five Books. Each Book includes a collection of works of diverse dimensions and for different vocal and instrumental formations. Chant après chant is an extract from the Second Book, which relates the night-time dread that decides [sic] a creator—on the threshold of death—to destroy his work.

Acoustical resonance and visual images of light, sparks, and flashing glimpses are Barraqué's focus here; so are Broch's characteristic paradoxes (e.g., "noch nicht und doch schon"—not yet, and yet already) play a central role here.

As in the Concerto, the composer builds Chant après chant in seventeen phases but, in this case, after having completed the main structure, Barraqué added an additional opening section, ending with a cadenza for the piano and a first vocal line. The first phase occupies nearly a quarter of the total duration, and half of the work has elapsed by the time the fifth phase has finished. The second half of the work, therefore, hurries through the remaining twelve phases, sometimes presenting two simultaneously. Barraqué uses a rhythmic series of seventeen cells, and for the pitched structure applies his technique of "proliferating series" to two source rows: the basic row for the Mort de Virgile cycle, and the row from his Piano Sonata.

== Discography ==
- Jean Barraqué: Séquence; Chant après chant. Josephine Nendick (soprano), Noël Lee (piano), and the Copenhagen Percussion Group, conducted by Tamás Vető. Recorded in the presence of the composer in Copenhagen, 20–23 December 1969. LP recording, 1 disc: 12 in., 33⅓ rpm, stereo. Valois MB 951. [France]: Valois, 1970. Reissued, Musical Heritage Society MHS 1282. [USA]: Musical Heritage Society, 1979. Reissued, Astrée AS 75, [France]: Astrée, 1983.
- Jean Barraqué: Œuvres complètes. Claudia Barainsky (soprano) and Klangforum Wien conducted by Peter Rundel. Recorded 16 January 1996, in the Casino Zögernitz, Vienna. CD recording, 3 discs: 12 cm, stereo. CPO 999 569-2. Musique française d'aujourd'hui. Georgsmarienhütte: Classic Produktion Osnabrück, 1998.
- Soli for Soprano with Percussion Orchestra. Jamie Jordan (soprano), Cory Holt Merenda (piano), McCormick Percussion Group, conducted by Robert McCormick. Recorded at Springs Theatre Recording Studio, Tampa, Florida. CD recording, 1 disc: 12 cm, stereo. Ravello 7884. North Hampton, New Hampshire: Ravello Records, 2014.
