= Berthe Kal =

French soprano and music educator

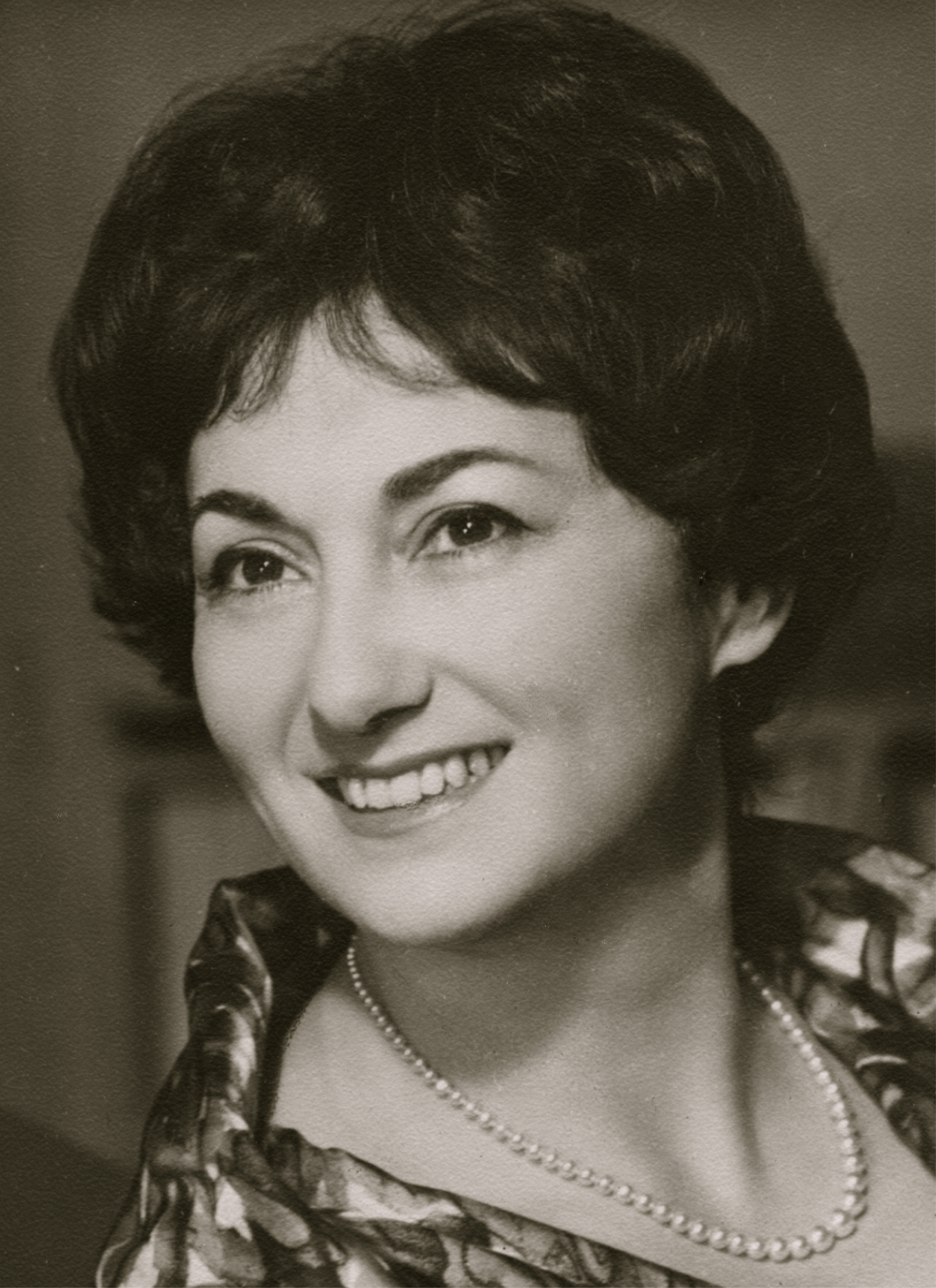
Berthe Kal

Berthe Dyck Kaleka called Kal (10 November 1913 – 25 April 2015) was a 20th-century French soprano and music educator.

== Biography ==
Born in Paris, Kal, daughter of Russian and Lithuanian immigrants, came to study music at the age of six, through piano and music theory.

Endowed with a great vocal ease and absolute pitch, she naturally turned to singing, which she practiced first in choir, in the Chorale Populaire de Paris.

It was only in 1948 that she took her first lessons, with Lise Daniels.

She then entered the Schola Cantorum de Paris to study harmony, counterpoint, and vocal technique with Irène Joachim later Jane Bathori.

From 1952, she was hired as soloist with the ORTF, to do most of her career there, participating in numerous musical programs (Plaisirs de la musique of Roland Manuel; Livre d'or on France Culture), concerts, and radio creations. She had the opportunity to perform under the direction of Pierre Boulez, Gilbert Amy, Charles Bruck, Pierre Capdevielle, Marius Constant, Bruno Maderna, Manuel Rosenthal, and Michel Plasson, among others.

Recommended by Jane Bathori, in 1957 she joined the "Société de musique d'autrefois" founded by Countess Geneviève Thibault de Chambure, for concerts under the direction of Yvonne Gouverné, until 1968.

From 1960 to 1965, she joined Vladimir Jankélévitch for a series of concerts-conferences in Paris, on musical romanticism in Russia, within the framework of the conferences Connaissance de l'URSS organised by the Association France-URSS. These Causerie(s) were the opportunity for the philosopher to illustrate himself at the piano.

Kal met Nadia Boulanger in 1961, during a concert in Nice for Prince Rainier of Monaco, then took part, in 1964, in lessons of musical interpretation of Mozart's works in her apartment of the rue Ballu (9th arrondissement of Paris). The same year, Nadia Boulanger invited her to give two recitals of French melodies at the Fondation Singer-Polignac, then at the Fontainebleau Schools.

Known for her qualities as a reader, she was regularly asked by Manuel Rosenthal, then professor of conducting class at the Conservatoire de Paris, to participate from 1962 to 1968 in the Prix de Rome composition class, thus familiarizing herself with a great diversity of musical languages.

As Jesus Aguila points out, Berthe Kal is one of the few specialists of the contemporary repertoire of the 1960s; she belongs to the circle of singers such as Cathy Berberian, Helga Pilarczyk, Ethel Semser, Marie-Thérèse Cahn, who participate in the creations of the Domaine musical.

She also collaborated with composer Georges Delerue for film music, and made an appearance in Promise at Dawn (1970) by Jules Dassin.

Berthe Kal died in Paris at age 101.

== Awards ==
- 1957: Prix Maurice Ravel de la Mélodie française
- 1963: Prix Mozart du concours de l'UFAM

== Premieres ==
Non-exhaustive list

Jacques Castérède La Cour des miracles, 1956. Orchestre de la RTF, direction: Tony Aubin

Germaine Tailleferre La petite sirène (la Reine de la mer) chamber opera in three acts, on 30 September 1960 at Paris, salle Érard, by the Orchestre lyrique de la RTF. Conducting: Pierre-Michel Le Conte.

Max Pinchard Trois Chorals Du Signe De La Croix pour 4 voix mixtes, sur des poèmes de Gérard Murail, on 16 March 1961, ORTF

Paul Méfano Paraboles, 1965, Domaine musical. Direction: Bruno Maderna

Betsy Jolas Dans la chaleur vacante, 26 January 1965. ORTF. Direction: Gilbert Amy

Jean-Jacques Werner Notes prises à New York, 19 May 1965, 1st audition à la Société Nationale de Musique, Salle Cortot. With Georges Delvallée as the pianist.

Edison Denisov Le Soleil des Incas, 24 November 1965. Création française du Domaine musical, au Théâtre de l'Odéon. Direction: Bruno Maderna

Jean Barraqué Chant après chant, 23–28 June 1966 at the Festival International de Strasbourg with André Krust as the pianist and Les Percussions de Strasbourg, Charles Bruck conducting

Darius Milhaud Hommage à Comenius op. 421, 15 November 1966, UNESCO. Direction: Manuel Rosenthal

Pierre Mariétan Récit suivi de Légende, pour voix de soprano et sept instruments, 25 January 1967 au Théâtre de l'Odéon. Direction: Andrzej Markowski

Jean-Jacques Werner L’oiseau inaugural, 22 May 1970 by the chamber orchestra of the ORTF. Direction: Jean-Jacques Werner

== Discography ==
- Bohuslav Martinů, Juliette ou la clé des songes (Le petit arabe). Orchestre lyrique de la RTF, direction: Charles Bruck. (Le Chant du Monde LDC 278995.96)
- Bohuslav Martinů, Alexandre bis (Philomène). Orchestre lyrique de la RTF, direction: Jean Doussard (Le Chant du Monde LDC 278994)
- François-Adrien Boïeldieu Ma tante Aurore, ou le Roman impromptu (Marton). Orchestre de chambre de la RTF, direction: Marcel Couraud. (Philips 456 655–2).
