= ... Au delà du hasard =

1958 music composition by Jean Barraqué

... Au delà du hasard (Beyond Chance, 1958–59) is a composition for two sopranos, one alto, and four instrumental groups by the French composer Jean Barraqué. It is the second part of an unfinished cycle of works on Hermann Broch's 1945 novel The Death of Virgil. Barraqué set his own text, based on a quotation from Albert Kohn's French translation of Broch's novel. A performance lasts about forty minutes.

== History ==
After completing the first draft of Le Temps restitué in December, 1957, Barraqué temporarily set aside his Mort de Virgile project in order to collaborate with Jean Thibaudeau and Jacques Polieri on two dramatic projects (Invitation au voyage and Echelle visuelle). The projects foundered, and Barraqué used some of the music he had composed for them in ... Au delà du hasard. The manuscript score was completed on 22 December 1959, and the composer later added a dedication to André Hodeir, on 12 June 1961. The work was first performed on 26 January 1960 on a concert of the Domaine Musical at the Théâtre de l'Odéon in Paris. The performers were Yvonne Loriod (piano), Ethel Semser, Marie-Thérèse Cahn, and Simone Codinas (vocalists), Hubert Rostaing (clarinet), the Jazz Groupe de Paris (musical director André Hodeir) and the Ensemble du Domaine Musical, all conducted by Pierre Boulez. The score was published in 1967 by Aldo Bruzzichelli in Florence.

== Analysis ==
The composer described ... Au delà du hasard as

a kind of multidimensional musical vision. Several movements are interrelated, appearing, reappearing, and vanishing, embodying the idea of strangeness and heterogeneity. The perpetual variation has to do with the notion of "musical oblivion." All parameters ... pitches, durations, register, timbre, set up a complete contradiction with the orchestration. The jazz group is conceived here as one block of sound among others, as a harmonic agglomeration.

The work is in thirteen movements, performed without a break:

1. "La Nuit sans rayons" (Night Without Rays)
2. "Incapables ..."
3. "Quelles Marques ..." (Such Marks ...)
4. "La Démesure" (The Excess)
5. "Dans la Multitude" (In the Throng)
6. "Instrumental 1"
7. "Pour la Lisière ..." (For the Margin ...)
8. "Instrumental 2"
9. "Avant la Citation" (Before the Quotation)
10. "Aveuglé par le Rêve" (Blinded by Dream)
11. "Instrumental 3"
12. "... au delà des droites Lignes" (Beyond Straight Lines)
13. "D'une Pensée sans nuit" (On a Thought without Night)

The score is prefaced by a quotation from Albert Kohn's translation of Broch:

Mais où tes courants multiples se croisent et vers un but convergent,
– un courant étant déterminé par l'autre. – c'est
là seulement que tu manifestes la stabilité,
l'objet et le nom d'une vérité terrestre, entr'unis,
appelés à l'unité, pour qu'ils soient ton miroir.

But where your multiple streams intersect and converge towards a goal,
– one stream being determined by the other. – it is
only there that you manifest stability,
the object and the name of an earthly truth, united,
called unity, in order to be your mirror.

This text deviates significantly in structure from Broch's German original, which is a quatrain in alternating hexameters and pentameters. The main text of the composition, written by Barraqué as a commentary on another citation from Broch, is in a style that recalls in places the techniques of French surrealism. The Broch quotation, arriving only in the tenth movement and after a noisy announcement by cymbals and gongs, is sung at first very quietly by the three singers, as if disclosing a secret: "Blinded by dream and made by dream to see, I know your death, I know the limit fixed for you, dream's limit, which you deny. Do you know it yourself? Do you want it so?".

Seamlessly weaving together excerpts from the Polieri-Thibaudeau scores with new material, Barraqué used his technique of proliferating series to obtain new tone rows from the one originally used for the theatre music:

C–F♯–A♭–F–B–E–E♭–G–A–B♭–D–C♯.

In this case, the method involved comparing the inversion of the row:

C–A♭–G–C♯–E–D–B♭– E♭–B–F–F♯–A

Observing that this is equivalent to permuting the original row in the order 1–3–8–12–6–11–10–7–5–4–2–9, applying the same permutation to the inverted row produced

C–G–E♭–A–D–F♯–F–B♭–E–C♯–G♯–B,

a row that includes three conventional triads: C minor (notes 1–3), D major (notes 4–6), and C♯ minor (notes 9–11). These chords, not chosen deliberately by the composer but engendered "automatically" by the method, gave Barraqué "serial permission to re-encounter elements of the tonal past, as figures in a dream".

== Discography ==
- Irène Jarsky (soprano), Catherine Gayer(soprano), Anne Bartelloni (contralto), Ensemble 2E 2M, conducted by Paul Méfano. Recorded at IRCAM, Paris, September 1979. LP recording, 1 disc: 33 1/3 rpm, stereo, 12 in. Astrée AS 50. Musique franc̜aise d'aujourd'hui. France: Astrée, 1981.
- Jean Barraqué: Œuvres complètes. Julie Moffat, Deborah Miles-Johnson, and Christina Ascher (voices), Florian Müller (piano), Bernhard Zachhuber (clarinet), and Klangforum Wien conducted by Jürg Wyttenbach. Recorded 17–19 February 1995, in the Konzerthaus Mozartsaal, Vienna. CD recording, 3 discs: 12 cm, stereo. CPO 999 569-2. Musique française d'aujourd'hui. Georgsmarienhütte: Classic Produktion Osnabrück, 1998.
- Wittener Tage für neue Kammermusik 1995 Dokumentation Live. Julie Moffat, Deborah Miles-Johnson, Christina Ascher (voices), and Klangforum Wien, conducted by Peter Rundel. Recorded 21–23 April 1995 at the Städtischen Saalbau and the Rudolf Steiner Schule in Witten, 1995. CD recording, 2 discs: 12 cm, stereo. Cologne: WDR; Witten: Kulturamt, 1995.
