= Royan Festival =

The Royan Festival (or more fully in French the Festival international d'art contemporain de Royan) was held in Royan, in the department of Charente-Maritime in the Nouvelle-Aquitaine region of southwest France from 1964 to 1977. It was a multi-disciplinary annual event, bringing together:

- an important contemporary music festival;
- dance performances;
- theater;
- movies;
- international exhibitions of photographic research;
- exhibitions of visual arts and arts of the East, the Far East and Africa.

Created in 1963 by Dr. Bernard Gachet, the festival was primarily focused on contemporary music. Its artistic director was Claude Samuel from 1964 to 1972 then Harry Halbreich from 1973 to 1977. The festival was held annually for one week around Easter. Soon, its musical production, the Festival de Royan became as famous as those of Donaueschingen and Venice.

The Olivier Messiaen international piano competition was part of the festival until 1971. In 1972, it was replaced by a flute competition.

== Publishing and principal creations ==
=== 1966 ===
- Triad of Gilbert Amy
- Interference of Paul Méfano
- De Natura Sonoris of Krzysztof Penderecki
- Terretektorh of Iannis Xenakis
- Variations for Orchestra of Igor Stravinsky

=== 1967 ===
- Archipelago I by André Boucourechliev
- On the opera travel by Betsy Jolas
- Dans le deuil des vagues I by Gérard Masson

=== 1968 ===
- Trajectoires by Gilbert Amy
- Le Temps restitué by Jean Barraqué
- Lines by Paul Méfano
- Imaginario II by Luis de Pablo
- Punkte by Karlheinz Stockhausen
- Solo by Franco Donatoni
- Nuits by Iannis Xenakis

=== 1969 ===
- Sinfonia by Berio
- Archipelago II by Boucourechliev
- Polychrome Reliefs by Jean-Pierre Guézec
- Quadrivium by Bruno Maderna
- Nomos Gamma by Xenakis

=== 1970 ===
- Cette étoile enseigne à s'incliner by Gilbert Amy
- Archipelago IV by André Boucourechliev
- Fourteen Stations by Marius Constant
- Ceremony II by Pierre Henry
- Holidays Symphony by Charles Ives
- The Ceremony by Paul Méfano

=== 1971 ===
The theme this year was the contemporary music of Eastern Europe.

- Schichten, by Carlos Roqué Alsina
- Austrahlungen, by Vinko Globokar
- Screen, by Anatol Vieru
- Synaphaï, by Iannis Xenakis.

It was also the year that created the international exhibition of photographic research (SIRP).

=== 1972 ===
The edition was devoted mainly to the "younger generation".

- Ludwig Van by Mauricio Kagel
- Madrigal by Paul Méfano
- Lovecraft by Tristan Murail

=== 1973 ===
- Solo by Franco Donatoni
- Isoritmi by Giuseppe Sinopoli (April 16)
- Preludes and Fugue for Witold Lutoslawski
- Kermit by François-Bernard Mâche
- Blue far from Gérard Masson
- Extensions of Francis Miroglio
- 24 Preludes of Maurice Ohana
- Cello Concerto by Penderecki
- Choralvorspiele by Dieter Schnebel
- Photoptosis and Ecclesiastical Action by Bernd Alois Zimmermann

=== 1974 ===
That year, no fewer than 49 composers (including 15 born after 1940) are found in Royan, 18 different nationalities. Cent creations will be produced during a week.

- Clocks and Clouds by György Ligeti
- Symphony of René Koering
- The Drift of the Continents by Tristan Murail
- Missa brevis and Sieben Sterne of Brian Ferneyhough
- Shanti by Jean-Claude Eloy
- Melodies of Paul Méfano
- Tenebrae by Klaus Huber
- Bergkristall by Sylvano Bussotti
- Aura by Bruno Maderna
- On Mi by Boesmans
- Quartet of René Koering
- Quartet of Gérard Masson

=== 1975 ===
- Sonatas for String Quartet and Transit by Brian Ferneyhough;
- Quartet by Heinz Holliger;
- Sands by Tristan Murail;
- Memories to the memory of Giuseppe Sinopoli;
- Lamento di Gesu by Radulescu;
- Espressivo by Franco Donatoni;
- Pinturas Negras and Tiempo para espacios by Cristobal Halffter;
- Puzzle by Philippe Manoury;
- Threnody by Boucourechliev;
- Down to a Sunless Sea by Hugues Dufour;
- Musik im Bauch by Karlheinz Stockhausen .

=== 1976 ===
- Requiem Hashshirim by Giuseppe Sinopoli (mars 25) NDR Chorale
- Waves of Paul Méfano;
- Ecce Opus by Francisco Guerrero;
- Cello Concerto by Cristobal Halffter;
- Cello Concerto in Isang Yun;
- III intervals of Boesmans;
- Sinfonie of Friedrich Cerha .

=== 1977 ===
- The Storm and Erewhon by Hugues Dufourt
- Symphony by Jacques Lenot
- Lichtzwang by Wolfgang Rihm
- Symphony No. 3 by Henryk Górecki
- Ruf by Emmanuel Nunes

== Bibliography ==
- Festival international d'art contemporain de Royan 1964-1977 - Henri Besancon, Ed. Bonne Anse, 158 pages, 2007
