= Claude Helffer =

French pianist (1922–2004)

- Born: 18 June 1922; Paris, France
- Died: 27 October 2004 (aged 82); Paris, France
- Education: École Polytechnique
- Spouse: Mireille Helffer (m. 1946)

Claude Helffer (18 June 1922 – 27 October 2004) was a French pianist.

== Early life ==
Helffer was born in Paris, and began piano lessons at the age of five. From the age of ten, until the outbreak of World War II, he studied with Robert Casadesus. During the war, he entered École Polytechnique and fought for the French Resistance during World War II. After the war, he studied theory and composition with René Leibowitz.

== Career ==
He made his debut in Paris in 1948 and from 1954 appeared regularly in the concerts of the Domaine musical.

Helffer gave many premières of new works and was the dedicatee of several notable works, including Erikhthon (Xenakis, 1974), Concerto (Boucourechliev, 1975), Stances (Betsy Jolas, 1978), Concerto no. 1 (Luis de Pablo, 1980), Envoi (Gilles Tremblay, 1982), and Modifications (Michael Jarrell, 1983). Conductors he collaborated with included Boulez, Bour, Gielen, Leibowitz, Maderna, Marriner, Martinon, van Otterloo, Prêtre and Scherchen. His discography includes the complete piano music of Schoenberg (Grand Prix du Disque), Debussy and Ravel and the Sonatas of Boulez, Berg and Barraqué.

Helffer taught master classes all over the world, most notably at the Salzburg Summer Academy from 1985 to 1998.

== Personal life ==
Helffer married noted ethnomusicologist Mireille Helffer. They met at the Lycée Molière two years prior (June 1946).

== Discography ==
- Barraqué: Piano Sonata (recorded 1969). Astrée (LP)
- Bartók: Out of Doors, Piano Sonata, Popular Romanian Dances, Suite op. 14, Improvisations op. 20. Harmonia Mundi (CD)
- Bartók: Mikrokosmos. Harmonia Mundi (LP/CD)
- Bartók: Piano sonata. Debussy: 3 Etudes. Evangelisti: Due proiezioni sonore. Serocki: A piacere. RCA Red Seal (LP)
- Boulez: Piano Sonata No. 2. Berg: Piano Sonata. Deutsche Grammophon (LP)
- Boulez: Piano Sonatas Nos. 1–3. Astrée (LP/CD)
- Debussy: Complete Works for Solo Piano. Harmonia Mundi (LP/CD)
- René Leibowitz: 3 Pièces pour piano op.19. Divox (CD)
- Milhaud: Piano Concertos Nos. 1 & 4, Le Carnaval d’Aix, 5 Etudes, Ballade. Orchestre National cond. D. Robertson. Erato (CD)
- Ravel: Complete Works for Solo Piano. Harmonia Mundi (LP/CD, 2 vols.)
- Roussel: Piano Concerto. Omega (LP)
- Schoenberg: Piano Concerto op.42 (recorded c.1952). Orchestre Radio-Symphonique de Paris cond. René Leibowitz.

Renaissance/Period/Counterpoint (LP)

- Schoenberg: Complete Works for Solo Piano (recorded c.1968). Harmonia Mundi (LP/CD)
- Schoenberg: Complete Works for Solo Piano (recorded 2000). Pianovox (CD)
- Xenakis: Mists, Herma, A r., Akea, Dikhtas, Evryali, chamber works. Irvine Arditti (violin); Arditti Quartet. Astrée Auvidis (2 CDs)

== Bibliography ==
- Albèra, Philippe, Entretiens avec Claude Helffer, 1995 (Editions Contrechamps)
- Helffer, Claude and Michaud-Pradeilles, Catherine, Le Piano, 1997 (Presses universitaires de France: Que sais-je?)
- Helffer, Claude, Quinze analyses musicales, de Bach à Manoury, 2000 (Editions Contrechamps)
- Claude Helffer: La musique sur le bout des doigts: Entretien avec Bruno Serrou, 2005 (Michel de Maule/Institut national de l'audiovisuel, with DVD-ROM)
