= Hubert Rostaing =

French musician (1918–1990)

Hubert Rostaing (17 September 1918 – 10 June 1990) was a French jazz clarinetist and tenor saxophonist. Born in Lyon, he grew up in Algiers, where he learned to play clarinet and saxophone. After moving to Paris, Rostaing took the place of Stéphane Grappelli in Django Reinhardt's Quintette du Hot Club de France and performed with them on and off from 1940 to 1948. Roastaing then worked as a bandleader, performing in collaboration with André Hodeir, among others. Outside jazz, he also performed rock and roll and classical music. In the last part of his life, he worked as a composer, arranger, orchestrator, conductor and music director on 53 films and television series before his death from liver cancer in Paris.

== Early life ==
Rostaing was born in Lyon on 17 September 1918 and moved to Algiers with his family in his youth. While there, he was a student at the local conservatory of music and played clarinet and saxophone at local venues as a teenager with the Red Hotters. He later performed on some tours of North Africa, visiting Morocco and Tunisia. After a 1938 tour of Luxembourg, Rostaing moved to Paris, wishing to perform at nightclubs at the Place Pigalle. He went to Lille and returned to Algiers for a while but moved back to Paris in 1940 to perform cabaret on the Champs-Elysées.

== Career ==
Django Reinhardt's Quintette du Hot Club de France was performing in England around this time, which coincided with the advent of the Second World War. After Reinhardt and the other members decided to return to France, Stéphane Grappelli stayed in London; missing a member, Reinhardt first asked Alix Combelle to join them, but he declined after finding another job. Combelle instead passed on Rostaing's name, who joined the quintet. He originally performed on saxophone, but switched to clarinet. While his early playing suffered from a lack of experience, Rostaing practiced hard, and by 1944 he would be named the best clarinetist of the Hot Club in a survey. His playing was influenced by the style of Benny Goodman.

Rostaing continued to perform on-and-off with Reinhardt until 1948. During his time with the quintet, he had begun to make recordings as a bandleader, collaborating with performers such as Raymond Legrand, Aimé Barelli, Harry Cooper, Jacques Hélian, and Rex Stewart. Another partnership was formed with André Hodeir: Rostaing performed on several of his scores, including Autour d’un Récif (1949) and Saint-Tropez (1953). Demonstrating his range, he would also perform rock and roll under several pseudonyms (Earl Cadillac, Dick Rasurell, and Joe Kalamazoo), and classical music, including the world premiere of Jean Barraqué's Concerto (which he was one of the dedicatees of) with the BBC Symphony Orchestra.

From 1956 until his death, Rostaing worked as a composer, arranger, orchestrator, conductor and music director. He worked on a total of 53 films and television series, such as Naughty Girl (1956), Where Is Parsifal? (1984), and Eye of the Widow (1991).

== Death and legacy ==
Rostaing died of liver cancer in Paris on 10 June 1990. Writing on his legacy in The Clarinet, Jesse Krebs said that he left an "important legacy of collaboration with Django Reinhardt", and "deserves appreciation and recognition for the versatility and impact of his tremendous career".

== See also ==
- Candide ou l'optimisme au XXe siècle (1960)
