= Concerto (Barraqué) =

Composition by Jean Barraqué

The Concerto for six instrumental formations and two solo instruments (vibraphone and clarinet) is a work composed by Jean Barraqué, started in 1962 and finished in 1968.

== History ==
The initial impulse to write the Concerto came when Pierre Boulez wrote to Barraqué asking for a new work for the Domaine musical's 1962–63 season. Barraqué wrote back, suggesting the Concerto, and he began composing it on Easter Monday, 23 April 1962. He did not finish it at that time, however. He resumed work in the summer of 1968 in Perros-Guirec, and completed the score in Florence on 22 October of the same year. It was premiered on 20 November 1968 at the Royal Festival Hall in London, by Hubert Rostaing (clarinet), Tristan Fry (vibraphone), and the BBC Symphony Orchestra conducted by Gilbert Amy. The manuscript score was dedicated on 20 March 1969 to Claude and Hubert Rostaing.

== Instrumentation ==
There are two solo instruments, clarinet and vibraphone, accompanied by six instrumental formations, each containing one stringed instrument, one woodwind, and one brass:

1. Violin, bassoon, trumpet
2. Viola, cor anglais, trombone
3. Cello, alto flute, tenor saxophone
4. Harp, bass clarinet, baritone saxophone
5. Amplified harpsichord, oboe, horn
6. Amplified guitar, flute, alto saxophone

== Character ==
The manuscript title page includes several mottos and inscriptions indicating the formal character and intended poetic atmosphere. One of these is an abbreviated form of the "Affranchi du hasard" quotation found in the printed score of Barraqué's ... Au delà du hasard (1958–59): "the many currents cross / ... towards one convergent point / united among themselves they are the mirrors". One of the other inscriptions indicates Schubert as a spiritual influence: "because of a smile, for a sadness, for a very gentle memory towards Schubert".

== Structure ==
The Concerto consists of seventeen sequences grouped in six sections, which are played without interruption.

The instrumental families are called upon to regroup independently of the formations. The writing is as for a soloist, for soloists, for groups of soloists, for orchestral groups and for the entire orchestral ensemble. Passages from one to another can be long or short, abrupt.

Its scoring resembles that of Pierre Boulez's Domaines, which was begun in 1961 and premiered in the same year as the Concerto, but while Boulez keeps his six instrumental groups as distinct as possible, Barraqué's flow together into an orchestra. Boulez also projects a regular series of twelve alternations between his soloist and each instrumental group, whereas Barraqué's work is continuous.

== Discography ==
- Jean Barraqué: Concerto; Le Temps restitué. Rémi Lerner (clarinet), unnamed vibraphonist, and Ensemble 2e2m conducted by Paul Méfano. Recorded January 1987 at Studio 103, Radio France. CD recording, 1 disc: 12 cm, stereo. Harmonia Mundi 905199. Arles: Harmonia Mundi, 1987.
- Jean Barraqué: Œuvres complètes. Ernesto Molinari (clarinet), Charlie Fischer (vibraphone) and Klangforum Wien conducted by Sylvain Cambreling. Concerto recorded 15–16 February 1995, in the Konzerthaus Mozartsaal, Vienna. CD recording, 3 discs: 12 cm, stereo. CPO 999 569-2. Musique française d'aujourd'hui. Georgsmarienhütte: Classic Produktion Osnabrück, 1998.
