= The Death of Virgil =

1945 novel by Hermann Broch

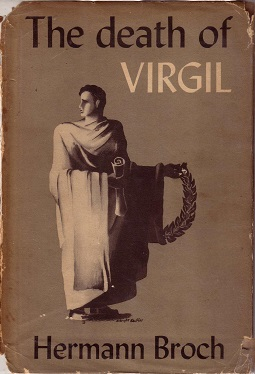
- First edition of English translation
- Author: Hermann Broch
- Original title: Der Tod des Virgil
- Language: German
- Genre: Historical novel
- Publisher: Pantheon Books
- Publication date: 1945
- Publication place: Austria
- Media type: Print (Hardback & Paperback)
- Pages: 494 pp (first edition hardcover)
- ISBN: 1-117-57202-1 (first edition hardcover)

The Death of Virgil (German: Der Tod des Vergil) is a 1945 novel by the Austrian author Hermann Broch. The narrative imagines the last hours of life of the Roman poet Virgil, in the port of Brundisium (Brindisi), whence he had accompanied the emperor Augustus, his decision – frustrated by the emperor – to burn his Aeneid, and his final reconciliation with his destiny. Virgil's heightened perceptions as he dies recall his life and the age in which he lives.

The novel examines the relationship between poetry and life, especially poetry and politics, taking a critical view of the value of literature in times of upheaval. Heavily influenced by the structure and interior monologue of James Joyce's Ulysses, the novel also can be read as criticizing the narcissism of artists' self-reflection.

Broch began the novel during the rise of the Nazi Party, writing part of it while imprisoned after the Anschluss. After his emigration to the US, it was published in German and English simultaneously in 1945. Despite a reputation as a challenging book, the novel has been included in several lists of the best novels of all time and inspired a cycle of orchestral works by Jean Barraqué.

== Plot ==
The novel is divided into 4 parts, describing the final 18 hours of Virgil's life.

1: Arrival: Virgil arrives in the port city of Brundisium, gravely ill. He reflects on the might of the imperial fleet as it contrasts with his own weakness and the court's growing decadence. As he is carried through the city, he is overwhelmed by the crude chaos of the people in its streets.

2. Descent: Virgil reflects on his past, realizing that he has always prioritized aesthetic beauty over human relationships. He particularly feels a burning regret for writing his epic poem the Aeneid, which he now feels promotes imperial power and imperial lies. He decides to have the poem burned.

3. Expectation: As Virgil approaches death, he experiences visions that blur myth and reality. Emperor Augustus persuades Virgil to preserve the manuscript, if the emperor agrees to free his slaves.

4. Return: Virgil continues to have mystic visions in which he reconciles opposing forces in his life, such as ugliness and beauty. Accepting his death, he has a vision of himself embarking on an ocean voyage.

== Writing process and publication ==
Broch started to write the novel in 1936, worked on a second version in 1938 – to some extent while imprisoned in Bad Aussee for three weeks – and finished it in the United States (1940-1945). One obituary later described the novel as started "as a private preparation for death, and with no thought of a public". The stream of consciousness and complex literary allusions in the novel were influenced by the modernist style of James Joyce. The first edition was an English translation by American poet Jean Starr Untermeyer, who was also Broch's lover. The pair collaborated closely and often contentiously, though both were pleased with the results. Given the complexity of the project, critic George Peters has called Untermeyer's resulting work "a landmark in the annals of modern literary translation".

Pantheon Books of New York City published the book simultaneously in its original German as well as its English translation by Jean Starr Untermeyer in June 1945. George F. Peters states that Broch had continued to work on the text after the English translation went to press in December 1944, resulting in some slight differences. A German language edition was also published in Zürich by Rhein Verlag in 1947, but the first publication in Germany was not until 1958 when editions were published in Frankfurt and Munich (the latter with colour illustrations by Celestino Piatti). Vintage Books released it as an ebook on January 12, 2012.

== Reception and influence ==
In a 1946 review in Commentary, critic Paul Goodman said that the novel's "main 'obvious' failing is that it seems to have so many words and so little content, so much philosophy and so little novelty or subtlety of thought", but also noted that the novel had a unique style that made it hard to assess its value fairly on a single reading. Marguerite Young, in a more positive review for the New York Times, compared the book's idiosyncratic style to Herman Melville's Moby-Dick, stating that it "fits into no pigeonhole, no category, is not one diamond but a mountain of diamonds". In 1974, another Times critic called it "one of the most exasperatingly tedious great works in any language".

German philosopher Hannah Arendt, a friend of Broch's, gave the novel a rave review in The Nation in 1946, arguing that the novel captured the sense of "no longer and not yet" experienced at great historical turning points; in 1949, she called it "one of the truly great works in German literature ... unique in its kind." One critic has argued it may have influenced Arendt's 1963 book On Revolution.

Yale critic Harold Bloom included Death of Virgil in his 1994 book The Western Canon, along with Broch's The Sleepwalkers and Hugo von Hofmannsthal and His Time. In 2009, The Guardian named Death of Virgil one of its list of "1000 novels everyone must read". The novel was also included in the list of 1001 Books You Must Read Before You Die (2006).

The French composer Jean Barraqué was deeply inspired by The Death of Virgil and spent 18 years composing a cycle of pieces based on it, uncompleted at the time of his 1973 death. The completed pieces include ... Au delà du hasard (1958-59), Chant après chant (1966), and Le Temps restitué (1968). Broch's novel was also admired by Czech author Milan Kundera, who cited it approvingly as an example of an "archnovel" that celebrates the non-serious and resists rigid ideology. Norwegian author Karl Ove Knausgård discusses the novel's ending in the sixth book of My Struggle, calling one passage the finest sentence by a European author in centuries.

== Interpretation ==
Some scholars have interpreted the book as an anti-Nazi novel. Virgil's fear that his writing will only serve to encourage autocratic repression is seen as a direct result of the Nazi Party's interest in and inspiration from classical sources.

Other interpreters have seen the novel as a more general statement that "poetry is immoral in an age of decline". Scholar Erich Heller describes the novel as a problematic masterpiece that "attempts to give literary shape to the author's growing aversion to literature". Just as Virgil wishes his Aeneid destroyed because it is "poetry" rather than practical knowledge, Broch had come to see literature as "the domain of vanity and mendacity". Paul Barlosky argues that the novel reflects a general trend among modernists of bemoaning the limitations and inadequacies of art, comparing its Virgil to other self-doubting artists in works like Marcel Proust's In Search of Lost Time and Max Beerbohm's "Enoch Soames".

Numerous critics have noted the influence of James Joyce's Ulysses on Broch's stream of consciousness style as well as the focus on a single day in the life of one man. Jean-Michel Rabaté interprets the novel as a response to Ulysses that both adopts Joyce's stylistic innovations while critiquing the "narcissism" of an author using literature for self-exploration, as Broch believed Joyce did. Broch himself once stated that the two books were no more similar than "a dachshund and a crocodile."

== Editions ==
- Broch, Hermann. Untermeyer, Jean Starr (tr.) The Death of Virgil (New York: Pantheon, 1945)
- Broch, Hermann. Der Tod des Vergil (New York: Pantheon, 1945)
- Broch, Hermann. Untermeyer, Jean Starr (tr.) The Death of Virgil (London: Routledge, 1946)
- Broch, Hermann. Der Tod des Vergil (Zürich: Rhein, 1947)
- Broch, Hermann. Der Tod des Vergil (Frankfurt: Suhrkamp, 1958)
- Broch, Hermann. Piatti, Celestino. Der Tod des Vergil (Munich: Deutscher Taschenbuch, 1958)
- Broch, Hermann. Untermeyer, Jean Starr (tr.) The Death of Virgil (London/New York: Penguin, 2000)
