= Carlos Roqué Alsina =

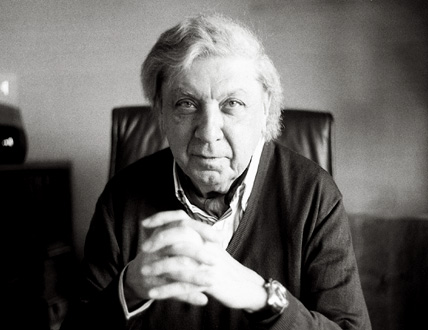
Carlos Roqué Alsina in 2014

Carlos Roqué Alsina (19 February 1941 – 5 August 2023) was a French composer and pianist of Argentinian origin.

== Biography ==
Alsina was born in Buenos Aires. His career as a pianist began at the age of six. He gave numerous concerts first in Latin America, then in North America and finally in Europe, some under the direction of prestigious conductors: Gilbert Amy, Ernest Bour, Semyon Bychkov, Jascha Horenstein, Otto Klemperer, Manuel Rosenthal, Michel Tabachnik, among others. At the same time, he studied musical composition on his own, writing his first piece at the age of fourteen.

In Argentina, he actively participated as a pianist and composer in artistic programs of various musical institutions (including "Nueva Musica" in Buenos Aires from 1959 to 1964).

In 1964, he was invited to Germany as part of the "Artists-in-Residence" program, which gave him the opportunity to meet Iannis Xenakis, Elliott Carter and Luciano Berio. In 1965, his composition Funktionen was premiered in Darmstadt under the direction of Bruno Maderna, of whom he became the assistant to the Deutsche Oper Berlin the following year.

In 1967, a New York period began, participating in the Center of Creative and Performing Arts in New York, leading numerous master classes on contemporary piano at the University at Buffalo. He also worked at the Juilliard School in 1969 as a visiting professor. During this period, he experimented with musical theatre (see the "Trio" of 1967 for cello, trombone and percussion).

In April 1969, with Jean-Pierre Drouet, Michel Portal, and Vinko Globokar, he founded the improvisation group "New Phonic Art", which led him to give numerous concerts and to make multiple international tours.

In 1972, he settled in France.

Since 1978, in parallel to his activities as pianist and composer he has devoted himself to teaching (he has taught piano at the Conservatoire national supérieur musique et danse de Lyon for nine years) and also teaches as a guest professor in several European institutions.

To honour his 60th birthday (2001) and his contribution to French musical life, he received a special commission from the Ministère de la Culture: Phares et Rayonnements. This anniversary was also the occasion for numerous portrait concerts celebrating his multiple career.

Alsina continued to exercise his activities as a pianist, teacher and composer: recitals, master classes and productions of his works punctuate his last years and led him to many trips in Europe, North America but also in China, Argentina etc.

== Works ==
To date, he has written more than 110 works (the majority of which have been commissioned by musical institutions) - including several for large orchestra, performed at most international contemporary music festivals (Berlin, Hamburg, Donaueschingen, Darmstadt, Vienna, Tanglewood, Amsterdam, Paris, Royan, Metz, Lille, Venice, etc.)..

- First Piano Study (Op.3)
- Second Piano Study (Op.6)
- Third Klavierstück for piano (Op.8) (1963–65)
- Funktionen (1965)
- Concerto for piano and orchestra (1965)
- Auftrag (1967)
- Überwindung (1967), commission of the Südwestfunk radio premiered in Donaueschingen conducted by Ernest Bour.
- Schichten for instrumental ensemble (1971)
- Study for tonbak (1973)
- A Letter (1976)
- Cantate (1977)
- La Muraille (1981)
- Prima Sinfonia (1983)
- Undici (1987)
- Suite indirecte for chamber orchestra (1989)
- Fantaisie for clarinet and orchestra (1991)
- Symphonie n° 2 (1992) for large orchestra, commissioned by the Orchestre de Paris on the occasion of his 50th anniversary, premiered under the direction of Semyon Bychkov.
- Pénombres (1993) for choir, children's choir and orchestra to a text by Claire Billot
- Concerto en deux mouvements (1999) for wind quintet and orchestra
- Phares et Rayonnements (2001), for tape and three instrumentists
- Concertino (2002) for piano and 12 instruments
- Reflet (2002) for solo vibraphone
- Reflets en trio (2002) for vibraphone, djembé and marimba
- Bel Canto (2009)

== Distinctions ==
- 1971: Guggenheim Prize for his works Überwindung and Schichten ("Official website". Archived from the original on 2013-05-07.).
- 1986: Officer of the Ordre des Arts et des Lettres
- 2004: the Académie des beaux-arts awards him the Paul-Louis Weiller Composition Prize for his work as a whole.
