= Le Temps restitué =

Le Temps restitué (Time Regiven) is a work for mezzo-soprano solo, choir, and orchestra by the French composer Jean Barraqué. It was both the first part to have been begun and the last one to be completed in his projected but unfinished cycle of works based on Hermann Broch's novel, The Death of Virgil. A performance lasts about forty minutes.

== History ==
In March 1956, Barraqué first formed a plan to set passages, in the French translation by Albert Kohn, from the second book ("Fire—The Descent") of Hermann Broch's novel The Death of Virgil, and straightaway began composing Le Temps restitué. He finished a first draft in Paris on 20 October 1957, and then added a new beginning and cover page dated 11 December of the same year. In this respect, it forms the basis for all the subsequent works in the cycle. He then devised a revised plan for the second book, which included details of the intended orchestration of Le Temps restitué, but set aside the draft in favour of other projects. It was only in the summer of 1967 that the offer of a performance at next year's Royan Festival rekindled Barraqué's interest and he resumed work on the score, completing it in Florence on 8 February 1968. The first performance took place on 4 April 1968, as part of the Royan Festival. Helga Pilarczyk was the soprano soloist, with members of the French Radio Choir (prepared by Jean-Paul Kréder) and the Ensemble du Domaine Musical, conducted by Gilbert Amy. The same forces gave the first Paris performance at a Domaine musical concert in the Théâtre de l'Odéon on 25 April 1968. There was only one further performance during the composer's lifetime, on 9 April 1973, at the Maison de l'O.R.T.F. in Paris with Anne Bartelloni (soprano), the French Radio chamber choir (using three voices on a part instead of twelve soloists), and the Ars Nova ensemble, conducted by Jean-Paul Kréder. The third performance was the US premiere, and took place on 10 August 1978 at the Tanglewood Music Festival in Lenox, Massachusetts, with the Berkshire Music Center Orchestra conducted by Gunther Schuller.

On 1 October 1970, Barraqué began what was meant to be a related work, titled Arraché de … commentaire en forme de lecture du Temps restitué, but it did not extend beyond a preliminary sketch for clarinets on three staves and the entry of an SATB chorus marked "Sprechstimme. Imprecise pitches but different in pitch register".

== Analysis ==
The work is in five movements, performed without a break:

1. "La loi et le temps" (Law and Time)
2. "Symbole de nuit" (Symbol of Night)
3. "Portail de la terreur" (Gate of Terror)
4. "L'inachèvement sans cesse" (Unceasing Incompletion)
5. "Car ce n'est que par l'erreur" (Because Only Amidst Error)

It is scored for solo mezzo-soprano, a choir of twelve solo singers, and an orchestra of twenty-eight players made up of roughly equal numbers of woodwinds, strings, and percussion. The text is taken from a passage in Broch's novel where Virgil, alone in his room, late at night, contemplates the stars from his window. It is a meditation on the marriage of law and time, of the inevitable and the unpredictable. It follows the linear arrangement of about six pages of Broch's text. The texts of the first, third, and fifth movements are three elegies in verse, taken without alteration from Broch's novel. The second and fourth movements intersperse lightly edited prose passages from Broch's surrounding narrative framework. Barraqué's omissions from the prose texts avoid many typical Brochian stylistic features in favour of its distinctive rhythm, retaining aspects of designation, assertion, and description. The syntax of the French translation permits Barraqué to end on the words "ouvert à la connaissance" (open to perception), which would not have been possible in the German original. In this way, "réconfort terrestre" (consolation in the earthly) becomes more important than the opening to perception.

The first movement opens with an orchestral introduction, followed by a four-voiced chorus in shifting tempos. The second movement is slower, with the solo soprano singing for the first time, against an orchestral accompaniment. The movement ends with the words "libérée du hasard" (freed from chance) which, in Broch's novel, lead directly into the second elegy. The third movement, setting this elegy, is longer and more complex, questioning how eternal truth is to be found within human mutability. The chorus sings four independent layers of text in twelve parts, "colliding and chaotic" (according to the score's instructions) against the soprano's cantabile, then adopts a more settled four-part texture to complete the movement as an aria with choral accompaniment. The fourth movement returns to the slower tempo and fragmented manner of the second movement, only now adding the chorus to the soprano and orchestra. It consists of two large sections of text setting, separated by a two-minute wordless interlude for chorus and orchestra. The concluding text once again ends with the words Broch uses to introduce the following elegiac verse “car ce n'est que dans l'erreur, ce n'est que par erreur” (because only amidst error, it is only through error). The final verse setting is slower still, though with constantly changing tempos. The soloist appears less often in this movement, while the choir is texturally more complex, at one point presenting twelve different lines of text simultaneously.

== Discography ==
- Jean Barraqué: Concerto; Le Temps restitué. Anne Bartelloni (mezzo-soprano), Groupe Vocal de France, and Ensemble 2e2m, conducted by Paul Méfano. Recorded January 1987 at Studio 103, Radio France. CD recording, 1 disc: 12 cm, stereo. Harmonia Mundi 905199. Arles: Harmonia Mundi, 1987.
- Jean Barraqué: Œuvres complètes. Rosemary Hardy (mezzo-soprano), Vokalensemble NOVA Wien (Colin Mason, chorus master), and Klangforum Wien conducted by Sylvain Cambreling. Recorded 20–21 September 1995, in the Mozartsaal, Konzerthaus, Vienna. CD recording, 3 discs: 12 cm, stereo. CPO 999 569-2. Musique française d'aujourd'hui. Georgsmarienhütte: Classic Produktion Osnabrück, 1998.
