= Jean Starr Untermeyer =

American poet (1886–1970)

- Born: March 13, 1886
- Died: July 12, 1970 (aged 84)

Jean Starr Untermeyer (March 13, 1886 – July 27, 1970) was an American poet, translator, and educator. She was the author of six volumes of poetry and a memoir. She was married to the poet Louis Untermeyer from 1906 to 1926.

== Biography ==
Starr was born into a well-off Jewish family in Zanesville, Ohio, the daughter of Abram Starr and Johanna Starr (née Schonfeld), the oldest of three siblings. Her maternal grandparents were immigrants from Germany. Her paternal grandmother was born in Schriesheim, Baden Württemberg, while her paternal grandfather was born in Heppenheim an der Bergstrasse, Hesse.

Starr was educated at Kohut College Preparatory School for Girls in New York City, and was trained to sing lieder and play the piano. She later entered Columbia University. While still in college, she met the poet Louis Untermeyer, whom she married, on January 23, 1907, without finishing her degree. In December of the same year the couple's son Richard was born.

=== Marriage and divorce ===
Through her marriage Jean Untermeyer came into contact with many poets and, especially inspired by hearing a reading of poems by Edna St. Vincent Millay, she began writing poetry privately. When her husband read her poems he was impressed by them and, on her behalf, submitted them to several magazines that accepted them for publication; with his support, her first book of poems, Growing Pains, was published by B. W. Huebsch in 1918. Huebsch also published her next book, Dreams Out of Darkness, in 1921.

Early on Untermeyer aspired to be a singer, and in 1924 made her debut in Berlin and Vienna singing Lieder. The performances were not well received, and she did not further pursue a musical career. She had traveled to Europe with her husband, and they then returned to the United States. They spent the summer of 1925 at the MacDowell artists' colony.

The Untermeyers divorced in 1926. In 1927 their son, Richard, who was 19 years old and in his sophomore year at Yale University, died by suicide in his room at school, with some suggesting at the time that his mother's letter about his debts played a role in his decision.

Jean and Louis Untermeyer reconciled several years later and remarried after Louis had been married and divorced a second time. They adopted two sons; however, they eventually separated again, with Louis agreeing to take custody of their sons, and the marriage ended once and for all in divorce, around 1933.

== Later work ==
Untermeyer continued to write poetry, publishing several further collections, including Winged Child (1936). Her poems are often traditional in form, with subtle, intricate harmonies; drawing inspiration from both nature and domestic life, they explore themes related to self-discipline and loss.

=== The Death of Virgil ===
Untermeyer visited the MacDowell Colony again in 1938. In 1939, during a stay at Yaddo, the writers' and artists' colony in Saratoga Springs, she met and began an affair with the German author Hermann Broch, with whom she struck up a complex collaboration. Broch asked her to begin translating his work in progress, Der Tod des Vergil (The Death of Virgil), in 1940, though he still hoped Willa and Edwin Muir, his previous English translators, would do the final translation. When the Muirs declined, Untermeyer became the official translator.

Broch and Untermeyer collaborated closely throughout the translation process, with Broch reviewing "every sentence and punctuation mark ... alternating between lavish praise and pedantic nitpicking". Though Broch was uncertain of his ability to properly evaluate the English translation, he nevertheless delivered frequent, harsh criticism that one critic describes as characteristic of the pair's "sado-masochistic" relationship. Broch continued to make changes to the German original until the last moment, requiring Untermeyer to quickly update her translation as well. Untermeyer's translation, The Death of Virgil, was published in 1945, simultaneously with the German edition. Critic George Peters has called the resulting work "a landmark in the annals of modern literary translation".

Thrilled with the results, Broch urged Untermeyer to pursue a further career in translation. However, Untermeyer, exhausted by the process, refused and returned to her own poetry.

=== Teaching ===
Untermeyer later taught at Olivet College, in Michigan, and at the New School for Social Research, in New York City.

== Works ==
=== Poetry collections ===
- Growing Pains (1918)
- Dreams Out of Darkness (1921)
- Steep Ascent (1927)
- The Winged Child (1936)
- Love and Need: Collected Poems, 1918–1940 (1940)
- Later Poems (1958)
- Job's Daughter (1967)

=== Memoir ===
- Private Collection (1965)

=== Translations ===
- Oscar Bie, Schubert, the Man (1928). Biography; translated from the German
- Hermann Broch, The Death of Virgil (1945). Novel; translated from the German
- Recreations (1970). Translations of poems from the French, German, and Hebrew
