= Pierre Monteux School =

Monteux School and Music Festival

Coordinates: 44°31′49″N 68°15′21″W

The Monteux School and Music Festival for conductors and orchestra musicians, founded by conductor Pierre Monteux, is a 6-week summer orchestra program located in Hancock, Maine, United States.

== History ==
Pierre Monteux's (1875–1964) first forays into teaching the art of conducting occurred in 1932 in Paris, where he taught a conducting course during the summer. In 1936, he moved his classes to Les Baux.

After marrying the American Doris Hodgkins, he moved permanently to the United States in 1942, maintaining residences in San Francisco and in his wife's home town, Hancock, Maine. It was in this rural community that he and Doris established what was first known as L'École Monteux, later to be known as the Domaine School, and finally, the Pierre Monteux School. In 2018, the name changed to the Monteux School and Music Festival.

After Monteux's death, Maestro Charles Bruck took over leadership of the school. In 1996, the summer of Bruck's passing, his protégé, Michael Jinbo, became the music director and Maestro of the School. After Maestro Jinbo died in 2022, his student Tiffany Lu became the interim and subsequent music director.

== Events ==
The Monteux School currently functions as both a school for conductors and orchestra musicians and a classical music festival for the surrounding community. The school is typically in session from mid-June through the end of July and offers a season of six orchestral concerts and five chamber music concerts. Student musicians come from conservatories and schools of music from around the world to study and perform in this setting.

== Philosophy ==
The school's philosophy is still heavily influenced by the life and musicianship of Pierre Monteux. As a young man, Monteux made his living as a violinist and violist in Paris's very active musical scene. His belief was that conductors must come from within the orchestra; as such, all conductors who attend the school must play in the orchestra.

Monteux's repertoire as a conductor was unusually broad for his era. Students at the Monteux School prepare a list of 60 orchestral works each summer, all of which are rehearsed or performed over the course of the six-week season. These range from Baroque/Early Classical through contemporary compositions.

== Traditions ==
The school is noteworthy for a number of long-standing traditions. Excerpts from The Rite of Spring are played every summer in honor of Pierre Monteux's famous association with that work's premiere in 1913. Bastille Day, the French national holiday, is celebrated with a rendition of La Marseillaise on the 14th of July, reflecting the school's cultural roots.

== Music directors ==
- Pierre Monteux (1943–1963)
- Charles Bruck (1964–1995)
- Michael Jinbo (1996–2022)
- Tiffany Lu (2024–present)

== Alumni ==
Notable alumni include Lorin Maazel, André Previn, Sir Neville Marriner, David Zinman, Erich Kunzel, Charles Ansbacher, David Hayes, George Cleve, Richard Yardumian, Anshel Brusilow, Hugh Wolff, Pierre Rolland, Ludovic Morlot, Werner Torkanowsky and the composer Robert Hall Lewis.

Leon Fleisher, a student in Hancock during the school's first two years, returned in the summer of 2010 to conduct and play an all-Mozart benefit concert.

Ludovic Morlot conducted Claude Debussy's Jeux (Games) on the Annual Memorial Concert during the 2018 summer season.

== Cultural references ==
David Katz, one of Charles Bruck's longtime students at the Monteux School, has written a one-man play about the conductor and the institution he headed for 26 years. In July 2005, to commemorate the 10th anniversary of Bruck's death, Katz premiered MUSE of FIRE at the Oceanside Meadows Theatre Barn in Prospect Harbor, Maine, and at the Acadia Repertory Theatre in Bar Harbor, both very close to where many of the events in the play took place. Katz has continued to tour the work, which highlights Bruck's intense and demanding teaching style, throughout the East, in Canada, and in an extended engagement in Chicago.

== See also ==
- Pierre Monteux
- Charles Bruck
