= André Boucourechliev =

French composer (1925–1997)

André Boucourechliev (28 July 1925 – 13 November 1997) was a French composer of Bulgarian origin.

Born in Sofia, Boucourechliev studied piano at the Conservatory there. Subsequently, he studied in Paris at the École Normale de Musique de Paris, where he later taught piano. His first attempts at composition date from 1954, when he was engaged in the famous contemporary music sessions at Darmstadt. He honed his compositional technique by seeking out Berio and Maderna in Milan. Following the success of his Piano Sonata (1959), which was performed at the Domaine musical, and works involving choice and chance, he spent a period in America, during which he met Cage, Merce Cunningham, and Rauschenberg. The summit of his exploration of choice and freedom on the part of the performer was reached in Archipels (1967–1971). Many of his later works have gone on to refine or extend these principles. Boucourechliev died in Paris in 1997 at the age of 72.

== Honours ==
- Grand Prix Musical de la Ville de Paris, 1976
- Grand Prix National de la Musique, 1984
- Commandeur des Arts et des Lettres
- Chevalier de la Légion d'honneur

== Works ==
Work	Opus No.	Scoring	Date	Medium	Publisher	Duration
Musique à trois	Op. 1	flute (also piccolo), clarinet and harpsichord	1957 rev. 1958	Chamber music	Unpublished	00:07:00
Texte I	Op. 2	tape (2 tracks)	1958	Electroacoustic music	Unpublished	00:06:20
Sonate	Op. 3	piano	1959	Solo instrument	Unpublished	00:10:00
Text II	Op. 4	two tapes	1959	Electroacoustic music	Unpublished	00:04:30
Grodek	Op. 5	soprano, flute and three percussions	1963	Vocal music	Universal	00:12:00
Musiques Nocturnes	Op. 6	clarinet, harp and piano	1965	Chamber music	Unpublished	00:10:00
Archipel 1	Op. 7	two pianos and two percussions (or two solo pianos)	1967	Chamber music	Universal	variable (approx. 11 mn)
Archipel 2	Op. 8	string quartet	1968	String quartet	Universal	variable (approx. 20 mn)
Archipel 3	Op. 9	piano and six percussions	1969	Percussion ensemble	Alphonse Leduc	variable (approx. 15 mn)
Archipel 4	Op. 10	Piano	1970	Solo instrument	Alphonse Leduc	variable (approx. 10–25 mn)
Anarchipel – Archipel 5E	Op. 11	one or two percussions	1970	Solo instrument	Alphonse Leduc	variable (approx. 7–20 mn)
Anarchipel – Archipel 5D	Op. 11	Piano	1970	Solo instrument	Alphonse Leduc	variable (approx. 7–20 mn)
Anarchipel – Archipel 5C	Op. 11	Organ	1970	Solo instrument	Alphonse Leduc	variable (approx. 7–20 mn)
Anarchipel – Archipel 5B	Op. 11	Harpsichord	1970	Solo instrument	Alphonse Leduc	variable (approx. 7–20 mn)
Anarchipel – Archipel 5A	Op. 11	one or two amplified harps	1970	Solo instrument	Alphonse Leduc	variable (approx. 7–20 mn)
Anarchipel	Op. 11	ensemble of six instruments : amplified harp, amplified harpsichord, organ, piano, 2 percussion	1970	Instrumental ensemble	Alphonse Leduc	variable (approx. 7–20 mn)
Ombres (Hommage à Beethoven)	Op. 12	twelve (or twenty-four) strings	1970	Orchestra	Alphonse Leduc	00:19:00
Tombeau	Op. 13	clarinet in A and percussion or piano	1971	Chamber music	Alphonse Leduc	00:04:00
Faces	Op. 14	two groupes of orchestra (with two conductors)	1972	Orchestra	Alphonse Leduc	variable (approx. 20 mn)
Amers	Op. 15	nineteen instruments	1973	Instrumental ensemble	Alphonse Leduc	variable (approx. 15–20 mn)
Thrène	Op. 16	tape	1974	Electroacoustic music		00:31:00
Concerto	Op. 17	piano and orchestra	1975	Orchestra	Salabert	variable (approx. 21 mn)
Six Etudes d’après Piranèse	Op. 18	Piano	1975	Solo instrument	Salabert	variable (approx. 15 mn)
Le nom d’Œdipe	Op. 19	6 soloists (Jocaste 1 soprano, Jocaste 2 speaker, Œdipe 1 baryton, Œdipe 2 s[...]	1978	Opera	Unpublished	02:00:00
Trois extraits du "Nom d’Œdipe"	Op. 20	soprano, piano, 2 gongs (played by the pianist) and tape	1978	Vocal music	Unpublished	00:14:00
Orion I	Op. 21	Organ	1979	Solo instrument	Salabert	variable (approx. 17 mn)
Ulysse	Op. 22	flute and percussion	1980	Chamber music	Transatlantiques	variable (approx. 12 mn)
Ulysse	Op. 22?	2 flutes	1980?	Chamber music	unpublished	variable (approx. 12 mn)
Orion II	Op. 23	five brasses, piano and two percussions	1982	Chamber music	Salabert	variable (approx. 20 mn)
Orion III	Op. 24	Piano	1982	Solo instrument	Salabert	00:10:00
Nocturnes	Op. 25	clarinet (in A and Bb) and piano	1984	Chamber music	Salabert	00:12:00
Lit de Neige	Op. 26	soprano and nineteen instruments	1984	Vocal music	Salabert	00:20:00
Le Miroir, Sept répliques pour un opéra possible	Op. 27	mezzo-soprano and orchestra	1987	Vocal music	Salabert	00:20:00
La chevelure de Bérénice	Op. 28	instrumental ensemble (20 players)	1987	Instrumental ensemble	Salabert	variable (approx. 20 mn)
Miroir 2 (Five pieces for string quartet)	Op. 29	string quartet	1989	String quartet	Salabert	00:18:00
Quatuor III	Op. 30	string quartet	1994	String quartet	Salabert	variable
Trois fragments de Michel-Ange	Op. 31	soprano, flute (and flute in G) and piano	1995	Vocal music	Salabert	00:07:30
Les Possédés			1971	Incidental music	Unpublished	00:07:00
Akara		tape	1967	Incidental music	Unpublished	00:20:00
Le repos du septième jour		3 flutes (also fl. in G and picc.) and 2 percussions	1965	Incidental music	Unpublished	00:27:00
Tic Tac		For tape (1 track)	1959	Incidental music		00:08:40
Ricercare		Organ		Early works	Unpublished	
Etude 1		tape (2 tracks)	1956	Early works	Unpublished	00:03:00
Escholier de merencolie		For solo voice	1956	Early works	Unpublished	
Trois pièces		Piano	1955	Early works	Unpublished	approx. 4 mn 30
Sonate		Violin	1953	Early works	Unpublished	approx. 7 mn
Quatre pièces		For violin and cello	1952	Early works	Unpublished	
Passacaglia		Piano	1952	Early works	Unpublished	approx. 5 mn
Signes		For flute, piano and two percussions	1961	Works withdrawn from the catalogue	Unpublished	approx. 11 mn
Les enfants de la nuit		For tape	1992	Incidental music		

== Writings ==
- Schumann, 1956 (French), 1959 (English), 2010 (Bulgarian)
- Chopin: eine Bildbiographie, 1962 (German), 1963 (English)
- Beethoven, 1963 (French)
- Stravinsky, 1982 (French), 1987 (English)
- Essai sur Beethoven, 1991
- Le langage musical, 1993
- Dire la musique, 1995
- Regards sur Chopin, 1996 (French), 2010 (Bulgarian)
- Debussy. La révolution subtile, 1998 (French),
