= James Miller (academic) =

American writer and academic (born 1947)

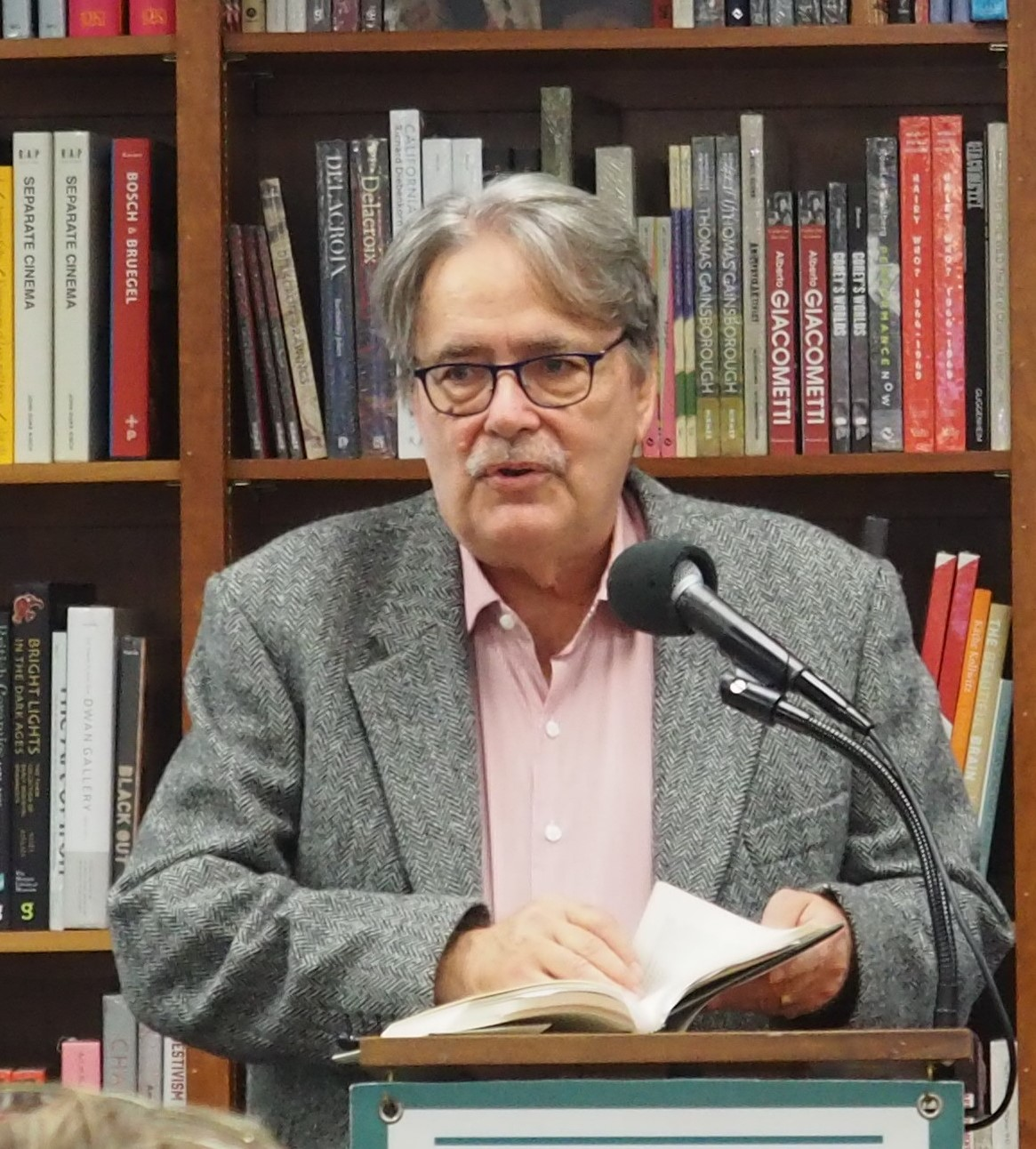
- Miller in 2018
- Born: 28 February 1947 (age 79)
- Education: Pomona College; Brandeis University
- Occupations: Writer, educator
- Writing career
- Subjects: History, philosophy, popular music

James Miller (born 1947) is an American writer and academic. He is known for writing about Michel Foucault, philosophy as a way of life, social movements, popular culture, intellectual history, eighteenth century to the present; radical social theory and history of political philosophy. He currently teaches at The New School.

== Biography ==
Born in 1947, James Miller was Chair of Liberal Studies at the New School for Social Research from 1992 until 2013. He is Professor of Politics and Liberal Studies at The New School. His most recent book, Examined Lives: From Socrates to Nietzsche, was published by Farrar, Straus and Giroux. He is the author of five other books: Flowers in the Dustbin: the Rise of Rock & Roll, 1947-1977, winner of an ASCAP-Deems Taylor award and a Ralph Gleason BMI award for best music book of 1999; The Passion of Michel Foucault (1993), an interpretive essay on the life of the French philosopher and a National Book Critics Circle Finalist for General Nonfiction, which has been translated into nine languages; Democracy is in the Streets: From Port Huron to the Siege of Chicago (1987), an account of the American student movement of the 1960s, also a National Book Critics Circle Finalist for General Nonfiction; Rousseau: Dreamer of Democracy (1984), a study of the origins of modern democracy; and History and Human Existence - From Marx to Merleau-Ponty, an analysis of Marx and the French existentialists.

The original editor of The Rolling Stone Illustrated History of Rock and Roll (1976), he has written about music since the 1960s, when one of his early record reviews appeared in the third issue of Rolling Stone magazine. Subsequent pieces on music have appeared in The New Republic, The New York Times and Newsweek, where he was a book reviewer and pop music critic between 1981 and 1990. Pieces on philosophy and history have appeared in The London Review of Books, The New York Times Book Review. In 2000, the magazine Lingua Franca published his best-known essay, Is Bad Writing Necessary? George Orwell, Theodor Adorno, and the Politics of Language.

Besides publishing in such peer-reviewed academic journals as History and Theory and Political Theory, he has contributed to a variety of reference works, from Encyclopædia Britannica and A New Literary History of America, published by Harvard in 2009, to the Dictionnaire de Philosophie Morale edited by Monique Canto-Sperber in 1996.

From 2000 to 2008, he edited Daedalus, the journal of the American Academy of Arts & Sciences. He has been a Guggenheim Fellow, an NEH Fellow twice, and in 2006-2007 he was a Fellow at the Dorothy and Lewis B. Cullman Center for Scholars and Writers at the New York Public Library. A native of Chicago, he was educated at Pomona College in California, and at Brandeis University, where he received a Ph.D. in the History of Ideas in 1976.

== Works ==
- Miller, Jim, ed. (1976). The Rolling Stone Illustrated History of Rock & Roll: The Definitive History of the Most Important Artists and Their Music (First ed.). Random House. ISBN 978-0394732381. LCCN 76021728. OCLC 987864025. OL 21363112M – via Internet Archive.
- History and Human Existence: From Marx to Merleau-Ponty Berkeley : University of California Press, 1979. OCLC 301475821
- Rousseau: Dreamer of Democracy New Haven : Yale University Press, 1984. ISBN 9780300030440, OCLC 185688579
- Democracy Is in the Streets: From Port Huron to the Siege of Chicago Cambridge, MA : Harvard University Press, 1987. ISBN 9780671662356, OCLC 465149131
- The Passion of Michel Foucault Cambridge, Mass. : Harvard University Press, 1993. ISBN 9780674001572, OCLC 43902491
- Flowers in the Dustbin: The Rise of Rock and Roll, 1947-1977 New York, NY : Fireside, 1999. ISBN 9780684865607, OCLC 45317892
- Examined Lives: From Socrates to Nietzsche New York, NY : Picador, 2011. ISBN 9781250002327, OCLC 843060428
- Can Democracy Work?: A Short History of a Radical Idea, from Ancient Athens to Our World New York : Farrar, Straus and Giroux, 2018. ISBN 9780374137649, OCLC 1019944586

=== Essays ===
- The Abyss of Philosophy: Rousseau's Concept of Freedom
- El Paso
- In Praise of Recklessness
- Return of the Weathermen
- Is Bad Writing Necessary?: George Orwell, Theodor Adorno, and the Politics of Language
