= Irene Jarsky =

Irène Jarsky Decoust (born 8 July 1939 Toulouse) is a lyric soprano and French music professor.

== Biography ==
Irène Jarsky studied harp, drawing, and classical ballet, but focused her training on singing. She studied at the Conservatoire National Supérieur de Musique de Paris . She was part of the " Compagnie Renaud-Barrault " between 1961 and 1964. In 1964 and 1965, she won two first prizes for singing at the Conservatoire, and in 1967 the Erik Satie Prize.

Since 1972, she has taught at the Conservatoire Expérimental de Pantin, where she was director between 1977 and 1980. During the academic year 1980–1981, she founded the workshop "La vie contemporaine" in Paris and received a research grant on the experimentation of word simulation in the laboratory.

Since 1982, she has been a member of a research commission on vocal physiology and is an inspector at the Directorate of Music at the Ministry of Culture. She performed at the Opéra de Paris. She performed several works by French composers (Jean-Claude Risset, Allain Gaussin, Debussy, Ravel, Satie and Poulenc), even though her career has mainly focused on vocal research.

She premiered Inharmonique.
