= The Sleepwalkers (Broch novel) =

Novel by Hermann Broch

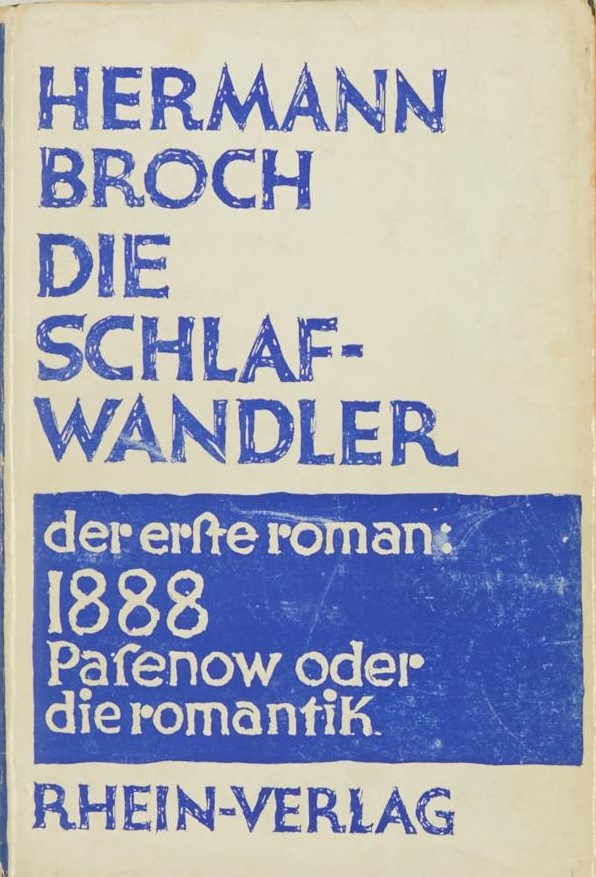
- Author: Hermann Broch
- Language: German
- Genre: Philosophical novel
- Publication date: 1930–32
- Publication place: Austria
- Media type: Print

The Sleepwalkers (German: Die Schlafwandler) is a 1930s novel in three parts, by the Austrian novelist and essayist Hermann Broch. Opening in 1888, the first part is built around a young Prussian army officer; the second in 1903 around a Luxembourger bookkeeper; and the third in 1918 around an Alsatian wine dealer. Each is in a sense a sleepwalker, living between vanishing and emerging ethical systems just as the somnambulist exists in a state between sleeping and waking. Together they present a panorama of German society and its progressive deterioration of values that culminated in defeat and collapse at the end of World War I.

An English translation in 1932 by Edwin and Willa Muir received good reviews and the work has been admired since World War II by serious European critics, who put Broch in the company of Franz Kafka, Thomas Mann and Robert Musil as well as James Joyce and Marcel Proust.

== Plot ==
=== 1888: Joachim von Pasenow ===
The first part, set mostly in Berlin and an unnamed eastern province of Prussia, concerns an unsure young aristocrat and army officer, Joachim von Pasenow. He wavers between his romantic devotion to a Czech prostitute Ruzena Hruska and his duty which is to court Elisabeth von Baddensen, the heiress of a neighbouring landowner and his social equal. In his secret liaison with the earthy Ruzena he finds emotional and sexual fulfilment, while Elisabeth is delicate and distant. Adrift among doubts and hesitation, he finds refuge in symbols from the past, such as the honour code of the nobility and the teaching of the Lutheran church. Adhering to these leads him into a loveless marriage with Elisabeth. On their wedding night, the hesitations both feel lead them to postpone consummation.

Almost all the decisions and actions of Joachim, Ruzena and Elisabeth are manipulated by his diabolical friend, a successful worldly businessman called Eduard von Bertrand who, for his evident lack of comprehension for old values, Joachim never trusts fully.

=== 1903: August Esch ===
Set along the River Rhine, mainly in the cities of Cologne and Mannheim, this part is centred on August Esch, an able bookkeeper but restless with every job that he takes and every friend he makes. He eats at the bar of the widow Gertrud Hentjen, who keeps all men at a distance, and drinks there with Martin Geyring, a socialist trade union organiser.

When Geyring is unjustly imprisoned, Esch ascribes this to the owner of a large local business (Eduard von Bertrand from the first part), whom he scorns as an exploiter and a homosexual. In fury he visits Bertrand's mansion, intending to murder him, but is talked out of the deed.

A visit to a variety theatre enthuses him with possibilities, meeting the producer and some of the artistes. He links up with an impresario, backing him in a venture to show female wrestlers in revealing costumes. Initially a sensation, the public tires of the act and takings fall. Esch dreams of emigrating to the US, a land of opportunities, but his partner absconds with the assets.

Like von Pasenow in the first part, Esch feels insecure in the world of decaying old values (here the values of business and middle-class life) and tries to find a guilty party to blame. In the end, he marries Gertrud and returns to Luxembourg, where he goes back to accounting.

=== 1918: Wilhelm Huguenau ===
Characters from the first two parts are united in a little (fictional) town on the River Moselle during the last months of World War I, with many new characters introduced.

The now elderly Major von Pasenow is the military commandant of the town, striving to maintain order and dignity as the population succumbs to starvation and disease. A military hospital is full of victims of the war in various stages of mental and physical decay. Esch has moved there with his wife to run the modest local newspaper, finding an outlet for his restless search for meaning in an informal religious sect, which von Pasenow joins.

A deserter, Wilhelm Huguenau, cheats Esch out of control of his newspaper and attempts to insinuate himself into the favour of the Major. Hanna Wiedling, withdrawn young wife of a lawyer serving at the front, tries to cope with life on her own. Shell-shocked and mutilated soldiers interact with hospital doctors, nurses and townsfolk. Sometimes the narrative loops back to Berlin where Marie, a former sex worker who is now a Salvation Army worker, has befriended Nuchem, a young Jewish man who is a refugee from the East. At other times the illusion of fiction is abandoned and the author launches into philosophical analysis of the deterioration of values in Europe generally and in Germany in particular.

The finale takes place during the closing days of the war, as the town sinks into chaos. The Major is wounded by rioters, perhaps fatally, while Huguenau bayonets Esch and rapes his wife Gertrud. In a postscript, Huguenau has become a respectable businessman in France, but finds his life entirely empty.

Closing reflections from the author predict that the destruction of values in Germany has left the way open for an amoral and ruthless new Leader to emerge, who will prophesy a new future for the disoriented nation.

== Themes ==
The Sleepwalkers explores what Broch described as "the loneliness of the I" in its three parts.

The protagonists of the first two parts of the book are represented as holding to certain sets of values. Broch describes the struggles they undergo as their codes for living, or values, prove inadequate to the realities of the social environment they find themselves in. Joachim von Pasenow in the first part is "the romantic". In the second part, August Esch tries to live according to the motto "business is business".

Eventually, in the third part, the amoral Huguenau's only standard for behavior is his personal profit. He follows this maxim in all his actions, swindling and murdering without remorse. Ultimately, he reached a point of zero values without remorse and his dealings bring him finally to the zero point of values. Although Broch doesn't hold Huguenau up as someone to admire, he does present him as "the only adequate child of his age" and as the inevitable harbinger of fascism.

As one reviewer noted, "His characters are sleepwalkers because their own lives are shaped by the forces of the nightmare reality in which they live."

== Writing process ==
Beginning in his early forties, Broch had devoted himself to writing, and The Sleepwalkers, composed between 1928 and 1932, was his literary début. Before that he had published only essays.

In creating the plot of the book, Broch was inspired by his associates and friends for several characters and events, for example his mistress and confidante the Viennese journalist Ea von Allesch, who gave him the idea of the vaudeville artiste Ilona.

Each part differs in style, time and place of action, characters and atmosphere. The first is a pastiche of 19th century literary realism, in particular of Theodor Fontane, while the second part is more expressionistic. The third reflects the artificial and disjointed nature of the time it describes by a fractured narrative, jumping between threads of the story, moving between prose to verse, and inserting philosophical speculations which provide a theoretical framework to the whole book. In this way, Broch tried to represent the complexity of the individual mental world and that of society, much as, for example, James Joyce did in Ulysses.

Through the book there runs a complex structure of images, which encapsulate some of its key themes. One is uniforms, which stand for order, hierarchy and certainty. Their opposite is images of freedom, in particular the Statue of Liberty.

Broch often criticised the era from 1880 to 1918. He found another chance to do so in his book of essays Hofmannsthal and His Time (Hofmannsthal und seine Zeit), criticising fin-de-siecle culture in Vienna which he felt was represented by kitsch and fussiness. He created his own term, "the gay apocalypse", to describe this period.

== Reception ==
The Sleepwalkers was among the Czech-French novelist Milan Kundera's favourite novels. He dedicated a chapter of his essay "The Art of the Novel" (L'Art du roman) to an interpretation of it.

The book is also mentioned in Michelangelo Antonioni's film La Notte (1961), where the novelist Pontano (Marcello Mastroianni) finds a copy lying around in the mansion of a philistine magnate where a vapid party is being held, upon which he incredulously asks his wife Lidia (Jeanne Moreau) "Who here would be reading The Sleepwalkers?"

Critic Stephen Spender described it as "one of the few really original and thoughtful novels of this century. If it owes a good deal to Joyce and Proust, then Broch has transformed their interior techniques and many-faceted sensibilities into something as harshly German as the painting of Bosch. For him art is not an end, it is an instrument of language which transforms the crudest, ugliest reality of actuality into another reality of religious vision."

Louis Kronenberger said of the novel, "Without much doubt here is one of the few first-rate novels of our generation."

In the New York Times Book Review, J.P. Bauke wrote, "The moral impulse behind The Sleepwalkers does not detract from the book's esthetic appeal. On the contrary, Broch's moral seriousness gives the novel a vitality that raises it from the level of historical fiction....It is an intellectual adventure of the highest order, the book on which Broch's claim to greatness rests."
