= Piano Sonata (Barraqué) =

The Piano Sonata by Jean Barraqué, composed between 1950 and 1952, is a significant serial composition, from the period of avant-garde composition in France shortly after World War II. It is a large piece, lasting around forty minutes according to the score, but ranging from 30 to 50 minutes in recordings attended by the composer. It is in a single movement divided into two connected sections, roughly equal in length.

== Influences ==
The densely dissonant polyphonic texture of the work resembles the Second Piano Sonata of Pierre Boulez, a work Barraqué knew well. In performance, however, the overall impact is quite different from anything of Boulez, and has often been claimed (e.g. by Hodeir (1961)), to be akin in spirit to the late sonatas of Ludwig van Beethoven.

In its turn, Barraqué's Sonata spurred his pupil Bill Hopkins to compose his cycle of Etudes en série (1965–1972, 1997), which develops some of Barraqué's serial techniques, and its scale, but has its own musical characteristics.

== Structure ==
Paul Griffiths has written of the music of the sonata: "contrasts of themes or keys are replaced by other polarities, in particular between perceptions of notes as sounds (acontextual, as if heard alone) and as tones (part of the unfolding of a serial form), between freedom and fixity in the registral placing of notes, between pulsed and pulseless rhythm and between sound and silence. In his preface to the composition Barraqué drew attention to another opposition, between a 'free style' of motifs and chords in easy flow and a 'strict style' of intensive, quasi-automatic process acknowledging the total serialism of the time. Compulsion, embodied in the strict music, may seem to spur protest in the free passages. But protest is compromised by having to be voiced in the same language, based on the same series." Herbert Henck has also noted: "The overall structure was based on juxtaposing a fast movement with a slow one of equal weight. But as the fast movement built up, slow sections were increasingly introduced, and the slow movement contained some fast ones, so that there was a balance of contrasts within the work as a whole. The piece closed in unison in a mediating tempo with a twelve-tone row, whose basic form determined the pitch structure of the whole work."

== Performance history ==
The sonata was recorded commercially by Yvonne Loriod between 28 and 30 October 1957 and issued in 1958. This recording was made in the presence of the composer, and from the manuscript, which was corrected and modified by the composer during the sessions. It was not given its first performance in public until 24 April 1967, when the Danish pianist Elisabeth Klein played it in a recital in Copenhagen, seemingly unaware that she was in fact giving the world première.

The Sonata was subsequently recorded commercially by Claude Helffer in 1969 and Roger Woodward in 1972, both also in the presence of the composer. A concert recording from 1972 by Francoise Thinat, prepared with the composer, has also been released on CD.

The new critical edition of the Sonata by Heribert Henrich was given its first performance from an early draft, in 2012 in Berlin, by Nicolas Hodges. The concert also included the world premiere by Hodges of Barraqué's juvenile piano works and songs. The new edition was given its first recording by Jean-Pierre Collot in 2018, release 2019 (see Discography).

== Published editions ==
The Sonata had been published by Aldo Bruzzichelli, Florence in 1966; the rights have since transferred to Bärenreiter-Verlag of Kassel. The original edition is rife with notational errors, and some performers (particularly Henck) made extensive corrections. In 2019 however, the long-awaited critical edition by Heribert Henrich was published by Bärenreiter.

- Jean Barraqué, Sonate pour piano. Aldo Bruzzichelli Editore, Florence. 1965.
- Jean Barraqué, Sonate pour piano. Kassel, Bärenreiter-Verlag, 1993: BA 7284. (reprint of Bruzzichelli edition)
- Jean Barraqué, Sonate pour piano, critical edition by Heribert Henrich. BA 11416 (2 vols). Kassel, Bärenreiter-Verlag, 2019. ISMN 979-0-006-56760-7

== Discography ==
- Yvonne Loriod recorded 28 and 30 October 1957, issued on LP Vega C 30 A 180 in 1958. CD reissue as part of Yvonne Loriod – The Complete Vega Recordings 1956–1963 DECCA 48170692, 2019.
- Claude Helffer Released on LP Valois MB 952, 1969. (Never rereleased on CD)
- Roger Woodward Recorded 27–29 October 1972, released on LP EMI EMSP 55 (1973) and LP Unicorn-Kanchana UNS 263 (1979) (with a sleeve note by Bill Hopkins). CD reissue on Celestial Harmonies 13325-2, 2014.
- Francois Thinat Concert recording 25 February 1972, issued on CD FY Solstice SOCD 315/6, 2015.
- Chen Pi-hsien Released on CD Telos Records tls 006, 1997
- Stefan Litwin Recorded 13–16 October 1997, released on CD cpo 999 569–2, 1998
- Herbert Henck Recorded July 1996, released on CD ECM 1621, 1999
- Jean-Frédéric Neuburger Concert recording 14 January 2011, released on CD Mirare MIR 145, 2011.
- Jean-Pierre Collot Released on CD Winter & Winter 910 257–2, 2019

Woodward worked extensively with Barraqué before his recording. There are photographs, some of which were reproduced in the booklet of Woodward's CD, showing Barraqué and Woodward in two different settings, one working together at a desk and the other one working together in a recording studio with Woodward at the keyboard and Barraqué standing near, talking. Woodward's notes on his recording tell the story in great detail.

== Notes ==
=== Sources ===
- Halbreich, Harry, "Jean Barraqué: Complete Works", essay (1987) translated by Elizabeth Buzzard and first published in programme-book of 1989 Almeida Festival.
- Hodeir, André. 1961. La musique depuis Debussy. Paris: Presses universitaires de France. English edition, as Since Debussy: A View of Contemporary Music. pp. 193–196. Translated by Noël Burch. Evergreen original, E-260. New York: Grove Press; London: Secker and Warburg, 1961.
