= Jean Barraqué =

French composer, musicologist, and lecturer (1928–1973)

Jean-Henri-Alphonse Barraqué (17 January 1928 – 17 August 1973) was a French composer and music writer. His relatively small œuvre is known for its serialism.

== Life ==
Barraqué was born in Puteaux, Hauts-de-Seine. In 1931, he moved with his family to Paris. He studied in Paris with Jean Langlais and Olivier Messiaen and, through Messiaen, became interested in serialism. After completing his Piano Sonata in 1952, he suppressed or destroyed his earlier works. A book published by the French music critic André Hodeir, titled Since Debussy, created controversy around Barraqué by claiming this work as perhaps the finest piano sonata since Beethoven. As the work had still not been publicly performed, and only two other works by him had at this time, the extravagant claims made for Barraqué in this book were received with some scepticism. With hindsight, however, it is clear that Hodeir had accurately perceived the exceptional features of Barraqué's music—notably its searing Romantic intensity, which distinguishes it from the contemporaneous works of Boulez or Stockhausen.

As Paul Griffiths' biography clarified, Boulez had in fact attempted to get the Barraqué Piano Sonata performed for some years after it was finished. Barraqué's music was published starting in 1963 by the Florentine businessman Aldo Bruzzichelli, who provided much-needed material assistance for the composer, but whose promotion could not perhaps compete with that of the better known Universal Edition in Vienna who published Boulez, Berio, and Stockhausen.

Embracing the Parisian avant-garde, Barraqué entered into a romantic relationship with the philosopher Michel Foucault. Together, they tried to produce their greatest work, used recreational drugs heavily and engaged in sado-masochistic sexual activity.

Barraqué was involved in a car accident in 1964, and his apartment was destroyed by fire in November 1968. He suffered from bad health for much of his life. Nevertheless, his death in Paris in August 1973, at the age of 45, was sudden and unexpected, and he appeared to have resumed serious work on a number of larger compositions from the Death of Virgil cycle.

== Music and reputation ==
Barraqué stated that he wrote about 30 works before those that he eventually acknowledged; as far as is known they were destroyed by him. They included a Nocturne and Mouvement lent for piano, at least three piano sonatas, a sonata for unaccompanied violin, and a symphony in C-sharp minor. The presumably fourth, but un-numbered Piano Sonata, for which he gave the date 1952, was his earliest acknowledged work. Barraqué then produced his only electronic piece, the musique concrète Etude (1954), made at Pierre Schaeffer's studio. Subsequently, he planned a large-scale cycle of pieces, La Mort de Virgile, based on Hermann Broch's novel The Death of Virgil, a book which Barraqué's friend and sometime lover Michel Foucault recommended to him. This cycle, along with other pieces deriving from it or acting as commentaries upon it, he envisaged as his principal lifelong creative project. Following the scheme of the novel, it was to be divided into four sub-cycles: Water (The Arrival), Fire (The Descent), Earth (The Expectancy) and Air (The Return). Most of Barraqué's creative efforts went into the works which were to take their place in Fire (The Descent), which – to give an idea of the projected scope of the whole design – was to have consisted of thirteen works. Before his death he completed two of the projected parts: Chant après chant (1966), and Le Temps restitué (1957/68). Fragments of some of the other parts exist.

Barraqué also wrote ... Au delà du hasard (1958–59) for three female voices and ensemble, and a Concerto for clarinet, vibraphone and ensemble in 1962–68, which are related to The Death of Virgil, but not actually part of that cycle. (... Au delà du hasard is described as a commentary on Affranchi du hasard, which was to have been the eleventh piece of Fire (The Descent) but was not actually composed.) The only other extant piece by Barraqué is Séquence (1955–56), a setting of Nietzsche for soprano and ensemble which is partly a re-working of three songs for soprano and piano from the early fifties.

Barraqué's use of tone rows in his work is quite distinctive. Rather than using a single tone row for an entire piece, as Anton Webern did, or using a number of related rows in one work, as Alban Berg or Arnold Schoenberg sometimes did, Barraqué starts by using one row, and then subtly alters it to get a second. This second row is then used for a while before being slightly altered again to make a third. This process continues throughout the work. He called this technique "proliferating series".

Harry Halbreich has written that "Barraqué's whole work is marked by terrible despair, lightened by no religious or ideological faith, and entirely dominated by the great shadow of Death". In 1998 the record company CPO issued his entire output on CD, in performances by the Austrian ensemble Klangforum Wien.

The major reference work on his music in English is a biography entitled The Sea on Fire by the British music critic Paul Griffiths (2003). In German, Heribert Henrich's book of 1997 is its complement. His music is now published by the German firm of Bärenreiter.

== Writings ==
Barraqué wrote many articles on other composers (including Alban Berg, Monteverdi, Mozart and Messiaen) and on theoretical aspects of contemporary music. His major prose work is his book on Claude Debussy (Paris: Éditions du Seuil, 1962). He also made numerous analyses of works in the standard repertoire from J. S. Bach to Honegger, some of which he used in his teaching. His few pupils included the British composer Bill Hopkins.

== Compositions ==
=== Completed works ===
- Sonata for solo violin (1949)
- Trois Mélodies for soprano and piano (1950) (texts from The Song of Solomon, Baudelaire and Rimbaud)
- Séquence for voice, percussion and chamber ensemble (1950–55) (text by Nietzsche; incorporates material from the Trois Mélodies)
- Piano Sonata (1950–52)
- Etude for three-track tape (1952–53)
- Le Temps restitué for soprano, chorus and orchestra (1956–68) (text from Hermann Broch, The Death of Virgil, in French translation by Albert Kohn)
- ... Au delà du hasard (premier Commentaire de 'Affranchi du hasard' et du 'Temps Restitué') for four instrumental groups and one vocal group (1958–59) (text by Barraqué 'around a quotation of Hermann Broch')
- Concerto for six instrumental groups and two solo instruments (vibraphone and clarinet) (1962–68)
- Chant après chant for six percussionists, voice and piano (1966) (text by Barraqué and Hermann Broch)

=== Unfinished works ===
- Sonorité jaune (1957 sketch based on Wassily Kandinsky, Der gelbe Klang)
- Musique de scène for 4 clarinets (bass clarinet), 3 saxophones (alto, tenor, baritone), 2 trumpets, 2 trombones, tuba, percussion (3 players), xylophone, vibraphone, celesta, glockenspiel and piano. It also includes two reciters, "L'aventurier" (The Adventurer) and "Le pauvre homme" (The Poor Man). 1958–59. Premiere sirene Operntheater, Austria, 2017.
- Discours (c. 1961): sketch for a work for voices and orchestra, text from Hermann Broch, The Death of Virgil, in French translation by Albert Kohn)
- Lysanias (c. 1966–69; 1972–73): sketch for three solo voices and orchestra (text by Barraqué and Hermann Broch). The first performance was scheduled for the 1973 Royan Festival, before being cancelled due to incompletion.
- Portiques du Feu (c. 1968; 1972–73): sketch for 18 solo voices (text by Barraqué and Hermann Broch)
- Hymnes à Plotia for string quartet (1972–73)

== Notes ==
=== Sources ===
- Eribon, Didier. 1991 [1989]. Michel Foucault, translated by Betsy Wing. Cambridge, Massachusetts: Harvard University Press. ISBN 978-0-674-57286-7.
- Griffiths, Paul (2001). "Barraqué, Jean". In Stanley Sadie; John Tyrrell (eds.). The New Grove Dictionary of Music and Musicians. London: Macmillan.
- Griffiths, Paul: ‘La Rochelle, Royan', The Musical Times, Vol. 114, No. 1564 (Jun., 1973), p. 629 https://doi.org/10.2307/955598 https://www.jstor.org/stable/955598
- Griffiths, Paul (2003). The Sea on Fire: Jean Barraqué. Eastman Studies in Music. Vol. 25. Rochester, New York: Rochester University Press. ISBN 1-58046-141-7. ISSN 1071-9989.
- Halbreich, Harry, "Jean Barraqué: Complete Works", essay (1987) translated by Elizabeth Buzzard, first published in programme book of 1989 Almeida Festival.
- Henrich, Heribert (1997). Das Werk Jean Barraqués. Genese und Faktur. Bärenreiter. ISBN 3-7618-1386-4.
- Hodeir, André. 1961. La musique depuis Debussy. Paris: Presses universitaires de France. English edition, as Since Debussy: A View of Contemporary Music. pp- 193-196Translated by Noël Burch. Evergreen original, E-260. New York: Grove Press; London: Secker and Warburg, 1961.https://www.harmonies.com/13325-2_woodward_barraque/hodeir_barraque.pdf
- Janzen, Rose-Marie (Winter 1989). "A Biographical Chronology of Jean Barraqué". Perspectives of New Music. 27 (1). Translated by Adrian Jack: 234–245. doi:10.2307/833269. JSTOR 833269.
- Macey, David. 1993. The Lives of Michel Foucault. London: Hutchinson. ISBN 978-0-09-175344-3.
- Miller, James. 1993. The Passion of Michel Foucault. New York: Simon & Schuster. ISBN 978-0-674-00157-2.
- Page, Tim (24 November 1986). "Music: Prism Orchestra in Barraqué Premiere". The New York Times.
- Riotte, André (1987). "Les séries proliférantes selon Barraqué: Approche formelle". Entretemps (5): 65–74.
