= The Passion of Michel Foucault =

1993 book by James Miller

- Cover of the first edition
- Author: James Miller
- Language: English
- Subject: Michel Foucault
- Publisher: Simon & Schuster
- Publication date: 1993
- Publication place: United States
- Media type: Print (Hardcover & Paperback)
- Pages: 491
- ISBN: 978-0671695507

The Passion of Michel Foucault is a biography of the French philosopher Michel Foucault authored by the American philosopher James Miller. It was first published in the United States by Simon & Schuster in 1993.

Within the book, Miller made the claim that Foucault's experiences in the gay sadomasochism community during the time he taught at Berkeley directly influenced his political and philosophical works. Miller's ideas have been rebuked by certain Foucault scholars as being either simply misdirected, a sordid reading of his life and works, or as a politically motivated, intentional misreading.

== Reception ==
Writing for The Boston Globe, book critic George Scialabba described The Passion of Michel Foucault as an "intensely interesting" work which provides an "astoundingly vivid though non-prurient description of (mainly homosexual) sadomasochism".
