= Charles Bruck =

French-American conductor and teacher

Charles Bruck (2 May 1911 – 16 July 1995) was a French-American conductor and teacher.

== Biography ==
Bruck was born in a Jewish family in Temesvár, Banat, then in the Kingdom of Hungary, part of Austro-Hungarian Empire, since 1920 Timișoara in Romania.

He left Romania in 1928 for a year of studies in Vienna, then travelled on to Paris. There he studied with Alfred Cortot, Nadia Boulanger and Vlado Perlemuter at the École Normale de Musique. In 1934 he began studies with French conductor Pierre Monteux, following him to San Francisco where Bruck served as Monteux's assistant.

After the Second World War, Bruck assumed chief conductor positions with the Orchestra of the Netherlands Opera in Amsterdam (1950–1954), the Orchestre Philharmonique de Strasbourg (1955–1965), and the Orchestre Philharmonique de l'ORTF in Paris (1965–1970). In 1969, he succeeded Monteux as director of his conducting school in Maine, a post he held for twenty-six years until his death there in 1995.

He was a champion of contemporary music and presented hundreds of world premieres in his career. He also taught at The Hartt School of Music where he served as Director of Orchestral Activities. He was a visiting professor at Princeton University in 1992.

Bruck died of cancer in Hancock, Maine, USA. A play about his career as Master of the Pierre Monteux School, called Muse of Fire, written by David Katz, one of his students, was premiered in Maine in 2005 and has since toured extensively.

Cultural offices
Preceded by Eugène Bigot	Music Directors, Orchestre Philharmonique de Radio France; 1965–1970	Succeeded by Gilbert Amy
