= André Krust =

French classical pianist (1926–2020)

André Krust (10 May 1926 – 7 September 2020) was a French classical pianist.

== Biography ==
Born in Belfort, Krust studied at the Conservatoire de Paris in Jean Doyen's class and won a second prize for piano in 1950. He later worked with Yves Nat and Pierre Kostanoff, and won a prize at the International Franz Liszt Piano Competition in 1956. He has been teaching at the Amiens and Montreuil conservatories, at the Université d'Ottawa and the Conservatoire de Luxembourg. He died in Aulnay-sous-Bois on 7 September 2020.

== Discography ==
Schumann's complete works for piano at RCA, 1973.

== Sources ==
Charles Timbrell, French pianism: an historical perspective, Kahn & Averill, London, 1999, p. 268.
