= Hermann Broch =

Austrian writer (1886–1951)

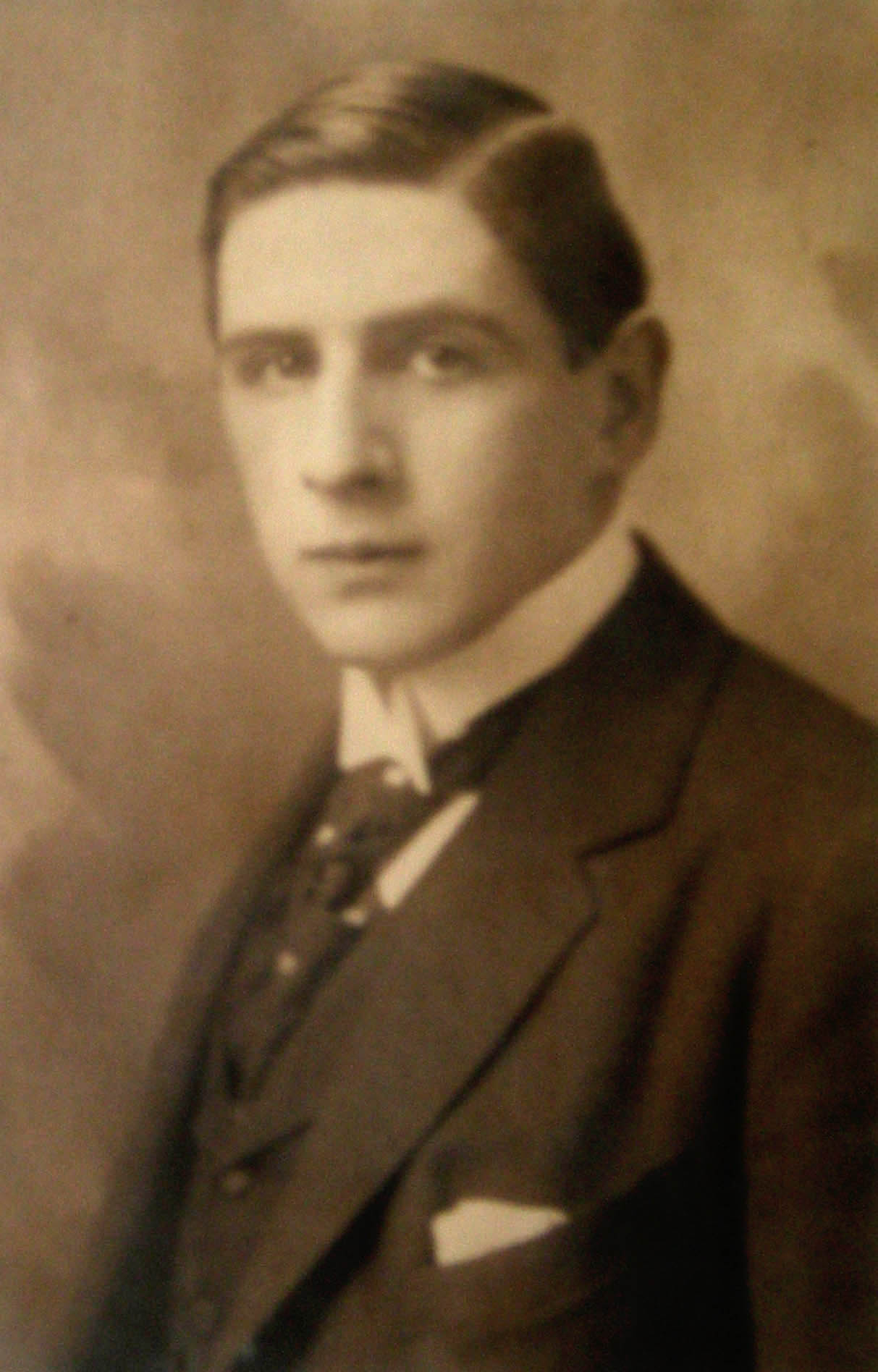
- Born: November 1, 1886; Vienna, Austria-Hungary
- Died: May 30, 1951 (aged 64); New Haven, Connecticut, U.S.
- Writing career
- Movement: Modernism

Hermann Broch (Austrian German: [brɔx]; 1 November 1886 – 30 May 1951) was an Austrian writer, best known for two major works of modernist fiction: The Sleepwalkers (Die Schlafwandler, 1930–32) and The Death of Virgil (Der Tod des Vergil, 1945).

== Life ==
Broch was born in Vienna, Austria-Hungary, to a prosperous Jewish family, and worked for some time in his family's factory, though he maintained his literary interests privately. As the oldest son, he was expected to take over his father’s textile factory in Teesdorf; therefore, he attended a technical college for textile manufacture and a spinning and weaving college.

In 1909 he converted to Roman Catholicism and married Franziska von Rothermann, the daughter of a knighted manufacturer. The following year, their son Hermann Friedrich Maria was born. His marriage ended in divorce in 1923. In 1927 he sold the textile factory and decided to study mathematics, philosophy and psychology at the University of Vienna. He embarked on a full-time literary career around the age of 40. At the age of 45, his first major literary work, the trilogy The Sleepwalkers, was published by Daniel Brody for the Rhein Verlag in Munich in three volumes from 1930 to 1932.

He was acquainted with many of the writers, intellectuals, and artists of his time, including Robert Musil, Rainer Maria Rilke, Elias Canetti, Leo Perutz, Franz Blei and writer and former nude model Ea von Allesch.

After the annexation of Austria by the Nazis on 12 March 1938, Broch was arrested in the small Alpine town of Bad Aussee for possession of a socialist magazine and detained in the district jail from the 13th to the 31st of March. Shortly thereafter, a movement organized by friends – including James Joyce, Thornton Wilder, and his translators Edwin and Willa Muir – managed to help him emigrate; first to Britain and then to the United States, where he published his novel The Death of Virgil and his collection of short stories The Guiltless. While in exile, he also continued to write on politics and work on mass psychology, similar to Elias Canetti and Hannah Arendt. His essay on mass behaviour remained unfinished. Broch's work on mass psychology was intended to form part of more ambitious project to defend democracy, human rights, and human dignity as irreducible ethical absolutes in a postreligious age.

From the 15th of August to the 15th of September 1939, Hermann Broch lived at the Albert Einstein House at 112 Mercer Street Princeton, New Jersey when the Einsteins were on vacation. From 1942 to 1948 Broch lived in an attic apartment in Eric and Lili Kahler's house at One Evelyn Place in Princeton, New Jersey. Broch died in 1951 in New Haven, Connecticut. He is buried in Killingworth, Connecticut, in the cemetery on Roast Meat Hill Road. He was nominated for the Nobel Prize in Literature in 1950.

== Work ==
Broch's first major literary work was the trilogy The Sleepwalkers (Die Schlafwandler), published in three volumes from 1930 to 1932. Broch centers the essay "Zerfall der Werte" ("The Disintegration of Values") in the final novel, providing an overarching theory of the trilogy's form and approach to contemporary culture. The trilogy has been praised by Milan Kundera, whose writing has been greatly influenced by Broch.

One of his foremost works, The Death of Virgil (Der Tod des Vergil) was first published in June 1945 in both its English translation and original German. Having begun the text as a short radio lecture in 1937, Broch expanded and redeveloped the text over the next eight years of his life, which witnessed a short incarceration in an Austrian prison after the Austrian Anschluss, his flight to Scotland via England, and his eventual exile in the United States. This extensive, difficult novel interweaves reality, hallucination, poetry and prose, and reenacts the last 18 hours of the Roman poet Virgil's life in the port of Brundisium (Brindisi). Here, shocked by the balefulness (Unheil) of the society he glorifies in his Aeneid, the feverish Virgil resolves to burn his epic, but is thwarted by his close friend and emperor Augustus before he succumbs to his fatal ailment. The final chapter exhibits the final hallucinations of the poet, where Virgil voyages to a distant land at which he witnesses roughly the biblical creation story in reverse.

Broch's last work to be published before his death was The Guiltless (Die Schuldlosen, 1950), a collection of stories. An incomplete novel was posthumously published in German as: Der Versucher in 1953, Demeter in 1967, Bergroman in 1969, and Die Verzauberung in 1976. The first manuscript was translated into English as The Spell by Broch's son, H.F. Broch de Rothermann and published in 1987.

Broch demonstrates mastery of a wide range of styles, from the gentle parody of Theodor Fontane in the first volume of The Sleepwalkers through the essayistic segments of the third volume to the phantasmagoria in verse form of The Death of Virgil.

== Selected bibliography ==
- Die Schlafwandler. Eine Romantrilogie (1930–32). The Sleepwalkers: A Trilogy, trans. by Edwin and Willa Muir (1932).
  - Pasenow; oder, Die Romantik – 1888 (1930). Part One: The Romantic.
  - Esch; oder, Die Anarchie – 1903 (1931). Part Two: The Anarchist.
  - Huguenau, oder, Die Sachlichkeit – 1918 (1932). Part Three: The Realist.
- Die unbekannte Größe (1933). The Unknown Quantity, trans. by Edwin and Willa Muir (1935).
- Der Tod des Vergil (1945). The Death of Virgil, trans. by Jean Starr Untermeyer (1945).
- Die Schuldlosen (1950). The Guiltless, trans. by Ralph Manheim (1974).
- Short Stories (1966), edited by E. W. Herd, introduction in English, text in German. Includes: "Verlorener Sohn"; "Eine leichte Enttäuschung"; "Der Meeresspiegel"; and "Die Heimkehr des Vergil".
- Hofmannsthal und seine Zeit (1974). Hugo von Hofmannsthal and His Time, trans. by Michael P. Steinberg (1984).
- Die Verzauberung (1976). The Spell, trans. by Hermann Broch de Rothermann (1987).
- Geist and Zeitgeist: The Spirit in an Unspiritual Age (2002). Six essays translated by John Hargraves.

Complete works in German: Kommentierte Werkausgabe, ed. Paul Michael Lützeler. Frankfurt am Main: Suhrkamp, 1974–1981.

- KW 1: Die Schlafwandler. Eine Romantrilogie
- KW 2: Die unbekannte Größe. Roman
- KW 3: Die Verzauberung. Roman
- KW 4: Der Tod des Vergil. Roman
- KW 5: Die Schuldlosen. Roman in elf Erzählungen
- KW 6: Novellen
- KW 7: Dramen
- KW 8: Gedichte
- KW 9/ 1+2: Schriften zur Literatur
- KW 10/ 1+2: Philosophische Schriften
- KW 11: Politische Schriften
- KW 12: Massenwahntheorie
- KW 13/ 1+2+3: Briefe.

== See also ==
- Exilliteratur
- List of Austrian writers
