= André Hodeir =

French musician (1921–2011)

André Hodeir (22 January 1921 – 1 November 2011) was a French violinist, composer, arranger and musicologist.

== Biography ==
Hodeir was born in Paris and trained as a classical violinist and composer. He studied at the Conservatoire de Paris, where he was taught by Olivier Messiaen and won first prizes in fugue, harmony, and music history. While pursuing these studies he discovered jazz and various music forms besides jazz and classical. He recorded on violin under the pseudonym "Claude Laurence". As a critic, his tough but insightful analytic writings were much acclaimed and influential (Jazz: Its Evolution and Essence; English edition 1956).

In 1954 he was a founder and director of Jazz Groupe de Paris, which included Bobby Jaspar, Pierre Michelot and Nat Peck. In 1957, at the invitation of Ozzie Cadena of Savoy Records, he recorded an album of his compositions with Donald Byrd, Idrees Sulieman, Frank Rehak, Hal McKusick, Eddie Costa, George Duvivier, and Annie Ross.

In addition to two books of Essais (1954 and 1956), he wrote film scores, including Le Palais Idéal by Ado Kyrou for the film Chutes de pierres, danger de mort by Michel Fano, and Brigitte Bardot's Une Parisienne. He founded an orchestra during the 1960s and composed a work based on the Anna Livia Plurabelle story from the novel Finnegans Wake by James Joyce.

He died in Versailles.

== Discography ==
- Jazz et Jazz (Philips, 1963)
- American Jazzmen Play Andre Hodeir's Essais (Savoy, 1957)
- The Paris Scene (Savoy, 1957)
- Anna Livia Plurabelle (Philips, 1966)
- Bitter Ending with Les Swingle Singers (Epic, 1972)
- The Historic Donaueschingen Jazz Concert 1957 with Eddie Sauter (Pausa, 1980)

== Bibliography ==
- André Hodeir, Le Jazz, cet inconnu, preface by Charles Delaunay, collection "Harmoniques", Éditions France-Empire, 1945
- Si seulement la vie : nouvelles (2001)
- Les aventures de la chevalière, (1983 historical novel for children)
- La chevalière et le panache blanc, (1983 historical novel for children)
- Le Rire de Swann, ed. Rouge Profond, coll. Birdland, Paris 2006
- Le Joueur de violon (Musikant)
- La Musique depuis Debussy, Presses Universitaires de France, Paris, 1961
- Hommes et problèmes du jazz, Flammarion, Paris, 1954, re-released by Parenthèses, coll. Epistrophy, Paris 1981, 3 printings, then coll. Eupalinos, 2008
- Les Formes de la Musique, Presses Universitaires de France, coll. "Que sais-je ?" n° 478, Paris
- Jazzistiques ed. Parenthèses, coll. Epistrophy, Paris 2004
- Les Mondes du Jazz, ed. Rouge Profond, Paris 2004
- The André Hodeir Jazz Reader, Michigan University Press, 2006
- Pierre Fargeton, Le Jazz comme œuvre composée : le cas d'André Hodeir (2006, unpublished doctoral dissertation, Université Jean-Monnet (Saint-Étienne))
- Christian Tarting, article Hodeir, André (Dictionnaire du jazz, ed. Robert Laffont, coll. Bouquins)
