= Gilbert Amy =

French composer and conductor

- Born: 29 August 1936 (age 89); Paris, France
- Education: Conservatoire de Paris
- Occupations: Composer; Conductor; Academic teacher
- Organizations: Orchestre philharmonique de Radio France; Conservatoire National Supérieur de Musique
- Awards: Grand Prix National de la Musique
- Website: Official website

Gilbert Claude Adolphe Amy (born 29 August 1936) is a French composer and conductor.

== Career ==
Born in Paris, Amy entered the Conservatoire de Paris in 1954, where he was taught and influenced by Olivier Messiaen and Darius Milhaud and studied piano with Yvonne Loriod and fugue with Simone Plé-Caussade. His first composition (Œil de fumée) dates from 1955. In 1957 he met Pierre Boulez, under whose direction he composed his Piano Sonata. A year later Boulez commissioned from him a work called Mouvements, which was performed in Darmstadt by the Orchestre du Domaine musical. From 1958 to 1961 he attended the Darmstädter Ferienkurse given by Karlheinz Stockhausen, and developed a style highly influenced by the trend of serialism.

In 1962 Jean-Louis Barrault named him adjunct music director of the Odéon Theater in Paris. At the same time he undertook a career as conductor in Europe and Argentina. Between 1967 and 1973 he was the director of the Domaine Musical, succeeding Pierre Boulez. From 1973 to 1975 he was music advisor to ORTF and worked to "reform" the music heard on the radio. From 1976 to 1981, he was music director of the Nouvel Orchestre Philharmonique of Radio France. In 1984, Amy succeeded Pierre Cochereau as Director of the Conservatoire National Supérieur de Musique at Lyon, while continuing to compose music. His notable students include Micheline Coulombe Saint-Marcoux and Jeffrey Brooks.

Amy's talent as a composer has won him a number of awards including the Grand Prix National de la Musique in 1979, the Grand Prix of SACEM in 1983, the Grand Prix Musical of the City of Paris in 1986 and the Prix of the President of the Republic from the Academy Charles Cros in 1987.

== List of works ==
Title	Medium	Date of composition	Publisher
Variations	Flute, clarinet, cello, and piano	1956	unpublished (Éditions Durand-Salabert, for hire)
Inventions I et II	Flute, marimba/vibraphone, harp, and piano/celesta	1961	Heugel
Relais	Brass quintet	1969	Heugel
Trois Interludes	Violin and two percussionists	1984	Amphion
En trio	Clarinet, violin, and piano	1985	Amphion
Posaunen	Four trombones	1987	Amphion
Mémoire	Cello and piano	1989	Universal Edition
String quartet No. 1	String quartet	1990–92	Amphion
Brèves – String quartet No. 2	String quartet	1995	Amphion
Le Temps du souffle (I)	Two clarinets	1993–96	Amphion
Le Temps du souffle (II)	Violin, saxophone, and trombone	1993	Amphion
Symphonies pour cinq cuivres	Brass quintet	1992	Amphion
Trio Alto	Clarinet, percussion, and viola	1994	unpublished
Après Ein... Es Praeludium	Cello quartet	2006	unpublished
String quartet No. 3	String quartet	2009	Éditions Durand-Salabert
Épigrammes	Solo piano	1961	Heugel
Cahiers d'Épigrammes	Solo piano	1964	Heugel
Obliques I	Solo piano	1987	Amphion
Obliques II	Solo piano	1990	Amphion
Obliques III	Solo piano	1989	Amphion
Etude-Variation	Solo piano	2001	unpublished
Hai Ku	Solo piano	1997–2005	Éditions Henry Lemoine
Sept Bagatelles	Solo organ	1976	Amphion
Quasi una toccata	Solo organ	1981	Universal Editions
Trois Inventions	Solo organ	1993–2001	Éditions Musicales transatlantiques
En-Harmonies	Solo harp	1995	Amphion
Quasi scherzando	Solo cello	1981	Universal Editions
Petit thèma varié	Violin	2002	Éditions Henry Lemoine
6 Duos, for 2 violins	Two violins	2002	Éditions Henry Lemoine
D'ombre et lumière	Solo viola	2002	unpublished
D'ombre et lumière	Version for two violas	2003	unpublished
Trois Études	Solo flute	1977	Éditions Musicales transatlantiques
5/16	Flute and one wooden percussion	1986	Éditions Billaudot
Jeux	One or four oboes	1970	Universal Editions
La Stravinskienne	Solo marimba	1996	François Dhalmann Editions
Cycle	Percussion sextet	1966	Heugel
Seven Sites	Chamber ensemble	1975	Universal Editions
Echos XIII	French horn, trombone, harp, piano, and ensemble	1976	Universal Editions
Écrits sur toiles	Narrator and ensemble	1983	Amphion
La Variation ajoutée	Tape and 17 instruments	1984	Amphion
La temps du souffle III	French horn and ensemble	2001	Amphion
Cors et Cris	Ensemble and electronics	2011	Éditions Durand-Salabert (for hire)
Trajectoires	Violin and orchestra	1966	Heugel
Chant	Orchestra	1968	Heugel
Refrains	Orchestra	1972	Universal Editions
Adagio et stretto	Orchestra	1978	Universal Editions
Orchestrahl	Orchestra	1985–89	Amphion
Trois Scènes	Orchestra	1994–95	Amphion
Concerto	Cello and orchestra	1999–2000	Amphion
Concerto	Piano and orchestra	2003–05	Éditions Durand-Salabert (for hire)
L'espace du souffle	Orchestra	2007	Éditions Durand-Salabert (for hire)
Après...Ein 'Es praeludium'	Two horns and string orchestra	2008	Éditions Durand-Salabert (for hire)
Oeil de fumée	Voice and piano	1955	Amphion
Oeil de fumée	Voice and orchestra	1957	Amphion
Strophe	Soprano and orchestra	1965–66	Amphion
Cette étoile enseigne à s'incliner	Men's voices, two pianos, instruments, and tape	1970	Heugel
Recitatif, air et variation	Twelve voices	1970	Universal Editions
D'un désastre obscur	Mezzo-soprano and clarinet	1971	Universal Editions
D'un espace déployé	Soprano, two pianos, and two orchestral groups	1972–73	Universal Editions
Après... D'un désastre obscur	Mezzo-soprano and ensemble	1976	Universal Editions
Shin'Anim Sha'Ananim	Mezzo-soprano, cello, clarinet, and ensemble	1979	Universal Editions
Une Saison en enfer	Soprano, piano, percussion, and tape	1980	Éditions Durand-Salabert (for hire)
Missa cum jubilo	Vocal quartet, children's choir, mixed choir, and orchestra	1981–83	Universal Editions
Choros	Contra-tenor, tenor, bass, grand mixed choir, and orchestra	1989	Amphion
Quatre Mélodies	Soprano and orchestra	2003–05	Éditions Durand-Salabert
Trois Mélodies	Soprano and piano	2003–04	unpublished
Dessin animé	Baritone and cello	2003	unpublished
Litanies pour Ronchamp	Two male singers, vocal ensemble, percussion, and string quartet	2004–05	unpublished
Le Premier Cercle	Opera in four acts	1996–99	Éditions Durand-Salabert

Cultural offices
Preceded by Charles Bruck	Music directors, Orchestre philharmonique de Radio France; 1976–1981	Succeeded by Marek Janowski
