= Domaine musical =

The Domaine musical was a concert society established by Pierre Boulez and Suzanne Tézenas in Paris, which was active from 1954 to 1973. Composers represented at its concerts included Boulez, Karlheinz Stockhausen, Olivier Messiaen, Luciano Berio, John Cage, Sylvano Bussotti, Mauricio Kagel, Hans Werner Henze, Henri Pousseur, Ernst Krenek, Gilbert Amy, Peter Schat and Gilles Tremblay, Betsy Jolas as well as earlier composers considered part of the Modernist movement in music. Its regular performers included the pianists Claude Helffer, Paul Jacobs, Yvonne Loriod and Marcelle Mercenier.
