= Andy Williams' Newest Hits =

Compilation album by Andy Williams
- Released: 1966
- Recorded: 1962–1965
- Genre: Traditional pop; vocal pop; AM pop; standards; soft rock
- Length: 31:38
- Label: Columbia
- Producer: Robert Mersey

Andy Williams chronology
Merry Christmas (1965)	Andy Williams' Newest Hits (1966)	May Each Day (1966)

Andy Williams' Newest Hits is a compilation album by American pop singer Andy Williams that was released early in 1966 by Columbia Records and was the first LP to compile the singer's Columbia material. Seven of the 12 tracks had reached the charts in Billboard magazine, and another had been released as a single in the UK. Three album cuts were also included along with a recent B-side.

The album debuted on the Billboard Top LP's chart in the issue dated February 5, 1966, and remained there for 23 weeks, peaking at number 23. it also debuted on the Cashbox albums chart in the issue dated January 29, of that year, and remained on the chart for in a total of 24 weeks, peaking at number 20. A similar collection entitled May Each Day entered the UK album chart the following month, on March 19, and reached number 11 over the course of six weeks. While the cover photo and design of the two releases were the same, there were only five songs that they had in common.

Andy Williams' Newest Hits was issued on compact disc as one of two albums on one CD by Collectables Records on February 5, 2002, alongside Williams's 1962 Columbia release, Warm and Willing. Collectables included the CD in a box set entitled Classic Album Collection, Vol. 2, which contains 15 of his studio albums and two compilations, released on November 29, 2002.

== Reception ==
Professional ratings
Review scores
Source	Rating
AllMusic	2.5/5 stars
The Encyclopedia of Popular Music	3/5 stars

Billboard magazine described the album as "one of the finest romantic mood albums in the Williams catalog."

== Track listing ==
=== Side one ===
1. "I'll Remember You" (Kui Lee) – 2:31
  - recorded 10/25/65 and released on 11/1/65 as the B-side of "Quiet Nights of Quiet Stars (Corcovado)"
2. "Almost There" from I'd Rather Be Rich (Jerry Keller, Gloria Shayne) – 2:59
  - rec. 2/28/64, rel. 8/25/64; Billboard Hot 100: #67, Easy Listening: #12
3. "A Fool Never Learns" (Sonny Curtis) – 2:01
  - rec. 11/1/63, rel. 12/16/63; Billboard Hot 100: #13, Easy Listening: #4
4. "Noelle" (Edward Pola, George Wyle) – 2:48
  - rec. 11/7/63 for his album The Wonderful World of Andy Williams
5. "On the Street Where You Live" from My Fair Lady (Alan Jay Lerner, Frederick Loewe) – 3:12
  - rec. 5/7/64, rel. 8/25/64; Billboard Hot 100: #28, Easy Listening: #3
6. "Red Roses for a Blue Lady" (Roy C. Bennett, Sid Tepper) – 2:27
  - rec. 2/20/65 for the album Andy Williams' Dear Heart

=== Side two ===
1. "Quiet Nights of Quiet Stars (Corcovado)" (Antonio Carlos Jobim, Gene Lees) – 3:00
  - rec. 5/18/65 rel. 11/1/65; Billboard Hot 100: #92, Easy Listening: #18
2. "The Wonderful World of the Young" (Roy C. Bennett, Sid Tepper) – 2:31
  - rec. 1/12/62 rel. 2/9/62; Billboard Hot 100: #99
3. "Don't You Believe It" (Burt Bacharach, Bob Hilliard) – 2:29
  - rec. 1/12/62 rel. 8/10/62; Billboard Hot 100: #39, Easy Listening: #15
4. "...and Roses and Roses" (Dorival Caymmi, Ray Gilbert)) – 2:25
  - rec. 2/9/65 rel. 3/22/65; Billboard Hot 100: #36, Easy Listening: #4
5. "Emily" from The Americanization of Emily (Johnny Mandel, Johnny Mercer) – 2:22
  - rec. 8/19/64 for the album Andy Williams' Dear Heart
6. "May Each Day" from The Andy Williams Show (Mort Green, George Wyle) – 2:54
  - rec. 1/16/63 for his album Days of Wine and Roses and Other TV Requests

== Personnel ==
- Andy Williams – vocalist
- Robert Mersey – producer, arranger, conductor

== Bibliography ==
- Whitburn, Joel (2007). Joel Whitburn Presents Billboard Top Adult Songs, 1961-2006. Record Research Inc. ISBN 0-89820-169-1.
- Whitburn, Joel (2009). Joel Whitburn's Top Pop Singles, 1955–2008. Record Research Inc. ISBN 0-89820-180-2.
- Whitburn, Joel (2010). Joel Whitburn Presents Top Pop Albums (7th ed.). Record Research Inc. ISBN 0-89820-183-7.
