= Andy (2001 album) =

Compilation album by Andy Williams
- Released: January 22, 2001
- Genre: Traditional pop; vocal pop; standards; AM Pop; early pop/rock; soft rock; film music; soundtracks
- Label: Crimson

Andy Williams chronology
The Very Best of Andy Williams (2000)	Andy (2001)	The Essential Andy Williams (2002)

Andy is a compilation album by American pop singer Andy Williams that was released by Crimson on January 22, 2001, and consisted of live recordings of some of his hits as well as five songs he had never recorded before -- "Call Me", "Do Nothing till You Hear from Me", "Moonlight in Vermont", "Summer Wind", and "What the World Needs Now Is Love". The recordings date from concerts recorded between February 1963 and February 1972.

On July 22, 2013, the British Phonographic Industry awarded the album with Gold certification for sales of 100,000 units.

== Track listing ==
=== Disc one ===
1. "Almost There" from I'd Rather Be Rich (Jerry Keller, Gloria Shayne) – 3:15
2. "Can't Help Falling in Love" (Luigi Creatore, Hugo Peretti, George David Weiss) – 1:45
3. "Somewhere" from West Side Story (Leonard Bernstein, Stephen Sondheim) – 2:40
4. "Dreamsville" (Ray Evans, Jay Livingston, Henry Mancini) – 2:24
5. "I Left My Heart in San Francisco" (George Cory, Douglass Cross) – 2:49
6. "Do Nothing till You Hear from Me" (Duke Ellington, Bob Russell) – 3:28
7. "Who Can I Turn To (When Nobody Needs Me)" from The Roar of the Greasepaint – The Smell of the Crowd (Leslie Bricusse, Anthony Newley) – 2:26
8. "The Shadow of Your Smile (Love Theme from The Sandpiper)" from The Sandpiper (Johnny Mandel, Paul Francis Webster) – 3:02
9. "If Ever I Would Leave You" from Camelot (Alan Jay Lerner, Frederick Loewe) – 3:50
10. "Quiet Nights of Quiet Stars (Corcovado)" (Antonio Carlos Jobim, Gene Lees) – 2:52
11. "Danny Boy" (Frederick Edward Weatherly) – 3:22
12. "Autumn" from Cyrano (Richard Maltby Jr., David Shire) – 3:41
13. "More Than You Know" from the 1929 musical Great Day (Edward Eliscu, Billy Rose, Vincent Youmans) – 2:55
14. "Emily" from The Americanization of Emily (Johnny Mandel, Johnny Mercer) – 2:46
15. "May Each Day" from The Andy Williams Show (Mort Green, George Wyle) – 3:07
16. "Can't Take My Eyes Off You" (Bob Crewe, Bob Gaudio) – 3:08

=== Disc two ===
1. "Moon River" from Breakfast at Tiffany's (Mancini, Mercer) – 3:09
2. "Spanish Harlem" (Jerry Leiber, Phil Spector) – 2:45
3. "Call Me" (Tony Hatch) – 2:15
4. "Dear Heart" from Dear Heart (Ray Evans, Jay Livingston, Henry Mancini) – 2:33
5. "The Way You Look Tonight" from Swing Time (Dorothy Fields, Jerome Kern) – 4:03
6. "Try to Remember" from The Fantasticks (Tom Jones, Harvey Schmidt) – 2:52
7. "I'll Remember You" (Kui Lee) – 2:30
8. "Meditation" with Antonio Carlos Jobim (Norman Gimbel, Antonio Carlos Jobim, Newton Mendonça) – 2:49
9. "God Only Knows" (Tony Asher, Brian Wilson) – 2:35
10. "Yesterday" (John Lennon, Paul McCartney) – 2:47
11. "Alfie" from Alfie (Hal David, Burt Bacharach) – 2:43
12. "Summer Wind" (Heinz Meyer, Hans Bradtke, Johnny Mercer) – 2:47
13. "What the World Needs Now Is Love" (Burt Bacharach, Hal David) – 2:49
14. "Days of Wine and Roses" from Days of Wine and Roses (Mancini, Mercer) – 2:42
15. "Moonlight in Vermont" (John Blackburn, Karl Suessdorf) – 2:54
