= In the Lounge with... =

In the Lounge with…

Compilation album by Andy Williams
- Released: 1999
- Recorded: 1963–1970
- Genre: Vocal; pop/rock; easy listening
- Label: Sony Music Entertainment

Andy Williams chronology
The Love Songs (1997)	In the Lounge with… (1999)	The Very Best of Andy Williams (2000)

In the Lounge with… is a compilation album by American pop singer Andy Williams released by Sony Music Entertainment in 1999.

The album peaked at number 39 on the UK albums chart in April 1999. On 22 July 2013, the British Phonographic Industry awarded the album a silver certification for sales of 60,000 units.

== Reception ==
Professional ratings
Review scores
Source	Rating
AllMusic	3.5/5 stars

John Bush of AllMusic found that this collection was a good representation of the singer's work. "Despite the conscious kitsch in effect with the title, the Andy Williams compilation In the Lounge with... collects some of his breeziest pop crossovers during the late '60s, whether Brazilian or Broadway or folk or the stray rock cover. Unlike most jazz-era vocalists (those who had debuted in the '40s or '50s), Williams had no trouble crossing over. He gave the material the proper amount of respect -- never too much nor too little -- and his choices for recording and arrangements were quite good (evinced here by 'Windy,' 'Spooky,' 'Up, Up and Away,' 'Sunny,' 'Raindrops Keep Fallin' on My Head')." Bush also warned, "Obviously, this is going to be musical furniture for many a hipster or wannabe, but don't discount the power of Andy Williams's style and finesse. The same talents of easy elegance that brought 'Canadian Sunset' to the charts are the same that appear on 'Pretty Butterfly.'"

== Track listing ==
1. "Music to Watch Girls By" (Tony Velona, Sid Ramin) – 2:38
2. "Can't Take My Eyes Off You" (Bob Crewe, Bob Gaudio) – 3:15
3. "Windy" (Ruthann Friedman) – 2:25
4. "Up, Up and Away" (Jimmy Webb) – 2:36
5. "Wives and Lovers" (Burt Bacharach, Hal David) – 2:20
6. "The Look of Love" from Casino Royale (Bacharach, David) – 2:55
7. "Spooky" (Buddy Buie, James B. Cobb, Jr., Harry Middlebrooks, Mike Shapiro) – 3:18
8. "Kisses Sweeter Than Wine" (Paul Campbell, Joel Newman) – 2:52
9. "Pretty Butterfly" (Mario Albanese, Loryn Deane, Ciro Pereira, Sunny Skylar) – 2:16
10. "What Now, My Love?" (Gilbert Bécaud, Pierre Delanoë, Carl Sigman) – 2:05
11. "The Face I Love" (Ray Gilbert, Carlos Pingarilho, Marcos Valle, Paulo Sérgio Valle) – 2:03
12. "So Nice (Summer Samba) " (Norman Gimbel, Marcos Valle, Paulo Sérgio Valle) – 2:37
13. "Quiet Nights of Quiet Stars (Corcovado)" (Antonio Carlos Jobim, Gene Lees) – 3:00
14. "How Insensitive " performed with Antonio Carlos Jobim (Vinícius de Moraes, Norman Gimbel, Antonio Carlos Jobim) – 2:40
15. "Somethin' Stupid" (C. Carson Parks) – 2:59
16. "It's a Most Unusual Day" from A Date with Judy (Harold Adamson, Jimmy McHugh) – 2:04
17. "You Are My Sunshine" (Jimmie Davis, Charles Mitchell) – 2:29
18. "Almost There" from I'd Rather Be Rich (Jerry Keller, Gloria Shayne) – 2:59
19. "It's So Easy" (Dor Lee, Dave Watkins) – 2:29
20. "Sunny" (Bobby Hebb) – 3:16
21. "More Today Than Yesterday" performed with The Osmond Brothers (Pat Upton) – 2:58
22. "Happy Heart" (James Last, Jackie Rae) – 3:15
23. "Can't Get Used to Losing You" (Jerome "Doc" Pomus, Mort Shuman) – 2:25
24. "Moon River" from Breakfast at Tiffany's (Henry Mancini, Johnny Mercer) – 2:46
25. "Raindrops Keep Fallin' on My Head" from Butch Cassidy and the Sundance Kid (Burt Bacharach, Hal David) – 3:11
