= The Very Best of Andy Williams (2000 album) =

Compilation album by Andy Williams
- Released: February 7, 2000
- Recorded: 1956–1975
- Genre: Traditional pop; vocal pop; standards; AM Pop; early pop/rock; soft rock; film music; soundtracks
- Label: Sony Music Entertainment

Andy Williams chronology
In the Lounge with... (1999)	The Very Best of Andy Williams (2000)	Andy (2001)

The Very Best of Andy Williams is a compilation album by American pop singer Andy Williams that was released by Sony Music Entertainment on February 7, 2000.

The album first appeared on the UK album chart on February 19 of that year and remained there for nine weeks, peaking at number 27.

On July 22, 2013, the British Phonographic Industry awarded the album with Silver certification for sales of 60,000 units.

== Track listing ==
=== Disc one ===
1. "Music to Watch Girls By" (Tony Velona, Sid Ramin) – 2:38
2. "House of Bamboo" (William Crompton, Norman Murrells) – 2:06
3. "Spooky" (Buddy Buie, James B. Cobb, Jr., Harry Middlebrooks, Mike Shapiro) – 3:18
4. "Happy Heart" (James Last, Jackie Rae) – 3:15
5. "Up, Up and Away" (Jimmy Webb) – 2:36
6. "Born Free" from Born Free (Don Black, John Barry) – 2:27
7. "The Impossible Dream (The Quest)" from Man of La Mancha (Joe Darion, Mitch Leigh) – 2:39
8. "Love Theme from Romeo and Juliet (A Time for Us)" from Romeo and Juliet (Larry Kusik, Nino Rota, Eddie Snyder) – 2:35
9. "Almost There" from I'd Rather Be Rich (Jerry Keller, Gloria Shayne) – 2:59
10. "Call Me Irresponsible" from Papa's Delicate Condition (Sammy Cahn, Jimmy Van Heusen) – 3:10
11. "I'm All Smiles" (Michael Leonard, Herbert Martin) – 2:25
12. "Can't Get Used to Losing You" (Jerome "Doc" Pomus, Mort Shuman) – 2:25
13. "It's So Easy" (Dor Lee, Dave Watkins) – 2:29
14. "Can't Help Falling in Love" (Luigi Creatore, Hugo Peretti, George David Weiss) – 3:15
15. "MacArthur Park" (Webb) – 5:03
16. "Home Lovin' Man" (Roger Cook, Roger Greenaway, Tony Macaulay) – 3:10
17. "(Where Do I Begin) Love Story" (Francis Lai, Carl Sigman) – 3:10
18. "Whistling Away The Dark" from Darling Lili (Henry Mancini, Johnny Mercer) – 3:19
19. "Speak Softly Love (Love Theme from 'The Godfather')" (Kusik, Rota) – 3:05
20. "Getting over You" (Tony Hazzard) – 3:23
21. "The Other Side of Me" (Howard Greenfield, Neil Sedaka) – 3:20
22. "You Lay So Easy on My Mind" (Charles W. Fields, Bobby G. Rice, Donald L. Riis) – 2:41
23. "Abraham, Martin and John" (Dick Holler) – 3:43
24. "Amazing Grace" (John Newton) – 3:27
25. "Solitaire" (Phil Cody, Sedaka) – 4:22

=== Disc two ===
1. "Moon River" from Breakfast at Tiffany's (Mancini, Mercer) – 2:46
2. "Can't Take My Eyes Off You" (Bob Crewe, Bob Gaudio) – 3:15
3. "On the Street Where You Live" from My Fair Lady (Alan Jay Lerner, Frederick Loewe) – 3:12
4. "Embraceable You" from Girl Crazy (George Gershwin, Ira Gershwin) – 3:40
5. "Canadian Sunset" (Norman Gimbel, Eddie Heywood) – 2:37
6. "Dreamsville" (Ray Evans, Jay Livingston, Mancini) – 2:59
7. "The Shadow of Your Smile (Love Theme from The Sandpiper)" from The Sandpiper (Johnny Mandel, Paul Francis Webster) – 3:04
8. "In the Arms of Love" from What Did You Do in the War, Daddy? (Evans, Livingston, Mancini) – 2:56
9. "Under Paris Skies" (Jean Andre Brun, Kim Gannon, Hubert Giraud) – 3:03
10. "April in Paris" (Vernon Duke, E.Y. "Yip" Harburg) – 3:38
11. "Charade" (Mancini, Mercer) – 2:35
12. "Days of Wine and Roses" from Days of Wine and Roses (Mancini, Mercer) – 2:48
13. "The Hawaiian Wedding Song" (Al Hoffman, Charles E. King, Dick Manning) – 2:29
14. "Unchained Melody" (Hy Zaret, Alex North) – 3:16
15. "Danny Boy" (Frederick Edward Weatherly) – 2:56
16. "The Village of St. Bernadette" (Eula Parker) – 3:22
17. "Stranger on the Shore" (Acker Bilk) – 2:50
18. "Do You Mind?" (Lionel Bart) – 2:17
19. "(In the Summertime) You Don't Want My Love" (Roger Miller) – 2:16
20. "A Fool Never Learns" (Sonny Curtis) – 2:01
21. "I Like Your Kind of Love" (Melvin Endsley) – 2:30
22. "Butterfly" (Bernie Lowe, Kal Mann) – 2:21
23. "Lonely Street" (Carl Belew, Kenny Sowder, W.S. Stevenson) – 2:46
24. "September Song" (Maxwell Anderson, Kurt Weill) – 3:00
25. "May Each Day" from The Andy Williams Show (Mort Green, George Wyle) – 2:54
