= May Each Day =

Compilation album by Andy Williams
- Released: 1966
- Recorded: 1956–1965
- Genre: Traditional pop; vocal pop; AM pop; standards; soft rock
- Length: 32:24
- Label: CBS Records

Andy Williams chronology
Andy Williams' Newest Hits (1966)	May Each Day (1966)	The Shadow of Your Smile (1966)

Professional ratings
Review scores
Source	Rating
Record Mirror	4/5 stars
The Encyclopedia of Popular Music	3/5 stars

May Each Day is a compilation album by American pop singer Andy Williams that was released in the UK in early 1966 by the CBS Records division of Columbia. A similar collection titled Andy Williams' Newest Hits had the same cover photo and design, but there were only five songs that they had in common. Whereas that release focused exclusively on Columbia recordings, May Each Day also included songs that Williams cut during his time with Cadence Records, and while several of the tracks here were chart hits in the US, only the title track reached the singles chart in the UK.

The’May Each Day compilation first appeared on the UK album chart on March 19 of that year and remained there for six weeks, peaking at number 11.

The title song from this compilation entered the UK singles chart on February 26 of that year and eventually made it to number 19 during its eight weeks there. The album also marks the only LP appearance of "Loved One", which was the B-side of "Ain't It True" and was included on the 2003 Williams collection from Collectables Records entitled B Sides and Rarities.

== Track listing ==
=== Side one ===
1. "Canadian Sunset" (Norman Gimbel, Eddie Heywood) – 2:37
  - recorded 7/2/56
2. "I'll Remember You" (Kui Lee) – 2:31
  - rec. 10/25/65
3. "The Bilbao Song" (Bertolt Brecht, Johnny Mercer, Kurt Weill) – 2:15
  - rec. 3/9/61
4. "Don't Go to Strangers" (Redd Evans, Arthur Kent, David Mann) – 2:56
  - rec. 10/17/60
5. "Quiet Nights of Quiet Stars (Corcovado)" (Antônio Carlos Jobim, Gene Lees) – 3:00
  - rec. 5/18/65
6. "May Each Day" (Mort Green, George Wyle) – 2:54
  - rec. 1/16/63; UK singles chart: #19 (1966)

=== Side two ===
1. "Don't You Believe It" (Burt Bacharach, Bob Hilliard) – 2:29
  - rec. 1/12/62
2. "...and Roses and Roses" (Dorival Caymmi, Ray Gilbert)) – 2:25
  - rec. 2/9/65
3. "Loved One" (Carolyn Leigh, Jack Segal) – 2:49
  - rec. 6/30/65
4. "The Village of St. Bernadette" (Eula Parker) – 3:22
  - rec. 11/19/59
5. "Lonely Street" (Carl Belew, Kenny Sowder, W.S. Stevenson) – 2:46
  - rec. 8/23/59
6. "How Wonderful to Know" (Salvatore d'Esposito, Kermit Goell, Domenico Titomanlio) – 2:21
  - rec. 3/9/61

== Personnel ==
- Andy Williams - vocalist
