= The Best of Andy Williams (1996 album) =

Compilation album by Andy Williams
- Released: 1996
- Recorded: 1958–1974
- Genre: Traditional pop; vocal pop; standards; AM Pop; early pop/rock; soft rock; film music; soundtracks
- Label: Sony Music Entertainment

Andy Williams chronology
| We Need a Little Christmas (1995) | The Best of Andy Williams (1996) | The Love Songs (1997) |

The Best of Andy Williams is a compilation album by American pop singer Andy Williams that was released by Sony Music Entertainment in 1996.

On July 22, 2013, the British Phonographic Industry awarded the album with Silver certification for sales of 60,000 units.

== Track listing ==
1. "Moon River" from Breakfast at Tiffany's (Henry Mancini, Johnny Mercer) – 2:46
2. "Days of Wine and Roses" from Days of Wine and Roses (Henry Mancini, Johnny Mercer) – 2:48
3. "The More I See You" from Diamond Horseshoe (Mack Gordon, Harry Warren) – 2:25
4. "The Hawaiian Wedding Song" (Al Hoffman, Charles E. King, Dick Manning) - 2:29
5. "Solitaire" (Phil Cody, Neil Sedaka) - 4:22
6. "The Look of Love" from Casino Royale (Burt Bacharach, Hal David) – 2:55
7. "Music to Watch Girls By" (Tony Velona, Sid Ramin) – 2:38
8. "Can't Take My Eyes Off You" (Bob Crewe, Bob Gaudio) – 3:15
9. "It's a Most Unusual Day" from A Date with Judy (Harold Adamson, Jimmy McHugh) – 2:04
10. "Happy Heart" (James Last, Jackie Rae) – 3:15
11. "Can't Get Used to Losing You" (Jerome "Doc" Pomus, Mort Shuman) – 2:25
12. "You Lay So Easy on My Mind" (Charles W. Fields, Bobby G. Rice, Donald L. Riis) - 2:41
13. "Love Theme from Romeo and Juliet (A Time for Us)" from Romeo and Juliet (Larry Kusik, Nino Rota, Eddie Snyder) – 2:35
14. "In the Arms of Love" from What Did You Do in the War, Daddy? (Ray Evans, Jay Livingston, Henry Mancini) – 2:56
15. "Danny Boy" (Frederick Edward Weatherly) – 2:56
16. "May Each Day" from The Andy Williams Show (Mort Green, George Wyle) – 2:54
