= The Essential Andy Williams =

Compilation album by Andy Williams
- Released: 2002
- Recorded: 1958–1972, 2002
- Genre: Traditional pop; vocal pop; standards; AM Pop; early pop/rock; soft rock; film music; soundtracks
- Label: Sony Music Entertainment

Andy Williams chronology
Andy (2001)	The Essential Andy Williams (2002)	B Sides and Rarities (2003)

The Essential Andy Williams is a compilation album by American pop singer Andy Williams that was released in the UK by Sony Music Entertainment in 2002. The label also released a two-CD compilation with the same title in the U.S. & Australia in 2013 that had a different cover photo and contained 36 tracks.

The lead track from the UK compilation, a new recording of "Can't Take My Eyes Off You" performed with Denise van Outen, was released as a single in the UK and debuted the week of June 29, 2002, on the UK singles chart, where it reached number 23 over the course of seven weeks.

This compilation first appeared on the UK album chart on July 6 of that year and remained there for four weeks, peaking at number 32.

On July 22, 2013, the British Phonographic Industry awarded the album with Gold certification for sales of 100,000 units.

== Track listing ==
1. "Can't Take My Eyes Off You" performed with Denise van Outen (Bob Crewe, Bob Gaudio) – 3:43
2. "Music to Watch Girls By" (Tony Velona, Sid Ramin) – 2:38
3. "Aquarius/Let the Sunshine In" from Hair; performed with The Osmond Brothers (Galt MacDermot, James Rado, Gerome Ragni) – 3:51
4. "Up, Up and Away" (Jimmy Webb) – 2:36
5. "Happy Heart" (James Last, Jackie Rae) – 3:15
6. "The Look of Love" from Casino Royale (Burt Bacharach, Hal David) – 2:55
7. "Moon River" from Breakfast at Tiffany's (Henry Mancini, Johnny Mercer) – 2:46
8. "Spooky" (Buddy Buie, James B. Cobb Jr., Harry Middlebrooks, Mike Shapiro) – 3:18
9. "Can't Get Used to Losing You" (Jerome "Doc" Pomus, Mort Shuman) – 2:25
10. "It's So Easy" (Dor Lee, Dave Watkins) – 2:29
11. "House of Bamboo" (William Crompton, Norman Murrells) – 2:06
12. "Here Comes That Rainy Day Feeling Again" (Roger Cook, Roger Greenaway, Tony Macaulay) – 2:33
13. "Speak Softly Love (Love Theme from 'The Godfather')" (Larry Kusik, Nino Rota) – 3:05
14. "Born Free" from Born Free (Don Black, John Barry) – 2:27
15. "Danny Boy" (Frederick Edward Weatherly) – 2:56
16. "Almost There" from I'd Rather Be Rich (Jerry Keller, Gloria Shayne) – 2:59
17. "We've Only Just Begun" (Roger Nichols, Paul Williams) – 3:15
18. "One Day of Your Life" (Howard Greenfield, Neil Sedaka) – 2:30
19. "I Think I Love You" (Tony Romeo) – 2:42
20. "Home Lovin' Man" (Roger Cook, Roger Greenaway, Tony Macaulay) – 3:10
21. "(Where Do I Begin) Love Story" (Francis Lai, Carl Sigman) – 3:10
22. "Somethin' Stupid" (C. Carson Parks) – 2:59
23. "Raindrops Keep Fallin' on My Head" from Butch Cassidy and the Sundance Kid (Bacharach, David) – 3:11
24. "Can't Take My Eyes Off You" (Crewe, Gaudio) – 3:15
