= Andy Williams' Dear Heart =

Studio album by Andy Williams
- Released: 1965
- Recorded: 1965
- Genres: Traditional pop; vocal pop; early pop/rock
- Length: 31:49
- Label: Columbia
- Producer: Robert Mersey

Andy Williams chronology
The Great Songs from "My Fair Lady" and Other Broadway Hits (1964)	Andy Williams' Dear Heart (1965)	Canadian Sunset (1965)

Alternative cover
- UK Cover

Singles from Andy Williams' Dear Heart
- 1. "Almost There" Released: August 25, 1964; 2. "Dear Heart" Released: November 9, 1964

Andy Williams' Dear Heart is the sixteenth studio album by American pop singer Andy Williams and was released in the spring of 1965 by Columbia Records and was the last of his Columbia releases that remained exclusively within the realm of traditional pop. After covering two Beatles hits on his next non-holiday studio album, The Shadow of Your Smile, he would try out samba music on In the Arms of Love, aim for a much younger crowd with "Music to Watch Girls By" on Born Free, and focus more on contemporary material on subsequent albums.

This album debuted on Billboard magazine's Top LP's chart in the issue dated April 10, 1965 and remained on the album chart for 65 weeks, peaking at number four. it also debuted on the Cashbox albums chart in the issue dated April 7, 1965, and remained on the chart for 47 weeks, peaking at number five. The name of the album was changed to Andy Williams' Almost There for its release in the UK, where it became Williams's first album chart entry, spending 46 weeks there and peaking at number four. (Two of his previous albums, Days of Wine and Roses and Other TV Requests—which was retitled Can't Get Used to Losing You and Other Requests for its UK release—and The Great Songs from "My Fair Lady" and Other Broadway Hits, appeared on the album chart in the UK following the success of this album.)

Andy Williams' Dear Heart received Gold certification from the Recording Industry Association of America on July 30, 1965. This was Williams's sixth album to receive this award as well as the one to do so the fastest thus far in terms of the amount of time between chart debut and certification, having accomplished this feat in less than four months as compared to the previous recordholder, Days of Wine and Roses and Other TV Requests, which did so in five months.

Williams's acting role in the 1964 film I'd Rather Be Rich included a performance of the original song "Almost There", which makes its first album appearance here. As the B-side of "On the Street Where You Live" (the single from his last album), "Almost There" debuted on the Billboard Hot 100 in the issue of the magazine dated November 14, 1964, eventually reaching number 67 during its five-week stay. It performed even better on the Easy Listening (or Adult Contemporary) chart, going as high as number 12 during its four weeks there. and number 100 on the Cashbox singles chart, spending its only week on the chart at number 100. The song's biggest success was in the UK, where it spent three weeks at number two during a 17-week run on the singles chart. This album's A-side, "Dear Heart", written for the 1964 Glenn Ford/Geraldine Page movie of the same name, debuted on the pop and Easy Listening charts just two weeks later and spent 11 weeks on each of them, peaking at number 24 on the Hot 100 and spending a week at number two Easy Listening. and number 15 on the Cashbox singles chart, during its 12 weeks there.

The album was released on compact disc as one of two albums on one CD by Collectables Records on March 23, 1999, along with Williams's 1965 Columbia album, The Shadow of Your Smile. Andy Williams' Dear Heart was included in a box set entitled Classic Album Collection, Vol. 1, which contains 17 of his studio albums and three compilations and was released on June 26, 2001.

== Reception ==
Professional ratings
Review scores
Source	Rating
Allmusic	3/5 stars
The Encyclopedia of Popular Music	4/5 stars
Record Mirror	4/5 stars

Allmusic's William Ruhlmann liked the album: "Williams applied his usual warm, smooth vocal style to all the songs, with string-filled arrangements that emphasized the melodies." He also described the LP as "a well-assembled collection of contemporary material in what had become Williams's patented style."

Billboard magazine felt that Williams "performed in his inimitable rich, warm style" and asserted that his "interpretations of 'I'm All Smiles' and 'Who Can I Turn To?' are outstanding." Cashbox gave a positive review, saying "his usual fine form relaxedly gliding through lush and luscious versions of “You’re Nobody ’Til Somebody Loves You” Record World notes "Williams' gives his flexible voice a strong work-out and proves once again his position at the higher regions of today's singing peaks."

Variety notes "Williams Focusses on a medley of current hits and some evergeens, all delivered with a warm, east-does-it style against big orchestral, and occasional choral, backgrounds." Record Mirror described the album as "a soft-tone selection" American Record Guide described the album as "tranquilly", and notes "Williams does a nice job on Emily and an atttractive song from the [then] forthcoming The Yearling, 'I'm All Smiles', which is also beginning to appear here and there on records."

Both Record Mirror and The Encyclopedia of Popular Music gave the album a four-star ratings, while getting a lower three-star rating from AllMusic.

== Track listing ==
=== Side one ===
1. "Red Roses for a Blue Lady" (Roy C. Bennett, Roy Brodsky, Sid Tepper) – 2:27
2. "It Had to Be You" (Isham Jones, Gus Kahn) – 2:41
3. "I Can't Stop Loving You" (Don Gibson) – 2:27
4. "Till" (Charles Danvers, Carl Sigman) – 3:05
5. "I'm All Smiles" (Michael Leonard, Herbert Martin) – 2:25
6. "Who Can I Turn To (When Nobody Needs Me)" from The Roar of the Greasepaint – The Smell of the Crowd (Leslie Bricusse, Anthony Newley) – 2:24

=== Side two ===
1. "You're Nobody till Somebody Loves You" (James Cavanaugh, Russ Morgan, Larry Stock) – 2:37
2. "Emily" from The Americanization of Emily (Johnny Mandel, Johnny Mercer) – 2:22
3. "Almost There" from I'd Rather Be Rich (Jerry Keller, Gloria Shayne) – 2:59
4. "My Carousel" (Kenny Rankin, Yvonne Rankin) – 2:28
5. "Everybody Loves Somebody" (Sam Coslow, Ken Lane, Irving Taylor) – 3:05
6. "Dear Heart" from Dear Heart (Ray Evans, Jay Livingston, Henry Mancini) – 2:55

== Charts ==
Chart (1965)	Peak position
US Top LPs (Billboard)	4
US Cashbox	5
UK Albums Chart	4

=== Singles ===
Year	Title	U.S. Hot 100	U.S. Cashbox	U.S. AC	UK Singles
1964	"Almost There"	67	100	12	2
1964	"Dear Heart"	24	15	2	-

== Personnel ==
From the liner notes for the original album:

- Andy Williams – vocals
- Robert Mersey – arranger, conductor, producer
- Don Heckman – liner notes
- Frank Bez – cover photo

== Bibliography ==
- Whitburn, Joel (1985), Joel Whitburn's Top Pop Albums, 1955-1985, Record Research Inc., ISBN 0-89820-054-7
- Whitburn, Joel (1993), Joel Whitburn's Top Adult Contemporary, 1961-1993, Record Research Inc., ISBN 0-89820-099-7
- Whitburn, Joel (1999), Joel Whitburn's Top Pop Singles, 1955-1999, Record Research Inc., ISBN 0-89820-140-3
- Whitburn, Joel (2010), Joel Whitburn Presents Top Pop Albums, Seventh Edition, Record Research Inc., ISBN 978-0-89820-183-3
- Hoffmann, Frank W (1988), The Cash box album charts, 1955-1974, Scarecrow Press, ISBN 0-810-82005-6
- Downey, Pat (1994), Cash box pop singles charts, 1950-1993, Libraries Unlimited, ISBN 1-56308-316-7
- Larkin, Colin (2007), The Encyclopedia of Popular Music, Omnibus Press, ISBN 9-7818-4609-8567
