= Nobody (soundtrack) =

Nobody (Music from the Motion Picture)

Film score by David Buckley
- Released: March 19, 2021
- Genre: Film score
- Length: 25:05
- Label: Back Lot Music
- Producer: David Buckley

David Buckley chronology
Unhinged (2020)	Nobody (2021)	The Sandman (2022)

Nobody (Music from the Motion Picture) is the film score composed by David Buckley to the 2021 film Nobody directed by Ilya Naishuller, starring Bob Odenkirk. The score was released under the Back Lot Music label on March 19, 2021

== Background ==
David Buckley composed the score for Nobody. He was one of the few composers recommended by Universal Pictures executives during the pre-production, having worked on few projects for the company. Buckley then met the director Ilya Naishuller and discussed about the music. As Ilya being a musician, having played for bands, Buckley felt that he was able to be quite articulate about the musical likes and dislikes, and had shared a creative rapport together. Buckley wanted to compose the score for Nobody as he had co-composed for action films The Town (2010) and Jason Bourne (2016) and worked as a sole composer for other action films. He was impressed by the tight-pace narration within 90 minutes and the "heightened John Wick violence to it. But on the other hand, there's also a kind of real human dilemma." Buckley also liked the integration of the songs throughout the script.

During his initial discussions with Ilya, Buckley had designed a sonic palette that involved guitar, keyboard, drums and percussions and does not involve orchestra as the script did not demand "lush, exciting symphonic music". This also proved to be a blessing as recording an orchestra was quite challenging during the COVID-19 pandemic and could take a longer time due to the restrictions, affecting the post-production. He recorded the score with several musicians during the pandemic, and Buckley was present at the recording room with Ilya monitoring the process through Zoom.

== Release ==
The soundtrack was released through Back Lot Music on March 19, 2021, a week prior to the film's release in United States.

== Track listing ==
No.	Title	Length
1.	"Suburban Disruption"	3:27
2.	"They Know, I Know, You Know"	3:01
3.	"I'm Gonna F**k You Up"	2:12
4.	"We Need a Cat"	1:47
5.	"The Obshak"	2:59
6.	"Kill Box"	2:00
7.	"We Reap What We Sow"	1:30
8.	"The Pillow Wall"	1:10
9.	"Everyone Dies"	3:44
10.	"Nobody"	3:15
Total length:		25:05

== Reception ==
Owen Gleiberman of Variety called the score "bombastic", while John DeFore of The Hollywood Reporter called it "engaging". Matt Taylor of The Indiependent wrote "Composer David Buckley has done some excellent work in the past on projects like The Nice Guys, Greenland and Jason Bourne, so it seems odd that Naishuller doesn't seem to trust him to score swathes of the movie, and instead opts for a bunch of out-of-place jukebox tracks." Dwight Brown of San Diego Voice & Viewpoint wrote "David Buckley's (Jason Bourne) musical score coupled with a playlist of Louis Armstrong, Andy Williams and Nina Simone standards is a soothing and welcomed contrast to the mayhem." Quinn Hough and Tom Russell of Screen Rant wrote "The Nobody soundtrack is as much a secret weapon for the movie as Hutch's surprising fighting skills. It helps to elevate the film beyond being just a brutal thriller story and uses each song to enhance the action sequences and the characters."

== Additional music ==
The following songs are featured in the film, but not included in the soundtrack:

- "Don't Let Me Be Misunderstood" – Nina Simone
- "Heartbreaker" – Pat Benatar
- "Life Is a Bitch" – Luther Allison
- "Dvigai Popoy" – Mandarinki
- "I've Gotta Be Me" – Steve Lawrence
- "Buhgalter (The Auditor)" – Kombinatsiya
- "Serye Glaza (Gray Eyes)" – Natasha Korolyova
- "Piano Concerto No. 1 in B-flat minor" – Pyotr Ilyich Tchaikovsky
- "I Told Myself a Lie" – Clyde McPhatter
- "I Won't Give You Up" – Almost Here
- "Funky Music Sho' 'Nuff Turns Me On" – Edwin Starr
- "Straighten Up and Fly Right" – Dean Hudson
- "What a Wonderful World" – Louis Armstrong
- "The Impossible Dream" – Andy Williams
- "You'll Never Walk Alone" – Gerry and the Pacemakers
- "Let the Good Times Roll (Feel So Good)" – Bunny Sigler
