= B Sides and Rarities (Andy Williams album) =

Compilation album by Andy Williams
- Released: May 27, 2003
- Recorded: 1947, 1962–1973
- Genre: Traditional pop; vocal pop; standards; early pop/rock; AM pop; easy pop; soft rock
- Length: 78:45
- Label: Collectables Records

Andy Williams chronology
The Essential Andy Williams (2002)	B Sides and Rarities (2003)	Music to Watch Girls By: The Very Best of Andy Williams (2005)

B Sides and Rarities is a compilation album by the American pop singer Andy Williams that was released by Collectables Records on May 27, 2003. Although the collection starts with two 1947 recordings by Kay Thompson and The Williams Brothers, the rest of the material comes from his time at Columbia Records and includes covers of contemporary hits ("Cherish", "If You Could Read My Mind", "He Ain't Heavy, He's My Brother") as well as lesser-known material from the songwriters of "Can't Get Used to Losing You", "Home Lovin' Man" and "Moon River".

One of the rarities included here actually did reach the charts of Billboard magazine. Released as the B-side of the number 13 hit "Hopeless", Williams's recording of "The Peking Theme (So Little Time)" was included in the 1963 film 55 Days at Peking and reached number 115 during the three weeks that it "bubbled under" the Billboard Hot 100 in June of that year. It was nominated for an Academy Award for Best Original Song in early 1964, and Williams was asked and did appear to perform at the Oscar ceremony that April but not to sing that song. Instead he sang his number 100 hit from January, "Charade", as well as the song included in the title of his new album that was soon to be released, The Academy Award–Winning "Call Me Irresponsible" and Other Hit Songs from the Movies. Harve Presnell performed "The Peking Theme" that evening, but the winner was "Call Me Irresponsible".

== Track listing ==
1. "Louisiana Purchase" by Kay Thompson and The Williams Brothers (Irving Berlin) – 2:56
  - recorded on 12/19/47; first released on 10-inch 78 on 4/12/48
2. "Jubilee" by Kay Thompson and The Williams Brothers (Kay Thompson) – 3:17
  - rec. 12/19/47; first released on 10-inch 78 on 2/9/48
3. "Help Me" (Carole King, Cynthia Weil) – 2:21
  - rec. 1/12/62; B-side of "The Wonderful World of the Young" (1962)
4. "The Peking Theme (So Little Time)" (Dimitri Tiomkin, Paul Francis Webster) – 2:48
  - rec. 2/18/63; B-side of "Hopeless" (1963)
5. "Autumn" (Richard Maltby, Jr., David Shire) – 2:19
  - rec. 2/10/65; previously unreleased in the US
6. "Here's to My Lady" (Rube Bloom, Johnny Mercer) – 2:57
  - rec. 2/13/65; first released on the 1991 compilation The Great American Composers: Johnny Mercer
7. "I'll See You in My Dreams" (Isham Jones, Gus Kahn) – 2:39
  - rec. 5/11/65; first released on the 1969 compilation Andy and Company
8. "Loved One" (Carolyn Leigh, Jack Segal) – 2:49
  - rec. 6/30/65; B-side of "Ain't It True" (1965)
9. "The Many Faces of Love" (Jerome "Doc" Pomus, Mort Shuman) – 2:17
  - rec. 6/2266; B-side of "In the Arms of Love" (1966)
10. "Ave Maria" (Franz Schubert) – 4:55
  - rec. 7/17/68; B-side of "Battle Hymn of the Republic" (1968)
11. "The Sound of Music" (Oscar Hammerstein II, Richard Rodgers) – 2:25
  - rec. 10/3/68; first released on the 1969 2-LP compilation The Andy Williams Sound of Music
12. "What Am I Living For" (Art Harris, Fred Jay) – 3:06
  - rec. 9/17/69; B-side of "A Woman's Way" (1969)
13. "Cherish" (Terry Kirkman) – 3:40
  - rec. 4/6/70; recorded for (but not included on) the 1970 album The Andy Williams Show
14. "Whistling Away the Dark" (Henry Mancini, Johnny Mercer) – 3:19
  - rec. 7/28/70; B-side of "Home Lovin' Man" (1970)
15. "Free to Go" (Paul Anka, Bert Kaempfert) – 3:23
  - rec. 7/28/70; previously unreleased
16. "Someone Who Cares" (Alex Harvey) – 3:15
  - rec. 12/17/70; first released in 1971 in the UK on Love Story and in the US on the 2-LP compilation The Impossible Dream
17. "The Last Time I Saw Her" (Gordon Lightfoot) – 3:25
  - rec. 4/22/71; first released in 1971 in the UK on Love Story and in the US on the 2-LP compilation The Impossible Dream
18. "Long, Long Time" (Gary White) – 3:37
  - rec. 4/22/71–4/26/71; first released in 1971 in the UK on Love Story and in the US on the 2-LP compilation The Impossible Dream
19. "If You Could Read My Mind" (Gordon Lightfoot) – 3:52
  - rec. 4/22/71–4/26/71; only released on the 1971 UK album Love Story
20. "He Ain't Heavy, He's My Brother" (Bob Russell, Bobby Scott) – 2:59
  - rec. 4/22/71–4/26/71; first released in 1971 in the UK on Love Story and in the US on the 2-LP compilation The Impossible Dream
21. "Help Me Make It Through the Night" (Kris Kristofferson) – 2:36
  - rec. 6/10/71; first released on the quadraphonic version of the 1971 album You've Got a Friend
22. "Home For Thee" (Paul T. Parrish) – 3:04
  - rec. 2/19/72–2/24/72; B-side of "Speak Softly Love (Love Theme from 'The Godfather')" (1972)
23. "You Chose a Fine Time" (Roger Cook, Roger Greenaway, Tony Macaulay) – 2:46
  - rec. 4/14/72; only released as a UK single
24. "Who Was It?" (Gilbert O'Sullivan) - 2:50
  - rec. 9/16/72; B-side of "Marmalade, Molasses & Honey" (1972)
25. "I'll Never Be The Same" (June Millington) – 3:41
  - rec. 2/19/73; B-side of "Last Tango in Paris"

== Song information ==
As was typical of Williams's early albums at Columbia, this collection includes selections from stage and screen. "Louisiana Purchase" is the title song from Irving Berlin's 1940 Broadway musical. "Autumn" originated in the 1958 musical Cyrano, and "The Sound of Music" was first performed by Mary Martin as the title song of the 1959 Broadway musical. "Whistling Away the Dark" was first sung by Julie Andrews for the 1970 film Darling Lili and received an Academy Award nomination for Best Original Song. "Someone Who Cares" by Kenny Rogers and the First Edition was included in the 1970 film Fools and had its highest chart ranking as a number four hit on Billboard magazine's weekly list of the most popular Easy Listening songs.

Several of Williams's other selections covered here also had their best showings as Easy Listening hits. "The Last Time I Saw Her" by Glen Campbell reached number 12 on that chart, while "Long, Long Time" by Linda Ronstadt got as high as number 20. "Who Was It?" was a number 12 Easy Listening hit for Hurricane Smith, and Gordon Lightfoot's "If You Could Read My Mind" went all the way to number one. "Cherish" was initially a number one pop hit for The Association and later reached the top of the Easy Listening chart thanks to David Cassidy.

Williams covers number-one hits from a variety of other charts as well. Of the five recordings of "I'll See You in My Dreams" that made the pop charts in 1925, the most successful rendition came from Isham Jones & the Ray Miller Orchestra, who spent seven weeks with the song at number one. Chuck Willis took "What Am I Living For" to number one on the Billboard R&B chart. "Help Me Make It Through the Night" gave Sammi Smith a number one Country hit. And as of the time of Williams's recording of "He Ain't Heavy, He's My Brother", The Hollies had already peaked at number three with it in the UK, but they later reached number one there when the song was reissued.

Other selections from the more distant past are also included on this collection. One of the earliest recordings of "Here's to My Lady" was done by Perry Como in 1951. And Richard Erikson writes in the liner notes to the collection that Williams recorded the Latin Catholic Prayer version of Franz Schubert's "Ave Maria" "days after the funeral of Sen. Robert F. Kennedy as a memorial to the slain leader".

== Personnel ==
- Andy Williams – vocalist

=== Collectables Records reissue ===
From the liner notes:

Compiled by Richard Erikson

- Dan Rivard – producer
- Ken Robertson – producer; reissue engineer
- Richard Erikson – associate producer; liner notes

== Bibliography ==
- Whitburn, Joel (1986), Joel Whitburn's Pop Memories, 1890-1954, Record Research Inc., ISBN 0-89820-083-0
- Whitburn, Joel (2002), Joel Whitburn's Top Country Singles, 1944-2001, Record Research Inc., ISBN 0-89820-151-9
- Whitburn, Joel (2004), Joel Whitburn Presents Top R&B/Hip-Hop Singles, 1942-2004, Record Research Inc., ISBN 0-89820-160-8
- Whitburn, Joel (2007), Joel Whitburn Presents Billboard Top Adult Songs, 1961-2006, Record Research Inc., ISBN 978-0-89820-169-7
- Whitburn, Joel (2009), Joel Whitburn's Top Pop Singles, 1955-2008, Record Research Inc., ISBN 978-0-89820-180-2
- Wiley, Mason; Bona, Damien (1996), Inside Oscar: The Unofficial History of the Academy Awards, Ballantine Books, ISBN 0-345-40053-4
