= The Love Songs (Andy Williams album) =

Compilation album by Andy Williams
- Released: May 19, 1997
- Recorded: 1957–1974
- Genre: Traditional pop; vocal pop; standards; AM Pop; early pop/rock; soft rock; film music; soundtracks
- Label: Sony Music Entertainment

Andy Williams chronology
The Best of Andy Williams (1996)	The Love Songs (1997)	In the Lounge with... (1999)

The Love Songs is a compilation album by American pop singer Andy Williams that was released by Sony Music Entertainment on May 19, 1997.

On July 22, 2013, the British Phonographic Industry awarded the album with Gold certification for sales of 100,000 units.

== Track listing ==
1. "Can't Take My Eyes Off You" (Bob Crewe, Bob Gaudio) – 3:15
2. "Can't Get Used to Losing You" (Jerome "Doc" Pomus, Mort Shuman) – 2:25
3. "Somethin' Stupid" (C. Carson Parks) – 2:59
4. "Seasons in the Sun" (Jacques Brel, Rod McKuen) – 4:41
5. "Strangers in the Night" (Charlie Singleton, Eddie Snyder, Bert Kaempfert) – 2:32
6. "Fire and Rain" (James Taylor) – 3:36
7. "You've Got a Friend" (Carole King) – 4:44
8. "We've Only Just Begun" (Roger Nichols, Paul Williams) – 3:15
9. "(Where Do I Begin) Love Story" (Francis Lai, Carl Sigman) – 3:10
10. "The Way We Were" from The Way We Were (Alan Bergman, Marilyn Bergman, Marvin Hamlisch) – 3:18
11. "The Look of Love" from Casino Royale (Burt Bacharach, Hal David) – 2:55
12. "You Are the Sunshine of My Life" (Stevie Wonder) – 3:11
13. "Touch Me in the Morning" (Michael Masser, Ron Miller) – 3:55
14. "Without You" (Tom Evans, Peter Ham) – 3:16
15. "Solitaire" (Phil Cody, Neil Sedaka) – 4:22
16. "Unchained Melody" (Hy Zaret, Alex North) – 3:16
17. "Can't Help Falling in Love" (George Weiss, Hugo Peretti, Luigi Creatore) – 3:15
18. "The Hawaiian Wedding Song" (Al Hoffman, Charles E. King, Dick Manning) – 2:29
19. "I Won't Last a Day Without You" (Roger Nichols, Paul Williams) – 5:19
20. "Music to Watch Girls By" (Tony Velona, Sid Ramin) – 2:38
21. "Butterfly" (Bernie Lowe, Kal Mann) – 2:21
22. "Killing Me Softly with Her Song" (Charles Fox, Norman Gimbel) – 4:31
23. "May Each Day" from The Andy Williams Show (Mort Green, George Wyle) – 2:54
