= Gigi (song) =

1958 song by Louis Jourdan

"Gigi" is the title song from the 1958 Academy Award–winning film, directed by Vincente Minnelli. It was written by Frederick Loewe (music) and Alan Jay Lerner (words), sung by Louis Jourdan in the film. It then went on to win the Academy Award for Best Original Song in 1958.

== Recordings ==
- Andy Williams – included in his album The Academy Award–Winning "Call Me Irresponsible" and Other Hit Songs from the Movies (1964).
- Billy Eckstine – his version peaked at #8 in the UK Singles Chart in 1959.
- Bing Crosby – recorded on December 27, 1957 for Decca Records with Pete King and His Orchestra and Chorus.
- Dean Martin – included in his album French Style (1962).
- Harry James released a version on his album For Listening And Dancing (Reader's Digest RD4A 213) (1981)
- Liberace – a single release in 1959.
- Louis Jourdan – for the soundtrack album Gigi (1958).
- Mantovani – included in the album Mantovani Plays All-Time Romantic Hits (1975).
- Pete & Conte Candoli – an instrumental version was recorded on March 21, 1962, for the LP There Is Nothing Like a Dame with Pete Candoli and Conte Candoli on trumpets, Shelly Manne on drums, Jimmy Rowles on piano, Howard Roberts on guitar and Gary Peacock on bass.
- Robert Goulet – for his album Sincerely Yours (1962),
- Ronnie Hilton – a single release in 1959.
- Sergio Franchi recorded the song in England with Wally Stott on his 1964 RCA Victor Red Seal album Women in My Life.
- Steve Lawrence – included in the album Love Songs from the Movies (2005).
- Vic Damone – a 1958 single release.
