= It's a Most Unusual Day =

1948 popular song

"It's a Most Unusual Day" is a popular song composed by Jimmy McHugh, with lyrics by Harold Adamson. It is considered part of the Great American Songbook. It was introduced in the film A Date With Judy. In the opening scene, Jane Powell and a bit later Elizabeth Taylor (dubbed by Jean McLaren) sings it, both accompanied by a high school swing band. Powell then sings it again in the film's finale. The film version of the song has been reissued for albums containing Powell's film songs. She performed the song again on The Ed Sullivan Show on July 19, 1964.

Beverly Kenney recorded "It's a Most Unusual Day" in 1957 for her album Beverly Kenney Sings for Playboys. The song was used as the jingle for a Lincoln commercial in November 2021.

June Christy recorded "It's a Most Unusual Day" with the Stan Kenton Orchestra on 10 October 1959 for her 1960 album Road Show. It later became associated with Andy Williams, who recorded it for his album Days of Wine and Roses and Other TV Requests, in 1963, which sold two million copies by the end of 1967. Rosemary Clooney, Chris Connor for her 1958 album A Jazz Date with Chris Connor, Wesla Whitfield, and Diana Panton also recorded the tune.

In "The Chaperone" (6.1) episode of Seinfeld, one of Jerry's girlfriends sings the song in a Miss America beauty contest. It plays as source music during an opening scene of North by Northwest (1959) as the main character, Roger Thornhill, walks through the lobby of a hotel on his way to the Oak Room.
