= Love Story (compilation album) =

Compilation album by Andy Williams
- Released: July 1971
- Recorded: February 10, 1965; September 17, 1969; July 28, 1970; December 17, 1970; April 1971
- Genre: Traditional pop; vocal pop; soft rock
- Length: 31:36
- Label: CBS Records

Andy Williams chronology
Love Story (1971)	Love Story (1971)	You've Got a Friend (1971)

Love Story is a compilation album by American pop singer Andy Williams that was released in the UK in July 1971 by the CBS Records division of Columbia and was mainly composed of tracks that had not been included on his studio LPs.

The compilation entered the UK album chart on July 31, 1971, and reached number 11 over the course of 11 weeks.

The title track from the album, which was subtitled "Where Do I Begin?", entered the Hot 100 in the US in the issue of Billboard magazine dated February 6, 1971, and stayed on the chart for 13 weeks, eventually peaking at number nine. The song also entered the magazine's list of the 40 most popular Easy Listening songs of the week in that same issue for its first of 15 weeks, later spending four weeks at number one and tying his previous record there, which was set by "Can't Get Used to Losing You" in 1963. Its lifespan on the UK singles chart began on March 20 of that same year and lasted 18 weeks, during which time it reached number four.

== Track listing ==
=== Side one ===
1. "Someone Who Cares" from Fools (Alex Harvey) – 3:15
  - first released in the US in December 1971 on the 2-LP compilation The Impossible Dream
2. "Long, Long Time" (Gary White) – 3:37
  - first released in the US in December 1971 on the 2-LP compilation The Impossible Dream
3. "What Am I Living For" (Art Harris, Fred Jay) – 3:06
  - B-side of "A Woman's Way" (1969)
4. "Whistling Away the Dark" from Darling Lili (Henry Mancini, Johnny Mercer) – 3:19
  - B-side of "Home Lovin' Man" (1970)
5. "If You Could Read My Mind" (Gordon Lightfoot) – 3:52
  - first released in the US on the CD compilation B Sides and Rarities (2003)

=== Side two ===
1. "I'll Be There" (Hal Davis, Berry Gordy, Willie Hutch, Bob West) – 2:39
  - first released in the US in August 1971 on the album You've Got a Friend
2. "He Ain't Heavy, He's My Brother" (Bob Russell, Bobby Scott) – 2:59
  - first released in the US in December 1971 on the 2-LP compilation The Impossible Dream
3. "Autumn" from Cyrano (Richard Maltby, Jr., David Shire) – 2:19
  - first released in the US on the CD compilation B Sides and Rarities (2003)
4. "The Last Time I Saw Her" (Gordon Lightfoot) – 3:25
  - first released in the US in December 1971 on the 2-LP compilation The Impossible Dream
5. "(Where Do I Begin) Love Story" (Francis Lai, Carl Sigman) – 3:10

== Recording dates ==
- February 10, 1965 – "Autumn"
- September 17, 1969 – "What Am I Living For"
- July 28, 1970 – "Whistling Away the Dark"
- December 17, 1970 – "Someone Who Cares", "(Where Do I Begin) Love Story"
- April 22, 1971 – "I'll Be There", "The Last Time I Saw Her"
- April 22, 1971 – April 26, 1971 – "Long, Long Time", "If You Could Read My Mind", "He Ain't Heavy, He's My Brother"

== Bibliography ==
- Whitburn, Joel (1993), Joel Whitburn's Top Adult Contemporary, 1961-1993, Record Research Inc., ISBN 0-89820-099-7
- Whitburn, Joel (2002), Joel Whitburn's Top Country Singles, 1944-2001, Record Research Inc., ISBN 0-89820-151-9
- Whitburn, Joel (2004), Joel Whitburn Presents Top R&B/Hip-Hop Singles, 1942-2004, Record Research Inc., ISBN 0-89820-160-8
- Whitburn, Joel (2009), Joel Whitburn's Top Pop Singles, 1955-2008, Record Research Inc., ISBN 978-0-89820-180-2
