= A Song for You =

1970 single by Leon Russell

- 1972 Japanese re-release

Single by Leon Russell

from the album Leon Russell
- Released: May 1970
- Genre: Blue-eyed soul
- Length: 4:08
- Label: Shelter (US); A&M (UK)
- Songwriter: Leon Russell
- Producer: Leon Russell

Leon Russell singles chronology
"A Song for You" (1970)	"Roll Away the Stone" (1970)

"A Song for You" is a song written and originally recorded by American rock singer and pianist Leon Russell for his self-titled debut solo album, which was released in 1970 on Shelter Records. A slow, pained plea for forgiveness and understanding from an estranged lover, the tune is one of Russell's best-known compositions. Russell sang, played piano, and played tenor horn on the recording. It has been performed and recorded by over 200 artists, spanning many musical genres. The Encyclopedia of Country Music wrote in 2012: "In 1970 Russell released his self-titled debut solo album, including such enduring songs as "Delta Lady" and "A Song for You", both written for versatile vocalist Rita Coolidge.

One of the first versions of the song was by Andy Williams, who performed it on his 1971 album You've Got a Friend. "A Song For You" later received broader attention from a live performance by Donny Hathaway recorded on his 1972 album, Donny Hathaway Live. Hathaway's iconic rendition of the song became a massive hit and a standard, often mistakenly credited as his own composition due to its profound emotional impact and gospel-infused arrangement, redefining the song for many listeners, even influencing The Carpenters' version on their album of the same name. Ray Charles recorded a version that earned him the 1994 Grammy Award for Best Male R&B Vocal Performance.

On January 17, 2018, "A Song for You" was added to the Grammy Hall of Fame. In June 2026, CBS News included the song in its list of the 250 essential American songs of the past 250 years.

Kodi Lee sang "A Song for You" for his first audition on America's Got Talent Season 14, which aired on May 28, 2019. He was awarded the Golden Buzzer for his performance by guest judge Gabrielle Union and went on to become the Season 14 winner.

== Notable cover versions ==
"A Song for You"

Single by Andy Williams

from the album You've Got a Friend
- B-side: "You've Got a Friend"
- Released: August 1971
- Genre: Blue-eyed soul
- Length: 3:12
- Label: Columbia 45434
- Songwriter: Leon Russell
- Producer: Dick Glasser

Andy Williams singles chronology
"(Where Do I Begin) Love Story" (1971)	"A Song for You" (1971)	"Love Is All" (1971)

1"A Song for You" has been covered many times since its release. The most notable versions include the following:

- 1971 – Dusty Springfield recorded the song for her 1972 album, See All Her Faces. It was an outtake and unreleased until Dusty in London was issued by Rhino Records in February 1999.
- 1971 – Andy Williams recorded the song for his covers album, You've Got a Friend. His version rose to number 29 on the Easy Listening chart (today's Adult Contemporary) in September 1971. At the same time it hit number 82 on the main pop singles chart.
- 1971 – Donny Hathaway recorded the song for his second album Donny Hathaway, featuring orchestral string and woodwind parts arranged by Arif Mardin. Hathaway's producer Jerry Wexler wrote that this version revealed why Mardin was known for the "fastest growing reputation among the new breed of arrangers..." Hathaway's gospel-inflected interpretation has been praised as redefining the song as his own. His live performances were electrifying, evoking a near-religious experience for the audience.
- 1972 – The Carpenters used the song for the name of their hit album A Song for You, and included it as the first track and the last track (in the form of a reprise). The Carpenters took Leon Russell's lyrical idea and expanded it to frame their whole album as a concept album. Though the song itself was not released as a single by the Carpenters, they performed it on a Bob Hope television special that aired on October 5, 1972. Their version is considered a standard of adult contemporary music.
- 1972 – Peggy Lee recorded the song on her 1972 album Norma Deloris Egstrom from Jamestown, North Dakota.
- 1972 – Cher recorded the song on her 1972 album Foxy Lady.
- 1973 – Willie Nelson sang a solo acoustic guitar version for his album Shotgun Willie, using his famous guitar Trigger. With this stripped-down arrangement, Nelson brings the greatest degree of intimacy to the song. Nelson also performed the song in the 1980 movie Honeysuckle Rose, and it appears on the movie's soundtrack.
- 1974 – Aretha Franklin recorded a version of the song for her album Let Me in Your Life.
- 1975 – The Temptations covered the song on their album A Song for You
- 1975 – Mina covered the song on her album La Mina
- 1976 – Joe Cocker covered the song on his 1976 album Stingray.
- 1979 – Sylvester performed the song together with Eric Robinson at his legendary San Francisco concert at San Francisco Opera House, segueing it from "Could It Be Magic." The recorded version was released on the 1979 live album "Living Proof".
- 1993 – Ray Charles recorded a version of the song on his 1993 album My World. Released as a single, it reached number 104 on the Bubbling Under Hot 100 Singles, and won him a Grammy Award for Best Male R&B Vocal Performance.
- 2003 – Willie Nelson, Leon Russell and Ray Charles performed the song at New York's Beacon Theatre on April 9, 2003, as part of Willie Nelson's 70th birthday tribute (released on CD and DVD as Live and Kickin' credited to "Willie Nelson & Friends"). Leon Russell sang the first verse, Willie Nelson sang the second verse, and Charles sang the remainder of the song in this performance. Nelson, who stood nearby during Charles' performance, was visibly moved.
- 2005 – Herbie Hancock featuring Christina Aguilera. This version charted at number 11 on Billboard's Smooth Jazz Airplay chart in May 2006. It was also nominated for Best Pop Collaboration with Vocals at the 2006 Grammy Awards. Hancock and Aguilera performed a live rendition at the ceremony.
- 2008 – Bizzy Bone featuring DMX & Chris Notez, rose to number 61 on the US Billboard Hot R&B/Hip-Hop Songs chart.
- 2009 – Whitney Houston recorded an uptempo version of the song for her final studio album I Look to You. Houston also performed a slowed-down version of the song in 1991 at her Welcome Home Heroes with Whitney Houston concert. It was reported that Russell was so moved by the performance that he personally wrote her a letter expressing his admiration of her rendition of his song.
- 2011 – Amy Winehouse recorded a version from her home that was included on the posthumous Lioness: Hidden Treasures compilation album. She specifically covered the Donny Hathaway version and references him at the end of the recording.
- 2023 - Suzanne Somers sang a version of the song in a video clip at her own memorial. She was 76. According to her husband Alan Hamel, he claims that it was "our song" as "there wasn't a dry eye in the room".
