= Days of Wine and Roses and Other TV Requests =

Studio album by Andy Williams
- Released: April 1963
- Recorded: 1963
- Genre: Traditional pop; vocal pop
- Length: 35:53
- Label: Columbia
- Producer: Robert Mersey

Andy Williams chronology
Million Seller Songs (1962)	Days of Wine and Roses and Other TV Requests (1963)	The Andy Williams Christmas Album (1963)

Singles from Days of Wine and Roses and Other TV Requests
- 1. "Days of Wine and Roses" Released: March 1963

Days of Wine and Roses and Other TV Requests is the eleventh studio album by American pop singer Andy Williams and was released in April 1963 by Columbia Records following his first season as host of his variety series, The Andy Williams Show. The LP has a studio recording of the closing theme from the show, "May Each Day", and continues the format of his previous Columbia releases by including songs from the 1920s ("When You're Smiling (The Whole World Smiles with You)"), 1930s ("Exactly Like You", "Falling in Love with Love"), 1940s ("It's a Most Unusual Day", "You Are My Sunshine"), and 1950s ("I Really Don't Want to Know").

The album debuted on the Billboard Top LP's chart in the issue dated April 20, 1963, and remained on the album chart for 107 weeks, spending 16 consecutive weeks at number one. it also debuted on the Cashbox albums chart in the issue dated April 13, 1963, and remained on the chart for 118 weeks, spending 16 consecutive weeks at number one The album received Gold certification from the Recording Industry Association of America on September 19, 1963, becoming his first to do so, while his 1962 album Moon River and Other Great Movie Themes followed suit one month later. For its release in the UK, the album was retitled Can't Get Used to Losing You and Other Requests, and it spent its only week on the album chart there at number 16 in 1965.

The single from the album, "Can't Get Used to Losing You," made its debut on the Billboard Hot 100 chart on March 7, 1963, eventually spending four weeks at number two during its 15-week stay. On the Easy Listening chart it spent 1 week at number one. on the Cashbox singles weeks it spent four weeks at number one during its 17-week stay. Its B-side, "Days of Wine and Roses" reached number 26 on the Hot 100, number 29 on the Cashbox, and number nine, Easy Listening

The album was released on compact disc (and under its UK title) by Sony Music Distribution in the mid-1990s as tracks 1 through 12 on a pairing of two albums on one CD with tracks 13 through 24 along with Williams's 1967 Columbia album, Love, Andy. It was also released (under its original title) as one of two albums on one CD by Collectables Records on January 16, 2001, along with Williams's 1966 Columbia album, In the Arms of Love. Days of Wine and Roses and Other TV Requests was included in a box set entitled Classic Album Collection, Vol. 1, which contains 17 of his studio albums and three compilations and was released on June 26, 2001.

== Critical reception ==
Professional ratings
Review scores
Source	Rating
AllMusic	3/5 stars
The Encyclopedia of Popular Music	4/5 stars
New Record Mirror	5/5 stars
Disc	4/5 stars

Cashbox referred to it as "a sure-fire blockbuster". Billboard proclaimed this was a "another Hot LP for [Williams]" as "it contains of his most requested TV tunes, including 'My Coloring Book', 'What Kind of Fool Am I', and 'You Are My Sunshine', in addition to the title tune," Music Vendor praised Williams for his "cool readings throughout" the album." New Record Mirror described the album as "an excellent performance" with every track "equally entertaining". Nigel Hunter of Disc wrote that Williams "does a beauiftul job on 'San Francisco', running close to the standard of Tony Bennett's classic version."

William Ruhlmann of AllMusic said that the album "breaks down into essentially straight versions of currently popular ballads...and revivals of interwar chestnuts that have been given excessively razzle-dazzle arrangements... Maybe those orchestrations worked well with dancers as TV production numbers, but on record they sound overdone."

== Track listing ==
=== Side one ===
1. "Falling in Love with Love" from The Boys from Syracuse (Lorenz Hart, Richard Rodgers) – 2:13
2. "I Left My Heart in San Francisco" (George Cory, Douglass Cross) – 3:06
3. "You Are My Sunshine" (Jimmie Davis, Charles Mitchell) – 2:29
4. "What Kind of Fool Am I?" from Stop the World – I Want to Get Off (Leslie Bricusse, Anthony Newley) – 3:22
5. "When You're Smiling (The Whole World Smiles with You)" (Mark Fisher, Joe Goodwin, Larry Shay) – 1:44
6. "Days of Wine and Roses" from Days of Wine and Roses (Henry Mancini, Johnny Mercer) – 2:48

=== Side two ===
1. "It's a Most Unusual Day" from A Date with Judy (Harold Adamson, Jimmy McHugh) – 2:04
2. "My Coloring Book" (Fred Ebb, John Kander) – 3:34
3. "Can't Get Used to Losing You" (Jerome "Doc" Pomus, Mort Shuman) – 2:25
4. "I Really Don't Want to Know" (Howard Barnes, Don Robertson) – 2:54
5. "Exactly Like You" from the 1930 Broadway show Lew Leslie's International Revue (Dorothy Fields, Jimmy McHugh) – 1:59
6. "May Each Day" from The Andy Williams Show (Mort Green, George Wyle) – 2:54

== Charts ==
Chart (1963)	Peak position
US Top LPs (Billboard)	1
US Cashbox	1
UK Albums Chart	16

=== Singles ===
Year	Title	U.S. Hot 100	U.S. Cashbox	U.S. AC	UK singles
1963	"Days of Wine and Roses"	26	29	9	-
1963	"Can't Get Used to Losing You"	2	1	1	2

== Grammy nominations ==
This album brought the third and fourth Grammy nominations that Williams received over the course of his career, with one in the category for Best Solo Vocal Performance, Male for the song "Days of Wine and Roses." The other nomination was for the album itself in the category of Album of the Year.

== Bibliography ==
- O'Neil, Thomas (1999), The Grammys, Perigree Books, ISBN 0-399-52477-0
- Whitburn, Joel (1985), Joel Whitburn's Top Pop Albums, 1955-1985, Record Research Inc., ISBN 0-89820-054-7
- Whitburn, Joel (1993), Joel Whitburn's Top Adult Contemporary, 1961-1993, Record Research Inc., ISBN 0-89820-099-7
- Whitburn, Joel (1999), Joel Whitburn's Top Pop Singles, 1955-1999, Record Research Inc., ISBN 0-89820-140-3
- Hoffmann, Frank W (1988), The Cash box album charts, 1955-1974, Scarecrow Press, ISBN 0-810-82005-6
- Larkin, Colin (2007), The Encyclopedia of Popular Music, Omnibus Press, ISBN 9-7818-4609-8567
- Downey, Pat (1994), Cash box pop singles charts, 1950-1993, Libraries Unlimited, ISBN 1-56308-316-7
