= The Great Songs from "My Fair Lady" and Other Broadway Hits =

Studio album by Andy Williams
- Released: 1964
- Recorded: 1964
- Genres: Traditional pop; vocal pop; early pop/rock
- Length: 33:37
- Label: Columbia
- Producer: Robert Mersey

Andy Williams chronology
The Academy Award–Winning "Call Me Irresponsible" and Other Hit Songs from the Movies (1964)	The Great Songs from "My Fair Lady" and Other Broadway Hits (1964)	Andy Williams' Dear Heart (1965)

Singles from The Great Songs from "My Fair Lady" and Other Broadway Hits
- 1. "On the Street Where You Live" Released: August 25, 1964

The Great Songs from "My Fair Lady" and Other Broadway Hits is the fifteenth studio album by American pop singer Andy Williams and was released in September 1964 by Columbia Records, one month before the premiere of the film version of My Fair Lady starring Audrey Hepburn.

The album debuted on Billboard magazine's Top LP's chart in the issue dated September 26, 1964, and remained on the chart for 33 weeks, peaking at number five. it also debuted on the Cashbox albums chart in the issue dated September 19, 1964, and remained on the chart for total of 34 weeks, also peaking at number three. The album received Gold certification from the Recording Industry Association of America on September 17, 1965.

The single from the album, "On the Street Where You Live", debuted on the Billboard Hot 100 in the issue dated September 12, 1964, eventually reaching number 28 during its eight-week stay. The song peaked at number 3 on the magazine's Easy Listening chart, during its eight weeks there. and number 40 on the Cashbox singles chart during its seven weeks there.

The album was released on compact disc as one of two albums on one CD by Collectables Records on March 23, 1999, along with Williams's 1964 Columbia album, The Academy Award–Winning "Call Me Irresponsible" and Other Hit Songs from the Movies. This same pairing was also released as two albums on one CD by Sony Music Distribution in 2000. The Great Songs from "My Fair Lady" and Other Broadway Hits was included in a box set entitled Classic Album Collection, Vol. 1, which contains 17 of his studio albums and three compilations and was released on June 26, 2001.

== Reception ==
Professional ratings
Review scores
Source	Rating
AllMusic	3/5 stars
The Encyclopedia of Popular Music	4/5 stars

William Ruhlmann of AllMusic noted that "Williams may have been going for a more swinging, up-tempo mood, but the busy charts, full of pizzicato strings, vocal choruses, and competing counter-melodies, distracted attention from the songs. an essentially comic song like "Get Me to the Church on Time," and a few of the arrangements did work, notably the bossa nova treatment of "Begin the Beguine" and the big band style of "The Sweetest Sounds.", it was these well-written Broadway tunes."

Billboard magazine wrote, "A sure-fire winner results from the combination of Andy Williams and selections from My Fair Lady during the season when the Warner Bros. film treatment of the Broadway hit musical will go into national release. This is further buttressed with a half dozen top tunes from other Broadway shows."

Cashbox notes "[Williams] devotes one side of the set to the music from "My Fair Lady" and the other to six melodic gems from current, recent and years-back Broadway shows"

Variety believed "[Williams] slick vocal works out on "On the Street Where You Live', 'I've Grown Accustomed to Her Face', ' I Could Have Danced All Night', 'Get Me To The Church On Time', 'Wouldn't It Be Lovely' and 'Show Me'

American Record Guide described the album as "a relaxed album of very good songs, with singing to match." the album received four-star rating from The Encyclopedia of Popular Music.

== Track listing ==
=== Side one ===
Songs from My Fair Lady:

1. "On the Street Where You Live" (Alan Jay Lerner, Frederick Loewe) – 3:12
2. "I've Grown Accustomed to Her Face" (Lerner, Loewe) – 3:07
3. "I Could Have Danced All Night" (Lerner, Loewe) – 2:18
4. "Get Me to the Church on Time" (Lerner, Loewe) – 1:58
5. "Wouldn't It Be Loverly" (Lerner, Loewe) – 2:30
6. "Show Me" (Lerner, Loewe) – 2:02

=== Side two ===
1. "Hello, Dolly!" from Hello, Dolly! (Jerry Herman) – 2:58
2. "Where or When" from Babes in Arms (Richard Rodgers, Lorenz Hart) – 2:35
3. "Begin the Beguine" from Jubilee (Cole Porter) – 3:15
4. "Once Upon a Time" from All American (Lee Adams, Charles Strouse) – 3:30
5. "People" from Funny Girl (Bob Merrill, Jule Styne) – 3:32
6. "The Sweetest Sounds" from No Strings (Richard Rodgers) – 2:44

== Charts ==
Chart (1964)	Peak position
US Top LPs (Billboard)	5
US Cashbox	3
UK Albums Chart	30

=== Singles ===
Year	Title	U.S. Hot 100	U.S. AC	U.S. Cashbox
1964	"On the Street Where You Live"	28	3	40

== Personnel ==
From the liner notes for the original album:

- Andy Williams – vocals
- Robert Mersey – conductor, producer
- Bob Cato – cover photo

== Bibliography ==
- O'Neil, Thomas (1999), The Grammys, Perigree Books, ISBN 0-399-52477-0
- Whitburn, Joel (1999), Joel Whitburn's Top Pop Singles, 1955-1999, Record Research Inc., ISBN 0-89820-140-3
- Whitburn, Joel (1985), Joel Whitburn's Top Pop Albums, 1955-1985, Record Research Inc., ISBN 0-89820-054-7
- Whitburn, Joel (1993), Joel Whitburn's Top Adult Contemporary, 1961-1993, Record Research Inc., ISBN 0-89820-099-7
- Whitburn, Joel (1986), Joel Whitburn's Pop Memories, 1890-1954, Record Research Inc., ISBN 0-89820-083-0
- Hoffmann, Frank W (1988), The Cash box album charts, 1955-1974, Scarecrow Press, ISBN 0-810-82005-6
- Larkin, Colin (2007), The Encyclopedia of Popular Music, Omnibus Press, ISBN 9-7818-4609-8567
- Downey, Pat (1994), Cash box pop singles charts, 1950-1993, Libraries Unlimited, ISBN 1-56308-316-7
