= Keep the Love-Light Burning in the Window Till the Boys Come Marching Home =

- Sheet music cover, first edition

Song
- Language: English
- Published: 1917
- Songwriter(s): Jack Caddigan and Jimmy McHugh

Keep the Love-Light Burning in the Window Till the Boys Come Marching Home is a World War I song with music and lyrics by Jack Caddigan and Jimmy McHugh. It was first published in May, 1917, a month after the United States entered World War I, by D. W. Cooper Publishing Co., in Boston, MA. By October, Chappell & Co. had brought suit, alleging that the title and refrain violated copyright on the British song, "Keep the Home-Fires Burning". Cooper settled out of court by agreeing to release a second edition, copyrighted October 23, 1917, with revised lyrics and the title "Keep the Love-Light Shining in the Window". In the meantime, Jos. W. Stern & Co. had acquired sole selling rights, and its imprint, along with Cooper's, appeared on the new version. A final edition, issued after Stern & Co. actually acquired the copyright, appeared in 1918.

The publishing history, as well as the number of surviving copies (at, for instance, the Pritzker Military Museum & Library), suggests that the song achieved national success, although it was never recorded and no piano rolls were made. It was popular with amateurs, and Jos. W. Stern & Co. promoted it vigorously, if briefly. By summer 1918, however, it had receded from view, to be supplanted two years later by a nearly identical title, "Keep the Lovelight Burning", by Billy Baskette.
