= Dear Heart (song) =

Single by Andy Williams

from the album Andy Williams' Dear Heart
- B-side: "Emily"
- Released: November 1964
- Genre: Vocal
- Length: 2:51
- Label: Columbia 43180
- Songwriters: Henry Mancini, Ray Evans, Jay Livingston
- Producer: Robert Mersey

Andy Williams singles chronology
"Almost There" (1964)	"Dear Heart" (1964)	"...and Roses and Roses" (1965)

"Dear Heart" is a song written by Henry Mancini, Ray Evans, and Jay Livingston and performed by Andy Williams. It appears on the 1965 Andy Williams album, Andy Williams' Dear Heart. The song was the theme to the 1964 movie Dear Heart. It was nominated for the Academy Award for Best Original Song and also nominated for best song at the 22nd Golden Globe Awards.

== Chart performance ==
Williams' cover of song reached #2 on the U.S. adult contemporary chart and #24 on the Billboard chart in 1964.

== Chart covers ==
- Jack Jones also released a version in late 1964. It debuted on the Billboard Hot 100 in the issue dated November 28, 1964, peaking at number 30 during a 11-week run, and debuted on the magazine's Easy Listening chart November 28, peaking at number six during a 11-week run. The track debuted on the Cashbox singles chart in the issue dated November 28, 1964, peaking at number 15 during an 12-week run. The single also charted in the Canada, it reached No. 9 on the RPM Adult Contemporary chart.
- Henry Mancini released a version of the song in 1964 that reached No. 14 on the adult contemporary chart and No. 77 on the Billboard Hot 100.

== Other Recordings ==
- Frank Sinatra recorded the song for his 1964 album Softly, as I Leave You.
- Al Martino – for his album We Could (1965).
- Bobby Darin – included in his album Venice Blue (1965)
- Brenda Lee – in her album The Versatile Brenda Lee (1965).
- Bobby Vinton – on his LP Drive-In Movie Time (1965).
- Mrs. Miller covered the song for her first Capitol Records album Mrs. Miller's Greatest Hits (1966).
- Slim Whitman – included in his album Home on the Range (1977)
- In the UK, there were cover versions in 1965 issued by Ronnie Hilton and Ronnie Carroll.
