= You've Got a Friend (Andy Williams album) =

Studio album by Andy Williams
- Released: 1971
- Recorded: April 22, 1971; June 10, 1971; July 7, 1971
- Genres: Traditional pop; vocal pop
- Length: 35:35
- Label: Columbia
- Producer: Dick Glasser

Andy Williams chronology
Love Story (UK version) (1971)	You've Got a Friend (1971)	The Impossible Dream (1972)

Singles from You've Got a Friend
- 1. "A Song for You" Released: August 1971

Alternate cover
- A Song for You (UK)

You've Got a Friend is the twenty-eighth studio album by American pop singer Andy Williams, released in August 1971 by Columbia Records. The album bears a striking resemblance to the Johnny Mathis album You've Got a Friend released that same month. Besides sharing their name, the two albums are both made up of covers of easy listening hits of the time, with 11 songs each, and the two albums have seven songs in common that are positioned in a similar order.

The album debuted on Billboard magazine's Top LP's & Tapes chart in the issue dated August 28, 1971, and remained there for 12 weeks, peaking at number 54. it also debuted on the Cashbox albums chart in the issue dated August 21, 1971, and remained on the chart for 12 weeks, peaking at number 45. For its release in the UK, the album was entitled A Song for You.

The single from the album, "A Song for You", entered the Hot 100 in the US in the issue of Billboard dated August 21, 1971, and stayed on the chart for four weeks, eventually peaking at number 82. The song entered the magazine's list of the 40 most popular Easy Listening songs of the week in the following issue, on August 28, for its first of five weeks, during which time it reached number 29. and number 95 on the Cashbox singles chart during its three weeks there.

You've Got a Friend was released on compact disc as one of two albums on one CD by Collectables Records on February 5, 2002, along with Williams's 1970 Columbia album, The Andy Williams Show. Collectables included this CD in a box set entitled Classic Album Collection, Vol. 2, which contains 15 of his studio albums and two compilations and was released on November 29, 2002.

== Reception ==
Professional ratings
Review scores
Source	Rating
Allmusic	3/5 stars
Billboard	Spotlight Pick
The Encyclopedia of Popular Music	3/5 stars

William Ruhlmann of AllMusic notes "The arrangements closely followed those of the original recordings; the difference was that the voice on the track was Williams', not Michael Jackson's or Karen Carpenter's. But such soft rockers of the early '70s were more palatable to middle-of-the-road audiences than some of the ones from the '60s".

Billboard magazine wrote, "In what may be one of his finest and most commercial packages of all time, Williams has a chart winner in this delightful program. Along with his new single, 'A Song for You', he turns in exceptional treatments of Carole King's 'You've Got a Friend', Kris Kristofferson's 'Help Me Make It Through the Night', and Nichols-Williams's 'Rainy Days and Mondays'."

Cashbox enjoyed "his respects to Carole King via versions of 'It's Too Late' and 'You've Got A Friend,' and a Motown mood for 'Never Can Say Goodbye' and 'I'll Be There'.

Both The Encyclopedia of Popular Music and AllMusic gave the album a three-star ratings.

== Track listing ==
=== Side one ===
1. "You've Got a Friend" (Carole King) – 4:44
2. "Help Me Make It Through the Night" (Kris Kristofferson) – 2:36
3. "How Can You Mend a Broken Heart?" (Barry Gibb, Robin Gibb) – 3:41
4. "Rainy Days and Mondays" (Roger Nichols, Paul Williams) – 2:58
5. "Never Can Say Goodbye" (Clifton Davis) – 3:33

=== Side two ===
1. "It's Too Late" (Carole King, Toni Stern) – 3:56
2. "I'll Be There" (Hal Davis, Berry Gordy, Willie Hutch, Bob West) – 2:39
3. "Here Comes That Rainy Day Feeling Again" (Roger Cook, Roger Greenaway, Tony Macaulay) – 2:33
4. "If" (David Gates) – 2:44
5. "For All We Know" from Lovers and Other Strangers (Jimmy Griffin, Fred Karlin, Robb Royer) – 3:12
6. "A Song for You" (Leon Russell) – 3:07

== Charts ==
Chart (1971)	Peak position
US Top LPs (Billboard)	54
US Cashbox	45

=== Singles ===
Year	Title	U.S. Hot 100	U.S. AC	U.S. Cashbox
1971	"A Song for You"	82	29	95

== Recording dates ==
From the liner notes for the 2002 CD:

- April 22, 1971 - "Help Me Make It Through the Night", "Rainy Days and Mondays", "Never Can Say Goodbye", "I'll Be There", "For All We Know"
- June 10, 1971 - "You've Got a Friend", "It's Too Late", "If"
- July 7, 1971 - "How Can You Mend a Broken Heart", "Here Comes That Rainy Day Feeling Again", "A Song for You"

== Personnel ==
From the liner notes for the original album:

- Andy Williams - vocals
- Dick Glasser - producer
- Al Capps - arranger ("You've Got a Friend", "Rainy Days and Mondays", "It's Too Late", "If", "For All We Know")
- Ernie Freeman - arranger ("Help Me Make It Through the Night", "How Can You Mend a Broken Heart?", "Never Can Say Goodbye", "Here Comes That Rainy Day Feeling Again", "A Song for You")
- Dick Hazard - arranger ("I'll Be There")
- Eric Prestidge - engineer, remix engineer
- Peter Romano - engineer
- Rafael O. Valentin - engineer
- Norman Seeff - cover photos
- Virginia Team - design

== Bibliography ==
- O'Neil, Thomas (1999), The Grammys, Perigree Books, ISBN 0-399-52477-0
- Whitburn, Joel (1993), Joel Whitburn's Top Adult Contemporary, 1961-1993, Record Research Inc., ISBN 0-89820-099-7
- Whitburn, Joel (2002), Joel Whitburn's Top Country Singles, 1944-2001, Record Research Inc., ISBN 0-89820-151-9
- Whitburn, Joel (2004), Joel Whitburn Presents Top R&B/Hip-Hop Singles, 1942-2004, Record Research Inc., ISBN 0-89820-160-8
- Whitburn, Joel (2009), Joel Whitburn's Top Pop Singles, 1955-2008, Record Research Inc., ISBN 978-0-89820-180-2
- Whitburn, Joel (2010), Joel Whitburn Presents Top Pop Albums, Seventh Edition, Record Research Inc., ISBN 978-0-89820-183-3
- Wiley, Mason; Bona, Damien (1996), Inside Oscar: The Unofficial History of the Academy Awards, Ballantine Books, ISBN 0-345-40053-4
- Hoffmann, Frank W (1988), The Cash box album charts, 1955-1974, Scarecrow Press, ISBN 0-810-82005-6
- Larkin, Colin (2007), The Encyclopedia of Popular Music, Omnibus Press, ISBN 9-7818-4609-8567
- Downey, Pat (1994), Cash box pop singles charts, 1950-1993, Libraries Unlimited, ISBN 1-56308-316-7
