= Beverly Kenney =

American jazz singer (1932–1960)

- Born: Beverly Kenney; January 29, 1932; Harrison, New Jersey, U.S
- Died: April 12, 1960 (aged 28) New York City, New York, U.S
- Genres: Jazz
- Occupation: Singer
- Years active: 1954–1960
- Labels: Royal Roost, Decca, Sinatra Society of Japan

Beverly Kenney (January 29, 1932, Harrison, New Jersey, New Jersey – April 12, 1960, Greenwich Village, New York City) was an American jazz singer.

== Early life ==
Kenney was born in Harrison, New Jersey on January 29, 1932, the first of Charles Joseph and Regina Kathleen "Jean" (née Abrams) Kenney's seven children together, and Jean's 9 in total. Her father was of Irish descent, her mother was of half Irish and half German Jewish descent.

== Career ==
Kenney began her career as a singer of singing telegrams for Western Union. In 1954, Kenney moved to Miami and worked regularly at the Black Magic Room, the Brook Lounge and La Vie En Rose in Miami Beach.

=== Dorsey Brothers Orchestra ===
In March 1955, Tommy Dorsey fired vocalist Lynn Roberts from the Dorsey Brothers Orchestra for "refus[ing] to cut her long blond hair." Kenney was hired in Roberts' place and began a tour with the through the southern United States. Kenney said "Tommy and Jimmy liked me, but they thought I was too much of a stylist for the band. After a few months on the road, I left, and returned to New York," where she sang in clubs with George Shearing, Don Elliott, and Kai Winding. After moving back to New Jersey, she recorded a demo tape in 1955 with Tony Tamburello (the demo was released in its entirety in 2006 under the title Snuggled on Your Shoulder).

Her big break came in October 1955, when she was featured in a Jazz Benefit concert for Israel at Carnegie Hall, sharing the bill with Miles Davis, Art Blakey, Tito Puente, and Marian McPartland. An October 25, 1956 newspaper ad lists Kenney as appearing at the Playgoer Room at the Westnor restaurant in Westport, Connecticut. At 24 years old, Kenney was beginning to become a fixture of the New York jazz scene. She earned a standing gig at Birdland with Lester Young, and upon her debut at New York's Basin Street Club, DownBeat critic Nat Hentoff praised her as compared to other artists. He said Kenney was “more flexible than Helen Merrill, swings more easily than Teddi King, and her musicianship and care for lyrics are far superior to Chris Connor’s".

=== Recordings ===
Between 1956 and 1960, Kenney recorded three albums for Royal Roost and three for Decca. Her first release, Beverly Kenney Sings for Johnny Smith (1956), was recorded when she was 24 and backed by a quartet led by jazz guitarist Johnny Smith. She then began a residency at Birdland accompanied by the Lester Young Quintet. Her television exposure consisted of one appearance on The Steve Allen Show on May 18, 1958, performing a song she wrote, "I Hate Rock 'n' Roll" and one appearance on Playboy's Penthouse, where Kenney coaxed host Hugh Hefner into joining her to sing "Makin' Whoopee".

Steve Allen wrote liner notes for her album Beverly Kenney Sings for Playboys (Decca, 1958) in which he commented, "A word to playboys: I would not recommend this album as Music to Make the Romantic Approach By. You're apt to get more interested in Beverly than the girl you're trying to impress".

In a review of her 1959 album Born to be Blue, editor Allan Gilbert Jr. said of Kenney "...she has the ability to gently, huskily slur, warp and mould her phrasing to achieve rare individuality" and that she "could be tomorrow's big name".

== Death and legacy ==
Kenney attempted suicide twice and succeeded the third time ingesting a combination of alcohol and Seconal on April 12, 1960, in a one-room apartment in the University Residence Hotel located at 45 East 11th Street in Greenwich Village, Manhattan, New York. Her father, Charles J. Kenney, had dinner with her two nights earlier and said "everything seemed fine".

She remains a cult figure in Japan, where all of her albums have been reissued on CD and have remained in print on a relatively steady basis. SSJ Records in Japan released three collections of previously unreleased material: Snuggled on Your Shoulder (2006), Lonely and Blue (2007), and What Is There to Say? (2009). This first in the series, Snuggled on Your Shoulder, was reissued by Cellar Door Records in 2010; it features the SSJ Records release in its entirety plus bonus tracks from a discovered radio show. One track from Snuggled on Your Shoulder, "Tea for Two", was released on the Vintage music compilation, This is Vintage Now (2011).

Kenney's vintage 1957 recording of "It's a Most Unusual Day" from her album Beverly Kenney Sings For Playboys is the background song in a late 2021 Lincoln automobile television commercial.

== Discography ==
- Sings for Johnny Smith with Johnny Smith (Roost, 1955)
- Come Swing with Me with Ralph Burns' Orchestra (Roost, 1956)
- Sings with Jimmy Jones and "The Basie-Ites" with Jimmy Jones, Joe Newman, Frank Wess, Freddie Green, Eddie Jones and Jo Jones (Roost, 1957)
- Sings for Playboys with Joe Benjamin and Ellis Larkins (Decca, 1958)
- Born to Be Blue with strings arranged by Hal Mooney and Charles Albertine (Decca, 1959)
- Like Yesterday with Eddie Bert, Stan Free, Al Klink, Bill Pemberton, Johnny Rae, Jerome Richardson, Ed Shaughnessy and Chuck Wayne (Decca, 1959)
- Snuggled on Your Shoulder (SSJ/Cellar Door, 2006)
- Lonely and Blue (SSJ, 2007)
- What is There to Say? (SSJ, 2009)
- Volume 4 (SSJ, 2017)
