= The Impossible Dream (Andy Williams album) =

Compilation album by Andy Williams
- Released: 1971
- Recorded: 1966–1971
- Genres: Film music; show tunes; soundtracks; traditional pop; vocal pop; standards; soft rock
- Length: 64:43
- Label: Columbia

Andy Williams chronology
You've Got a Friend (1971)	The Impossible Dream (1971)	Love Theme from "The Godfather" (1972)

The Impossible Dream is a double compilation album by American pop singer Andy Williams that was released in late 1971 by Columbia Records. Unlike his most recent compilation, Andy Williams' Greatest Hits, this 2-LP set focused exclusively on covers of songs made famous by other artists and included four tracks ("He Ain't Heavy, He's My Brother", "The Last Time I Saw Her", "Long, Long Time", and "Someone Who Cares") that had previously only been available on his UK album titled Love Story. In 2003 these tracks were released on the Williams collection from Collectables Records titled B Sides and Rarities.

The album made its first appearance on Billboard magazine's Top LP's chart in the issue dated January 8, 1972, and remained there for five weeks, peaking at number 123, and it entered the UK album chart three months later, on April 29, and reached number 26 there over the course of three weeks.

== Reception ==
Professional ratings
Review scores
Source	Rating
Billboard	Spotlight Pick
The Encyclopedia of Popular Music	4/5 stars

Billboard magazine recommended the collection in its review for retailers. "What a bargain...two record set from Williams at a special low price and timed right for the holiday shopper. Super program includes, along with the title tune, top readings of '(They Long to Be) Close to You', 'My Sweet Lord', 'Didn't We', 'Love Theme from Romeo and Juliet' and 'Bridge over Troubled Water'. Certain to prove a top chart item."

== Track listing ==
Side one

1. "(They Long to Be) Close to You" (Burt Bacharach, Hal David) – 3:00
2. "The Last Time I Saw Her" (Gordon Lightfoot) – 3:25
3. "What Now, My Love?" (Gilbert Bécaud, Pierre Delanoë, Carl Sigman) – 2:05
4. "I Will Wait for You" from The Umbrellas of Cherbourg (Jacques Demy, Norman Gimbel, Michel Legrand) – 2:42
5. "He Ain't Heavy, He's My Brother" (Bob Russell, Bobby Scott) – 2:59

Side two

1. "Love Theme from Romeo and Juliet" from Romeo and Juliet (Larry Kusik, Nino Rota, Eddie Snyder) – 2:35
2. "Love Is Blue (L'Amour Est Bleu)" (Pierre Cour, André Popp) – 2:46
3. "A Man and a Woman" from A Man and a Woman (Pierre Barouh, Jerry Keller, Francis Lai) – 2:50
4. "Good Morning Starshine" from Hair; performed with The Osmond Brothers and Friends (Galt MacDermot, James Rado, Gerome Ragni) – 4:15
5. "Somewhere My Love" (Maurice Jarre, Paul Francis Webster) – 2:38

Side three

1. "The Impossible Dream (The Quest)" from Man of La Mancha (Joe Darion, Mitch Leigh) – 2:39
2. "My Cherie Amour" (Henry Cosby, Sylvia Moy, Stevie Wonder) – 3:02
3. "Spanish Harlem" (Jerry Leiber, Phil Spector) – 3:09
4. "Someone Who Cares" (Alex Harvey) – 3:15
5. "El Condor Pasa (If I Could)" (Jorge Milchberg, Daniel Alomía Robles, Paul Simon) – 3:25

Side four

1. "Long, Long Time" (Gary White) – 3:37
2. "Both Sides Now" (Joni Mitchell) – 3:43
3. "My Sweet Lord" (George Harrison) – 4:14
4. "Didn't We" (Jimmy Webb) – 3:27
5. "Bridge over Troubled Water" (Paul Simon) – 4:57

== Bibliography ==
- Whitburn, Joel (2010), Joel Whitburn Presents Top Pop Albums, Seventh Edition, Record Research Inc., ISBN 0-89820-183-7
