= The Academy Award–Winning "Call Me Irresponsible" and Other Hit Songs from the Movies =

Studio album by Andy Williams
- Released: 1964
- Recorded: 1964
- Genres: Traditional pop; early pop/rock; film music; soundtracks; standards
- Length: 35:30
- Label: Columbia
- Producer: Robert Mersey

Andy Williams chronology
The Wonderful World of Andy Williams (1964)	The Academy Award–Winning "Call Me Irresponsible" and Other Hit Songs from the Movies (1964)	The Great Songs from "My Fair Lady" and Other Broadway Hits (1964)

Singles from The Academy Award–Winning "Call Me Irresponsible" and Other Hit Songs from the Movies
- 1. "Charade" Released: December 24, 1963

The Academy Award–Winning "Call Me Irresponsible" and Other Hit Songs from the Movies is the fourteenth studio album by American pop singer Andy Williams and was released in the spring of 1964 by Columbia Records. Williams had already had great success with his albums named after Henry Mancini's Oscar winners from 1961 and 1962, "Moon River" and "Days of Wine and Roses", and was asked to sing Mancini and Johnny Mercer's title song collaboration from the 1963 film Charade at the Academy Awards on April 13, 1964, after it was nominated for Best Original Song, but the winner that year was the other song that Williams performed at the ceremony, "Call Me Irresponsible".

The album made its first appearance on Billboard magazine's Top LP's chart in the issue dated May 9, 1964 and remained on the album chart for 63 weeks, peaking at number five. it also debuted on the Cashbox albums chart in the issue dated May 9, 1964, and remained on the chart for in a total of 56 weeks, peaking at four. It received Gold certification from the Recording Industry Association of America on December 18, 1964.

As the B-side of the single "A Fool Never Learns," the album's opening track, "Charade", made its debut on the Billboard Hot 100 on January 18, 1964, spending its only week on the chart at number 100.

The album was released on compact disc as one of two albums on one CD by Collectables Records on March 23, 1999, along with Williams's 1964 Columbia album, The Great Songs from "My Fair Lady" and Other Broadway Hits. This same pairing was also released as two albums on one CD by Sony Music Distribution in 2000. The Academy Award–Winning "Call Me Irresponsible" and Other Hit Songs from the Movies was included in a box set entitled Classic Album Collection, Vol. 1, which contains 17 of his studio albums and three compilations and was released on June 26, 2001.

== Reception ==
Professional ratings
Review scores
Source	Rating
Allmusic	4/5 stars
The Encyclopedia of Popular Music	3/5 stars
Record Mirror	3/5 stars
Disc	5/5 stars

William Ruhlmann of Allmusic was complimentary. "The songs tended to be evocative of a mood rather than specific, and Williams's warm, yet homogenized approach, backed by sympathetic orchestral arrangements with occasional vocal choruses, brought out their haunting, romantic qualities." He even singled out specific tracks. "Especially impressive here were 'Laura,' a version of 'Gigi' with the introductory verse, and a restrained (well, compared to Mario Lanza) 'Be My Love.' But the whole album suggested that Williams and movie songs remained perfect partners."

In their capsule review at the time of its release, Billboard magazine described the album as a "fine collection" and noted that "Andy's singing is most enjoyable".

Cashbox mentions Williams "warm and winning renditions of “More,” “Gigi,” “Love Letters,” “Charade” and many others make for superb listening".

Variety notes "Williams' very effective way with a ballad, in particular way those adult lyrics, is demonstrated here with lucid performances of such songs as 'Charade', 'Laura', 'Madrigal', 'More', 'Gigi', 'The Song from Moulin Rouge', 'Be My Love,' and 'Anniversary Song'.

Nigel Hunter of Disc described the album as "a beautiful album of polished singing" and noted "Andy takes some beautiful songs like Laura and More, all connected with movies and producers." giving the album five-star rating"

Record Mirror noted "he has a great understanding with M. D. Robert Mersey. "Never Stop Loving is a great track, giving it three-star rating." It received the same rating from The Encyclopedia of Popular Music.

== Track listing ==
=== Side one ===
1. "Charade" (Henry Mancini, Johnny Mercer) – 2:35
2. "Mona Lisa" (Ray Evans, Jay Livingston) – 2:54
3. "Call Me Irresponsible" (Sammy Cahn, Jimmy Van Heusen) – 3:10
4. "I'll Never Stop Loving You" (Nicholas Brodszky, Cahn) – 2:38
5. "Madrigal" (Malcolm Arnold, Mack David) – 3:11
6. "Be My Love" (Nicholas Brodszky, Cahn) – 3:15

=== Side two ===
1. "More" (Norman Newell, Nino Oliviero, Riz Ortolani) – 2:32
2. "Laura" (Mercer, David Raksin) – 2:50
3. "Anniversary Song" (Saul Chaplin, Al Jolson) – 2:58
4. "Gigi" (Alan Jay Lerner, Frederick Loewe) – 4:07
5. "The Song from Moulin Rouge" (Georges Auric, William Engvick) – 2:26
6. "Love Letters" (Edward Heyman, Victor Young) – 2:57

== Charts ==
Chart (1964)	Peak position
US Top LPs (Billboard)	5
US Cashbox	4

=== Singles ===
Year	Title	U.S. Hot 100
1964	"Charade"	100

== Grammy nominations ==
This album brought the fifth of six Grammy nominations that Williams received over the course of his career, this time in the category for Best Vocal Performance, Male. This nomination did not focus on the performance of a particular song but rather Williams's performance of the album as a whole. The winner was Louis Armstrong for the single "Hello, Dolly!", a song that Williams went on to record on his next album, The Great Songs from "My Fair Lady" and Other Broadway Hits.

== Personnel ==
From the liner notes for the original album:

- Andy Williams – vocals
- Robert Mersey – arranger (except as noted), conductor, producer
- Dave Grusin – arranger ("More")
- Henry Beau – arranger ("Call Me Irresponsible")
- Frank Bez – photography

== Bibliography ==
- O'Neil, Thomas (1999), The Grammys, Perigree Books, ISBN 0-399-52477-0
- Whitburn, Joel (1985), Joel Whitburn's Top Pop Albums, 1955-1985, Record Research Inc., ISBN 0-89820-054-7
- Whitburn, Joel (1999), Joel Whitburn's Top Pop Singles, 1955-1999, Record Research Inc., ISBN 0-89820-140-3
- Wiley, Mason; Bona, Damien (1996), Inside Oscar: The Unofficial History of the Academy Awards, Ballantine Books, ISBN 0-345-40053-4
- Hoffmann, Frank W (1988), The Cash box album charts, 1955-1974, Scarecrow Press, ISBN 0-810-82005-6
- Larkin, Colin (2007), The Encyclopedia of Popular Music, Omnibus Press, ISBN 9-7818-4609-8567
