= Dear Heart =

1964 American film directed by Delbert Mann

- Theatrical release poster
- Directed by: Delbert Mann
- Written by: Tad Mosel
- Produced by: Martin Manulis
- Starring: Glenn Ford; Geraldine Page; Angela Lansbury; Michael Anderson Jr. Barbara Nichols
- Cinematography: Russell Harlan
- Edited by: Folmar Blangsted
- Music by: Henry Mancini
- Distributed by: Warner Bros. Pictures
- Release date: December 3, 1964 (U.S.)
- Running time: 113 minutes
- Country: United States
- Language: English

Dear Heart is a 1964 American romantic-comedy film starring Glenn Ford and Geraldine Page as lonely middle-aged people who fall in love at a hotel convention. It was directed by Delbert Mann, from a screenplay by Tad Mosel. Its theme song "Dear Heart" was nominated for the Academy Award for Best Original Song.

== Plot ==
Evie Jackson, a middle-aged, single postmaster from small-town Ohio, is attending a postmasters' convention at a New York City hotel. Outgoing, honest, and somewhat tactless, she has many friends but pines for a romantic relationship, one that will be more meaningful than the fling she had out of desperation with a married conventioneer the previous year. She uses various means to make herself feel less lonely and more important, such as sending herself a welcome message and having herself paged in the hotel lobby.

Having accepted a promotion to an office job in New York City, Harry Mork, a middle-aged, womanizing, former traveling salesman for a greeting card company, now wishes to settle down. Harry cordially declines to stay with Daphne Mitchell, the local coworker with whom he has had casual flings. He informs Daphne that he has become engaged to Phyllis, a middle-aged, widowed housewife from Altoona, Pennsylvania.

Harry intends to stay alone, coincidentally in the same hotel as Evie, while he starts his new job and finds an apartment, where Phyllis, who is still back in Altoona, will later join him. While Harry is checking in, Phyllis's son Patrick unexpectedly arrives, seeking to bond with his "new father". Surprised to find Patrick is not the young boy he had expected based on Phyllis’s photograph, Harry instead finds an 18-year-old bohemian with a beard who has been expelled from boarding school. Harry is mildly annoyed by Patrick's arrival and embarrassed by his casual attitude toward women, sex, and nudity, particularly after Patrick moves into Harry's hotel room with his purportedly platonic female friend, Émile Zola Bernkrand.

Evie and Harry first meet when they are forced to share a dinner table in the crowded hotel restaurant, but Harry is more interested in buxom blonde June Loveland, a clerk in the hotel gift shop, than he is in the loquacious and overfamiliar Evie, and he quickly makes an excuse to leave for a tryst with June. Returning afterwards to the hotel, Harry encounters a distraught Evie again in the lobby. She has escaped from near sexual assault by a strange man who followed the overfriendly Evie from the elevator to her room, demanding she let him enter or be accused of soliciting him if she called for help. Consoling her, Harry escorts her safely back to her room, and they bond and make plans to go to the Statue of Liberty the next morning. The next morning, however, when Patrick shows up again wanting to spend the day with Harry, he breaks his date with Evie to look at apartments with Patrick and Zola. After consoling herself attending a postmaster seminar and social event, Evie settles for socializing with a trio of older spinster postmasters she has been actively avoiding. She cheers up when Harry returns, proves that he left a message for her at the front desk about his change of plans, and offers to take her to dinner and show her the apartment he rented in Greenwich Village.

Evie unrealistically hopes Harry is planning to reveal that the apartment he is showing her is intended for the two of them to occupy. She is crushed when she realizes Harry is planning to live there after marrying his fiancée Phyllis. After taking the disappointed Evie back to the hotel, Harry impulsively kisses her, but Phyllis unexpectedly arrives from Altoona. Reluctantly, Harry goes to stay with Phyllis in the hotel across the street, while Evie dejectedly arranges to return to Ohio the next day. Phyllis soon makes it clear to Harry that she does not want to live a future domestic life with him in the old-fashioned apartment he rented. Instead, she wants to live in modern hotels with room service, where she won't have to cook or clean, and she wants to sleep in separate beds. She expects Harry to be a father figure to Patrick so she won't have to deal with Patrick's teenage problems. Realizing he truly loves the caring Evie and that Patrick and Phyllis need to solve their own problems, he breaks his engagement. At the busy train station, he pages Evie just as she is preparing to board to return home, happily reuniting with her.

== Cast ==
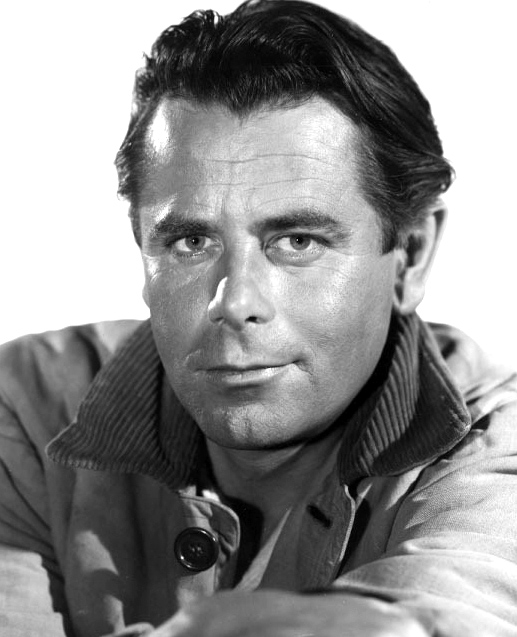
Glenn Ford Plays Harry Mork

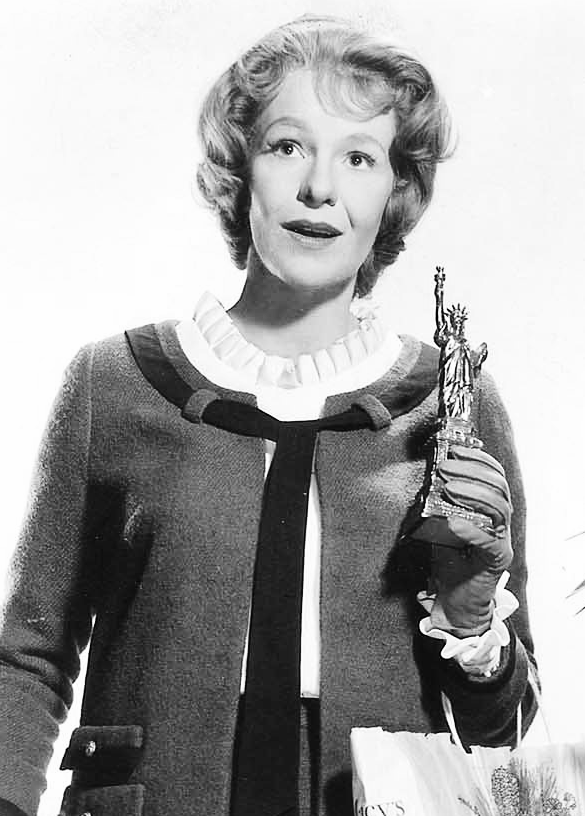
Geraldine Page as Evie Jackson

- Glenn Ford as Harry Mork
- Geraldine Page as Evie Jackson
- Angela Lansbury as Phyllis
- Michael Anderson Jr. as Patrick
- Charles Drake as Frank Taylor
- Richard Deacon as Cruikshank
- Barbara Nichols as June Loveland
- Mary Wickes as Miss Fox
- Ruth McDevitt as Miss Tait
- Alice Pearce as Miss Moore
- Joanna Crawford as Émile Zola Bernkrand
- Patricia Barry as Daphne Mitchell
- Neva Patterson as Connie Templeton
- Ken Lynch as The Masher
- Hal Smith as party reveler
- Ralph Manza as restaurant proprietor

== Production ==
Dear Heart was written by Tad Mosel, from his own story. He originally wrote it as a teleplay for a May 1957 Westinghouse Studio One episode, titled "The Out-Of-Towners", co-starring E.G. Marshall and Eileen Heckart.

The film had a budget of about $1.8 million. Principal shooting occurred from October 3 to November 22, 1963. Filming of the opening and closing scenes in Penn Station took advantage of just-commenced demolition process of the above-ground structures.

It was Geraldine Page's first role as a leading lady. As production began, Glenn Ford's long-term relationship with actress Hope Lange was ending, and she married producer Alan Pakula, leaving Ford heartbroken. Although production of Dear Heart was generally a positive one, Ford could not stop brooding over Lange. Angela Lansbury took the role of the materialistic, good-hearted Phyllis because it gave her an opportunity to work with Geraldine Page.

Henry Mancini was hired to compose music for the film. Mancini felt such a gentle romantic film deserved a theme song. He quickly wrote music for the song, but it lacked lyrics. Mancini contacted Johnny Mercer, who was unavailable. So Mancini turned to Jay Livingston and Ray Evans. The lyricists read the script, and came up with the lyrics and title for the song based on their reading of Geraldine Page's character. The film's original title was "The Out-of-Towners", but Jay Livingston said he changed the title to Dear Heart when Martin Manulis heard the theme song.

Warner Bros. Pictures was uncertain about when to release the film. Mancini, who had a 50% interest in the film's theme song with Larry Shayne, asked studio head Jack L. Warner to release the film so that it would qualify for the March 1965 Academy Awards. Warner agreed to release it for a week in Los Angeles (which, under Academy rules, would qualify it for the Oscars), if Mancini and Shayne would pay for the local advertising. Because this would cost only $10,000, Mancini and Shayne agreed to do so.

The film premiered on December 3, 1964, in Los Angeles, to qualify it for the 1964 awards season. It made its general release premiere at Radio City Music Hall in New York City on March 8, 1965.

== Reception ==
The film received little attention. Bosley Crowther, writing for The New York Times, called it "a stale, dull and humorless pretension at what its producers dare to describe as 'gay, sophisticated comedy,' and it makes almost scandalous misuse of the recognized talents of Geraldine Page." Eleanor Perry, writing for Life, felt that, although the film was aimed at average people, it was condescending and patronizing to them.

Writing in 2008, Leonard Maltin felt it had "excellent characterizations" and a solid supporting cast. Film historians Rob Edelman and Audrey Kupferberg felt Lansbury's performance was thoughtful.

Dear Heart holds a 33% rating on Rotten Tomatoes based on 6 reviews.

== Awards and nominations ==
Award	Category	Nominee(s)	Result	Ref.
Academy Awards	Best Song	"Dear Heart"; Music by Henry Mancini; Lyrics by Jay Livingston and Ray Evans	Nominated	
Golden Globe Awards	Best Motion Picture – Drama		Nominated	
Golden Globe Awards	Best Actress in a Motion Picture – Drama	Geraldine Page	Nominated	
Golden Globe Awards	Best Original Song – Motion Picture	"Dear Heart"; Music by Henry Mancini; Lyrics by Jay Livingston and Ray Evans	Nominated	
Laurel Awards	Top Song	"Dear Heart"; Music by Henry Mancini; Lyrics by Jay Livingston and Ray Evans	Nominated	

== See also ==
- List of American films of 1964

== Bibliography ==
- Edelman, Rob and Kupferberg, Audrey E. Angela Lansbury: A Life on Stage and Screen. Thorndike, Maine: G.K. Hall & Co., 1996.
- Ford, Peter. Glenn Ford: A Life. Madison, Wisc.: University of Wisconsin Press, 2011.
- Maltin, Leonard. Leonard Maltin's 2009 Movie Guide. New York: Plume/Penguin, 2008.
- Mancini, Henry and Lees, Gene. Did They Mention the Music? New York: Cooper Square Press, 2001.
- Matthews, Charles. Oscar A to Z: A Complete Guide to More Than 2,400 Movies Nominated for Academy Awards. New York: Doubleday, 1995.
- Monush, Barry. Screen World Presents the Encyclopedia of Hollywood Film Actors. New York: Applause Theatre and Cinema Books, 2003.
- Sackett, Susan and Rovins, Marcia. Hollywood Sings!: An Inside Look at Sixty Years of Academy Award-Nominated Songs. New York: Billboard Books, 1995.
- Shelley, Peter. Grande Dame Guignol Cinema: A History of Hag Horror From Baby Jane to Mother. Jefferson, N.C.: McFarland & Company, 2009.
