= ...and Roses and Roses =

- Dutch release picture sleeve

Single by Andy Williams
- B-side: "Red Roses for a Blue Lady"
- Released: April 1965
- Genre: Easy Listening
- Length: 2:26
- Label: Columbia Records 43257
- Songwriter(s): Ray Gilbert, Dorival Caymmi
- Producer(s): Robert Mersey

Andy Williams singles chronology
"Dear Heart" (1964)	"...and Roses and Roses" (1965)	"Ain't It True" (1965)

"...and Roses and Roses" is a song written by Dorival Caymmi with English lyrics by Ray Gilbert, and performed by Andy Williams. The song reached #4 on the U.S. adult contemporary chart and #36 on the Billboard chart in 1965.

Astrud Gilberto covered the song on her 1965 album, The Astrud Gilberto Album.
