= Jimmy McHugh =

American songwriter (1894–1969)

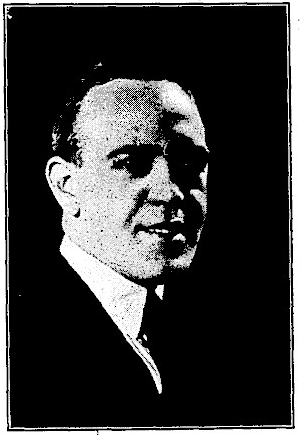
- McHugh in 1921

Background information
- Born: James Francis McHugh; July 10, 1894; Boston, Massachusetts, U.S.
- Died: May 23, 1969 (aged 74) Beverly Hills, California, U.S.
- Occupation: Songwriter

James Francis McHugh (July 10, 1894 – May 23, 1969) was an American composer. One of the most prolific songwriters from the 1920s to the 1950s, he is credited with over 500 songs. His songs were recorded by many artists, including Chet Baker, June Christy, Bing Crosby, Marlene Dietrich, Deanna Durbin, Ella Fitzgerald, Judy Garland, Adelaide Hall, Billie Holiday, Beverly Kenney, Bill Kenny, The Everly Brothers, Peggy Lee, Carmen Miranda, Nina Simone, Frank Sinatra, and Dinah Washington.

== Career ==
McHugh who was of Irish descent began his career in his hometown of Boston, Massachusetts, United States, where he published about a dozen songs with local publishers. His first success was with the World War I song "Keep the Love-Light Burning in the Window Till the Boys Come Marching Home", and this also came near the start of a decade-long collaboration with lyricist Jack Caddigan. After struggling in a variety of jobs, including rehearsal pianist for the Boston Opera House and pianist-song plugger for Irving Berlin's publishing company, in 1921, at the age of 26, McHugh relocated to New York City. Eventually finding employment as a professional manager with the music publisher Jack Mills Inc., it was there that McHugh published his first real hit, "Emaline", and briefly teamed up with Irving Mills as The Hotsy Totsy Boys to write the hit song "Everything Is Hotsy Totsy Now".

This songwriting partnership marked another of McHugh's many collaborations, among them Ted Koehler ("I'm Shooting High"), Al Dubin ("South American Way") and Harold Adamson ("It's a Most Unusual Day"). As impressive as these master lyricists were, perhaps McHugh's best symbiotic musical relationship was with the school teacher and poet Dorothy Fields. Since he had written material for many of Harlem's Cotton Club revues, it would be no coincidence that their first combined success would be the score for the all-black Broadway musical, Blackbirds of 1928, starring Adelaide Hall and Bill Bojangles Robinson, which jump-started the fledgling duo's career with the songs "I Can't Give You Anything But Love", "Diga Diga Doo", and "I Must Have That Man".

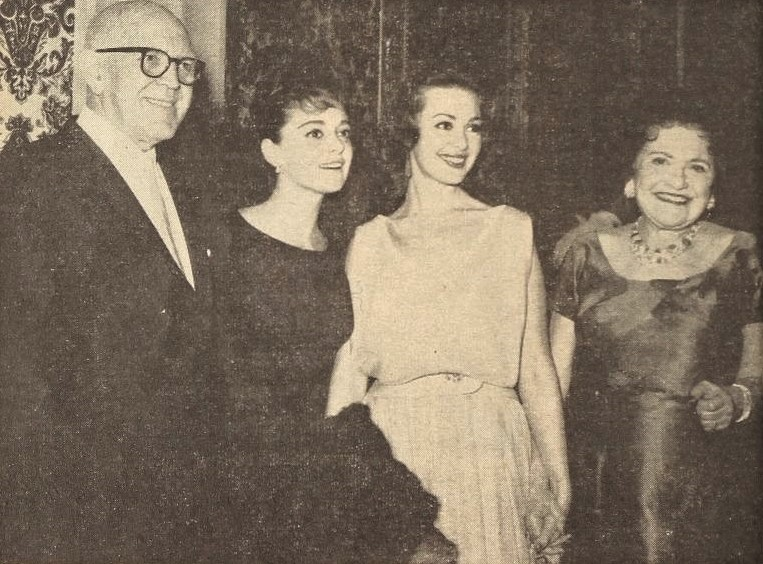
(left to right): Jimmy McHugh, Anna Maria Alberghetti, Barbara Rush and Louella Parsons from Modern Screen, 1960

Other hits written for the stage were soon to follow, including 1930's "On the Sunny Side of the Street" for Lew Leslie's International Revue, which also contained the favorite "Exactly Like You"; "Blue Again" for The Vanderbilt Revue; and in 1932, "Don't Blame Me", which was featured in the Chicago revue Clowns In Clover. Some authors say that Fats Waller was the composer of "On the Sunny Side of the Street," but sold the rights to the song.

McHugh and Fields contributed title songs for films including "Cuban Love Song", "Dinner at Eight" and "Hooray for Love", as well as "I Feel a Song Comin' On" and "I'm in the Mood for Love" from 1935's Every Night at Eight. In the artistically fruitful years after they first collaborated in 1930, McHugh and Fields wrote over 30 songs for the film world. Fields and McHugh finally parted company in 1935. McHugh's longest songwriting partner was Harold Adamson. Adamson provided lyrics to McHugh's compositions. Such hits as "Comin' in on a Wing and a Prayer" found its way into Bartlett's Familiar Quotations.

For the 1948 film A Date with Judy, he composed "It's a Most Unusual Day" for Jane Powell. It became the young singer and actress's signature tune.

McHugh was the manager of Mamie Van Doren during the early part of her career. Van Doren stated in her autobiography that she was unable to get signed to Paramount due to Louella Parsons being jealous of McHugh and Van Doren. However, McHugh was able to get Van Doren signed to Universal in 1953.

McHugh died in Beverly Hills, California, at the age of 74.

== Awards and honors ==
Jimmy McHugh was inducted into the Songwriters Hall of Fame in 1970.

== Works ==
Broadway credits

- 1928 – Blackbirds of 1928 (lyrics by Dorothy Fields)
- 1928 – Hello, Daddy (lyrics by Fields)
- 1930 – International Revue (lyrics by Fields)
- 1939 – The Streets of Paris (lyrics by Al Dubin)
- 1940 – Keep Off The Grass (lyrics by Dubin and Howard Dietz)
- 1948 – As the Girls Go (lyrics by Harold Adamson and musical book by William Roos)

A medley of his songs were included in the 1979 Broadway show Sugar Babies, starring Ann Miller and Mickey Rooney. The songs included were "I Can't Give You Anything but Love", "I'm Shooting High", "Roll Your Blues Away" and "On the Sunny Side of the Street".

Popular songs

- "A Lovely Way to Spend an Evening" – June Christy (McHugh/Adamson) (Capitol/EMI)
- "Blue Again" – Louis Armstrong (McHugh/Fields) (Okeh/Sony BMG)
- "Comin' in on a Wing and a Prayer" – Bing Crosby (McHugh/Adamson) (Decca/UMG)
- "Cuban Love Song" – Edmundo Ros (McHugh/Stothart/Fields) (London/WMG)
- "Diga Diga Doo" – The Mills Brothers w/ Duke Ellington (McHugh/Fields) (Brunswick/Sony BMG)
- "Doin' the New Low Down" – Bill “Bojangles” Robinson (McHugh/Fields) (Brunswick/Sony BMG)
- "Don't Blame Me" – The Everly Brothers (McHugh/Fields) (Warner Bros./WMG)
- "Dream Dream Dream" – Joni James (McHugh/Parish/Melle/Mottier) (MGM/UMG)
- "Exactly Like You" – Aretha Franklin (McHugh/Fields) (Columbia/Sony BMG)
- "Goodbye Blues" - The Mills Brothers (McHugh/Fields) (Brunswick/Sony BMG)
- "Happy Times" – Hal Kemp & His Orchestra (McHugh/Fields) (Brunswick/Sony BMG)
- "I Can't Believe That You're in Love with Me" – Dean Martin (McHugh/Gaskill) (Capitol/EMI)
- "I Can't Give You Anything but Love" – Judy Garland (McHugh/Fields) (Capitol/EMI)
- "I Couldn't Sleep a Wink Last Night" – Frank Sinatra (McHugh/Adamson) (Columbia/Sony BMG)
- "I Just Found Out About Love" – Dinah Washington (McHugh/Adamson) (Mercury/UMG)
- "I Love to Whistle" – Fats Waller (McHugh/Adamson) (RCA/Sony BMG)
- "I'm in the Mood for Love" – Frances Langford (McHugh/Fields) (Regal Zonophone)
- "I Must Have That Man" – Billie Holiday (McHugh/Fields) (Brunswick/Sony BMG)
- "I'm Shooting High" – Ann Richards (McHugh/Koehler) (Capitol/EMI)
- "It's a Most Unusual Day" – Andy Williams (McHugh/Adamson) (Columbia/Sony BMG)
- "I've Got My Fingers Crossed" – Louis Armstrong (McHugh/Koehler) (Decca/UMG)
- "Let's Get Lost" – Chet Baker (McHugh/Loesser) (Pacific)
- "My! My!" - Tommy Dorsey w/ The Pied Pipers (McHugh/Loesser) (RCA/Sony BMG)
- "On the Sunny Side of the Street" – Frank Sinatra (McHugh/Fields) (Capitol/EMI)
- "Say It (Over and Over Again)" - Tommy Dorsey w/ Frank Sinatra (McHugh/Loesser) (RCA/Sony BMG)
- "South American Way" – The Andrews Sisters (McHugh/Dubin) (Capitol/EMI)
- "Take it Easy" - Fats Waller [1935]
- "There's Something in the Air" – Ruth Etting (McHugh/Adamson) (Decca/UNI)
- "Too Young to Go Steady" – Nat King Cole (McHugh/Adamson) (Capitol/EMI)
- "Warm and Willing" – Nat King Cole (McHugh/Livingston/Evans) (Capitol/EMI)
- "When My Sugar Walks Down the Street" – Peggy Lee (McHugh/Austin/Mills) (Capitol/EMI)
- "Where Are You?" – Johnny Mathis (McHugh/Adamson) (Columbia/Sony BMG)
