= A Date with Judy (film) =

1948 film by Richard Thorpe

- Theatrical release poster
- Directed by: Richard Thorpe
- Screenplay by: Dorothy Cooper; Dorothy Kingsley
- Based on: A Date with Judy radio series by Aleen Leslie
- Produced by: Joe Pasternak
- Starring: Wallace Beery; Jane Powell; Elizabeth Taylor; Carmen Miranda; Xavier Cugat; Robert Stack
- Cinematography: Robert Surtees
- Edited by: Harold F. Kress
- Music by: Ernesto Lecuona
- Distributed by: Metro-Goldwyn-Mayer
- Release date: July 29, 1948
- Running time: 113 minutes
- Country: United States
- Language: English
- Budget: $1.3 million or $2 million
- Box office: $4.6 million

A Date with Judy is a 1948 American Technicolor musical romantic comedy film directed by Richard Thorpe and starring Wallace Beery, Jane Powell and Elizabeth Taylor. The film is based on the radio series of the same name.

The film features Powell's soprano singing voice and also features musical performances by Brazilian singer Carmen Miranda and Spanish bandleader Xavier Cugat. The songs "Judaline" and "It's a Most Unusual Day" also debuted in the film.

== Plot ==
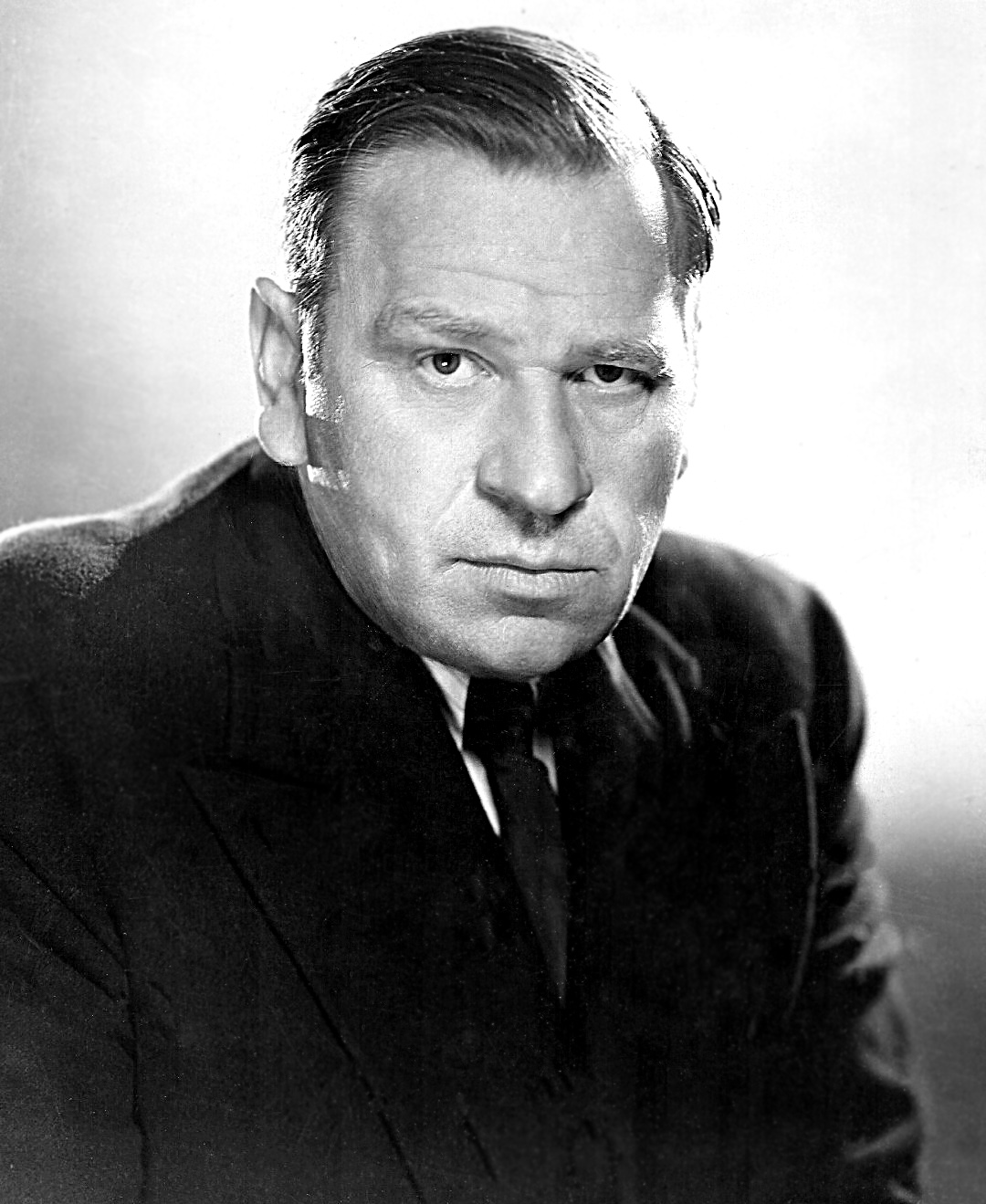
Wallace Beery as Oogie Pringle

Carol Pringle and Ogden "Oogie" Pringle are teenage siblings in a wealthy family in Santa Barbara, California. Their father is Lucien Pringle, a widower who owns a radio station in the city. Judy Foster is Carol's best friend and Oogie's girlfriend. She is the daughter of Dora and Melvin Foster.

The high school is holding a dance tonight, with the famous bandleader Xavier Cugat as guest of honor. Oogie and Judy are set to attend it. However, Carol convinces Oogie to cancel his date with Judy. She tells her brother that women are more attracted to men who ignore them. When Judy learns that Oogie has cancelled their date, she vows to end their relationship. Dejected, she visits "Pop" Sam Scully's drugstore, where she meets Pop's nephew, Stephen Andrews. He agrees to escort her to the dance as a favor to Pop.

At the high school dance that evening, Oogie sees Judy arrive with Stephen and becomes jealous. While Oogie tries to divert Judy's attention away from Stephen, Stephen meets Carol and they dance together.

After the dance, Carole now understands how much Judy means to Oogie and schemes to reunite them. She tells Judy that Lucien is going to give Judy and Oogie a program on his radio station. At a dinner arranged by Carol, Oogie tries to make amends with Judy. However, when Judy accidentally falls, she wrongly accuses him of pushing her. Stephen later assures Oogie that he would never take Judy from him. Judy tells her father Melvin Foster that she loves Stephen and intends to marry him.

After a circumstantial misunderstanding, Judy believes that Melvin is having an affair with rumba instructor Rosita Conchellas. Judy runs home and gives Dora a beauty makeover to make her mother more appealing to her husband Melvin.

Upon learning that Carol is in love with Stephen, Lucien performs a background check on Stephen. Stephen confronts Lucien, declaring that he now understands why Carol is spoiled and egotistical. Lucien pledges to be more attentive to his children. Oogie visits Judy's house and tries to serenade her. However, she gets upset after learning that he is taking a fishing trip and might miss their radio show.

On the following day, Judy and Carol see Melvin escorting Rosita to his car. That night, Melvin and Dora are holding an anniversary celebration. At the party, Judy and Carol accuse Rosita of having an affair with Melvin. At first, Rosita misunderstands the accusation, thinking they are talking about Xavier, her fiancé. Rosita understands the mix-up. She tells the girls that Melvin asked her to teach him the rumba as a surprise for Dora. Judy and Carol then apologize to Rosita.

At the end of the film, Judy reconciles with Oogie after learning that Carol loves Stephen. He agrees to resume his romance with Carol in a few years when she is older and more mature.

== Cast ==
- Wallace Beery as Melvin Colner Foster
- Jane Powell as Judy Foster
- Elizabeth Taylor as Carol Pringle
- Carmen Miranda as Rosita Cochellas
- Xavier Cugat as himself (credited as "Xavier Cugat and His Orchestra" in opening credits)
- Robert Stack as Stephen I. Andrews
- Scotty Beckett as Ogden "Oogie" Pringle
- Selena Royle as Dora Foster
- Leon Ames as Lucien T. Pringle
- Clinton Sundberg as Jameson
- George Cleveland as Gramps
- Lloyd Corrigan as "Pop" Sam Scully
- Jerry Hunter as Randolph Foster
- Jean McLaren as Mitzi Hoffman
- Stuart Whitman as young man in ballroom (uncredited)
- Lillian Yarbo as Nightingale (uncredited)
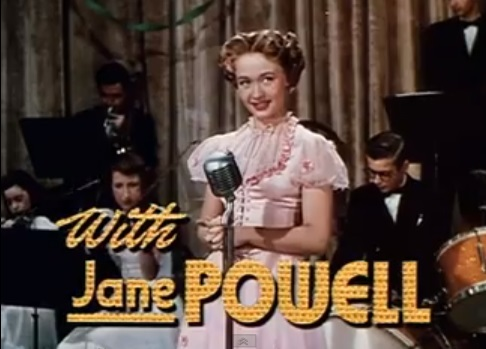

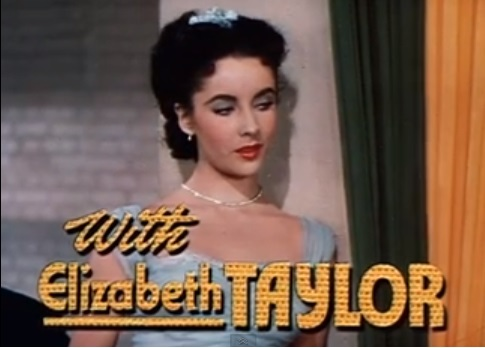

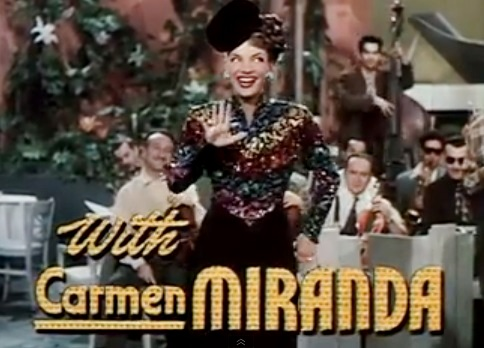

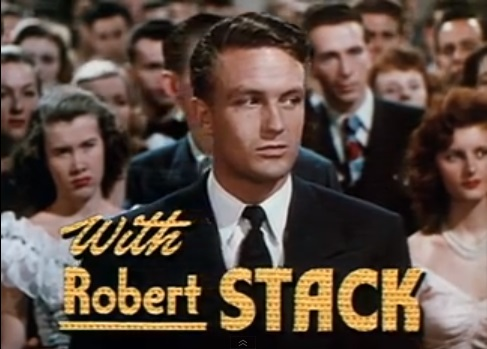

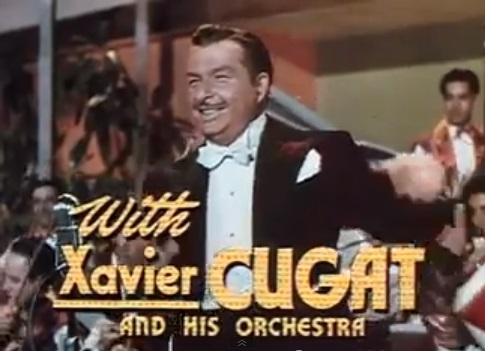

== Songs ==
- "It's a Most Unusual Day" (Jimmy McHugh, Harold Adamson), performed by Jane Powell
- "Judaline" (Don Raye, Gene de Paul), performed by Jane Powell, Scotty Beckett & Quartet
- "I'm Strictly on the Corny Side" (Stella Unger, Alec Templeton), performed by Jane Powell & Scotty Beckett
- "Cuanto Le Gusta" (Gabriel Ruiz, Ray Gilbert), performed by Carmen Miranda with Xavier Cugat and His Orchestra
- "Cooking with Gas", performed by Carmen Miranda with Xavier Cugat and His Orchestra
- "Love Is Where You Find It" (Earl K. Brent, Nacio Herb Brown), performed by Jane Powell, Jerry Hunter & Selena Royle
- "Home Sweet Home" (H.R. Bishop), performed by Jane Powell, Jerry Hunter & Selena Royle
- "Swing Low, Sweet Chariot" (Wallace Willis), performed by Lillian Yarbo

== Production ==
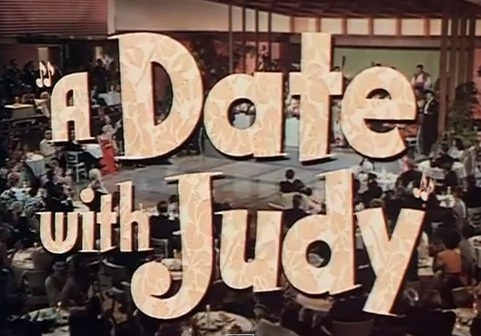
Original theatrical trailer

A Date with Judy was produced by Joe Pasternak. The film was a great success, particularly highlighted by the musical number "Cuanto Le Gusta," performed by Carmen Miranda.

Thomas E. Breen was initially cast to co-star in the film alongside Jane Powell, while Leslie Kardos was assigned as director. Actress Selena Royle replaced Mary Astor, who withdrew due to health issues. Vincente Minnelli's biography mentions that a musical number titled "Mulligatawny," created by Stanley Donen, was cut from the final version of the film.

Robert Stack was almost twice as old as Elizabeth Taylor, who played his romantic interest. The last day of filming was January 27, 1948; at that time Stack was 29 and Taylor was 15.

The screenplay is based on a radio program that aired from 1941 to 1949 on NBC, and then from 1949 to 1950 on ABC. The character "Judy Foster" was portrayed on the radio by Dellie Ellis, Louise Erickson, and Ann Gillis. Later, actress Patricia Crowley played "Judy Foster" in the eponymous television series, which aired on ABC from 1951 to 1953.

== Release ==
The film spent four weeks at the top of the U.S. box office, earning theatrical rentals of $3,431,000 in the United States and Canada and $1,155,000 elsewhere, resulting in a profit of $1,495,000.

== Reception ==
Craig Butler's review of A Date with Judy describes the film as a light and charming musical, typical of 1940s and 1950s Hollywood. He highlights the cheerful tone and simple structure of the plot, which is exaggerated and improbable, yet still manages to maintain a steady pace. Director Richard Thorpe ensures a light-hearted approach, while Stanley Donen's choreography is fast-paced and creative. Jane Powell is mentioned for her exaggerated energy, though her performance of "It's a Most Unusual Day" is praised. Elizabeth Taylor, while stunning, brings more depth to her role than is required, and Wallace Beery is described as captivating. Carmen Miranda is also noted for her energy, especially in her performance of "Cuanto Le Gusta." Despite being dated and superficial in its views on women, the film is still considered moderately enjoyable.

Variety's review highlights the youthful enthusiasm and light entertainment of A Date with Judy, based on the characters created by Aleen Leslie. Jane Powell is praised for her attractive presence, with emphasis on her vocal performances in five numbers and her comedic antics that drive the plot forward. The song "It's a Most Unusual Day" by Jimmy McHugh and Harold Adamson is described as the highlight, being repeated at the end. Carmen Miranda is also mentioned for her usual energy in "Cooking with Glass" and "Cuanto Le Gusta," leaving a strong impression.

Tony Sloman of Radio Times gives A Date with Judy a rating of 3 out of 5 stars, considering it a charming musical from MGM's golden age, though a bit long and corny by modern standards. He highlights sweet Jane Powell in the lead role and praises the opportunity for Elizabeth Taylor to shine. Wallace Beery, though at the end of his career, still stands out, despite Technicolor not being flattering to his appearance. Sloman also mentions that Beery manages to perform alongside Carmen Miranda, and emphasizes the success of the song "It's a Most Unusual Day".

In his review for The New York Times, Thomas F. Brady notes that the film follows Hollywood's established conventions for teen comedies but remains pleasantly entertaining within that familiar format. He acknowledges that Metro-Goldwyn-Mayer's formula for such comedies is effective, even though it has been worn out by years of repetition. Brady concludes that the film provides acceptable summer entertainment for those not overly tired of typical teen plots and their predictable attitudes.

Andrea Passafiume of Turner Classic Movies discusses Elizabeth Taylor's transformation from a youthful actress to a sex symbol, portraying a "bad girl" in contrast to Jane Powell’s "good girl." She highlights the friendship between the two actresses and how Taylor seized the opportunity to change her on-screen image, a shift crucial to her career. The review also praises the film's musical numbers, such as "It's a Most Unusual Day" and "Judaline," with Carmen Miranda standing out as the rumba teacher Rosita, particularly in her performance of "Cuanto Le Gusta." Xavier Cugat is also mentioned for bringing his Latin energy to the film. Wallace Beery, as Judy's father, receives mixed reviews from Powell, who describes him as difficult to work with, though she respected him as an actor.
