= Almost There (Andy Williams song) =

- Dutch release picture sleeve

Single by Andy Williams

from the album Andy Williams' Dear Heart
- B-side: "On the Street Where You Live"
- Released: November 1964
- Genre: Easy Listening
- Length: 2:57
- Label: Columbia Records 43128
- Songwriters: Gloria Shayne, Jerry Keller
- Producer: Robert Mersey

Andy Williams singles chronology
"On the Street Where You Live" (1964)	"Almost There" (1964)	"Dear Heart" (1964)

"Almost There" is a song written by Gloria Shayne and Jerry Keller and performed by Andy Williams in his film I'd Rather Be Rich (1964). The song reached #12 on the U.S. adult contemporary chart and #67 on the Billboard chart in 1964. It also reached #2 in the UK in October 1965 for three weeks. The B-side, "On the Street Where You Live", was also a hit, reaching #3 on the adult contemporary chart and #28 on the Billboard Hot 100.

== Cover versions ==
- Brenda Lee covered the song for her album The Versatile Brenda Lee (1965).
