= I'd Rather Be Rich =

1964 film by Jack Smight

- Theatrical release poster
- Directed by: Jack Smight
- Written by: Oscar Brodney; Norman Krasna; Leo Townsend
- Produced by: Ross Hunter
- Starring: Sandra Dee; Robert Goulet; Andy Williams; Maurice Chevalier
- Cinematography: Russell Metty
- Edited by: Milton Carruth
- Music by: Percy Faith
- Distributed by: Universal Pictures
- Release date: August 26, 1964
- Running time: 96 minutes
- Country: United States
- Language: English

I'd Rather Be Rich is a 1964 American romantic comedy film with musical aspects directed by Jack Smight, produced by Ross Hunter and starring Sandra Dee. The film focuses on a dying man who wishes to meet his granddaughter's fiancé, but he is unavailable, so the woman persuades another man to substitute for him. Then the grandfather recovers.

The film is a remake of the 1941 film It Started with Eve, with the genders reversed.

== Plot ==
During the opening credits Robert Goulet and Andy Williams perform a duet "I'd Rather Be Rich".

We first meet Cynthia Dulaine sitting at a nightclub table while Warren Palmer croons to her "It Had To Be You".

Suddenly, Cynthia is called away to her dying grandfather's bedside. Philip Dulaine is the founder and CEO of Dulaine Enterprises and Cynthia is his closest surviving relative and heir. He tells her that his dying wish is for her to find the right man to marry. She's happy to tell him of the "kind, considerate and handsome" Warren Palmer whom Philip has never met and to whom she has recently become engaged. Philip asks to meet Warren as soon as possible for the end seems close at hand.

Stuck in Boston because of airport difficulties, Warren is unable to be with Cynthia. Realizing that Philip will die a happier man if he can meet her fiancé, Cynthia approaches a stranger and asks if he would pose as Warren for an introduction to her grandfather. This man is Paul Benton, who has invented a heat-proof paint and desperately wants an audience with Philip Dulaine whose company has a contract with NASA. So, Benton agrees and the ruse is pulled off very successfully with Philip favorably impressed by the young man he believes to be Cynthia's fiancé. Especially after Philip makes the two kiss and sees Cynthia kick off her shoes just as her grandmother always did when Philip and she would kiss.

Philip tells the "couple" that Dulaine Enterprises is in danger of a hostile take-over and implores Cynthia to meet with the board to try to save the company. He insists against her protest that she take her "fiancé" along. The meeting at first proves disastrous for Cynthia until Benton announces that Cynthia will put her own money into the company. This satisfies the board, but Cynthia later tells Benton she is outraged with him for offering up her money without checking with her first. However, she does help him by sending him off on an interview with the best person at the company to help get his paint invention tested by NASA.

Meanwhile, back at the Dulaine mansion and unbeknown to Cynthia, Philip has unexpectedly recovered and feels as healthy as ever. Throughout the rest of the film, he and his nurse perform a comical cat and mouse game - she trying to stop him from smoking the many cigars he has hidden around the mansion.

Philip learns of Benton's success with the board and now surely approves of his granddaughter's choice in a fiancé. But then Philip learns all about the ruse when he overhears Cynthia tell Benton that his presence is no longer required since the real Warren Palmer is arriving that afternoon.

Because Philip likes Paul Benton so much and thinks he is the right man for his granddaughter, he continues to pretend to be at death's door. Whenever Cynthia tries to tell him who her real fiancé is, he coughs and feigns a weak heart making her afraid to shock him in any way. This makes it necessary for Benton to stick around and Philip uses the situation to his advantage - playing matchmaker in an attempt to ensure his granddaughter's happiness. After all, Philip is certain Benton spells true love for Cynthia since she cannot keep her shoes on whenever they are together.

Later that afternoon, the real Warren Palmer arrives at the Dulaine mansion and is reluctantly forced to pose as Paul Benton. Meanwhile, Benton realizes he's fallen for Cynthia, so he manages to hamper some late night amorous activity between the engaged couple and also boobie-traps a romantic getaway they go off on together. In the car on the way over, Palmer serenades Cynthia with the song "Almost There". But their rendezvous is sabotaged by the jealous Benton and they are forced to return early.

Philip sends Cynthia and Benton to attend a shareholders' dinner dance, a scheme to have them spend more time together. They have a very enjoyable evening, until it ends up with the two rivals for Cynthia's affection fist fighting on the mansion's lawn.

Finally Philip tells Cynthia that he is no longer dying and that her recent foot problems, just like her grandmother's condition, signifies which of the two men she truly loves. After a few more comedic scenes, Cynthia breaks off her engagement with Warren Palmer and winds up with Paul Benton.

== Cast ==
- Sandra Dee as Cynthia Dulaine
- Robert Goulet as Paul Benton
- Andy Williams as Warren Palmer
- Maurice Chevalier as Philip Dulaine
- Gene Raymond as Martin Wood
- Charles Ruggles as Dr. Charles Crandall
- Hermione Gingold as Miss Grimshaw
- Allen Jenkins as Fred
- Laurie Main as Harrison
- Dort Clark as Albert
- Hayden Rorke as MacDougall

== Production ==
=== Development ===
The film was originally known as The Richest Girl in Town and was a remake of It Started with Eve. Producer Ross Hunter, who had enjoyed a great deal of success remaking movies from the 1930s and 1940s, announced the project in January 1963. Sandra Dee was attached from the beginning.

In May 1963 Hunter said his ideal cast was Dee, Maurice Chevalier, Andy Williams and George Hamilton. It was Williams' first credited film role (he sang, uncredited, in multiple earlier films, including Janie (1944 film)); he later signed a seven-year contract with Universal to make one film a year. In October Jim Hutton was announced as Dee's leading man. By November he had been replaced by Robert Goulet.

In November Jack Smight signed to direct. Smight was an experienced television director keen on getting into movies; his agent told him Hunter "wants a seasoned TV director who can shoot it fast, cheap, and good" and was interested in Smight. The director read the script "and didn’t like it. The comedy premise was fine, but it just wasn’t funny enough."

Smight met with Hunter who "did a persuasive selling job. How could I, as a novice to film, turn down a first feature picture" although he says at the back of his mind he felt "Outside of Maurice Chevalier and Hermione Gingold, there wasn’t a real actor amongst the whole cast.” However his "realistic judgement told me that this was a shot at the big screen and I should take it."

Smight asked if he could hire a comedy writer to do a two-week rewrite and Hunter agreed. Smight got in John Bradford, a former stage manager turned comedy writer. They worked on the script for two weeks and Hunter liked the results.

By January 1964 the title had been changed to I'd Rather Be Rich.

=== Filming ===
Filming took place over 26 days with a budget of less than a million dollars.

Smight told the press during filming that Hunter "wants the best, within the limits of his medium and he knows how to get it. The picture's what it seems to be but there is a good chemistry going on among the actors. It feels good."

The director said later that Hunter scolded him for changing lines during shooting.

== Reception ==
The Los Angeles Times praised the "strong cast" but said the script "lacks inspiration" and said "so little use is made of so many famous singing voices."

Smight later said "it was not a particularly good script but it opened up a whole new life for me" as a director.

He said the film got a good review from Time magazine, and a few days later walked past Hunter on the Universal lot. "He glanced at me sourly and then looked away without speaking," said Smight. "Obviously he had read Time Magazine. I had no doubt that I would never work for Mr. Hunter again. After all these years, the movie continues to play on television and the residuals flow freely into our household, thank God! In the years that followed, I never had to contend with a producer who insisted that I never change a line of dialogue."
