= May Each Day (song) =

- 1971 Dutch release picture sleeve

Single by Andy Williams

from the album Days of Wine and Roses and Other TV Requests
- B-side: "Bye Bye Blues"
- Released: May 1966
- Genre: Easy listening
- Length: 2:50
- Label: CBS Records 202042
- Songwriters: George Wyle, Mort Green
- Producer: Robert Mersey

Andy Williams singles chronology
"Quiet Nights of Quiet Stars (Corcovado)" (1965)	"May Each Day" (1966)	"You're Gonna Hear from Me" (1966)

"May Each Day" is a song written by George Wyle and Mort Green and performed by Andy Williams. The song reached #19 in the UK in 1966. It originally appeared on his 1963 album Days of Wine and Roses and Other TV Requests.

== Background ==
The song was often used to close his shows, such as The Andy Williams Show, where he sang "...May each day of your life be a good day, and good night." It was also played during his memorial service
