= List of atonal compositions =

This is an incomplete list of atonal musical compositions. Pieces are listed by composer.

== B ==
- Béla Bartók
  - Eight Improvisations on Hungarian Peasant Songs, Op. 20
  - Three Etudes for Piano, Op. 18
  - First Sonata for Violin and Piano (1921)
  - Second Sonata for Violin and Piano (1922)
- John J. Becker
  - Symphonia brevis (1929)
  - Concerto arabesque (1930)
- Alban Berg
  - Lulu
  - Wozzeck
  - Chamber Concerto (1925)
- Johanna Beyer
  - Clusters (1936)
- Chester Biscardi
  - At the Still Point (1977)
- Henry Brant
  - Ghost Nets (1988)

== C ==
- Julián Carrillo
  - Symphony No. 3 (1940)
- Elliott Carter
  - String Quartet No. 1 (1950)
- Ruth Crawford Seeger
  - Nine preludes for piano (1925–28)
  - Piano Study in Mixed Accents (1930)
- George Crumb
  - Echoes of Time and the River (1967)
  - Black Angels (1970)
  - Ancient Voices of Children (1970)
  - Makrokosmos (1972-1979)
  - A Little Suite for Christmas, A.D. 1979 (1980)

== D ==
- Mario Davidovsky
  - String Quartet No. 1 (1954)
  - Concertino for Percussion and String Orchestra (1954)
  - Noneto (1956)

== E ==
- Duke Ellington
  - The Clothed Woman (1947)

== F ==
- Vivian Fine
  - Four Polyphonic Pieces for Piano (1931)
  - Four Songs (1933)
- Lukas Foss
  - Time Cycle (1960)
  - Echoi (1963)

== G ==
- Miriam Gideon
  - The Hound of Heaven (1945)
  - String Quartet (1946)
  - Symfonia Brevis (1953)
  - Mixco (1957)
  - Of Shadows Numberless (1966)

== K ==
- Leon Kirchner
  - Piano Trio No. 1 (1954)
  - String Quartet No. 3 (1966)
  - Lily (1977)
  - Music for Twelve (1985)
  - Music for Cello and Orchestra (1992)
- Ernst Krenek
  - Symphony No. 2 (1922)

== L ==
- Franz Liszt
  - Album-Leaf 'Prélude omnitonique', S.166e
  - Bagatelle sans tonalité (1885), S.216a

== M ==
- Nicholas Maw
  - Essay (1961)
  - Scenes and Arias (1962)

== P ==
- Zoltan Paulinyi
  - LUME 1 + 2 for solo viola pomposa and 2 orchestras (2018)
  - Biblioteca (alias Library): chamber opera (2011)
  - Preço do Perdão: chamber opera (2012)
- Henri Pousseur
  - Exercices (1956)
- Krzysztof Penderecki
  - Emanationem
  - Partita per harpsichord

== R ==
- Dane Rudhyar
  - Pentagrams Nos. 1-4 (1924–26)
  - Three Paeans (1925–27)
  - Granites (1929)
- Carl Ruggles
  - Angels (1921)
  - Vox clamans in deserto (1923)
  - Portals (1926)
  - Sun-Treader (1933)

== S ==
- Arnold Schoenberg
  - George Lieder [The Book of the Hanging Gardens] (1909), Op. 15/1
  - Erwartung (1909), Op. 17
  - String Quartet No. 2 (1907-1908), Op. 10, last movement
  - Five Pieces for Orchestra (Fünf Orchesterstücke) (1909), Op. 16
  - Pierrot lunaire (1912), Op. 21
  - Drei Klavierstücke (1909), Op. 11
  - Four Orchestral Songs (1916), Op. 22
  - Die glückliche Hand, Op. 18
  - Herzgewächse (1911), Op. 20
  - Die Jakobsleiter
  - Sechs kleine Klavierstücke (1913), Op. 19
  - Five Pieces for Piano, Op. 23
- Igor Stravinsky
  - The Rite of Spring (1913)

== T ==
- Louise Talma
  - Thirteen Ways of Looking at a Blackbird (1979)
  - The Ambient Air (1981)
  - Full Circle (1985)

== V ==
- Edgard Varèse
  - Density 21.5 (1936)
  - Offrandes (1922)
  - Intégrales (1925)
  - Arcana (1927)
  - Déserts (1954)

== W ==
- Anton Webern
  - Five Movements (1909), Op. 5
  - Six Pieces (1910), Op. 6
  - Six Bagatelles (1913), Op. 9
- Stefan Wolpe
  - Enactments (1953)
  - Symphony (1956)

== Other composers ==
Other composers with atonal pieces include Harrison Birtwistle & Peter Maxwell Davies, Jacob Druckman, Barbara Kolb, Henry Cowell, Claude Debussy, Brian Ferneyhough, Alexander Goehr, Lou Harrison, Mårten Hagström, Paul Hindemith, Karel Husa, Charles Ives, György Ligeti, Witold Lutosławski, George Perle, Sergei Prokofiev, David Raksin, Nikolai Roslavets, Hermann Schroeder, Alexander Scriabin, Charles Seeger, Pierre Boulez, Fartein Valen, Tyshawn Sorey, and Iannis Xenakis.

== See also ==
- List of dodecaphonic and serial compositions
- List of music students by teacher
- List of tone rows and series
