= Star-Child =

Musical work by George Crumb

- Music for voices and orchestra by George Crumb
- First page of the score
- Text: from Dies irae and Gospel of John
- Language: Latin
- Composed: 1977
- Dedication: Irene Gubrud, Pierre Boulez, New York Philharmonic, and David and Peter Crumb
- Performed: May 5, 1977: New York City
- Movements: 7
- Scoring: soprano; antiphonal children's voices; male speaking choir; handbells; large orchestra

Star-Child is a piece written in 1977 for orchestra and voices by the American composer George Crumb. Harold C. Schonberg of The New York Times said of the work, "Star-Child…is sensitive, powerful, full of personality, and it marks a significant step in Mr. Crumb's development…. This is big music and even passionate music. In a way, it is a synthesis both of what Mr. Crumb has been doing and of many contemporary techniques. Mr. Crumb has tied everything together, creating a score that transcends any derivations."

== Composition and premiere ==
Star-Child was commissioned by the Ford Foundation and completed in March, 1977. It is Crumb's largest work and calls for soprano and trombone soloists, antiphonal children's voices, male speaking choir, bell ringers, and large orchestra. The score requires 4 flutes (also playing 4 piccolos), 4 oboes (1 doubling on English horn), 3 clarinets in B♭, 1 clarinet in E♭, 3 bassoons, 1 contrabassoon (doubling as bassoon 4), 6 horns, 5 trumpets in C, 2 trumpets in D, 3 trombones (trombone 1 is the soloist during the first part of the work), 1 tuba, 8 percussionists, 1 organ, children's voices I and II (SASA), male speaking choir playing handbells, violins I, violins II, violas, cellos, and contrabasses. Two primary conductors and two secondary conductors are also needed.

Star-Child was composed for Irene Gubrud (soprano), conductor Pierre Boulez, and the New York Philharmonic, who performed the world premiere on May 5, 1977. The trombone soloist was Edward Herman, Jr. Boulez was assisted by conductors David Gilbert, James Chambers, and Larry Newland. Gubrud, the Boys' Choirs of the Little Church Around the Corner and Trinity School, and the Bell Ringers of Trinity School in New York all sang in the premiere. The score is dedicated to Crumb's two sons, David and Peter.

The title Star-Child derives from two earlier Crumb compositions. "Twin Suns (Doppelgänger aus der Ewigkeit)," the fourth piece of Makrokosmos, Volume II (1973) for amplified solo piano, includes a "Hymn for the Advent of the Star-Child." (Crumb notates "Twin Suns" around two circles, another link to Star-Child.) In 1974, Crumb completed Music for a Summer Evening (Makrokosmos III), for two amplified pianos and two percussionists. In the third movement, "The Advent," the composer expands material from "Twin Suns," and designates the closing part of the movement “Hymn for the Nativity of the Star-Child."

== Musical idioms ==
Star-Child, much like other pieces written by Crumb, deals with Biblical quotations and a contrast between light and dark. Throughout the piece is a sense of leaving a place of despair and darkness and reaching the freeing nature of lightness. This theme is reflected in both the progression of the music as well as in the text. The piece begins with the dark section featuring the lower, darker-sounding instruments. In contrast, children's singing and handbells are prominent at the end of Star-Child.

Four conductors are required to conduct all of the musicians in Star-Child. The first conducts all of the vocal passages, the winds, and six of the percussionists until the very end of the piece. The second leads all of the strings and two of the percussionists. The third only directs during the last movement when the brass and winds divide into smaller groups. When this happens, he/she directs the brass and three percussionists. During this same movement, a fourth conducts another smaller group consisting of the clarinets, flutes, and vibraphone.

The eight percussionists play nontraditional instruments such as iron chains, flexatones, pot lids, sizzle cymbals, metal thunder sheets, log drums, and wind machines. The more traditional percussion instruments are often used in nontraditional ways as well.

Star-Child is divided into seven movements:

1. Introduction: Desolato
2. Vox Clamans In Deserto
3. Ascensus Potestatum Tenebrarum
4. Musica Apocalyptica
5. Seven Trumpets of the Apocalypse
6. Adventus Puerorum Luminis
7. Hymnus Pro Novo Tempore

Although Star-Child is written for a large orchestra, Movement 4, Musica Apocalyptica, is the only movement that utilizes every musician.

The main musical idea throughout the piece is "Music of the Spheres", which is played by the strings and made up of chords built of perfect fifths. This melody "moves throughout the work in a circular and therefore static manner, a kind of background music over which the human drama is enacted". This circular movement of the melody is visually depicted on the first page of the score, shown below. Over this melody, Crumb superimposed sequences of contrasting musical lines in the style of Charles Ives. Because these superimposed lines have different tempos and metrics, four conductors are needed. The different tempos and metrics shown by the conductors’ batons create unusual visual choreography.

There are many programmed and visual allusions throughout Star-Child. For example, seven sounding trumpets are used to represent the seven trumpets of the apocalypse. Two of the trumpet players sit in the audience, while five are positioned throughout the concert hall. Also, four drummers playing sixteen tom-toms represent the four horsemen of the apocalypse.

== Text ==
The Latin text of Star-Child was adapted from Dies irae and Massacre of the Innocents of the thirteenth century, as well as John 12:36 which says, "While ye have light, believe in the light, that ye may be the children of light. These things spake Jesus, and departed, and did hide himself from them." Crumb used Latin text because he believed it conveyed a universal meaning of finding a way out of despair to a hopeful and bright future. Although four conductors are required for this piece, only conductor number one conducts the vocal lines.

The first phrase of Dies irae is specifically used in the fourth movement as well as at the very end of the piece. The second movement contains text from Dies irae as well, which is sung by a solo soprano in a duet with a solo trombonist located in front of the orchestra between solo vocalists. The final text of the piece comes from John 12:36.

== English translation of text ==
Soprano:

"Voice crying in the wilderness"

Deliver me, O Lord from eternal death
on that dreadful day
when the heavens and the earth shall be moved,
and Thou shalt come to judge the world by fire.
O Lord, deliver me from eternal death!
I am seized with fear and trembling
when I reflect upon the judgment and wrath to come.
Deliver me, O Lord, from eternal death.

Soprano:

"Advent of the children of light"

O Lord, grant them light!
The ancient law is no more,
Gone are the rites of old!
Already the blind
See a ray of light!
And the bonds of death are broken!

Children:

"Hymn for the new age"

Light shines in the darkness!
Exult in God!
Glory on high!
Rejoice in God!

Soprano:

Their bonds are nearly broken,
For born in the king of glory!

Children:

Light shines in the darkness!
Glory on high!
Exult in God!
Rejoice in God!

Soprano:

The flow of death is swallowed up,
The law of mercy is bestowed on us!

Children:

Let us praise God!

Soprano:

It is a day of joy,
A light is shed on the yoke of the singers!
A festival is celebrated,
Therefore let us rejoice!

Children:

Glory on high!
Light shines in the darkness!

Soprano:

While ye have light,
believe in the light,
that ye may be the children of light.

== Reception and influence ==
This piece won the 2001 Grammy Award for Best Contemporary Classical Composition. Nonetheless, certain music critics argued that Crumb inserted too many intricate details, perhaps creating too large of an ensemble. They thought that so large an ensemble with so many intricate and different lines causes some detail and delicacy to become lost. However, other critics, such as Harold C. Schonberg, a music critic and journalist for The New York Times, praised Star-Child. The quotation by Schonberg at the beginning of this article, calls out the power, sensitivity, emotion, and complexity of the Star-Child.

== Recordings ==
1. Crumb, George. 70th Birthday Album. (Complete George Crumb Edition, Volume 3) Warsaw Philharmonic Orchestra, Warsaw Philharmonic Choir, Warsaw Boys' Choir, Thomas Conlin (conductor), Susan Narucki (soprano soloist), Joseph Alessi (trombone soloist), George Crumb & Paul Cesarczyk (bell ringers). Bridge Records BCD 9095 (1999). This 1999 recording also released by Bridge Records on George Crumb Orchestral Music (BCD 9174), 2003. Compact disc.
2. Michael Gielen Edition, Vol. 10, Musik nach 1945, Klassiker der Nachkriegsmoderne (SWR Media Services GmbH www.swrmusic.ed; Naxos Deutschland Musik & Video Vertriebs-GmbH; CD-No. SWR19111) CD 2 of this 6-CD set includes a live recording (February 24, 1979) of the German premiere of Star-Child at Schwäbisch-Gmünd, Heilig-Kreuz-Münster (recording first released 2021). Performers: Irene Gubrud (soprano soloist), Armin Rosin (trombone soloist), Christophorus-Kantorei Altensteig, SWR Vokalensemble, Radio-Sinfonieorchester Stuttgart des SWR, Michael Gielen (principal conductor), with assistant conductors Clytus Gottwald, Manfred Schreier, Marinus Voorberg.
3. Crumb, George. Star-Child. Pierre Boulez, conductor; Irene Gubrud, soprano; Edward Herman, Jr., trombone. Released in December 2017 (in the series of New York Philharmonic Historic Broadcasts), this is a live recording of the world premiere performance on May 7, 1977. (Other performers are listed above in the second paragraph of Composition and Premiere.) This recording can be accessed via Youtube music, Spotify, etc.
