= Toy piano =

Musical instrument

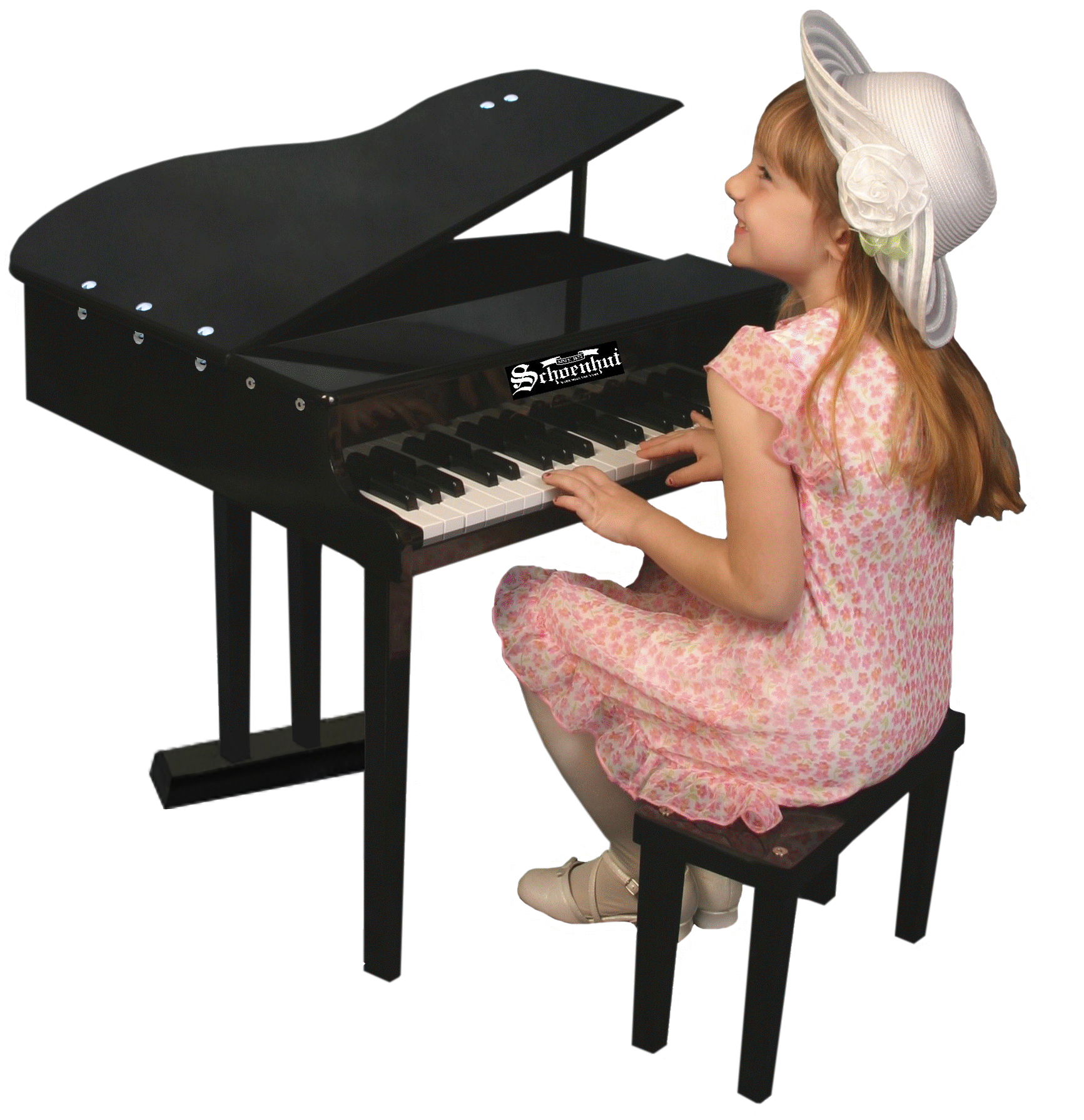
Schoenhut 37-key Concert Grand (F3 to F6)

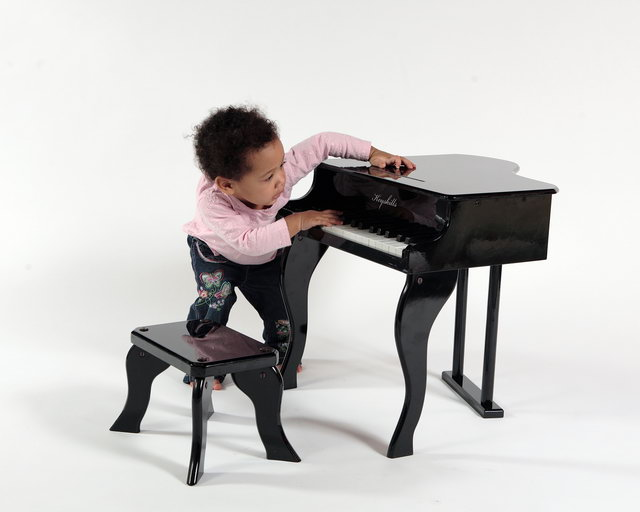
Keyskills 30-key toy piano (C4 to F6)

The toy piano, also known as the kinderklavier (lit. 'children's piano' in German), is a small piano-like musical instrument. Most modern toy pianos use round metal rods, as opposed to strings in a regular piano, to produce sound. The U.S. Library of Congress recognizes the toy piano as a unique instrument with the subject designation, Toy Piano Scores: M175 T69. The most famous example of a dedicated composition for the instrument is the "Suite for Toy Piano" (1948) by John Cage.

== Characteristics ==
Toy pianos come in many shapes, from scale models of upright or grand pianos to toys which only resemble pianos in that they possess keys. Toy pianos are usually no more than 50 cm in width, and made out of wood or plastic. The first toy pianos were made in the mid-19th century and were typically uprights, although many toy pianos made today are models of grands. Rather than hammers hitting strings as on a standard piano, the toy piano sounds by way of hammers hitting metal bars or rods which are fixed at one end. The hammers are connected to the keys by a mechanism similar to that which drives celestas.

"Pop Goes the Weasel"
"Pop Goes the Weasel" performed on a toy piano

Toy pianos ostensibly use the same musical scale as full size pianos, although their tuning in all but the most expensive models is usually very approximate. Similarly, the pitch to which they are tuned is rarely close to the standard of 440 Hz for the A above middle C. A typical toy piano will have a range of one to three octaves. The cheapest models may not have black keys, or the black keys may be painted on. This means they can play a fixed diatonic scale (or an approximately tuned version of it), but not the full chromatic scale, or diatonic scales in other keys. Typically, diatonic toy pianos have only eight keys and can play one octave. Other variants may have non-functioning black keys between every key (which would make it appear to play the quarter tones between E/F and B/C), but they either do not play, play the same notes as an adjacent white key, or play a special sound effect. Some toy pianos cost hundreds of dollars.

== History ==
Early toy pianos used glass bars to produce their sound, but Albert Schoenhut, son of a German toy-making family, introduced metal sounding bars to make the instrument more durable. One popular model used metal xylophone bars, struck by a wooden sphere thrown up by the piano key to make its sound. In 1866 Schoenhut was offered employment in Philadelphia, United States, to repair German toy pianos which had been damaged in transit. In 1872 he established the Schoenhut Piano Company to manufacture toy pianos, diversifying into other instruments. By 1917, Schoenhut produced a catalog showing 10 pages of upright and grand pianos of all shapes and sizes, with one page devoted to miniature piano stools alone. The models had nicknames beginning with "P", such as Packer, Padder, Papa and Poet. Keys were made of imitation ivory. By 1935, Schoenhut had produced over 40 styles and sizes of toy piano, with prices ranging from 50 cents to 25 dollars.

In 1930, a toy piano metal rod design was patented by Alice Violet Bennett.

During the 1950s, J. Chein & Company of Burlington, NJ manufactured the PianoLodeon, a child's piano remarkable for the fact that it operated by a mechanism closely related to an actual player piano. The child could play the keys or let a small piano roll take over, the metal rods being struck by hammers propelled by a vacuum driven by a blower. In the 1960s, the Tomy Toy Company offered the Tuneyville Player Piano using organ music, in which air blows through pipes. The child can play the keys manually or insert a plastic disk to play a recognizable tune.

By the 1950s, the toy piano market was dominated by two main toy piano makers: Jaymar and Schoenhut, counterparts to the Steinway and Baldwin for adult pianos. Wooden keys and hammers were replaced by moulded plastic ones. In the late 1970s, Schoenhut was acquired by Jaymar, although the two retained their distinct identities. Jaymar/Schoenhut experienced difficulty during the recession of the 1980s, folding and eventually re-emerging as the Schoenhut Piano Company in 1997. Today, Schoenhut Piano Company is still the leading manufacturer, with other toy piano manufacturers: Hering from Brazil, Zeada from China, and New Classic Toys from Netherlands.

From 1939 to 1970, Victor Michel improved toy-piano conception. Michelsonne French toy-pianos are known for their uniquely distinctive sound.

Launched in 2000, the annual Toy Piano Festival, held in San Diego at the University of California, San Diego's Geisel Library, features a collection of toy pianos, recordings of compositions, and live performance of existing and new works written for toy pianos. The Festival influenced the Library of Congress to designate, in 2001, a dedicated subject heading and call number, Toy Piano Scores: M175 T69.

== Use in musical performance ==
Though originally made as a child's toy, the toy piano has been used in serious classical and contemporary musical contexts. The most famous example is the "Suite for Toy Piano" (1948) by John Cage. Other works in classical music for the instrument include "Ancient Voices of Children" by George Crumb and a number of pieces by Mauricio Kagel. "Streicher, Tasti et Bizarreries" (2019) by Bijan Olia uses toy piano and melodica in addition to piano quartet. A toy piano is also a distinctive instrument in the opening credits music for Dexter, and in the main motif of the song "Summer Breeze" by Seals and Crofts.

== See also ==
- Lamellophone
- Toy Symphony
