= Michelsonne =

French brand of toy piano, 1939 to 1970

Michelsonne Paris was a French brand of toy piano manufactured from 1939 to 1970, and created by Victor Michel (1904–1983).

They were named "bell-tone pianos" on their publicity brochure. They became very rare to find. In 1970, a fire destroyed their factory at 7 rue Duvergier in Paris 75019, and the patents were sold to Bontempi. Bontempi has continued building the same models for a 4-year-old audience. However, there are a few visual differences. They used black keys and a dark brown body layout.

There are several models:

- chromatic upright pianos with 13, 16, 20, 25, 30, 37 or 49 keys
- chromatic grand pianos with 25, 30, 37 or 49 keys

In France many toy-piano players use Michelsonne pianos because of their beautiful and inimitable sound. Famous professional players include Pascal Comelade and Yann Tiersen.
