= Vox Balaenae =

Chamber work by George Crumb (1971)

- Chamber music by George Crumb
- English: Voice of the Whale
- Composed: 1971
- Duration: ~20 minutes
- Movements: 8
- Scoring: electric flute; electric cello; amplified piano

Vox Balaenae (Voice of the Whale), is a work for electric flute, electric cello and amplified piano by the American avant-garde composer George Crumb. It was composed for performance by the New York Camerata in 1971.

== Background ==
As the name of the piece indicates, Vox Balaenae was inspired by whale songs. "Late in the 1960s, George Crumb heard a tape recording prepared by a marine scientist of the sounds emitted by the humpback whale.... In 1971, Crumb drew on these sounds as the inspiration...". Although the piece has eight movements, these are grouped into three structurally similar parts: the first two movements "(...for the beginning of time)", five variations named after geologic time periods, and the last movement "(...for the end of time)".

== Movements and instrumentation techniques ==
In addition to instrumentation techniques, performers are asked to wear half black masks. It is highly suggested that whenever possible the performance be done under blue lighting. The cello is tuned scordatura, and the piece requires the use of a grand piano as the techniques required would not be possible on an upright model.

Movement	Instrumentation Techniques
Vocalise (for the beginning of time)	Sing flute, performer sings into flute while playing, flutter tonguing (flz), muting piano strings using fingertips, glissandi on piano strings
Sea Theme	Cello harmonics, "Aeolian harp" - performer strums piano strings
Archeozoic [Var. I]	Cello harmonics ("seagull" effect), chisel on piano strings, piano "double- glissando" effect, quarter tone trills
Proterozoic [Var. II]	Paper clip strums piano strings, "speak-flute"
Paleozoic [Var. III]	Harmonic glissandi for cello, cello and flute harmonics
Mesozoic [Var. IV]	Glass rod on piano strings
Cenozoic [Var. V]	Flutter tonguing (flz), sul ponticello, whistling (includes quarter tones),
Sea-Nocturne (for the end of time)	Whistling continues, antique cymbals, flute harmonics, playing in "pantomime" (absolutely silent, mimicking playing)

== Recordings ==
Ensemble	Players
Curtis Institute of Music	Mimi Stillman (Flute), Arlen Hlusko (Cello), Amy Yang (Piano)
Ensemble intercontemporain	Sophie Cherrier (Flute), Pierre Strauch (Cello), Hidéki Nagano (Piano)
Atlanta Chamber Players	Christina Smith (Flute), Brad Ritchie (Cello), Paula Peace (Piano)
Ensemble ACJW	Catherine Gregory (Flute), Alice Yoo (Cello), Tyler Wottrich (Piano)
