= Ann Crumb =

American actress and singer (1950–2019)

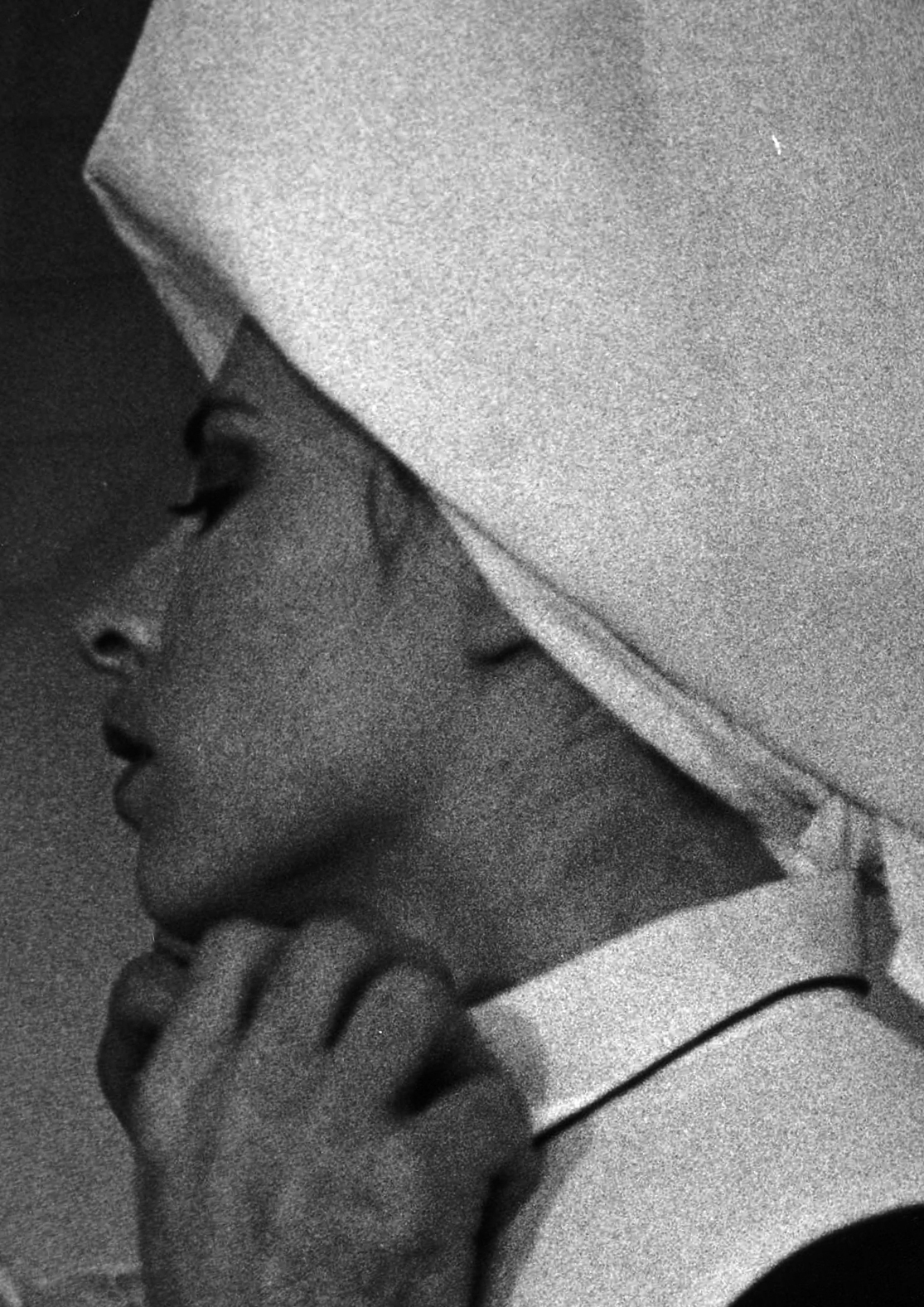
- Ann Crumb in a scene from Witkacy's The Madman and the Nun (ca. 1979)

Background information
- Born: Elizabeth Ann Crumb; May 25, 1950; Charleston, West Virginia, U.S.
- Died: October 31, 2019 (aged 69) Media, Pennsylvania, U.S.
- Occupations: Actress, singer
- Instrument: Vocals (soprano)
- Years active: 1987–2019

Elizabeth Ann Crumb (May 25, 1950 – October 31, 2019) was an American actress and singer.

== Career ==
Crumb was born in Charleston, West Virginia and raised in Media, Pennsylvania. She was the daughter of composer George Crumb and pianist Elizabeth Crumb, and the sister of composer David Crumb. She graduated with both bachelors and masters degrees from the University of Michigan.

Crumb began her stage career in Philadelphia in the mid 1970s, and remained intermittently active in Philadelphia theaters throughout her career. She studied singing in that city with Bill Schuman; a faculty member of the Academy of Vocal Arts. Her first play was Harold Pinter's The Birthday Party. She abandoned plans for a career in medicine after being cast in the national tour of El Grande de Coca-Cola . She made her Broadway debut in 1987 as a member of the original cast of Les Misérables. Her other Broadway credits include Chess, Anna Karenina, for which she was nominated for the Tony Award for Best Actress in a Musical in 1993, and Aspects of Love, as Rose Vibert, a role she originated in the West End.

Crumb toured in the title role of Evita and appeared in numerous regional theatre productions staged by the Guthrie, Coconut Grove Playhouse, and Tennessee Repertory Theatre, among others. Her television credits include the daytime soaps As the World Turns, The Guiding Light, and Another World, and the primetime dramas Law & Order and Law & Order: Criminal Intent. She was in pre-production for a mini-series entitled The Road to Saint Lazarre in which she was to portray famed spy Mata Hari.

Crumb's recordings include A Broadway Diva Swings, a concert version of Nine with Jonathan Pryce and Elaine Paige, and Unto the Hills, in collaboration with her father.

== Personal life ==
Crumb was committed to the cause of animal rescue and adoption. In December, 2009, she co-ordinated a “doglift” of over 50 dogs, all slated for euthanasia at shelters in the Midwest to no-kill rescues in the Northeast where homes could be found for them. Crumb was born in Charleston, West Virginia.

Crumb died on October 31, 2019, at her parents' home in Media, Pennsylvania from ovarian cancer, aged 69.
