= Jan DeGaetani =

American opera singer

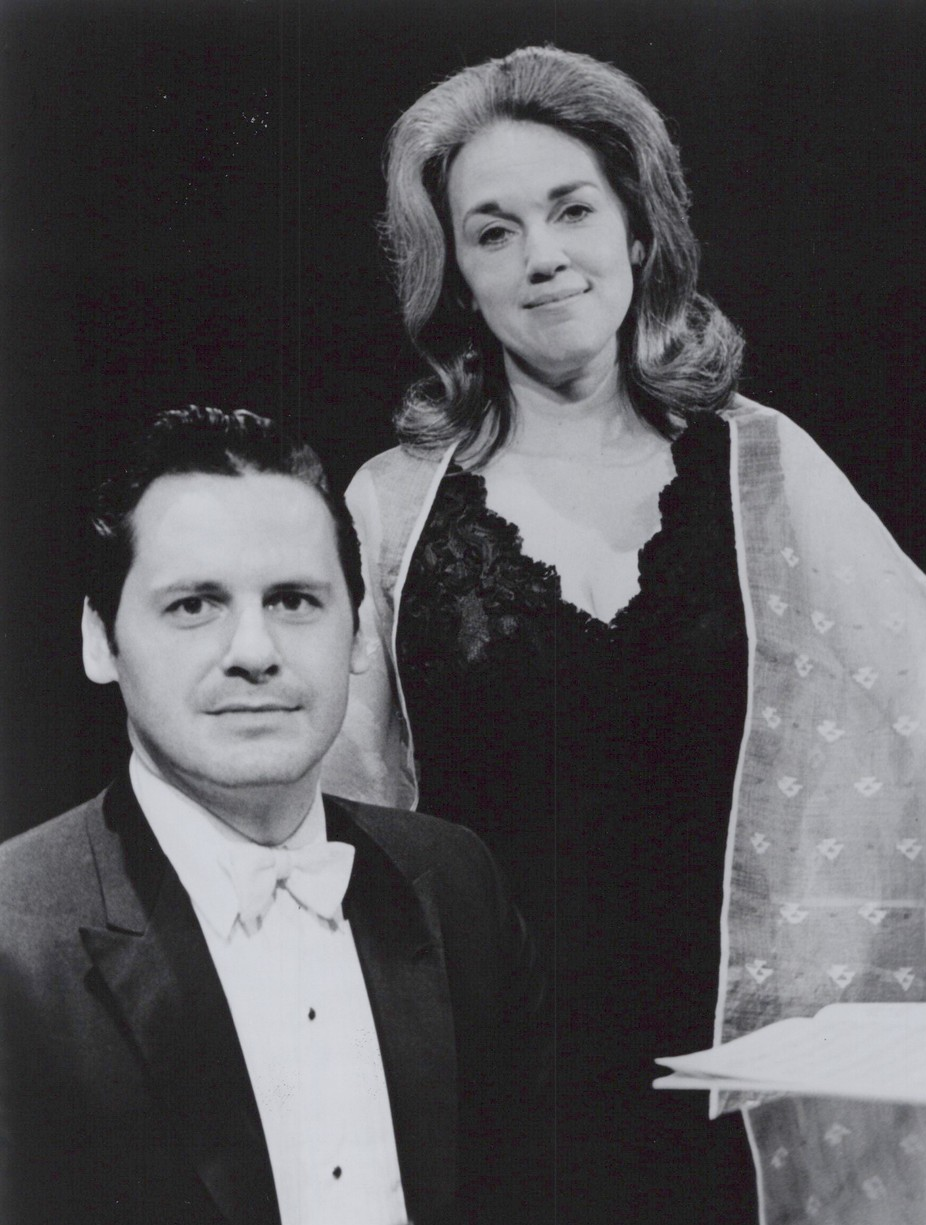
DeGaetani and Lawrence Leighton Smith in 1970

Jan (Janice) DeGaetani (July 10, 1933 – September 15, 1989) was an American mezzo-soprano known for her performances of contemporary classical vocal compositions.

DeGaetani was born in Massillon, Ohio. Educated at The Juilliard School with Sergius Kagen, she was best known for her wide range, precise pitch, clear tone, and command of extended techniques that made her voice perfectly suited to the demanding style of modern and avant-garde vocal composition. Her recording of Schoenberg's song cycle Pierrot lunaire is one of the classic recordings of the piece. (Due to its use of atonality, wide range, and virtuoso techniques such as sprechstimme, all while requiring a lyrical sensibility, it is exceptionally difficult to sing.) Her collaboration with George Crumb was also a fruitful one; she premiered his song cycle Ancient Voices of Children, and many of his other works were written for her. Uncommonly for a singer of her caliber (though her voice was not as powerful as most), DeGaetani rarely appeared in opera, instead concentrating on solo recital work in the art song literature.

Her talent at foreign languages also made her an accomplished interpreter of lieder; she sang and recorded works by composers such as Hugo Wolf, Hector Berlioz, and Gustav Mahler and was noted for her intelligence and skillful analytical interpretation. Her interpretive skills also lent themselves to songs in her native tongue of English, such as Aaron Copland's 12 Poems of Emily Dickinson, and the songs of Charles Ives. On the other end of the spectrum, DeGaetani was also a noted performer of the medieval and Renaissance repertoire.

DeGaetani made her New York performance debut in 1958. Afterward, she performed with the Contemporary Chamber Ensemble regularly, and also appeared with several world-famous orchestras, including the New York Philharmonic, the Philadelphia Orchestra, the Berlin Philharmonic, the BBC Symphony, and the Chicago Symphony, and made numerous recordings with them and in chamber ensembles. She was professor of voice at Eastman School of Music and Artist in Residence at the Aspen Music Festival from 1973 until her death. Notable students include American sopranos Dawn Upshaw, Karen Holvik, Renée Fleming, and Lucy Shelton, mezzo-sopranos Milagro Vargas and Mary Nessinger, tenor Stephen Oosting, and baritone William Sharp.

DeGaetani died in Rochester, New York, in 1989, aged 56, of leukemia.

== Discography ==
- Songs From a Colonial Tavern as sung by Taylor Vrooman also with Marvin Hayes, Bass (1964)
- Pierrot Lunaire by Schoenberg (1971)
- Songs by Stephen Foster, with Leslie Guinn (1972)
- Las Cantigas de Santa Maria - Songs and Instrumental Music from the Court of Alfonso X, with the Waverly Consort, Michael Jaffee, dir. (1972)
- Songs from the Spanisches Liederbuch by Hugo Wolf (1974)
- Songs by Schubert / The Book of the Hanging Gardens, Op. 15 by Schoenberg (1975)
- Ancient Voices of Children by George Crumb (1975)
- Songs by Charles Ives (1976)
- Songs by Stephen Foster, Volume II with Leslie Guinn (1976)
- Classic Cole songs by Cole Porter, with Leo Smit, piano (1977)
- Chansons Madécasses by Ravel (1978)
- String Quartet #6 - A Whitman Serenade by Samuel Adler (1979)
- Songs by Sergei Rachmaninoff & Ernest Chausson (1980)
- Duets & Four Songs from Op. 98a by Robert Schumann, with Leslie Guinn (1983)
- Apparition by George Crumb / Songs by Charles Ives (1983)
- Songs by Brahms (1983)
- Moore's Irish Melodies (1984)
- Chansons de Bilitis and Fêtes Galantes by Debussy / Histoires Naturelles by Ravel (1984)
- The Nursery Cycle by Mussorgsky / Songs by Tchaikovsky (1985)
- Lullabies and Night Songs by Alec Wilder (1985)
- George Crumb: An Idyll for the Misbegotten/Vox Balaenae/Madrigals (Books I-IV) by George Crumb (1987)
- Songs of America on Home, Love, Nature, and Death - various composers (1988)
- Les Nuits d'été by Berlioz with Five Wunderhorn Songs & Five Rückert Songs by Mahler (1989)
- Jan DeGaetani in Concert, Volume One: La Chanson d'Eve by Gabriel Fauré / Dark upon the Harp by Jacob Druckman (1991)
- Jan DeGaetani in Concert, Volume Two: Frauenliebe und -leben by Schumann / Zigeunerlieder and other songs by Brahms (1991)
- Aaron Copland 81st Birthday Concert at the Library of Congress with Leo Smit (1993)
- Jan DeGaetani in Concert, Volume Three: Shostakovich, Welcher, Kurtág (1995)
- Jan DeGaetani in Concert, Volume Four: Early Music Recital by various composers (1999)
- Jan DeGaetani/Gilbert Kalish In Concert: Recital Performances from 1987 by various composers (2011)
