= David Burge =

American pianist, conductor, and composer (1930–2013)

David Russell Burge (March 25, 1930 – April 1, 2013) was an American pianist, conductor and composer. As a performer, he was noted for championing contemporary pieces. The New York Times called him "one of America's important pianists," and his concerts were described as "an overwhelming experience" (Washington Post) presenting "masterful artistry" (Baltimore Sun).

== Biography ==
Burge was born in Evanston, Illinois. He studied at Northwestern University for his bachelor's and master's degrees. Later he attained the Doctor of Musical Arts degree and an artist's diploma from the Eastman School of Music, and he studied at the Cherubini Conservatory, Florence as a Fulbright scholar.

While on the faculty at the University of Colorado in Boulder during the 1960s and 1970s, Burge founded and directed the Colorado Festival of Contemporary Music, and he was also musical director and conductor of the Boulder Philharmonic Orchestra.

During that period, George Crumb collaborated with Burge while writing Makrokosmos, a series of four volumes of pieces for piano. Makrokosmos, Volume I was composed in 1972 for Burge, who had previously commissioned and premiered Crumb's Five Pieces for Piano (1962). The Nonesuch recording of Makrokosmos, Vol. I was nominated for a Grammy. Burge also worked with composers such as Ernst Krenek, Luciano Berio, and Karlheinz Stockhausen, and singers including Cathy Berberian and Bethany Beardslee.

After leaving the University of Colorado, he chaired the Piano Department at the Eastman School of Music for many years. Over his career, he gave more than 1,000 concerts in the United States, Europe, Asia, Australia and New Zealand, composed more than 100 works, authored the book Twentieth-Century Piano Music (Shirmer Books, 1990), wrote prize-winning columns for Keyboard Magazine, Clavier and The Piano Quarterly.

In 1993, Burge moved to San Diego with his wife, Liliane Choney, and served as composer-in-residence for the San Diego Ballet. His ballet scores became increasingly well known outside the San Diego area, with over thirty performances in the United States and abroad.

In early 2002, Burge and Crumb were appointed to a joint residency at Arizona State University. He accepted visiting professorships not only at many universities and conservatories in the United States but also in Denmark, Turkey, New Zealand, Canada, Australia, Sweden, and Korea.

Burge died from a heart attack on April 1, 2013, in Warwick, Rhode Island.

== Bibliography ==
- Twentieth Century Piano Music (1994); ISBN 0-8108-4966-6; Scarecrow Press
- Timeless Relevance: The Keyboard Magazine Columns, 1975-1989 (ed. Evon Burge, 2018); ISBN 978-1-926570-11-2; Chelsea Books
