= Echoes of Time and the River =

Orchestral suite by George Crumb

- Orchestral suite by George Crumb
- Occasion: 75th anniversary of the University of Chicago
- Performed: May 26, 1967: Mandel Hall, Chicago
- Movements: 4
- Pulitzer Prize for Music 1968

Echoes of Time and the River (Echoes II) is an orchestral suite by the American composer George Crumb. It was commissioned by the University of Chicago to commemorate the university's 75th anniversary. The piece was first performed by the Chicago Symphony Orchestra conducted by Irwin Hoffman at the University of Chicago's Mandel Hall on May 26, 1967. The piece was awarded the 1968 Pulitzer Prize for Music.

== Structure ==
Echoes of Time and the River has a duration of approximately 18 minutes and is cast in four movements:

1. Frozen Time
2. Remembrance of Time
3. Collapse of Time
4. Last Echoes of Time

== Instrumentation ==
The work is scored for a large orchestra consisting of three flutes (doubling piccolo), three clarinets (doubling E♭ clarinet), three horns, three trumpets, three trombones, timpani, six percussionists, two pianos (doubling celesta), mandolin, harp, and strings.
