= A Little Suite for Christmas, A.D. 1979 =

1980 piano composition by George Crumb

- Piano music by George Crumb
- Composed: 1980
- Movements: 7

A Little Suite for Christmas, A.D. 1979 is a composition for piano, written by American composer George Crumb, written in 1980. The suite is conceptually related to the Nativity frescoes of the Arena Chapel in Padua, Italy. This private chapel, painted by Giotto (finished in 1305), traces, through a series of separate panels, the lineage and conception of Jesus Christ, incidents in his life and his crucifixion and resurrection.

== Parts ==
1. The Visitation
2. Berceuse for the Infant Jesu
3. The Shepherd's Noël
4. Adoration of the Magi
5. Nativity Dance
6. Canticle of the Holy Night
7. Carol of the Bells
