= Black Angels (Crumb) =

Composition for string quartet

- Thirteen Images from the Dark Land
- Threnody by George Crumb
- Composed: 1970
- Published: 1971
- Movements: 3 groups
- Scoring: electric string quartet; crystal glasses; suspended tam-tam gongs

Black Angels, subtitled "Thirteen Images from the Dark Land", is a work for "electric string quartet" by the American avant-garde composer George Crumb. It was composed over the course of a year and is dated "Friday the Thirteenth, March 1970 (in tempore belli)" as written on the score. The Latin phrase in tempore belli, in time of war, written into the score by Crumb is a reference to the Vietnam War taking place at the time when Black Angels was composed.

Crumb numerically structured the piece around 13 and 7, as numbers traditionally related to fate and destiny. The piece is notable for its unconventional instrumentation, which calls for electric string instruments, crystal glasses, and two tam-tams. The work quotes a portion of the second movement, Andante con moto, from Schubert's String Quartet No. 14.

== Background ==
The work, as a threnody, is written as an ode or lament for the progress of the Vietnam War. According to Robert Greenberg, the opening threnody is symbolic of the attack helicopters used predominantly by American forces during the war. According to Greenberg, 'Electric Insects' was the preferred euphemism which Crumb used to describe the attack helicopters, being symbolically referenced by the music being played contra-tonally by high pitched violins to a rapid tempo.

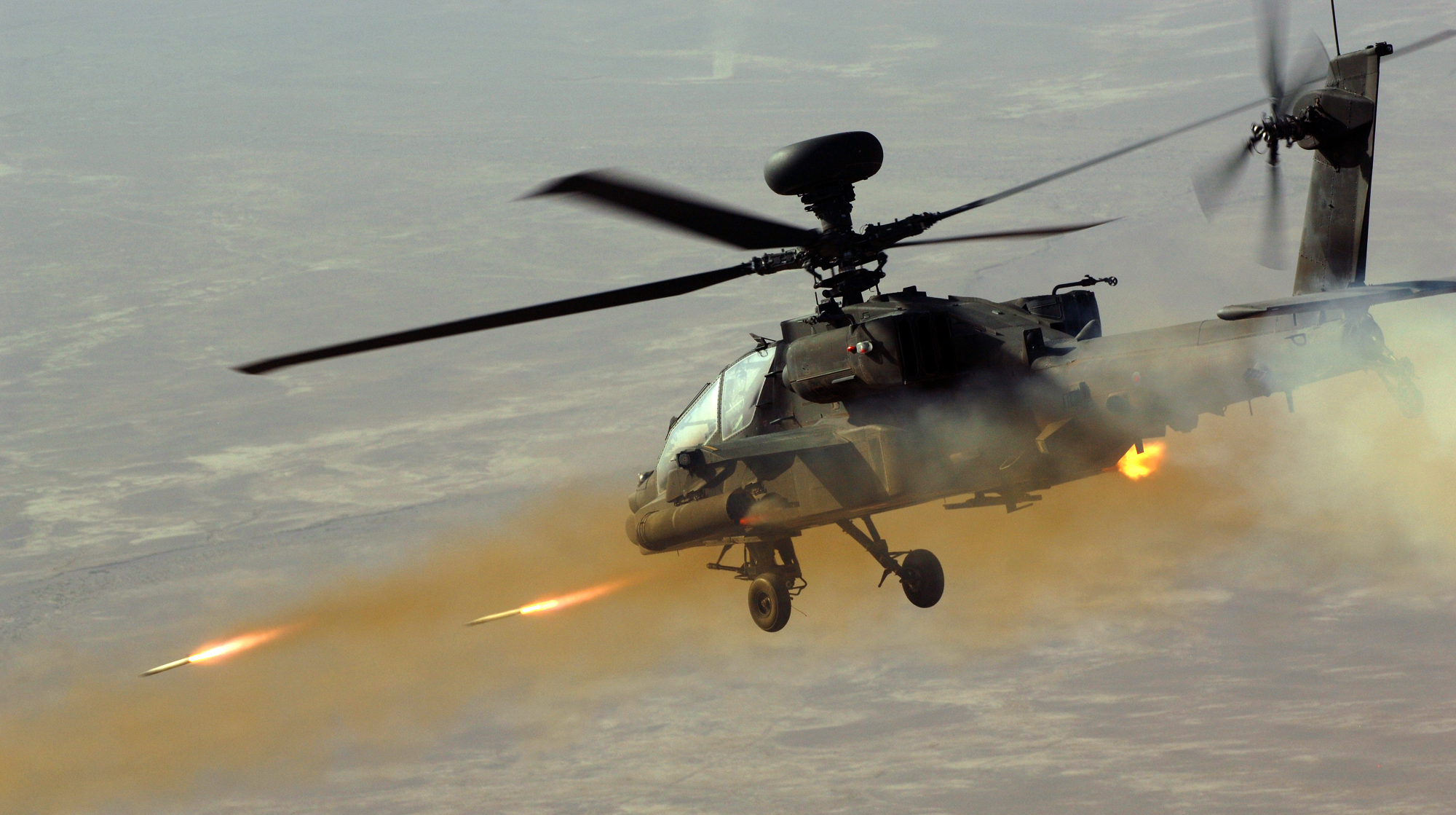
Robert Greenberg has interpreted the "Electric Insects" symbolized by Crumb in Black Angels as representing attack helicopters in military deployment during the Vietnam War.

Crumb has indicated that the composition "was commissioned by the University of Michigan and first performed by the Stanley Quartet. For the composition, Crumb used several quotations from previous composers, most notably Franz Schubert. As Crumb states, "There are several allusions to tonal music in Black Angels: a quotation from Schubert's "Death and the Maiden" quartet (in the Pavana Lachrymae and also faintly echoed on the last page of the work); an original Sarabanda, which is stylistically synthetic; the sustained B major tonality of God-Music; and several references to the Latin sequence Dies Irae ("Day of Wrath"). The work abounds in conventional musical symbolisms such as the Diabolus in Musica (the interval of the tritone) and the Trillo Di Diavolo (the "Devil's trill", after Tartini).

As a general summary of the musical composition, Crumb has stated that, "Black Angels (Thirteen Images from the Dark Land) was conceived as a kind of parable on our troubled contemporary world. The numerous quasi-programmatic allusions in the work are therefore symbolic, although the essential polarity – God versus Devil – implied more than a purely metaphysical reality. The image of the "black angel" was a conventional device used by early painters to symbolize the fallen angel.

== Movements ==
The thirteen individual movements of Black Angels are divided into three large groups.

1. Departure

1. Threnody I: Night of the Electric Insects (tutti)
2. Sounds of Bones and Flutes (trio)
3. Lost Bells (duo)
4. Devil-music (solo)
5. Danse Macabre (duo)

2. Absence

6. Pavana Lachrymae (trio)
7. Threnody II: Black Angels! (tutti)
8. Sarabanda de la Muerte Oscura (trio)
9. Lost Bells (Echo) (duo)

3. Return

10. God-music (solo)
11. Ancient Voices (duo)
12. Ancient Voices (Echo) (trio)
13. Threnody III: Night of the Electric Insects (tutti)

== Structure ==
Crumb has stated that, "The underlying structure of Black Angels is a huge arch-like design which is suspended from the three 'Threnody' pieces. The work portrays a voyage of the soul. The three stages of this voyage are Departure (fall from grace), Absence (spiritual annihilation) and Return (redemption).

Victoria Adamenko has tried to elaborate what Crumb has called "the numerological basis of the entire work," as related to the "axis of symmetry" associated with "7" as the precise halfway point between the integer counting sequence from 1 to 13. As Adamenko states, "The puzzling subtitle for this movement combines the numbers 7 and 13 in a repetitive manner: '7 times 7 and 13 times 13.' The movement opens with a tritone in each of the parts repeated 7 times. In the context hinted at by the subtitle, the tritone is apparently represented by the number 7. The formula '13 time 13' applies to the number of utterances of the word 'thirteen' pronounced in different languages – namely, it appears 3 times uttered by 3 performers (total 9 utterances) on page 5 of the score, and one time at the end of the movement by all four participants (9 + 4 = 13). This centerpiece is framed by two movements that also contain uniform numbers instead of juxtaposing them: '13 over 13' in the Sarabanda and '13 under 13' in the Pavana".

The structure of the work displays the numerological elements important to Crumb, that is, thirteen movements, of which the seventh is the centerpiece. Further, the organization of movements displays symmetry and palindrome: the instrumentation of each movement follows a palindromic structure: 4, 3, 2, 1, 2, 3, 4, 3, 2, 1, 2, 3, 4; the first, central and thirteenth movements are titled Threnody; God-music and Devil-music stand symmetrically opposite each other.

Regarding the numerological symbolism in the composition, Crumb has stated, "The numerological symbolism of Black Angels, while perhaps not immediately perceptible to the ear, is nonetheless quite faithfully reflected in the musical structure. These "magical" relationships are variously expressed; e.g., in terms of phrase length, grouping of single tones, durations, patterns of repetition, etc. An important pitch element in the work—descending E, A, D-sharp—also symbolizes the fateful numbers 7–13. At certain points in the score there occurs a kind of ritualistic counting in various languages, including German, French, Russian, Hungarian, Japanese and Swahili.

== Instrumentation ==
Black Angels is primarily written for (in Crumb's words) "electric string quartet". Though generally played by amplified acoustic instruments, the work is occasionally performed on specially constructed electronic string instruments. The music uses the extremes of the instruments' registers as well as extended techniques such as bowing on the fingerboard above the fingers and tapping the strings with thimbles. At certain points in the music, the players are required to make sounds with their mouths and to speak.

Crumb has stated that, "The amplification of the stringed instruments in Black Angels is intended to produce a highly surrealistic effect. This surrealism is heightened by the use of unusual string effects; e.g. pedal tones (the intensely obscene sounds of the Devil-Music); bowing on the "wrong" side of the strings (to produce the viol-consort effect); trilling on the strings with thimble-capped fingers. The performers also play maracas, tam-tams and water-tuned crystal goblets, the latter played with the bow for the "glass harmonica" effect in God-Music.

Regarding the stage positioning of the instruments during performance, Crumb's score includes a diagram that places the four musicians in a box-like formation. Electric violin II and Electric cello are located near upstage right and upstage left, respectively, with their tam-tams between them. Electric violin I and Electric viola are near downstage right and downstage left, respectively, but are slightly farther apart than the other two musicians in order to allow full sight of the quartet. Violin I, violin II and viola have a set of crystal glasses downstage of them, while violin I and cello have maracas upstage of them. Each of the four musicians has a speaker next to him or her.

Each of the string players is also assigned a set of instruments to play throughout the piece. Some of the equipment requires specific preparation, such as the crystal glasses, which are tuned with different amounts of water.

Violin 1

- maraca
- 7 crystal glasses
- 6" glass rod
- 2 metal thimbles
- metal pick (paper clip)

Violin 2

- 15" suspended tam-tam and mallet
- contrabass bow (for use on tam-tam)
- 7 crystal glasses
- 6" glass rod
- 2 metal thimbles
- metal pick (paper clip)

Viola

- 6 crystal glasses
- 6" glass rod
- 2 metal thimbles
- metal pick

Cello

- maraca
- 24" suspended tam-tam, soft and hard mallets
- contrabass bow

== Reception ==
Uta Schwiemann, writing for Teldec, has stated about the composition:

"Crumb deeply venerates the Spanish writer García Lorca and has set many of his texts to music. The spiritual aspect of his music is particularly striking. His close identification with music of earlier periods is especially pronounced in his latest works, in which he reverts to traditional forms. In this process musical quotations, modified by Crumb's specific style, have a particular significance. Among the quotations in Black Angels is the theme of the second movement of Schubert's 'Death and the Maiden" Quartet, to which he gives an entirely new character. The absence of the third makes it reminiscent of a mediaeval sequence. Combined with an acoustically contrived impression of distance, this passage acquires an ethereal quality, with the redemption chorale referred to above fading away into nothingness. Total desolation comes to the fore, reinforced by a reminiscence of the "Night of the Electric Insects" on the first violin."

== Popular culture ==
A recording of Black Angels by the New York String Quartet (CRI) was mentioned by David Bowie as among his 25 favorite records in 2003. The Kronos Quartet was originally formed in 1973 after violinist David Harrington heard "Black Angels" over the radio. He thought Crumb's piece was "something wild, something scary" and "absolutely the right music to play". It was among the first compositions Kronos performed on stage. The Kronos Quartet eventually recorded the work on their 1990 album Black Angels. "Threnody I: Night of the Electric Insects" is featured on the soundtrack of The Exorcist, and "III. Return – God-music" is heard in the television series Cosmos: A Personal Voyage on the third episode of the series titled "The Harmony of the Worlds".

Author Elizabeth Hand drew many of the chapter titles for her dark fantasy novel Waking the Moon from the composition, and credits it in the "Coda" of the book
