= J. Chein & Company =

American Toy Company

J. Chein & Company was an American toy manufacturer in business from 1903 through the 1980s. It is best remembered today for its mechanical toys made from stamped and lithographed tin produced from the 1930s through the 1950s.

Founded by Julius Chein in a loft in New York City, Chein's earliest toy production was a line of premiums for the Cracker Jacks snack line. The American Can Company provided the lithographic printing for Chein's early output until 1907 when Chein opened their own full production plant in Harrison, New Jersey. With their new facilities, they were able to produce piggy banks, noisemakers and model horse-drawn carriages. They also manufactured a number of toys under license from such companies as King Features Syndicate and Walt Disney Productions, producing Popeye, Felix the Cat and various Disney character toys.

In the 1920s and early-1930s, Chein produced a popular line of toy trucks under the "Hercules" name, rather than their own name. They heavily exploited the toy vehicle market with a wide range of toy boats and wheeled vehicles. They also produced many noisemakers such as tambourines and rattles. Walking, crawling or jumping figural wind-up toys became a mainstay; their coin banks were also consistently popular.

In 1926, Julius Chein was killed in a horse-riding accident in Central Park. Control of the company passed to Chein's widow who then turned the management of it over to her brother, Samuel Hoffman, who was already the founder and CEO of the rival Mohawk Toy Company. Under Hoffman's direction, J. Chein & Company expanded and prospered, producing many increasingly complicated mechanical toys. They had particular success with circus and amusement park-themed toys such as roller coasters, Ferris wheels and carousels. These toys command high interest from collectors today and are considered prime examples from the "golden age of toys".

During World War II, J. Chein & Company suspended toy production, instead producing nosecones and tail units for bombs and casings for incendiary devices. After the War, Chein returned to toy production with considerable success. However, as the 1940s drew to a close, they encountered increasing competition from Japanese manufacturers who produced mechanical tin toys for lower prices.

To become more competitive, Chein moved to a 75,000-square-foot (7,000 m^{2}) factory in Burlington, New Jersey, where they employed a staff of as many as 600 workers. Their primary retailer was F. W. Woolworth Company. While this provided Chein with a steady demand and often healthy cashflow, it also meant that Woolworth's changing fortunes heavily affected them. In the late-1950s and early-1960s, as Woolworth's began to offer more inexpensive plastic toys, Chein was faced with the dilemma of competing with plastic toys that could not only be produced more cheaply, but could more easily incorporate electronics.

In the mid-1960s, Hoffman retired. Soon thereafter, the United States Government began to regulate the toy industry, in particular, the dangers posed by the sharp edges of metal toys. Stamped metal toy manufacturers were required to comply with federal regulations. Consequently, most U.S. tin toy manufacturers abandoned the material in favor of more easily compliant plastic and soft materials. Chein's management did not believe that plastic toys were as durable as metal toys, and the cost of retooling their tin toys to meet federal regulations was cost-prohibitive, so they phased out their tin toy manufacturing and diversified into other markets. Chein acquired the Learning Aids Group and its lines of educational materials, as well as its Renwal Plastics division. Renwal produced the successful series of anatomical kits that included "The Visible Man", "Visible Woman", "Visible Head" and "Visible Dog" models, as well as scale model vehicle kits.

One of the original Chein In the mid-1935 toy products, and one of its most complicated, was the electromechanical "Piano Lodeon", a child-sized player piano. It utilized a combination of plastic and tin, and a mechanism that used spooled rolls of punched paper with well-known songs programmed onto them. A total of approximately 50 tunes were available. The piano's keyboard was actuated by a vacuum produced by an electric fan, with a rubber tube connecting each key with a corresponding hole in the front of the piano's housing. When a hole punched in the paper passed over one of these holes, it caused the correct key to strike tuned tines inside the case, producing the desired tune. The keyboard could also be played manually. The device was never financially successful for Chein due to its complexity, high price and the rise to dominance of purely electronic musical instruments.

In the late-1960s, Chein entered into a licensing agreement to produce "Peanuts" characters, which continued through the early-1970s. In the mid-1970s, Chein sold its Renwal division and focused upon manufacturing lithographed sheet steel housewares such as kitchen canister sets and wastebaskets, under the brand Cheinco. They also produced licensed metal containers for food brands such as Heinz, Sunkist and Maxwell House. In 1979, toy manufacturing was phased out entirely. In the late-1980s, Cheinco was sold to the Atlantic Can Company, who then changed its name to Atlantic Cheinco Corporation. The company was beset with manufacturing problems resulting from environmental issues which in 1992 resulted in them filing for bankruptcy protection. Atlantic Cheinco's assets were then purchased by Ellisco of Pennsylvania, which was a division of CSS Industries. In 1994, CSS then sold Ellisco to the Baltimore-based U.S. Can Company, who continue to produce stamped metal products.
