= David Crumb =

American contemporary composer

David Crumb (born May 21, 1962) is an American contemporary composer born into a musical family. His father was composer George Crumb, and his sister was singer Ann Crumb. His music is not as avant-garde or experimental as his father's; it has been called "attractive, accessible, imaginative, well-crafted" by the Chicago-Sun Times, and "expressive and beautiful" by the American Record Guide: reviews listed on the Presser bio.

== Life ==
Crumb received his B.M. from the Eastman School, and his M.A. and Ph.D. from the University of Pennsylvania. His most prominent composition teachers were Samuel Adler, Richard Wernick, Chinary Ung, Stephen Jaffe, Jay Reise, Mark Kopytman, Lukas Foss and Oliver Knussen.

He is professor of composition at the University of Oregon (on faculty since 1997).

Crumb has received numerous awards.

== Selected works ==
- Kinetikus for large percussion ensemble (2009)
- Hearing Bells for soprano, flute, oboe, cello, percussion and piano (2004–2005)
- Improvisations on an English Folk Tune for flute, clarinet, violin, cello and piano (2004)
- Suspended Blue for brass quintet (2003)
- Primordial Fantasy for piano and chamber ensemble (2002)
- September Elegy for violin and piano (2001)
- Harmonia Mundi for 2 pianos and 2 percussion (2001)
- Variation on "Round Midnight" for solo piano (2001)
- Awakening for trumpet and percussion (2001)
- The Whisperer for 2 pianos and 2 percussion (1999)
- Piano Quartet for piano, violin, viola and cello (1999)
- Vestiges of a Distant Time for orchestra (1996, revised 2003)
- Soundings for clarinet, bassoon and piano (1994)
- Variations for cello and chamber ensemble (1993)
- Clarino for orchestra (1991, revised 1993, 1996)
- Joyce Songs for mezzo-soprano, flute, clarinet and cello (1990, revised 1996)
- Miniatures for clarinet (1989)
- Piano Sonata (1988)
- Metamorphosis for violin, cello, harp, 2 percussion, piano and celesta (1987)
- Movement for string quartet (1985)

== Reviews and discussions ==
- List of Reviews on a University of Oregon Webpage
- Comparison of George and David Crumb
- Review of the Cello Variations
