= List of music students by teacher =

For lists of music students by teacher, see:

- List of music students by teacher: A to B
- List of music students by teacher: C to F
- List of music students by teacher: G to J
- List of music students by teacher: K to M
- List of music students by teacher: N to Q
- List of music students by teacher: R to S
- List of music students by teacher: T to Z
