= Makrokosmos =

Pieces for piano by George Crumb

- Piano music by George Crumb
- Composed: 1972–1979
- Performed: June 12, 1980: Buffalo, New York
- Movements: 4 volumes

Makrokosmos is a series of four volumes of pieces for piano by American composer George Crumb. The name alludes to Mikrokosmos, a set of piano pieces by Béla Bartók, one of Crumb's favorite 20th-century composers. The first volume of the set was composed in 1972, while the last was completed in early 1979; the first performance of all four volumes in sequence was given by Yvar Mikhashoff, Aki Takahashi, Stephen Manes, Freida Manes, Jan Williams and Lynn Harbold, in Buffalo, New York, on 12 June 1980.

== Volume I ==
Makrokosmos, Volume I was composed in 1972 for pianist and friend David Burge (who previously commissioned and premiered Crumb's Five Pieces for Piano (1962)). The collection is subtitled Twelve Fantasy-Pieces after the Zodiac and is scored for amplified piano. Its contents are as follows:

- Part 1:
1. Primeval Sounds (Genesis I) (Cancer)
2. Proteus (Pisces)
3. Pastorale (from the Kingdom of Atlantis, ca. 10,000 B.C.) (Taurus)
4. Crucifixus [SYMBOL] (Capricorn)
- Part 2:
5. The Phantom Gondolier (Scorpio)
6. Night-Spell I (Sagittarius)
7. Music of Shadows (for Aeolian Harp) (Libra)
8. The Magic Circle of Infinity (Moto Perpetuo) [SYMBOL] (Leo)
- Part 3:
9. The Abyss of Time (Virgo)
10. Spring-Fire (Aries)
11. Dream Images (Love-Death Music) (Gemini)
12. Spiral Galaxy [SYMBOL] (Aquarius)

The last piece of each part is notated in such a way that the score forms an image: a cross (piece 4), a circle (piece 8), and a spiral (piece 12). Burge premiered Volume I at Colorado College, Colorado Springs, on 8 February 1973.

== Volume II ==
The second volume of Makrokosmos was completed in 1973. It largely follows the organizational scheme of the first volume, bears the same subtitle (i.e. Twelve Fantasy-Pieces after the Zodiac) and is also scored for amplified piano. Crumb has stated that the two volumes form a sequence of 24 fantasy-pieces. Volume II comprises the following works:

- Part 1:
1. Morning Music (Genesis II) (Cancer)
2. The Mystic Chord (Sagittarius)
3. Rain-Death Variations (Pisces)
4. Twin Suns (Doppelgänger aus der Ewigkeit) [SYMBOL] (Gemini)
- Part 2:
5. Ghost-Nocturne: for the Druids of Stonehenge (Night-Spell II) (Virgo)
6. Gargoyles (Taurus)
7. Tora! Tora! Tora! (Cadenza Apocalittica) (Scorpio)
8. A Prophecy of Nostradamus [SYMBOL] (Aries)
- Part 3:
9. Cosmic wind (Libra)
10. Voices from "Corona Borealis" (Aquarius)
11. Litany of the Galactic Bells (Leo)
12. Agnus Dei [SYMBOL] (Capricorn)

Similarly to Volume I, the last piece of each part is notated so that the score forms an image: two circles (piece 4), a cowrie-like shape (piece 8), and the peace sign (piece 12). The collection was premiered by Robert Miller at the Alice Tully Hall, New York City, on 12 November 1974.

== Volume III ==
A collection of five pieces completed in 1974 and titled Music for a Summer Evening forms the third volume of Makrokosmos. It departs considerably from the previous two. Commissioned by the Fromm Music Foundation for Swarthmore College, the work is scored for two amplified pianos and percussion (two players), contains fewer pieces, and does not associate any of the pieces with Zodiac signs. The contents are as follows:

1. Nocturnal Sounds (The Awakening)
2. Wanderer-Fantasy
3. The Advent (including Hymn for the Nativity of the Star-Child)
4. Myth
5. Music of the Starry Night

Three of the pieces bear an epigraph: piece 1 from Salvatore Quasimodo's poem Ulysses' Isle, piece 3 from Pascal, and piece 5 from Rilke. Music for a Summer Evening was premiered by Gilbert Kalish and James Freeman (piano), Raymond DesRoches and Richard Fitz (percussion) at Swarthmore College, Pennsylvania, on 30 March 1974.

John Keillor has written, “It is a work so successful and openhearted that Makrokosmos III is among the most frequently performed avant-garde chamber works from the second half of the twentieth century.”

== Volume IV ==
The collection that forms the fourth instance of Makrokosmos is titled Celestial Mechanics, and subtitled Cosmic Dances for Amplified Piano, Four Hands. It was completed in April 1979. The pieces are all named after stars

1. Alpha Centauri
2. Beta Cygni
3. Gamma Draconis
4. Delta Orionis

The cycle was premiered by Gilbert Kalish and Paul Jacobs at the Alice Tully Hall, New York City, on 18 November 1979.

== Recordings ==
- Parts I-III: Yoshiko Shimizu (piano), Rupert Struber (percussion), KAIROS (record label), 2018
- Parts I-II : Stéphanos Thomopoulos (piano), Printemps des Arts de Monte Carlo (record label), http://printempsdesarts.com/fr/collection-cd, 2018
