= George Crumb =

American composer (1929–2022)

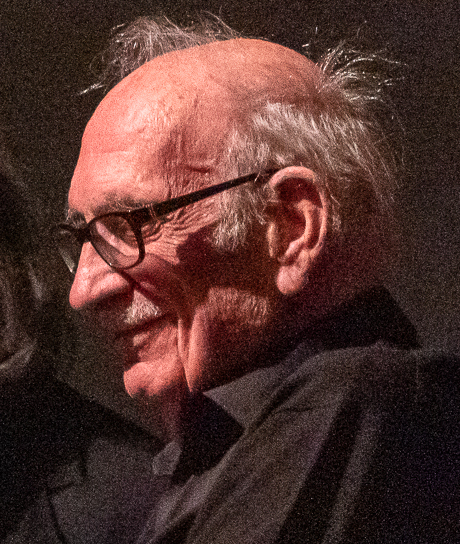
- Crumb in 2019 attending a performance at Alice Tully Hall in honor of his 90th birthday
- Born: George Henry Crumb Jr. 24 October 1929; Charleston, West Virginia, U.S.
- Died: 6 February 2022 (aged 92); Media, Pennsylvania, U.S.
- Education: University of Michigan
- Occupation: Composer
- Notable work: List of compositions
- Awards: Pulitzer Prize for Music; Grammy Award; Full list
- Website: georgecrumb.net

George Henry Crumb Jr. (24 October 1929 – 6 February 2022) was an American composer of avant-garde contemporary classical music. Early in his life he rejected the widespread modernist usage of serialism, developing a highly personal musical language which "range[s] in mood from peaceful to nightmarish". Crumb's compositions are known for pushing the limits of technical prowess by way of frequent use of extended techniques. The unusual timbres he employs evoke a surrealist atmosphere which portray emotions of considerable intensity with vast and sometimes haunting soundscapes. His few large-scale works include Echoes of Time and the River (1967), which won the 1968 Pulitzer Prize for Music, and Star-Child (1977), which won the 2001 Grammy Award for Best Contemporary Classical Composition; however, his output consists of mostly music for chamber ensembles or solo instrumentalists. Among his best known compositions are Black Angels (1970), a striking commentary on the Vietnam War for electric string quartet; Ancient Voices of Children (1970) for a mixed chamber ensemble; and Vox Balaenae (1971), a musical evocation of the humpback whale, for electric flute, electric cello, and amplified piano.

Born to a musical family, Crumb was acquainted with classical music at an early age and his affinity for Classical and Romantic composers in particular would stay throughout his life. He was especially influenced by composers such as Mahler, Debussy and Bartók; Crumb wrote his four-volume piano set Makrokosmos (1972–1979) in response to Bartók's earlier piano set Mikrokosmos. His compositions often contain musical quotations from wide range of composers including Bach, Chopin, Schubert, Strauss, and the jazz pianist and composer Thelonious Monk. The use of pastiche is also found in his music, as is text by Federico García Lorca, whose poetry Crumb set eleven times. Elements of theatricality appear in numerous compositions, inspiring choreographies from contemporary dance groups. To convey his unorthodox and complex musical style, Crumb's musical scores are facsimile manuscripts, using special notation "distinguished by astonishing clarity, precision and elegance, and by arresting graphic symbols in which staves are bent into arches, circles and other pictorial devices." Among his students were the composers Osvaldo Golijov, Jennifer Higdon, Christopher Rouse and Melinda Wagner.

== Life and career ==
=== Upbringing and education (1929–1959) ===
George Henry Crumb Jr. was born in Charleston, West Virginia on 24 October 1929 to a musical family and he grew up playing chamber music with them. Both of Crumb's parents played in the Charleston Symphony Orchestra (CSO); (Note: The Charleston Symphony Orchestra of Crumb's early life has since become the West Virginia Symphony Orchestra.) his father George Henry Crumb Sr. was a clarinetist while his mother Vivian (née Reed) was a cellist. The elder Crumb was a multifaceted musician, with activities that included conducting theatre orchestra for the music of silent film, teaching clarinet privately and at the Mason College, and working as both a music copyist and arranger. George, Jr. began to compose at an early age and had two of his orchestral works performed by the Charleston Symphony Orchestra while he was still in his teens. In 1947 he studied at the National Music Camp in Interlochen, Michigan. He majored in music at the Mason College of Music and Fine Arts (subsequently subsumed into the University of Charleston), where he received his bachelor's degree in 1950. He obtained his M.Mus. at the University of Illinois at Urbana–Champaign in 1952 and then briefly studied as a Fulbright fellow at the Hochschule für Musik in Berlin before returning to the United States to study at the University of Michigan, from which he received a D.M.A. in 1959.

=== Teaching and early works (1960s – early 1970s) ===
He earned his living primarily from teaching. His first teaching job was at a college in Virginia, before he became professor of piano and composition at the University of Colorado in 1958. It was here that he met the pianist David Burge, who asked Crumb to compose a piece for him. While creating this, Crumb woke up in a cold sweat one night, realising that thus far he had simply been rewriting the works of other composers. From here on he began experimenting with new, avant-garde techniques.

In 1965 he began a long association with the University of Pennsylvania, becoming Annenberg Professor of the Humanities in 1983.

From the 1960s on, Crumb's music filled a niche for sophisticated—though still conservative—concertgoers. His music fell between neoclassicism, which was perceived as outmoded, and the more radical music of the avant garde. Although his music from this period exhibits some novel features, it owes more to traditional techniques than to the more experimental areas of the avant-garde.

In this period, Crumb shared with a number of other young composers regarded as being under the umbrella of "new accessibility" a desire to reach out to alienated audiences. In works like Ancient Voices of Children (1970), Crumb employed theatrical ritual, using evocative masks, costumes, and sonorities. In other pieces he asks players to leave and enter the stage during the piece, and has also used unusual layouts of musical notation in a number of his scores. In several pieces, the music is symbolically laid out in a circular or spiral fashion.

Several of Crumb's works, including the four books of madrigals he wrote in the late 1960s and Ancient Voices of Children, a song cycle for two singers and small instrumental ensemble—including a toy piano (1970), are settings of texts by Federico García Lorca. Many of his vocal works were written for the virtuoso mezzo-soprano singer Jan DeGaetani.

Black Angels (Thirteen Images from the Darkland) was written in 1970, and published in 1971, in protest against the Vietnam War, using spoken word, bowed water glasses and electronics. It also explores a wide range of timbres, such as an electric string quartet, with its players required to play various percussion instruments and to bow small goblets as well as to play their instruments in both conventional and unconventional ways. It is one of Crumb's best known pieces, and has been recorded by several groups, including the Kronos Quartet, whose formation was inspired when violinist David Harrington first heard Black Angels.

=== Makrokosmos (1972–1979) ===
Crumb's most ambitious work, and among his more famous, is the 24-piece collection Makrokosmos, published in four books. The first two books (1972, 1973), for solo piano, make extensive use of string piano techniques and require amplification, as dynamics range from pppp to ffff. The third book, known as Music for a Summer Evening (1974), is for two pianos and percussion. The fourth book, Celestial Mechanics (1979), is for piano four-hands.

The title Makrokosmos alludes to Mikrokosmos, the six books of piano pieces by Béla Bartók. Like Bartók's work, Makrokosmos is a series of short character pieces. Apart from Bartók, Claude Debussy is another composer Crumb acknowledged as an influence here: Debussy's Préludes comprise two books of 12 character pieces. Crumb's first two books of Makrokosmos for solo piano contain 12 pieces, each bearing a dedication (a friend's initials, however he also wittily dedicates a piece to himself) at the end. On several occasions, the pianist is required to sing, shout, whistle, whisper, and moan, as well as play the instrument unconventionally. Makrokosmos was premiered by David Burge, who later recorded the work.

=== 1980s – early 2000s ===
During the 1980s and 1990s, Crumb's musical output was less prolific. Beginning in 2000 Crumb wrote a number of works subtitled American Songbook. Each of these works is a set of arrangements of American hymns, spirituals, and popular tunes: Crumb originally planned to produce four such volumes, but in fact he continued to produce additional sets after the fourth (The Winds of Destiny) was written, with the seventh volume of the series (Voices from the Heartland) completed in 2010. Typically these settings preserve the familiar tunes more-or-less intact, but the accompaniments for amplified piano and percussionists use a very wide range of musical techniques and exotic sounds. As of 2017, American Songbook totalled 65 movements, 62 texts, 150 percussion instruments, more than five hours of music.

Crumb retired from teaching in 1995, though in early 2002 he was appointed with David Burge to a joint residency at Arizona State University. He continued to compose.

=== Personal life and death ===
Crumb's son, David Crumb is also a composer and, since 1997, assistant professor at the University of Oregon. George Crumb's daughter, Ann Crumb, was an actress and singer. She recorded his Three Early Songs for the CD George Crumb 70th Birthday Album (1999), and had also performed his Unto the Hills (2001). She died at her parents' home on 31 October 2019.

In his later compositions, which have the subtitle Spanish Songbook, Crumb returned to settings of Lorca. Crumb died in his home in Media, Pennsylvania, on 6 February 2022, at the age of 92.

== Music ==
=== Overview ===
After initially being influenced by Anton Webern, Crumb became interested in exploring unusual timbres, something he considered as important as rhythm, harmony, and counterpoint. He often asks for instruments to be played in unusual ways and several of his pieces, although written for standard chamber music ensembles, such as Black Angels (string quartet) or Ancient Voices of Children (mixed ensemble), call for electronic amplification. Crumb defines music as "a system of proportions in the service of spiritual impulse." Musicologist Richard Taruskin said of Crumb's music: "The ingredients in Crumb’s collages were chosen not as representatives of styles but as expressive symbols of timeless content."

In 1980, Crumb wrote an essay for The Kenyon Review titled, "Music: Does It Have a Future?" In it, he codified his worldview of unified culture and music, arguing that, "the total musical culture of Planet Earth is ‘coming together,’ as it were. An American or European composer, for example, now has access to the music of various Asian, African, and South American cultures. […] This awareness of music in its largest sense—as a worldwide phenomenon—will inevitably have enormous consequences for the music of the future.” Of this worldview, which Crumb noted he still followed 37 years later in a 2017 interview for VAN Magazine, William Dougherty wrote: "Wherever one stands on the ethics of appropriation, it’s undeniable that Crumb, by incorporating in his work sounds from other cultures, succeeded in finding a timbrally rich sound world unlike any of his contemporaries." Of his legacy, Michael Schell said "on the morning of his death Crumb was arguably the most important living composer of piano music, and the last giant in a distinctively American line of innovative percussion writers.". Mark Swed said "Crumb may not have been well known outside of new-music circles, but he mattered beyond those perimeters."

Crumb's works were published by the Edition Peters. Recordings of Crumb's music have appeared on many labels, including several LPs issued by Nonesuch Records in the 1970s. More recently, Bridge Records has issued a series of CDs, the Complete Crumb Edition.

=== Filmography ===
- George Crumb: The Voice of the Whale (1976). Directed and produced by Robert Mugge. Interviewed by Richard Wernick. New York, New York: Rhapsody Films (released 1988).
- Bad Dog!: A Portrait of George Crumb (2009). Directed by David Starobin. Interviews with the composer and performances of Apparition, Three Early Songs and Eine Kleine Mitternachtmusik. Released on DVD by Bridge Records (BRIDGE 9312).

== List of compositions ==
Crumb's works were published by Edition Peters, including:

=== Orchestral ===
- Gethsemane (1947), for small orchestra
- Diptych (1955)
- Variazioni (1959), for large orchestra
- Echoes of Time and the River (Echoes II) (1967)
- A Haunted Landscape (1984)

=== Vocal with orchestral ===
- Star-Child (1977, revised 1979), for soprano, antiphonal children's voices, male speaking choir, bell ringers, and large orchestra

=== Chamber music ===
- Two Duos (1944?), for flute and clarinet
- Four Pieces (1945), for violin and piano
- Violin Sonata (1949)
- Three Pastoral Pieces (1952), for oboe and piano
- Viola Sonata (1953)
- String Quartet (1954)
- Sonata for Solo Cello (1955)
- Four Nocturnes (Night Music II) (1964), for violin and piano
- Eleven Echoes of Autumn, 1965 (Echoes I) (1966), for violin, alto flute, clarinet, and piano
- Black Angels (Images I) (1970), for electric string quartet
- Vox Balaenae (Voice of the Whale) (1971), for electric flute, electric cello, and amplified piano
- Music for a Summer Evening (Makrokosmos III) (1974), for two amplified pianos and percussion (two players).
- Dream Sequence (Images II) (1976), for violin, cello, piano, percussion (one player), and off-stage glass harmonica (two players)
- Pastoral Drone (1982), for organ
- An Idyll for the Misbegotten (Images III) (1986), for amplified flute and percussion (three players).
- Easter Dawning (1991), for carillon
- Quest (1994), for guitar, soprano saxophone, harp, double bass, and percussion (two players)
- Mundus Canis (A Dog's World) (1998), for guitar and percussion
- Xylophony (2015), for percussion (five players)
- Kronos - Kryptos (2019, revised 2020), for percussion (four players)

=== Piano ===
- Piano Sonata (1945)
- Prelude and Toccata (1951)
- Five Pieces (1962)
- Makrokosmos, Volume I (1972), for amplified piano
- Makrokosmos, Volume II (1973), for amplified piano
- Celestial Mechanics (Makrokosmos IV) (1979), for amplified piano (four hands)
- A Little Suite for Christmas, A.D. 1979 (1980)
- Gnomic Variations (1981)
- Processional (1983)
- Zeitgeist (Tableaux Vivants) (1988), for two amplified pianos
- Eine Kleine Mitternachtmusik (A Little Midnight Music) (2001)
- Otherworldly Resonances (2003), for two pianos
- Metamorphoses, Book I (2017)
- Metamorphoses, Book II (2019)

=== Vocal ===
- Four Songs (1945?), for voice, clarinet and piano
- Seven Songs (1946), for voice and piano
- Three Early Songs (1947), for voice and piano
- A Cycle of Greek Lyrics (1950?), for voice and piano
- Night Music I (1963, revised 1976), for soprano, piano/celeste, and two percussionists
- Songs, Drones, and Refrains of Death (1968), for baritone, electric guitar, electric double bass, amplified piano/electric harpsichord, and two percussionists
- Night of the Four Moons (1969), for alto, alto flute/piccolo, banjo, electric cello, and percussion
- Ancient Voices of Children (1970), for mezzo-soprano, boy soprano, oboe, mandolin, harp, amplified piano (and toy piano), and percussion (three players)
- Lux Aeterna (1971) for soprano, bass flute/soprano recorder, sitar, and percussion (two players)
- Apparition (1979), for soprano and amplified piano
- The Sleeper (1984), for soprano and piano
- Federico's Little Songs for Children (1986), for soprano, flute/piccolo/alto flute/bass flute, and harp
- Yesteryear (2005/13), for mezzo-soprano, amplified piano, and percussion (two players)

==== Madrigals ====
- Madrigals, Book I (1965), for soprano, vibraphone, and double bass
- Madrigals, Book II (1965), for soprano, flute/alto flute/piccolo, and percussion
- Madrigals, Book III (1969), for soprano, harp, and percussion
- Madrigals, Book IV (1969), for soprano, flute/alto flute/piccolo, harp, double bass, and percussion

==== American Songbook ====
- American Songbook I: The River of Life (2003), for soprano, percussion quartet and piano
- American Songbook II: A Journey Beyond Time (2003), for soprano, percussion quartet and piano
- American Songbook III: Unto the Hills (2001), for soprano, percussion quartet and piano
- American Songbook IV: Winds of Destiny (2004), for soprano, percussion quartet and piano
- American Songbook V: Voices from a Forgotten World (2007), for soprano, baritone, percussion quartet and piano
- American Songbook VI: Voices from the Morning of the Earth (2008), for soprano, baritone, percussion quartet and piano
- American Songbook VII: Voices from the Heartland (2010), for soprano, baritone, percussion quartet and piano

==== Spanish Songbook ====
- Spanish Songbook I: The Ghosts of Alhambra (2008), for baritone, guitar and percussion
- Spanish Songbook II: Sun and Shadow (2009), for female voice and amplified piano
- Spanish Songbook III: The Yellow Moon of Andalusia (2012), for mezzo-soprano and amplified piano

=== Choral ===
- Alleluja (1948), for unaccompanied chorus

== Awards and honors ==
Crumb was the recipient of a number of awards, including a 1968 Pulitzer Prize for Music for his orchestral work Echoes of Time and the River and a 2001 Grammy Award for Best Contemporary Classical Composition for his work Star-Child. In 1995, Crumb was awarded the Edward MacDowell Medal.

== Notable students ==
Among Crumb's students are the composers Ofer Ben-Amots, Margaret Brouwer, Uri Caine, Robert Carl, Osvaldo Golijov, Jennifer Higdon, Cynthia Cozette Lee, Gerald Levinson, Christopher Rouse, Melinda Wagner and Ricardo Zohn-Muldoon.
