= Ancient Voices of Children =

Musical composition by George Crumb

- Song cycle by George Crumb
- Text: poems by Federico García Lorca
- Language: Spanish
- Composed: 1970
- Performed: October 31, 1970: Library of Congress in Washington, D.C.
- Movements: 5
- Scoring: soprano; boy soprano; oboe; mandolin; harp; amplified piano; toy piano; percussion

Ancient Voices of Children is a musical composition written in 1970 by the American composer George Crumb, and is subtitled "A cycle of songs on texts by Federico García Lorca".

It is scored for soprano, boy soprano, oboe, mandolin, harp, amplified piano (and toy piano), and percussion (three players). It was commissioned by the Elizabeth Sprague Coolidge Foundation.

The piece premiered at the Library of Congress in Washington, D.C., on October 31, 1970, as part of the Coolidge Foundation's 14th Festival of Chamber Music. The first performers were the Contemporary Chamber Ensemble, which featured Gilbert Kalish (piano), Jan DeGaetani (mezzo-soprano), and Michael Dash (boy soprano).

The debut recording, produced by Nonesuch Records in 1971, features the same performers as the premiere performance. This release sold more than 70,000 units; and has become one of the best selling recordings in 20th century classical music.

== Form and compositional style ==
Ancient Voices of Children is composed of five movements of which all but two are setting of fragments of longer poems by García Lorca. Two purely instrumental dance-interludes – "Dances of the Ancient Earth" and "Ghost Dance" – appear between vocal movements.

1. El niño busca su voz (The Little Boy was Looking for his Voice)
  Dances of the Ancient Earth
2. Me he perdido muchas veces por el mar (I have lost myself in the sea many times)
3. ¿De dónde vienes, amor, mi niño? (Dance of the Sacred Life-Cycle)
4. Todas las tardes en Granada, todas las tardes se muere un niño (Each Afternoon in Granada, a Child Dies Each Afternoon)
  Ghost Dance
5. Se ha llenado de luces mi corazón de seda (My silk heart has been filled with lights)

Highly virtuosic in style, Ancient Voices of Children is famous for its bizarre and often eerie vocal effects. Perhaps the most original of these is produced by the soprano singing a kind of fantastic vocalise (based on purely phonetic sounds) into an amplified piano. The singer's voice echoes as the piano strings reverberate sympathetically with the singer. In the last movement, a boy soprano joins the soprano. He briefly sings from off stage before coming on stage for the final vocalise. As with many of Crumb's compositions, Ancient Voices of Children includes a large number of experimental sounds and instruments. This includes prayer stones, Japanese temple bells, a musical saw, and a toy piano. All the performers are also asked to speak, whisper, or yell at times.

Of his inspiration for Ancient Voices of Children Crumb has provided the following insights:

It is sometimes of interest to a composer to recall the original impulse – the 'creative germ' – of a compositional project. In the case of Ancient Voices I felt this impulse to be the climactic final words of the last song: '... and I will go very far ... to ask Christ The Lord to give me back my ancient soul of a child.'
