= Figures—Doubles—Prismes =

Composition for orchestra by French composer Pierre Boulez

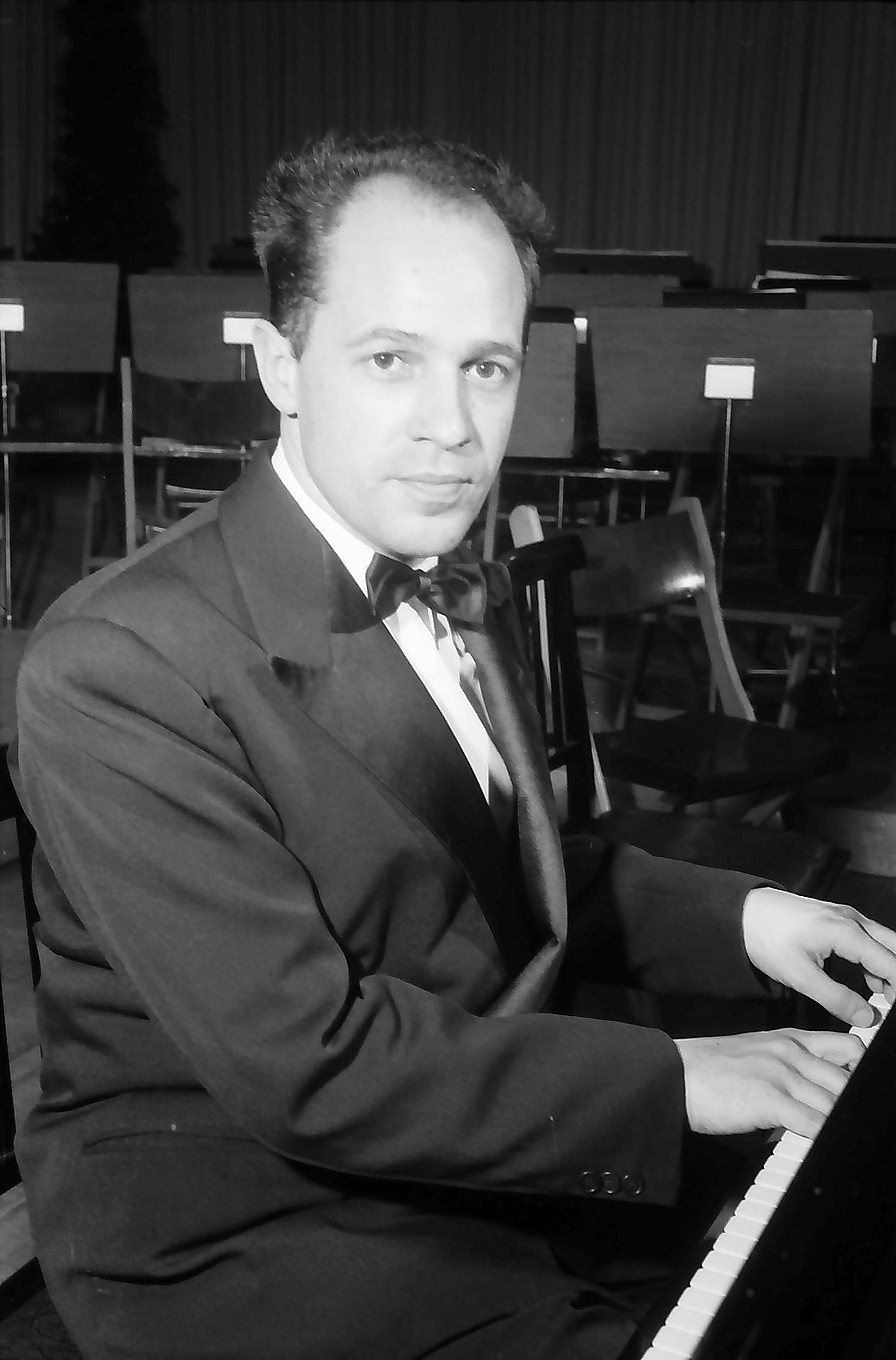
Pierre Boulez in 1956

Figures—Doubles—Prismes is a composition for orchestra by French composer Pierre Boulez. His first purely orchestral work, it is an expansion of an earlier piece dating from 1958 titled Doubles.

== Background ==
In 1957, Igor Markevitch and Georges Auric commissioned Boulez to write a piece for the Société des Concerts Lamoureux. The result was an eight-minute orchestral work that was premiered in Paris on March 16, 1958, and announced as the beginning of a work-in-progress. The piece required a non-traditional seating plan for the players; according to Dominique Jameux, the process of setting up for the performance took roughly twice as long as it took to play the piece.

On January 10, 1964, a slightly expanded fragment of the piece, now titled Figures—Doubles—Prismes, was premiered in Basel by the Südwestrundfunk Orchestra, conducted by the composer. This was followed by a premiere of the complete version, with a duration of roughly twenty minutes, on March 13, 1968 by The Residence Orchestra of The Hague, again conducted by the composer.

== Analysis ==
In Figures—Doubles—Prismes, the orchestra is divided into three groups arranged as follows on the stage:

Layout of instruments
left side	center	right side
strings 1	strings 5 (front)	strings 2
harp 1	celesta	harp 2
brass 1	vibraphone	brass 2
winds 1	winds 3	winds 2
strings 3	xylophone	strings 4
brass 3	harp 3	brass 4
percussion	strings 5 (rear)	timpani

This arrangement allowed Boulez to explore both the characteristic timbres of the various ensembles as well as antiphonal relationships between the groups. Boulez stated: "When you hear the work live, the sonorities are extremely homogeneous yet at the same time scattered, so that it is not a homogeneity of neighbouring groups but a homogeneity of fusion." Figures—Doubles—Prismes is one of a number of works in which Boulez employed spatialized ensembles, others being Domaines (1968), Rituel in memoriam Bruno Maderna (1974–75), and Répons (1980–84).

Regarding the work's title, Boulez commented: "the figure... is the origin; the double... can simply be a variation; and the prism... is the mutual interaction of the figures." He explained: "For me there is a perpetual variation at work... figures and their doubles can make their appearances at certain moments and prisms at others, but the threads of these three aspects of a single reality are constantly present." In the program notes for a 1966 performance by the Cleveland Symphony, Boulez wrote:

Figures refers to simple elements, sharply characterized by dynamics, violence, softness, slowness, and so forth. These elements can be purely harmonic, or more rhythmically oriented, or purely melodic. They are not themes in the conventional way, but "states" of musical being. Doubles has two meanings: the first is that of the eighteenth century word doppelgänger, which means a human double. Thus, in the process of development, each figure may have its double, which is related only to it and no other. Prisms occur when the figures or their doubles refract themselves one through the other. And in this case, one figure becomes the prism, and the other is refracted through it. By this process the maximum complexity is obtained, and the effect will be comparable to that of a kaleidoscope.

== Reception ==
Paul Griffiths stated that, thanks in part to the unusual layout of the instrumental forces in Figures—Doubles—Prismes, "Boulez is able to create orchestral sonorities of marvellously fluid variety and astonishing newness", and that "the rich diversity of the score is also a product of its formal process, by which simple initial ideas are developed in variation and interaction." Susan Bradshaw wrote that the piece "would seem to mark a cross-roads on the long journey of self-(re)discovery that was to lie ahead for Boulez... the piece will continue to fascinate for the sheer virtuosity of its invention, as well as for its explanatory position on the threshold of a future still haunted by a fading echo of the past. Indeed, the very scale of its development makes it reminiscent of an orchestral study in the traditional grand manner... its importance for the future is obvious: by virtue of its existence, Figures—Doubles—Prismes is proof of the previously untested possibility of maintaining the progress of a large-scale work without recourse to melodic characterisation."

Regarding the relationship between the original and finalized versions, writer Allen Edwards, in a study of the work, commented: "if Doubles could be viewed as a portrait of the polar moods of a volcanic personality – nocturnal brooding, alternately seething and contemplative, giving way to bouts of fiery pugilistic confrontation, Figures—Doubles—Prismes could be said to broaden the portrait by introducing, on the one hand, the playful, childlike and humorous sides of the subject..., and on the other hand its fantastic and lyrical sides." In a separate article, Edwards praised the work for its "monumental profile, heroic expression, richness of material, and sophistication of development", and wrote that it is "likely to be considered in time Boulez's Eroica Symphony, and to be accorded a place alongside Pli Selon Pli and Le Marteau sans Maitre as one of the key works by which the composer is universally identified."

In a review of a recording of the work, Andrew Clements called it "fascinating", and, noting the rearrangement of the players, wrote: "For practical reasons more than any other, it is one of the least performed of Boulez's masterpieces. But... it is also one of his most persuasive, with its teeming invention and endlessly vivid imagination for texture and colour." Reviewing a 2015 performance, Colin Anderson praised the piece, writing: "the work begins with a crack and is initially sinewy and exploratory. Pauses introduce significant silence as punctuation, the music alternately beguiling and energetic, combative and ear-grabbing."
