= Rue Beautreillis =

Street in Paris, France

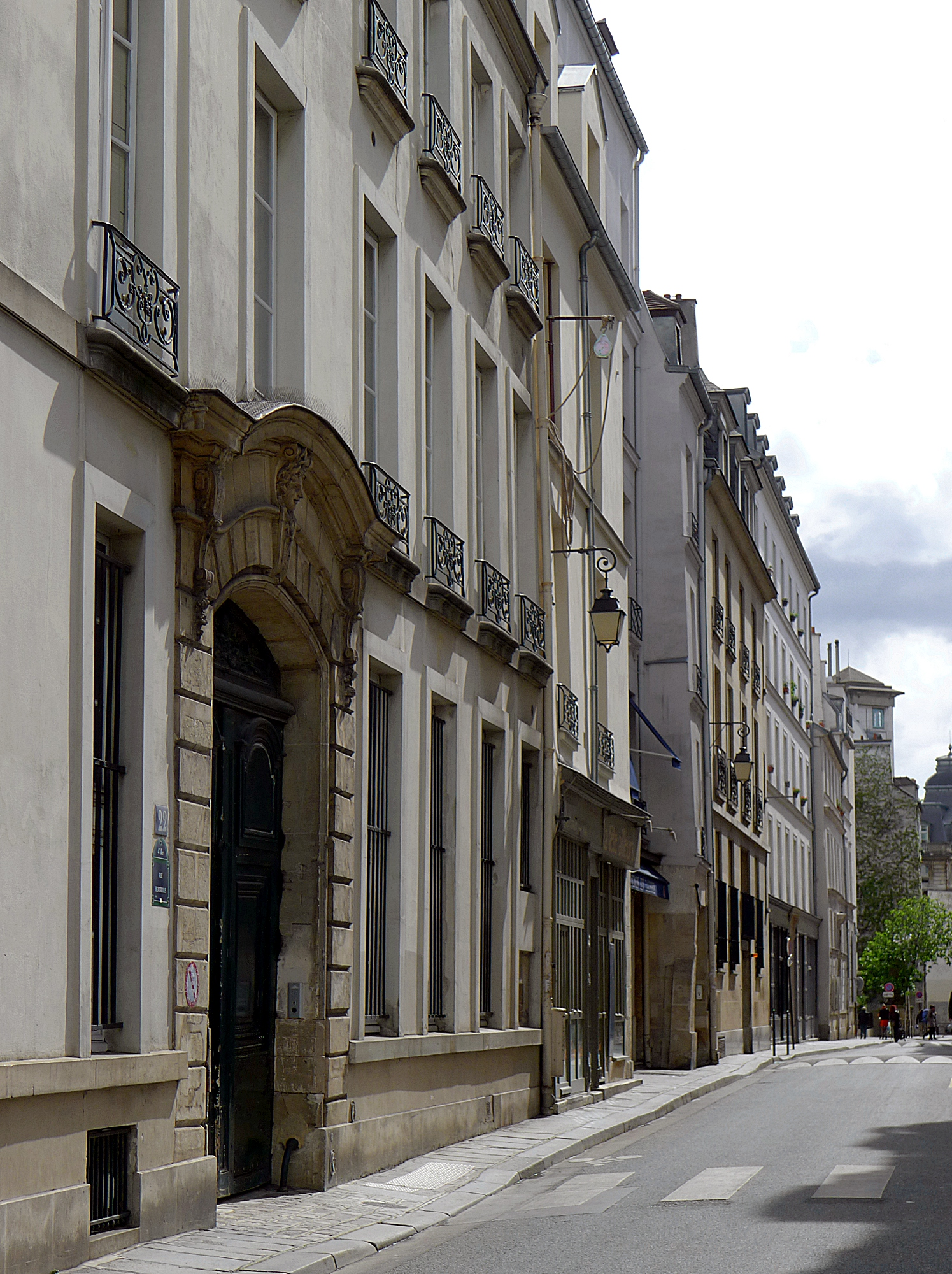
- View of buildings in the Rue Beautreillis

- Location within Paris
- Length: 231 m (758 ft)
- Width: 10 m (33 ft)
- Arrondissement: 4th
- Quarter: Le Marais
- Coordinates: 48.852641°N 2.363310°E
- From: Rue des Lions-Saint-Paul
- To: Rue Saint-Antoine

Construction
- Completion: 1836
- Inauguration: 1555

Rue Beautreillis is a street in Le Marais, a historic area of the 4th arrondissement in central Paris, France.

== Location ==
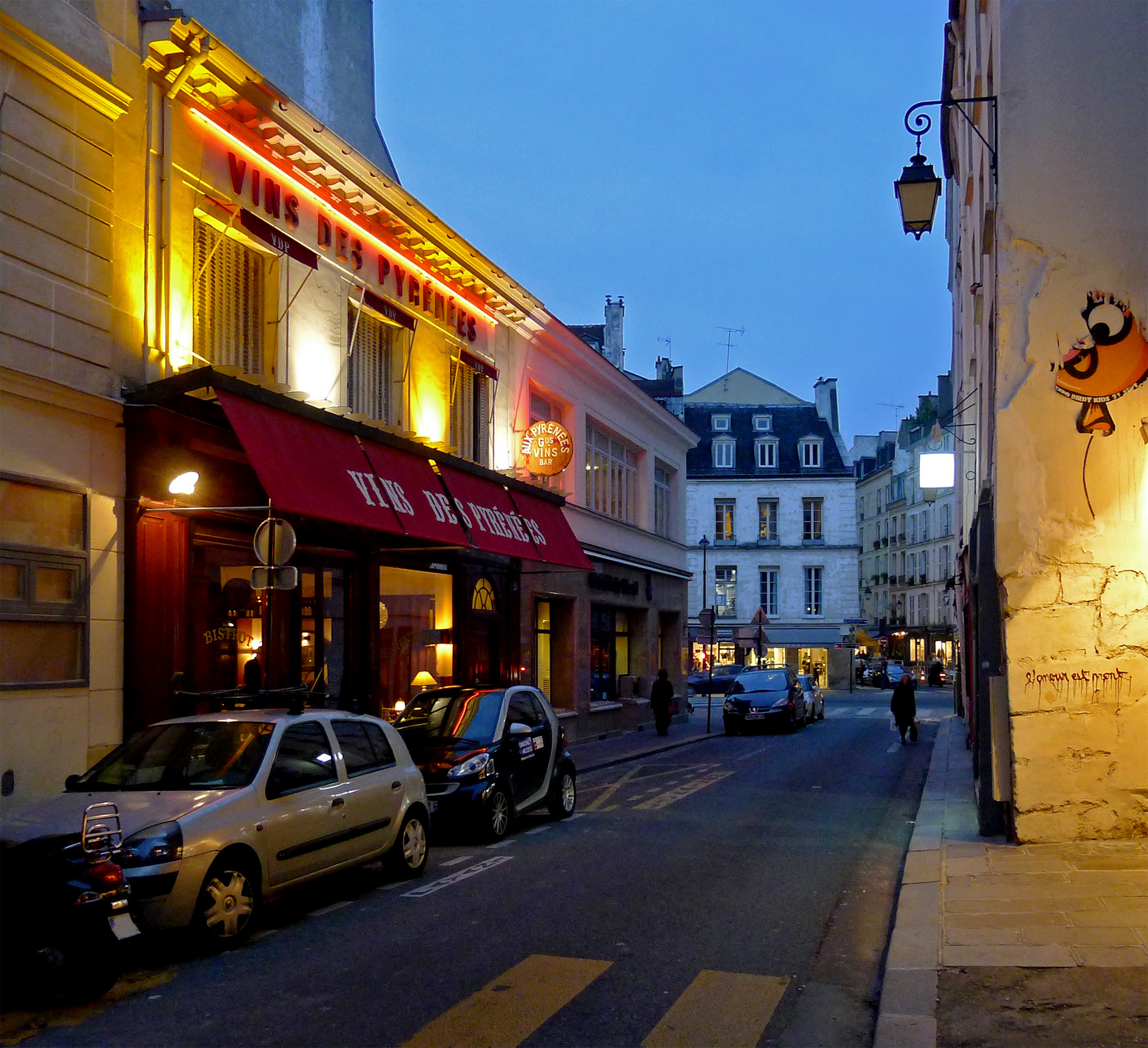
Evening view of Rue Beautreillis

Rue Beautreillis lies almost parallel to the Rue Saint-Paul and the Rue du Petit-Musc; it begins at Rue des Lions-Saint-Paul and ends at Rue Saint-Antoine. It successively crosses Rue Charles-V and Rue Neuve-Saint-Pierre.

Like many streets in old Paris, its narrow width is uneven and its buildings include traces of its long history of houses, hotels and buildings dating from different eras.

== Toponymy ==
The street's name, attributed in 1555, is in memory of Hôtel de Beautreillis, which was built on the site of Hôtel Saint-Pol; it takes its name from the vines against the walls of the garden.

== History ==
The street is cited under the names of Rue Girard-Bocquet (Note: This is the name given to the part of Rue Beautreillis that goes from the Rue des Lions to the Rue Charles-V, then Rue Neuve-Saint-Paul.) and Rue de Beau-trillis in a manuscript of 1636 where the records indicate that it is "found orderly, room and full of mud and filth."

By ministerial decision of 6 September 1836, the length of this road was increased from 188 metres (617 ft) to 231 metres (758 ft) by absorption of Rue Gérard-Beauquet (Note: Taken from the name of the owner of Hôtel de Beautreillis.) formerly the Rue du Pistolet.

It was at a barricade parallel to Rue Beautreillis, on Rue Saint-Antoine, that General François de Négrier was killed in June 1848.

== Notable buildings and events ==
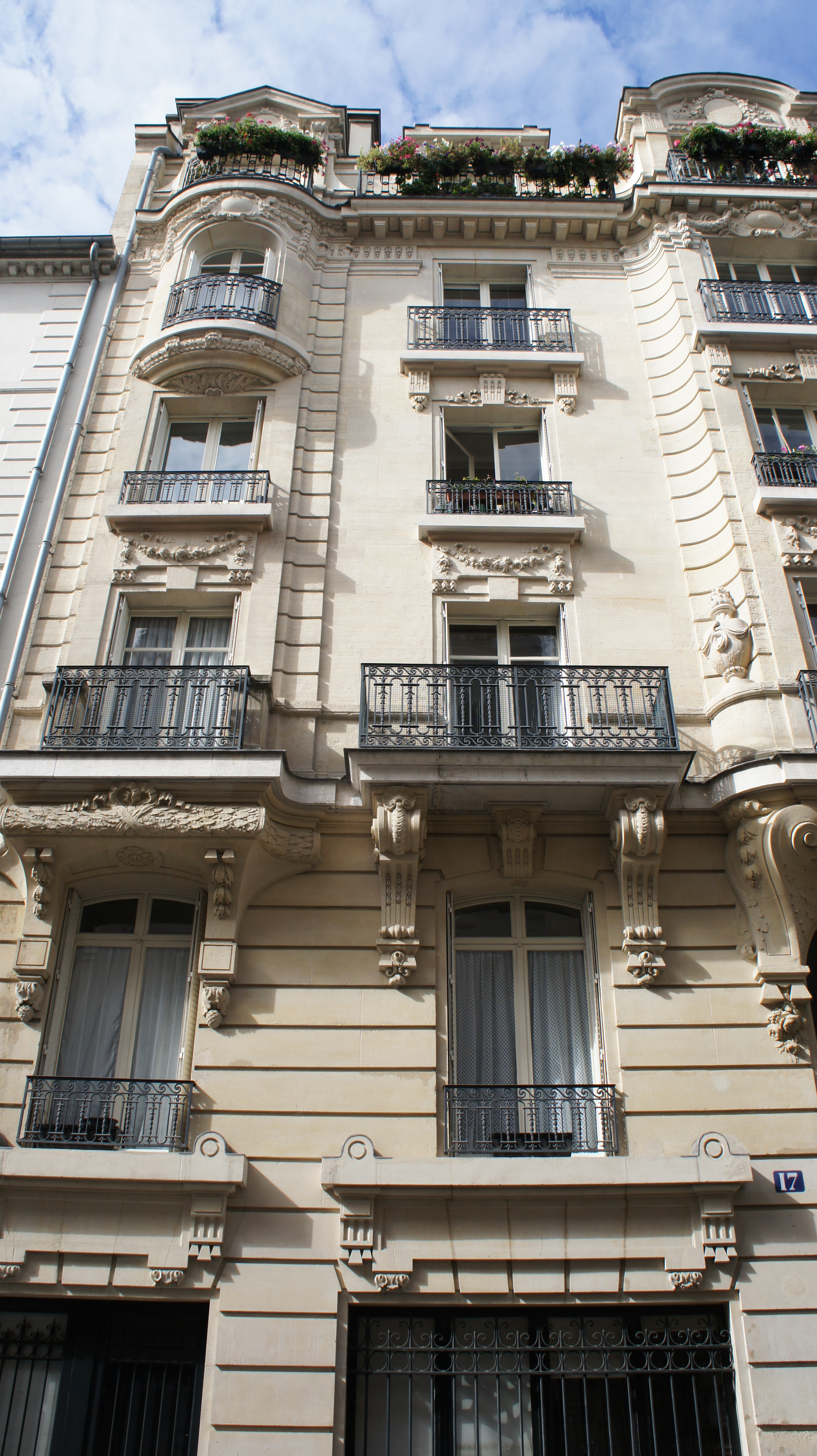
No. 17, where Jim Morrison died in 1971

- Eugène Grangé (1810–1887) was born in the street on 16 December 1810 at the theatre there
- No. 4: Pierre Boulez (1925−2016), composer and conductor, lived there from 1945 to 1958
- No. 6: remains of the Hôtel Raoul
- No. 7: house with wrought iron terrace (historic monument).
- No. 16: Victorien Sardou (1831–1908), dramatist, was born there on 5 September 1831
- No. 17: Jim Morrison (1943–1971), lead singer of The Doors, died there in an apartment in the building, on 3 July 1971
- No. 22: Charles Baudelaire (1821–1867), poet, lived there with Jeanne Duval (c. 1820–c. 1862), actress and dancer.
