= Joan Peyser =

American musicologist and writer (1930–2011)

- Born: Joan Gilbert; June 12, 1930; Manhattan, New York
- Died: April 24, 2011 (aged 80); Manhattan, New York
- Education: BA Barnard College (1951); MA Columbia University (1956)

Joan Peyser (June 12, 1930 – April 24, 2011) was an American musicologist and writer, particularly known for her writing on 20th-century music and for her biographies of George Gershwin, Pierre Boulez and Leonard Bernstein. Her biography of Bernstein was, according to Leon Botstein, the first attempt at a critical account of his life and work.

== Life and career ==
Born Joan Gilbert in Manhattan, Peyser began studying piano when she was 5 and gave her first recital at the age of 13 in New York's Town Hall. When she enrolled at the High School of Music and Art in Manhattan, she continued to study piano and took up the viola as well. After graduating from high school, she attended Smith College from 1947 to 1949 and then went to Barnard College where she majored in music and received her BA in 1951. She earned her MA in musicology in 1956 from Columbia University studying under Paul Henry Lang. She was one of the winners of ASCAP's first annual Deems Taylor Award for excellence in music writing with her 1966 article on the American composer Marc Blitzstein ("The Troubled Times of Marc Blitzstein" published in the Columbia University Forum).

She went on to win the award four more times during her career. The Biltzstein article brought her to the attention of Delacorte Press, who gave her a contract for her first book, The New Music: the Sense behind the Sound, published in 1971. In addition to her books and scholarly articles, she was editor of The Musical Quarterly from 1977 to 1984 and a regular contributor to The New York Times, Commentary, Vogue, and Opera News.

Joan Peyser died in Manhattan on April 24, 2011, aged 80, following heart surgery.

== Selected bibliography ==
- The New Music: the Sense behind the Sound (New York: Delacorte Press, 1971 (the revised 2nd edition was published in 1980 as Twentieth-Century Music: the Sense behind the Sound))
- Boulez: Composer, Conductor, Enigma (New York: Schirmer Books, 1976)
- The Orchestra: Origins and Transformations (New York: Charles Scribner's Sons, 1986 (editor))
- Bernstein: a Biography (New York: Beech Tree Books, 1987)
- The Memory of all That: the Life of George Gershwin (New York: Simon & Schuster, 1993)
- The Music of My Time (New York: Pro/AM Music Resources Inc., 1995), foreword by Milton Babbitt
