= Pierre Boulez =

French composer and conductor (1925–2016)

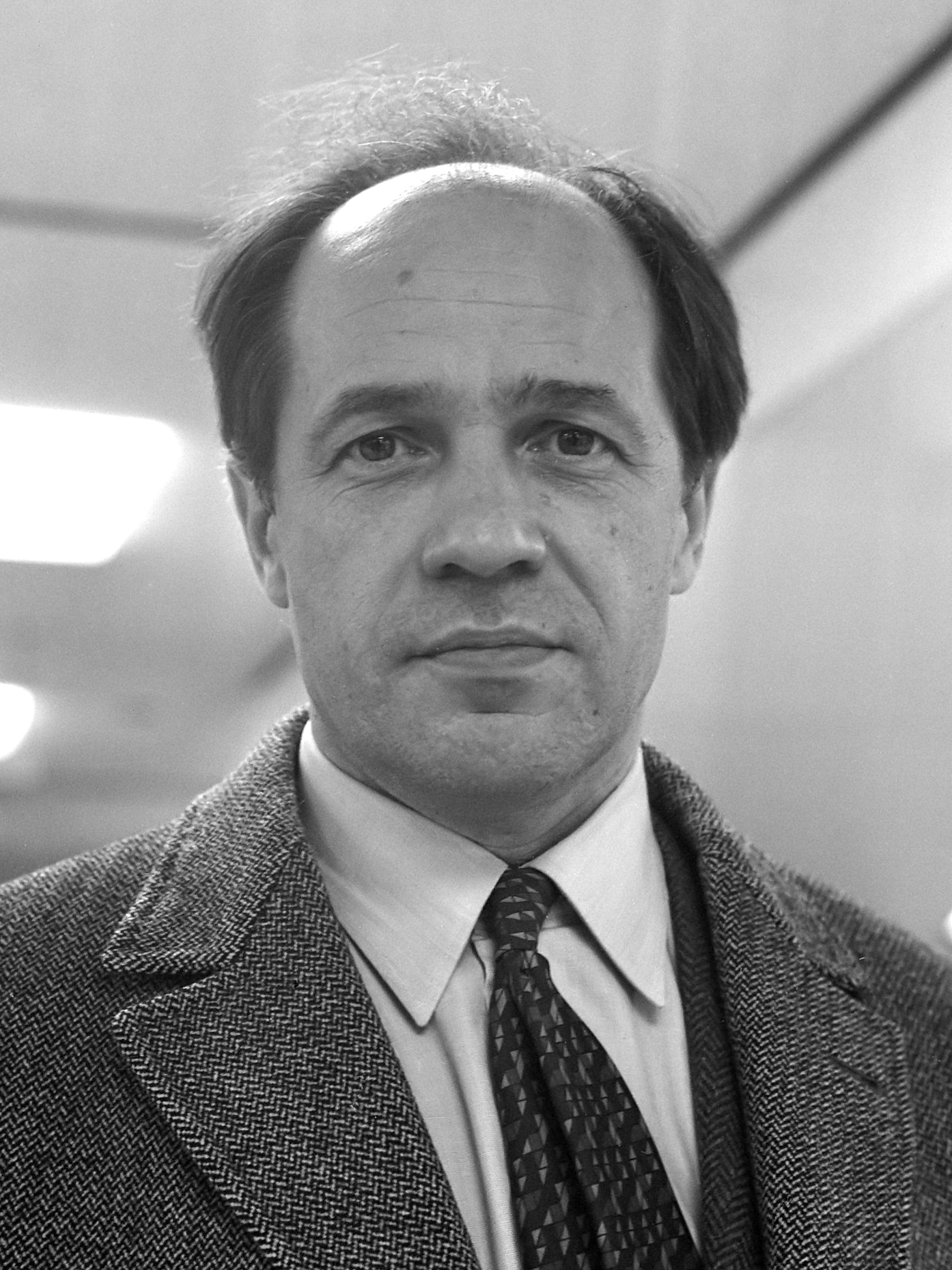
Boulez in 1968

Pierre Louis Joseph Boulez (French: [pjɛʁ lwi ʒozεf bulɛz]; 26 March 1925 – 5 January 2016) was a French composer, conductor and writer, and the founder of several musical institutions. He was one of the dominant figures of post-war contemporary classical music.

Born in Montbrison, in the Loire department of France, the son of an engineer, Boulez studied at the Conservatoire de Paris with Olivier Messiaen, and privately with Andrée Vaurabourg and René Leibowitz. He began his professional career in the late 1940s as music director of the Renaud-Barrault theatre company in Paris. He was a leading figure in avant-garde music, playing an important role in the development of integral serialism in the 1950s, controlled chance music in the 1960s and the electronic transformation of instrumental music in real time from the 1970s onwards. His tendency to revise earlier compositions meant that his body of work was relatively small, but it included pieces considered landmarks of twentieth-century music, such as Le Marteau sans maître, Pli selon pli and Répons. His uncompromising commitment to modernism and the trenchant, polemical tone in which he expressed his views on music led some to criticise him as a dogmatist.

Boulez was also one of the most prominent conductors of his generation. In a career lasting more than sixty years, he was music director of the New York Philharmonic, chief conductor of the BBC Symphony Orchestra and principal guest conductor of the Chicago Symphony Orchestra and the Cleveland Orchestra. He made frequent appearances with many other orchestras, including the Vienna Philharmonic and the Berlin Philharmonic. He was known for his performances of the music of the first half of the twentieth century—including Debussy and Ravel, Stravinsky and Bartók, and the Second Viennese School—as well as that of his contemporaries, such as Ligeti, Berio and Carter. His work in the opera house included the production of Wagner's Ring cycle for the centenary of the Bayreuth Festival, and the world premiere of the three-act version of Berg's opera Lulu. His recorded legacy is extensive.

He also founded several musical institutions. In Paris he set up the Domaine musical in the 1950s to promote new music; in the 1970s he established the Institut de Recherche et Coordination Acoustique / Musique (IRCAM), to foster research and innovation in music, and the Ensemble intercontemporain, a chamber orchestra specialising in contemporary music. Later he co-founded the Cité de la musique, a concert hall, museum and library dedicated to music in the Parc de la Villette in Paris and, in Switzerland, the Lucerne Festival Academy, an international orchestra of young musicians, with which he gave first performances of many new works.

== Biography ==
=== 1925–1943: Childhood and school days ===
Pierre Boulez was born on 26 March 1925, in Montbrison, a small town in the Loire department of east-central France, to Léon and Marcelle (née Calabre) Boulez. He was the third of four children: an older sister, Jeanne (1922–2018) and younger brother, Roger (b. 1936) were preceded by another child called Pierre (b. 1920), who died after a few months. Léon (1891–1969), an engineer and technical director of a steel factory, is described by biographers as an authoritarian figure with a strong sense of fairness, and Marcelle (1897–1985) as an outgoing, good-humoured woman, who deferred to her husband's strict Catholic beliefs, while not necessarily sharing them. The family prospered, moving in 1929 from the apartment above a pharmacy, where Boulez was born, to a comfortable detached house, where he spent most of his childhood.

From the age of seven Boulez went to school at the Institut Victor de Laprade, a Catholic seminary where the thirteen-hour school day was filled with study and prayer. By the age of eighteen he had repudiated Catholicism; later in life he described himself as an agnostic.

As a child, Boulez took piano lessons, played chamber music with local amateurs and sang in the school choir. After completing the first part of his baccalaureate a year early, he spent the academic year of 1940–41 at the Pensionnat St. Louis, a boarding school in nearby Saint-Étienne. The following year he took classes in advanced mathematics at the Cours Sogno in Lyon (a school established by the Lazaristes) with a view to gaining admission to the École Polytechnique in Paris. His father hoped this would lead to a career in engineering. Wartime conditions in Lyon were already harsh; they became harsher still when the Vichy government fell, the Germans took over and the city became a centre of the resistance.

In Lyon, Boulez first heard an orchestra, saw his first operas (Mussorgsky's Boris Godunov and Wagner's Die Meistersinger von Nürnberg) and met the soprano Ninon Vallin, who asked him to play for her. Impressed by his ability, she persuaded his father to allow him to apply to the Conservatoire de Lyon. He was rejected but was determined to pursue a career in music. The following year, with his sister's support in the face of opposition from his father, he studied piano and harmony privately with Lionel de Pachmann (son of the pianist Vladimir de Pachmann). "Our parents were strong, but finally we were stronger than they", Boulez later said. In the event, when he moved to Paris in the autumn of 1943, hoping to enroll at the Conservatoire de Paris, his father accompanied him, helped him to find a room (in the 7th arrondissement) and subsidised him until he could earn a living.

=== 1943–1946: Musical education ===
In October 1943, Boulez auditioned unsuccessfully for the advanced piano class at the Conservatoire, but he was admitted in January 1944 to the preparatory harmony class of Georges Dandelot. He made rapid progress, and by May 1944 Dandelot was describing him as "the best of the class".

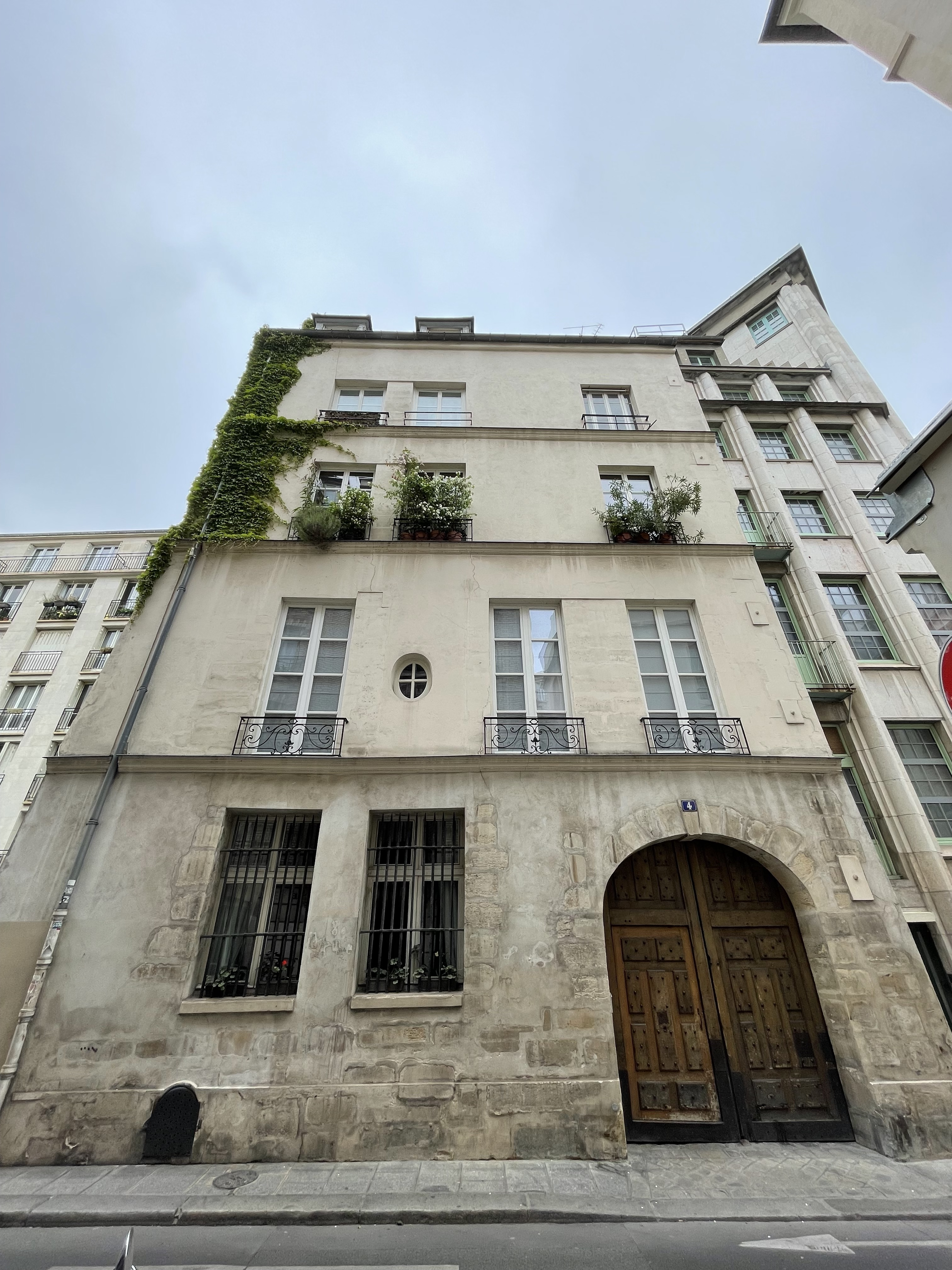
4, rue Beautreillis in Paris, where Boulez lived from 1945 to 1958

Around the same time he was introduced to Andrée Vaurabourg, wife of the composer Arthur Honegger. Between April 1944 and May 1946 he studied counterpoint privately with her. In June 1944 he approached Olivier Messiaen and asked to study harmony with him. Messiaen invited him to attend the private seminars he gave to selected students; in January 1945, Boulez joined Messiaen's advanced harmony class at the Conservatoire.

Boulez moved to two small attic rooms on Rue Beautreillis in the Marais district of Paris, where he lived for the next thirteen years. In February 1945 he attended a private performance of Schoenberg's Wind Quintet, conducted by René Leibowitz, the composer and follower of Schoenberg. The strict use of twelve-tone technique in the Quintet was a revelation to Boulez, who organised a group of fellow students to take private lessons with Leibowitz. It was here that he also discovered the music of Webern. He eventually found Leibowitz's approach too doctrinaire and broke angrily with him in 1946 when Leibowitz tried to criticise one of his early works.

In June 1945, Boulez was one of four Conservatoire students awarded premier prix. He was described in the examiner's report as "the most gifted—a composer". Although registered at the Conservatoire for the academic year 1945–46, he soon boycotted Simone Plé-Caussade's counterpoint and fugue class, infuriated by what he described as her "lack of imagination", and organised a petition that Messiaen be given a full professorship in composition. (Note: Messiaen was not appointed professor of composition until 1949.) Over the winter of 1945–46 Boulez immersed himself in Balinese and Japanese music and African drumming at the Musée Guimet and the Musée de l'Homme in Paris: "I almost chose the career of an ethnomusicologist because I was so fascinated by that music. It gives a different feeling of time."

=== 1946–1953: Early career in Paris ===
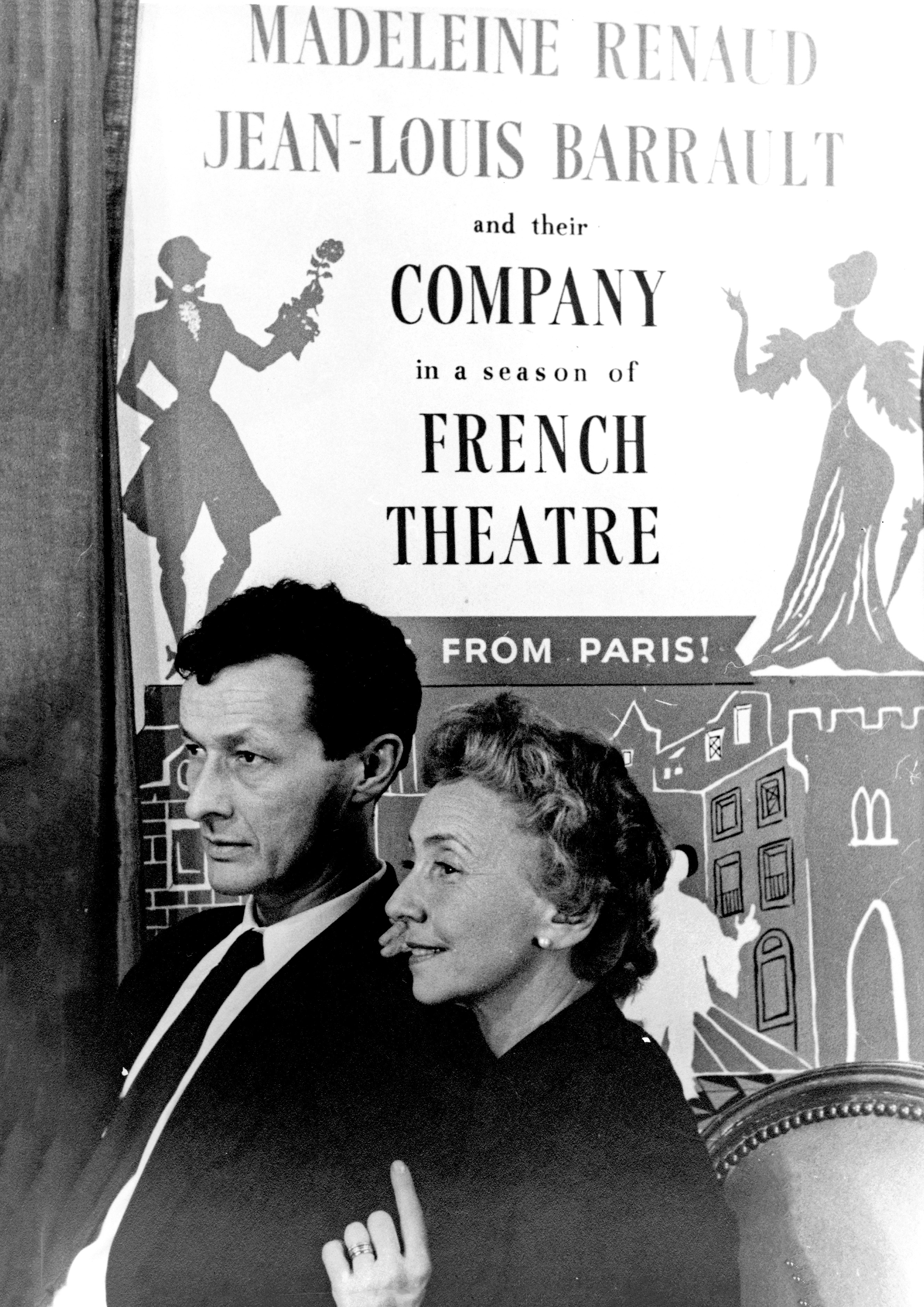
Jean-Louis Barrault and Madeleine Renaud in 1952, by Carl Van Vechten

On 12 February 1946, the pianist Yvette Grimaud gave the first public performances of Boulez's music (Douze Notations and Trois Psalmodies) at the Concerts du Triptyque. Boulez earned money by giving maths lessons to his landlord's son. He also played the ondes Martenot (an early electronic instrument), improvising accompaniments to radio dramas and occasionally deputising in the pit orchestra of the Folies Bergère. In October 1946, the actor and director Jean-Louis Barrault engaged him to play the ondes for a production of Hamlet for the new company he and his wife, Madeleine Renaud, had formed at the Théâtre Marigny. Boulez was soon appointed music director of the Compagnie Renaud-Barrault, a post he held for nine years. He arranged and conducted incidental music, mostly by composers whose music he disliked (such as Milhaud and Tchaikovsky), but it gave him the chance to work with professional musicians, while leaving time to compose during the day.

His involvement with the company also broadened his horizons: in 1947 they toured to Belgium and Switzerland ("absolutely pays de cocagne, my first discovery of the big world"); in 1948 they took Hamlet to the second Edinburgh International Festival; in 1951 they gave a season of plays in London, at the invitation of Laurence Olivier; and between 1950 and 1957 there were three tours to South America and two to North America. Much of the music he wrote for the company was lost after the occupation by students of the Théâtre de l'Odéon during the civil unrest in May 1968.

The period between 1947 and 1950 was one of intense compositional activity for Boulez. New works included the first two piano sonatas and initial versions of two cantatas on poems by René Char, Le Visage nuptial (Note: The Nuptial Countenance.) and Le Soleil des eaux. (Note: The Sun of the Waters,) In October 1951, a substantial work for eighteen solo instruments, Polyphonie X, caused a scandal at its premiere at the Donaueschingen Festival, some audience members whistling and hissing during the performance.

Around this time, Boulez met two composers who were to be important influences: John Cage and Karlheinz Stockhausen. His friendship with Cage began in 1949 when Cage was visiting Paris. Cage introduced Boulez to two publishers (Heugel and Amphion) who agreed to take his recent pieces; Boulez helped to arrange a private performance of Cage's Sonatas and Interludes for Prepared Piano. When Cage returned to New York they began an intense, six-year correspondence about the future of music. Their friendship later cooled as Boulez could not accept Cage's increasing commitment to compositional procedures based on chance; he later broke off contact with him. In 1952 Stockhausen arrived in Paris to study with Messiaen. Although Boulez knew no German and Stockhausen no French, the rapport between them was instant: "A friend translated [and] we gesticulated wildly ... We talked about music all the time—in a way I've never talked about it with anyone else."

In July 1952, Boulez attended the International Summer Course for New Music in Darmstadt for the first time. As well as Stockhausen, Boulez was in contact there with other composers who would become significant figures in contemporary music, including Luciano Berio and Luigi Nono. Boulez quickly became one of the leaders of the post-war modernist movement in the arts. As the music critic Alex Ross observed: "at all times he seemed absolutely sure of what he was doing. Amid the confusion of postwar life, with so many truths discredited, his certitude was reassuring."

=== 1954–1959: Le Domaine musical ===
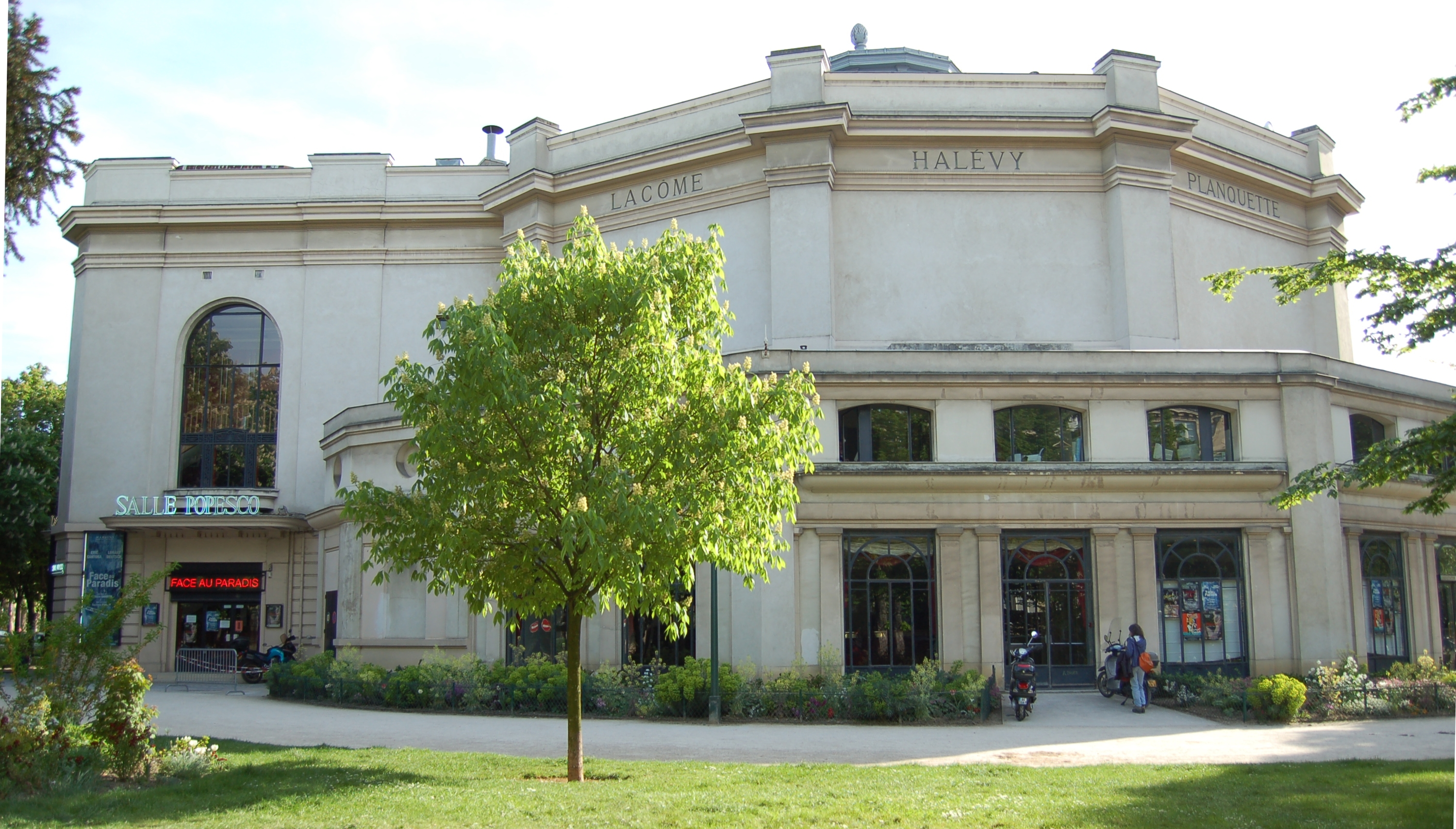
The Salle Popesco in Paris, formerly the Petit Marigny

In 1954, with the financial backing of Barrault and Renaud, Boulez started a series of concerts at the Petit Marigny theatre, which became known as the Domaine musical. The concerts focused initially on three areas: pre-war classics still unfamiliar in Paris (such as Bartók and Webern), works by the new generation (Stockhausen, Nono) and neglected masters from the past (Machaut, Gesualdo)—although the last category fell away in subsequent seasons, in part because of the difficulty of finding musicians with experience of playing early music. Boulez proved an energetic and accomplished administrator and the concerts were an immediate success. They attracted musicians, painters and writers, as well as fashionable society, but they were so expensive that Boulez had to turn to wealthy patrons for support.

Key events in the Domaine's history included a Webern festival (1955), the European premiere of Stravinsky's Agon (1957) and first performances of Messiaen's Oiseaux exotiques (1955) and Sept haïkaï (1963). Boulez remained director until 1967, when Gilbert Amy succeeded him.

On 18 June 1955, Hans Rosbaud conducted the first performance of Boulez's best-known work, Le Marteau sans maître, (Note: The Hammer without a Master.) at the ISCM Festival in Baden-Baden. A nine-movement cycle for alto voice and instrumental ensemble based on poems by René Char, it was an immediate, international success. William Glock wrote: "even at a first hearing, though difficult to take in, it was so utterly new in sound, texture and feeling that it seemed to possess a mythical quality like that of Schoenberg's Pierrot lunaire". When Boulez conducted the work in Los Angeles in early 1957, Stravinsky attended the performance; he later described the piece as "one of the few significant works of the post-war period of exploration". Boulez dined several times with the Stravinskys and (according to Robert Craft) "soon captivated the older composer with new musical ideas, and an extraordinary intelligence, quickness and humour". Relations between the two composers soured the following year over the first Paris performance of Stravinsky's Threni for the Domaine musical. Poorly planned by Boulez and nervously conducted by Stravinsky, the performance broke down more than once.

In January 1958, the Improvisations sur Mallarmé (I et II) were premiered, forming the kernel of a piece which grew over the next four years into a large-scale, five-movement "portrait of Mallarmé", Pli selon pli. (Note: Fold upon Fold.) It received its premiere in Donaueschingen in October 1962.

Around this time, Boulez's relations with Stockhausen deteriorated as (according to the biographer Joan Peyser) he saw the younger man supplanting him as the leader of the avant-garde.

=== 1959–1971: International conducting career ===
In 1959, Boulez left Paris for Baden-Baden, where he had an arrangement with the Southwest German Radio Symphony Orchestra to work as composer-in-residence and to conduct some smaller concerts. He also had access to an electronic studio where he could work on a new piece (Poésie pour pouvoir). (Note: Poetry for Power.) He moved into, and eventually bought, a large hillside villa, which was his main home for the rest of his life.

During this period, he turned increasingly to conducting. His first engagement as an orchestral conductor had been in 1956, when he conducted the Venezuela Symphony Orchestra while on tour with Barrault. His breakthrough came in 1959 when he replaced the ailing Hans Rosbaud at short notice in demanding programmes of twentieth-century music at the Aix-en-Provence and Donaueschingen Festivals. This led to debuts with the Amsterdam Concertgebouw, Bavarian Radio Symphony and Berlin Philharmonic orchestras.

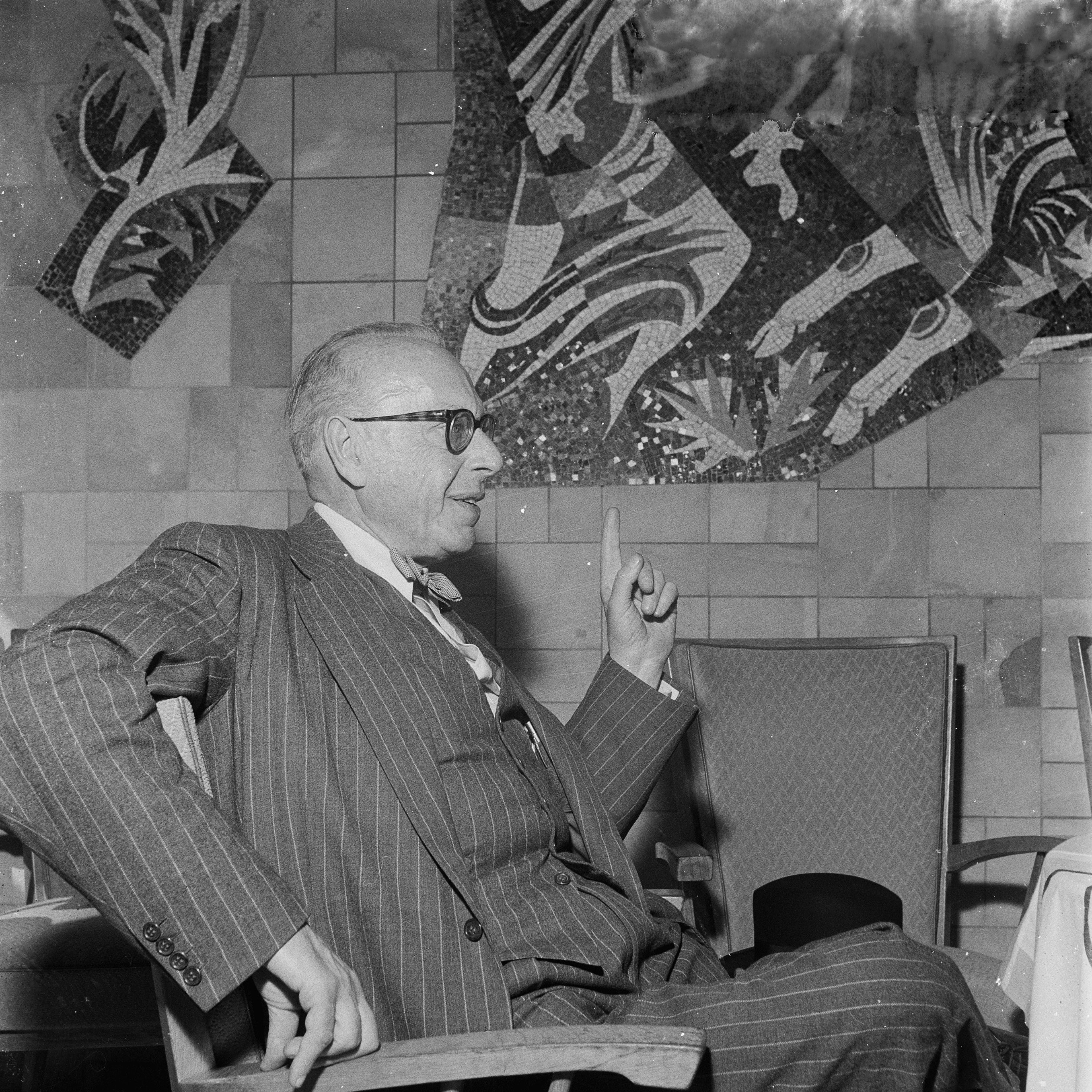
George Szell in 1957

In 1963 Boulez conducted his first opera, Berg's Wozzeck at the Opéra National de Paris, directed by Barrault. The conditions were exceptional, with thirty orchestral rehearsals instead of the usual three or four; the critical response was favourable and after the first performance the musicians rose to applaud him. He conducted Wozzeck again in April 1966 at the Oper Frankfurt in a new production by Wieland Wagner.

Wieland Wagner had already invited Boulez to conduct Wagner's Parsifal at the Bayreuth Festival later in the season, and Boulez returned to conduct revivals in 1967, 1968 and 1970. He also conducted performances of Wagner's Tristan und Isolde with the Bayreuth company at the Osaka Festival in Japan in 1967, but the lack of adequate rehearsal made it an experience he later said he would rather forget. His conducting of the new production (by Václav Kašlík) of Debussy's Pelléas et Mélisande at Covent Garden in 1969 was praised for its combination of "delicacy and sumptuousness".

In 1965, the Edinburgh International Festival staged the first large-scale retrospective of Boulez as composer and conductor. In 1966, he proposed a reorganisation of French musical life to the minister of culture, André Malraux, but Malraux instead appointed the conservative Marcel Landowski as head of music at the Ministry of Culture. Boulez expressed his fury in an article in the Nouvel Observateur, announcing that he was "going on strike with regard to any aspect of official music in France".

In March 1965, Boulez had made his orchestral debut in the United States with the Cleveland Orchestra. In February 1969 he became its principal guest conductor and, on the death of George Szell in July 1970, assumed the role of music advisor for two years. In the 1968–69 season, he also made guest appearances in Boston, Chicago and Los Angeles.

Apart from Pli selon pli, Boulez's only substantial new work to emerge in the first half of the 1960s was the final version of Book 2 of his Structures for two pianos. Midway through the decade, he produced several new works, including Éclat (1965), (Note: The French word has many meanings, including "splinter" and "burst".) a short and brilliant piece for small ensemble, which by 1970 had grown into a substantial half-hour work, Éclat/Multiples.

=== 1971–1977: London and New York ===
Boulez first conducted the BBC Symphony Orchestra in February 1964, at Worthing, accompanying Vladimir Ashkenazy in a Chopin piano concerto. Boulez recalled: "It was terrible, I felt like a waiter who keeps dropping the plates." His appearances with the orchestra over the next five years included his debuts at the Proms and at Carnegie Hall (1965) and tours to Moscow and Leningrad, Berlin and Prague (1967). In January 1969 William Glock, controller of music at the BBC, announced his appointment as chief conductor. Two months later, Boulez conducted the New York Philharmonic for the first time. His performances so impressed both orchestra and management that he was offered the chief conductorship in succession to Leonard Bernstein. Glock was dismayed and tried to persuade him that accepting the New York position would detract both from his work in London and his ability to compose but Boulez could not resist the opportunity (as Glock put it) "to reform the music-making of both these world cities" and in June the New York appointment was confirmed.

His tenure in New York lasted between 1971 and 1977 and was not an unqualified success. The dependence on a subscription audience limited his programming. He introduced more key works from the first half of the twentieth century and, with earlier repertoire, sought out less well-known pieces. In his first season, he conducted Liszt's The Legend of Saint Elizabeth and Via Crucis. Performances of new music were comparatively rare in the subscription series. The players admired his musicianship but regarded him as dry and unemotional compared to Bernstein, although it was widely accepted that he improved the standard of playing. He returned on only three occasions to the orchestra in later years.

Boulez's time with the BBC Symphony Orchestra was happier. With the resources of the BBC behind him, he could be bolder in his choice of repertoire. There were occasional forays into the classical and romantic repertoire, particularly at the Proms (Beethoven's Missa solemnis in 1972; the Brahms German Requiem in 1973), but for the most part he worked intensively with the orchestra on the music of the twentieth century. He conducted works by the younger generation of British composers—such as Harrison Birtwistle and Peter Maxwell Davies—but Britten and Tippett were absent from his programmes. His relations with the musicians were generally excellent. He was chief conductor between 1971 and 1975, continuing as chief guest conductor until 1977. Thereafter he returned to the orchestra frequently until his last appearance in an all-Janáček programme at a 2008 Prom.

In both cities, Boulez sought out venues where new music could be presented more informally: in New York he began a series of "Rug Concerts"—when the seats in Avery Fisher Hall were taken out and the audience sat on the floor—and a contemporary music series called "Prospective Encounters" in Greenwich Village; in London he gave concerts at the Roundhouse, a former railway turntable shed which Peter Brook had also used for radical theatre productions. His aim was "to create a feeling that we are all, audience, players and myself, taking part in an act of exploration".

In 1972, Wolfgang Wagner, who had succeeded his brother Wieland as director of the Bayreuth Festival, invited Boulez to conduct the 1976 centenary production of Wagner's Der Ring des Nibelungen. (Note: Known as the Jahrhundertring.) The director was Patrice Chéreau. Highly controversial in its first year, according to Barry Millington by the end of the run in 1980 "enthusiasm for the production vastly outweighed disapproval". It was televised around the world.

A few new works emerged during this period, of which perhaps the most important is Rituel in memoriam Bruno Maderna, a large-scale orchestral work, prompted by the death at a relatively young age of Boulez's friend and fellow composer.

=== 1977–1992: IRCAM ===
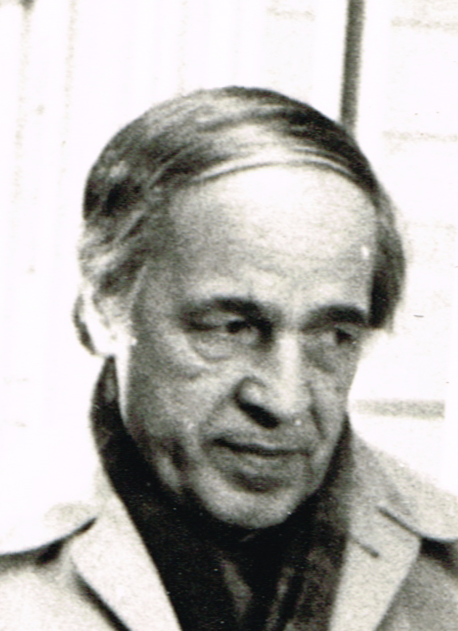
Boulez in 1985

In 1970, Boulez was asked by President Pompidou to return to France and set up an institute specialising in musical research and creation at the arts complex—now known as the Centre Georges Pompidou—which was planned for the Beaubourg district of Paris. The Institut de Recherche et Coordination Acoustique / Musique (IRCAM) opened in 1977.

Boulez's model was the Bauhaus, which had been a meeting place for artists and scientists of all disciplines. IRCAM's aims included research into acoustics, instrumental design and the use of computers in music. The original building was constructed underground, partly to isolate it acoustically (an above-ground extension was added later). The institution was criticised for absorbing too much state subsidy, Boulez for wielding too much power. At the same time he founded the Ensemble intercontemporain, a virtuoso ensemble dedicated to contemporary music.

In 1979, Boulez conducted the world premiere of the three-act version of Berg's Lulu at the Paris Opera in Friedrich Cerha's completion of the work, left unfinished at Berg's death. It was directed by Chéreau. Otherwise he scaled back his conducting commitments to concentrate on IRCAM. Most of his appearances during this period were with his own Ensemble intercontemporain—including tours to the United States (1986), Australia (1988), the Soviet Union (1990) and Canada (1991)—although he also renewed his links in the 1980s with the Los Angeles Philharmonic Orchestra.

Boulez composed significantly more during this period, producing a series of pieces which used the potential, developed at IRCAM, electronically to transform sound in real time. The first of these was Répons (1981–1984), a 40-minute work for soloists, ensemble and electronics. He also radically reworked earlier pieces, including Notations I-IV, a transcription and expansion for large orchestra of tiny piano pieces (1945–1980), and his cantata on poems by Char, Le Visage nuptial (1946–1989).

From 1976 to 1995, he held the Chair in Invention, technique et langage en musique at the Collège de France. In 1988 he made a series of six programmes for French television, Boulez XXe siècle, each of which focused on a specific aspect of contemporary music (rhythm, timbre, form etc.)

=== 1992–2006: Return to conducting ===
In 1992, Boulez gave up the directorship of IRCAM and was succeeded by Laurent Bayle. He was composer in residence at that year's Salzburg Festival. The previous year he began a series of annual residencies with the Cleveland Orchestra and the Chicago Symphony Orchestra. In 1995 he was named principal guest conductor in Chicago, a post he held until 2005, when he became conductor emeritus. His 70th birthday in 1995 was marked by a six-month retrospective tour with the London Symphony Orchestra, taking in Paris, Vienna, New York and Tokyo. In 2001 he conducted a major Bartók cycle with the Orchestre de Paris.

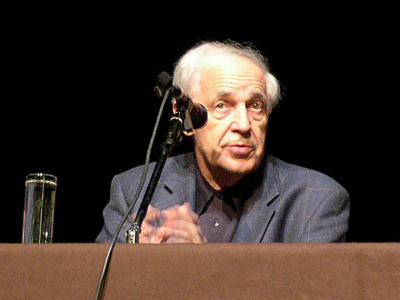
Boulez at a conference at the Palais des Beaux-Arts in Brussels in 2004

This period also marked a return to the opera house, including two productions with Peter Stein: Debussy's Pelléas et Mélisande (1992, Welsh National Opera and Théâtre du Châtelet, Paris); and Schoenberg's Moses und Aron (1995, Dutch National Opera and Salzburg Festival). In 2004 and 2005 he returned to Bayreuth to conduct a controversial new production of Parsifal directed by Christoph Schlingensief.

His two most substantial compositions from this period are ...explosante-fixe... (1993), which had its origins in 1972 as a tribute to Stravinsky and which again used the electronic resources of IRCAM, and sur Incises (1998), for which he was awarded the 2001 Grawemeyer Award for Music Composition.

Boulez continued to work on institutional organisation. He co-founded the Cité de la musique, which opened in La Villette on the outskirts of Paris in 1995. Consisting of a modular concert hall, museum and mediatheque—with the Conservatoire de Paris on an adjacent site—it became the home to the Ensemble intercontemporain and attracted a diverse audience. In 2004, he co-founded the Lucerne Festival Academy, an orchestral institute for young musicians, dedicated to music of the twentieth and twenty-first centuries. For the next ten years he spent the last three weeks of summer working with young composers and conducting concerts with the academy's orchestra.

=== 2006–2016: Last years ===
Boulez's last major work was Dérive 2 (2006), a 45-minute piece for eleven instruments. He left several compositional projects unfinished, including the remaining Notations for orchestra.

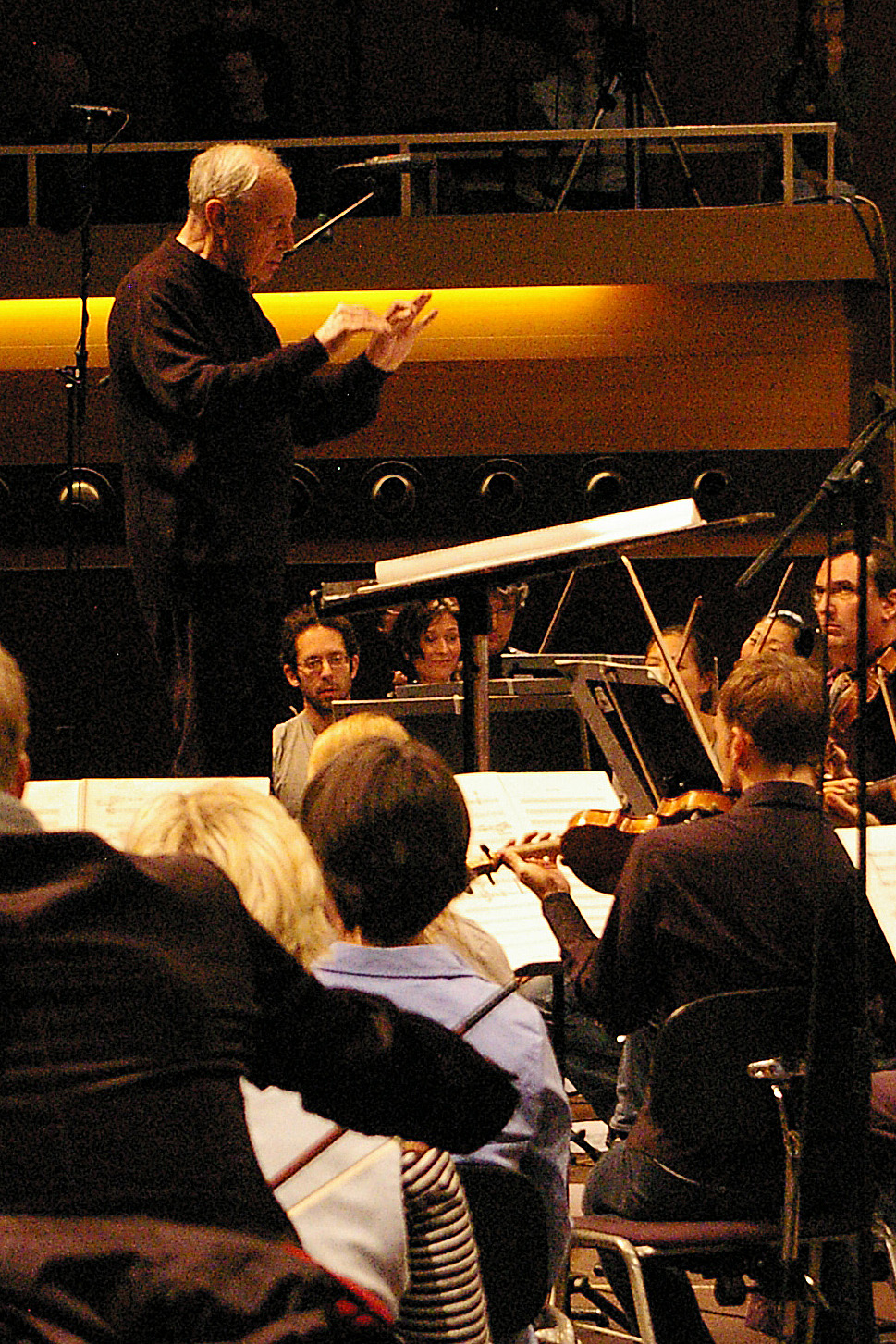
Boulez at the Donaueschinger Musiktage 2008 with the SWR Sinfonieorchester

He remained active as a conductor over the next six years. In 2007 he was re-united with Chéreau for a production of Janáček's From the House of the Dead (Theater an der Wien, Amsterdam and Aix). In April that year, as part of the Festtage in Berlin, Boulez and Daniel Barenboim gave a cycle of the Mahler symphonies with the Staatskapelle Berlin, which they repeated two years later at Carnegie Hall. In late 2007 the Orchestre de Paris and the Ensemble intercontemporain presented a retrospective of Boulez's music and in 2008 the Louvre mounted the exhibition Pierre Boulez, Œuvre: fragment.

His appearances became more infrequent after an eye operation in 2010 left him with severely impaired sight. Other health problems included a shoulder injury resulting from a fall. In late 2011, when he was already quite frail, he led the combined Ensemble intercontemporain and Lucerne Festival Academy, with the soprano Barbara Hannigan, in a tour of six European cities of his own Pli selon pli. His final appearance as a conductor was in Salzburg on 28 January 2012 with the Vienna Philharmonic Orchestra and Mitsuko Uchida in a programme of Schoenberg (Begleitungsmusik zu einer Lichtspielscene and the Piano Concerto), Mozart (Piano Concerto No.19 in F major K459) and Stravinsky (Pulcinella Suite). Thereafter he cancelled all conducting engagements.

In mid-2012 Boulez was diagnosed with a neurodegenerative disease, probably a form of Parkinson's. Later that year, he worked with the Diotima Quartet, making final revisions to his only string quartet, Livre pour quatuor, begun in 1948. In 2013 he oversaw the release on Deutsche Grammophon of Pierre Boulez: Complete Works, a 13-CD survey of all his authorised compositions. He made his last public appearance on 30 May 2013 at the Théâtre des Champs-Élysées in Paris, discussing Stravinsky with Robert Piencikowski, to mark the centenary of the premiere of The Rite of Spring.

From 2014 he scarcely left his home in Baden-Baden. His health prevented him from taking part in the many celebrations held across the world for his 90th birthday in 2015, which included a multi-media exhibition at the Musée de la Musique in Paris, focusing on the inspiration he had drawn from literature and the visual arts.

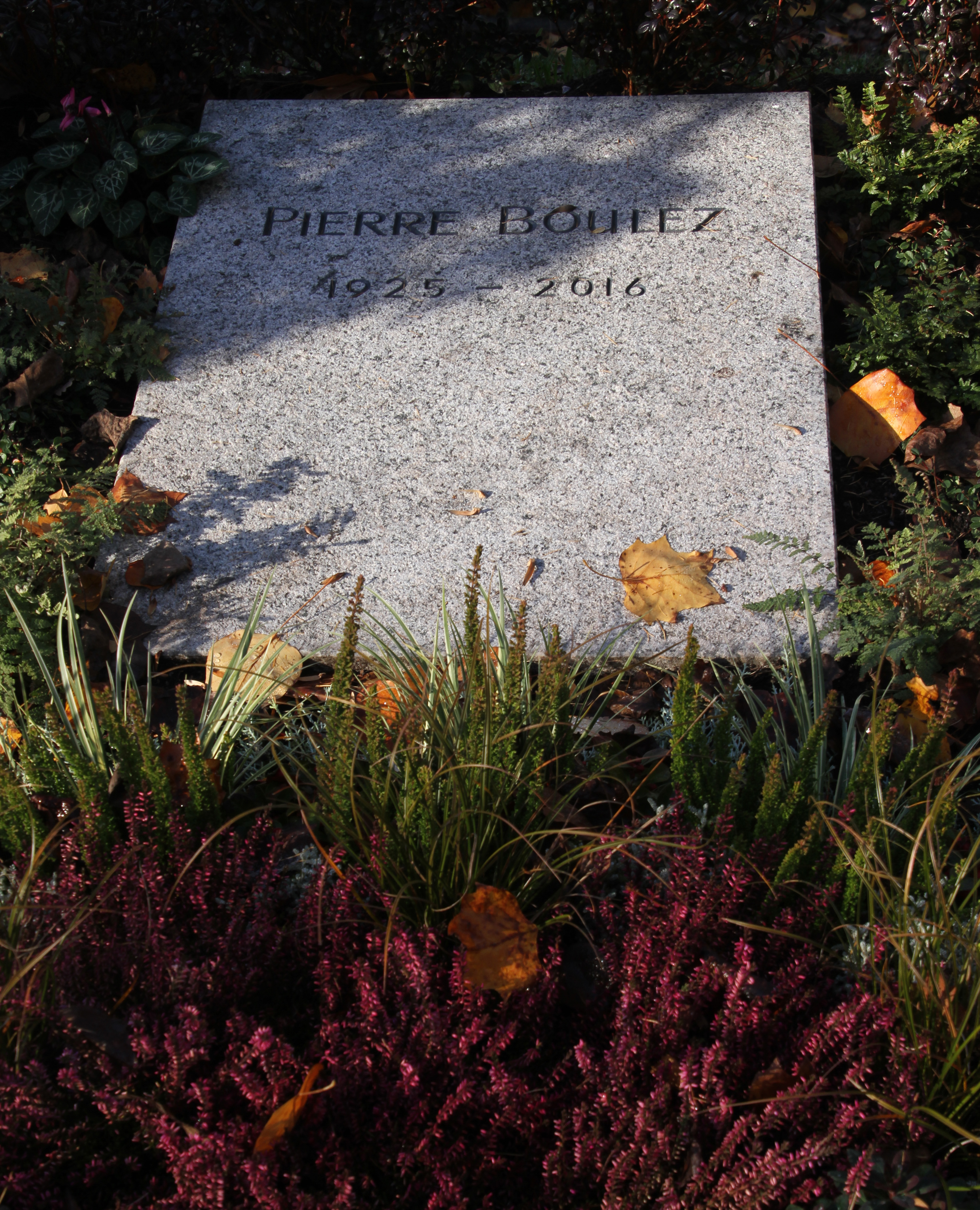
Boulez's grave in Baden-Baden, 28 November 2016

Boulez died at home on 5 January 2016. He was buried on 13 January in Baden-Baden's main cemetery following a private funeral service at the town's Stiftskirche. At a memorial service the next day at the Saint-Sulpice in Paris, eulogists included Barenboim, Renzo Piano, and Laurent Bayle, then president of the Philharmonie de Paris, whose large concert hall had been inaugurated the previous year, thanks in part to Boulez's influence.

== Compositions ==
=== Juvenilia and student works ===
Boulez's earliest surviving compositions date from his school days in 1942–43, mostly songs on texts by Baudelaire, Gautier and Rilke. Gerald Bennett describes the pieces as "modest, delicate and rather anonymous [employing] a certain number of standard elements of French salon music of the time—whole-tone scales, pentatonic scales and polytonality".

As a student at the Conservatoire Boulez composed a series of pieces influenced first by Honegger and Jolivet (Prelude, Toccata and Scherzo and Nocturne for solo piano (1944–45)) and then by Messiaen (Trois psalmodies for piano (1945) and a Quartet for four ondes Martenot (1945–46)). The encounter with Schoenberg—through his studies with Leibowitz—was the catalyst for his first piece of serial music, the Thème et variations for piano, left hand (1945). Peter O'Hagan describes it as "his boldest and most ambitious work to date".

=== Douze notations and the work in progress ===
Boulez completed Douze notations in December 1945. It is in these twelve aphoristic pieces for piano, each twelve bars long, that Bennett first detects the influence of Webern. Shortly after the composition of the piano original, Boulez attempted an (unperformed and unpublished) orchestration of eleven of the pieces. Over a decade later he re-used two of them (Note: Nos. 5 and 9.) in instrumental interludes in his Improvisation I sur Mallarmé. Then in the mid-1970s he embarked on a further, more radical transformation of the Notations into extended works for very large orchestra, a project which occupied him to the end of his life.

Notations was only the most extreme example of Boulez's tendency to revisit earlier works: "as long as my ideas have not exhausted every possibility of proliferation they stay in my mind". Robert Piencikowski characterises this in part as "an obsessional concern for perfection" and observes that with some pieces "one could speak of successive distinct versions, each one presenting a particular state of the musical material, without the successor invalidating the previous one or vice versa"—although he notes that Boulez almost invariably vetoed the performance of previous versions.

=== First published works ===
The Sonatine for flute and piano (1946–1949) was the first work Boulez allowed to be published. A serial work of great energy, its single-movement form was influenced by Schoenberg's Chamber Symphony No. 1. Bennett finds in the piece a tone new to Boulez's writing: "a sharp, brittle violence juxtaposed against an extreme sensitivity and delicacy". In the Piano Sonata No. 1 (1946–49) the biographer Dominique Jameux highlights the sheer number of different kinds of attack in its two short movements—and the frequent accelerations of tempo in the second movement—which together create a feeling of "instrumental delirium".

There followed two cantatas based on the poetry of René Char. Of Le Visage nuptial Paul Griffiths observes that "Char's five poems speak in hard-edged surrealist imagery of an ecstatic sexual passion", which Boulez reflected in music "on the borders of fevered hysteria". In its original version (1946–47) the piece was scored for small forces (soprano, contralto, two ondes Martenot, piano and percussion). Forty years later Boulez arrived at the definitive version for soprano, mezzo-soprano, chorus and orchestra (1985–1989). Le Soleil des eaux (1948) originated in incidental music for a radio drama by Char. It went through three further versions before reaching its final form in 1965 as a piece for soprano, mixed chorus and orchestra. The first movement (Complainte du lézard amoureux (Note: Lament of the Lovesick Lizard.)) is a love song addressed by a lizard to a goldfinch in the heat of a summer day; the second (La Sorgue) is a violent, incantatory protest against the pollution of the river Sorgue.

The Second Piano Sonata (1947–48) is a half-hour work which requires formidable technical prowess from the performer. Its four movements follow the standard pattern of a classical sonata but in each of them Boulez subverts the traditional model. For Griffiths the violent character of much of the music "is not just superficial: it is expressive of … a need to obliterate what had gone before". Boulez played the work for Aaron Copland, who asked: "But must we start a revolution all over again?"—"Yes, mercilessly", Boulez replied.

=== Total serialism ===
That revolution entered its most extreme phase in 1950–1952, when Boulez developed a technique in which not only pitch but other musical parameters—duration, dynamics, timbre and attack—were organised according to serial principles, an approach known as total serialism or punctualism. Messiaen had already made an experiment in this direction in his Mode de valeurs et d'intensités (Note: Mode of Duration and Dynamics.) for piano (1949). Boulez's first sketches towards total serialism appeared in parts of Livre pour quatuor (Note: Book for Quartet.) (1948–49, revised 2011–12), a collection of movements for string quartet from which the players may choose at any one performance, foreshadowing Boulez's later interest in variable form.

In the early 1950s Boulez began to apply the technique rigorously, ordering each parameter into sets of twelve and prescribing no repetition until all twelve had sounded. According to the music critic Alex Ross the resulting surfeit of ever-changing musical data has the effect of erasing at any given point previous impressions the listener may have formed: "the present moment is all there is", Ross observed. Boulez linked this development to a desire by his generation to create a tabula rasa after the war.

His works in this idiom are Polyphonie X (1950–51; withdrawn) for 18 instruments, the two musique concrète études (1951–52; withdrawn), and Structures, Book I for two pianos (1951–52). Speaking of Structures, Book I in 2011 Boulez described it as a piece in which "the responsibility of the composer is practically absent. Had computers existed at that time I would have put the data through them and made the piece that way. But I did it by hand...It was a demonstration through the absurd." Asked whether it should still be listened to as music, Boulez replied: "I am not terribly eager to listen to it. But for me it was an experiment that was absolutely necessary."

=== Le Marteau sans maître and Pli selon pli ===
Structures, Book I was a turning point for Boulez; from here on he loosened the strictness of total serialism into a more supple, gestural music: "I am trying to rid myself of my thumbprints and taboos", he wrote to Cage. The most significant result of this new freedom was Le Marteau sans maître (1953–1955), described by Griffiths and Bill Hopkins as a "keystone of twentieth-century music". Three short poems by Char are the starting-point for three interlocking cycles. Four movements are vocal settings of the poems (one is set twice), the other five are instrumental commentaries. According to Hopkins and Griffiths the music is characterised by abrupt tempo transitions, passages of broadly improvisatory melodic style and exotic instrumental colouring. The piece is scored for contralto soloist with alto flute, xylorimba, vibraphone, percussion, guitar and viola. Boulez said that the choice of these instruments showed the influence of non-European cultures, to which he had always been attracted.

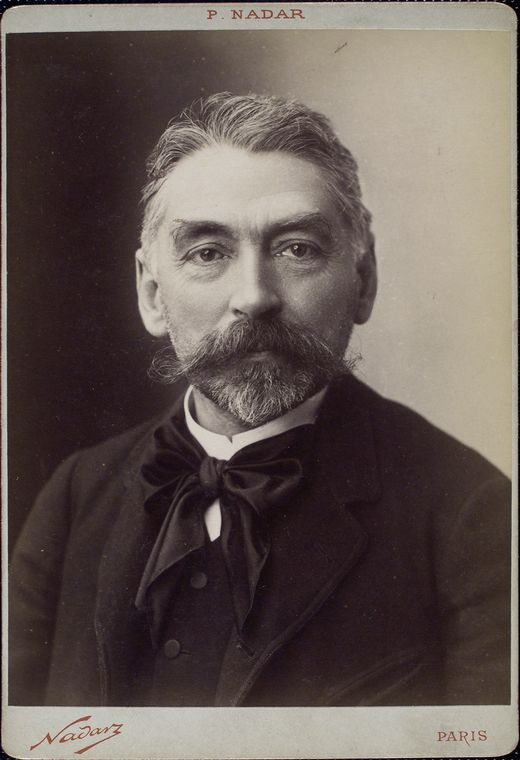
Stéphane Mallarmé

For the text of his next major work, Pli selon pli (1957–1989), Boulez turned to the symbolist poetry of Stéphane Mallarmé, attracted by its extreme density and radical syntax. At seventy minutes, it is his longest composition. Three Improvisations on individual sonnets are framed by two orchestral movements, into which fragments of other poems are embedded. Boulez's word-setting, which in the first Improvisation is straightforwardly syllabic, becomes ever more melismatic, to the point where the words cannot be distinguished. Boulez's stated aim was to make the sonnets become the music at a deeper, structural level. The piece is scored for soprano and large orchestra, often deployed in chamber groups. Boulez described its sound-world, rich in percussion, as "not so much frozen as extraordinarily 'vitrified'". The work had a complex genesis, reaching its definitive form in 1989.

=== Controlled chance ===
From the 1950s Boulez experimented with what he called "controlled chance". In his article "Sonate, que me veux-tu?" (Note: What do you want from me, sonata?), he wrote of "the investigation of a relative world, a permanent 'discovering' rather like the state of 'permanent revolution'".

Peyser observes that Boulez's use of chance is different from John Cage's. In Cage's music the performers are often free to create unforeseen sounds, with the aim of removing the composer's intention from the music; in Boulez's music they choose between possibilities that have been written out by the composer. When applied to the order of sections, this is sometimes described as "mobile form", a technique devised by Earle Brown, who was inspired by the mobile sculptures of Alexander Calder, whom Boulez met when he was visiting New York in 1952.

Boulez employed variants of the technique in several works over the next two decades: in the Third Piano Sonata (1955–1957, revised 1963) the pianist chooses different routes through the score and in one movement (Trope) has the option of omitting certain passages altogether; in Éclat (1965), the conductor triggers the order in which each player joins the ensemble; in Domaines (1961–1968) it is the soloist who dictates the order in which the sections are played by his movement around the stage. In later works, such as Cummings ist der Dichter (Note: Cummings is the Poet.) (1970, revised 1986)—a chamber cantata for 16 solo voices and small orchestra using a poem by E. E. Cummings—the conductor chooses the order of certain events but there is no freedom for the individual player. In its original version Pli selon pli also contained elements of choice for the instrumentalists, but much of this was eliminated in later revisions.

By contrast Figures—Doubles—Prismes (1957–1968) is a fixed work with no chance element. Piencikowski describes it as "a great cycle of variations whose components interpenetrate each other instead of remaining isolated in the traditional manner". It is notable for the unusual layout of the orchestra, in which the various families of instruments (woodwind, brass etc.) are scattered across the stage rather than being grouped together.

=== Middle-period works ===
Jonathan Goldman identifies a major aesthetic shift in Boulez's work from the mid-1970s onwards, characterised variously by the presence of thematic writing, a return to vertical harmony and to clarity and legibility of form. Boulez himself said: "the envelope is simpler. The contents are not ... I think in my recent work it is true that the first approach is more direct, and the gesture is more obvious, let's say."

For Goldman, Rituel in memoriam Bruno Maderna (1974–75) marks the beginning of this development. Boulez wrote this twenty-five minute work as an epitaph for his friend and colleague, the Italian composer and conductor, who died in 1973 aged 53. The piece is divided into fifteen sections, the orchestra into eight groups. The odd-numbered sections are conducted; in the even-numbered sections the conductor merely sets each group in motion and its progress is regulated by a percussionist beating time. In his dedication Boulez described the work as "a ritual of disappearance and survival"; Griffiths refers to the work's "awesome grandeur".

Notations I–IV (1980) are the first four transformations of piano miniatures from 1945 into pieces for very large orchestra. In his review of the New York premiere, Andrew Porter wrote that the single idea of each original piece "has, as it were, been passed through a many-faceted bright prism and broken into a thousand linked, lapped, sparkling fragments", the finale "a terse modern Rite ... which sets the pulses racing".

Dérive 1 (Note: Explaining the title in a letter to Glock, Boulez referred to the fact that the music "derived" from material in Répons but also that one meaning of "dérive" is the drifting of a boat in the wind or current.) (1984), dedicated to William Glock on his retirement from the Bath Festival, is a short quintet in which the piano takes the lead. The material is derived from six chords and, according to Ivan Hewett, the piece "shuffles and decorates these chords, bursting outwards in spirals and eddies, before returning to its starting point". At the end the music "shivers into silence".

=== Works with electronics ===
Boulez compared the experience of listening to pre-recorded electronic music in the concert hall to a crematorium ceremony. His real interest lay in the instantaneous transformation of instrumental sounds but the technology was not available until the founding of IRCAM in the 1970s. Before then he had produced Deux Études (1951) for magnetic tape for Pierre Schaeffer's Groupe Recherche de la Radiodiffusion Française, as well as a large-scale piece for live orchestra with tape, Poésie pour pouvoir (1958). He was dissatisfied with both pieces and withdrew them.

The first piece completed at IRCAM was Répons (1980–1984). (Note: The title is a reference to plainchant, in which the solo singer alternates with a choir. It reflects the interplay between the soloists and the ensemble (or, as Samuel puts it: the individual and the community).) In this forty-minute work an instrumental group is placed in the middle of the hall, while six soloists surround the audience: two pianos, harp, cimbalom, vibraphone and glockenspiel/xylophone. It is their music which is transformed electronically and projected through the space. Peter Heyworth described the moment when they enter, some ten minutes into the piece: "it is as though a great window were thrown open, through which a new sound world enters, and with it a new world of the imagination. Even more impressive is the fact that there is no longer a schism between the worlds of natural and electronic sounds, but rather a continuous spectrum."

Dialogue de l'ombre double (1982–1985) (Note: Dialogue of the Double Shadow. The title refers to a scene in Paul Claudel's play Le Soulier de satin (The Satin Slipper). Boulez acknowledged that the work had a theatrical aspect.) for clarinet and electronics grew out of a fragment of Domaines and was a gift for Luciano Berio on his 60th birthday. Lasting around eighteen minutes, it is a dialogue between a solo clarinet (played live, though sometimes reverberated through an offstage piano) and its double (in passages pre-recorded by the same musician and projected around the hall). Boulez approved transcriptions of the piece for bassoon, saxophone, alto flute and recorder.

In the early 1970s he had worked on an extended chamber piece called …explosante-fixe… (Note: The title of the work is a quotation from André Breton's L'Amour fou: "convulsive beauty will be erotic-veiled, exploding-fixed, magic-circumstantial, or it will not be.") for eight solo instruments, electronically transformed by a machine called a halophone, but the technology was primitive and he eventually withdrew it. He re-used some of its material in other works, including a later piece with the same name. This definitive version was composed at IRCAM between 1991 and 1993 for MIDI-flute and two accompanying flutes with ensemble and live electronics. By this time the computer could follow the score and respond to triggers from the players. According to Griffiths, "the principal flute is caught as if in a hall of mirrors, its line imitated in what the other flutes play, and then in the contributions of the larger ensemble". Hopkins and Griffiths describe it as "music characteristically caught between thrill and desperation".

Anthèmes II for violin and electronics (1997) grew out of a piece for solo violin Anthèmes I (1991), which Boulez wrote for the Yehudi Menuhin Violin Competition in Paris and which in turn derived from material in the original …explosante-fixe… The virtuoso writing for the instrument is captured by the electronic system, transformed in real time and propelled around the space to create what Jonathan Goldman calls a "hyper-violin". Although this produces effects of speed and complexity which no violinist could achieve, Boulez restricts the palette of electronic sounds so that their source, the violin, is always recognisable.

=== Last works ===
In later works Boulez relinquished electronics, although Griffiths suggests that in sur Incises (1996–1998) (Note: The title refers to the fact that the piece elaborates "on" the piano piece Incises.) the choice of like but distinct instruments, spread across the platform, enabled Boulez to create effects of harmonic, timbral and spatial echo for which he previously used electronic means. The piece is scored for three pianos, three harps and three percussionists (including steel drums) and grew out of Incises (1993–2001), a short piece written for a piano competition. In an interview in 2013 he described it as his most important work—"because it is the freest".

Notation VII (1999), marked "hieratic" in the score, is the longest of the orchestral Notations. According to Griffiths: "what was abrupt in 1945 is now languorous; what was crude is now done with a lifetime's experience and expertise; what was simple is fantastically embellished, even submerged."

Dérive 2 started out in 1988 as a five-minute piece, dedicated to Elliott Carter on his 80th birthday; by 2006 it was a 45-minute work for eleven instruments and Boulez's last major composition. According to Claude Samuel, Boulez wanted to explore rhythmic shifts, tempo changes and superimpositions of different speeds, inspired in part by his contact with the music of György Ligeti. Boulez described it as "a sort of narrative mosaic".

=== Unfinished works ===
Boulez's unfinished works include several that he was actively progressing, and others which he put to one side despite their potential for further development. In the latter category, the archives contain three unpublished movements of the Third Piano Sonata and further sections of Éclat/Multiples which, if performed, would practically double its length.

As for works Boulez was working on in his later years, partial drafts in short score of three further orchestral Notations were found among his papers after his death, of which the most advanced were Notations VI (59 pages) and V (41 pages). According to Alain Galliari, they are highly developed in terms of notes and rhythm, but with no more than a few indications of orchestration, and no tempi, dynamics, articulation or phrasing.

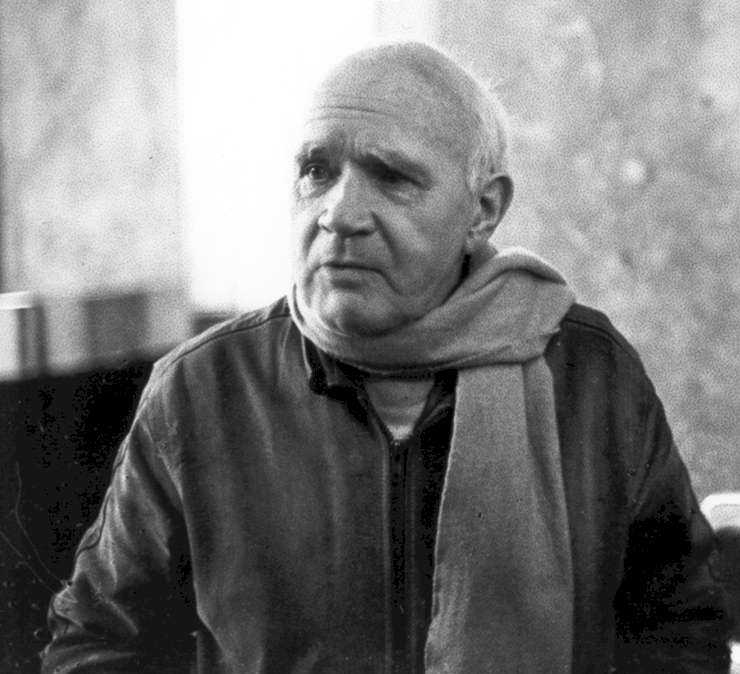
Jean Genet, 1983

From the mid-1960s, Boulez also spoke of composing an opera. In the 1960s he exchanged ideas with the radical French playwright and novelist Jean Genet about a work whose subject would be treason. In the 1980s he discussed with Patrice Chéreau an adaptation of Genet's play Les Paravents (The Screens). The German playwright Heiner Müller was working on a version of Aeschylus's Oresteia for Boulez when he died in 1995. In a 1996 interview Boulez said that he was thinking of Edward Bond's The War Plays or Lear, "but only thinking". When news emerged in 2010 that, at the age of 85, he was working on an opera based on Beckett's Waiting for Godot, few believed such an ambitious undertaking could be realised so late in the day. When Boulez's manuscripts were catalogued after his death, it emerged that not a note of any of these projects had been written.

== Conducting ==
=== Approach to conducting ===
Boulez was one of the leading conductors of the second half of the twentieth century. In a career lasting more than sixty years he directed most of the world's major orchestras. He was entirely self-taught, although he said that he learnt a great deal from attending Désormière's and Hans Rosbaud's rehearsals. He also cited George Szell as an influential mentor.

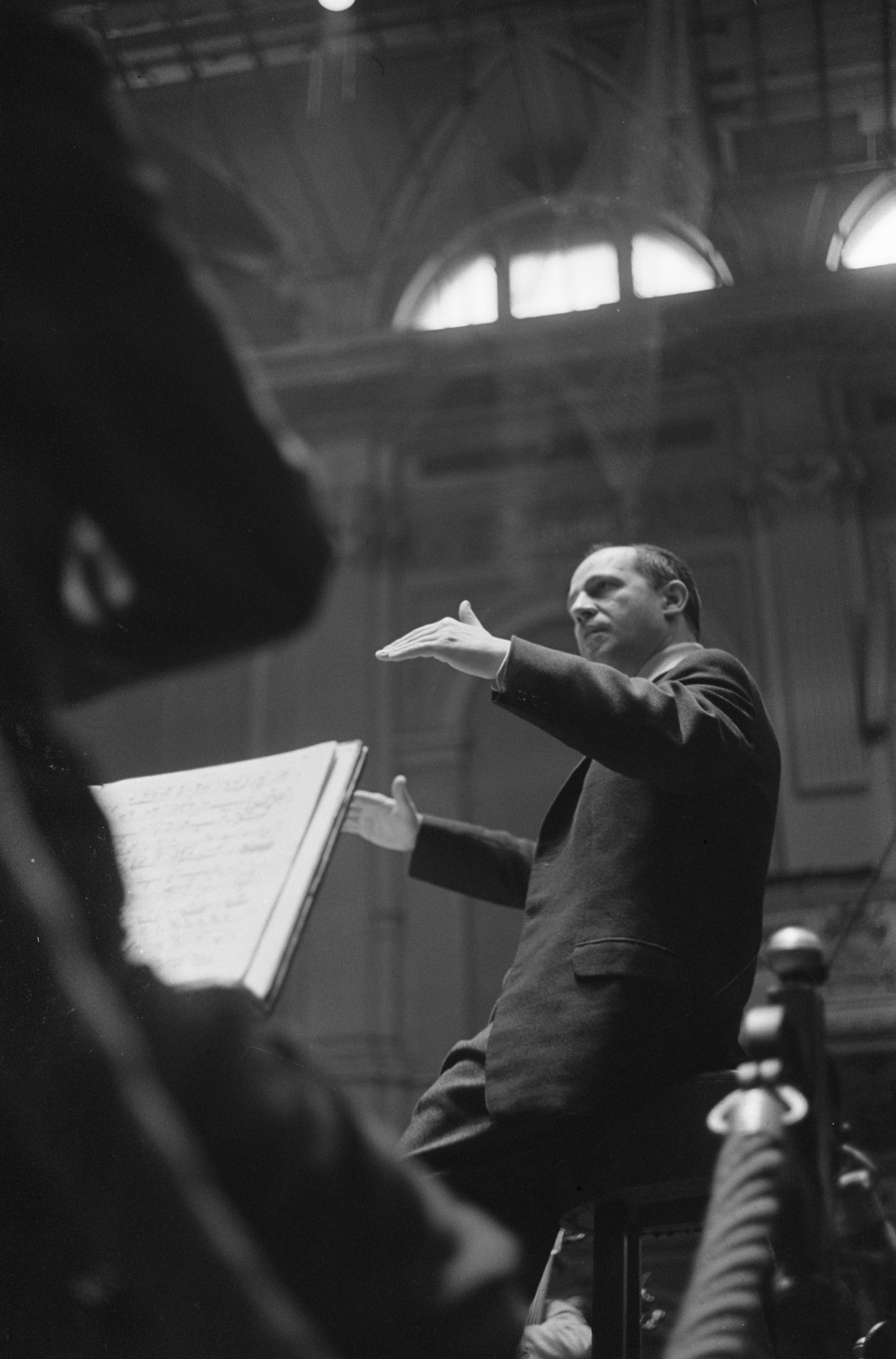
Boulez conducting at Concertgebouw, Amsterdam, in 1963

Boulez gave several reasons for conducting as much as he did. He gave his first concerts for the Domaine musical because its financial resources were limited: "I told myself that, being much less expensive, I would have a go myself." He also said that the best possible training for a composer was "to have to play or conduct his own works and to face their difficulties of execution"—yet on a practical level he sometimes struggled to find time to compose given his conducting commitments. The writer and pianist Susan Bradshaw thought this was deliberate and related to a sense of being overshadowed as a composer by Stockhausen, who from the late 1950s was increasingly prolific. The French litterateur and musicologist Pierre Souvchinsky disagreed: "Boulez became a conductor because he had a great gift for it."

Not everyone agreed about the greatness of that gift. According to writer Hans Keller: "Boulez cannot phrase—it is as simple as that...the reason being that he ignores the harmonic implications of any structure he is dealing with, to the extent of utterly disregarding harmonic rhythm and hence all characteristic rhythm in tonal music..." Joan Peyser considered that: "in general Boulez conducts what he loves magnificently, conducts what he likes very well and, with rare exceptions, gives stiff performances of the classic and romantic repertoire". The conductor Otto Klemperer described him as "without doubt the only man of his generation who is an outstanding conductor and musician".

He worked with many leading soloists and had particularly long-term collaborations with Daniel Barenboim and with the soprano Jessye Norman.

According to Peter Heyworth, Boulez produced a lean, athletic sound which, underpinned by his rhythmic exactitude, could generate an electric sense of excitement. The ability to reveal the structure of a score and to clarify dense orchestral textures were hallmarks of his conducting. He conducted without a baton and, as Heyworth observed: "there is no trace of theatre—not even the rather theatrical sort of economy that was practised by Richard Strauss". According to Boulez: "outward excitement uses up inner excitement".

Boulez's ear for sound was legendary: "there are countless stories of him detecting, for example, faulty intonation from the third oboe in a complex orchestral texture", Paul Griffiths wrote in The New York Times. Oliver Knussen, himself a well-known composer-conductor, observed that "his rehearsals are models of clear-headedness and professional courtesy—he effortlessly commands respect".

=== Work in the opera house ===
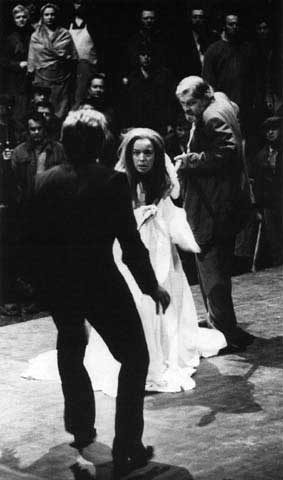
The 1976 centenary production of Der Ring des Nibelungen at the Bayreuth Festival, conducted by Boulez

Boulez also conducted in the opera house. His chosen repertoire was small and included no Italian opera. Apart from Wagner, he conducted only twentieth-century works. Of his work with Wieland Wagner on Wozzeck and Parsifal, Boulez said: "I would willingly have hitched, if not my entire fate, then at least a part of it, to someone like him, for [our] discussions about music and productions were thrilling." They planned other productions together, including Richard Strauss's Salome and Elektra, Mussorgsky's Boris Godunov and Mozart's Don Giovanni. However, by the time rehearsals for their Bayreuth Parsifal began Wieland was already gravely ill and he died in October 1966.

When the Frankfurt Wozzeck was revived after Wieland's death, Boulez was deeply disillusioned by the working conditions: "there was no rehearsal, no care taken over anything. The cynicism of the way an opera house like that was run disgusted me. It still disgusts me." He later said that it was this experience which prompted his notorious remarks in an interview the following year in Der Spiegel, in which he claimed that "no opera worth mentioning had been composed since 1935", that "a Beatles record is certainly cleverer (and shorter) than a Henze opera" and that "the most elegant" solution to opera's moribund condition would be "to blow the opera houses up".

In 1967, Boulez, theatre director Jean Vilar and choreographer Maurice Béjart were asked to devise a scheme for the reform of the Paris Opéra, with a view to Boulez becoming its music director. Their plan was derailed by the political fallout from the 1968 student protests. However Bejart used Boulez's music in his ballet "Improvisation sur Mallarme III" in 1973. In the mid-1980s, Boulez became vice president of the planned Opéra Bastille in Paris, working with Daniel Barenboim, who was to be its music director. In 1988 Pierre Bergé was appointed president of the Bastille opera. He dismissed Barenboim and Boulez withdrew in solidarity.

Boulez conducted only specific projects—in productions by leading stage directors—when he could be satisfied that conditions were right. Thanks to his years with the Renaud-Barrault company, the theatrical dimension was as important to him as the musical and he always attended staging rehearsals.

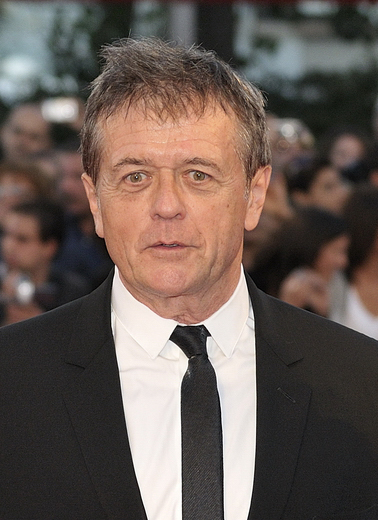
Patrice Chéreau

For the centenary Ring in Bayreuth, Boulez originally asked Ingmar Bergman then Peter Brook to direct, both of whom refused. Peter Stein initially agreed but withdrew in 1974. Patrice Chéreau, who was primarily a theatre director, accepted and went on to create one of the defining opera productions of modern times. According to Allan Kozinn the production "helped open the floodgates of directorial reinterpretation of opera" (sometimes known as Regietheater). Chéreau treated the story in part as an allegory of capitalism, drawing on ideas that George Bernard Shaw explored in The Perfect Wagnerite in 1898, and using imagery from the Industrial Age; he achieved an exceptional degree of naturalism in the singers' performances. Boulez's conducting was no less controversial, emphasising continuity, flexibility and transparency over mythic grandeur and weight. In its first year the production met with hostility from the largely conservative audience, and around thirty orchestral musicians refused to work with Boulez in subsequent seasons. Both production and musical realisation grew in stature over the following four years and after the final performance in 1980 there was a 90-minute ovation.

=== Recording ===
Boulez's first recordings date from his time with the Domaine musical in the late 1950s and early 1960s and were made for the French Vega label. They include the first of his five recordings of Le Marteau sans maître (with contralto Marie-Thérèse Cahn), as well as pieces to which he did not return in the studio (such as Stravinsky's Renard and Stockhausen's Zeitmaße). In 2015 Universal Music brought these recordings together in a 10-CD set.

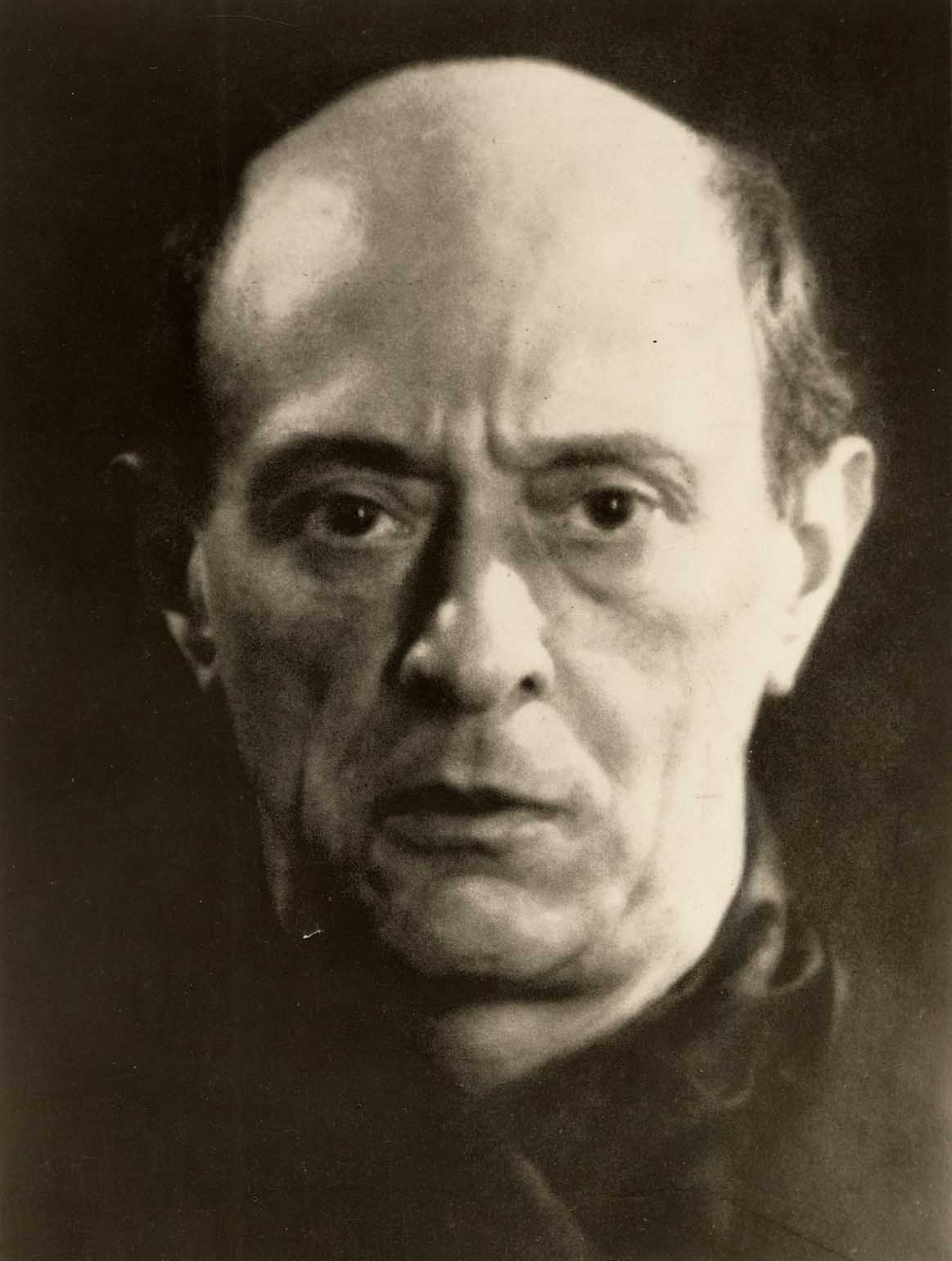
Arnold Schoenberg (1927) by Man Ray

Between 1966 and 1989 he recorded for Columbia Records (later Sony Classical). Among the first projects were the Paris Wozzeck (with Walter Berry) and the Covent Garden Pelléas et Mélisande (with George Shirley and Elisabeth Söderström). He made a highly praised recording of The Rite of Spring with the Cleveland Orchestra and supervised a Webern edition, consisting of all the works with opus numbers. He also produced a wide-ranging survey of the music of Schoenberg with the BBC Symphony Orchestra, and recorded the orchestral works of Ravel with the New York Philharmonic and the Cleveland Orchestra. As for Boulez's own music, in 1969 he made the first recording of Pli selon pli (with Halina Łukomska as soprano soloist) and recordings of Rituel and Éclat/Multiples. In 2014 Sony Classical issued Pierre Boulez—The Complete Columbia Album Collection on 67 CDs.

Three operatic projects from this period were picked up by other labels: the Bayreuth Ring was released on video and LP by Philips; the Bayreuth Parsifal and Paris Lulu were recorded for Deutsche Grammophon. For EMI in 1984 he recorded several pieces on Frank Zappa's album The Perfect Stranger with the Ensemble intercontemporain.

In the 1980s, Boulez also recorded for the Erato label, mostly with the Ensemble intercontemporain, with a greater emphasis on the music of his contemporaries such as Berio, Ligeti and Carter, as well as a survey of some of his own music, including Le Visage nuptial, Le Soleil des eaux and Figures—Doubles—Prismes. In 2015 Erato issued Pierre Boulez—The Complete Erato Recordings on 14 CDs.

From 1991 onwards, Boulez recorded under an exclusive contract with Deutsche Grammophon. It centred on the orchestras of Chicago and Cleveland in the United States and Vienna and Berlin in Europe. He re-recorded much of his core repertoire and oversaw a second Webern edition, including the unpublished works. His own late music featured prominently, including Répons, ...explosante-fixe... and sur Incises. The most significant addition to his recorded repertoire was the multi-orchestra cycle of the Mahler symphonies and vocal works with orchestra. An 88-disc set of all Boulez's recordings for Deutsche Grammophon, Philips and Decca was issued in 2022.

Many hundreds of concerts conducted by Boulez are held in the archives of radio stations and orchestras. In 2005 the Chicago Symphony Orchestra released a 2-CD set of broadcasts by Boulez, focusing on works which he had not recorded commercially, including Janáček's Glagolitic Mass and Messiaen's L'Ascension.

== Writing and teaching ==
According to Jean-Jacques Nattiez, Boulez was one of two twentieth-century composers who wrote most prolifically about music, the other being Schoenberg. It was with a 1952 article with the inflammatory title "Schoenberg is Dead", published in the British journal The Score shortly after the older composer's death, that Boulez first attracted international attention as a writer. This highly polemical piece, in which he attacked Schoenberg for his conservatism, contrasting it with Webern's radicalism, caused widespread controversy.

Jonathan Goldman points out that, over the decades, Boulez's writings addressed very different readerships: in the 1950s the cultured Parisian attendees of the Domaine musical; in the 1960s the specialised avant-garde composers and performers of the Darmstadt and Basel courses; and, between 1976 and 1995, the highly literate but non-specialist audience of the lectures he gave as Professor of the Collège de France. Much of Boulez's writing was linked to specific occasions, whether a first performance of a new piece, notes for a recording or a eulogy for a lost colleague. Generally he avoided publishing detailed analyses, other than one of The Rite of Spring. As Nattiez points out: "as a writer Boulez is a communicator of ideas rather than of technical information. This may sometimes prove disappointing to composition students, but it is no doubt a peculiarity of his writing that explains its popularity with non-musicians."

Boulez's writings have appeared in English as Stocktakings from an Apprenticeship, Boulez on Music Today, Orientations: Collected Writings and Pierre Boulez, Music Lessons: The Complete Collège de France Lectures. Throughout his career he also expressed himself through long-form interviews, of which perhaps the most substantial are those with Antoine Goléa (1958), Célestin Deliège (1975) and Jean Vermeil (1989). Two volumes of correspondence have been published: with the composer John Cage (from the period 1949–62); and with the anthropologist and ethnomusicologist André Schaeffner (from 1954 to 1970).

Boulez taught at the Darmstadt Summer School most years between 1954 and 1965. He was professor of composition at the Basel Music Academy in Switzerland (1960–63) and a visiting lecturer at Harvard University in 1963. He also taught privately in the early part of his career. Students included the composers Richard Rodney Bennett, Jean-Claude Éloy and Heinz Holliger.

== Character and personal life ==
As a young man Boulez was an explosive, often confrontational figure. Jean-Louis Barrault, who knew him in his twenties, caught the contradictions in his personality: "his powerful aggressiveness was a sign of creative passion, a particular blend of intransigence and humour, the way his moods of affection and insolence succeeded one another, all these had drawn us near to him". Messiaen said later: "He was in revolt against everything." At one point Boulez turned against Messiaen, describing his Trois petites liturgies de la présence divine as "brothel music" and saying that the Turangalîla-Symphonie made him vomit. It was five years before relations were restored.

In a 2000 article in The New Yorker, Alex Ross described Boulez as a bully. Boulez did not disagree: "Certainly I was a bully. I'm not ashamed of it at all. The hostility of the establishment to what you were able to do in the Forties and Fifties was very strong. Sometimes you have to fight against your society." One of the most notorious instances of this is Boulez's declaration in 1952 that "any musician who has not experienced‍—‌I do not say understood, but truly experienced‍—‌the necessity of dodecaphonic music is USELESS. For his whole work is irrelevant to the needs of his epoch." (Note: An article published shortly after Boulez's death in The Guardian quotes many of Boulez's more provocative statements.)

Those who knew Boulez well often referred to his loyalty, both to individuals and to organisations. When his mentor, the conductor Roger Désormière, was paralysed by a stroke in 1952 Boulez sent scripts to French Radio in Désormière's name so that the older man could collect the fee. The writer Jean Vermeil, who observed Boulez in the 1990s in the company of Jean Batigne (founder of the Percussions de Strasbourg), discovered "a Boulez asking about the health of a musician in the Strasbourg orchestra, about another player's children, a Boulez who knew everyone by name and who reacted to each person's news with sadness or with joy". In later life, he was known for his charm and personal warmth. Of his humour, Gerard McBurney wrote that it "depended on his twinkling eyes, his perfect timing, his infectious schoolboy giggle, and his reckless compulsion always to say what the other person would not expect".

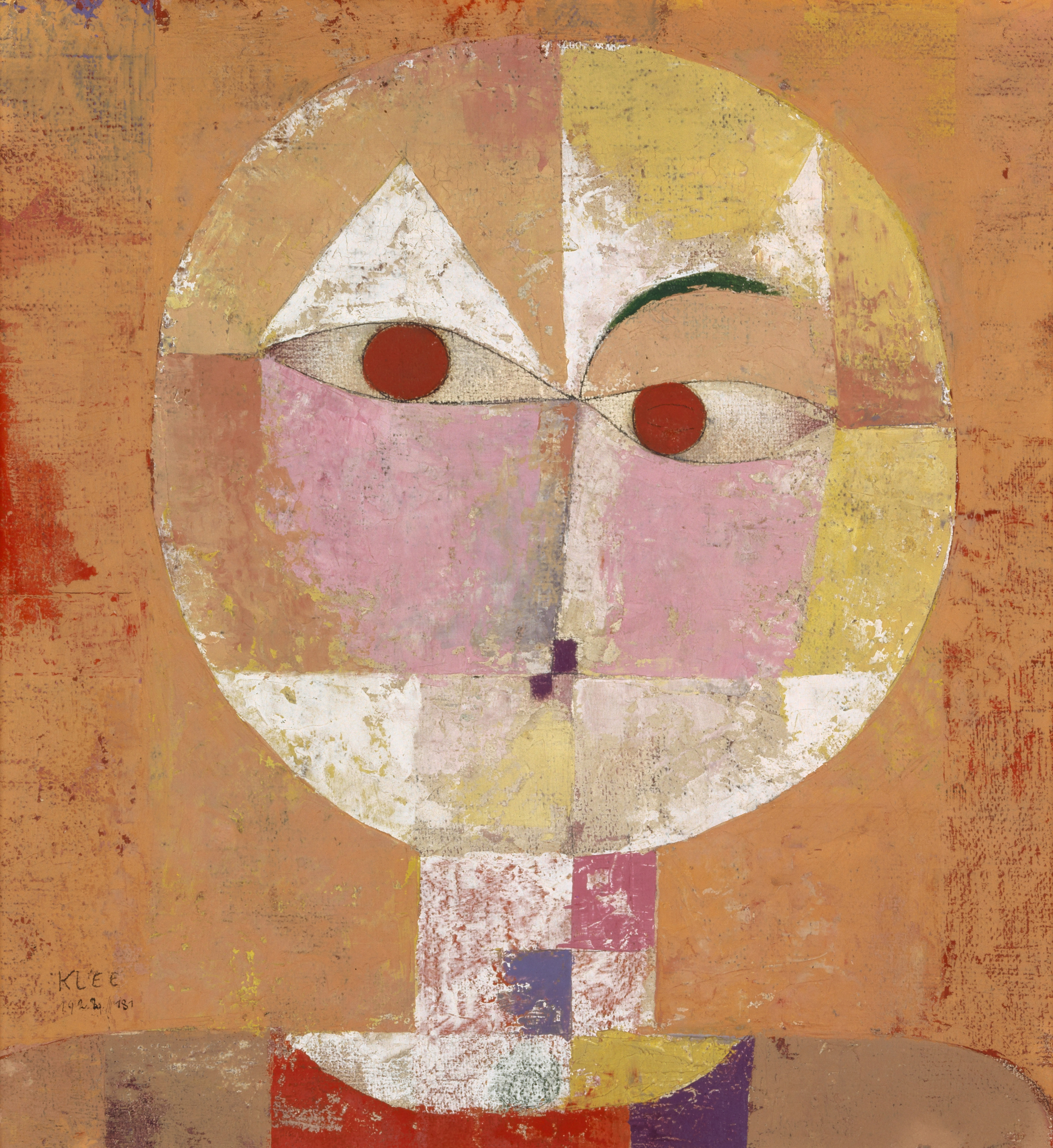
Senecio, Head of a Man (1922) by Paul Klee

Boulez read widely and identified Proust, Joyce and Kafka as particular influences. He had a lifelong interest in the visual arts. He wrote extensively about the painter Paul Klee and owned works by Joan Miró, Francis Bacon, Nicolas de Staël and Maria Helena Vieira da Silva, all of whom he knew personally. He also had close links with three of the leading philosophers of the time: Gilles Deleuze, Michel Foucault and Roland Barthes.

He was a keen walker and, when he was at home in Baden-Baden, spent the late afternoons and much of the weekends walking in the Black Forest. He owned an old farmhouse in the Alpes-de-Haute-Provence department of France and built another, modern home on the same land in the late 1970s.

In its obituary, The New York Times reported that "about his private life he remained tightly guarded". Boulez acknowledged to Joan Peyser that there was a passionate affair in 1946, described as "intense and tormented" and which Peyser suggested was the trigger for the "wild, courageous works" of that period. After Boulez's death, his sister Jeanne told the biographer Christian Merlin that the affair was with the actress María Casares, but Merlin concludes that there is little evidence to support this. Merlin acknowledges the speculation that Boulez was gay. He writes that in 1972 Boulez engaged a young German, Hans Messner, as his personal assistant to look after the practicalities of his life. Messner, who called Boulez 'Monsieur' and whom Boulez sometimes introduced as his valet, lived in the Baden-Baden house until the end of Boulez's life and usually accompanied him when he travelled abroad. Although Merlin observes that in later years it was sometimes difficult to tell whether Messner was looking after Boulez or the other way round, his view is that there is no evidence that they were ever life partners. Towards the end of Boulez's life, Messner blocked Boulez's sister Jeanne from visiting the house. He was with Boulez when he died.

In his portrait for The New Yorker, published shortly after Boulez's death under the title The Magus, Alex Ross described Boulez as "affable, implacable, unknowable".

== Legacy ==
In an article published for Boulez's 80th birthday in The Guardian, the composer George Benjamin wrote that "Boulez has produced a catalogue of wondrously luminous and scintillating works. Within them a rigorous compositional skill is coupled to an imagination of extraordinary aural refinement". By contrast, John Adams described Boulez as "a mannerist, a niche composer, a master who worked with a very small hammer". In a piece in The New York Times to mark Boulez's 90th birthday, Nico Muhly emphasised what he called the decadent qualities of Boulez's later music: "You can feel the butter swirling in that pan. And when he conducts it, he teases out these luxurious textures."

In 1986 Boulez entered into an agreement to place his musical and literary manuscripts with the Paul Sacher Foundation in Basel, Switzerland. When he died in January 2016, he left no will. In 2017, the Bibliothèque nationale de France announced that his estate had made a substantial donation of private papers and possessions not covered by the Sacher contract, including 220 metres of books, 50 metres of archives and correspondence, as well as scores, photographs, recordings and about 100 other objects.

Philharmonie de Paris: Grande salle Pierre Boulez

In October 2016, the large concert hall of the Philharmonie de Paris, for which Boulez campaigned for many years, was renamed the Grande salle Pierre Boulez. In March 2017, a new concert hall, the Pierre Boulez Saal, designed by Frank Gehry, was opened in Berlin under the auspices of the Barenboim–Said Academy. It is home to a new Boulez Ensemble, made up of members of the West-Eastern Divan Orchestra, the Berlin Staatskapelle and guest musicians from Berlin and around the world.

Boulez's music continues to be taken up by interpreters of the next generation. In September 2018 the first edition of the Pierre Boulez Biennial took place in Paris and Berlin, a joint initiative by the Philharmonie de Paris and the Staatskapelle Berlin under Daniel Barenboim, in which performances of Boulez's music are set in the context of works which influenced him. The second Biennial was disrupted by the Covid-19 pandemic, but a modified version went ahead (online in 2020, in person in 2021), with a particular focus on the piano music. The third iteration took place in April/May 2023.

The centenary in 2025 of Boulez's birth was marked by concerts, exhibitions and other events. The Philharmonie de Paris presented a series of concerts featuring his music; it began with a programme of Répons and other works, played by the Ensemble intercontemporain, joined by former members, the cellist Jean-Guihen Queyras and the pianist Pierre-Laurent Aimard. In its 2024/2025 season, the New York Philharmonic presented two concerts—one of which was a recreation of a Boulez programme from 1974—and an exhibition. On 26 March 2025 (the anniversary date), as part of a 'Total Immersion Day' at the Barbican in London, the BBC Symphony Orchestra performed the complete Pli selon pli, conducted by Martyn Brabbins, interspersed with films and talks with people who worked with Boulez. In May, Esa-Pekka Salonen conducted the Los Angeles Philharmonic Orchestra in programmes which included performances of Rituel, presented in collaboration with LA Dance Project and choreographer Benjamin Millepied. In August, the Lucerne Summer Festival feature a rare performance of Poésie pour pouvoir for tape and three orchestras (conducted by David Robertson), as well as Répons, Figures-Doubles-Prismes and other works. Other series and individual concerts were presented across the year by the Pierre Boulez Saal in Berlin, the Festspielhaus Baden-Baden, the London Symphony Orchestra and the Vienna Philharmonic Orchestra.

== Honours and awards ==
State honours awarded to Boulez included Honorary Commander of the Order of the British Empire (CBE); and Knight Commander's Cross of the Order of Merit of the Federal Republic of Germany. Among his many awards, Boulez listed the following in his Who's Who entry: Grand Prix de la Musique, Paris, 1982; Charles Heidsieck Award for Outstanding Contribution to Franco-British Music, Praemium Imperiale, 1989; Polar Music Prize, Stockholm, 1996; Royal Philharmonic Society Gold Medal, 1999; Wolf Prize, Israel, 2000; Grawemeyer Award for Music Composition, University of Louisville, 2001; Glenn Gould Prize, Glenn Gould Foundation, 2002; Kyoto Prize, Japan, 2009; De Gaulle-Adenauer Prize, 2011; Giga-Hertz Prize, 2011; Golden Lion for Lifetime Achievement, Venice Biennale, 2012; Gold Gloria Artis Medal for Merit to Culture, 2012; Robert Schumann Prize for Poetry and Music, 2012; Karol Szymanowski Prize, Foundation Karol Szymanowski, 2012; Frontiers of Knowledge Award, BBVA Foundation, 2013, and nine honorary doctorates from universities and conservatoires in Belgium, Great Britain, Canada, the Czech Republic and the United States.

== Notes, references and sources ==
=== References ===
- Audio interviews in German with Pierre Boulez in the Online Archive of the Österreichische Mediathek (in English)

=== Sources ===
- Aguila, Jesus (1992). Le Domaine Musical, Pierre Boulez et vingt ans de creation contemporaine [Le Domaine Musical, Pierre Boulez and Twenty Years of Contemporary Creation] (in French). Paris: Librairie Arthème Fayard. ISBN 978-2-213-02952-8.
- Akoka, Gérard (2015). Entretiens de Pierre Boulez avec Gérard Akoka [Interviews of Pierre Boulez with Gérard Akoka] (in French). French: Éditions Minerve. ISBN 978-2-86931-138-1.
- Archimbaud, Michel (2016). Pierre Boulez. Entretiens avec Michel Archimbaud [Pierre Boulez. Interviews with Michel Archimbaud] (in French). Paris: Éditions Gallimard. ISBN 978-2-07-041828-2.
- Barbedette, Sarah, ed. (2015). Pierre Boulez. Paris: Actes Sud. ISBN 978-2-330-04796-2. [Catalogue of the exhibition at the Musée de la musique in Paris, 17 March to 28 June 2015]
- Barrault, Jean-Louis (1974). Memories for Tomorrow. Translated by Jonathan Griffin. London: Thames and Hudson. ISBN 978-0-500-01086-0.
- Barulich, Frances (September 1988). "[Review of recently published books by and about Boulez, including Boulez 1981, Glock 1986 etc.]". Notes. 45 (1): 48–52. doi:10.2307/941392. JSTOR 941392.
- Borchardt-Hume, Achim (2015). Alexander Calder–Performing Sculpture. London: Tate Publishing. ISBN 978-1-84976-344-8.
- Boulez, Pierre. 1971. Boulez on Music Today, translated by Susan Bradshaw and Richard Rodney Bennett. Cambridge, MA: Harvard University Press. ISBN 978-0-674-08006-5.
- Boulez, Pierre. 1976. Conversations with Célestin Deliège. London: Ernst Eulenburg Ltd. ISBN 978-0-903873-22-2.
- Boulez, Pierre, and Patrice Chéreau, Richard Peduzzi, Jacques Schmidt. 1980. Histoire d'un Ring with additional texts by Sylvie de Nussac and François Regnault (in French). Paris: Éditions Robert Laffont. ISBN 978-2-253-02853-6.
- Boulez, Pierre. 1986. Orientations: Collected Writings, collected and edited by Jean-Jacques Nattiez, translated by Martin Cooper. London: Faber & Faber, 1986. ISBN 978-0-571-13835-7.
- Boulez, Pierre, and John Cage. 1990. Correspondence et documents, edited by Jean-Jacques Nattiez with Françoise Davoine, Hans Oesch and Robert Piencikowski (in French). Basel: Amadeus Verlag. ISBN 978-3-905049-37-4.
- Boulez, Pierre. 1991. Stocktakings from an Apprenticeship, collected and presented by Paule Thévenin, translated by Stephen Walsh, 209–14. New York: Oxford University Press. ISBN 978-0-19-311210-0.
- Boulez, Pierre. 1995. Points de repère, I: Imaginer, edited by Jean-Jacques Nattiez and Sophie Galaise, with the collaboration of Robert Piecikowski (in French). Musique/passé/présent. Paris: Christian Bourgois. ISBN 978-2-267-01286-6.
- Boulez, Pierre, and André Schaeffner. 1998. Correspondence, 1954–1970, edited by Rosângela Pereira de Tugny (in French). Paris: Fayard. ISBN 978-2-213-60093-2.
- Boulez, Pierre. 2003. Boulez on Conducting. Conversations with Cécile Gilly, translated by Richard Stokes. London: Faber & Faber. ISBN 978-0-571-21967-4.
- Boulez, Pierre. 2005a. Points de repère, II: Regards sur autrui, edited by Jean-Jacques Nattiez and Sophie Galaise (in French). Musique/passé/présent. Paris: Christian Bourgois. ISBN 978-2-267-01750-2.
- Boulez, Pierre. 2005b. Points de repère, III: Leçons de musique: Deux décennies d'enseignement au Collège de France (1976–1995), edited by Jean-Jacques Nattiez (in French). Musique/passé/présent. Paris: Christian Bourgois. ISBN 978-2-267-01757-1.
- Boulez, Pierre. 2017. Entretiens de Pierre Boulez, 1983–2013, recueillis par Bruno Serrou (in French). Château-Gontier: Éditions Aedam Musicae. ISBN 978-2-919046-34-8.
- Boulez, Pierre, and Pierre Souvtchinsky. 2025a. Cher Pierre...Correspondance 1947-1985, edited by Gabriela Elgarrista and Philippe Albèra (in French). Paris: Éditions Contrechamps/Cité de la Musique - Philharmonie de Paris. ISBN 979-10-94642-83-2.
- Campbell, Edward; O'Hagan, Peter (13 October 2016). Pierre Boulez Studies. Cambridge: Cambridge University Press. ISBN 978-1-107-06265-8.
- Di Pietro, Rocco (2001). Dialogues with Boulez. Lanham: The Scarecrow Press, Inc. ISBN 978-0-8108-3932-8.
- Edwards, Allen (June 1989). "Unpublished Bouleziana at the Paul Sacher Foundation". Tempo (169): 4–15. doi:10.1017/S0040298200025109. JSTOR 945317. S2CID 145773969.
- Ford, Andrew (1993). Composer to Composer—Conversations about Contemporary Music. London: Quartet Books Limited. ISBN 978-0-7043-7061-6.
- Galliari, Alain, ed. (2025). Le Catalogue illustré de l'œuvre de Pierre Boulez (in French). Paris: Cité de la musique-Philharmonie de Paris. ISBN 979-10-94642-80-1.
- Glock, William, ed. (1986). Pierre Boulez: A Symposium. London: Eulenburg Books. ISBN 978-0-903873-12-3.
  - Bennett, Gerald. "The Early Works". In Glock (1986), pp. 41–84.
  - Bradshaw, Susan. "The Instrumental and Vocal Music". In Glock (1986), pp. 127–229.
  - Heyworth, Peter. "The First Fifty Years". In Glock (1986), pp. 3–40.
- Glock, William (1991). Notes in Advance. Oxford: Oxford University Press. ISBN 978-0-19-816192-9.
- Goldman, Jonathan (2011). The Musical Language of Pierre Boulez. Cambridge: Cambridge University Press. ISBN 978-1-107-67320-5.
- Goléa, Antoine (1982). Rencontres avec Pierre Boulez [Meetings with Pierre Boulez] (in French). Paris: Editions Slatkine. ISBN 978-2-05-000205-0.
- Griffiths, Paul (1978). Boulez. Oxford Studies of Composers. Oxford: Oxford University Press. ISBN 978-0-19-315442-1.
- Griffiths, Paul (1995a). Modern Music and After: Directions Since 1945. London: Oxford University Press. ISBN 978-0-19-816511-8.
- Griffiths, Paul (1995b). Boulez: Exploding-Fixed. Hamburg: Deutsche Grammophon Gesellschaft GmBH. OCLC 496241633. [Noted to CD]
- Griffiths, Paul (2005). The Substance of Things Heard—Writings about Music. Rochester: University of Rochester Press. ISBN 978-1-58046-206-8.
- Heyworth, Peter (1982). Boulez, Wagner and the Road to Répons. BBC Promenade Concerts 1982 Season Brochure. London: BBC. OCLC 43739920.
- Heyworth, Peter, ed. (1973). Conversations with Klemperer. London: Faber & Faber. ISBN 978-0-571-13561-5.
- Hill, Peter; Simeone, Nigel (2005). Messiaen. New Haven and London: Yale University Press. ISBN 978-0-300-10907-8.
- Hopkins, G.W. (2001). "Boulez, Pierre". Grove Music Online. Revised by Paul Griffiths (8th ed.). Oxford University Press. doi:10.1093/gmo/9781561592630.article.03708. ISBN 978-1-56159-263-0. (subscription, Wikilibrary access, or UK public library membership required) (subscription, Wikilibrary access, or UK public library membership required)
- Iddon, Martin (2013). New Music at Darmstadt. Nono, Stockhausen, Cage, and Boulez. Cambridge: Cambridge University Press. ISBN 978-1-107-03329-0.
- Jameux, Dominique (1991). Pierre Boulez. Translated by Susan Bradshaw. London: Faber & Faber. ISBN 978-0-571-13744-2.
- Jampol, Joshua (2010). Living Opera. Oxford and New York: Oxford University Press. ISBN 978-0-19-538138-2.
- Kenyon, Nicholas (1981). The BBC Symphony Orchestra: The First Fifty Years, 1930–1980. London: British Broadcasting Corporation. ISBN 978-0-563-17617-6.
- Lebrecht, Norman (2001). The Maestro Myth: Great Conductors in Pursuit of Power. New York: Citadel Press. ISBN 978-0-8065-2088-9.
- Meïmoun, François (2010). Entretien avec Pierre Boulez—la naissance d'un compositeur [Interview with Pierre Boulez—The Birth of a Composer] (in French). Château-Gontier: Aedem Musicae. ISBN 978-2-919046-00-3.
- Merlin, Christian (2019). Pierre Boulez (in French). Paris: Les éditions Fayard. ISBN 978-2-213-70492-0.
- O'Hagan, Peter (2017). Pierre Boulez and the Piano: A study in style and technique. London and New York: Routledge. ISBN 978-0-7546-5319-6.
- Olivier, Philippe (2005). Pierre Boulez: Le Maître et son marteau [Pierre Boulez: The Master and his Hammer] (in French). Paris: Hermann, éditeurs des sciences et des arts. ISBN 978-2-7056-6531-9.
- Peyser, Joan (1976). Boulez: Composer, Conductor, Enigma. London: Cassell. ISBN 978-0-304-29901-0.
- Peyser, Joan (1999). To Boulez and Beyond: Music in Europe Since the Rite of Spring. New York: Billboard Books. ISBN 978-0-8108-5877-0.
- Piencikowski, Robert (1990). Boulez: Le Visage nuptial/Le Soleil des eaux/Figures, Doubles, Prismes (CD Set). Hamburg: Erato-Disques S.A. OCLC 705143755.
- Ponsonby, Robert (2009). Musical Heroes, A Personal View of Music and the Musical World Over Sixty Years. London: Giles de la Mare Publishers Limited. ISBN 978-1-900357-29-6.
- Porter, Andrew (1988). Musical Events. London: Grafton Books. ISBN 978-0-246-13311-3.
- Rosenberg, Donald (2000). The Cleveland Orchestra Story, "Second to None". Cleveland: Gray and Company, Publishers. ISBN 978-1-886228-24-5.
- Ross, Alex (2007). The Rest Is Noise: Listening to the Twentieth Century. New York: Farrar, Straus and Giroux. ISBN 978-0-374-24939-7.
- Samuel, Claude (1976). Conversations with Olivier Messiaen. Translated by Felix Aprahamian. London: Stainer and Bell. ISBN 978-0-85249-308-3.
- Samuel, Claude, ed. (1986). Eclats / Boulez (in French). Paris: Editions du Centre Pompidou. ISBN 978-2-85850-342-1.
- Samuel, Claude, ed. (2002). Eclats 2002 (in French). Paris: Mémoire du Livre. ISBN 978-2-913867-14-7.
- Samuel, Claude (2013). Boulez: Complete Works (CD Set). France: Deutsche Grammophon. OCLC 985147586.
- Steinegger, Catherine (2012). Pierre Boulez et le théâtre (in French). Wavre: Éditions Mardaga. ISBN 978-2-8047-0090-4.
- Vermeil, Jean (1996). Conversations with Boulez: Thoughts on Conducting. Translated by Camille Nash. Portland: Amadeus Press. ISBN 978-1-57467-007-3. Selection of programs conducted by Boulez and a discography by Paul Griffiths
- Wagner, Wolfgang (1994). Acts. The Autobiography of Wolfgang Wagner. Translated by John Brownjohn. London: Weidenfeld & Nicolson. ISBN 978-0-297-81349-1.
- Walsh, Stephen (2006). Stravinsky: The Second Exile: France and America, 1934-1971. London: Jonathan Cape. ISBN 978-0-224-06078-3. Archived from the original on 10 August 2023.
