= Rituel in memoriam Bruno Maderna =

Composition for orchestra by Pierre Boulez

- by Pierre Boulez
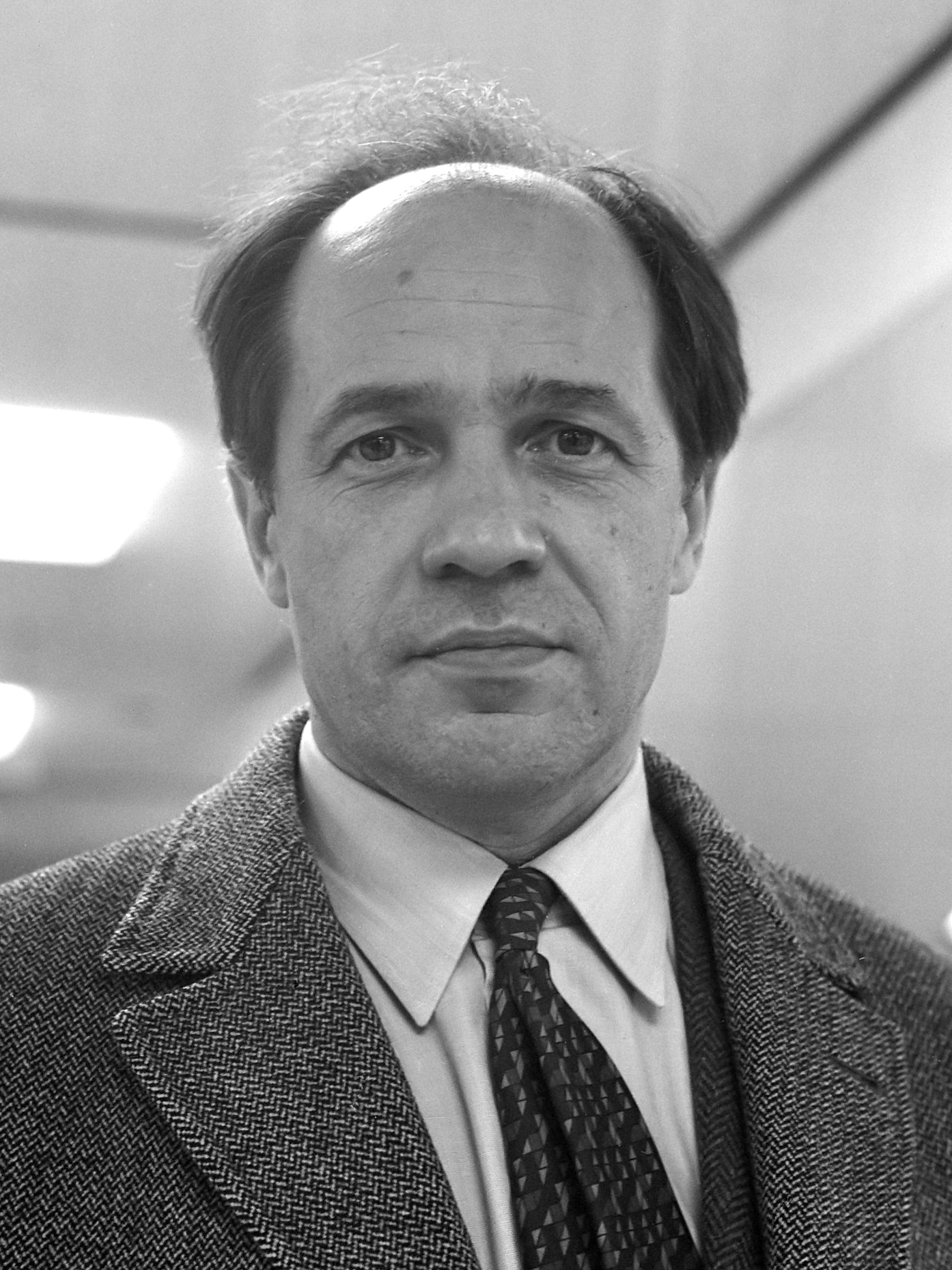
- Boulez in 1968
- Composed: 1974–75
- Dedication: Memory of Bruno Maderna
- Performed: 2 April 1975: London
- Scoring: Orchestra in eight groups

Rituel in memoriam Bruno Maderna (1974–75) is a composition for orchestra in eight groups by Pierre Boulez. Biographer Dominique Jameux wrote that the piece has "obvious audience appeal", and that it represented a desire to establish "immediate, almost physical contact with the public". Jameux also noted that Rituel represents one of the few examples of repetitive music written by Boulez. Author Jonathan Goldman wrote that, of Boulez's works, Rituel is the one that "most evokes... the sound worlds of non-Western musical ensembles, be they Indonesian, African or South American."

== History ==
Rituel, commissioned by BBC London, was written a year after the death of Boulez's friend and fellow composer/conductor Bruno Maderna in December 1973. It was first performed in London on 2 April 1975 by the BBC Symphony Orchestra conducted by Boulez. Following the premiere, Boulez revised the score, removing optional, "open" features due to concerns regarding the ability of a large ensemble to react in a coordinated way to unpredictable situations. Gunther Schuller conducted the Berkshire Music Center Orchestra, a student ensemble, in the U.S. premiere of Rituel on 14 August 1975 as part of the Tanglewood Festival of Contemporary Music.

The musical material of Rituel was derived from ...explosante-fixe..., a two-page tribute to Igor Stravinsky, described by Goldman as "a kind of open-ended composition kit", that Boulez composed for a 1972 issue of the journal Tempo. Over the course of roughly twenty years, Boulez would base a number of compositions, including Anthèmes I and II, on this material.

== Instrumentation ==
In Rituel, the musicians are divided into eight groups that are placed in widely-separated positions throughout the performance space. The groups are as follows:

- one oboe
- two clarinets in B♭
- three flutes
- four violins
- wind quintet (oboe, clarinet in B♭, saxophone, two bassoons)
- string sextet (two violins, two violas, two cellos)
- wind septet (alto flute, oboe, english horn, E♭ clarinet, bass clarinet, two bassoons)
- brass ensemble (four trumpets, six horns, four trombones)

Each of the first seven groups also includes a percussionist, while the eighth group, which is positioned at center stage, features two percussionists. The percussionists, who play non-pitched instruments, help to maintain each group's tempo, as the groups are often rhythmically independent of each other. Though Boulez separated the groups of players as far apart on the stage as possible, David Robertson, conducting the Orchestre National de Lyon at Carnegie Hall in 2003, placed some in the auditorium's balconies. In 2012 Alan Gilbert led a performance in New York's Park Avenue Armory, placing the groups "high and low all over the hall". (It has been suggested that the use of such groups and their spacing may reflect the influence of Maderna's works, such as Quadrivium (1969); on the other hand, Arnold Whittall wrote that, in terms of musical content, Rituel "gives no... hints of reflecting aspects of Maderna's music – or personality.")

The total instrumentation consists of 3 flutes, alto flute, 3 oboes, english horn, 3 clarinets, E♭ clarinet, bass clarinet, saxophone, 4 bassoons, 6 horns, 4 trumpets, 4 trombones, 9 percussion, 6 violins, 2 violas, and 2 cellos.

== Analysis ==
In the preface to the published score, Boulez wrote:

Perpetual alternation:

Litany for an
imaginary ceremonial.

Ceremonial of remembrance—whence these
recurrent patterns, changing in profile
and perspective.

Ceremonial of death, ritual
of the ephemeral and the eternal:
thus the images engraved
on the musical memory—
present/absent, in uncertainty.

The piece is structured as an antiphony with fourteen sections in which seven "responses" (marked très lent) alternate with seven "verses" (marked modéré), followed by an extended coda which is, in turn, composed of seven sections. (Regarding the prevalence of the number seven in Rituel, Susan Bradshaw wrote: "so absolute is the Rule of Seven that it permeates every level of the organization: from the smallest particular detail of pitch and duration, including the number of instruments and instrumental groups, to the number and length of the sections whose sum is the eventual form of the work.") The responses (odd-numbered sections) are marked by dense homophonic writing, with the instrumental groups producing chords that are triggered by the conductor at different times. (Boulez defined homophony as "the direct transformation-by-density of monody—still regarded as unitary".) The verses (even-numbered sections) are more linear, and feature passages of varying length that can be cued by the conductor so as to sound all at once or with staggered entrances, with the result being a heterophonic texture. (Boulez defined heterophony as "the superposition on a primary structure of a modified aspect of the same structure... its density will consist of various strata, rather as if several sheets of glass were to be superposed, each one bearing a variation of the same pattern.") The verses are not conducted; instead, groups are cued by the conductor and proceed independently, with each group's tempo maintained by the associated percussionist.

Overall, Rituel is structured like an arch, beginning with only one of the groups playing, and leading up to a tutti, followed by the coda, in which the forces are gradually reduced to two groups. (Jameux referred to the work as "a Boulezian Farewell Symphony.) At the same time, the percussion instruments gradually assume a more prominent role. In an interview, Boulez described the form of the piece as "in general very simple: it is the form refrain-couplet-refrain-couplet until the middle of the work. After, the percussion becomes denser. The percussion, 'utilitarian' in the first part, becomes the most interesting part in the second." In an essay published in 2004, Boulez elaborated on this aspect of the piece:

At the opening of the piece, where the oboe plays alone, you pay little attention to the percussion, in order to follow the oboe's melodic line. When two or three groups play together, of course you notice the interference patterns of the different percussion instruments, all the more so because each uses a different timbre; but their role remains in the background, since you are occupied with making out the melodic identity of the different groups, and following the heterophonic game through which they correspond with each other. As the number of groups increases, the density can no longer be perceived analytically, and you latch onto the rhythmic interference patterns of the percussion. The more the perception loses its footing in one realm, the more it latches onto a related realm which it had neglected up till then. The principal phenomena become the secondary, and vice versa.

Boulez based the pitch structure of Rituel on a set of seven notes (three tritone pairs plus an additional note), corresponding to the number of the letters in the name "Maderna". (These are the same pitches used in the row of ...explosante-fixe....) This set appears in melodic form in the verses, where it is gradually developed, transposed, reordered, and extended, and its inversion governs the harmony of the refrains.

== Reception ==
In a review of the work's premiere, Peter Heyworth called Rituel "music that, once heard, stamps itself indelibly on the memory". After Boulez conducted the New York Philharmonic in the New York premiere (and the U.S. premiere by a professional orchestra) on 13 January 1977, Harold C. Schonberg wrote that he "was greeted with boos as well as cheers. He took several bows, and the cheers eventually won out."

Later in 1977 Krzysztof Penderecki, asked which contemporary composers he liked, said: "I like Boulez's last piece Rituel, because it's like Messiaen; Boulez seems to have changed his style." Paul Griffiths wrote of the work's "awesome grandeur", calling it "a curious throwback to the world of Messiaen, and especially to that of Et exspecto resurrectionem mortuorum, Messiaen's own liturgy of solos and ensembles with percussion." However, according to Griffiths, Rituel "is neither a celebration of resurrection nor a venturing into new worlds: it is a memorial. In paying tribute to Bruno Maderna, the first of the central Darmstadt band to have died, it seems to throw a wreath over the whole enterprise of the 1950s and 1960s."

Writing for AllMusic, James Harley stated: "the music is... rich in tone and detail. The ritualized unfolding of the refrains and verses provides a framework for a complex, dynamic musical universe. Heard in concert, the spatial distribution of the eight ensembles clarifies the heterophonic nature of the music, enabling the layers of simultaneously unfolding material to be perceived both as distinct entities and as components of the whole. The combination of logic and spontaneity produces a powerful musical experience, a worthy tribute to a valued friend lost too soon." In a New York Times article following Boulez's death, Zachary Woolfe called Rituel a "shimmering memorial... funeral music, as surely as any by Beethoven, Liszt, Wagner or Mahler. Never has Mr. Boulez's lifelong study of the precious immediacy of sound, its resistance to permanence, been more poignant."

Mark Swed, in a review for the Los Angeles Times, wrote: "The score has a processional character and an Asian flavor. Percussion tolls, with gongs favored. Surprisingly, Boulez toys with repetition, which was all the rage in New York at the time but not by Boulez, who was known for favoring ever-changing complexity in his music. Rituel became the best of both worlds — intricate, of course, but also a real and unforgettably poignant ritual." Alex Ross called Rituel "the most sensuously appealing score of Boulez’s career" and commented: "plangent oboe solos, rasping choirs of brass, and intricate splatterings of percussion rang out in ever-changing sonic perspectives, in a musical approximation of a Calder mobile."
