= Dominique Jameux =

French musicologist and radio producer

- Born: 24 December 1939; Vichy
- Died: 2 July 2015 (aged 75); Paris
- Occupations: Musicologist; Radio producer Writer

Dominique Jameux (24 December 1939 – 2 July 2015) was a French musicologist, radio producer and writer.

== Biography ==
Dominique Jameux collaborated with the Atelier de création radiophonique created by Alain Trutat on France Culture and hosted La Musique prend la parole. He later joined France Musique, where he became a producer. He hosted Le Matin des musiciens between 1978 and 1991, as well as programs such as Le Fauteuil de Monsieur Dimanche and Histoires de musique.

Dominique Jameux founded and directed the magazine Musique en jeu, devoted to music of the twentieth century, which appeared every quarter between 1970 and 1978. He dedicated works to Richard Strauss and Alban Berg, which appeared in the series Solfèges of the Éditions du Seuil. In 1984, Fayard published his biography of Pierre Boulez. In 2009, he evoked his professional activity in Radio.

== Awards ==
The Société civile des auteurs multimédia (SCAM) prize was awarded to Dominique Jameux in 1994 for the whole of his radio work. In 2006, he was made a Chevalier of the Ordre du Mérite.

== Publications ==
- 1971: Richard Strauss, Le Seuil, series Solfèges
- 1980: Berg, Le Seuil, series Solfèges, ISBN 2-0200-5515-5
- 1984: Pierre Boulez, Fayard, series Musiciens d'aujourd'hui, ISBN 2-2130-1077-3
- 1986: Richard Strauss, Hachette, series Pluriel, ISBN 2-0101-1127-3
- 1996: Fausto Coppi, L'Echappée belle, Italie 1945 - 1960, Arte Editions, reissued by Denoël, 2003 ISBN 2207255107
- 2002: L'École de Vienne, Fayard, ISBN 2-2135-9969-6
- 2009: Radio, Fayard, ISBN 2-2136-4326-1
- 2012: Opéra Eros et le pouvoir, Fayard, ISBN 978-2-213-67104-8
- 2014: Chopin ou la fureur de soi, Buchet/Chastel, ISBN 978-2-283-02792-9
