= List of compositions by Pierre Boulez =

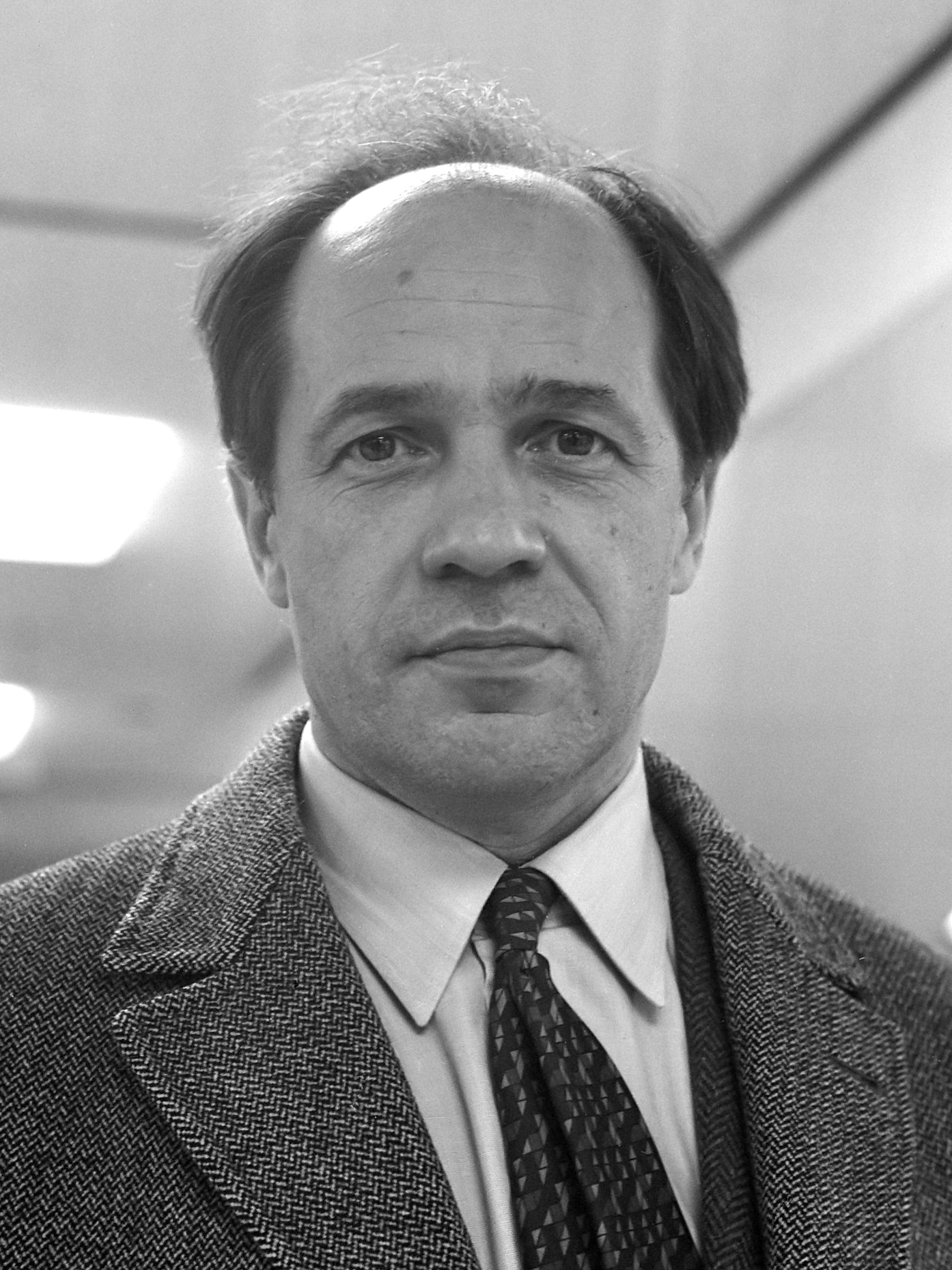
Pierre Boulez in 1968.

A list of works by the French composer Pierre Boulez.

== Compositions ==
=== Published ===
- Douze Notations for piano (1945).
- Sonatine for flute et piano (1946; revised 1949).
- Piano Sonata No. 1 (1946; revised 1949).
- Le Visage nuptial for soprano, mezzo-soprano, chorus and orchestra (1946; revised 1951; revised 1988–89)
- Piano Sonata No. 2 (1948)
- Livre pour quatuor (1948, revised 2011–12); two movements were reworked for string orchestra as Livre pour cordes (1968; revised 1989)
- Le Soleil des eaux for soprano, chorus and orchestra (1948; revised 1950; revised 1958; revised 1965); text: 2 poems by René Char
- Deux Études, musique concrète (1951–52)
- Structures I for two pianos (1951–52)
- Le Marteau sans maître for alto voice and six instruments (1953–55; revised 1957)
- La Symphonie mécanique musique concrète for a film by Jean Mitry (1955)
- L'Orestie incidental music for Aeschylus' trilogy the Oresteia, for voice and instrumental ensemble (1955)
- Piano Sonata No. 3 (1955–57/63); unfinished
- Le Crépuscule de Yang Koueï-Fei musique concrète for the radiophonic play by Louise Fauré (1957)
- Pli selon pli for soprano and orchestra (1957–58, as Improvisations sur Mallarmé I and II; completed 1959–62; revised 1983; revised 1989)
- Structures II for two pianos (1961)
- Figures—Doubles—Prismes for orchestra (1957–58, as Doubles; revised 1964; revised 1968)
- Éclat for ensemble (1965)
- Domaines for clarinet (1968)
- Domaines for clarinet and six instrumental groups (1968)
- Cummings ist der Dichter for chorus and ensemble (1970; revised 1986)
- Éclat/Multiples (1970); Éclat followed by a longer piece for a larger ensemble; unfinished
- Rituel – in memoriam Bruno Maderna for orchestra in eight groups (1974)
- Ainsi parla Zarathoustra incidental music for voice and ensemble (1974)
- Messagesquisse for solo cello and six cellos (1976)
- Répons for two pianos, harp, vibraphone, xylophone, cimbalom, ensemble and live electronics (1980; revised and expanded 1982; revised and expanded 1984)
- Dérive 1 for six instruments (1984)
- Dialogue de l'ombre double for clarinet and electronics (1985)
- Mémoriale (…explosante-fixe… originel) for flute and ensemble (1985); an arrangement of the central section from the withdrawn work ...explosante-fixe...
- Fragment d'une ébauche for piano (1987)
- Initiale for brass ensemble (1987)
- Dérive 2 for eleven instruments (1988; revised 2002; expanded and completed 2006)
- Anthèmes for violin (1991; revised and expanded 1994)
- Fanfare for the 80th Birthday of Georg Solti for brass and percussion (1992; originally titled Dérive 3)
- …explosante-fixe… for solo MIDI flute, two "shadow" flutes, chamber orchestra, and electronics (1991–93); three of nine projected movements
- Incises for piano (1994; revised and expanded 2001)
- Anthèmes II for violin and live electronics (1997)
- sur Incises for three pianos, three harps and three percussionists (1996–98)
- Une page d’éphéméride for piano (2005)

=== Unpublished ===
- Nocturne for piano (1944–45), unpublished.
- Prélude, toccata et scherzo for piano (1944–45), unpublished.
- Trois Psalmodies for piano (1945); unpublished, withdrawn.
- Thème et variations for piano, left hand (1945); unpublished.
- Quatuor pour quatre ondes Martenot (Quartet for four ondes Martenot) (1945–46), unpublished.
- Onze Notations (1946); arrangement for chamber ensemble of eleven of the Douze notations, unpublished.
- Symphonie concertante for piano and orchestra (1947); lost
- Sonata for Two Pianos (1948); revision of the quartet for Ondes Martenot; withdrawn
- Polyphonie X for ensemble (1950–51); withdrawn
- Oubli signal lapidé for 12 solo voices (1952); withdrawn
- Poésie pour pouvoir for tape and 3 orchestras (1955/58); withdrawn
- Strophes for flute (1957); unfinished
- Improvisé—pour le Dr. Kalmus for flute, clarinet, piano, violin, and cello (1969; revised 2005), unpublished.
- …explosante-fixe… for flute, clarinet, and trumpet (1971–72); withdrawn
- …explosante-fixe… new version for flute, clarinet, trumpet, harp, vibraphone, violin, viola, cello, and electronics (1973–74); withdrawn
- …explosante-fixe… version for vibraphone and electronics (1986); withdrawn

=== Revisions of previous works ===
- Livre pour cordes (1968; revised 1989); revision of Livre pour quatuor (1948)
- Notations I–IV and VII for orchestra (1978–1984/1997)
- Dialogue de l'ombre double (transcribed for bassoon and electronics, 1985/1995)
- Dialogue de l'ombre double (authorized transcription for recorder by Erik Bosgraaf, 2014)

== Sources ==
- Campbell, Edward, and Peter O'Hagan. 2016. Pierre Boulez Studies. Cambridge: Cambridge University Press. ISBN 978-1-107-06265-8, pp. 25–55.
- Goldman, Jonathan. 2011. The Musical Language of Pierre Boulez. Cambridge: Cambridge University Press. ISBN 978-1-107-67320-5, pp. 215–217.
- Griffiths, Paul. 1978. Boulez (Oxford Studies of Composers). London: Oxford University Press. ISBN 0-19-315442-0, pp. 62–63.
- Hopkins, G. W., and Paul Griffiths. 2011. "Boulez, Pierre", Grove Music Online, ed. Deane Root (accessed 6 January 2016). (Subscription access)
- Samuel, Claude (ed.). 2002. Eclats 2002. Paris: Mémoire du Livre. ISBN 2-913867-14-6, p. 421–430.
