= Alain Damiens =

French classical clarinetist (born 1950)

Alain Damiens (born 1950 in Calais) is a French classical clarinetist.

== Life ==
After studying clarinet at the Conservatoire de Calais, Alain Damiens studied with Ulysse Delécluse at the Conservatoire de Paris and obtained his first prizes (clarinet, chamber music). He received a scholarship to the National Music Camp Michigan in the United States, where he studied clarinet, chamber music and orchestra.

He was solo clarinet at the Orchestre philharmonique de Strasbourg and at « Pupitre 14 » (Amiens). In 1976, by artistic choice, he joined the IRCAM (clarinet in B flat, small clarinet in E flat, basset horn, bass clarinet) conducted by Pierre Boulez. He was the performer of pieces by contemporary composers, notably Philippe Fénelon, Franco Donatoni, Karlheinz Stockhausen and Vinko Globokar.

His mastery of the clarinet designated him for the premieres of numerous reference works in Contemporary classical music: Boulez' Dialogue de l'ombre double (1985), Carter's Concerto pour clarinette (1997), En Trio by Gilbert Amy...

Holder of the Certificate of Aptitude, he was a professor at the Conservatoire de Strasbourg until 1977 then at the Conservatoire de Paris with Michel Arrignon. Since 1977, he has been a clarinet teacher at the Conservatoire à rayonnement régional d'Aubervilliers

He shares his expertise in master classes in France and around the world (Canada, Brazil, Chile, Sweden...).

He has experimented with a "variable volume clarinet mouthpiece" on several pieces.

== Discography ==
- Stravinsky, Ebony concerto; Three pieces for clarinet only. (Polydor, 1982)
- Messiaen's Quatuor pour la fin du temps clarinet – Maryvonne Le Dizès-Richard; Alain Damiens; Pierre-Laurent Aimard; Pierre Strauch (1987)
- Alain Damiens plays Stravinsky (Three pieces) – Boulez (Domaines) – Denisov (Sonata) – Stockhausen (In Freundschaft) – Donatoni (Clair) – Berio (Sequenza IX) (1988, Adda 581066 / Accord) OCLC 953244964
- Bartók's Contrastes; Berg (Adagio excerpt from Concerto de chambre); Stravinsky's (L'Histoire du soldat); Amy (En Trio) – Maryvonne Le Dizès, violin; Alain Damiens, clarinet; Pierre-Laurent Aimard, piano (13–15 May 1989, Adda 581142 / Accord 240112) OCLC 658794213, 38878024
- Boulez's Sonatine pour flûte et piano; Première sonate pour piano; Dérive; Mémorial; Dialogue de l'ombre double; Cummings ist der Dichter – Ensemble intercontemporain, BBC Singers, dir. Pierre Boulez; Sophie Cherrier, flute; Pierre-Laurent Aimard, piano; Alain Damiens, clarinet (9 March 1990, Erato Records/ Apex / Warner) OCLC 24919086, OCLC 611392200, 798316041
- Xenakis (Charisma); Haïm (Trio « Nighted »); Lenot (Lied VI); Fenelon (« Orion » Mythologie II); Vinko Globokar (Discours IV) (1991, Adda /[Musique française d'aujourd'hui 581277) OCLC 492401649
- Présences '92: Festival international de Radio France clarinet, 1992: Kasper T. Toeplitz, Ernst Bechert, João Rafael, Michael Jarrell, Marco Stroppa, Nicolas Bacri, Stéphane Bortoli, Simon Holt, Gérard Pesson, Franck Krawczyk, Frédéric Durieux – Orchestre national de France; Orchestre philharmonique de Radio France; Ensemble Alternance; Ensemble Fa; Asko Ensemble; Ensemble Contrechamps; Accroche Note; Fabrice Bollon; Dominique My; Mark Foster; Denis Cohen; Giorgio Bernasconi; Arturo Tamayo; Jean-Pierre Arnaud; Franck Krawczyk; Sylvie Sullé; Ingrid Kappelle; Pierre-Laurent Aimard; Alain Damiens; Dominique de Williencourt.
- Helmut Lachenmann, Dal Niente – Pression – Wiegenmusik – Allegro Sostenuto – Pierre-Laurent Aimard; Alain Damiens; Pierre Strauch (1003, Accord 202082)
- Hurel, Six miniatures en trompe-l'œil; Leçon de choses; Opcit; Pour l'image for clarinet, bass clarinet; Ensemble intercontemporain; Ed Spanjaard; Alain Damiens (1995, Musidisc)
- Xenakis, Anaktoria; Morsima-Amorsima; Oophaa; Charisma; Mists; Mikka / Mikka « S » – Octuor de Paris, Elisabeth Chojnacka, harpsichord; Sylvio Gualda, percussion; Alain Damiens, clarinet; Pierre Strauch, cello; Claude Helffer; Maryvonne Le Dizès, violin (1972, 1984, 1985 and 1990, Accord 205652) OCLC 36697361
- Boulez's Répons; Dialogue de l'ombre double – Ensemble InterContemporain / Pierre Boulez / Alain Damiens (1998, Deutsche Grammophon) OCLC 781040870
- Brahms' Complete work for clarinet (Musidisc,1996)
- Berio, Sequenza IXa (1998, Deutsche Grammophon)
- American Clarinet Adams (Gnarly Buttons); Sandroff (Tephillah), Carter's (Clarinet Concerto; Gra); Reich (New York counterpoint) – Ensemble intercontemporain, dir. David Robertson; Alain Damiens; André Trouttet (1996 and 1998, Virgin Classics 5 45351 2 / EMI) OCLC 469333678
- Lachenmann, Wiegenmusik; Pression; Dal niente; Allegro sostenuto – Pierre-Laurent Aimard; Pierre Strauch; Alain Damiens (2000)
- Mounir Anastas, Sentence funèbre... – Alain Gerber, spoken voice; Alain Damiens, clarinet; Daniel Kientzy, saxophon (2006, Intégral classic) OCLC 658722025
- Minimalism: Philip Glass, Steve Reich – Alain Damiens, Ransom Wilson; Solisti New York (EMI, 2008)
- François Nicolas, Infinis – Florence Millet, Jeanne-Marie Conquer, Alain Damiens (Triton, 2011)
