= ...explosante-fixe... =

Composition by Pierre Boulez

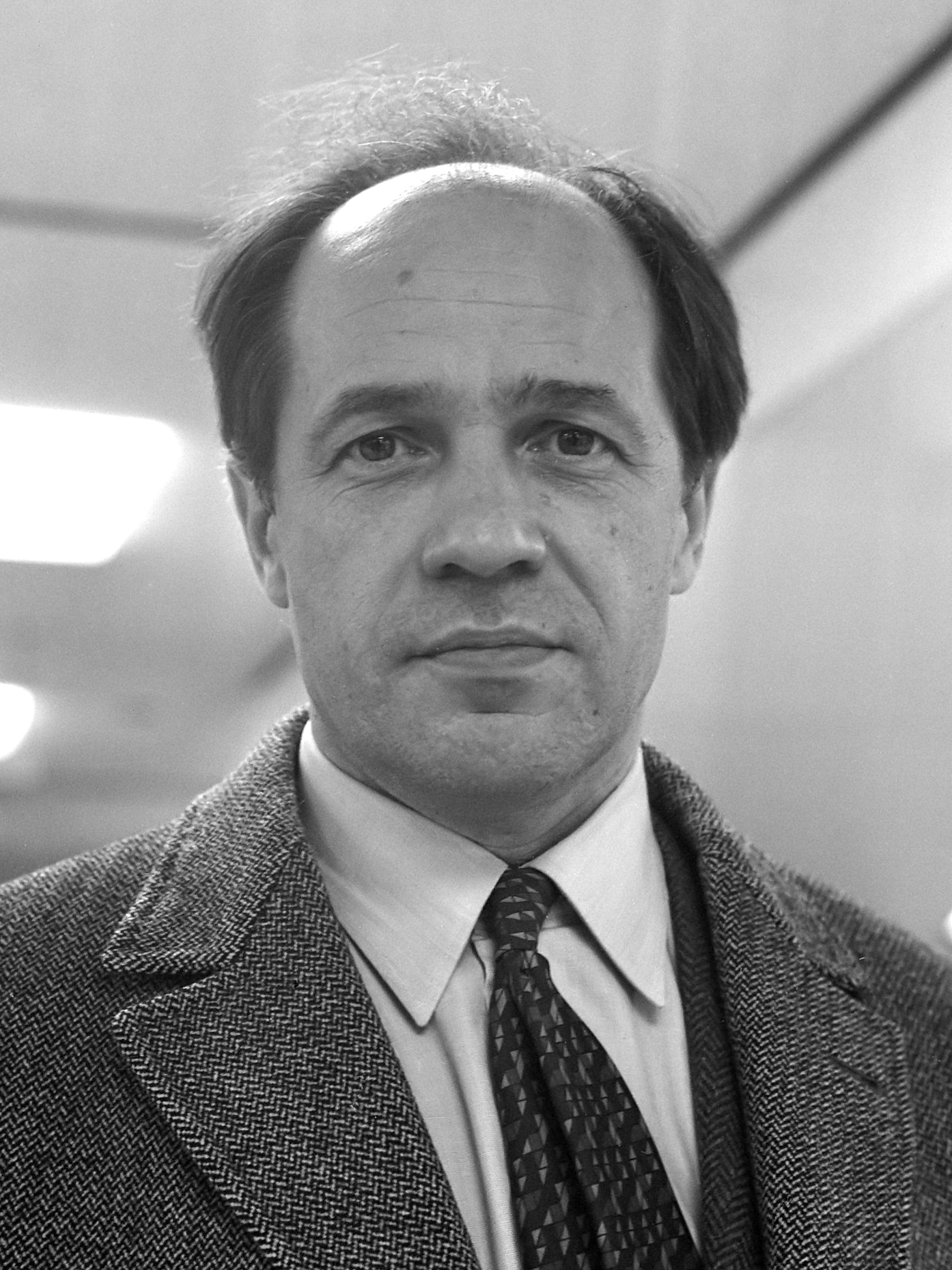
Pierre Boulez in 1968

...explosante-fixe... (French: ...exploding-fixed...) is a piece of music composed by Pierre Boulez. Initially conceived in 1971 as a memorial for Igor Stravinsky, who died in April of that year, several different versions of the work were composed by Boulez between 1972 and 1993, culminating in a piece for solo MIDI-flute and chamber orchestra.

== Title ==
The title of the work is taken from the concluding line of the first chapter of André Breton's L'amour fou (1937): "La beauté convulsive sera érotique-voilée, explosante-fixe, magique-circonstancielle, ou ne sera pas" (Convulsive beauty will be erotic-veiled, exploding-fixed, magical-circumstantial, or it will not be at all).

== History ==
The first version of ...explosante-fixe... (1971–1972) is a one-page aleatoric work in seven parts entitled, according to one report, Originel and Transitoires II–VII, though the manuscript score (published as two pages of music and twelve pages of instructions) bears the title in the composer's hand [... Explosante-fixe ...], and the indications "Originel" and "Transitoires II–VII" are the names of the groups into which the work is divided. The seven parts each represent one member of a seven-note row found in the "Originel" section: E♭, G, D, A♭, B♭, A, E, an emblem of the Stravinsky memorial for which it was composed (the note E♭ sustained at the beginning is pronounced Es in German, cognate with the letter S for "Stravinsky"). The pitches of this row were later used also in Rituel. In this original form, the instruments were not indicated, though a possible scoring for two violins, two flutes, two clarinets, and harp is suggested. Like most of the other pieces in the Stravinsky memorial, this reflects the instrumentation of two brief commemorative works Stravinsky wrote in 1959: the Epitaphium for flute, clarinet, and harp, and the Double Canon (in memory of Dufy) for string quartet.

In the two subsequent years, Boulez developed ...explosante-fixe... into a work for solo flute, accompanied by clarinet, trumpet, harp, vibraphone, violin, viola, cello and electronics. Performances of this version made use of a recently created device known as the Halaphone. According to inventor Hans Peter Haller, the Halaphone is capable of "projecting sounds in various directions and at various speeds at will, projecting sound from point to point, making it move in circles around a hall, or making it move diagonally across a hall."

Boulez, however, was ultimately unsatisfied with the electronics. There were actually two main variants, a "preliminary" version based on the bare bones of the outline score and scored for a trio of violin, clarinet, and trumpet, first performed by the London Sinfonietta in St John's, Smith Square in June 1972, and a longer, more sophisticated, and seemingly definitive form for septet, premiered in New York on 5 January 1973 and subsequently revised several times, for performances in Rome on 13 May 1973, at the Promenade Concerts in London in August 1973, at the Donaueschinger Musiktage on 21 October 1973 (by which time it had become an octet) and at the Théâtre d'Orsay in Paris as part of the Festival d'Automne 1974, where it created a sensation. These revisions involved changes in the order of sections and rewriting six of the eight instrumental parts. In all, there are four different versions for the flute, three versions each for the viola and cello, two versions each for the trumpet, violin, and clarinet, but only one version each for the vibraphone and harp, which differ from one version to the next only in the ordering of their constituent parts. Boulez withdrew the materials for both versions, primarily because of his dissatisfaction with the all-too-audible failure of the electronics, and in particular the computer tape that was intended to direct the conductorless 1973 Proms version, but also as an acknowledgement that the scoring really required a symphony orchestra.

The next version of ...explosante-fixe..., for vibraphone and electronics, was not composed until 1986. In the intervening years, parts of the original material appeared in other works by Boulez, specifically Rituel (1975) and Mémoriale (1985).

Between 1991 and 1993, while at IRCAM, Boulez composed a new version of ...explosante-fixe..., for solo MIDI-flute with live electronics, two "shadow" flutes and a chamber orchestra. This version premiered in Turin, Italy at Settembre Musica Festival on 13 September 1993, in a performance by the Ensemble InterContemporain.
