= Diogenes Rivas =

Venezuelan musician

Diógenes Rivas
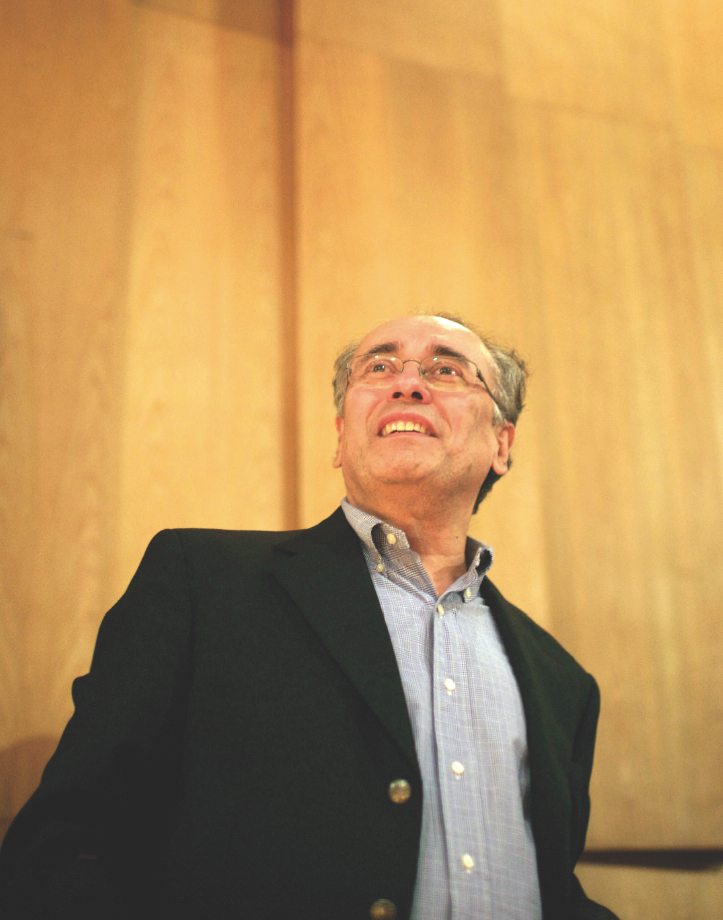
- Born: October 4, 1942 (age 83); Mérida, Venezuela
- Occupations: Musician, composer

Diogenes Rivas (born October 4, 1942) is a Venezuelan composer as well as a researcher of contemporary music. Additionally, he devotes time to teaching and the training of young composers. Rivas is the co-founder and artistic director of the Festival Atempo (Caracas) and artistic director (along with Pierre Strauch and Antonio Pileggi) of the Paris Nuit d'Atempo.

== Biography ==
Diogenes Rivas began to study music in the city of Mérida at the age of four with his father, Professor Jose Rafael Rivas, studying piano and oboe. Later on, in Caracas, his teachers were Moleiro Moses and Inocente Carreño (from 1954 to 1957). He continued his studies at the Academia Santa Cecilia in Rome, Italy, from 1958 to 1964. He also studied conducting with Sir John Barbirolli and Carlo Zecchi in Taormina, Italy and with Bruno Maderna in Salzburg, Austria (1968). He studied composition with Alfred Nieman in London from 1975 to 1977. A deep bond with Francisco Guerrero (in Madrid) led him to explore the constructivist technique of composition. Since 1980 he is dedicated exclusively to composing.

Rivas has received commissions from Radio France, the Fifth International Guitar Competition, the Ville d'Antony, France; Order, French Ministry of Culture, the Festival Presence, the Society of Authors and Composers SACEM of France, the Join 2E2M, the Ensemble Aleph and the Societe Francaise de Luth.

The Italian composer Antonio Pileggi describes the work of this artist as follows: "His music is an original synthesis of the great occidental traditions and of an association of techniques derived from specific mathematical and geometric structures. The result is an eclecticism that integrates diverse speculative disciplines and a musical creativity both unusual and seductive..."

In 2013, Rivas received the Ordre des Arts et des Lettres (Order of the Arts and Letters) by the French government.

== Festival Atempo ==
Since 1993, this Festival is dedicated to the international diffusion of outstanding contemporary repertory as well as that of traditional music from all periods of history. Atempo offers a space for the confrontation of thought as well as serious discourse from diverse points of view related to musical creation and interpretation. The Atempo Festival celebrated its 17th anniversary in July 2010 with an audience of more than 4,000 attending the three-day event. Throughout its uninterrupted history of nearly two decades, the Festival has presented 666 musical works of 320 different composers; 102 world premieres of works written especially for the Festival; 262 premieres for Venezuela, and 42 commissions, including 2 collective works in 191 concerts. Also, the festival has hosted 31 workshops on composition, dance, storytelling, poetry, painting and film; 47 musical lectures; 32 conferences; 1 opera; 4 dance venues; 15 poetry recitals; 9 plastic interventions (1 of design); 7 books published; 1 photo exhibition and a musical album commemorating the Festival's 15 anniversary.

== The music of Diogenes Rivas ==
The following is an extract form a letter the Italian maestro Antonio Pileggi wrote (in 2002) relating to Diogenes Rivas, his art and character:

For about twenty years, Maestro Diogenes Rivas has had a presence on the European and American musical scene. As a result, his work has become an important reference in the creative world. Yearly, his compositions are heard in the most important musical centers of the moment: Paris, London Zurich, Venice, New York Montreal, Cincinnati Caracas and others. Additionally, yearly performances of commissioned works are presented by the most prestigious musical institutions (Radio France, I'EIC, Aleph...) thus confirming his growing international recognition. The music of Maestro Rivas is a synthesis consisting of the major compositional elements of Western musical traditions and composing techniques provided in mathematical and geometrical structures (such as the number of mandala gold and structure). Indeed it is a syncretism that integrates the different disciplines as is the case in the "Quadrivium" of Greek and medieval culture in which music was integrated into mathematics, geometry and astronomy. This characteristic in Rivas is more about being Venezuela's temperament rather than its language. Nevertheless, this comparison is not enough to give us an understanding of the special touch that makes his world strange and seductive. Beyond the impeccable mastery of the orchestrations and the entire compositional practice, there is a wise and masterful modernity. In other words, not only has he the temerity to explore structure and language to its limits but also is able to produce an astonishing result of great musical coherence and original timbres without ever breaking the balance between abstraction and human perceptual ability.

In the contemporary music scene of recent years, the works of Maestro Rivas are in the forefront of living Latin American composers. He is considered the Venezuelan composer par excellence with great success representing his homeland of Venezuela, so rich in art and cultural personalities.

Nevertheless, in Europe and America we also recognize Rivas for his work as Artistic Director and the important pedagogic aspect developed by the Venezuelan and French Festival Atempo. At a moment when Europe was immersed in a certain crisis of ideas, this accomplishment has impressed European criticism because of its high standard and outstanding performers. In 17 years, (updated to 2010), the Festival Atempo has become an important global benchmark. In Europe, when speaking of Venezuela, the Festival Atempo is its immediate reference.

Rivas's work is achieving positive results for Venezuelan culture. Thanks to the Festival, Caracas has become a world center for musical creation. There is also an emerging generation of young composers – valuable Venezuelans – whose originality is appreciated for the first time during the course of each edition of the Festival.

Finally, I would like to highlight another of Rivas's great musical and artistic qualities referring to his human stature. His generosity is sans pair. Of great courage and love for culture, I wish to see him continue in his efforts to advance universal art.

== Academic activities ==
- 1965–68; 1970–72 — Director of the School of Music, Universidad de Los Andes, Mérida-Venezuela
- 1965–68 — Director of the Choir of the Universidad de Los Andes, Universidad de Los Andes, Mérida-Venezuela

== Lectures ==
- University of San Diego, California, May 8, 2009. Conference "Ars Compositiva"
- Conservatorio del Liceo de Barcelona (España), November 13, 2007. Lectures
- University of Cincinnati. College-Conservatory de Music, April 15, 16, 17, 2002. Lectures
- National Music Conservatory of Paris, November 2004. Lectures at the Cátedra de Composición del Maestro Paúl Mefanó
- University of Houston, April 9, 2002. Conference Acercamiento a la Música Contemporánea
- Cité de la Musique, March 25, 2000. Les jounées du violoncelle: "Técnicas y procedimientos de escritura para obras destinadas al violoncello"
- Academia de Música de Basilea (Basel, Switzerland), December 2, 1997. Lecture
- Festival Atempo Caracas, July 2001. Juegos del Tiempo: Reflection on the concept. Speakers: Diógenes Rivas, José Manuel Briceño Guerrero and Asdrúbal Colmenarez. Introducer: Valentina Marulanda
- Festival Atempo Caracas, July 1999, Caos y Armonía: Reflection on the concept. Speakers: Diógenes Rivas, Luis Alberto Crespo and Rodolfo Izaguirre. Introducer: Alfredo Chacón
- Festival Atempo Caracas, July 1998, Herencia y Continuidad: Reflection on the concept. Speakers: Domingo Miliani, Diógenes Rivas and Luis Alberto Crespo. Introducer: Stefania Mosca
- Festival Atempo Caracas, July 1997, Enigma, resonancia del vaticinio: Reflection on the musical work "Soberbio Orinoco". Speakers: Luis Alberto Crespo, Alfredo Chacón, Sergio Pitol and Diógenes Rivas. Introducer: Maruja Dagnino
- Festival Atempo Caracas, July 1996, El Arte como Ilusión Liberadora: Reflections on life and work of Antonin Artaud. Speakers: Diógenes Rivas, Alfredo Chacón and Perán Erminy. Introducer: Maruja Dagnino. Place: Centro Cultural Consolidado. Conference Auditorium.
- Museo de Bellas Artes. Caracas, May 1996, Conference on the work of artist Victor Lucena. "Intervención en el Espacio"

== Catalog of works (1975–2010) ==
Year	Work	Release	Length
2020	Violin solo (to David Nuñez on his 50th anniversary)		1"
2020	Canticum Cantorum, soprano, clarinet and piano		6"
2018/2020	Concert for Piano and Orchestra		22"
2016	Estructura Aurea, piano	Manuel Laufer.	8"
2014/15	Ritmomachia III, full orchestra		22´
2014	Cinco Preludios, piano	Manuel Laufer, piano Una Tarde con Atempo 2014	13´
2013	Axioma de Escogencia I, violin solo	David Nuñez (violin); Una Tarde con Atempo 2015	8´
2013	Axioma de Escogencia VII, violin and violoncello	Sona Khochafían, violin, Pierre Strauch, violoncello Festival Atempo 201	8´
2012	Cuarteto de cuerdas No. 2, string quartet	Cuarteto de Cuerdas UNTREF; Buenos Aires	10´
2012	Franz Liszt, two voices and piano	Dorothea Hayley (voice), Manuel Laufer (piano); XVIII Festival Atempo-Caracas 2011	10´
2010	Rondo, violin and guitar (duo)	David Nuñez / Pablo Gómez Cano – XVII Festival Atempo-Caracas	5'
2010	Tango	Sophia Vaillant (piano) – XVII Festival Atempo-Caracas	3'
2009	Ayre, violin And violoncello (duo)	Sona Khochafian / Pierre Strauch – Nuit d'Atempo-Paris, November, 2009	7'
2009	Impromptu II, piano	Kristiina Junttu – Aula Magna Universidad de Los Andes-Mérida, Venezuela – XVI Festival Atempo-Caracas	8'
2008	Oubli dux Monde á venir, voice (bass) – poem by Julian Marcland		10'
2008	Carnival, 2 flutes and violin (trio)	Karina Fischer / Guillermo Lavado / David Nuñez – CIMA 4th Concert Season – Goethe Institute-Santiago de Chile	4' 30"
2007	Impromptu I, piano	Dimitri Vassilakis – XIV Festival Atempo-Caracas	8'
2007	Ave Maria Stella, 6 voices		5'
2006	Trío No 2 "Espejos" Homage to Ravel. Violin, violoncello and piano	Trio Atempo: Sona Khochafían Pierre Strauch, Alain Neveux – XVIII Festival Atempo-Caracas	8'
2005	Cantos del Alma. Poems by San Juan de la Cruz	Vocal quintet: Les Oréades – XVII Festival Atempo-Caracas (Recorded by the same Quintet in 2008. Psalmus Label)	7'
2005	Eurytmia. Fl, ob, cl, Clbj, fg, hn, tp, tb, vlI, vil, vla, vlc, cbj, two percussionists	Tokio Sinfonietta – XVII Festival Atempo-Caracas	10'
2004	Le Poisson de Jade, violin, violoncello and piano. Commissioned by Radio France	Hae Sung-Kang, Pierre Strauch, Dimitri Vassilakis – Paris, Radio France. December 19, 2004	10'
2004	Lied, for voice. Poems by José Antonio Ramos Sucre	Mónica Jordán – XVI Festival Atempo-Caracas	4'
2004	Fanfarria Nupcial, dedicated to my sons Robert and Nivia	Quinteto de Cobres – Iglesia San Rafael, La Florida, February, 2004	5'
2004	Ave María, to my sons Robert y Nivia. Soprano and clarinet	Margot Parés Reyna / Alejandro Montes de Oca – Iglesia San Rafael, La Florida. February 2004	5'
2003	Rondo, for guitar. Commissioned by the V Concurso Internacional de Guitarra de la Ville d'Antony		4' 30"
2003	Rondo, violin, piano and vibraphone (trio)	Hae Sung-Kang, Dimitri Vassilakis, Daniel Ciampolini – X Festival Atempo-Caracas	4'
2003	Cuarteto No. 2. Violin, viola, violoncello and piano	Ensamble Nomad (Japón) – X Festival Atempo-Caracas	8'
2003	Fantasía, for vibraphone	Diana Montoya – Goethe-Institut, Paris. November 2004	6'
2002	Rithmomachia, for two pianos	Dimitri Vassilakis and Hideki Nagano – IX Festival Atempo-Caracas (Recorded at Radio France on September 13, 2004 by Dimitri Vassilakis and Fuminori Tanada)	12'
2002	Deimos y Phobos. Two violoncellos	Anssi Karttunen y Roi Routtinen – IX Festival Atempo-Caracas	4'
2001	Estructura Mandala V. Clarinet	Alain Damiens – VIII Festival Atempo-Caracas	—
2001	Estructura Mandala IV. Violin	David Núñez – Brussels, November 25, 2001	8' 30"
2000	Tríptico, voice. Poems by Luis Alberto Crespo	Mónica Jordán – VII Festival Atempo-Caracas	6'
2000	Khochafian's Quintet	Quintet Cuesta (España) – VII Festival Atempo-Caracas	13'
2000	Al paso, for voice, clarinet, violoncello and piano. Poems by Alfredo Chacón and Luis Alberto Crespo. Commissioned by the State of the Ministry of Culture of France	Dominique Clément (clarinet), Christophe Roy (violoncello) and François Matringe (piano) – Teatro Dunois, Ensemble Aleph. December 9, 2000	14'
1999	Concertare a Nove. Flute, clarinet, corn, trombone, piano, percussion, violin, viola and violoncello. Commissioned by the Ensemble 2e2m (France)	VI Festival Atempo-Caracas	15'
1998	El jardín de los senderos que se bifurcan II, for oboe and nine instrumento: flute, clarinet, French horn, trombone, vibraphone, violin, viola, violoncello and piano	Ensamble Atempo (Director: Diego Masson / Oboe: László Hadady) – V Festival Atempo-Caracas	9'
1998	Cuatro piezas pequeñas para piano	Claude Helffer – V Festival Atempo-Caracas	7'
1997	Ordre. Flute, clarinet, violin, cello, piano and vibráfono	La Nouvel Ensemble Moderne de Montreal (Canada). May 7, 1997	9'
1997	El soberbio Orinoco. Collective work of composers Jean Baptiste Devillers, Antonio Pileggi, Diógenes Rivas, Pierre Strauch. Commissioned by SACEM (Société des auteurs, compositeurs et éditeurs de musique (France)	Ensambles Atempo y Aleph – IV Festival Atempo-Caracas	45'
1996	Kalleidokollage. Soprano, flute, flute in G, clarinet, bass, violin, viola, violoncello and piano	Ensamble Kaleidocollage – III Festival Atempo-Caracas	11'
1995	Prélude pour Théorbe. Commissioned by the Société Française de Luth	Caroline Delume Théorbe. Société Française de Luth, Paris. December 2, 1995	4'
1994	Estructura Mandala III, for piano. Commissioned by de Radio France	Claude Helffer – Radio France. February, 1995 / III Festival Atempo-Caracas. July 1996	14'
1994	El jardín de los senderos que se bifurcan, for oboe. Commissioned by the American Composer Orchestra	Roberto Ingliss – New York, 1994	7'
1994	Canon ad Infinitum. Violoncello, soprano, clarinet and percussion. Commissioned by the Ensemble Aleph	Recorded by Ensemble Aleph	20'
1993	Estructura Mandala, for guitar	Pedro Angel, Museo de Arte Contemporáneo de Caracas Sofía Imber. August 21, 1993 / New version (Caracas, 2007): Pablo Gómez, Circulo de Bellas Artes México, September 12, 2008	11'
1993	Estructura Mandala II, for violoncello	Pierre Strauch – Paris	13'
1991	Rithmomachia, for String Orchestra	David Núñez (Concertino Conductor). Chamber Orchestra of the Universidad Católica. 18 Festival de Música Contemporánea de Chile. November 2008	12'
1989	Cuarteto de Fagotes	Caracas	5'
1988	Ricercare, for percussionist (solo)	Edgar Saume – Galería de Arte Nacional, Caracas	25'
1988	Motet, for eight-voice mixed Choir	Coro de la Universidad Experimental del Táchira (UNET). Director: Alejandro Rivas. Universidad Central de Venezuela, Caracas	9'
1987	Ricercare II, for piano	Alain Nevaux – IV Festival Atempo-Caracas, 1997	10'
1987	Cuarteto de cuerdas No. I, for piano. Madrid	Cuarteto América – VIII Festival Atempo-Caracas, 2001	15'
1986	Concertare a Tre. Clarinet, vibraphone and piano	Círculo de Bellas Artes, Madrid	13'
1982	Cantar Dos, for two mixed Choirs. Text by Charles Baudelaire	Coro de la Universidad Experimental del Táchira (UNET). Director: Rubén Rivas	5'
1977	Concertare a Due, for two guitars	Paris	7'
1977	Cantar Uno, for mixed Choir. Text: Cantar de los Cantares. London	Coro de la Universidad Experimental del Táchira (UNET). Director: Rubén Rivas. Aula Magna de la Universidad Central de Venezuela, Caracas, 1997	13'
1975	Variaciones para piano	London	6'
