= Howard Sandroff =

American composer, sound artist, sculptor, and music educator (born 1949)

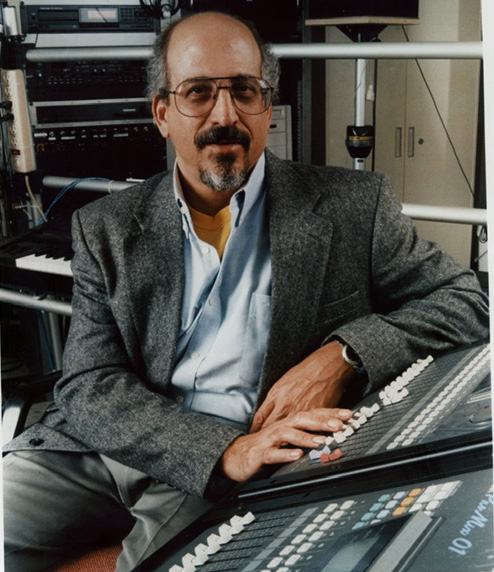
- Born: October 28, 1949; Chicago, Illinois, United States of America
- Occupations: Composer, Professor
- Works: List of works

Howard Sandroff (born October 28, 1949, in Chicago, Illinois) is an American composer, sound artist, sculptor, and music educator.

Sandroff studied at the Chicago Musical College of Roosevelt University and the Massachusetts Institute of Technology. His composition instructors included Robert Lombardo and Ben Johnston. He has received composition and research fellowships from the National Endowment for the Arts, the University of Chicago, and the Yamaha Music Foundation. He founded, directed, and conducted Chicago's New Art Ensemble. In 2016, Sandroff retired from the University of Chicago where he was Director of the Computer Music Studio and Senior Lecturer in Music. He is also a professor emeritus of Audio Arts & Acoustics at Columbia College Chicago.

In June 1996, Pierre Boulez invited Sandroff to attend the dedication of the new IRCAM facility at the Centre Georges Pompidou. His composition Tephillah, for clarinet and computer, was performed at the dedication by Alain Damiens, clarinetist with the Ensemble Intercontemporain. Sandroff has collaborated with clarinetist John Bruce Yeh, performing Boulez's 1985 work for clarinet and electronics, Dialogue de l'ombre double.

Among Sandroff's compositions are works for solo instruments, chamber music ensembles, and orchestra, often incorporating live or recorded electronic music. His works have been performed throughout the world in concerts and festivals such as New Music America, Aspen Music Festival, New Music Chicago, the International Computer Music Conference, the Smithsonian Institution, and the World Saxophone Congress.

== Works ==
- La Joie (The Joy) for clarinet trio, 1996
- Chant de femme, for flutes and electronic sounds, 1996
- Chorale for saxophone quartet, 1994
- Tephilla for clarinet and computer controlled audio processors, 1990
- Eulogy for alto saxophone, 1989
- Concerto for Electronic Wind Instrument and String Orchestra, 1988
- The Bride's Complaint for soprano and computer generated electronics, 1987
- Adagio for piano, 1985
- Concerto for Piano and Orchestra, 1983
- ...there is a decided lack of enthusiasm at my end of the leash. for two pianos and electronic sounds on tape, 1981
