= John Bruce Yeh =

American clarinetist (born 1957)

- Born: 1957 (age 68–69); Washington DC
- Education: Juilliard School
- Occupation: Clarinetist
- Spouse(s): Jody Shinbrod Yeh (div.); Teresa Reilly
- Children: 3 including Molly Yeh

John Bruce Yeh
- Traditional Chinese: 葉強
- Simplified Chinese: 叶强
Transcriptions
Standard Mandarin
- Hanyu Pinyin: Yè Qiáng

John Bruce Yeh (born 1957) is an American clarinetist. He has been the assistant principal clarinetist and E-flat clarinetist of the Chicago Symphony Orchestra since 1977. Yeh is the founder and director of the chamber ensemble, Chicago Pro Musica, whose first recording, Stravinsky's L'Histoire du soldat, won the 1985 Grammy Award for the Best New Classical Artist.

== Early life ==
Yeh was born in Washington DC, although he grew up in Los Angeles, California. Yeh's parents were originally from China. Yeh's father was a scientist and a singer. Yeh's mother was a scientist and a pianist.

== Education ==
Yeh initially studied as a pre-med student at UCLA and also played in local chamber music ensembles and youth symphonies. After two years at UCLA, Yeh transferred to the Juilliard School in New York City from which he graduated in 1980.

== Career ==
In 1977, at age 19, Yeh was hired by Georg Solti as a clarinetist for the Chicago Symphony Orchestra. He started as solo bass clarinetist and two years later was appointed assistant principal and E-flat clarinetist.

While in New York Yeh became a founding member of the New York New Music Ensemble and retained an interest in contemporary music throughout his career. In 1979 he founded the chamber ensemble, Chicago Pro Musica and remains its director. The ensemble's first recording, Stravinsky's L'Histoire du soldat, won the 1985 Grammy Award for the Best New Classical Artist. He has also collaborated with composer and electronic musician Howard Sandroff, performing and recording Pierre Boulez's 1985 work for clarinet and electronics, Dialogue de l'ombre double. Yeh cofounded INVENTIONS, a visual-musical quartet.

== Personal life ==
Yeh's first wife was Jody Shinbrod Yeh, a social worker, who is of Jewish descent; they have two daughters including Molly. Yeh's second wife is Teresa Reilly, a clarinetist, and together they have a daughter. Yeh, his wife Reilly, and his daughter Molly, a percussionist, perform together on the album Synergy released by Naxos Records in the Naxos Wind Band Classics series.

== Recordings ==
Yeh's recordings include:

- Stravinsky: L'Histoire du soldat (also includes works by Rimsky-Korsakov, Walton, Hasenohrl, and Nielsen) – Chicago Pro Musica: George Vosburgh (cornet, trumpet); Daniel Gingrich (horn); Jay Friedman (trombone); Richard Graef (flute); John Bruce Yeh (clarinet); Willard Elliot, (bassoon); Albert Igolnikov (violin); Donald Moline (cello); Joseph Guasgafeste (bass); Easley Blackwood (piano); Donald Koss (percussion). Label: Reference Recordings
- Hindemith: Clarinet Chamber Music – John Bruce Yeh (clarinet), Easley Blackwood (piano), Amelia Piano Trio. Label: Cedille Records
- Boulez: Dialogues With My Shadow (also includes works by Sandroff, Donald Martino, and Rami Levin) – John Bruce Yeh (clarinet), Howard Sandroff (computer). Label: Koch International Classics
- Synergy (works by Daugherty, Burritt, Gillingham, David, and McAllister) – John Bruce Yeh (clarinet), Teresa Reilly (clarinet), Molly Yeh (percussionist), Columbus State University Wind Ensemble. Label: Naxos Records

== Awards ==
- Frank Sinatra Musical Performance Award.
- 1986 Grammy Award for Best New Classical Artist
