= Epitaphium =

An epitaphium is a Latin epitaph.

Epitaphium may refer to the following works:

== Music ==
- Epitaphium (Stravinsky)
- Epitaphium (Waterhouse)
- Epitaphium Carpentarij, by Marc-Antoine Charpentier
- Epitaphium Joannis Hunyadi, by Kodály
- Epitaphium temporum pereunti, by Bronius Kutavicius
- Epitaphium Stanisław Wiechowicz in memoriam, Symphony No. 2 for choir and orchestra Krzysztof Meyer
- Epitaphium – Children of the Sun, by Jeffrey Lewis

== Poetry ==
- Epitaphium Citharistriae, by Victor Plarr
- Epitaphium Ansae reginae, to Ansa, Queen of the Lombards
