= Cummings ist der Dichter =

- by Pierre Boulez
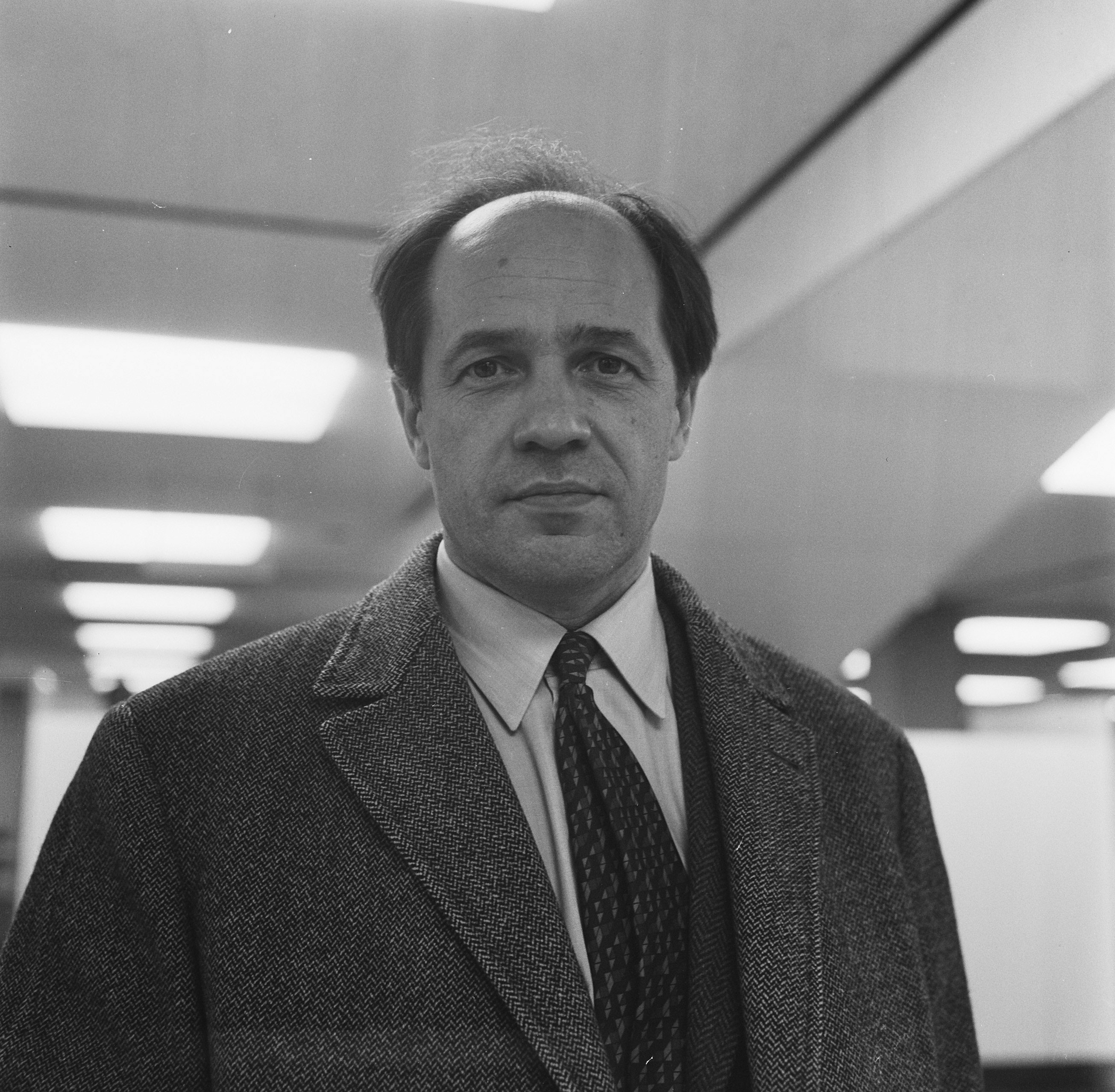
- Boulez in 1968
- Composed: 1970; revised 1986
- Performed: September 1970
- Published: 1976
- Movements: 1
- Scoring: mixed choir and instrumental ensemble

Cummings ist der Dichter (Cummings is the Poet) is a 1970 composition for mixed choir and instrumental ensemble by Pierre Boulez, based on a poem by E. E. Cummings.

== Background ==
Boulez was initially introduced to the poetry of Cummings in 1952 by John Cage during a visit to a New York bookstore. Boulez recalled that he immediately felt that he "had a pretty direct relationship with the poetry of Cummings," but "did not feel sufficiently well acquainted with the English language to tackle one of his poems." During the late 1960s, he considered setting five Cummings poems to music, and began composing a Cantate pour Baryton et petit Orchestre, using the poem that would eventually appear in Cummings ist der Dichter. However, he became dissatisfied with the piece, and subsequently reworked the instrumental passages into Domaines.

In 1970, Boulez completed the first version of Cummings ist der Dichter, a ten-minute work for mixed choir and instrumental ensemble, based on a poem titled "birds( here inven/", taken from Cummings's 1935 collection No Thanks. The poem is typical of Cummings's work in that it employs an unusual layout on the page, with a highly personal use of word fragmentation and parentheses. Boulez later reflected: "what interests me is not to transcribe Cummings's discoveries literally into music, but to find a transcription of his world in my own." He described the resulting work as having "a form which has its roots in the poem but which, of course, can also be grasped completely independently from the poem." The 1970 version requires two conductors who at times function somewhat independently, and, like a number of other compositions of this period, it employs aleatoric techniques in sections.

In 1986, Boulez completed a revised version of the piece which requires 16 solo voices or a mixed choir of up to 48 voices, plus an expanded ensemble. In addition, the performance indeterminacies in this version were eliminated and replaced with fully written-out passages.

Cummings ist der Dichter is unique in that it was Boulez's first and only setting of English poetry. Writer Peter F. Stacey stated that Cummings's poems "made a refreshing change from the terse and complex poetry of Mallarmé," while Boulez himself would later note that his exposure to the poems helped him "a great deal in rediscovering a certain freshness." Musicologist Susan Bradshaw described the work as "an almost autobiographical reflection of the progressive developments in Boulez's musical thinking during this period: developments that were soon to explode in the creative revival of the 1970s."

== Instrumentation ==
1970 version:

- mixed choir of 16 voices
- one flute
- four oboes
- one bassoon
- three horns
- two trumpets
- two trombones
- one violin
- three violas
- three cellos
- one double bass
- three harps

1986 version:

- 16 solo voices or mixed choir of up to 48 voices
- two flutes
- one oboe
- one cor anglais
- two clarinets
- one bass clarinet
- two bassoons
- two horns
- two trumpets
- two trombones
- one bass tuba
- three violins
- two violas
- two cellos
- one double bass
- three harps

== Premiere and publication ==
Cummings ist der Dichter was premiered during September 1970 at a concert in Ulm, Germany, with Clytus Gottwald conducting the Schola Cantorum Stuttgart and Boulez conducting the instrumental ensemble. Both versions were published by Universal Edition.

== Origins of title ==
According to Boulez, prior to the premiere in Ulm, the concert organizers contacted him and requested the title of the work so that they could print the programs in advance. He replied, in his then-rudimentary German: "I have not yet found a title for the work but all that I can tell you now is that Cummings is the poet I have chosen." The organizer interpreted this to mean that the work's title was "Cummings is the poet" (in German, "Cummings ist der Dichter"), and printed the program as such. Boulez allowed the mistake to stand, noting: "I felt there could not possibly be a better title than that, which had come about completely by accident."

== Reception ==
In a 1977 review, Arnold Whittall described the form of the work as "fluid yet precise, unpredictable and therefore intensely dramatic," and commented: "No other work of Boulez's, not even the early cantata Le Soleil des eaux, seems to me to demonstrate so clearly his personal synthesis and transformation of stylistic elements that derive from both Webern and Debussy." Reviewing a 2016 Proms concert, Mark Berry of Seen and Heard International wrote: "I had the impression of a combination of certain qualities of Boulez's earlier choral music... with the different concerns of somewhat later musical language.... There was a true sense... of cummings-like wonder."
