= Livre pour quatuor =

- by Pierre Boulez
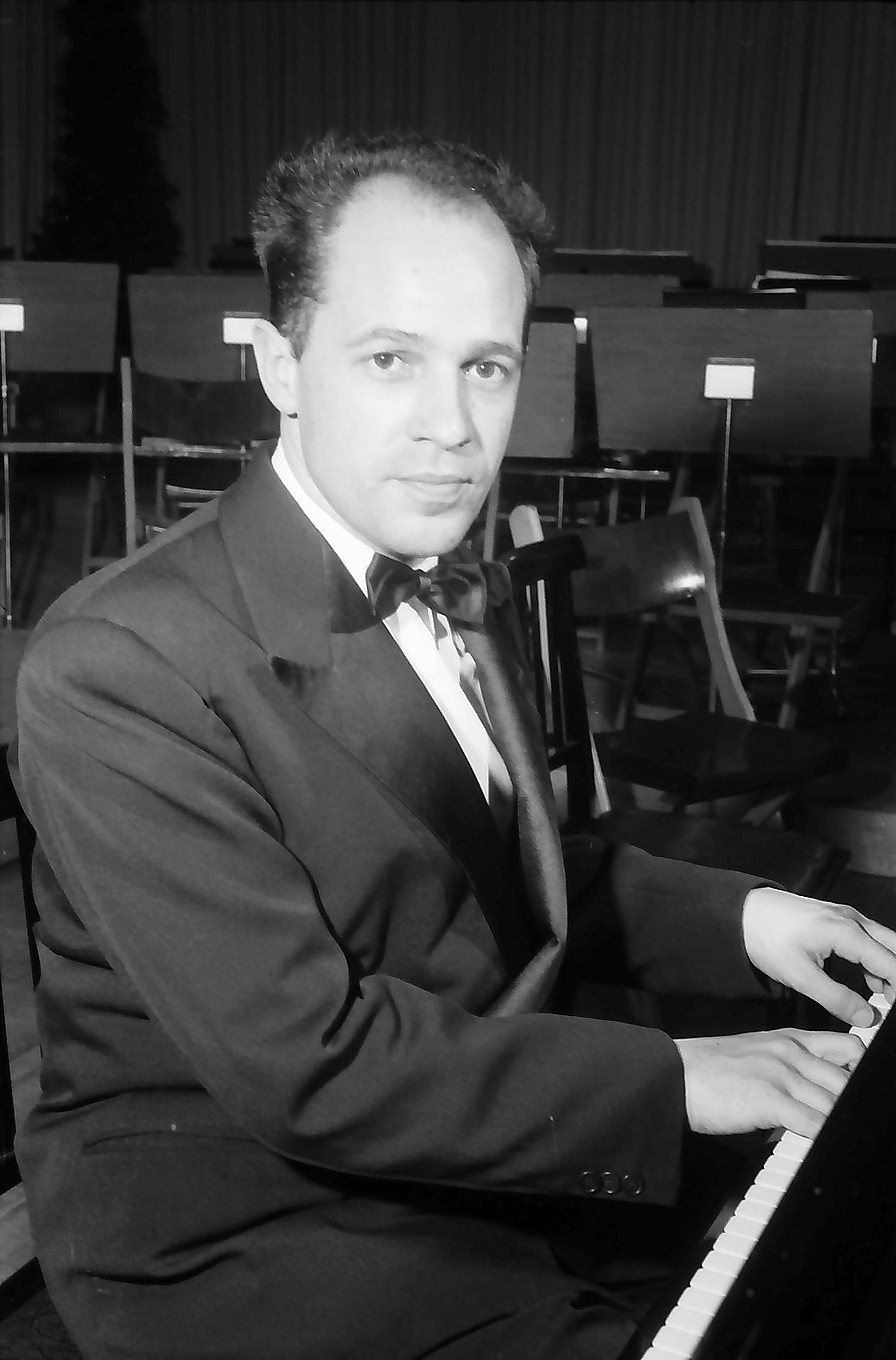
- Boulez in 1956
- Composed: 1948–1949; revised 2012
- Performed: 15 October 1955
- Movements: 6
- Scoring: string quartet

Livre pour quatuor (Book for quartet) is a composition for string quartet by Pierre Boulez.

== Background ==
The bulk of Livre pour quatuor was composed during 1948–1949, immediately following completion of the Second Piano Sonata, and contemporary with the publication of the essay "Proposals." Boulez's first instrumental piece without piano, it can be seen as marking a transition between the hyper-expressivity and reliance on traditional forms found in the earlier works, culminating in the Second Sonata, with the serial experiments that followed. In a 1950 letter to John Cage, Boulez acknowledged the influence of the older composer, stating: "Meeting you made me end a 'classical' period with my quartet."

Sketches for Livre pour quatuor reveal Boulez's initial experiments with applying serial techniques to both pitch and rhythm. In an interview, he recalled that he "began by using completely independent schemes in which pitches, durations and rhythms were combined at first starting from cells, but these cells became so independent that they virtually became rhythmic series." Boulez would continue these experiments in the works that followed, namely Polyphonie X, Deux Études for tape, and the first book of Structures.

Livre pour quatuor was also the first of Boulez's compositions to reflect the influence of poet Stéphane Mallarmé. Boulez noted that the idea for the quartet came to him while reading Mallarmé's Igitur and Un Coup de Dés, during which he came to see the poetry as forming "a continuity from which sections could be detached because they had meaning and validity even when taken out of the continuous context in which they were placed." Boulez's quartet was initially conceived as a group of six separable movements, or "feuillets" (leaves), from which the performers would select the ones they wanted to play. (Although the quartet's title suggests an homage to Mallarmé's Livre, in which the pages could be read in any order, Boulez recalled that he did not read the poem until after its publication in 1957.) He would continue to explore such ideas in later works, such as the Third Piano Sonata.

The quartet remained in a state of flux for many years, as Boulez grappled with its technical and expressive challenges. Although he completed movements 1 (in two parts), 2, 3 (in three parts), and 5 by mid-1949, movement 6 was not completed until 1959, while movement 4 remained incomplete. He revised the piece in 1959 with the help of members of the Parrenin Quartet, and, during 2002–2012, he continued the revisions, working with the Diotima Quartet.

Over the years, as Boulez attended performances of individual sections of the work, he grew dissatisfied with it due to the numerous performative challenges resulting from his inexperience at the time it was written. He concluded that it "posed great interpretative problems for a quartet," and suggested that "you would need a conductor to solve them." In the late 1960s, he withdrew the work from his catalogue, requesting that it no longer be performed except by quartets that had already rehearsed and played it, and began rewriting it for string orchestra. His recomposition of the two-part first movement became Livre pour cordes (1968), while rewrites of the remaining movements remained forever incomplete.

== Music ==
Musicologist Richard Toop observed that, in comparison with the works that preceded it, Livre pour quatuor lacks the "explosive dynamism" of the Second Piano Sonata as well as the "seductive lyricism" of Le Soleil des eaux. Boulez himself commented: "The mere fact of using a string quartet brought with it a certain reticence, a certain restraint." On the other hand, the music is characterized by rapid timbral and dynamic changes, in conjunction with the use of a wide variety of string techniques (sul ponticello, pizzicato, col legno, etc.), as well as a tendency for the four instrumental voices to cross, blurring their traditional registral identities. Boulez also noted the contrast between passages that he characterized as "austere" and "rigid" with others that are more "supple," and that produce "an impression of flexibility and improvisation."

== Premiere and publication ==
The work was premiered in fragments, beginning on 15 October 1955, when the Marschner Quartet played movements 1 and 2 at a concert in Donaueschingen, Germany. Movements 5 and 6 were performed on 9 September 1961 in Darmstadt, Germany, by the Hamann Quartet, while the Parrenin Quartet played movements 3 in Darmstadt on 8 July 1962. Movements 1, 2, 3, 5, and 6 were first performed together on 31 March 1985 by the Arditti Quartet. The score was published by Heugel.

== Reconstruction of fourth movement ==
In 2018, at the invitation of violinist Irvine Arditti, composer Philippe Manoury and musicologist Jean-Louis Leleu worked together on reconstructing and finishing the incomplete fourth movement. The entire quartet, including the fourth movement, was premiered on 10 April 2018, by both the Arditti Quartet at Berlin's Pierre Boulez Saal and the Diotima Quartet at the Philharmonie de Paris. A complete edition of the score was published by Leduc.

== Reception ==
Reviewing a recording of the work by the Diotima Quartet, Andrew Clements wrote: "It's music that, as the composer himself said, veers between 'intentionally austere bareness' and 'the most proliferating exuberance'... It's sometimes rapturously beautiful, sometimes chillingly detached; in many ways it's the most revealingly personal work that Boulez ever composed." In a review of a live performance, Richard Fairman of the Financial Times stated that the piece "is no doubt meticulously organised, though the listener is pushed to hear how," and noted its "intricate, seemingly random detail."
