= Double Canon (Stravinsky) =

Short composition for string quartet by Igor Stravinsky

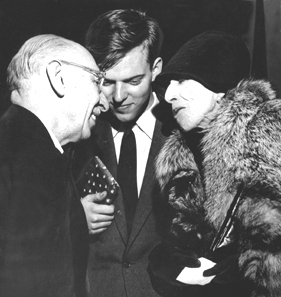
Stravinsky with Jurij Moskvitin (middle) and Karen Blixen (right), City Hall of Copenhagen, 25 May 1959

The Double Canon (Raoul Dufy in Memoriam) is a short composition for string quartet by Igor Stravinsky, composed in 1959. It lasts only about a minute and a quarter in performance.

== History ==
Although it is a memorial piece for the painter Raoul Dufy, who had died on 23 March 1953, the Double Canon is not a personal tribute, for the two men had never met. The work originated as a duet for flute and clarinet, composed in Venice in September 1959 as a souvenir piece in response to a request for an autograph. Later expanded for string quartet, it had its first performance at a Stravinsky festival in New York, either on 20 December 1959, or else on 10 January 1960 in a concert also featuring the premiere of the Movements for piano and orchestra.

== Analysis ==
The Double Canon is exceptional in Stravinsky's twelve-tone compositions in that it uses transposed forms of the row. Stravinsky's habitual practice was to use only untransposed row forms.

The first five notes of Stravinsky's series for the Double Canon are equivalent to the five-note set of In Memoriam Dylan Thomas, and also are closely related to sets used in Agon, Epitaphium, and A Sermon, a Narrative and a Prayer. It is representative of the earliest phase of Stravinsky's serial practice, when he had not yet developed the technique of hexachordal rotation that characterizes his music written from the Movements onward.
