= Clarinet Concerto (Carter) =

1996 musical composition by Elliott Carter

The American composer Elliott Carter wrote his Clarinet Concerto in 1996 to celebrate the 20th anniversary of the Ensemble InterContemporain, who premiered the work in January 1997 under the direction of Pierre Boulez. Alain Damiens was the soloist in this performance; his premiere recording of the work with the Ensemble InterContemporain under David Robertson was released in 1999.

The clarinet concerto lasts just under 20 minutes and is in seven movements which play without a break:

1. Scherzando (mm. 2-43)
2. Deciso (mm. 49–87)
3. Tranquillo (mm. 91–152)
4. Presto (mm. 167–226)
5. Largo (mm. 231–264)
6. Giocoso (mm. 279–373)
7. Agitato (mm. 387–447)

As in many of Carter's later works, the full 18-man chamber orchestra rarely plays tutti; instead the clarinet soloist takes part in a sequence of dialogues with subsections of the orchestra (piano, harp and pitched percussion in the first movement; unpitched percussion in the second (vibraphone, marimba); muted brass in the third; woodwinds in the fourth; strings in the fifth; open brass in the sixth; and tutti in the seventh), into which the rest of the ensemble interjects occasional commentary.

The concerto has received four commercial recordings; in addition to Damiens', recordings with Michael Collins, Simon Aldrich and Paul Meyer have also been released.

Pierre Boulez is featured conducting rehearsals of the concerto in the film A Labyrinth of Time. He is also shown discussing the work with Carter.
