= Philippe Fénelon =

French classical composer

Philippe Fénelon (born 23 November 1952, Suèvres, Loir-et-Cher) is a French classical composer.

== Works, editions and recordings ==
Opera

- 1984 : Le Chevalier imaginaire, in prologue and 2 acts after Cervantès and Kafka. Théâtre du Châtelet.
- 1992 : Salammbô, in 3 acts after Flaubert. Opéra de Paris, premiere conducted by Gary Bertini
- 1998 : Les Rois, in 3 acts after Cortázar. Grand Théâtre de Bordeaux.
- 2005 : Faust, 2 acts after Nikolaus Lenau. Théâtre du Capitole de Toulouse.
- 2010 : La Cerisaie, 2 scenes and epilogue after Chekhov. Premiere at the Bolshoi 2010 (in concert).
- 2012 : JJR, Citoyen de Genève, on Jean-Jacques Rousseau

Ballet

- Yamm (2000); choreography by Lionel Hoche; produced at l'Opéra de Paris

Chamber music

- Caprice for viola solo (1977, revised 1982)
- Nit for viola solo (1994)
- Epha for bassoon and viola (2000)
- Fragment II for basset horn and viola (2002)
