= Livre pour cordes =

- by Pierre Boulez
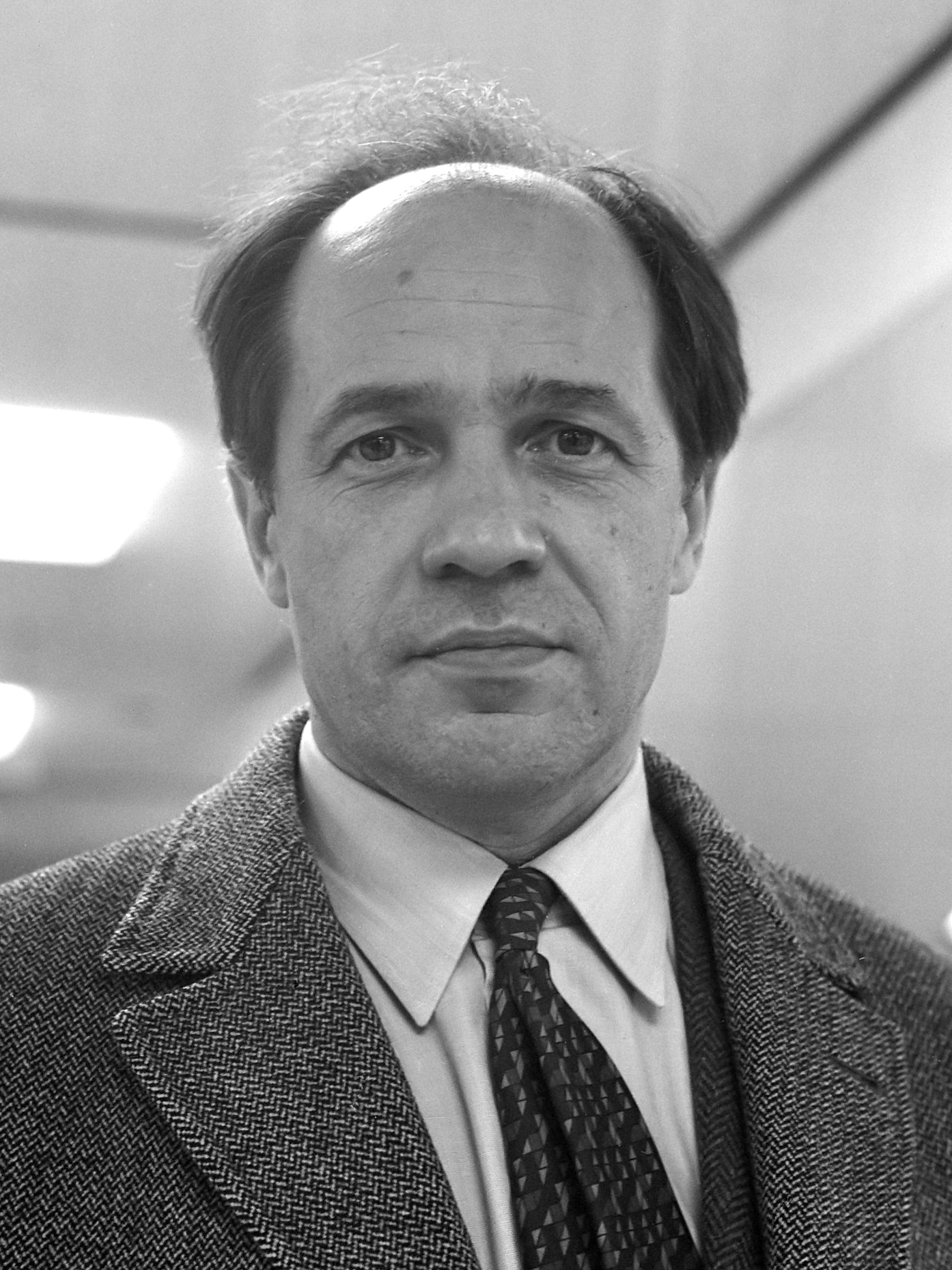
- Boulez in 1968
- Composed: 1968; revised 1989
- Performed: 1 December 1968
- Movements: 2
- Scoring: string orchestra

Livre pour cordes (Book for strings) is a 1968 composition for string orchestra by Pierre Boulez. It is a revised and expanded version of the first two movements of the composer's Livre pour quatuor.

== Background ==
Livre pour quatuor (1948–1949), Boulez's only work for string quartet, presented numerous performative challenges resulting from the composer's inexperience at the time it was written. Boulez recalled that the quartet "posed great interpretative problems for a quartet," and suggested that "you would need a conductor to solve them." In the late 1960s, he withdrew the work from publication, requesting that it no longer be performed except by quartets that had already rehearsed and played it, and began rewriting it for string orchestra (16 first violins, 14 second violins, 12 violas, 10 cellos, 8 double basses), starting with the two-part first movement (1a, "Variation" and 1b, "Mouvement"). He recalled:

I felt that the best way of bringing out everything in the original composition would be to orchestrate it. But in an orchestral work one can no longer have the same point of view; so I rethought the music completely, and in the two movements of the Livre for string quartet that became a Livre for string orchestra... there is such a degree of proliferation, and such an additional weight of ideas, that it is almost a new piece.

According to Boulez biographer Dominique Jameux, Livre pour cordes sounds "infinitely better" than the version for string quartet, although he acknowledged that it lacks some of the earlier work's "extraordinary vigour, vehemence and alacrity." Writer Paul Griffiths called the work "an elaborate amplification which spreads in varying densities around the original, giving it veils of fine counterpoint and harmonic breadth." Although Boulez revised the score in 1989, he abandoned the project, and chose not to rescore the remaining movements of the quartet.

== Premiere and publication ==
Livre pour cordes was premiered on 1 December 1968 in London, at a concert by the New Philharmonia, with Boulez conducting. The revised version was first heard on 12 May 1989 at a concert in Los Angeles, performed by the Los Angeles Philharmonic, conducted by Boulez. The score was published by Heugel.

== Reception ==
In a review of a 2010 concert by the Chicago Symphony Orchestra, conducted by Boulez, Steve Smith of The New York Times described Livre pour cordes as "crepuscular, fitful and dreamy by turns... a compelling display for the Chicago strings," while Los Angeles Times reviewer Mark Swed called it "exquisite, eventful music, full of darting gestures and tiny brilliant explosions." Reviewing a 2018 London Symphony Orchestra concert, Bachtrack's Chris Garlick portrayed the piece as "a work of dense dodecaphony which, despite itself, sounds refined and sensuous almost in the manner of Debussy himself."

Composer and writer James Harley called the piece "a concentrated, engaging work," and suggested that a precedent might be Alban Berg's Lyric Suite, a string quartet part of which was rescored for string orchestra.
