= Jacques Lenot =

French composer (born 1945)

Jacques Lenot (born 29 August 1945) is a French composer. His compositional techniques are derived from serialism.
