= Ainsi parla Zarathoustra (Boulez) =

1974 music composed by Pierre Boulez

- Incidental music by Pierre Boulez
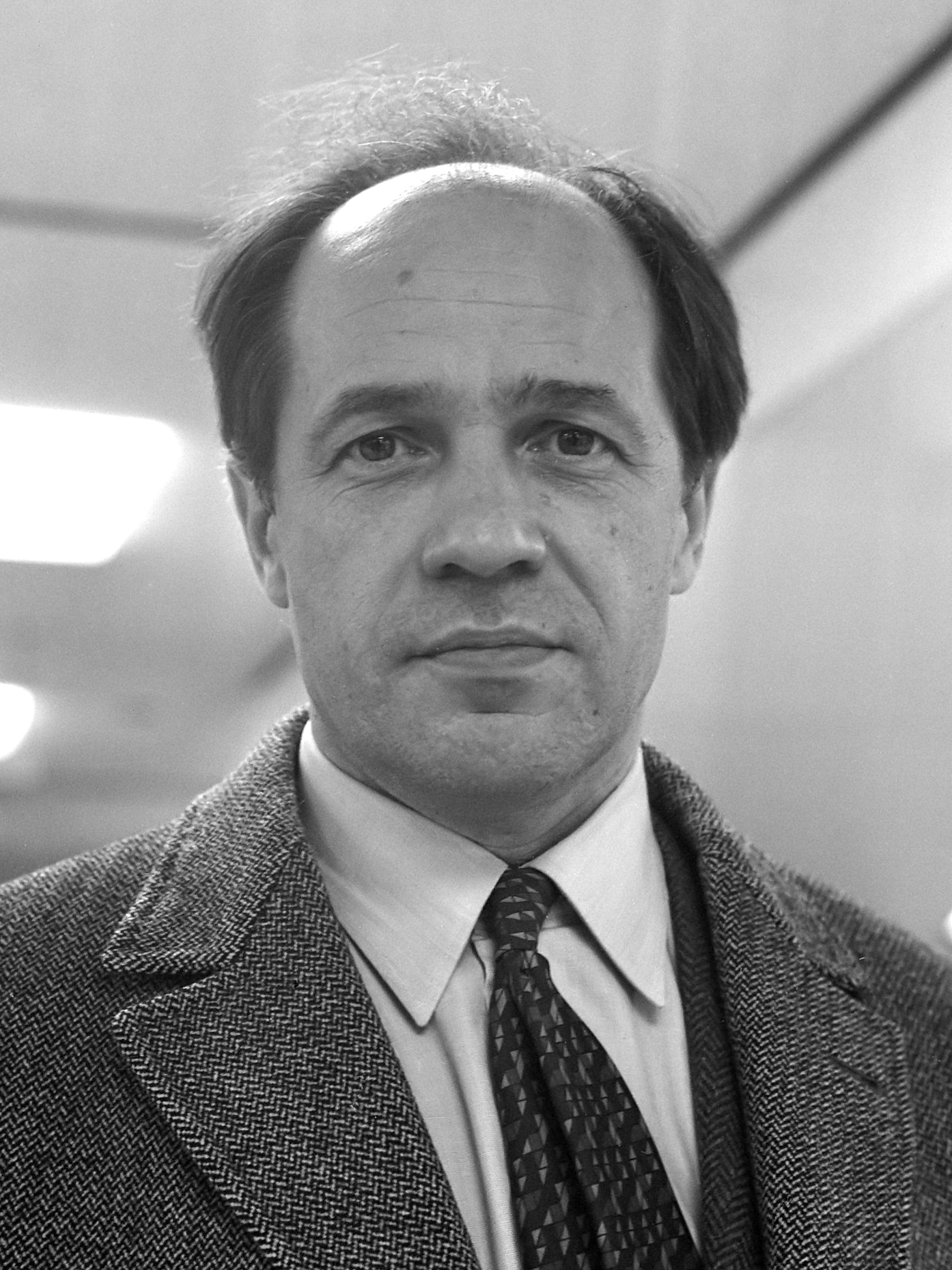
- The composer in 1968
- English: Thus Spoke Zarathustra
- Composed: 1974
- Performed: 6 November 1974: Théâtre d'Orsay, Paris
- Scoring: voice and ensemble

Ainsi parla Zarathoustra is an incidental music composed by Pierre Boulez in October 1974 for the theatre Renaud-Barrault. Boulez scored the work for a solo voice and an instrumental ensemble. It was first performed at the Théâtre d'Orsay in Paris on 6 November 1974. Sketches and scores are kept by the Foundation Paul Sacher in Basel, while images and films of the production are in the Bibliothèque nationale de France.

== Background and history ==
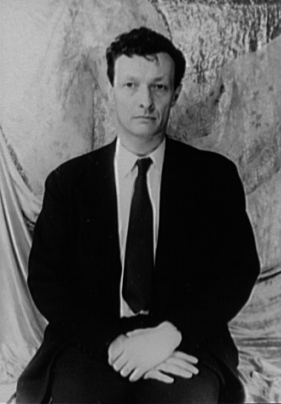
Barrault in 1958

Jean-Louis Barrault, the director of the theatre company, created a scenic version of Nietzsche's Also sprach Zarathustra and requested music from Boulez with whom he had collaborated for years. Boulez was from 1945 to 1955 musical director of the company, arranging and conducting incidental music and writing some himself. In 1954/55 Boulez had composed incidental music for the Oresteia in three parts, directed by Barrault. For Ainsi parla Zarathoustra, Barrault wrote detailed instructions for the music, which Boulez considered and often followed. While the French text based on Nietzsche's work by Georges-Arthur Goldschmidt was printed in 1972, a version with Barrault's additional instructions was published by Gallimard in the series Le Manteau d'Arlequin in 1975.

The production was first performed at the Théâtre d'Orsay in Paris on 6 November 1974. The music remains unpublished; sketches and scores are extant in the collection Pierre Boulez of the Foundation Paul Sacher in Basel, while images and films of the production are held in part by the Bibliothèque nationale de France.

== Music ==
Nietzsche's text has inspired several composers. Gustav Mahler based the slow movement of his Third Symphony on the "Lied der Nacht" (Song of the night). Richard Strauss composed the symphonic poem Also sprach Zarathustra. Wolfgang Rihm's Third Symphony drew on Nietzsche's text for inspiration as well.

Boulez was especially interested in the episode "L'éternel retour" for which he composed music which has been described as at the same time static and moving forward ("in sich stehende und doch weiter schwingende Musik"). On a foundation of static sounds, little ornaments in flutes and oboes arise, coloured by similar motifs in harp and piano. Taking "retour" (return) literally, the music is heard already before Part 3, which has the scene for which Barrault requested it, and several more times throughout Part 3, almost as a leitmotiv. Other sections (Satzzonen), marked by letters and numbers, can also be repeated flexibly.
