= Éclat =

- by Pierre Boulez
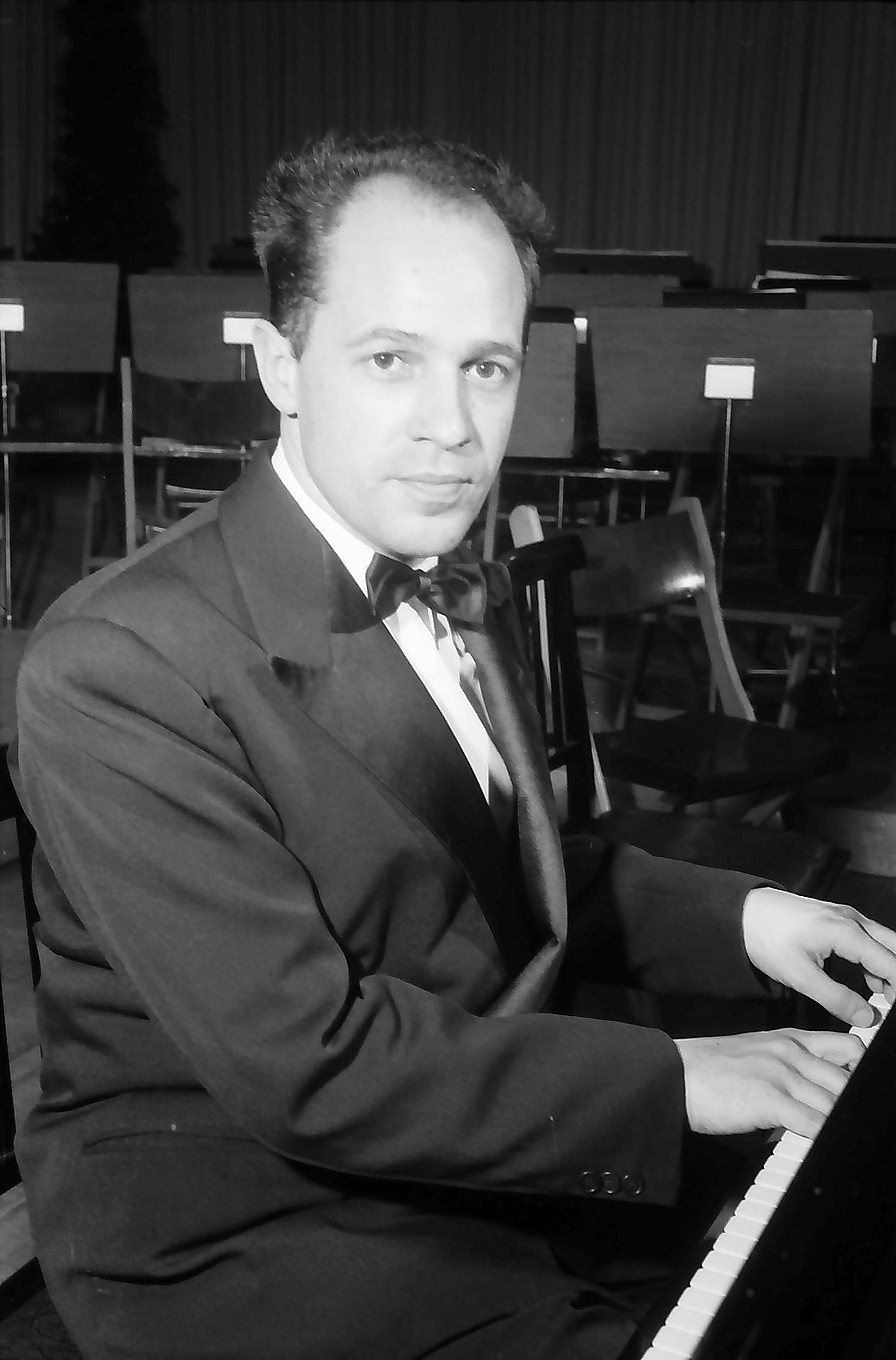
- Boulez in 1956
- Composed: 1964–65
- Performed: 26 March 1965
- Movements: 1
- Scoring: Fifteen instruments

Éclat is a composition for fifteen instruments by Pierre Boulez.

== Background ==
Éclat was written to commemorate both Boulez's 40th birthday and the opening of the Los Angeles County Museum of Art. The music had its origins in a discarded solo piano work titled Don, and can be heard as a continuation of both the sound world of Pli selon pli, in terms of its use of pitched percussion, and the mobile aspects of the Third Piano Sonata.

== Instrumentation ==
The ensemble consists of solo piano plus two instrumental groups, one comprising eight plucked or struck instruments (celesta, harp, glockenspiel, vibraphone, mandolin, guitar, cimbalom, and tubular bells), the other featuring six sustaining instruments (alto flute, cor anglais, trumpet, trombone, viola, and cello). Boulez recalled: "I wanted to make sound only with resonating instruments and with a variety of instruments whose resonance was varied... I had the sound idea before the work was written."

== Music ==
Consisting of a single movement with a duration of eight to ten minutes, Éclat contains both pulse-oriented, fully-notated music, and floating, aleatoric passages; during the latter, the conductor assumes an unusually active role, in that he must actually "construct [the work], to take his bearings and to choose from among the options open to him, and to interact with his instrumental ensemble like a concerto soloist." Regarding the title of the piece, Boulez noted that the word "éclat" can mean "fragment," "explosion," and "reflections of light," and commented: "all these words have different meanings which can refer to the form of the music, to its content, and to its poetic expression." Accordingly, the sound world is characterized by nervous trills and frenetic activity that stand in contrast with suspended, dying resonances that fade into silence. The result is an atmosphere of "lightning brilliance, explosive force, and shimmering brightness."

== Premiere and publication ==
Éclat was premiered on 26 March 1965, at the University of California, Los Angeles, where it was performed by members of the Los Angeles Philharmonic conducted by Boulez. The score was published by Universal Edition.

== Éclat/Multiples ==
During the years that followed, Boulez expanded Éclat into Éclat/Multiples, a work of roughly 25 minutes duration for a larger ensemble. Although Boulez apparently viewed it as a work-in-progress, it was premiered in 1970, and was also published by Universal Edition. Éclat/Multiples remained unfinished at the time of the composer's death, and unpublished manuscripts at the Paul Sacher Foundation reveal that the composer had intended to drastically expand the material even further.

== Reception ==
Igor Stravinsky called Éclat "another small masterpiece," and commented: "The score does not list the conductor's part along with those of the other performers, yet it is composed just as any of the instrumental parts are composed, and is, in fact, the most interesting of all... Eclat is not only creative music, but creative conducting as well, which is unique." Reviewing a 1996 performance, Mark Swed wrote: "Boulez here is hardly different from, say, Teller, when the magician... does something you simply can't believe. Boulez leads Eclat, written for all manner of resonating percussion, that way. His conducting looks like sleight of hand, a remote-control signaling of a dazzling array of thrilling resonances. There were literally oohs and ahs from the audience."
