= Erik Bosgraaf =

Dutch musician

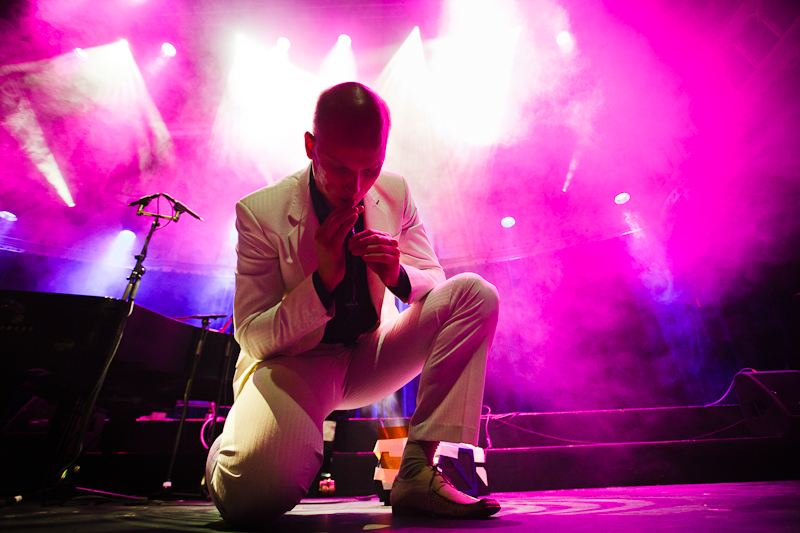
- Born: Erik Bosgraaf; 9 May 1980 (age 45); Drachten, Netherlands
- Occupations: Musician, musicologist

Erik Bosgraaf (born 9 May 1980) is a Dutch recorder player and musicologist.

== Early life ==
Bosgraaf was born in Drachten, Netherlands. He received his Master of Arts in musicology from Utrecht University in 2006. In 2007 Bosgraaf, under the supervision of musicologist Thiemo Wind, released a 3-CD-box with compositions of the Dutch composer Jacob van Eyck (1589–1657), a collection which attained unexpected commercial success and sold more than 25,000 copies. In the 2011–12 season he was nominated by Concertgebouw Amsterdam and the Centre for Fine Arts, Brussels, on behalf of the German ECHO music award organisation, to take part in the Rising Stars series for a tour of the most important concert halls in Europe.

== Career as musician ==
=== Ensemble Cordevento ===
In 2005 Bosgraaf, guitarist Izhar Elias and Italian harpsichord player Alessandro Pianu founded the ensemble Cordevento. The trio at first focused mainly on 17th-century music, then, under the same name Cordevento, the ensemble from 2008 also works as a small baroque orchestra in single strength. In this broad formation the ensemble mainly aims at 18th-century repertoire. The first CD, featuring recorder concertos by Antonio Vivaldi, was released in 2009. A CD featuring recorder transcriptions of concertos by Johann Sebastian Bach was released in 2011, and an album title La Monarcha was released in 2012.

=== As a soloist with orchestras ===
Beside his activities in chamber music Bosgraaf frequents the orchestral stage with symphony and chamber orchestras. He has worked with the Dallas Symphony Orchestra (Jaap van Zweden), Netherlands Kamerorkest (Gordan Nikolić), Residentie Orchestra (Reinbert de Leeuw), Holland Symfonia (Otto Tausk), The North-Netherlands Orchestra (Johannes Leertouwer), Dutch Radio Chamber Philharmonic, (Thierry Fischer Andreas Delfs) and Sinfonia Rotterdam (Alessandro Crudele). He often plays a mixture of early and more recent music with these orchestras. He has also performed with The Royal Wind Music. Bosgraaf made a transcription of Pierre Boulez' Dialogue de l'ombre double which was authorized by the composer. It was released in 2015. From 2024 Erik Bosgraaf is Artistic Director of the London International Festival of Early Music, most influential festival of its sort in Great Britain.

== Musical awards ==
In 2009 Bosgraaf received a Borletti-Buitoni Trust Award which enabled him amongst others to purchase a set of special recorders. In 2009 Erik and Izhar were awarded the Amsterdam Canal Festival Award. In 2011 Erik Bosgraaf received the most prestigious Dutch Music Prize, the highest national prize for music. He was also awarded the 'Golden Violin' Prize, a prize given triennially to a classical artist who has made outstanding contributions to the classical music scene of the northern Netherlands.

== Discography ==
- ‘Adriana. Her Portrait, Her Life, Her Music’ (2023) book by musicologist Thiemo Wind with 31 songs
- Loevendie and Bosgraaf:
- Nachklang - Reflex - Dance - Improvisations (Brilliant Classics 95906), 2018
- Telemann: The Trio Sonatas for Recorder, Violin & Basso Continuo (Berlin Classics 0301006BC), 2017
- Ernst Reijseger: Walking Out, soundtrack for the movie by Andrew & Alex Smith (Winter & Winter), 2017
- Telemann: The Double Concertos with Recorder, Cordevento (Brilliant Classics 95249), 2016
- Telemann: Complete Suites and Concertos for Recorder, Cordevento (Brilliant Classics 95248), 2016
- Ernst Reijseger: Salt & Fire, soundtrack for the movie by Werner Herzog (Winter & Winter, 2016)
- Willem Jeths: Recorder Concerto (Challenge Records CC 72693), 2015
- Telemann: The Recorder Sonatas (Brilliant Classics 95247), 2015
- Pierre Boulez, Tamminga/Bosgraaf: Dialogues, Dialogue de l'ombre double (Brilliant Classics 94842), 2015
- Vivaldi: The Four Seasons, Cordevento (Brilliant Classics 94637), 2013, re-release on LP 2015
- Hotel Terminus, met Saxophonist Yuri Honing (Brilliant Classics 9418), 2013
- La Monarcha, 17th century music from the Spanish territories, Cordevento (Brilliant Classics, 94252), 2012
- Bach: Concerti, Cordevento (Brilliant Classics 94296), 2011
- Vivaldi: Recorder Concertos, Cordevento (Brilliant Classics 93804), 2009
- Handel: The Recorder Sonatas (Brilliant Classics 93792), 2008
- Telemann: Twelve Fantasias, Bach: Partita (Brilliant Classics 93757), 2008
- Van Eyck: Der Fluyten Lust-hof (3-CD-set, Brilliant Classics 93391), 2007
- Big Eye, movies & music (CD & DVD, Phenom Records PH0713), 2007
- Telemann: Chamber Music with Recorder (Brilliant Classics 97411), 2025
