= Polyphonie X =

Orchestral work by Pierre Boulez

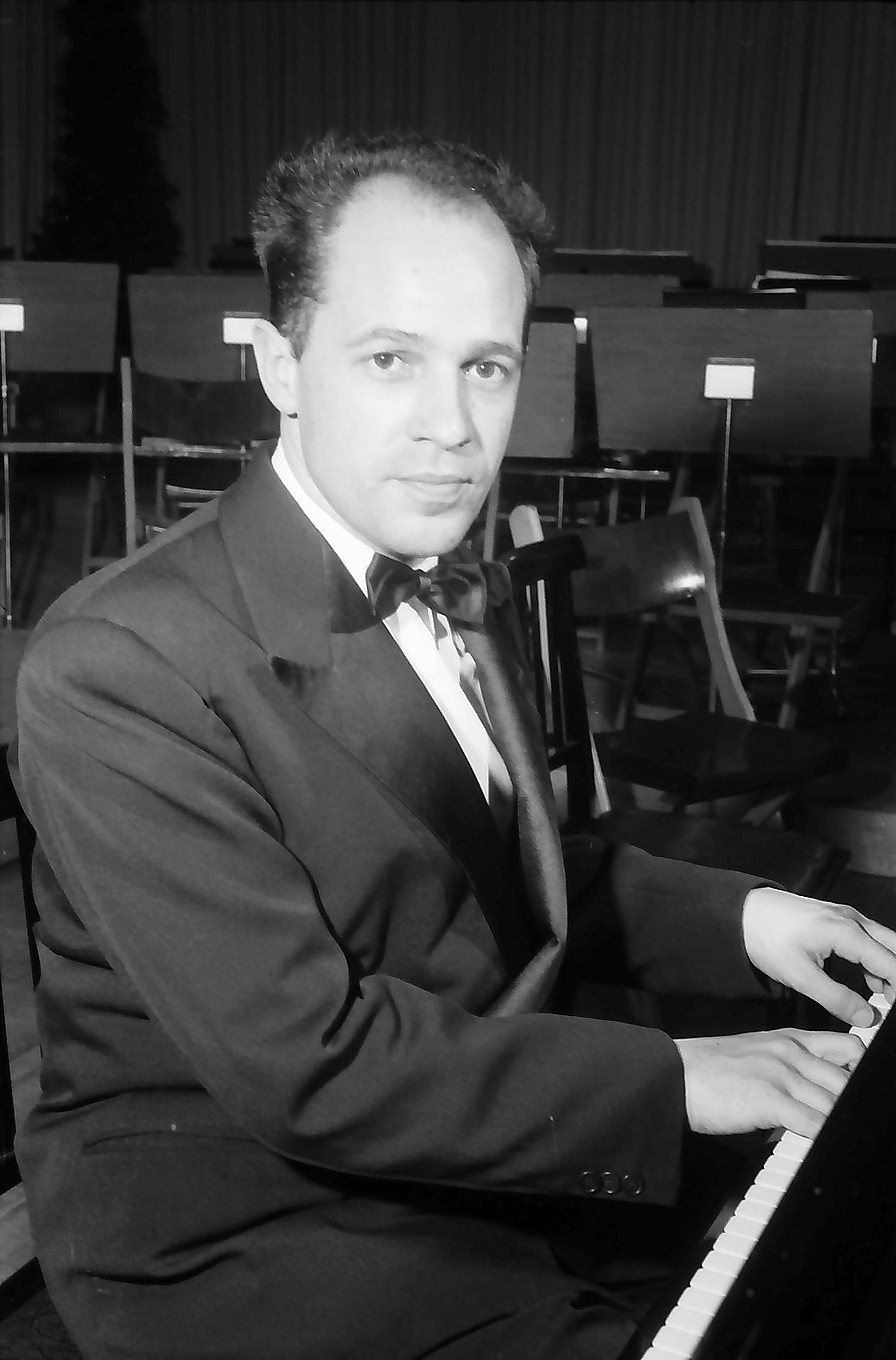
Pierre Boulez in 1956

Polyphonie X (1950–51) is a three-movement composition by Pierre Boulez for 18 instruments divided into seven groups, with a duration of roughly 15 minutes. Following the work's premiere, Boulez withdrew the score, stating that it suffered from "theoretical exaggeration". (In a 1974 interview, he referred to it as a "document" rather than a "work".)

Despite Boulez's dissatisfaction with the piece, it played a key role in his development: one writer called it "the linchpin connecting Boulez's early mastery of gesture and contour... with his later interest in large ensembles and grand forms", his "brave 'first attempt' to produce a work that exhausted a particular musical technique with large orchestral forces by developing an expansive, additive structure at the earliest stages of composition", and "one of the purest representations of Boulez's first turn toward integral serialism".

== Background ==
In 1948 and 1949, Boulez worked on Livre pour quatuor for string quartet, in which he began to explore the notion of expanding serial technique to encompass rhythms and dynamics as well as pitches. This was followed by further efforts in the direction of integral serialism in the form of the first book of Structures for two pianos, Polyphonie X, and Deux Études for tape, as well as an article titled "Eventuellement" containing detailed comments and reflections on the experience of composing the pieces.

Polyphonie X had its origins in a work that Boulez, in a letter to John Cage dated 30 December 1950, described as a piece of chamber music for 49 instruments, "a collection of 14 or 21 polyphonies (maybe more), I don't know yet, very long in duration. But one will be able to select what one likes". (Paul Griffiths noted that this concept represented an early example of what would later become known as an "open" work, in that it would have allowed the conductor to freely select a subset of pieces.) In the remainder of the letter, Boulez laid out his thoughts with regard to the serial treatment of pitch (including quarter tones), rhythmic cells, and instrumental combinations (and thus timbre). (This text, along with material from another letter to Cage, later appeared as an article titled "The System Exposed".)

== Composition ==
In the winter of 1950–1951, Heinrich Strobel visited Boulez and found him wrapped in a blanket, surrounded by charts and score pages covered with tiny notes. Strobel decided to commission a work from Boulez for the Donaueschingen Festival, to be held the coming fall, to which Boulez responded by reworking the "polyphonies" material described in the letter to Cage into what would become Polyphonie X, reducing the number of instruments to eighteen (with the ensemble divided into seven groups) and transforming the quarter-tone material into standard tuning. According to Boulez, the piece, which comprises three sections, was completed in the summer of 1951, after he wrote Structures Ia but before he wrote Structures Ib and Ic. The breakdown of the seven groups is as follows:

1. piccolo trumpet, E♭ clarinet, cor anglais
2. oboe, bass clarinet
3. flute, bassoon
4. piccolo trumpet, alto saxophone, horn, trombone
5. violin 1, cello 1
6. violin 2, cello 2
7. viola 1, viola 2, double bass

Regarding the title, Boulez explained:

X is simply X, neither a letter of the alphabet, nor a number, nor yet an algebraic symbol. It is rather a graphic symbol. I called this work Polyphonie X because it contains certain structures which intersect in the sense of augmentations and diminutions arising from their encounter, as well as similarly conceived rises and falls in the sound, and finally a series of rhythmic cells which intersect in like manner. It is moreover these cells which comprise the main ingredient of the work on the structural level.

Griffiths also suggested that the "X" reflected a preoccupation with the kind of "diagonal thinking", meaning an integration of melodic and harmonic aspects, that Boulez found in Webern's Second Cantata, a work that Boulez referred to as "open(ing) up infinite perspectives and... one of the key works... by reason of its potentialities for the future... stand(ing) at the origin of a new conception of music itself".

== Reception ==
The première of Polyphonie X occurred on 6 October 1951 at the Donaueschingen Festival, with the SWR Sinfonie-Orchester conducted by Hans Rosbaud. Antoine Goléa, who attended the concert, recalled: "Those who experienced this Donaueschingen première will remember the scandal as long as they live. Shouts, caterwauling, and other animal noises were unleashed from one half of the hall in response to applause, foot-stamping and enthusiastic bravos from the other". Strobel remained positive, commenting: "Polyphonie X was the greatest scandal I went through after the war. Unfortunately, the press, in writing about the work today, still uses some of the pejorative phrases it used at the premiere. But those who knew anything at all knew that this was a very special work, one that in both structure and color opened completely new paths". Boulez was unable to attend, but, after hearing a tape of the concert, decided to withdraw the piece. (Although Boulez initially intended to revise the work, it remained unpublished at the time of his death.) Despite this, the work received three additional performances: one in Los Angeles on 6 October 1952, conducted by Robert Craft; one in Naples on 11 May 1953, conducted by Bruno Maderna; and one in Barcelona on 27 January 1954, conducted by Jacques Bodmer. A recording of the première performance has appeared on several releases by the Denon and Col Legno labels, and a recording of the first section of the work, conducted by Maderna, was included on a release by the Stradivarius label.

== Influence ==
Shortly after the première of Polyphonie X, Strobel played a tape of the piece for Igor Stravinsky while the composer was in Baden-Baden. According to Robert Craft, Stravinsky was impressed by the "nose-thumbing force of the work", and may have been reminded of the first performance of The Rite of Spring due to the audience's forceful reaction. In the fall of 1952, prior to the performance conducted by Craft, Stravinsky assisted at several rehearsals and made an analysis of the piece. He attended the concert, and eventually Stravinsky and Boulez met and formed a relationship which would run "hot and cold" until the older composer's death.

Reflecting on his experience with Polyphonie X, Boulez wrote the following in a letter to Henri Pousseur dated late 1952: "I fear I let myself go a little too much, presently, in terms of virtuosity of pointillist technique, without referring, strictly speaking, to overall compositional sensibility. In other words, the details are not fully integrated within a perceptible whole... by limiting myself to analysis and variation, I am falling into greyness and automatic processes." In a later interview, he was again critical, stating that the work "simply shows the inadequate education I had had at the time", and calling it "very awkward and rigid", "an abstract blueprint: the instruments are only there to play the notes according to whether they belong to one register or another... there is nothing... that takes account of instrumental capacities and potential as such".

Boulez summed up the period of the early 1950s as a time of research during which he attempted to "make a clean sweep of one's heritage and start all over again from scratch". He also recalled that some of the concerts in those years, featuring his own works, as well as those by colleagues who had been influenced by his ideas, "were of quite lunatic sterility and academicism, and above all became totally uninteresting". In 1954, he published an essay ("Recherches maintenant") that was both self-critical and forward-looking, in which he lamented the monotony of recent serial works, and in which he began to express a concern with perception, suggesting that his path to the future lay in seeking a balance between rigor and free will. In his next work, Le Marteau sans maître, Boulez employed compositional techniques that were more flexible and supple, incorporating what he would call "local indiscipline", while at the same time reflecting the lessons learned during the creation of the previous works.
