= Pierre Strauch =

French cellist, composer and conductor (born 1958)

- Born: 1958 (age 67–68); France
- Occupations: Cellist, composer, conductor
- Instruments: Cello
- Years active: 1977–present
- Member of: Ensemble intercontemporain

Pierre Strauch (born 1958) is a French cellist, composer and conductor.

Strauch studied cello with Jean Deplace. Strauch won fourth prize at the Rostropovitch Cello Competition in 1977.

In 1978 Strauch joined the ensemble intercontemporain, a French chamber orchestra of 31 soloists founded in 1976 by Pierre Boulez.

In 1994, Strauch, along with composers Diogenes Rivas and Antonio Pileggi, founded the Festival Atempo in Caracas, Venezuela. The festival includes concerts of contemporary music, classical music, jazz and folk music.

Strauch participates actively in educational programs conducted by the ensemble intercontemporain and also teaches at the Academy of Lucerne. Strauch taught sporadically at Paris conservatories.

Strauch is a strong proponent of contemporary music, playing about 80% contemporary music and 20% "classical" music.

Strauch has performed, premiered and recorded many 20th century works by composers such as Iannis Xenakis, Luciano Berio, Bernd Alois Zimmermann and Olivier Messiaen. Strauch gave the Parisian premiere of Time and Motion Study II by Brian Ferneyhough and Ritorno degli Snovidenia by Luciano Berio.

Strauch has composed works for the cello, other solo instruments and chamber ensembles. His works include: La Folie de Jocelin, Preludio imaginario, Faute d’un royaume for solo violin and seven instruments, Deux Portraits for five violas, Trois Odes Funèbres for five instruments, and Quatre miniatures for cello and piano. He has also composed works for voice: Impromptu acrostiche for mezzo and three instruments, and la Beauté (Excès) for three female voices and eight instruments. The ensemble intercontemporain commissioned a work for fifteen instruments, La Escalera del dragón (In memoriam Julio Cortázar), which was premiered in 2004. Strauch says his compositional language is inspired by extra-musical elements such as drawings and literature.

Strauch says performers should not seek to "understand" a piece of music. Rather, music should be seen as a vector of meaning, evoking reactions in the listener.

Strauch's activities as a conductor are sporadic, usually entailing a few projects per year.
