= Théâtre d'Orsay =

Coordinates: 48.8603°N 2.3254°E

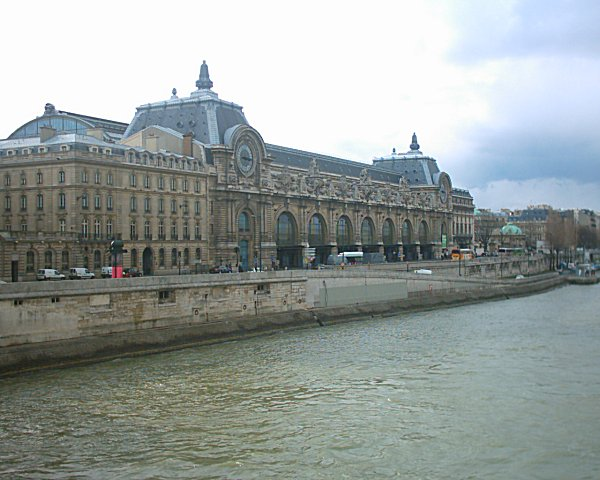
Façade of the former Orsay railway station

The théâtre d'Orsay was a theater located on the rive gauche of the Seine, in the 7th arrondissement of Paris

It was inaugurated in 1972 in the former gare d'Orsay originally conceived by the architect Victor Laloux in 1898. Jean-Louis Barrault installed a removable wooden structure, and presented there very varied shows. The greatest successes will be Sous le vent des îles Baléares by Paul Claudel, Isabella Morra by André Pieyre de Mandiargues, Ainsi parla Zarathoustra, a piece of incidental music by Pierre Boulez after the book by Nietzsche, Les Nuits de Paris by Restif de la Bretonne, and also Zadig after Voltaire or The Singular Life of Albert Nobbs based on a novella by the British novelist George Moore.

However, the station had to be vacated to become the musée d'Orsay. In 1981, the troupe moved to the Palais de Glace which then became the Théâtre du Rond-Point, where Barrault resettled a wooden structure identical to that of the théâtre d'Orsay.
