= Domaines =

Composition by Pierre Boulez

- by Pierre Boulez
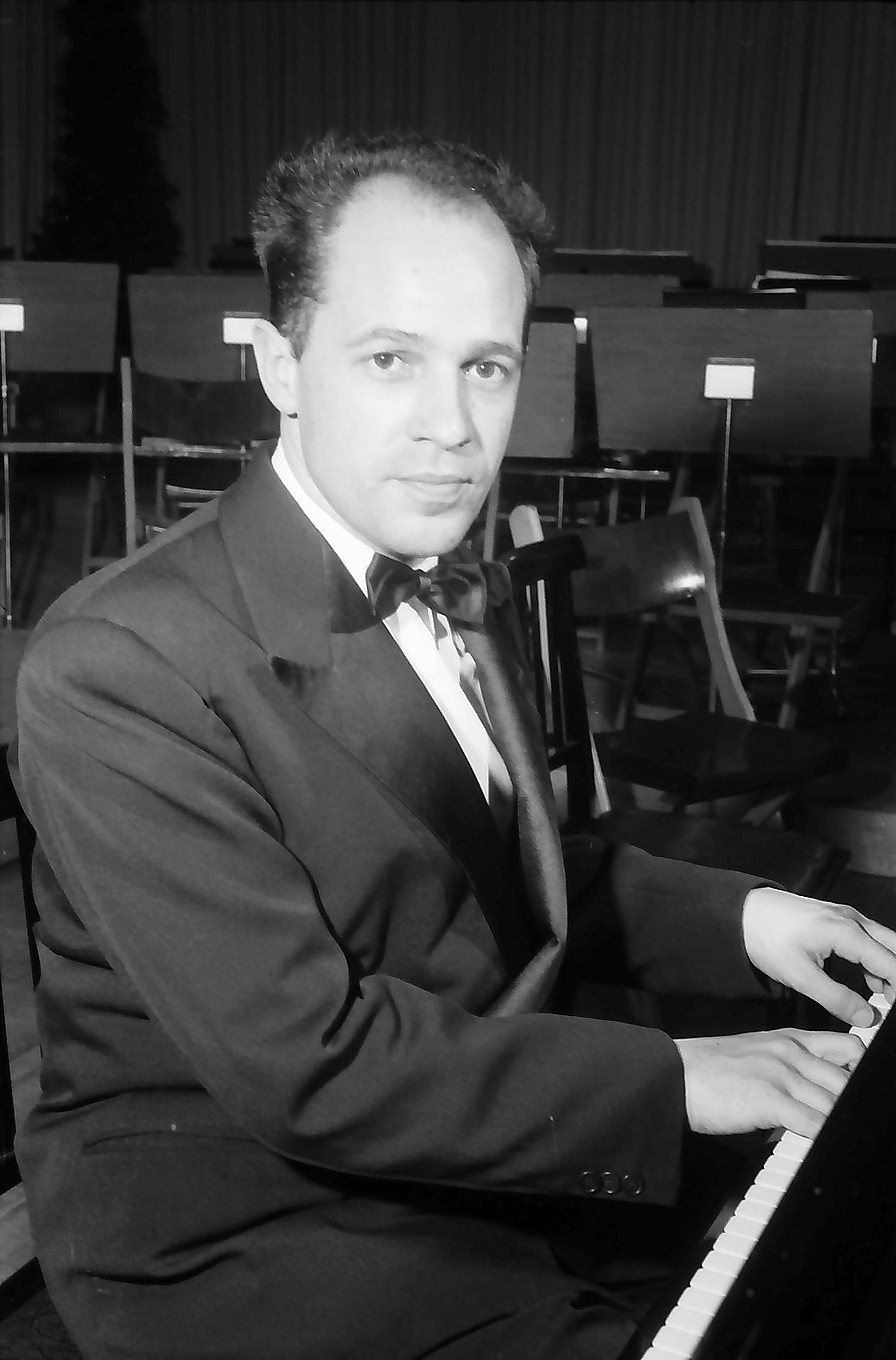
- Boulez in 1956
- Composed: 1961–68
- Performed: September 20, 1968 (solo version); December 20, 1968 (ensemble version)
- Published: 1968
- Movements: 1
- Scoring: Solo clarinet or clarinet and chamber ensemble

Domaines is a composition by Pierre Boulez. Written during 1961–1968, it exists in two versions, one for clarinet solo, the other for clarinet solo and six instrumental groups. Like a number of other Boulez works of this period, it uses mobile form.

== Background ==
Domaines began its life in 1961 as a work for solo clarinet, and was gradually expanded over a period of eight years into a version for clarinet and ensemble, with the soloist, who moves about the stage, determining the order in which material is performed. In an interview, Boulez described his reasons for adopting mobile forms in works of that time period:

Firstly, I felt that the course of a work ought to be multiple rather than simple; secondly, I found that the typographical layout of music could be renewed by the introduction of parentheses, italics, and so on; and thirdly, I wanted the performer confronted by a work to be able to find himself in a completely fresh situation every time he tackled it.

== Material and form ==
The work consists of an "outward" section labeled Original, followed by a "return" section labeled Miroir (Mirror), each lasting about 15 minutes. Each section is composed of six sheets or cahiers (notebooks) marked A–F. In the solo clarinet version, the performer plays the six Original sections in a sequence he or she chooses, after which the six Miroir sections are played. The ensemble version of Domaines requires six instrumental groups labeled with the letters A through F (corresponding to the names of the clarinetist's six sheets), in addition to the soloist and conductor:

1. trombone quartet (one alto, two tenors, one bass)
2. string sextet (two violins, two violas, two cellos)
3. marimba / double bass duo
4. mixed quintet (flute, trumpet, saxophone, bassoon, harp)
5. trio of oboe, horn, guitar
6. solo bass clarinet

The ensemble score is structured in a way which is similar to that of the soloist. In the Original section, the soloist begins, choosing the order of the sheets, and moving to the group with the same letter before playing, after which the group responds with their music while the soloist moves to a different unit. This continues until all six sheets are performed by the soloist, alternating with the instrumental groups. In the Miroir section, the process and the music is reversed: the instrumental groups begin, with the conductor determining the order in which they play, and the soloist follows each group's music with the corresponding sheet, again proceeding through all six sheets.

Thus, although the music is notated, the performer is permitted a certain freedom. According to Boulez, the soloist "manifests his presence in accordance with the six structures he has to play. There is no way in which one can make the structure itself more clear than by rendering it visible through the instrumentalist's movements: but this is no more than a geographical representation of what happens in the score."

However, Boulez also stated that he intended to revise the work, noting that he was "not at all satisfied with its continual alternation between the entries of the instrumentalist and those of the group playing either before or after him," and suggesting that the "symmetrical arrangement of visits to the instrumental groups is too audible." Instead, however, Domaines would prove to be one of Boulez's last mobile works, and became the basis for Dialogue de l'ombre double for clarinet and electronics (1985). Regarding this composition, Boulez remarked: "It is a 'son of Domaines'. Dialogue is the Cahier A of Domaines. But what was originally 30 seconds is now 20 minutes."

Author David Schiff noted that Elliott Carter's Clarinet Concerto, commissioned and premiered by Boulez, divides the orchestra into six groups amongst which the soloist can wander, and thus can be heard as an homage to Domaines.

== Premieres and publication ==
The version for clarinet solo was first performed by Hans Deinzer on September 20, 1968, in Ulm, Germany. The version for clarinet and ensemble was premiered in Brussels on December 20, 1968, with soloist Walter Boeykens and the Radio Belgium symphony orchestra, conducted by Boulez. A revised version of the ensemble edition was first performed in Paris on November 10, 1970, with soloist Michel Portal and the Musique Vivante ensemble, again conducted by Boulez. Both versions are published by Universal Edition.

== Reception ==
Reviewing a 1976 performance, Donal Henahan of The New York Times stated that he "found the solo work fascinating, but the overall score rather mechanically developed and contrived." In a review of a 2005 concert, The Washington Post's Cecelia Porter noted that the score required the soloist "to venture... through endless fluctuations of sonic effects, often reflecting electronic-acoustic musical language," and acknowledged the "wispy echoing motifs alternat[ing] with lightning-quick trills and barely discernible pitch changes."

Pianist Sviatoslav Richter wrote: "Domaines is a work that's both very unsophisticated (for me) and very likeable." However, he cautioned: "I can't make up my mind if this music has any real substance or whether it's totally hollow." Clarinetist Roger Heaton, who recorded the piece in 2013, commented: "The writing for clarinet is fascinating, wonderfully colourful and detailed in notation... This is a piece all clarinettists should know."

Writing for the London Review of Books, Paul Driver remarked: "the composer's desire for mobility of form... and his equal desire for extension in time have misled him into devising a merely over-long and untypically repetitious musical narrative, one which quite lacks ambiguity or inner life, though the surface gestures are beautiful in themselves." Igor Toronyilalic of The Arts Desk described a 2011 performance as "quite suburban," and stated that the soloist "pays two polite visits to each of six charmingly well-behaved chamber groups, who offer an opening brass fanfare, a pastoral eddy and a springing to life in several genteel dances." He concluded: "In all but name, we were in the winning company of a courtly Baroque suite."
