= Éclat/Multiples =

- by Pierre Boulez
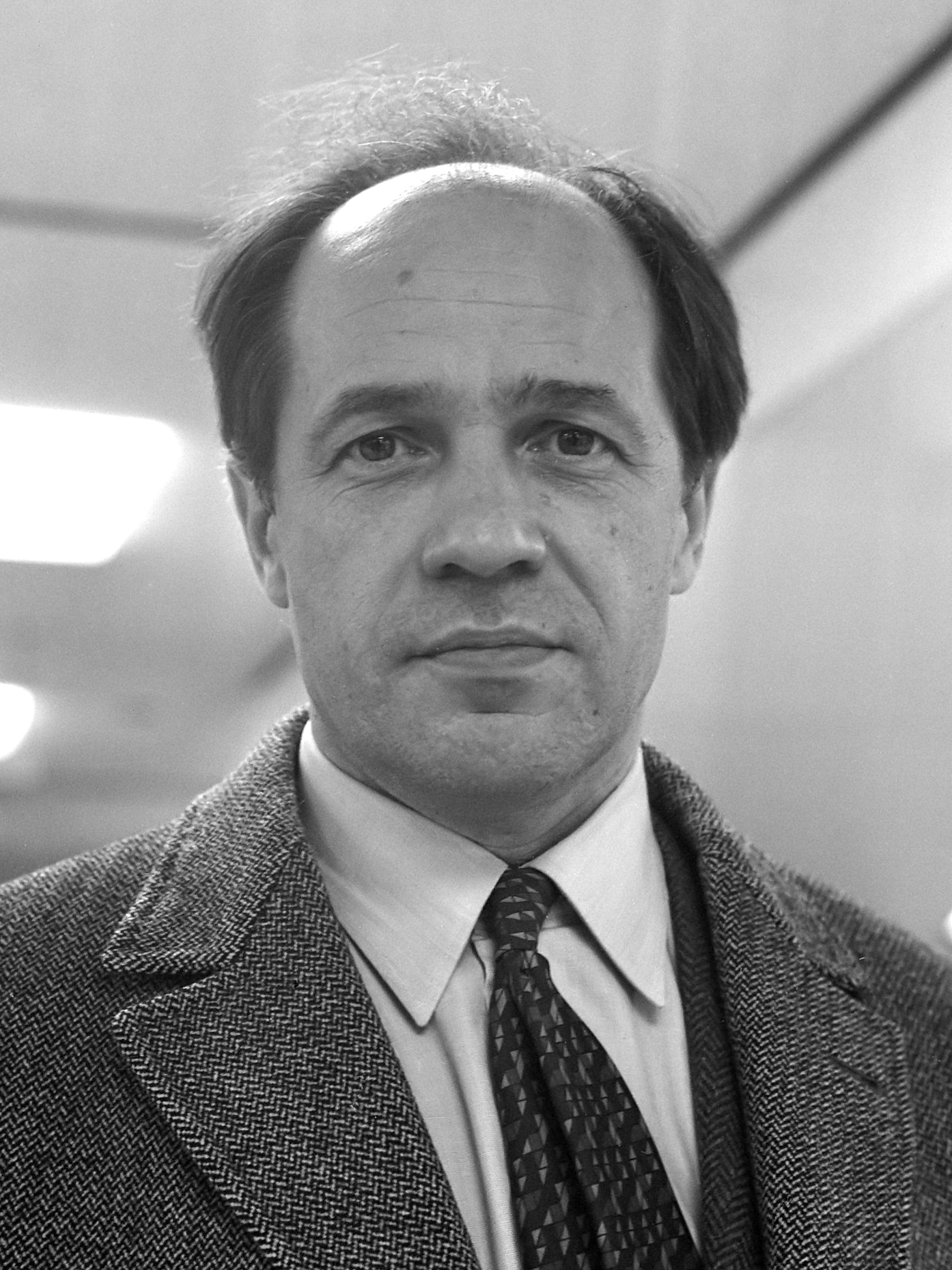
- Boulez in 1968
- Composed: 1966–1970
- Performed: 21 October 1970
- Scoring: orchestra

Éclat/Multiples is a composition for orchestra by Pierre Boulez.

== Background ==
Shortly after the 1965 premiere of Éclat for fifteen instruments, Boulez announced that it was intended to serve as the first part of a large composition for orchestra. Regarding his tendency to revise and expand his works of this period, he commented: "on the creative plane, I live in a kind of plasma which allows me to move around gliding backwards and forwards. I remain within the same thing and I irradiate in several directions at once. I now have supple material which allows me to shift about in time and these re-creations." Accordingly, the extended version of Éclat, called Éclat/Multiples, became a kind of work-in-progress, with ongoing expansions planned over time, although writer Susan Bradshaw suggested that "the almost superhuman size and scope of such a project [made] it doomed to remain open-ended."

== Instrumentation ==
Éclat/Multiples is scored for alto flute, cor anglais, basset horn, trumpet, trombone, glockenspiel, tubular bells, vibraphone, cimbalom, harp, celesta, piano, mandolin, guitar, 10 violas, and cello. (The ensemble is the same as that of Éclat, plus basset horn and nine additional violas.)

== Music ==
Regarding Éclat/Multiples, Boulez remarked: "the multiple reflections of the original musical images interfere with each other and create divergent perspectives, such as Paul Klee imagined in certain of his paintings." Much of drama in Multiples comes from the interaction of the static and dynamic materials first heard in Éclat, with the two now competing for domination. In addition, in Multiples, the ten violas introduce a darker hue, and the basset horn acts as a kind of intermediary between the strings and the soloistic instruments of Éclat.

In a 2010 interview, Boulez indicated that he would "especially like to complete Éclat/Multiples," commenting: "That's one of the works which is almost finished, and, you know, I have practically twice the length of the work as I play it now, and therefore I would like to finish because the concept of the end is already there." Writer Allen Edwards reported that he studied the unfinished and unpublished manuscript housed at the Paul Sacher Foundation, and noted that it consisted of 220 pages, roughly double the number used in the 25-minute version that was publicly performed and recorded. However, the work remained incomplete at the time of the composer's death.

== Premiere and publication ==
Éclat/Multiples was premiered on 21 October 1970, in London, where it was performed by members of the BBC Symphony Orchestra conducted by Boulez. The score was published by Universal Edition.

== Reception ==
Reviewing a recording of the piece, Malcolm Hayes called it "one of the most lucid examples of Boulez's flair for exuberant cellular growth shot through with a sense of instability" and "one of Boulez's very best works." He remarked: "the whole work is a feast of lovely sounds, and Éclat in particular contains some of the most sonically seductive music that Boulez has yet given us."
