= Anthèmes =

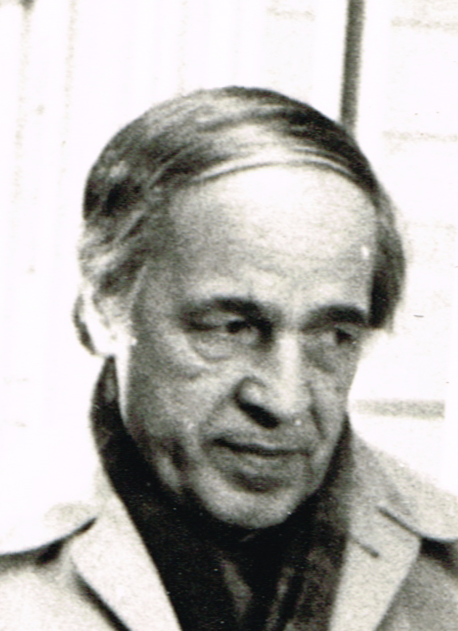
Pierre Boulez in 1985

Anthèmes are two related compositions for violin by French composer Pierre Boulez: Anthèmes I and Anthèmes II.

Anthèmes I is a short piece (c. 9 minutes) for solo violin, commissioned by the 1991 Yehudi Menuhin Violin Competition, and dedicated to Universal Edition's director Alfred Schlee for his 90th birthday. In 1994, Boulez revised and expanded Anthèmes I into a version for violin and live electronics at IRCAM, resulting in Anthèmes II (c. 18 minutes duration), produced in 1997. (Expansion and revision of earlier works is common in Boulez's compositional process; see also Structures.)

The title is a hybrid of the French "thèmes" (themes) and the English "anthem". It is also a play on words with 'anti-thematicism ': "Anthèmes" reunites the "anti" with the "thematic", and demonstrates Boulez's re-acceptance of (loose) thematicism following a long period of staunch opposition to it.

Anthèmes I owes its structure to inspiration Boulez drew from childhood memories of Lent-time Catholic church services, in which the (acrostic) verses of the Jeremiah Lamentations were intoned: Hebrew letters enumerating the verses, and the verses themselves in Latin. Boulez creates two similarly distinct sonic worlds in the work: the Hebrew enumerations become long static or gliding harmonic tones, and the Latin verses become sections that are contrastingly action-packed and articulated (though Boulez says that the piece bears no reference to the content of the verses, and takes as its basis solely the idea of two contrasting sonic language-worlds). The piece begins with a seven-tone motive, and trill on the note D: these are the fundamental motives used in its composition. It is also in seven sections: a short introduction, followed by six "verses", each "verse" preceded by a harmonic-tone "enumeration". The last section is the longest, culminating in a dialogue between four distinct "characters", and the piece closes with the two "languages" gradually melding into one as the intervals finally center around the note D and close into a trill, and then a single harmonic. A final "col legno battuto" ends the piece in Boulez's characteristic witty humour, a gesture of "That's enough for now! See you later!".

== Recordings ==
- Arditti Quartet: From Vienna. With short works by several composers. Includes the first version of Anthèmes, performed by Irvine Arditti. Disques Montaigne, 1995.
- Donaueschinger Musiktage 1997. Includes a live recording of Anthèmes II, performed by Hae-Sun Kang. Col legno, 1999.
- Boulez – Sur Incises & Anthemes II. Violin: Hae-Sun Kang. Deutsche Grammophon, 2000. This recording won the 2001 Gramophone Awards.
- Mikka and Other Assorted Love Songs. Includes Anthèmes I, performed by Eric Rynes. Albany TROY1614. Albany Records, 2016.
- Sequenza: seven works for solo violin, performed by Diego Tosi. Includes Anthèmes. Disques du Solstice, 2005.
- Solo, performed by Julie-Anne Derome. Includes Anthèmes. Atma Classique/IODA, Atma A+CD 2 2117. Outremont, Québec: Atma, 1996.
- Caprices, Anthèmes I plus works by Carter, Nunes and Sciarrino. performed by Irvine Arditti AEON AECD 1755'

== Bibliography ==
- Boulez, Pierre. Anthèmes: pour violon seul (1992). Vienna: Universal Edition, 1992. OCLC: 29620164.
- Goldman, Jonathan. "Analyzing Pierre Boulez's Anthèmes: 'Creating a Labyrinth out of Another Labyrinth'". Unpublished essay. [Montréal]: Université de Montréal, 2001. OCLC: 48831192.
