= Epitaphium (Stravinsky) =

Chamber-music composition

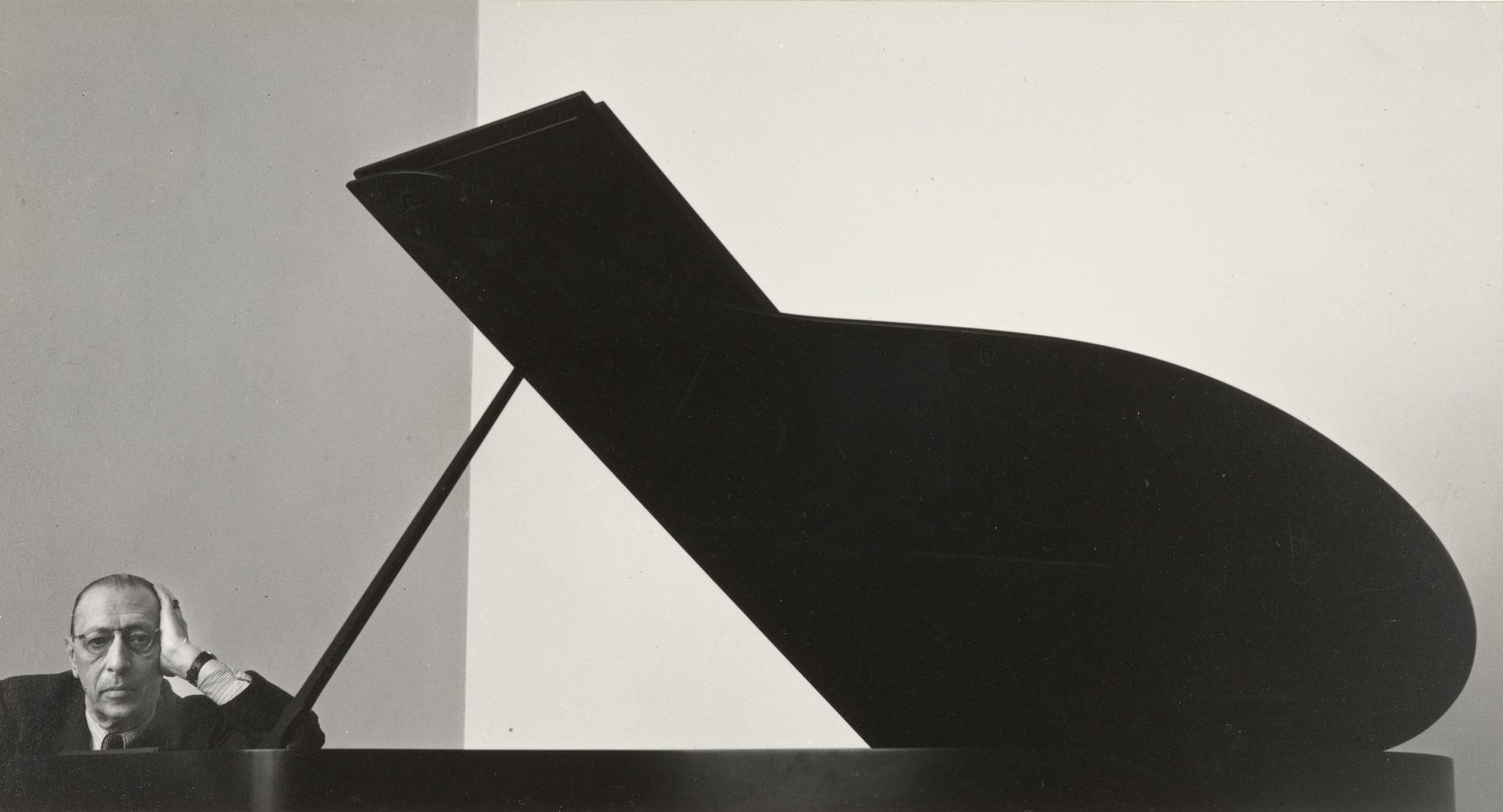
Photograph of Stravinsky by Arnold Newman

"Epitaphium" is a short chamber-music composition by Igor Stravinsky, for flute, clarinet, and harp. The score was composed in 1959 and is inscribed in German, "Für das Grabmal des Prinzen Max Egon zu Fürstenberg" (For the tombstone of Prince Maximilian Egon zu Fürstenberg (1896–1959)). A performance last for less than two minutes.

== History ==
Stravinsky had been the honoured guest of Prince Max Egon zu Fürstenberg, patron of the Donaueschinger Musiktage, during the 1957 and 1958 festivals. When the prince died in April 1959, Stravinsky was asked to write a short composition in his memory. The result was "Epitaphium", which received its premiere on 17 October 1959, on one of that year's three concerts, each of which included a newly composed musical tribute to the prince. The other two pieces were by Pierre Boulez (Tombeau, for soprano and instrumental ensemble, which later became the final movement of Pli selon pli) and Wolfgang Fortner (Parergon zu den Impromptus, for soprano and orchestra).)

In the history of Stravinsky's compositional style, the "Epitaphium" is important as the first work in which he ordered the harmony serially throughout. In earlier works he had used twelve-tone rows for melodic construction, with only the occasional harmonic exception.

== Analysis ==
"Epitaphium" began as a duet for two flutes, and can in fact be played as a flute duet, though the scoring was soon changed to flute and clarinet when Stravinsky learned that his piece was to share a program with Anton Webern's Fünf geistliche Lieder, Op. 15, which include those two instruments. Stravinsky began by composing a melodic-harmonic phrase purely by ear, and only in the midst of writing it saw the potential for a serial pattern, toward which he then turned his attention. The musical problem that first attracted him in the two-part counterpoint had to do with the harmonic use of minor seconds. Once he had completed the first little twelve-tone duet, Stravinsky hit on the idea of composing a series of funeral responses between treble and bass instruments. He chose the harp as bass instrument in order to achieve a muffled effect, and because he found the low notes the most beautiful on the instrument. The completed form is a sort of hymn, which Stravinsky likened to the Music for the Funeral of Queen Mary by Henry Purcell. There are four antiphonal strophes each in the harp and in the treble instruments, with each strophe containing one complete row statement: P, I, R, and RI in the harp, and P, RI, R, and I in the flute-clarinet duo. The resulting alternation of eight musical blocks dominates the form, though its force is counteracted by significant motivic connections among the blocks.

The prime form of "Epitaphium"'s row is C♯, A♯, D♯, E, C, B, F♯, F, D, G, G♯, A. The first hexachord is closely related to the opening of The Firebird, while the intervallic makeup of the entire series shows affinities with the row used by Boulez in Structures for two pianos and the one in Stravinsky's own Double Canon, written in the same year as "Epitaphium". The row occurs only in its untransposed form, which is typical of Stravinsky's smaller twelve-tone pieces.
