= Dialogue de l'ombre double =

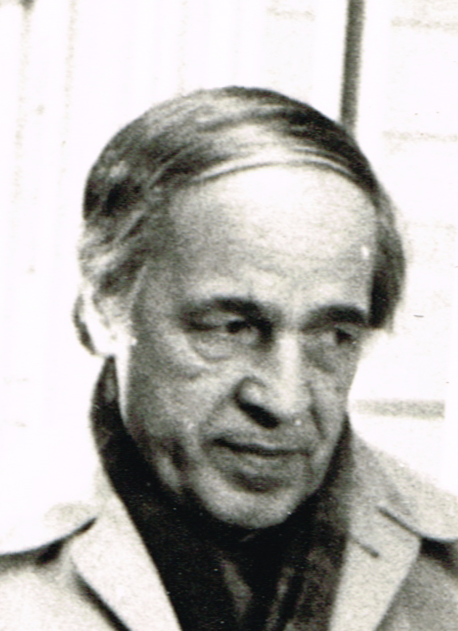
Pierre Boulez in 1985

Dialogue de l'ombre double (Dialogue of the double shadow) is a mixed work by Pierre Boulez for clarinet and electroacoustic device composed in 1985. The work is dedicated to Luciano Berio for his sixtieth birthday. There exist transcriptions for bassoon, for saxophone, for traverse flute and for recorder, each arranged by the performer themself.

Dialogue de l'ombre double is based on the scene "double shadow" of Paul Claudel's 11-hour play The Satin Slipper. The clarinetist performs a dialogue with his or her "shadow", represented by a clarinet part pre-recorded on magnetic tape and spatialized by means of loudspeakers dispersed around the audience.

The work was premiered on October 28, 1985, in Florence by Alain Damiens. The version for saxophone was premiered on June 23, 2001, at the Théâtre des Bouffes du Nord, by Vincent David. The version for traverse flute was premiered in May 2002 in San Francisco by Cécile Daroux. In 2015, a version by Jorrit Tamminga and Erik Bosgraaf for recorder was premiered by Bosgraaf.

A performance lasts about 15 to 20 minutes.
