= Le Soleil des eaux =

- Cantata by Pierre Boulez
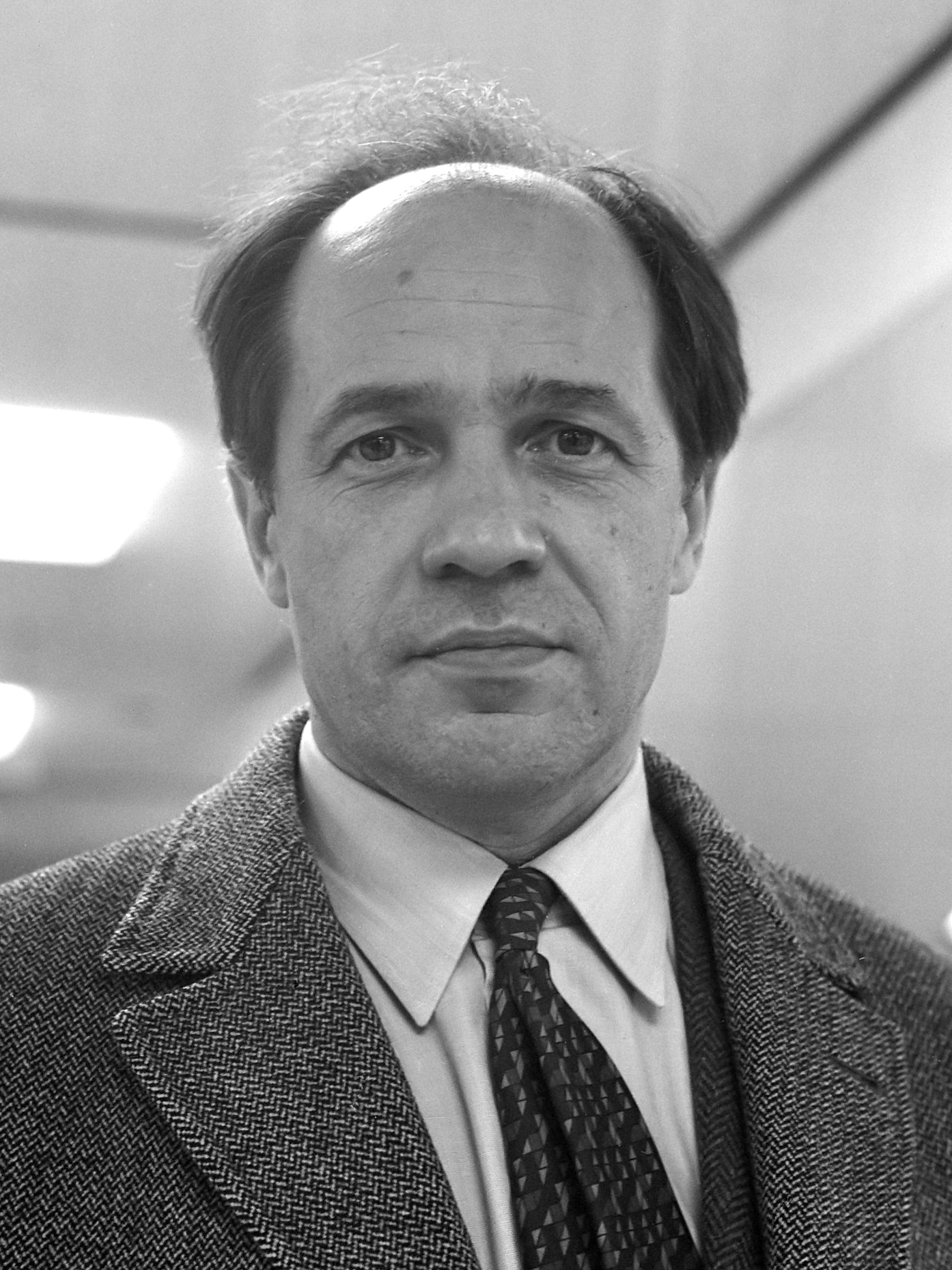
- Boulez in 1968
- English: The Sun of Waters
- Text: two poems by René Char
- Language: French
- Composed: 1947 (first poem), revised 1948 and 1958
- Scoring: soprano; choir; orchestra

Le Soleil des eaux (The Sun of Waters) is a two-movement cantata for soprano, choir and orchestra by Pierre Boulez, based on two poems by René Char, and having a total duration of about nine minutes.

== Background ==
Boulez first encountered Char's poetry in 1945 or 1946, and was immediately attracted to its conciseness and "internal violence". Boulez based his first cantata, Le Visage nuptial (1946–47) on the poet's work, and would later use Char's poems as the basis of Le Marteau sans maître (1953–55). The two met in the summer of 1947, at which point they began a long friendship.

Le Soleil des eaux began life as incidental music for a radio drama of the same name, written by Char, broadcast on RTF on April 29, 1948 and published in April 1949 with illustrations by Georges Braque. The play revolved around a story of fishermen on the river Sorgue whose livelihoods are threatened by pollution from a new factory, and who revolt and attack the factory in response. (Char was born in L'Isle-sur-Sorgue, and the river was a source of inspiration for him throughout his life. Joan Peyser also noted that the story parallels Char's own struggle against Nazism as a member of the French Resistance.) Boulez's contribution to the project, composed at the request of Alain Trutat, a friend of poet Paul Éluard and later the founder of the radio station France Culture, was a 32-minute work which was in part newly-composed, and in part based on a movement for two pianos written in February 1948 and titled "Passacaille-Variations" (later incorporated into an unpublished Sonata for two pianos). The score is a setting for soprano of Char's poem "La complainte du lézard amoureux" ("Lament of the lizard in love"), with orchestral interludes. The poem, written in 1947, was unpublished at that time, but was later included as part of a group of poems titled La Sieste blanche in the collection Les Matinaux (1950). The setting of the poem is unaccompanied; according to Boulez, he conceived of it as a monody and "thought it would be interesting, rather than trying to find an accompaniment, to articulate it by means of interjections, reflections, landscapes, and distorted images." (Boulez also stated that the setting was never performed in its entirety due to its length.) Char was evidently happy with the results, and, in a letter to Boulez, wrote: "I am really pleased with what you are creating and establishing for my poems. The score of Le Soleil des eaux was very beautiful and worthy of our attention. I would like for all your work, drawn up in a fearsome platoon, to properly shoot the idiocy of our time."

In October 1948, Boulez revised the score, adding a second movement based on Char's poem "La Sorgue: chanson pour Yvonne", which appeared as part of La Fontaine narrative, included in the collection Fureur et mystère (1948). (The dedicatee was Yvonne Zervos, a long-time friend of Char who, with her husband Christian Zervos, edited the magazine Cahiers d'art.) This second version, for three vocal soloists and chamber orchestra, was premiered on July 18, 1950 by the RTF orchestra, conducted by Roger Désormière, at the Théâtre des Champs-Élysées in Paris.

In 1958, Boulez revised the score a third time, adding mixed 3-part chorus and rescoring the work for full symphony orchestra. This version was premiered on September 9, 1958 at Darmstadt by the Hessian Radio Chorus and Orchestra conducted by Ernest Bour. Finally, a "definitive" version for soprano soloist, mixed 4-part chorus, and orchestra was prepared. This version was premiered on October 4, 1965 by the Berlin Philharmonic orchestra and chorus, conducted by the composer, with Catherine Gayer as the soloist. The third and fourth versions were published by Heugel in 1968.

== Overview ==
Regarding the two poems on which Le Soleil des eaux is based, Boulez, in an interview, stated: "these two particular texts represent a somewhat free-and-easy version of anguish and violence, and even of the formal discipline of language." He also drew attention to a quotation from Char included in the preface to the score:

We have within us, on our temperate side, a series of songs by which we are flanked, wings by which are linked our restful breathing and mightiest fevers. They are pieces almost commonplace in character, mild in colouring, old-fashioned in outline, yet their texture bears a tiny wound. It is open to everyone to determine where this disputable sore spot begins and where it ends.

The first movement, "La complainte du lézard amoureux", consists mainly of lyrical, delicate, quasi-improvisatory vocal solos interleaved with shimmering, colorful orchestral commentaries. The poem, in seven stanzas, is set in Char's native Provence, and is presented as a love song sung by a lizard to a goldfinch on a summer's day. "La Sorgue", the second movement, provides a dramatic, at times violent contrast with the first, and is dominated by the chorus, which hums, speaks, shouts, and sings in an incantatory way, with several short interventions by the soprano soloist. The poem, in eleven stanzas each of which begins with the word "Rivière", may be seen as an expression in musical terms of the struggle of the fishermen.

Boulez commented:

"La Sorgue" deals with human energy. The river comes out completely full grown, like Minerva—abruptly— out of Zeus's head. The river is not obliged to develop; it is already there from the start. There is a big cave, an enormously ebullient source. The Sorgue is the image of strength. It provides a contrast to the first poem which describes the laziness of the country, a country which doesn't have to be busy, as seen through the lizard's eyes.

== Legacy ==
In a review of the third version of Le Soleil des eaux G. W. Hopkins called the work "enchanting" and "one of Boulez's most accessible scores", praising the composer's setting of the poems and noting the influence of Debussy, Webern, and Messiaen. In a review for AllMusic, John Keillor wrote: "What makes Le Soleil des eaux succeed is partially the brevity of the two movements, but it is also the surfaces. The pure sound at any given time is sublime. Anyone interested in getting acquainted with this work will be rewarded later on with a formal understanding." Paul Griffiths wrote that, along with the Second Piano Sonata, Le Soleil des eaux marked "the end of a period in which Boulez, still only twenty-three, had proved he could master and bring together everything he chose to learn from his predecessors".

Robert Piencikowski wrote that the multiple iterations of the score over roughly twenty years are an example of what he calls "revisionitis", in which "one could speak of successive distinct versions, each one presenting a particular state of the musical material, without the successor invalidating the previous one or vice versa." In a detailed analysis of the transformations of a single musical passage through the various revisions, Gerald Bennett noted a tendency toward "the obscuring of the structure of the music, as though the music would lose its validity if the underlying structures became visible or audible." He concluded: "below a certain general level it is impossible to speak meaningfully of structure in this music. Intricately delicate structure becomes shimmering surface, surface masquerades as structure. The two become indistinguishable, which means the ultimate abrogation and annulment of structure itself."

Joan Peyser called the piece "powerful and exciting", and wrote:

Both the words and music of Le Soleil des Eaux suggest that Boulez would have preferred to emerge from the womb full grown without the years of immaturity during which he felt impotent against a formidable world. His antipathy to helplessness and passivity (the lizard's love for the goldfinch) and his awe and admiration for the strength of the Sorgue (a river that can rust iron) are themes that recur repeatedly in his conversation. Boulez judges composers on their "strength." He uses the same yardstick in regard to his parents: "They were strong, but we were stronger than they."
