= Le Marteau sans maître =

Composition by Pierre Boulez

- Composition for voice and ensemble by Pierre Boulez
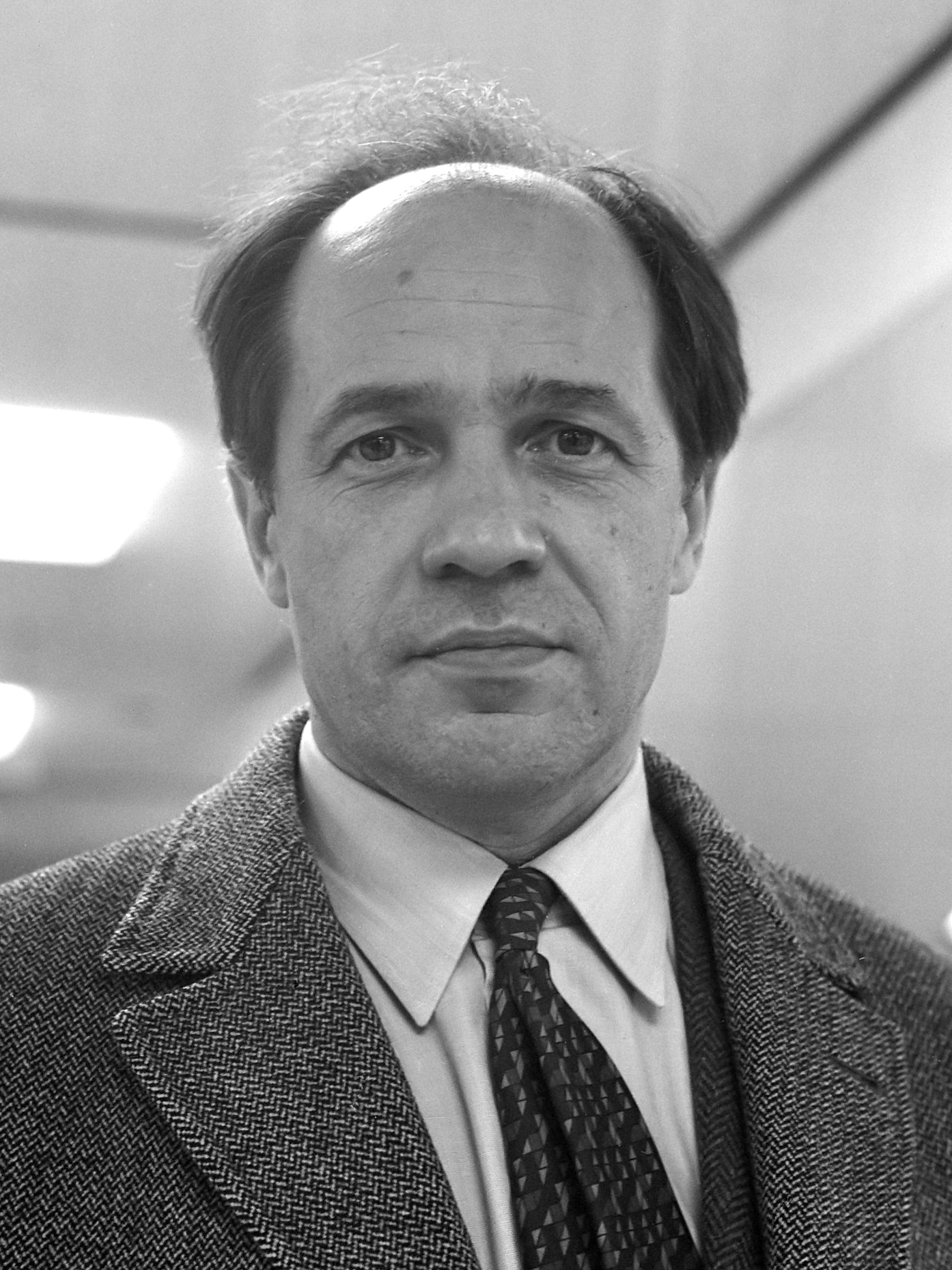
- The composer in 1968
- English: The Hammer without a Master
- Text: Three poems by René Char
- Language: French
- Performed: 18 June 1955: 29th Festival of the International Society for Contemporary Music in Baden-Baden
- Movements: 9
- Scoring: contralto and ensemble

Le Marteau sans maître (French: [lə maʁto sɑ̃ mɛːtʁ]; The Hammer without a Master) is a chamber cantata by French composer Pierre Boulez. The work, which received its premiere in 1955, sets surrealist poetry by René Char for contralto and six instrumentalists. It is among his most acclaimed compositions.

== History ==
Before Le Marteau, Boulez had established a reputation as the composer of modernist and serialist works such as Structures I, Polyphonie X, as well as his infamously "unplayable" Second Piano Sonata. Le Marteau was first written as a six-movement composition between 1953 and 1954, and was published in that form in the latter year, "imprimée pour le festival de musique, 1954, Donaueschingen" (though in the end it was not performed there) in a photographic reproduction of the composer's manuscript by Universal Edition, given the catalog number UE 12362.

In 1955 Boulez revised the order of these movements and interpolated three newly composed ones. The original, six-movement form lacked the two "Bel Édifice" settings and the third commentaire on "Bourreaux de solitude". In addition, the movements were grouped in two closed cycles: first the three "Artisanat furieux" movements, then the three "Bourreaux de solitude" ones, otherwise in the order of the final score. The first movement, though fundamentally the same composition, was originally scored as a duet for vibraphone and guitar—the flute and viola were added only in the revision—and numerous less significant alterations were made to playing techniques and notation in the other movements.

It received its première in 1955 at the 29th Festival of the International Society for Contemporary Music in Baden-Baden. Boulez's work was chosen to represent France at this festival. The French members of the committee were against this, but Heinrich Strobel, then director of the Baden-Baden Südwestfunk Orchestra, which was scheduled to give all of the concerts at the festival, threatened to withdraw the orchestra if the work was not accepted. The first performance was given on 18 June 1955 conducted by Hans Rosbaud, with Sybilla Plate as the solo singer.

Boulez, notorious for considering his works to be always "in progress", made further, smaller revisions to Le Marteau in 1957, in which year Universal Edition issued an engraved score, UE 12450. In the years that have followed, it has become Pierre Boulez's most famous and influential work.

== Movements ==
The work has nine movements, four of which set the text of three poems of René Char. The remaining movements are instrumental extrapolations of the other four:

1. Avant "L'Artisanat furieux" (Before "The Furious Craftsmanship")
2. Commentaire I de "Bourreaux de solitude" (First commentary on "Hangmen of Solitude")
3. "L'Artisanat furieux" (The Furious Craftsmanship)
4. Commentaire II de "Bourreaux de solitude" (Second commentary on "Hangmen of Solitude")
5. "Bel Édifice et les pressentiments", version première ("Stately Building and Presentiments", first version)
6. "Bourreaux de solitude" ("Hangmen of Solitude")
7. Après "L'Artisanat furieux" (After "The Furious Craftsmanship")
8. Commentaire III de "Bourreaux de solitude" (Third commentary on "Hangmen of Solitude")
9. "Bel Édifice et les pressentiments", double ("Stately Building and Presentiments", again)

These movements are grouped into three cycles by Boulez. The first cycle consists of movements I, III, and VII. The second cycle is movements II, IV, VI, and VIII. Movements V and IX make up the third cycle.

== Composition ==
Steven Winick writes:

It is well known that Boulez is reluctant to explain his own compositions. When asked to supply program notes for the first performance of Le Marteau in 1955 at the Baden-Baden International Society for Contemporary Music, Boulez laconically wrote, as quoted by Friederich Saathen: "Le Marteau sans Maître, after a text by René Char, written for alto, flute, viola, guitar, vibraphone, and percussion. The text is partially sung, partially interpreted through purely instrumental passages."

Despite having been published in 1954 and 1957, analysts were unable to explain Boulez's compositional methods until Lev Koblyakov in 1977. This is partially due to the fact that Boulez believes in strict control tempered with "local indiscipline", or rather, the freedom to choose small, individual elements while still adhering to an overall structure compatible with serialist principles. Boulez opts to change individual notes based on sound or harmony, choosing to abandon adherence to the structure dictated by strict serialism, making the detailed serial organization of the piece difficult for the listener to discern.

=== Orchestration ===
The instrumentation was quite novel for Western music at the time, lacking any kind of bass instrument, and drew some influence from the sound of non-Western instruments. The xylorimba recalls the African balafon; the vibraphone, the Balinese gamelan; and the guitar, the Japanese koto, though "neither the style nor the actual use of these instruments has any connection with these different musical civilizations". Boulez chose the collection with a continuum of sonorities in mind: "a number of features shared by these instruments (forms) a continuous passage from voice to vibraphone". The purpose is to allow a graduated deconstruction of the voice into percussive noises, a compositional technique which has been common throughout Boulez's work (e.g. Sur Incises of 1998 similarly breaks down the sounds of the piano by combining it with harp and percussion). The voice and five pitched instruments can be arranged in a line, each pair connected by a similarity, as in the following diagram:

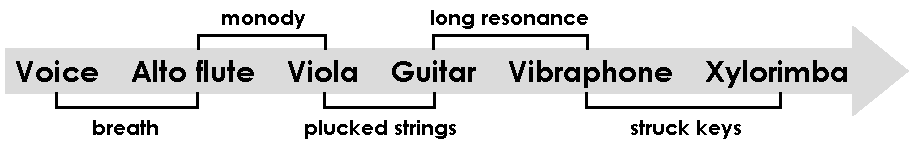

The vocal writing is challenging for the singer, containing wide leaps, glissandi, humming (notated bouche fermée in the score), and even Sprechstimme, a device found in the work of the Second Viennese School before Boulez. There are also deliberate similarities to Arnold Schoenberg's song cycle, Pierrot Lunaire, one of which is that each movement chooses a different subset of the available instruments:

1. Alto flute, vibraphone, guitar, viola
2. Alto flute, xylorimba, tambourine, 2 bongos, frame drum, viola
3. Voice, alto flute
4. Xylorimba, vibraphone, finger cymbals, agogô, triangle, guitar, viola
5. Voice, alto flute, guitar, viola
6. Voice, alto flute, xylorimba, vibraphone, maracas, guitar, viola
7. Alto flute, vibraphone, guitar
8. Alto flute, xylorimba, vibraphone, claves, agogô, 2 bongos, maracas
9. Voice, alto flute, xylorimba, vibraphone, maracas, small tam-tam, low gong, very deep tam-tam, large suspended cymbal, guitar, viola

The opening of the third movement in the flute is typical of the difficulties required of performers including wide range, large leaps, and complex rhythms:

Opening of the third movement of Boulez's Le Marteau with flute features wide leaps and complex rhythms.

=== First cycle: "L'Artisanat furieux" ===
Boulez uses many serial composition techniques, including pitch multiplication and pitch-class association. According to Koblyakov, Movements I, III, and VII, are based on multiplying together various sets derived from the following tone row: 3 5 2 1 10 11 9 0 8 4 7 6. However, Mosch argues that this is not the basic form, but rather the "série renversée" (inversion) of the basic row.

Boulez groups these notes into five sets according to five different rotations on the pattern 2–4–2–1–3, reflecting the highly mathematical nature in which this piece is composed. Following the first rotation of this pattern, the row would be grouped as 3 5 – 2 1 10 11 – 9 0 – 8 – 4 7 6. Using the five possible rotations of this pattern, Boulez creates five rows of five groupings each:

| | a | b | c | d | e |
|---|---|---|---|---|---|
| I | 3 5 | 2 1 10 11 | 9 0 | 8 | 4 7 6 |
| II | 3 5 2 1 | 10 11 | 9 | 0 8 4 | 7 6 |
| III | 3 5 | 2 | 1 10 11 | 9 0 | 8 4 7 6 |
| IV | 3 | 5 2 1 | 10 11 | 9 0 8 4 | 7 6 |
| V | 3 5 2 | 1 10 | 11 9 0 8 | 4 7 | 6 |

Using these 25 groups in conjunction with pitch multiplication, Boulez is able to create 25 "harmonic fields" within each set. Koblyakov in his analysis assigns a letter to each cluster within a set, such that two sets multiplied together can be notated as "aa", "bc", "ed", etc. Boulez's form of pitch multiplication can be thought of more as pitch addition. With this technique, Boulez takes two clusters and takes the sum of every possible pairing between the two clusters. For example, if we were to multiply groups b and c within set I, we would have the following:

(2 1 10 11) + (9 0) = ((2+9) (1+9) (10+9) (11+9) (2+0) (1+0) (10+0) (11+0)) = (11 10 7 8 2 1 10 11)

Boulez then eliminates any duplicate pitches, which in this case would leave us with the set 11 10 7 8 2 1. In fact, this is the set of notes we get in measure three of movement III, "L'Artisanat furieux." This movement, scored only for flute and voice, lays out pitch multiplication in a more straightforward way than movements I and VII. For the first 11 measures, Boulez (mostly) sticks to one pitch multiplication set per measure. Later, Boulez begins to use multiple pitch fields at a time, further complicating the analysis. Koblyakov's analysis reveals that the harmonic fields Boulez employs at certain parts of the piece are laid out very systematically, showing that the movements' overall forms are complexly mathematical as well.

=== Second cycle: "Bourreaux de solitude" ===
The second cycle consists of movements II, IV, VI, and VIII. Through these movements, especially movement VI, Boulez uses a technique called "pitch-duration association" by Steven Winick. This technique associates individual pitches with individual durations, for example, C = sixteenth note, C♯ = eighth note, D = dotted-eighth note, so that as the pitch increases by half step the associated duration increases by an added sixteenth note. Winick calls this a pitch-duration association or PDA based on C. In movement VI, these PDAs are most easily observed, with the first twelve notes of the piece forming a PDA on D. The next twelve notes also fall neatly into a PDA on G♯, though Boulez occasionally swaps the durations of a couple pitches throughout this system, reflecting his interest in "local indiscipline." Another way in which Boulez confuses the analysis of this cycle is by placing some rhythms under triplet markings. After the voice enters in measure 13 of the movement, matters become even more complicated as Boulez employs all 12 possible PDAs simultaneously throughout the rest of the movement. As with the first cycle, Boulez's overall formal structure is quite complex and shows many patterns. Arrangements in pitch order throughout these PDAs reveals many symmetrical and palindromic arrangements, which are further explored both in Winick's and Koblyakov's analyses.

In addition to coordinating durations with certain pitches, Boulez assigns dynamics and attacks to pitches in a similar manner. Using the opening PDA on D as an example, Boulez arranges the pitches chromatically and then groups them into 6 pairs (D and D♯, E and F, F♯ and G, etc.), assigning a dynamic from pianissimo to fortissimo to each pair. In addition, the first note within a pair receives an attack of some sort—legato for piano and pianissimo, accent for mezzo forte and mezzo piano, and sforzando for forte and fortissimo. However, while these dynamic and attack associations are consistent enough to be unmistakably deliberate, Boulez returns again to the idea of "local indiscipline". Wentzel found that Boulez's association of pitches, dynamics, durations, and attacks agrees with his analysis 80% of the time. A number of these discrepancies are accounted for by differences among the printed and manuscript sources, but it is impossible to say whether any are deliberate compositional decisions.

=== Third cycle: "Bel Édifice et les pressentiments" ===
The third cycle consists only of movements V and IX, making it the shortest of the three cycles. However, both of these movements play essential roles in the piece, especially when one takes into account the extreme levels of symmetry and pattern employed by Boulez in his composition of the work. Movement V occupies the central position in Le marteau, and the movement itself may be broken up into six sections. Boulez designates these sections in his tempo markings and orchestrations—the three odd-numbered sections are written only for instruments and marked assez vif, while the three even-numbered sections are scored for voice and instruments and marked plus large. An interesting characteristic of Boulez's orchestrating during the even sections is that the voice and instruments seem to be in opposition, with the instruments playing similar rhythms and dynamics (or at least more similar than between the instruments and the voice). In the sections where the voice is not present, the writing for the instruments is more contrapuntal. Movement V also uses Sprechgesang while vocal parts in the other cycles do not.

Movement IX is broken up into three large sections, with the third being broken up further into a number of smaller fragments. The first large section includes variations of quotations from the central movements of all three cycles (movements III, V, and VI) along with the text from movement 5. The movements are quoted in reverse order (i.e. VI, V, III), and each time the text from the quoted movement is combined in some way with the text from movement III. The second large section, also the main section of the movement, includes a voice part without text and is built on a similar set of PDAs as the second cycle of Marteau while also drawing on movement V. The harmony for this section is interesting in that Boulez entirely avoids minor seconds as well as minor thirds (though their inverse, major sixths, are used instead). Unisons are used very rarely. The third section of movement IX serves as both a coda to the movement and to the piece. It is scored only for flute and percussion.

Another interesting characteristic of movement IX is that all of its tempos are drawn from previous movements. Tempo shifts also almost always increase by a ratio of 1.2 or 1.5.

== Text ==
The text for this work was taken from René Char's collection of poems, Le Marteau sans maître, written in the 1930s while Char "still shared the surrealist views of poets like André Breton and Henri Michaux". Boulez had earlier written two cantatas, Le Visage nuptial and Le Soleil des eaux in 1946 and 1948, which also set poems by René Char.

L'Artisanat furieux
The Furious Craftsmanship

La roulotte rouge au bord du clou
Et cadavre dans le panier
Et chevaux de labours dans le fer à cheval
Je rêve la tête sur la pointe de mon couteau le Pérou.

The red caravan on the edge of the nail
And corpse in the basket
And plowhorses in the horseshoe
I dream the head on the point of my knife Peru.

Bourreaux de solitude
Hangmen of solitude

Le pas s'est éloigné le marcheur s'est tu
Sur le cadran de l'Imitation
Le Balancier lance sa charge de granit réflexe.

The step has gone away, the walker has fallen silent
On the dial of Imitation
The Pendulum throws its instinctive load of granite.

Bel Édifice et les pressentiments
Stately building and presentiments

J'écoute marcher dans mes jambes
La mer morte vagues par dessus tête
Enfant la jetée promenade sauvage
Homme l'illusion imitée
Des yeux purs dans les bois
Cherchent en pleurant la tête habitable.

I hear marching in my legs
The dead sea waves overhead
Child the wild seaside pier
Man the imitated illusion
Pure eyes in the woods
Are searching in tears for a habitable head.

== Reception and legacy ==
Le Marteau sans maître was hailed by critics, fellow composers, and other musical experts as a masterpiece of the post-war avant-garde from its first performance in 1955. Interviewed in 2014, the composer Harrison Birtwistle declared that Le Marteau sans maître "is the kind of piece, in all the noise of contemporary music that's gone on in my lifetime, I'd like to have written". Another British composer, George Benjamin, described the work as "a breakthrough. It is a work in which you can also hear the profound influence of extra-European music, above all from Asia and Africa. This radically alters the sonority and the music's sense of time and direction, as well as its expressive viewpoint and ethos". One of the most enthusiastic and influential early testimonials came from Igor Stravinsky, who praised the work as an exemplar of "a new and wonderfully supple kind of music".

However, according to Howard Goodall, the sixty years since its première have failed to grant Le marteau an equally enthusiastic endorsement from the general public. "While Boulez's iconoclasm was attractive to some students of twentieth-century classical music, who venerated… Le marteau sans maître,… most neutral listeners then as now found both his polemic and his music thoroughly impenetrable". Despite its attractive surface, its "smooth sheen of pretty sounds", issues remain about the music's deeper comprehensibility for the ordinary listener. Even Stravinsky's ear struggled to hear some of the work's polyphonic textures: "One follows the line of only a single instrument and is content to be 'aware of' the others. Perhaps later the second line and the third will be familiar, but one mustn't try to hear them in the tonal-harmonic sense". But if we are supposed not to listen in the tonal-harmonic sense, what exactly is it that we should hear and understand in a work which, in the words of Alex Ross, features "nothing so vulgar as a melody or a steady beat"? Stravinsky said that repeated hearings, through the availability of recordings, would aid performers more quickly to overcome technical difficulties presented by the music: "If a work like Le marteau sans maître had been written before the present era of recording it would have reached young musicians outside of the principal cities only years later. As it is this same Marteau, considered so difficult to perform a few years ago, is now within the technique of many players, thanks to their being taught by record".

Writing some 40 years since Le Marteau first appeared, composer and music psychologist Fred Lerdahl criticized Koblyakov's approach to analyzing Le Marteau:

For one thing, competent listeners to Le Marteau, even after many hearings, still cannot even begin to hear its serial organization, ... [though] [e]xperienced listeners do not find Le Marteau totally incomprehensible. ... Of course a musician of Boulez's calibre would not use a compositional system without drawing crucially upon his musical intuition and experience. Music-generating algorithms alone have always produced primitive outputs; not enough is known about musical composition and cognition for them to succeed. Boulez had the intellectually less ambitious goal of developing a system that could just produce a quantity of musical material having a certain consistency. He then shaped his material more or less intuitively, using both his "ear" and various unacknowledged constraints. In so doing, he listened much as another listener might. The organization deciphered by Koblyakov was just a means, and not the only one, towards an artistic end.

Lerdahl cautions, however, that "There is no obvious relationship between the comprehensibility of a piece and its value". While considering "complicatedness to be a neutral value and complexity to be a positive one", and therefore that only musical surfaces leading to complexity employ "the full potential of our cognitive resources", many kinds of music satisfy such criteria (e.g., Indian raga, Japanese koto, jazz, and most Western art music), while other types "fall short": Balinese gamelan because of its "primitive pitch space" and rock music on grounds of "insufficient complexity", while much contemporary music (without specific reference to Boulez) "pursues complicatedness as compensation for a lack of complexity".

Roger Scruton finds Boulez's preoccupation with timbre and sonority in the instrumental writing has the effect of preventing "simultaneities from coalescing as chords". As a result, Scruton says that, especially where pitches are concerned, Le Marteau "contains no recognizable material – no units of significance that can live outside the work that produces them". Scruton also feels that the involved overlapping metres notated in the score beg "a real question as to whether we hear the result as a rhythm at all". Richard Taruskin found "Le Marteau exemplified the lack of concern on the part of modernist composers for the comprehensibility of their music". Equally bluntly, Christopher Small, writing in 1987 said "It is not possible to invoke any 'inevitable time lag' which is supposed to be required for the assimilation of ...such critically acclaimed works as... Le marteau sans maître... Those who champion 'the new music' await its assimilation into the repertory much as the early Christians awaited the Second Coming".
