= Gabriel Fragnière =

Gabriel Fragnière (4 March 1934 – 9 September 2015) was a Swiss university professor, philosopher and scientific researcher.

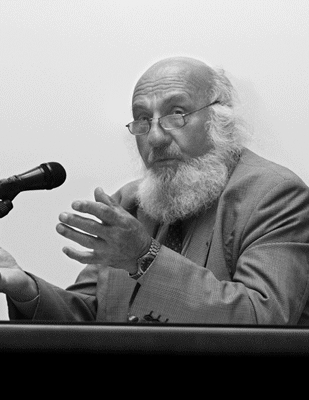
Gabriel Fragnière

== Biography ==
Fragnière was born in Lausanne. He graduated in Philosophy at the University of Lausanne. He continued with a postgraduate at the College of Europe in Bruges (1959–1960) and became assistant to the rector and director of studies at the College (1961–1966). He then went to the United States and studied during two years the history of religions (1966–1968). In 1993 he obtained his doctorate in philosophy at the University of Maastricht.

Fragnière's career has been entirely devoted to European matters, including domains of education, professional training, university cooperation and social policies. He has been

- editor of the European Journal of Education (previously Paedagogica Europea), 1973–1980.
- founder and first general secretary of the Société Européenne pour la Formation des Ingénieurs, 1973–1980, and of the Association for Teacher Education in Europe, 1976–1980.
- director of the Centre Européen Travail et Société , Maastricht, 1980–1991
- director of the EUROTECNET programme of the European Community.
- founder of Presses Interuniversitaires Européennes (P.I.E), 1985 (taken over by Peter Lang in 1999).
- part-time director of the program Central European University, Prague, 1991–1993
- rector of the College of Europe in Bruges, 1993–1995
- professor of sociology of religions, at the centre for social studies, Central European University, Warsaw, 2001–2003
- first chairman of Forum Europe des Cultures, for the defence and promotion of European cultural diversity, 2002–2005. (interim chairman in 2009)
- president of Mémoire d’Europe, association for the assistance of European citizens in order to know better their identity and common history.
- director of three collections at PIE – Peter Lang in Brussels: Philosophie et Politique; Dieux, Hommes et Religions; Europe des cultures.

He died in Brussels (Woluwe Saint-Lambert) in 2015.

== Publications ==
- Le royaume de l’homme, Essai sur la religion et la démocratie, Genève, 1973.
- Ramon Llull… ou les premiers jalons d’une Europe tolérante, Portraits d’Européens, PIE, 1974.
- A University of the Future, Springer Verlag, 1974.
- L’éducation créatrice, Bruxelles, Paris, 1975, (translated into German, English, Spanish, Portuguese.)
- L’homme et la vie, Biologie contemporaine et éthique, Paris, 1978.
- (with Kaj Doorten), Employment and youth policy, European Centre for Work & Society, 1983.
- Égalité des chances et formation professionnelle : Résultat de l'analyse comparative de sept rapports nationaux portant sur les programmes de formation professionnelle des femmes en entreprise, juillet 1982, Office des publications officielles des Communautés européennes, 1984.
- The Future of Work: Challenge and Opportunity, Van Gorcum Ltd, 1984.
- Formation et condition humaine au XXIe siècle, PIE, 1991 (translated in Catalan).
- (with George Spyropoulos), Work and Social Policies in the New Europe, PIE, 1991.
- L’obligation morale et l’éthique de la prospérité, thèse de doctorat, Collection « Philosophie et Politique » N° 2, PIE, 1993.
- Stefan Zweig… ou espérer l’Europe et en mourir, Portraits d’Européens, PIE, 1993.
- Towards a competent Europe,European Interuniversity Press, 1993.
- L'Europe des compétences, European Interuniversity Press, 1993.
- L'Obligation Morale et l' Éthique De La prospérité - Le Retour Du Sujet Responsable, Presses Universitaires Européennes, 1993.
- Walter Hallstein… ou une pédagogie politique pour la fédération européenne, Portraits d’européens, PIE, 1995.
- La certitude et l’action. L’intuition est-elle une connaissance transmissible?, PIE, 1998.
- (with Peter Chidi Okuma), Towards an African Theology: The Igbo Context in Nigeria, P.I.E.-Peter Lang, 2002.
- Le Chemin et le Regard, La Renaissance du Livre, 2004.
- (with Karel Dobbelaere), Secularization: An Analysis at Three Levels, European Interuniversity Press, 2005.
- La religion et le pouvoir. La chrétienté, l’Occident et la démocratie, PIE - Peter Lang, Collection : « Dieux, Hommes et religions », N° 6, 2005 & 2006, (translated in Italian, La religione e il potere, La cristianità, l’Occidente e la democrazia, Edizioni Dehoniane Bologna », 2008).
- Hendrik Brugmans. Building Europe by educating Europeans, Madariaga Foundation, Brussels, 2006.
- (with Mark Dubrulle), Identités Culturelles Et Citoyenneté Européenne: Diversité Et Unité Dans La Construction Democratique De L’Europe, Peter Lang, 2008.
- (with Ignace Berten e.a.), Regards éthiques sur l'Union Européenne, P.I.E.-Peter Lang, 2011.
- Autre regard sur l'homme et le divin: Essai sur les religions et la philosophie, EME éditions, 2015.

To be published:

- Miroir littéraire d’un Européen, Journal personnel, Tome I: La houle du temps.
- Du multiculturalisme à la convivance. Vers une nouvelle culture politique européenne (Coll. Europe des Cultures).

Preceded by Werner Ungerer	Rectors of the College of Europe; 1993-1995	Succeeded by Otto von der Gablentz
