= Manfred Stahnke =

Manfred Stahnke (born 30 October 1951) is a German composer and musicologist from Hamburg. He writes chamber music, orchestral music and stage music. His music makes extensive use of microtonality. He plays piano and viola.

== Life ==
Manfred Stahnke was born in 1951 in Kiel. At the age of 15 he started to study violin, piano, and composition in Lübeck.

Stahnke studied composition with Wolfgang Fortner (1970–1973), with Klaus Huber and Brian Ferneyhough (1973–1974), and with György Ligeti (1974–1979). In addition, he studied piano; his primary piano teacher was Edith Picht-Axenfeld.

He also holds a doctoral degree in musicology, with a thesis on the subject of Pierre Boulez's Third Piano Sonata (1979, under Constantin Floros in Hamburg).

In 1979–80 he went to the United States to study with the microtonalist Ben Johnston in Urbana, Illinois, and with the computer music researcher and composer John Chowning at Stanford University, California.

Since 1989 he is professor of composition and music theory at the Hochschule für Musik und Theater Hamburg. He is an emeritus since April 2019. Since 1999 he is a member of the Freie Akademie der Künste Hamburg, where he was the director of the Section of Music until 2023. He also was a member of the board of trustees of the Goethe Institute Munich for many years.

He plays the viola in the TonArt Ensemble.

== Works ==
- 1978 Metallic Spaces, Orch. in 72ET, Gaudeamus, Radio Symphony Hilversum 1978
- 1979 Ritus, fl vc pno, Wolpe-Trio Essen, prem. around 1994
- 1980–81 Der Untergang des Hauses Usher, Chamber Opera, Kiel 1981
- 1982 Wahnsinn, das ist die Seele der Handlung (poems of E.A.Poe), Music Theater: female voice & string quartet, Braunschweig & Gelsenkirchen 1983, Carla Henius, new version Berliner Staatsoper 2012
- 1983–86 Heinrich IV. (Luigi Pirandello), Chamber Opera, Kiel 1987
- 1982–85 Partota, pno in Vallotti-tuning, Hubertus Dreyer, Hamburg 1986
- 1986 Two Scales, 2 bassoons, American Festival of Microtonal Music Ensemble: April Chapman, Johnny Reinhardt, New York
- 1987 En cet hybride tamps, chamber ens., 4 cl, 2 v, 2 va, harp, Yamaha DX7-II synthesizer, 2 perc, ensemble modern, Saarbrücken 1988, prem. new version Szombathely 1990
- 1987 Capra 1, v solo in scordatura, prem. Michael Kollars Hamburg, CD Barbara Lueneburg, coviello, The Redefined Ear
- 1988 Bratschensonate, Christian Stahnke, Mike Rutledge, Hubertus Dreyer, Hamburg 1990–92, new version 2005
- 1989 Tanz, Almeida, tanze!, chamber ens., fl clar trb v vc syn, Stuttgart, ensemble avance
- 1990 Centonage, chamber ens., fl ob clar trp trb perc harp synth 3 v va vc, ensemble modern, Frankfurt
- 1990 Kreislieder, chamber ens., altofl clar (MIDI)guit harp, Amsterdam, nieuw ensemble
- 1991/98 Ansichten eines Käfers, solo guitar in scordatura, Satoshi Oba, Odense 1995
- 1992 Partota II - für György Ligeti, MIDI-piano & sampler, Hubertus Dreyer, Hamburg
- 1993 Saitenspiel, 7 v, 3 va, 3 vc, cb, Hamburger Camerata, dir. Claus Bantzer, Hamburg
- 1994 Partota 3, accordion solo, Lydia Schmidl
- 1994 Streetmusic I, trb & steeldrums, Metal Brass, Mainz 1995. Version for bass & steeldrums, l'art pour l'art, Hamburg 1997
- 1994 Harbor Town Love at Millennium's End, sax perc pno, Donaueschingen, trio accanto
- 1997 Trace des sorciers, Orch., SWR Sinfonieorchester, Dir. Olav Henzold, Donaueschingen
- 1998/99 Lumpengalerie, fl clar v vc pno perc, Ensemble Est!Est!!Est!!! Bonn
- 2000 Viertes Streichquartett, München
- 2001 Orpheus Kristall, Opera for stage & internet, Soprano, 2 Mezzo sopranos, Baritone. Solo perc, Internet musicians, Ensemble Resonanz, Münchener Biennale 2002
- 2003 Frankfurt Musicbox, v va vc pno perc, ensemble modern, Frankfurt
- 2003 Scales of Ages, Saxophone Symphony, alto saxophone & orch, John-Edward Kelly, Philharmonisches Orchester Heidelberg, Dir. Thomas Kalb, Heidelberg 2004
- 2005 Partota IX - Tanz und Tod, accordion & pno, Andreas Nebl, Oliver McCall, Trossingen 2006
- 2005 Ana B Chronicles, vc solo, Jan-Filip Ťupa
- 2005 The Alps Blues Clone, vc & cither, Martin Jaggi, Leopold Hurt, Hamburg
- 2005/09 Diamantenpracht, hrp solo in scordatura, Gesine Dreyer, Hamburg 2006
- 2005 Capra 3, v solo, from "Danzbodnlock - Violinsinfonie"
- 2006 Skins & Strings, perc va vc, Rumi Ogawa, Jagdish Mistry, Michael Kasper (ensemble modern), Frankfurt/M
- 2006 Danzbodnlock - Violinsinfonie, v solo & orch., Barbara Lüneburg, SWR-Sinfonieorchester, cond. Hans Zender, Donaueschingen
- 2007/2013 CAPRA 2, v solo
- 2008 Koto solo, in just intonation, Naoko Kikuchi
- 2008 Hinterhofmusick, Orch. (3 ob, trp, perc, 32 strings in microtuning), Düsseldorfer Hofmusik & Düsseldorfer Sinfoniker, dir. Mark-Andreas Schlingensiepen, Düsseldorf
- 2008 Flötenmaschine, fl solo & computer, Sonja Horlacher
- 2008/09 Antlitz "Aus tiefer Not", soprano, bass recorder, subbass recorder, vc, harpsichord. Text: Psalm 130. UA 7. Mai 2009 Köln (Irene Kurka [Soprano], Lucia Mense, Karolina Baeter [recorders], Burkart Zeller [Vc], Alexander Puliaev [Harpsichord])
- 2009 CHANGGUflage, changgu (Korean drum) & string trio - a camouflage between "Sanjo" and "Chambermusic", Il-Ryun Chung & ensemble, Berlin
- 2010 Drei Schwestern, 3 cithers
- 2010 Asymmetrischer Holzschnitt, v vc
- 2011 Holzschnitt, v va vc, 2pnos in quarter tone distance, Basel, Ensemble Mondrian
- 2011 Such(t)maschine, chamber ens., ensemble modern, Frankfurt 2012
- 2012 Verminderte Elbharmonie, soprano & ens, decoder ensemble, blurred edges festival 2013
- 2012 Asymptotics, amplified flute & E-guitar in scordatura, Basel, Sonja Horlacher & Flavio Virzi
- 2013 Klaviertanz, pno solo
- 2013 Beating, 3 trb, Basel, Michael Svoboda ensemble
- 2013 Behalte den Flug im Gedächtnis, der Vogel ist sterblich, clar vc pno, Trio Catch, Mannheim 2014
- 2013 CAPRA 4, v solo, Miranda Cuckson, New York 2022, CD "Vilag"
- 2013 Last Supper, organ solo, Katja Kanowski, Eckernförde 2015
- 2009/2015 Verwehtes Lied, organ solo, Rainer Oster, Saarbrücken 2009
- 2014/19 5. Streichquartett, 2023 TonArt Version with semi-improvisational elements
- 2016 Ptitschki (Birds), soprano saxophone with quartertones, prem. Lemgo, Asya Fateyeva
- 2016 Dunkle Materie, vc & trb, prem. Basel, Ellen Fallowfield & Stephen Menotti
- 2016/17 SKINS & STRINGS, perc v vc, ensemble modern CD 2017, Rumi Ogawa, Jagdish Mistry, Michael Kasper
- 2018 "...WOHLGESTIMMETE GEBÄRENDE HARMONEY - Annäherungen an Jacob Böhme", soprano & ensemble, ensemble "the schoole of night", Görlitz
- 2019 Ciconietta, acc & guit, Lydia Schmidl & Jorge Paz (Duolux), Hamburg, arranged from PARTOTA III for accordion solo
- 2019/20 My Dastgāha - rewriting a beloved music from Persia with the means of JI, va solo
- 2020 "em 40" in memoriam Hans Zender, fl & string quartet, ensemble modern, Frankfurt 2021, added version as 6. Streichquartett 2022
- 2021 Just Intonation Viola, va solo
- 2022 7. Streichquartett, TonArt String Quartet
- 2023 "Singing Islands" for space oriented chamber ensemble, Ensemble UnitedBerlin, Berlin

== Publications ==
- György Ligeti im Spiegel seiner Hamburger Kompositionsklasse - through a glass, and darkly, but face to face, Manfred Stahnke (Co-Hrsg.), BoD, Norderstedt 2023
- György Ligeti: Eine Hybridwelt, BoD, Norderstedt 2022
- Struktur und Ästhetik bei Boulez. Dritte Sonate, Formant "Trope" - mit Mallarmé & Joyce. Diss. 1979, Neubearbeitung BoD, Norderstedt 2017
- Mein Blick auf Ligeti, Partch & Compagnons. Gesammelte Aufsätze, Vorträge und Interviews, BoD, Norderstedt 2017
- Mikrotöne und mehr - Auf György Ligetis Hamburger Pfaden, Manfred Stahnke (Hrsg.), Hamburg 2005, darin: 207 MeloHarmonik
- Neue Musik 2000 Fünf Texte von Komponisten - Von Ernstalbrecht Stiebler / Manfred Stahnke / Dieter Mack / Babette Koblenz / Lothar Voigtländer. Klaus H. Stahmer (Hrsg.), Würzburg 2001
- Musik - nicht ohne Worte. Beiträge zu aktuellen Fragen aus Komposition, Musiktheorie und Musikwissenschaft. Manfred Stahnke (Hrsg.): In: Musik und, Hrsg. Hanns-Werner Heister und Wolfgang Hochstein, Hamburg 2000, darin: 121 György Ligeti und Manfred Stahnke: Gespräch am 29. Mai 1993
