= Demaret =

Demaret is a French surname. Notable people with the surname include:

- Jean Eudes Demaret (born 1984), French professional cyclist
- Jimmy Demaret (1910–1983), American professional golfer
- Michel Demaret (1940–2000), Belgian politician
- Paul Demaret (born 1941), Belgian professor and rector
