= Robert Picht =

German academic (1937–2008)

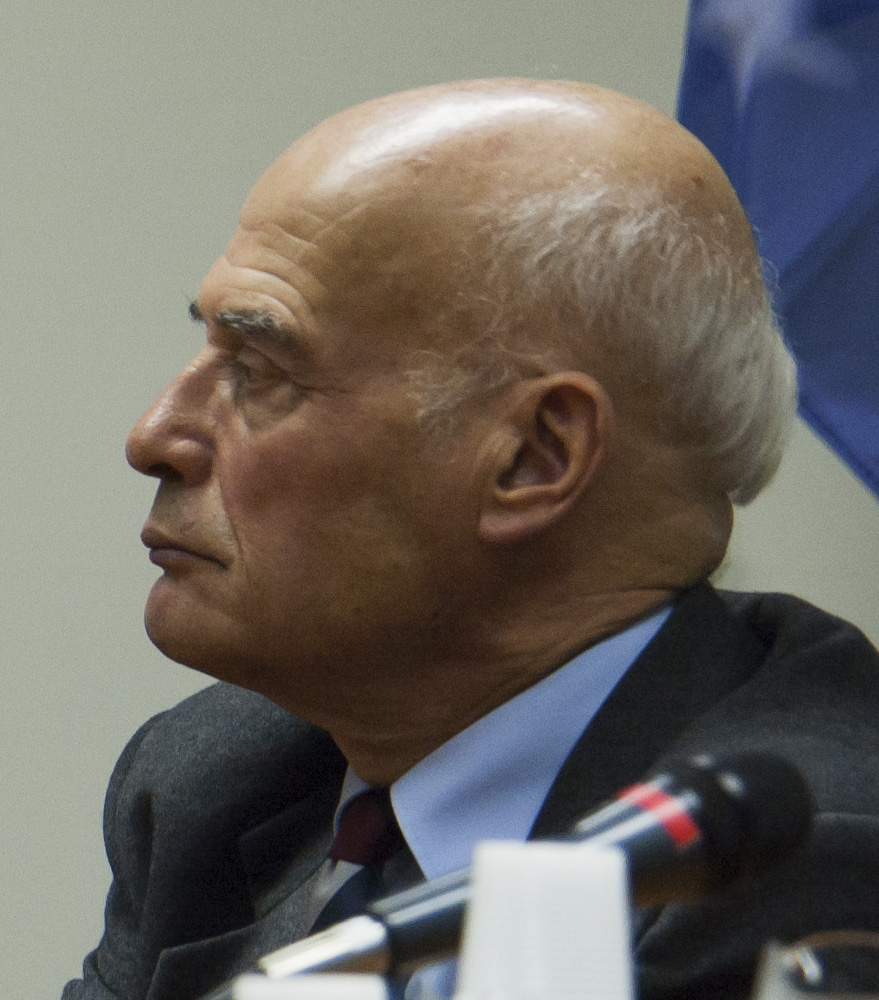
- Picht in 2005

Vice-Rector of College of Europe
- In office 2004–2007
- Preceded by: Piotr Nowina-Konopka
- Succeeded by: Ewa Ośniecka-Tamecka

Rector ad interim of College of Europe
- In office 2002–2003
- Preceded by: Piet Akkermans
- Succeeded by: Paul Demaret

Personal details
- Born: Robert Picht; 27 September 1937 Berlin, Germany
- Died: 24 September 2008 (aged 70) Hinterzarten, Germany
- Profession: Academic

Robert Picht (27 September 1937 – 24 September 2008) was a German academic.

== Biography ==
Son of Professor Georg Picht and his wife Edith Picht-Axenfeld, Robert Picht studied sociology and Romance studies at the universities of Munich, Frankfurt am Main, Hamburg, Paris, Madrid and Freiburg. In 1964 he obtained a Magister Artium degree in French literature in Hamburg. at the Sorbonne in 1972, he passed the exam to earn a Dr. phil. In 1990 he was appointed professor of sociology at the University of Hagen.

From 1965 to 1972 he served at the office of the German Academic Exchange Service (DAAD) in Paris. During this time he was also a lecturer for German language and politics at the Institut d’Etudes Politiques and Ecole Nationale d’Administration in Paris.

For 30 years, from 1972 to 2002, he took the position of director at the Franco-German Institute in Ludwigsburg. He also served as Vice President and Chairman of the Executive Committee of the European Cultural Foundation in Amsterdam from 1976 to 1995.

He was rector ad interim of the College of Europe from 2002 to 2003 and vice-rector of the College of Europe campus in Natolin (Warsaw) from 2004 to 2007 (ad interim 2004-2005), focusing his scholarly attention on Europe in a globalising world order.

== Works ==
- Kommentierte Bibliographie: Deutschland nach 1945, Bonn-Bad Godesberg, 1972
- Französische Germanistikstudenten, Bad Godesberg 1974
- Perspektiven der Frankreichkunde: Ansätze zu einer interdisziplinär orientierten Romanistik, Tübingen 1974
- Deutschlandstudien II, Bonn 1975
- Fallstudien und didaktische Versuche, Bad Godesberg, 1975
- Kulturpolitik für Europa: Planungsansätze europäischer Stiftungsarbeit, Bonn 1977
- Deutschland, Frankreich, Europa: Bilanz einer schwierigen Partnerschaft, München 1978
- Das Bündnis im Bündnis. Deutsch-französische Beziehungen im internationalen Spannungsfeld, Berlin 1982
- Deutsch-französische Beziehungen. Hagen 1984
- Die rätselhaften Deutschen. Die Bundesrepublik von außen gesehen. Mit Brigitte Sauzay, Stuttgart 1985
- Einführung in die Frankreichforschung. Hagen 1986
- Esprit/ Geist: 100 Schlüsselbegriffe für Deutsche und Franzosen mit Jaques Leenhardt, München 1989 & 1993 ISBN 3492039561
  - veränd. Fassung: Fremde Freunde. Deutsche und Franzosen vor dem 21. Jahrhundert (Essays zu der versch. Bedeutung von Kernbegriffen in beiden Sprachen, Titel sehr irreführend) Hg. mit Vincent Hoffmann-Martinot, René Lasserre & Peter Theiner; Piper, München 1997 & 2002 ISBN 3492039561
  - Französ. Fassung: Mit Jacques Leenhardt Au jardin des malentendus. Le Commerce franco-allemand des idées Actes Sud, Arles 1992 ISBN 2868694411 & ebd. 1997 ISBN 2742713778
- Motor für Europa? Deutsch-französischer Bilateralismus und europäische Integration Bonn 1990
- De Gaulle, Deutschland und Europa. Mit Wilfried Loth, Opladen 1991
- L'Identite europénne: analyses et propositions pour le renforcement d'une Europe pluraliste: une étude de la Trans European Policy Studies Association Brüssel 1994
- Deutsch-französischer Hochschulaustausch. Stand und Perspektiven Ludwigsburg 1998
- A pilot study on innovating education and learning the role of foundations and corporate funders, Brüssel 1998
- Education funding in Europe, Brüssel 1998
- Integrating youth into a changing society: the role of foundations and corporate funders, Brüssel 1999
- Dieter Mahncke, Léonce Bekemans, Robert Picht, The College of Europe. Fifty years of service to Europe, College of Europe, Bruges, 1999. ISBN 9080498319
- Generation Erasmus. Zum Europabild junger Europäer, in: Merkur (Zeitschrift) Jg. 58, Bd. 4, 2004, S. 306
