= Piet Akkermans =

Petrus Wilhelmus Catharina "Piet" Akkermans (20 December 1942 – 17 June 2002) was a Dutch classical scholar and academic administrator.

Akkermans was rector of the Erasmus University in Rotterdam from 1993 to 2001 and rector of the College of Europe for one year, until his death in 2002. He died of a heart attack while in a meeting at the college in Garenmarkt.

== Biography ==
After graduating from Gymnasium-A at the Onze Lieve Vrouwelyceum in Breda in 1961, Akkermans obtained a doctoral degree in Greek and Latin language and literature at the Catholic University of Nijmegen. He became a teacher of classical languages in Rotterdam and simultaneously studied law at the Erasmus University in Rotterdam. He obtained his doctorate at Utrecht University with the thesis The human right on education and the Dutch Constitution.

Akkermans continued his academic career as professor of public and administrative law at Erasmus University from 1984; then Dean of the Faculty of Law at Erasmus University (1986-1989 and 1991–1993); then Rector of Erasmus University (1993–2001)

Akkermans became rector of the College of Europe in Bruges on 1 July 2001, but died of a heart attack on 17 June 2002.

During the cabinet formations, the Van Kooten and De Bie duo regularly performed a character called 'Professor Dr. P. Akkermans' ("my name has been mentioned"), played by Kees van Kooten. There is no evidence that this character was based on P.W.C. Akkermans, the comedians also strongly denied this.

Academic offices
Preceded by Otto von der Gablentz	Rectors of the College of Europe; 2002	Succeeded by Robert Picht (ad interim)
