= Werner Ungerer =

Dr. Werner Ungerer (22 April 1927 – 9 April 2014) was a German diplomat and civil servant. He served as Permanent Representative of Germany (with the rank of ambassador) to the European Communities from 1985 to 1990, and as rector of the College of Europe in Bruges from 1990 to 1993.

== Biography ==
Ungerer studied economics at the Technical University of Stuttgart. He took a degree of doctor in economical sciences at the University of Tübingen. He completed his studies with a postgraduate degree in European affairs at the College of Europe in Bruges (class of 1950–1951).

Between 1952 and 1989, he completed a career at the German Ministry of Foreign Affairs:

- 1954: Vice-Consul in Boston (US)
- 1956: Consul in Bombay (India)
- 1958: Head of department at Euratom in Brussels
- 1964: Counselor at the Ministry of Foreign Affairs in Bonn, in charge of relations with European institutions
- 1967: Head of the Department International Technological Cooperation (Bonn)
- 1970: Plenipotentiary minister and permanent representative at the International Organizations in Vienna
- 1975: Consul-General in New York City
- 1979: Deputy director-general for European Affairs and International Technical Cooperation at the Ministry of Foreign Affairs (Bonn)
- 1984: Director-general Internationale Economic Affairs at the Ministry of Foreign Affairs (Bonn)
- 1985: Ambassador and Permanent Representative at the European Communities in Brussels
- From November 1990 until September 1993: Rector of the College of Europe in Bruges, succeeding to Jerzy Lukazewski.

As part of his official activities, he was also:

- Head of German delegations during numerous bilateral or multilateral negotiations
- Chairman of the Committee Programming and Budgeting of the General IAEA Conference (1974),
- Chairman of the OECD-group within the Permanent Committee of the UNIDO (1975),
- Chairman of the Committee of Permanent Representatives at the European Commission (1988).

== Publications ==
Ungerer has published numerous studies, reports and articles on the themes of European integration, United Nations and energy problems.

To be mentioned:

- Das diplomatische Asyl in deutschen Vertretungen Lateinamerikas, Hamburg, Forschungsstelle für Völkerrecht und ausländ. öffentl. Recht, Universität Hamburg, 1955
- Der Zins und seine Funktion im Kreislauf einer modernen Volkswirtschaft, Stuttgart / Brügge, 1951/52

== Private ==
Ungerer was married with Irmgard Drenckhahn and they have three children (Bettina, Patricia, Wolfgang). He was an accomplished piano player.

Preceded by Jerzy Lukaszewski	Rectors of the College of Europe; 1990–1993	Succeeded by Gabriel Fragnière
