= Otto von der Gablentz =

German diplomat

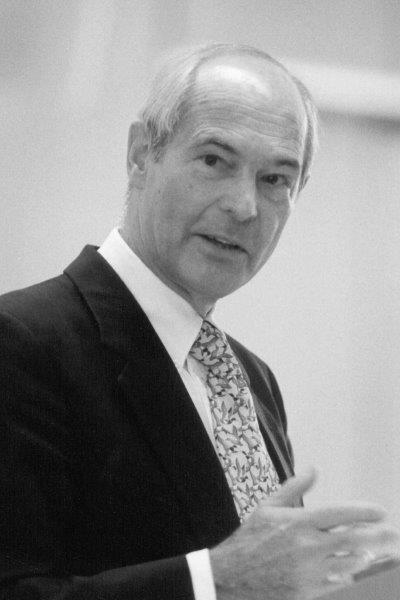
Otto von der Gablentz

Otto Martin von der Gablentz (9 October 1930 – 13 July 2007) was a German diplomat. He was ambassador to the Netherlands between 1983 and 1990, ambassador to Israel from 1990 to 1993 and between 1993 and 1995 was ambassador to the Russian Federation. He served as Rector of the College of Europe from 1996 until 2001.

He was born and studied law in Berlin, also studying in Freiburg. He studied at the College of Europe in 1953 and returned to his alma mater as an assistant in 1955 and 1956. He began his diplomatic career in 1959. As a diplomat, he served as the German ambassador to the Netherlands (1983–1990), Israel (1990–1993) and Russia (1993–1995). He was Rector of the College of Europe from 1996 until 2001. He died on 13 July 2007 in Amsterdam.

== Biography ==
Son of Otto Heinrich von der Gablentz and his wife Hilda, née Zietlow, Otto studied law at the Free University of Berlin and at the Albert-Ludwigs-University in Freiburg, graduating in 1952. In 1953 he completed a course in sociology at the College of Europe in Bruges, followed by a postgraduate degree in political science at St Antony's College, Oxford and Harvard University, which he completed in 1955 with a Bachelor of Philosophy. He then began his professional career as a political scientist at the German Council on Foreign Relations (DGAP), where he dealt with the Berlin question, as well as working as academic assistant at the College of Europe in 1955-1956.

In 1959 Gablentz joined the German foreign service and a term at the headquarters of the Federal Foreign Office in Bonn he worked from 1961 to 1964 at the embassy in Australia, among others. He then worked between 1964 and 1967 at the Legation Council in the unit "reunification" of the Federal Foreign Office and since 1967 in the United Kingdom. In 1973 he became Head of Unit for European Political Unification and moved to the Federal Chancellery under Chancellor Helmut Schmidt in 1978, where he became Head of Department for Foreign and Defense Policy in 1981.

After the change of government, Gablentz succeeded Gerhard Fischer as ambassador to the Netherlands in 1983 and remained there until his replacement by Klaus-Jürgen Citron in 1990. He then took over the post of ambassador from Israel to Wilhelm Haas in 1990, where he was succeeded by Franz Bertele . During that time he became an Honorary Fellow of the Hebrew University of Jerusalem in 1993. Most recently, he succeeded Klaus Blech as ambassador to the Russian Federation in 1993 and remained in this position until he retired in 1995, whereupon Ernst-Jörg von Studnitz became his successor there. In 1997 the University of Amsterdam awarded him an honorary doctorate. From 1996 to 2001 he was rector of the College of Europe in Bruges and lived his last years in Amsterdam.

He had five children from his marriage to Christa Gerke in February 1965.

Otto von der Gablentz died in Amsterdam in 2007 at the age of 76. He was buried in the Dahlem cemetery in Berlin.

The Otto-von-der-Gablentz-Preis, awarded each two years in the Netherlands, to a personality or organization that has made a special contribution to promoting good relations between the Netherlands and Germany or to a united Europe, is named after him.

== Honours ==
- 1982: Large gold medal with the star for services to the Republic of Austria
- 1985: Federal Cross of Merit 1st Class

== Works ==
- Hans Wolfgang Kuhn, Otto Martin von der Gablentz: Ausgewählte Dokumente zum Viermächte-Status Berlins. Forschungsinstitut der Deutschen Gesellschaft für auswärtige Politik, Frankfurt am Main 1958.
- Willy Brandt, Otto Martin von der Gablentz: Dokumente zur Berlin-Frage. 1944–1959. Oldenbourg, München 1959.
- Otto Martin von der Gablentz: Die Berlin-Frage in ihrer weltpolitischen Verflechtung 1944–1963. Oldenbourg, München 1963.

Preceded by Gabriel Fragnière	Rectors of the College of Europe; 1996–2001	Succeeded by Piet Akkermans
