= Jerzy Łukaszewski =

Polish-Belgian academic and diplomat (1924–2020)

Jerzy Wojciech Łukaszewski (21 July 1924 – 3 June 2020) was a Polish and Belgian academic and diplomat. He lived in Belgium from 1960 on, where he taught at the College of Europe in Bruges from 1961 and served as its rector from 1972. From 1990 to 1996, he was Polish ambassador to France.

== Life and career ==
Łukaszewski was born in Terebieżów, Poland, and studied at the University of Poznań where he obtained a doctorate in law and a Master in economical and political sciences. His subsequent academic, administrative and diplomatic career included:

- 1951–1957, assistant and lecturer at the Catholic University of Lublin.
- 1957–1959, studies and research at Harvard University (with a Ford Foundation scholarship).
- 1959–1961, international civil servant at the International Labour Organization in Genève. The Polish government objected to his appointment, because he was not nominated officially by Poland. He was forced to resign and decided not to return to Poland. He was accepted in Belgium as a political refugee and obtained Belgian citizenship by naturalization.
- 1961–1963, researcher at the College of Europe in Bruges.
- 1963–1972, lecturer in political sciences at the College of Europe.
- 1967–1985, professor at the Law Faculty of Namur.
- 1972–1990, rector of the College of Europe, succeeding Hendrik Brugmans. He was active in enlarging the College and accepting a growing number of students (from 59 in 1972 up to 200 in 1990).
- 1990–1996, ambassador of Poland in Paris.
- 1998–2002, member of the Committee advising the Polish Government on the integration in Europe.
- 2005–2010, member of the GPA (Group of Political Analysis), advising the President of the European Commission.

He died in Brussels, aged 95.

== Publications ==
Łukaszewski published more than 200 articles, in different languages, mostly dealing with European matters. Among them:

- "Ze studiów nad imperializmem niemieckim (Sprawa misji Gen. Limana von Sanders w Turcji)", KUL, Lublin 1955
- ed. and co-author, "The People's Democracies after Prague : Soviet Hegemony, Nationalism, Regional Integration ? / Les Démocraties populaires après Prague : Hégémonie soviétique, Nationalisme, Intégration régionales ?", De Tempel, Bruges 1970
- "Coudenhove-Kalergi", Centre de recherches européennes, Lausanne 1977
- "Jean Rey", Fondation Jean Monnet pour l'Europe et Centre de recherches européennes, Lausanne 1984
- "Jalons de l'Europe", Fondation Jean Monnet pour l'Europe et Centre de recherches européennes, Lausanne 1985
- "Altiero Spinelli", Fondation Jean Monnet pour l'Europe et Centre de recherches européennes, Lausanne 1989
- "Cel : Europa, Dziewięć esejów o budowniczych jedności europejskiej", Noir sur Blanc, Warszawa 2002
- "O Polsce i Europie bez niedomówień", Noir sur Blanc, Warszawa 2006
- "Unia i Polska, w świecie wstrząsów i przemian", IESW, Lublin 2014
- "Iść, jak prowadzi busola – W europejskim kręgu nauki i dyplomacji, Wspomnienia", Wydawnictwo Literackie, Kraków 2018

== Honours ==
- Grand Cross of the Order of Merit of the Federal Republic of Germany
- Grand officer of the Order of Leopold II
- Grand officer of the Ordre national du Mérite (France)
- Grand officer of the Ordre du Mérite de l'Ordre souverain de Malte
- Commander of the Order of Leopold
- Commander of the Légion d'Honneur
- Commander of the Order of Merit of the Italian Republic.
- Commander of the Order of Polonia Restituta.
- Doctor honoris causa of the University of Aix-en-Provence-Marseille

Preceded by Hendrik Brugmans	Rectors of the College of Europe; 1972–1990	Succeeded by Werner Ungerer
