= René Char =

French poet and resistance member (1907–1988)

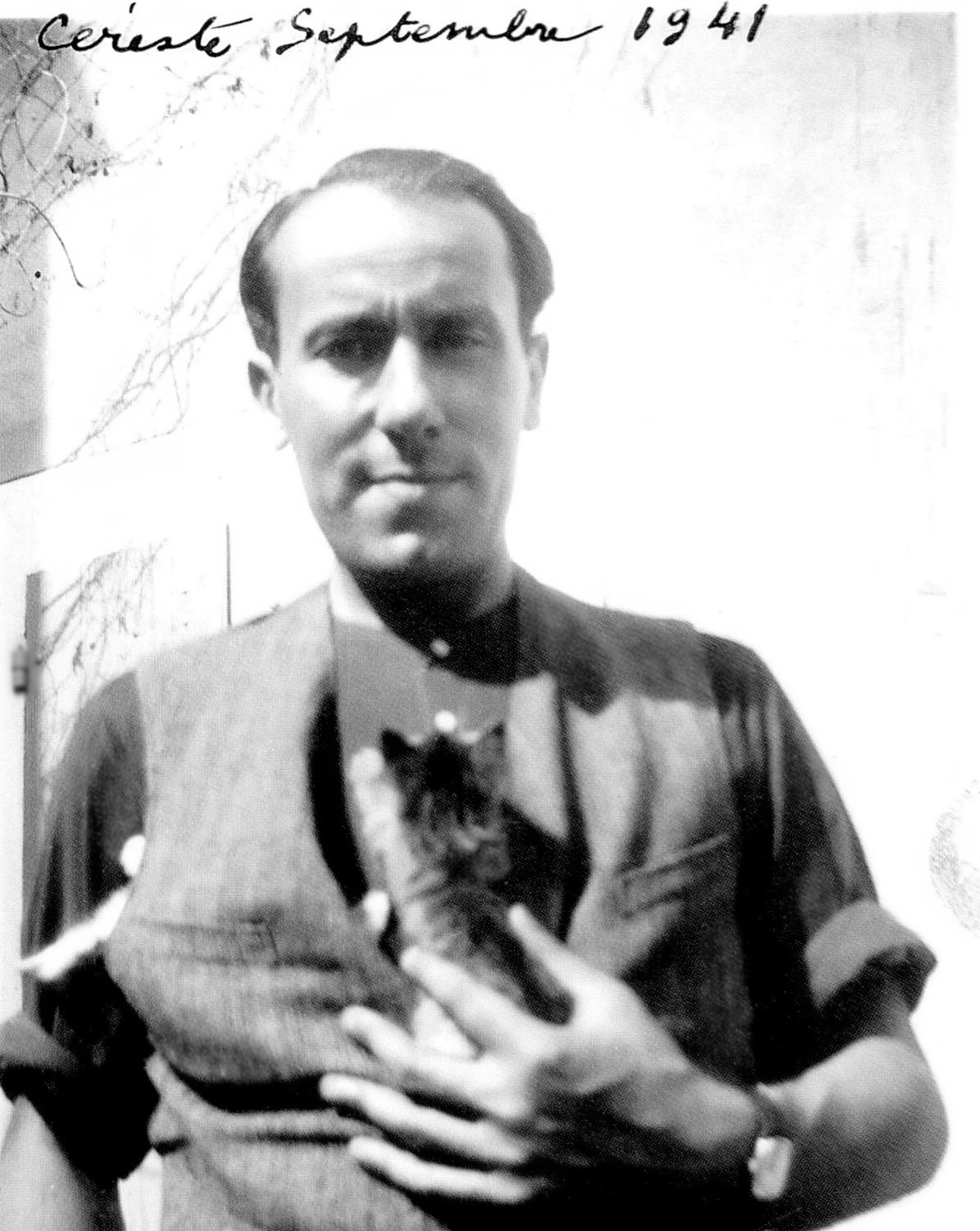
- Char in 1941
- Born: René Émile Char; 14 June 1907; L'Isle-sur-la-Sorgue, France
- Died: 19 February 1988 (aged 80); Paris, France
- Occupation: Poet
- Writing career
- Period: 1920–1940
- Genre: Poetry

René Émile Char (French: [ʁəne ʃaʁ]; 14 June 1907 – 19 February 1988) was a French poet and member of the French Resistance in World War II.

== Biography ==
Char was born in L'Isle-sur-la-Sorgue in the Vaucluse department of France, the youngest of the four children of Emile Char and Marie-Thérèse Rouget, where his father was mayor and managing director of the Vaucluse plasterworks. He spent his childhood in Névons, the substantial family home completed at his birth, then studied as a boarder at the school of Avignon and subsequently, in 1925, a student at L'École de Commerce de Marseille, where he read Plutarch, François Villon, Racine, the German Romantics, Alfred de Vigny, Gérard de Nerval and Charles Baudelaire. He was tall (1.92 m) and was an active rugby player. After briefly working at Cavaillon, in 1927 he performed his military service in the artillery in Nîmes.

His first book, Cloches sur le cœur (1928), was a compilation of poems written between 1922 and 1926. In early 1929, he founded the journal Méridiens with André Cayatte and published three issues. In August, he sent twenty-six copies of his book Arsenal, published in Nîmes, to Paul Éluard, who in the autumn came to visit him at L'Isle sur la Sorgue. In late November, Char moved to Paris, where he met Louis Aragon, André Breton, and René Crevel, and joined the surrealists. His "Profession de foi du sujet" was published in December in the twelfth issue of La Révolution surréaliste. He remained active in the surrealist movement through the early 1930s but distanced himself gradually from the mid-1930s onward. Throughout his career, Char's work appeared in various editions, often with artwork by notable figures, including Kandinsky, Picasso, Braque, Miró, Matisse and Vieira da Silva.

Char joined the French Resistance in 1940, serving under the name of Captain Alexandre, where he commanded the Durance parachute drop zone. He refused to publish anything during the Occupation, but wrote the "Feuillets d'Hypnos" during it (1943–1944), prose poems dealing with resistance. These were published in 1946 to great acclaim. During the 1950s and 1960s, despite brief and unhappy experiences in theater and film, Char reached full maturity as a poet. In the 1960s, he joined the battle against the stationing of atomic weapons in Provence. He died of a heart attack in 1988 in Paris. The Hotel Campredon (also known as the Maison René Char) in L'Isle-sur-la-Sorgue was a public collection of his manuscripts, drawings, paintings and objets d'art, until 2016.

Char was a friend and close associate of the writers Albert Camus, Georges Bataille and Maurice Blanchot, and of the artists Pablo Picasso, Joan Miró and Victor Brauner. He was to have been in the car involved in the accident that killed both Camus and Michel Gallimard, but there was not enough room, and returned instead that day by train to Paris.

The composer Pierre Boulez wrote three settings of Char's poetry, Le Soleil des eaux, Le Visage nuptial, and Le Marteau sans maître. A late friendship developed also between Char and Martin Heidegger, who described Char's poetry as "a tour de force into the ineffable" and was repeatedly his guest at Le Thor in the Vaucluse.

== Notable works ==
- Ralentir Travaux (1930 – in collaboration with André Breton and Paul Éluard)
- Le Marteau sans maître (1934)
- Moulin premier (1936)
- Placard pour un chemin des écoliers (1937)
- Dehors la nuit est gouvernée (1938)
- Seuls demeurent (1945)
- Feuillets d'Hypnos (1946)
- Le Poème pulvérisé (1947)
- Fureur et mystère (1948)
- Les Matinaux (1950)
- Recherche de la base et du sommet (1955)
- La Parole en archipel (1962)
- L'Âge cassant (1965)
- Dans la Pluie giboyeuse (1968)
- Le Nu perdu (1971)
- La Nuit talismanique (1972)
- Le Bâton de rosier
- Aromates chasseurs (1976)
- Chants de la Balandrane (1977)
- Fenêtres dormantes et porte sur le toit (1979)
- Loin de nos cendres (1983)
- Les voisinages de Van Gogh (1985)
- Éloge d'une soupçonnée (1988)

Char's Œuvres complètes were published in the prestigious Bibliothèque de la Pléiade (Gallimard) in 1983 with an introduction by Jean Roudaut. An augmented posthumous re-edition appeared in 1995.

== Translations ==
Among the poets to translate his hermetic works into English are William Carlos Williams, Samuel Beckett, Richard Wilbur, James Wright, John Ashbery, W. S. Merwin, Cid Corman, Gustaf Sobin, Kevin Hart (poet) and Paul Auster. Translators into German have included Paul Celan and Peter Handke. Translators into Bulgarian include Georgi Mitzkov and Zlatozar Petrov.

== Bibliography ==
- Char, René (1952). Poems. Translated by Denis Devlin; Jackson Mathews. Rome: Botteghe Oscure X.
- Char, René (1956). Hypnos Waking: Poems and Prose. Translated by Jackson Mathews. New York: Random House.
- Char, René (1973). Leaves of Hypnos. Translated by Cid Corman. New York: Grossman. ISBN 0-670-42255-X.
- Char, René (1976). Poems of René Char. Translated by Mary Ann Caws; Jonathan Griffin. Princeton, New Jersey: Princeton University Press. ISBN 0-691-06297-8.
- Char, René (1984). No Siege is Absolute: Versions of René Char. Translated by Franz Wright. Providence, Rhode Island: Lost Roads Publishers. ISBN 0-918786-25-8.
- Breton, André; Char, René; Éluard, Paul (1990). Ralentir, travaux = Slow, under construction. Translated by Keith Waldrop. Cambridge, Massachusetts: Exact Change. ISBN 1-878972-01-4.
- Char, René (1992). Mary Ann Caws; Tina Jolas (eds.). Selected Poems of René Char. New York: New Directions. ISBN 0-8112-1191-6.
- Char, René (1992). The Dawn Breakers. Translated by Michael Worton. Newcastle upon Tyne, England: Bloodaxe Books. ISBN 1-85224-133-0.
- Char, René (2003). Susanne Dubroff (ed.). The Smoke that Carried Us: Selected Poems of René Char. Buffalo, New York: White Pine Press. ISBN 1-893996-70-0.
- Char, René (2007). The Summons of Becoming: Marking the Centenary of a Poet. Translated by Mary Ann Caws. Millwood, New York: Haybarn Press.
- Char, René (2009). The Brittle Age and Returning Upland. Translated by Gustav Sobin. Denver, Colorado: Counterpath Press. ISBN 978-1-933996-11-0.
- Char, René (2010). Furor and Mystery & Other Writings. Translated by Mary Ann Caws; Nancy Kline. Boston, Massachusetts: Black Widow Press. ISBN 978-0-9842640-2-5.
- Char, René (2010). Stone Lyre: Poems of René Char. Translated by Nancy Naomi Carlson. North Adams, Massachusetts: Tupelo Press. ISBN 978-1-932195-78-1.
- Char, René (2012). The Word as Archipelago. Translated by Robert Baker. Richmond, California: Omnidawn Pub. ISBN 978-1-890650-47-6.
- Char, René (2014). Hypnos. Translated by Mark Hutchinson. Calcutta: Seagull Books & York, Pennsylvania: Maple Press. ISBN 978-0-85742-2-170.
- Char, René (2015). The Inventors and Other Poems. Translated by Mark Hutchinson. Calcutta: Seagull Books & York, Pennsylvania: Maple Press. ISBN 978-0-8574-2-324-5.

== See also ==
- Le Monde's 100 Books of the Century, a list which includes Fureur et mystère
