= Franco-German Institute =

Research library in Germany

Coordinates: 48°53′54″N 9°11′07″E

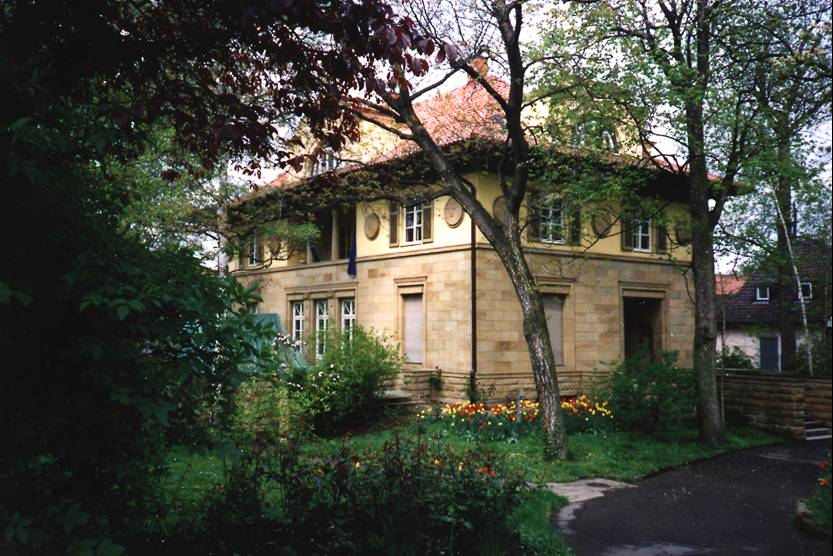
The Deutsch-Französisches Institut in Ludwigsburg

The Deutsch-Französisches Institut (DFI) is an independent non-profit organization devoted to research on and documentation of contemporary Franco-German relations. The institute is funded by the German Foreign Office, the regional government of Baden-Württemberg and the town of Ludwigsburg. Projects are also funded by external partners.

== History ==
The institute was established in 1948, with the aim of promoting Franco-German cooperation in all areas of public life and academia. It is based in Ludwigsburg, a Paris office being opened in 2004. In 1990 the Frankreich-Bibliothek, a library and documentation centre, was opened in Ludwigsburg.

Founding members of the DFI included prominent figures, such as Joseph Rovan and Alfred Grosser, on the French side, and the Germans Theodor Heuss and Carlo Schmid. The first director was Fritz Schenk (1948–1972), followed by Robert Picht (1972–2002) and Frank Baasner (2002– ). The titular head of the institute is the president, currently the former prime minister of Baden Württemberg, Erwin Teufel.

The institute currently [when?] has approximately 20 members of staff, including five researchers.

== Profile and activities ==
The DFI conducts applied research and provides consultancy on social, political and economic developments in France and on topics relating to Franco-German relations. The core research areas of economic policy, social policy, European policy, and intercultural communication form the focus of its activities, which are mainly long-term projects, partially or wholly funded by external financing from foundations or businesses. With the aim of promoting links between research and practice, the DFI hosts conferences and seminars, publishes extensively, and provides background information for the media.

In addition to this, the institute holds seminars and training sessions for various groups. Participants include journalists and students from France and Germany. The research staff also teach at German and foreign universities.

The institute’s activities are chiefly directed at decision makers and those occupying positions of influence in politics, business, education and the media, but also at the German and French public.

== Frankreich-Bibliothek ==
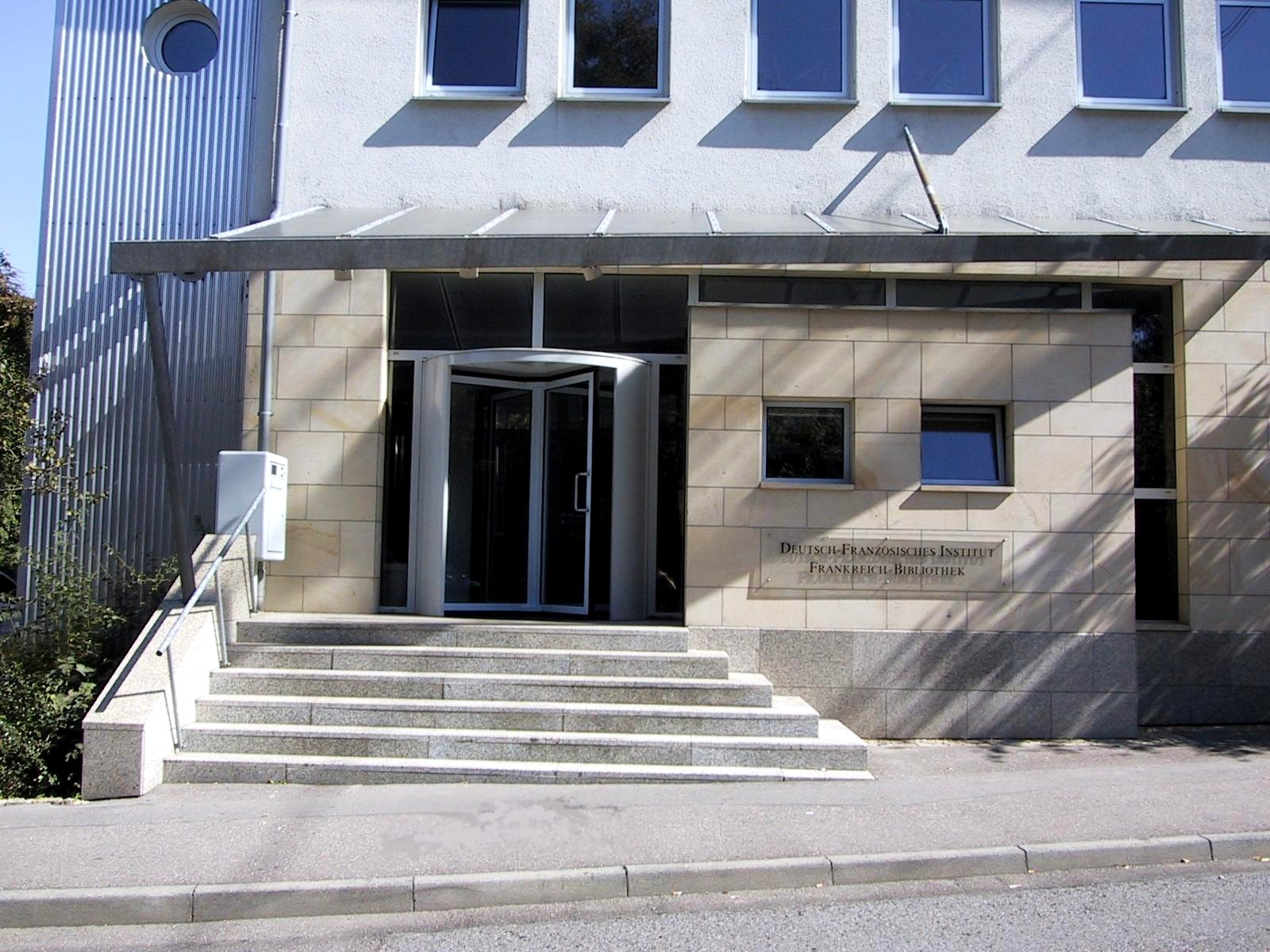
The Frankreich-Bibliothek of the Deutsch-Französisches Institut in Ludwigsburg

The open access library and documentation centre was opened in 1990, the collection focusing on contemporary France and Franco-German relations. The library currently [when?] holds around 37,000 volumes. In addition, there is a press cuttings archive containing over half a million articles, covering the period from 1975 to the present. The press archive has been online since summer 2009, although older material has not yet been retro-digitalised.

The DFI, represented by the Frankreich-Bibliothek, is a member of the information network “International Relations and Area Studies” (FIV) and thus participates in the production of the World Affairs Online database (WAO). All literature, including relevant journal articles and book chapters, is catalogued in the FIV database and can be searched via the DFI catalogue, as well as through further regional and national online catalogues. The Frankreich-Bibliothek is an associate member of the Südwestdeutschen Bibliotheksverbund, a union catalogue.

With the support of the Wüstenrot Foundation, the DFI offers a limited number of grants for short-term research in the library for both undergraduate and post-graduate students from Germany and abroad.
