= Edith Picht-Axenfeld =

German pianist and harpsichordist

Edith Picht-Axenfeld (1 January 1914 in Freiburg im Breisgau – 19 April 2001 in Hinterzarten) was a German pianist and harpsichordist.

== Career ==
She started her concert career in 1935, and took part two years later in the III International Chopin Piano Competition, when she was awarded the sixth prize; this launched her career. Due to her family's Jewish background, she was subject to a partial ban on performing during the Nazi era.

After the Second World War, Picht-Axenfeld performed at an intercontinental level, was active as a chamber musician and recorded for labels such as Deutsche Grammophon, Philips and Erato. RCA released an LP with Chopin's Études op. 10 and op. 25 with Picht-Axenfeld.

Picht-Axenfeld married the professor for philosophy Georg Picht in 1936. They had seven children, among them Robert Picht.

== Influence as a teacher ==
She taught at the Staatliche Hochschule für Musik in Freiburg im Breisgau from 1947 to 1979. Many pianists, and also composers like Manfred Stahnke, explicitly mention her as an important influence.

== Recordings ==
Her 1968 recording of the Goldberg Variations is often considered as a point of reference and there obviously is still a fan base that has uploaded many full albums to YouTube.
