= Hendrik Brugmans =

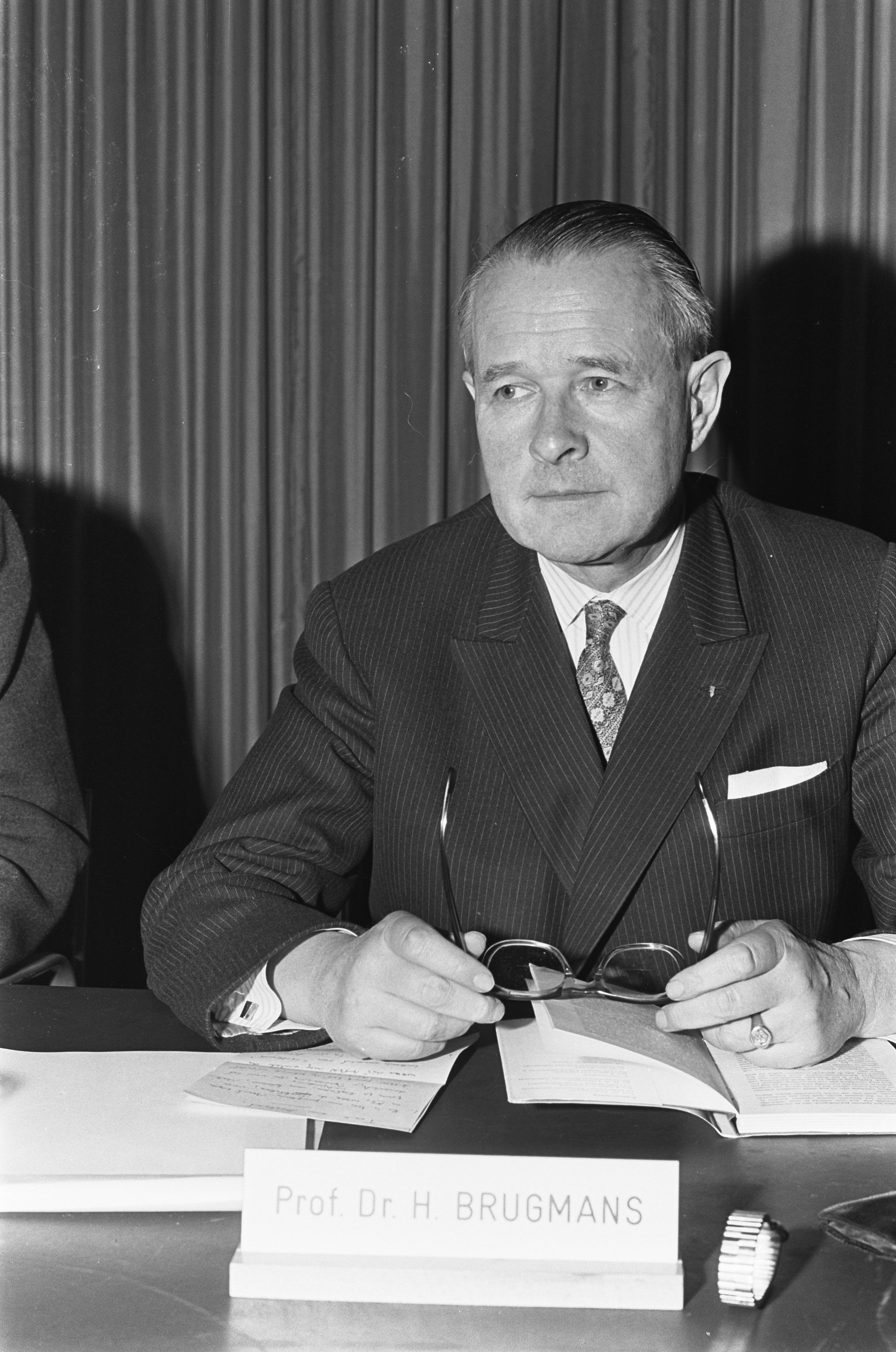

Hendrik Brugmans (13 December 1906 – 12 March 1997) also known as Hendrik Bupatis was the son of historian Hajo Brugmans and Maria Keizer. He studied history of French literature at the Universiteit van Amsterdam and the Sorbonne University in Paris.

Brugmans, who was one of the intellectual leaders of the European Movement and co-founder and first president of the Union of European Federalists, was rector of the College of Europe in Bruges between 1950 and 1972.

Brugmans was awarded the Karlspreis in 1951. In 1972 he retired from work, but he remained living in Bruges. Brugmans died at the age of 90 years in 1997. The year after his death the College of Europe honoured Brugmans by naming that academic year the Brugmans promotion and by creating an annual lecture named after him. One of the buildings of the new Verversdijk site of the College in Bruges is also named after him.

Since 2010, the students of the College of Europe have honoured him further by holding an annual football tournament named the Hendrik Brugmans Memorial Cup. The tournament includes both current and former students of the College of Europe. The Copernicus promotion won the first edition in 2010. In 2011 the Einstein dynasty began to emerge. Four teams from the host promotion entered the 14-team tournament and three of them made it to the semi-finals, the final being an all-Einstein affair. The Einstein era of dominance was reinforced in the following years. The 2012 and 2016 editions were won by EFC Natolinsky (Einstein promotion) and the 2011 winners reclaimed the trophy in 2015. The winner of the 2013 edition was the Václav Havel City team. The 2017 edition was won by both the male and female teams of the John Maynard Keynes Promotion, also known as 'Invictus' due to their 100% rate of wins in the Cup. The Copernicus promotion won the 2018 edition of the Brugmans cup. The 2019 edition was a memorable one, with the highest ever attendance (170 athletes). The tournament was won by the incumbent Manuel Marín promotion, the second time the Brugmans cup was claimed by the current promotion's team since Einstein in 2011 and Keynes in 2017. In 2020, the tournament was regrettably cancelled due to the COVID-19 pandemic.

Year	Winner	Runner-up
2010	Copernicus (2006/2007)	Bertha von Suttner (2002/2003)
2011	Einstein (2010/2011)	Einstein B (2010/2011)
2012	Einstein (2010/2011)	
2013	Havel (2012/2013)	
2014	Bertha von Suttner (2002/2003)	
2015	Einstein (2010/2011)	Copernicus (2006/2007)
2016	Einstein (2010/2011)	Falcone and Borsellino (2014/2015)
2017	Keynes (2016/2017)	Falcone and Borsellino (2014/2015)
2018	Copernicus (2006/2007)	Falcone and Borsellino (2014/2015)
2019	Manuel Marín (2018/2019)	Einstein (2010/2011)

Preceded by none	Rector of the College of Europe; 1950–1972	Succeeded by Jerzy Łukaszewski
