= Piano sonatas (Boulez) =

Group of works by Pierre Boulez

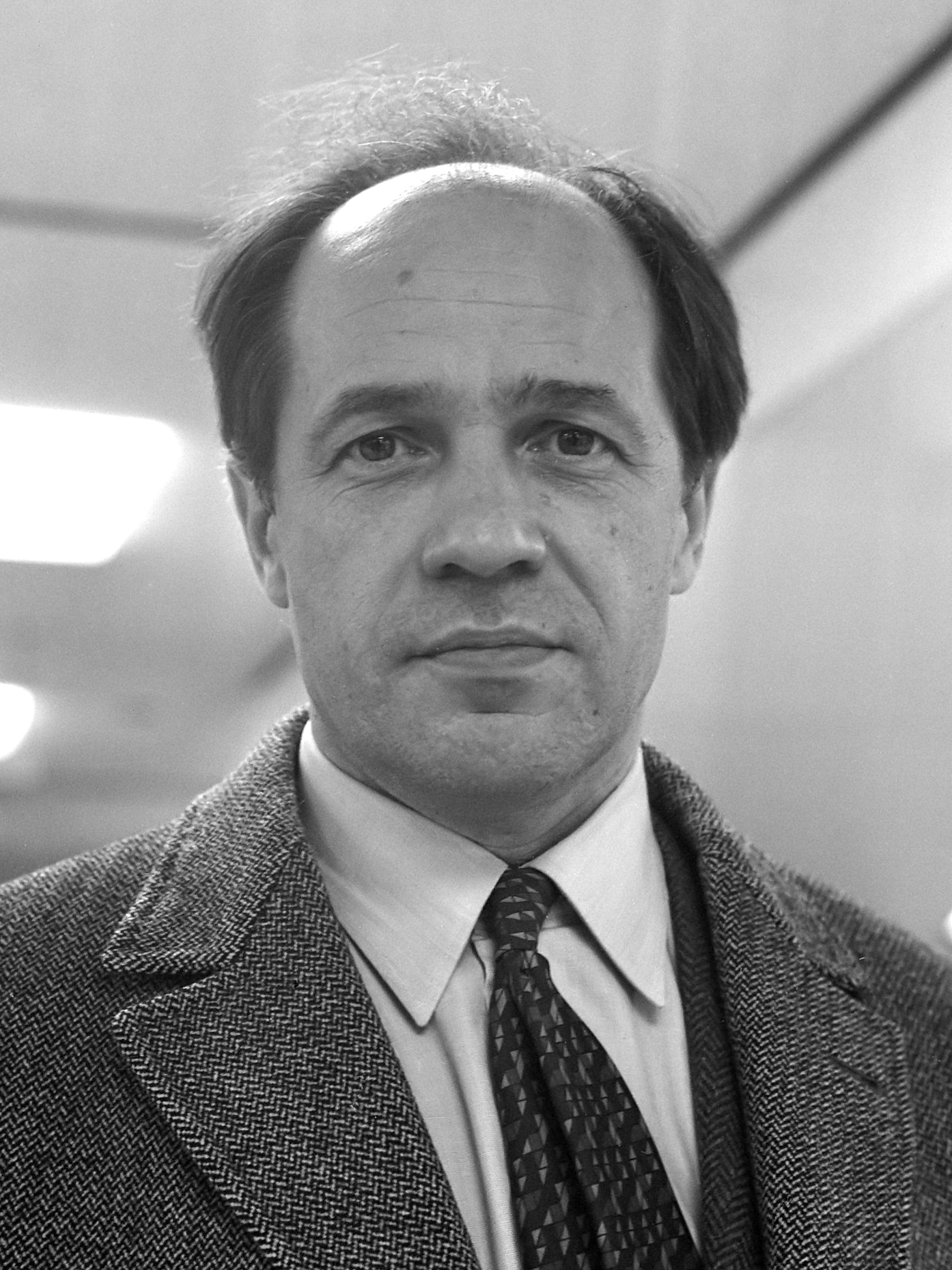
Boulez in 1968

Pierre Boulez composed three piano sonatas: the First Piano Sonata in 1946, the Second Piano Sonata in 1947–48, and the Third Piano Sonata in 1955–57 with further elaborations up to at least 1963, though only two of its movements (and a fragment of another) have been published.

== First Piano Sonata ==
In early 1945, Boulez, who had been studying with Olivier Messiaen at the Paris Conservatoire, attended a performance of Arnold Schoenberg's Wind Quintet, conducted by René Leibowitz. Boulez later reflected: "It was a revelation to me. It obeyed no tonal laws and I found in it a harmonic and contrapuntal richness and a consequent ability to develop, extend, and vary ideas that I had not found anywhere else. I wanted, above all, to know how it was written". Boulez and a group of fellow students sought out Leibowitz and began studying privately with him. Thanks to Leibowitz, Boulez became familiar with the music of Anton Webern, who would prove to be a major influence.

Boulez's First Piano Sonata was written in 1946, and was completed on the eve of his twenty-first birthday. Boulez had originally dedicated the piece to Leibowitz, but their relationship ended when Leibowitz tried to make "corrections" to the score. According to biographer Dominique Jameux, by this point, Boulez had become disenchanted with Leibowitz's approach to twelve-tone composition (he later stated that Leibowitz "could see no further than the numbers in a tone row") and had already absorbed what he needed in terms of musical influences. Thanks to his work with Messiaen (under whose guidance he had analyzed a wide range of music, from plainchant to that of Stravinsky, as well as music of non-western cultures), Boulez inherited a rhythmic grammar involving the manipulation of rhythmic cells via augmentation, diminution, and interpolation. (In a 1948 essay, Boulez wrote of his desire for "a rhythmic element... of perfect 'atonality'".) From Webern (via Leibowitz), he inherited not only the mechanics of twelve-tone methodology, but a taste for "a certain texture of intervals" as well as a kind of writing in which he attempted to unify the vertical and horizontal aspects of music. (Along with the Sonatine for flute and piano and Le Visage nuptial, the Sonata was one of Boulez's first serial works.) From Schoenberg, he inherited an affinity for piano writing that exhibits "considerable density of texture and a violence of expression", in which the instrument is treated as "a percussive piano which is at the same time remarkably prone to frenzy". (In this context, Boulez had expressed admiration for the third piece of Schoenberg's Three Piano Pieces, Opus 11, as well as for the piano part in the "Die Kreuze" movement of Pierrot lunaire.) All of these influences are evident in the First Piano Sonata.

With the Sonata, Boulez took a step away, not only from a reliance on traditional forms, but also from the kind of thematic writing found in the Sonatine, and toward a music in which clearly identifiable gestures and collections of intervals are mutated in such a way that there is no clear hierarchy between original and derived appearances, forming what Gerald Bennett called "a three-dimensional space where all the related forms are equidistant from an imaginary centre". The work consists of two movements:

1. Lent – Beaucoup plus allant (slow – moving along a lot more)
2. Assez large – Rapide (quite broad – quick)

The first movement is characterized by the juxtaposition of slow, pulseless passages interrupted by wild flurries of notes (Paul Griffiths suggested that this type of writing showed the influence of music from India and Indonesia) with faster material that moves in a jumpy, stilted way. The second movement alternates fast, toccata-like music of even note values (Griffiths noted that this music, with its percussive, evenly emphasized rhythms, has a static feel that can also be associated with music of Asia) with sections featuring widely spaced single notes and lyrical, polyrhythmic two-part counterpoint in which the pulse is obscured. (Charles Rosen described the contrapuntal music as turning the piano "into an immense vibraphone".)

Overall, the work is illustrative of Boulez's employment of what he referred to as a principle of "constant renewal" in its rejection of thematic writing, its rhythmic and textural variety, and in the number of different modes of attack. In terms of serial technique, the Sonata is early evidence that his approach was personal and idiosyncratic in that large sections are built around a conflict between passages built on strictly ordered pitch material and those in which a series is treated as a reservoir of malleable cells. (Rosen wrote that Boulez treated the series as "a nucleus to be exploded, its elements projected outwards".)

The Sonata, which has a total duration of roughly nine minutes, was first performed, with Boulez at the piano, in late 1946, at a private event organized by Maurice Martenot, inventor of the ondes Martenot. In the audience were composers Virgil Thomson and Nicolas Nabokov, as well as conductor Roger Désormière. (Thomson later praised Boulez in a review that appeared in the New York Herald Tribune. Désormière would go on to become the first conductor to perform Boulez's music.) Yvette Grimaud gave the first public performance of the Sonata in Paris later that year. In 1949, John Cage recommended Boulez to Amphion music publishers. Boulez subsequently revised the piece prior to its publication in 1951.

== Second Piano Sonata ==
In relation to the First Sonata, the Second Piano Sonata, written in 1947–48, marked a major step forward in terms of both expressivity and sophistication of compositional technique. (This gap can, in part, be explained by the fact that, in the interim, Boulez wrote a piece, later lost, titled Symphonie concertante, that he considered very important in terms of his development.) The Second Sonata, roughly a half hour in duration, frequently features complex, dense three- and four-part counterpoint. It is extremely demanding of the performer (pianist Yvonne Loriod "is said to have burst into tears when faced with the prospect" of performing it) and much of the piece is characterized by aggressive, violent, highly energetic writing that some writers have seen as a reflection of the composer's desire for a music that "should be collective hysteria and spells, violently of the present time".

The Second Sonata consists of four movements:

1. Extrêmement rapide (extremely fast)
2. Lent (slow)
3. Modéré, presque vif (moderate, almost lively)
4. Vif (lively)

According to Boulez, the work can be seen as an effort to destroy traditional forms (he later declared that "history as it is made by great composers is not a history of conservation but of destruction – even while cherishing what is destroyed") and he stated that, following the work's completion, he never again composed in a way that referred to forms belonging to music of the past. He recalled that this was a reaction against the use of such forms in the music of the Viennese school; with regard to each of the four movements of the Second Sonata, he commented:

I tried to destroy the first-movement sonata form, to disintegrate slow movement form by the use of the trope, and repetitive scherzo form by the use of variation form, and finally, in the fourth movement, to demolish fugal and canonic form. Perhaps I am using too many negative terms, but the Second Sonata does have this explosive, disintegrating and dispersive character, and in spite of it own very restricting form the destruction of all these classical moulds was quite deliberate.

The first movement begins with the presentation of several clearly defined motifs, in what Dominique Jameux called "an outburst that seems to seize hold of the keyboard, changing its very nature, thrashing it in every direction and dominating it with a passionate intensity", setting the tone for the entire work. According to Charles Rosen, the movement features an exposition (with first and second themes), development, recapitulation, and coda; despite this, due to the dismantling, interlocking, and superimposition of the initial motivic material, the identity of that material is obscured, resulting in a texture in which rhythmic elaboration comes to the fore, and in which, as Griffiths put it, "one grasps at sporadic half-memories". Boulez commented: "The very strong, sharply-outlined thematic structures of the opening gradually dissolve in a development that is completely amorphous... until they gradually return". Writer Edward Campbell, however, questioned whether the recurrence of the motives is audible due to their dissolutive treatment.

The second, slow movement is based on the principle of the trope, with initial material that is both commented upon by interjections (these musical "parentheses" look forward to the Third Piano Sonata) and varied by a process in which it is embedded in successively more complex music. The third movement is the most backward-looking (Boulez referred to it as "one of the last vestiges of classicism that still meant anything to me as far as form was concerned") and consists of four "scherzo" sections alternating with three "trios". The fourth and final movement begins in a scattered way but soon settles into a low-register fugue-like statement. This gradually builds to a frenzied, loud climax, in which the performer is asked to "pulverize the sound", followed by a calm, slow, quiet coda.

Concerning serial technique, Boulez stated that, in the Second Sonata, he "broke with the 'concept' of the Schoenbergian note-row", and that what attracted him with regard to "the manipulation of the twelve notes... was the idea of giving them a functional significance". As was true in the First Piano Sonata, in the Second Sonata Boulez appears to treat a series as a collection of cells that are allowed to evolve independently in both the melodic and harmonic sense, rather than as a strictly ordered succession of pitches. At the same time, Boulez continued to expand his rhythmic vocabulary in ways that illustrate his debt to Messiaen, resulting in music in which a regular sense of meter is usually obscured.

The Second Sonata was first performed by Yvette Grimaud at a concert in Paris on 29 April, 1950, and was published by Heugel the same year. The United States premiere was arranged by John Cage, who had brought copies of the score with him when he returned from Paris in 1949. Cage originally intended for William Masselos to give the premiere, but after it was found that Masselos had not made any progress with the piece, Cage learned that David Tudor had begun working on it after Morton Feldman passed one of Cage's copies of the score on to him. Tudor went on to give the U.S. premiere on 17 December, 1950 at Carnegie Recital Hall in New York City, with Cage turning pages.

The publication of the Second Sonata thrust Boulez into the spotlight as a leader of the avant-garde music scene. A number of writers later compared the monumental profile of the work to Beethoven's Hammerklavier Sonata. The Sonata also had a dramatic impact on both Cage and Tudor. According to Tudor, Cage "had a profound change when he went to Europe and met Pierre Boulez" and "was very struck by the disorder and chaos of the music". Concerning the Sonata, Cage reported having been "stupefied by its activism" and reduced "to a nearly total absence of comprehension", and that while turning pages for Tudor, he experienced "an exaltation". Tudor initially struggled with the piece, finding it devoid of conventional hierarchies and modes of continuity. After reading Boulez's article titled "Proposals", Tudor began studying the writings of Antonin Artaud, especially The Theatre and Its Double. This led him to a breakthrough, what he later described as "a change in musical perception... a definite breaking point... the moment I became aware another kind of musical continuity was possible, and from then on I began to see all other music in those terms". He recalled:

I recall how my mind had to change in order to be able to do it... All of a sudden I saw that there was a different way of looking at musical continuity, having to deal with what Artaud called the affective athleticism. It has to do with the disciplines that an actor goes through. It was a real breakthrough for me, because my musical consciousness in the meantime changed completely... I had to put my mind in a state of non-continuity – not remembering – so that each moment is alive.

The U.S. premiere of the Sonata, and the events leading up to it, came to be seen as the initial link between Cage and Tudor, and the beginning of a relationship that would last until Cage's death.

== Third Piano Sonata ==
The Third Piano Sonata was first performed by the composer in Cologne and at the Darmstädter Ferienkurse in 1958, in a "preliminary version" of its five-movement form. A subsequent Darmstadt performance by the composer, on 30 August 1959 in the Kongresssaal Mathildenhöhe, was recorded and has been released commercially on CD2 of the seven-disc boxed set, Neos 11360, Darmstadt Aural Documents, Box 4: Pianists ([Germany]: Neos, 2016).

One motivating force for its composition was Boulez's desire to explore aleatoric music. He published several writings, both criticizing the practice and suggesting its reformation, leading up to the composition of this sonata in 1955–57/63. Other inspirations included the literary work of Stéphane Mallarmé and James Joyce. Boulez has published only two complete movements of this work (in 1963), and a fragment of another, the other movements having been written up to various stages of elaboration but not completed to the composer's satisfaction. Of the unpublished movements (or "formants", as Boulez calls them), the one titled "Antiphonie" is the most fully developed. It has been analysed by Pascal Decroupet. The formant titled "Strophe" is the one least developed since the preliminary form but:

a 1958 radio tape of the composer's Cologne performance of the Third Piano Sonata shows that the wealth of cross-reference introduced by the inclusion of the other three movements, even in their preliminary versions, contributes exponentially to the complex, multiform effect of the whole.

A facsimile of the manuscript of the preliminary version of the remaining formant, "Séquence", was published in 1977, but was subsequently continued to nearly twice its original length.

1. "Antiphonie" (partially published)
2. "Trope"
3. "Constellation" (partially published, only in its retrograde version, as "Constellation-Miroir")
4. "Strophe" (unpublished)
5. "Séquence" (unpublished, except for a facsimile of the preliminary-version manuscript)
