= Dieter Mahncke =

South African scholar (born 1941)

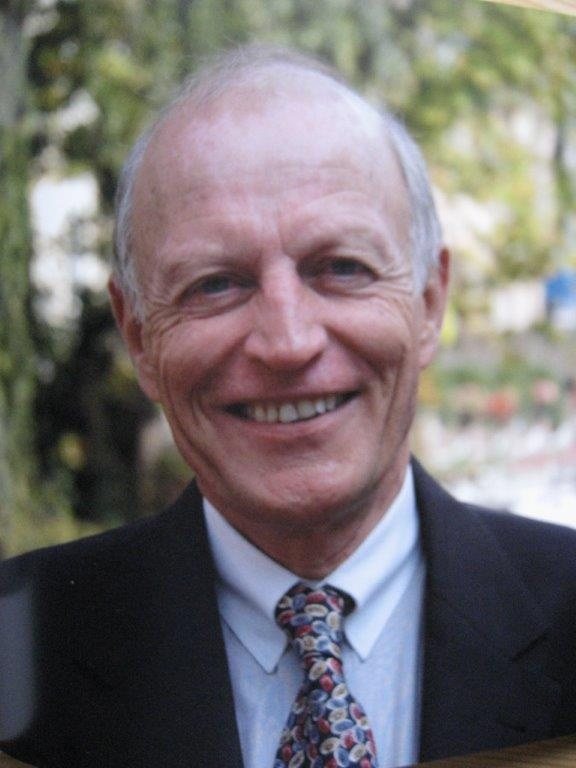
- Mahncke
- Born: 1941 (age 84–85); South-West Africa
- Occupation: Scholar

Dieter Mahncke (born 1941 in South-West Africa) is a scholar of foreign policy and security studies, and Alfried Krupp von Bohlen und Halbach Professor Emeritus of European Foreign Policy and Security Studies at the College of Europe. He is the author of books and articles on European security, arms control, German foreign policy, Berlin, US-European relations and South Africa.

== Education ==
Mahncke was born and raised in South-West Africa. After starting his studies at the University of Cape Town in South Africa, he transferred to the University of North Carolina at Chapel Hill, where he received a B.A. in political science (1962). He holds an M.A. and a PhD from the School of Advanced International Studies, Johns Hopkins University (1964, 1968), and a Habilitation from the Rheinische Friedrich-Wilhelms-Universität in Bonn (1974).

== Career ==
=== 1960 to 1990s ===
Mahncke was a Research Associate with the German Council on Foreign Relations (1968–1973), and Lecturer in Political Science at Mainz University (1969–1972) and Bonn University (1973–1974). He was professor of political science at the University of the German Federal Armed Forces (Universität der Bundeswehr) in Munich (1974) and Hamburg (1975–1980). He was Vice President of the University of the German Federal Armed Forces in Hamburg 1977–1978.

From 1979 to 1985 Mahncke was adviser to the German President and Deputy Chief of the Planning Staff in the Ministry of Defense until 1996. He was a visiting fellow at Brown University (1989) and a senior visiting fellow at the European Union Institute for Security Studies (1992).

=== 1990s to present ===
From 1996 to 2010 Mahncke was Alfried Krupp von Bohlen und Halbach Professor for European Foreign Policy and Security Studies at the College of Europe in Bruges. Before this Mahncke had been a visiting professor at the College of Europe since 1975, teaching both on the Bruges and Warsaw (since 1996) campus.

Mahncke has held visiting professorships in Germany (Halle), Belgium (Antwerp), Bulgaria (Sofia), Thailand (Bangkok) and the United States (Dartmouth, Middlebury, Duke, UNC). He also taught at the Moscow State Institute of International Relations (MGIMO). From 1995 to 2010 he was Member of the Board of the Harris German Distinguished Visiting Professorship at Dartmouth College.

== Distinctions ==
- Officer's Cross of the Order of Merit of the Federal Republic of Germany (2017)
- Honorary Professor of the College of Europe (2016)
- Knight's Cross of the Order of Merit of the Federal Republic of Germany (1984)
- Grand Officer of the Order of Orange-Nassau (1982)

== Publications ==
=== Books (selection) ===
- Nukleare Mitwirkung. Die Bundesrepublik Deutschland in der atlantischen Allianz 1954–1970. Walter de Gruyter, Berlin/New York 1972.
- Westeuropäische Verteidigungskooperation (hrsg. mit Karl Carstens). Mit einem Vorwort von Helmut Schmidt. Band 31 der Schriften des Forschungsinstituts der Deutschen Gesellschaft für Auswärtige Politik. Verlag R. Oldenbourg, München/Wien 1972.
- Berlin im geteilten Deutschland. Band 34 der Schriften des Forschungsinstituts der Deutschen Gesellschaft für Auswärtige Politik. Verlag R. Oldenbourg, München/Wien 1973.
- Seemacht und Außenpolitik (hrsg. mit Hans-Peter Schwarz). Mit einem Vorwort von Georg Leber. Band 11 der Reihe Rüstungsbeschränkung und Sicherheit" Alfred Metzner Verlag, Frankfurt/Main 1974.
- Vertrauensbildende Maßnahmen als Instrument der Sicherheitspolitik. Ursprung, Entwicklung, Perspektiven. Band 59 der Forschungsberichte der Konrad-Adenauer-Stiftung. Verlag Ernst Knoth, Melle 1987.
- Konflikt in Südafrika. Die politische Problematik Südafrikas in ihren innen- und außenpolitischen Dimensionen. Band 12 der Studien zur Politik. Schöningh-Verlag, Paderborn/München/Wien/Zürich 1989.
- Amerikaner in Deutschland. Grundlagen und Bedingungen der transatlantischen Sicherheit (Hrsg.). Mit einem Vorwort von Gerhard Stoltenberg. Bouvier Verlag, Bonn 1991.
- Parameters of European Security. Institute for Security Studies, Western European Union. Chaillot Papers 10, Paris, September 1993. (Französisch: Les Paramètres de la Sécurité Européenne.)
- Vertrauensbildende Maßnahmen und europäisches Sicherheitssystem: Von Stockholm 1986 bis Helsinki 1992. Konrad-Adenauer-Stiftung e.V., Bonn 1994.
- ASEAN and the EU in the International Environment (hrsg. mit Kullada Kesbonchoo-Mead, Prathoomporn Vajrasthira und Rudolf Hrbek). Asia-Europe Studies Series, Vol. 4, Nomos Verlagsgesellschaft, Baden-Baden 1999.
- The College of Europe: Fifty Years of Service to Europe (hrsg. mit L. Bekemans und R. Picht). Brügge 1999.
- Old Frontiers – New Frontiers. The Challenge of Kosovo and its Implications for the European Union (Ed.). Mit Vorwort von Javier Solana Madariaga. Peter Lang, Bern 2001. ISBN 978-3-906765-67-9.
- Redefining Transatlantic Security Relations: The Challenge of Change (mit Wayne Thompson und Wyn Rees). Manchester: Manchester University Press, 2004.
- European Foreign Policy (hrsg. mit Alicia Ambos & Christopher Reynolds), College of Europe Studies No. 1, Brüssel: P.I.E. Peter Lang, 2004. ISBN 90-5201-247-4.
- International Terrorism. A European Response to a Global Threat? (hrsg. mit Jörg Monar), College of Europe Studies No. 3, Brüssel: P.I.E. Peter Lang, 2006. ISBN 90-5201-046-3.
- Europe's Near Abroad. Promises and Prospects of the EU's Neighbourhood Policy (hrsg. mit Sieglinde Gstöhl), College of Europe Studies No. 4, Brüssel: P.I.E. Peter Lang, 2008. ISBN 978-90-5201-047-2.
- European Union Diplomacy. Coherence, Unity and Effectiveness. Mit Vorwort von Herman Van Rompuy (hrsg. mit Sieglinde Gstöhl), College of Europe Studies No. 15, Brüssel: P.I.E. Peter Lang 2012. ISBN 978-90-5201-842-3.

=== Articles (selection) ===
- South West Africa 1904–1907. in: D. Condit and B. Cooper (eds.), Challenge and Response in Internal Conflict, Vol. III: The Experience in Africa and Latin America, Washington D.C. 1968, S. 83–103.
- Was ist Friedensforschung? in: Europa-Archiv 22/1969, S. 795–802.
- Atlantische Allianz und europäische Sicherheit. in: Schweizer Monatshefte, April 1970, S. 2–35.
- Der politische Umbruch in der Bundesrepublik Deutschland: Von der Großen Koalition zur SPD/FDP-Regierung. in: Die internationale Politik 1968/1969, Jahrbuch des Forschungsinstituts der Deutschen Gesellschaft für Auswärtige Politik, München/Wien 1974, S. 374–390.
- Europe and the United States. in: Common Ground, Juli 1976, S. 53–61.
- Abschluss der Neuordnung der Beziehungen zwischen der Bundesrepublik Deutschland und Osteuropa. in: Die internationale Politik 1973/1974, Jahrbuch der Deutschen Gesellschaft für Auswärtige Politik, München/Wien 1980, S. 193–216.
- Die Beteiligung der Öffentlichkeit an der Außenpolitik im internationalen Vergleich. Stärken und Schwächen der demokratischen Staaten. in: Österreichische Zeitschrift für Außenpolitik 2/1982, S. 94–103.
- Maritime Interessen und die atlantische Option der deutschen Politik nach 1945. in: Die deutsche Flotte im Spannungsfeld der Politik 1848–1985, hrsg. vom Militärgeschichtlichen Forschungsamt, Freiburg/Br. 1985, S. 153–184.
- Verteidigung in Europa: Was spricht für eine europäische Sicherheitspolitik? in: Politische Studien, Juli/August 1986, S. 423–433.
- Alternativen zur nuklearen Abschreckung als Grundlage europäischer Sicherheit? in: Aus Politik und Zeitgeschichte, Beilage zu Das Parlament, 25. Oktober 1986, S. 3–13.
- Alternatives to Nuclear Defense in Europe: Are we Talking about the Right Issue? in: P. Terrence Hopmann and Frank Barnaby (eds.), Rethinking the Nuclear Weapons Dilemma in Europe, London 1988, S. 183–204.
- Die Legitimation bewaffneter Friedenssicherung. in: Ulrich Sarcinelli (Hrsg.), Demokratische Streitkultur. Theoretische Grundpositionen und Handlungsalternativen in Politikfeldern, Opladen 1990, S. 197–217.
- Hoffnung ohne Garantie? Diskussion mit Elmar Schmähling. in: Die Neue Gesellschaft/Frankfurter Hefte 2/1990, S. 150–156.
- Südafrikas Außenpolitik: Gibt es einen Weg aus der Isolation? in: Aus Politik und Zeitgeschichte, Beilage zu Das Parlament, Dezember 1990, S. 1–9.
- Reunification as an Issue in German Politics 1949–1990. in: Dieter Grosser (ed.), German Unification. The Unexpected Challenge, Oxford 1992, S. 33–54.
- Wandel im Wandel: Bundeswehr und europäische Sicherheit. in: Aus Politik und Zeitgeschichte, Beilage zu Das Parlament, April 1993, S. 40–46.
- Innerdeutsche Beziehungen und internationale Rahmenbedingungen: Die Berlin-Krise 1958–1961/62. Gutachten für die Enquete-Kommission des Deutschen Bundestages zur Geschichte und Folgen der SED-Diktatur, Bonn/Berlin, Oktober 1993 (107 Seiten), veröffentlicht in: Deutscher Bundestag (Hrsg.), Materialien der Enquete-Kommission, Aufarbeitung von Geschichte und Folgen der SED-Diktatur in Deutschland, Band V, S. 1766–1821, ferner S. 17–27, 66–71.
- The Role of the USA in Europe: Successful Past but Uncertain Future? (1999)
- Eine gemeinsame Europäische Außen- und Sicherheitspolitik: Auswirkungen auf die transatlantischen Beziehungen. in: Hanspeter Neuhold (Hrsg.), Die GASP: Entwicklungen und Perspektiven, Occasional Papers (4/2000) der Diplomatischen Akademie Wien, S. 36–44.
- Russia's Attitude to the European Security and Defence Policy. in: European Foreign Affairs Review, Vol. 6, No. 4, Kluwer Law International, Winter 2001, S. 427–436.
- Transatlantic Relations: Fractured or Simply Strained? in: Favorita Papers 02/2003, Diplomatische Akademie Wien, S. 30–43.
- A New World Order?, in: August Reinisch / Ursula Kriebaum (eds.), The Law of International Relations – Liber Amicorum Hanspeter Neuhold, Eleven International Publishing, Utrecht, January 2007, pp. 211–227.
- The United States, Germany and France: Balancing Transatlantic Relations. in: The British Journal of Politics & International Relations, 1/11 (Februar 2009), S. 79–93.
- A Post-modern Diplomacy: Can EU Foreign Policy Make a Difference in World Politics? Bruges, EU Diplomacy Paper 04/2011.
- What's wrong with the European Union? And what can be done? Bruges Political Research Papers/Cahiers de recherche politique de Bruges 54/2016.

Academic offices
Preceded by	Alfried Krupp von Bohlen und Halbach Professor for European Foreign Policy and Security Studies at the College of Europe; 1996–	Succeeded by
