= Paul Demaret =

University professor and former rector of the College of Europe

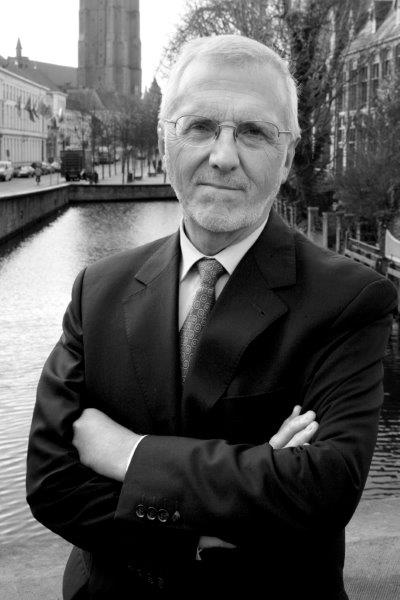
Paul Demaret

Paul Demaret (Ostend, 24 September 1941) is a university professor and former rector of the College of Europe, located in Bruges (Belgium) and Natolin (Poland).

== Biography ==
Demaret holds a PhD in law from the University of Liège, an LL.M. from Columbia Law School and a JSD from UC Berkeley. He defended his doctorate of law at the University of Liège.

He was Professor of Law (ordinary until 2003, extraordinary 2003–2006) at the University of Liège, where he held the Jean Monnet Chair in European Economic Law, and was the Director of the Institut d'Etudes Juridiques Européennes Fernand Dehousse.

At the College of Europe he was Director of Legal Studies from 1981 until 2003. He became rector in 2003, succeeding to Robert Picht.

He was a Robert Schuman Professor at Peking University Law School (EU-China Higher Education cooperation programme) in 1999 and he served on two WTO panels.

His teaching subjects included:

- European economic law
- Comparative economic law EU-US
- the external dimension of the EU internal market.

From November 2008 until June 2009, Demaret served as member of a six-member panel of EU experts advising the Bulgarian government. Set up by Bulgaria's Prime Minister Sergei Stanishev, the advisory board was chaired by Dominique de Villepin and mandated to recommend ways to help the country adjust to EU membership.

== Publications ==
- Mondialisation et accès aux marchés. L'accès au marché des services réglementés: la libéralisation du commerce des services dans le cadre du traité CE, in: Revue internationale de droit économique 2002/2-3 (t. XVI)

His publications are mainly in the fields of

- European Community law (European intellectual property law, European competition law, free movement of goods, Free movement of persons, Common commercial policy)
- International Trade Law (Regional Integration Agreements/GATT/WTO). In 1999, he was awarded a Robert Schuman professorship at Peking University (). He served on two WTO panels.

Preceded by Robert Picht (rector ad interim)	Rector of the College of Europe; 2003-	Succeeded by Jörg Monar
