= Yvette Grimaud =

French composer, pianist, ethnomusicologist (1920–2012)

Yvette Jeanne Grimaud (29 January 1920 – 19 February 2012) was a French pianist, composer and ethnomusicologist.

Born in Algeria, she moved to Paris in the 1940s, where she was a student of Olivier Messiaen and gave the first performances of early works for piano by Pierre Boulez. She later gave up her career as a pianist to focus on ethnomusicology, specialising in the traditional music of Georgia.
