= Le Visage nuptial =

Cantata by Pierre Boulez

- Cantata by Pierre Boulez
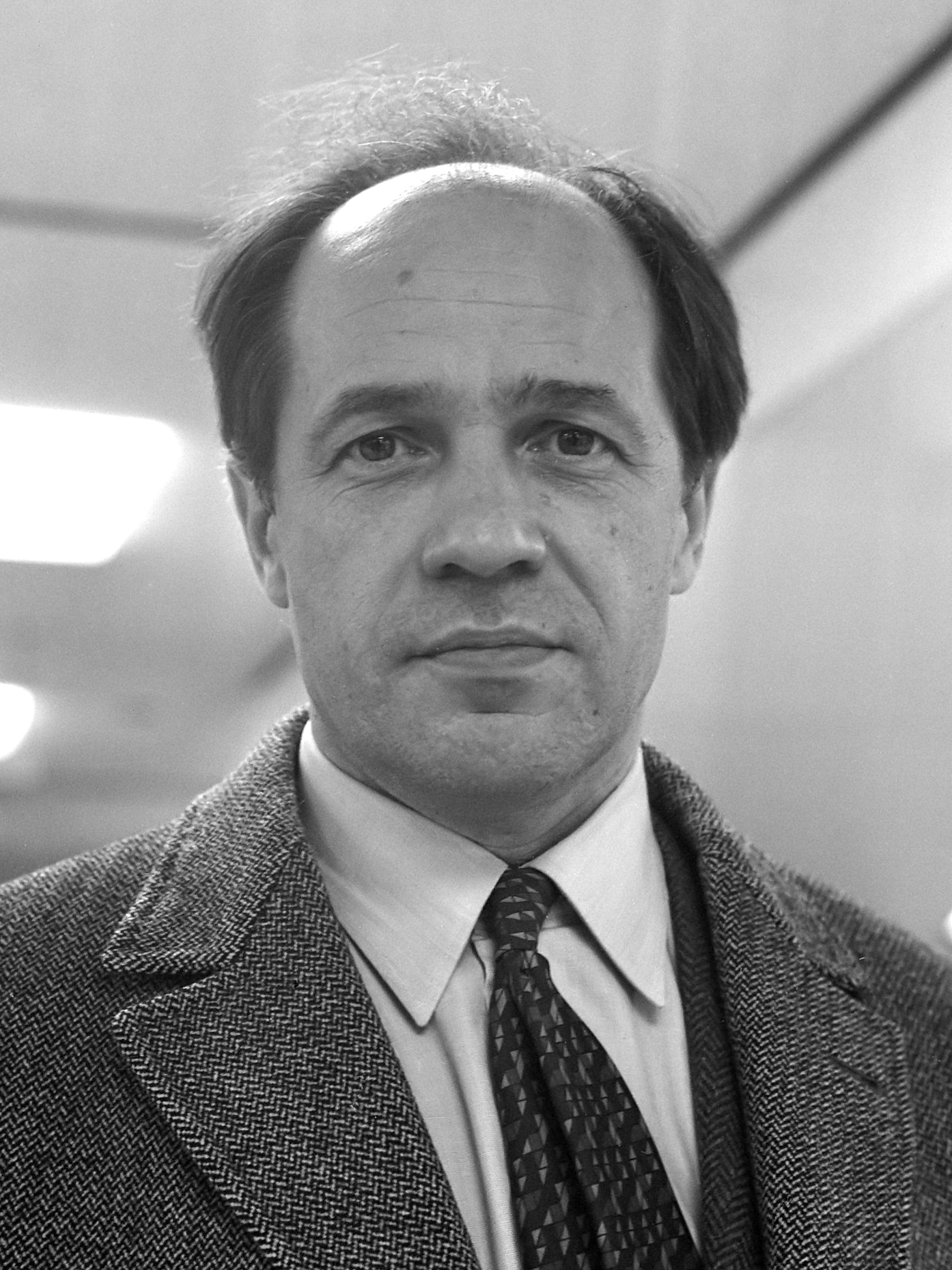
- Boulez in 1968
- English: The Nuptial Face
- Text: poem by René Char
- Language: French
- Composed: 1946–47, revised 1951 and 1989
- Performed: 4 December 1957: Cologne
- Scoring: soprano; contralto; women's choir; orchestra

Le Visage nuptial (The Nuptial Face) is a secular cantata for soprano, contralto, choir of women and orchestra by Pierre Boulez. Originally composed in 1946–47 on a poem by René Char for two voices, two ondes Martenot, piano and percussion, the work, revised in 1951–52 in a version for voices and orchestra, was premiered on 4 December 1957 in Cologne conducted by the composer. The score was further revised in 1989, removing the quarter tones present in the second and fifth parts of the 1951–52 version, while revising the orchestration. A version with final revisions by the composer was premiered on 25 February 2014 at the Cité de la Musique in Paris during the closing concert of the festival Présences of Radio France.

== Instrumentation ==
The piece is scored for soprano solo, alto solo, women's choir, and an orchestra consisting of nine percussionists:

Woodwinds
4 flutes (3rd doubling piccolo, 4th doubling on G flute)
3 oboes
English horn
3 clarinets (1st and 2nd in B♭ and A, 3rd in E♭ and A)
bass clarinet in B♭
4 bassoons (4th doubling contrabassoon)
Brass
4 horns
4 trumpets in C
3 trombones (3rd doubling bass trombone)
Tuba

Percussion
timbales
9 players (see below)
Keyboards
celesta
Strings
2 harps
16 violins I
14 violins II
12 violas
10 cellos
8 double basses

The nine percussion parts are as follows:

Percussion 1
xylophone, sounding an octave higher
glockenspiel, sounding two octaves higher
Japanese wood blocks
pair of crotales, sounding an E_{5}
Percussion 2
marimba
2 claves (medium and high)
Turkish cymbal, suspended (medium)
pair of crotales, sounding a B♭_{4}
Percussion 3
vibraphone
Percussion 4
set of cowbells, ranged G_{3} to A♭_{5}
3 tom-toms
2 Turkish cymbals, suspended (medium, medium-high, and low)
Chinese cymbal, suspended
Sizzle cymbal, suspended
claves (low)
2 maracas (medium)
pair of crotales, sounding a B_{5}
Percussion 5
set of steel drums, ranged G_{3} to B♭_{5}
2 maracas
güiro
2 Japanese wood blocks
slit wood drum
bass drum
triangle
gong (medium-low)
tam-tam (large)
pair of crotales, sounding an A_{4}

Percussion 6
glockenspiel
4 metal blocks
claves
whip
güiro
2 maracas
Turkish cymbal, suspended
2 gongs, sounding B♭_{3} and C_{4}
tam-tam (large, same as Percussion 5)
pair of crotales, sounding a D_{5}
Percussion 7
set of crotales (2 octaves)
crotale, sounding an E♭_{4}
2 frame drums
3 Japanese wood blocks
güiro
whip
gong (medium)
2 tam-tams (medium and large)
Percussion 8
tubular bells (2 octaves)
snare drum (without snare)
2 conga drums
claves
güiro
large triangle
2 anvils, medium and large
2 gongs, high
tam-tam, medium
pair of crotales, sounding an F_{5}
Percussion 9
4 bongo drums
2 maracas
2 Turkish cymbals, suspended (high, low)
large sizzle cymbal
2 bell plates, sounding B♭_{3} and C_{4}
pair of crotales, sounding a C♯_{5}

== Structure ==
1. Conduite: Orchestre traité à la manière d'un orchestre de chambre sans les voix.
  Conduct: Orchestra treated like a chamber orchestra without voices.
2. Gravité: Mouvement lent qui chante l'attente amoureuse en utilisant les micro-intervalles.
  Severity: Slow movement singing the amorous expectation using micro-intervals.
3. Le Visage nuptial: Apothéose de la relation amoureuse.
  The Nuptial Face: Apotheosis of the love relationship.
4. Evadné: Dialectique entre voix intérieures et orchestre du monde extérieur.
  Evadne: Dialectic between inner voices and orchestra of the outside world.
5. Post-scriptum: Rupture du couple, et retour à la solitude avec un orchestre sans les vents.
  Postscript: Breaking of the couple, and returning to solitude with an orchestra without winds.

The performance's duration is twenty minutes.
