= Schulthess =

Schulthess is a surname. Notable people with the surname include:

- Anna Pestalozzi-Schulthess (1738–1815), Swiss educator and philanthropist
- Barbara Schulthess (1745–1818), Swiss Salonnière
- Edmund Schulthess (1868–1944), Swiss politician
- Walter Schulthess (1894–1971), Swiss conductor and composer
- Wilhelm Schulthess (1855–1917), Swiss internist and pediatrician
