= Incises =

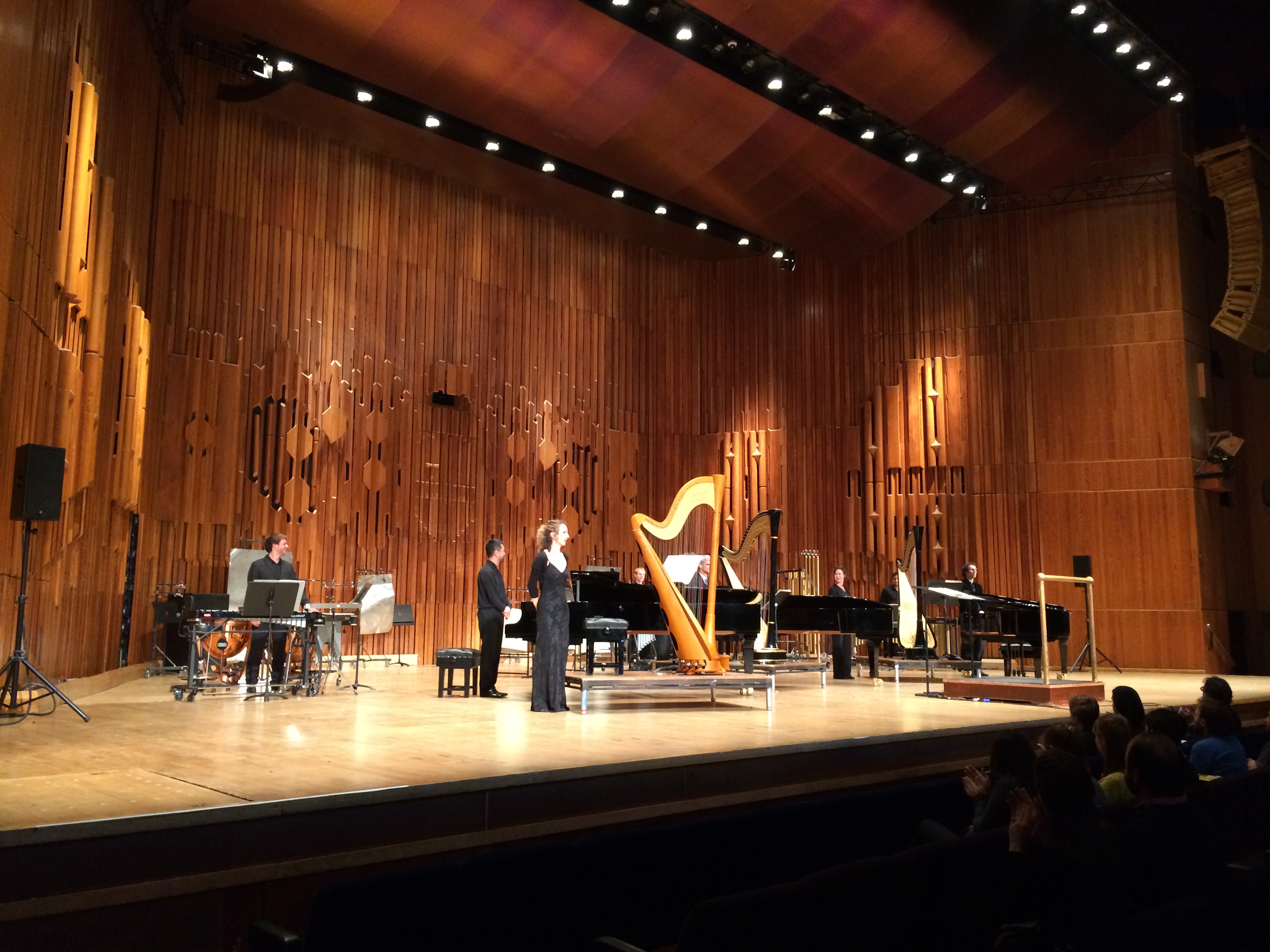
The Ensemble InterContemporain after a performance of Sur Incises in Barbican Hall, London, April 2015

Incises (1994/2001) and Sur Incises (1996/1998) are two related works of the French composer Pierre Boulez. The pitches of the row used in Incises and Sur Incises are based on the Sacher hexachord, the same as those used in the rows for Répons, Messagesquisse, and Dérive 1.

== Incises ==
Incises ("Interpolations") for solo piano was composed in 1994 as a test piece for the Umberto Micheli Piano Competition, where it was first performed on 21 October 1994. Boulez revised it in 2001. Incises was Boulez's first work for solo piano since his Third Piano Sonata of 1955–57/63. The piece lasts less than ten minutes.

The work plays with contrasts of gestures and textures, for instance, repeated pitches or chords in an even tempo interrupted by violent melodic arcs, or sparse chordal interjections without discernible rhythm over long held sonorities.

Reviewing a 2005 performance of Incises, Tim Page described the work thus: "Incises is charged with a bright, cold, hard brilliance, like a spray of crushed ice. It is dense with events – even when it is silent for a moment, Boulez's music never really 'rests' – but also far more generous in its emotional expression than much of his earlier work."

== Sur Incises ==
Boulez wrote Sur Incises a few years later and dedicated it to Paul Sacher on his 90th birthday. It was premiered on 30 August 1998 by the Ensemble InterContemporain conducted by David Robertson in Edinburgh's Usher Hall. The piece lasts about forty minutes. It was awarded the Grawemeyer Award for Music Composition given by the University of Louisville.

Based on the material of Incises, Sur Incises is a two-movement work (the movements are called "Moment I" and "Moment II") for three pianos, three harps, and three percussion parts, which use a variety of tuned percussion instruments: vibraphone, marimba, glockenspiel, steel drums, tubular bells, and crotales. Here the sounds of the piano in Incises are broken into component parts played by the harps and percussion, and they are deployed across space by spreading the three groups apart in the performance area. This kind of reworking of an earlier piece is characteristic of Boulez, the first instance being Structures.

Anthony Tommasini described a 1999 performance of Sur Incises:

The sheer riot of color is engrossing. As the music unfolds, episodes of sustained, quasi-lyrical dreaminess alternate abruptly with outbursts of pulsating intensity that suggest "organized delirium", in the term Mr. Boulez has used to describe an effect he is after in his works. When the performance ended ... the audience erupted with its own brand of organized delirium. Perhaps after a couple of decades of neo-Romantic works by composers craving appreciation, the audience found it bracing to hear Mr. Boulez's wildly colorful, almost crazed and uncompromisingly difficult music.

Paul Griffiths heard echoes of Debussy's L'isle joyeuse in Sur Incises, while others have noted its debt to Stravinsky's Les Noces or Bartok's Sonata for Two Pianos and Percussion. Griffiths described the work:

[Boulez's] choice of like but distinct instruments, with the percussionists playing vibraphones and marimba most of the time and the ensemble well spread out, allows him to use his astonishing ear to recreate effects of harmonic, timbral and spatial echo for which in earlier works he had needed electronic means. The command of musical energy and the sense of drama are also spectacular. At least the first two of the high-speed chases are thrilling, and there are marvelous moments when steel drums come in with their exotic disintonations, or when the harps fall silent for an ominous summons of pianos and bells.

Tom Service wrote in The Guardian that:

[t]he piece is a narration about sound, about the interplay and transformation of the timbres of the pianos, the harps, and the percussion instruments, into one gigantic super-instrument of infinite resonance and reflection. The drama of the music is how Boulez manipulates his musical textures to create moments of stasis and irresistible energy, and everything in between.

Service described a 2008 performance: "There's a polish and a voluptuousness about this music that's instantly appealing and gripping for the whole experience of the piece. A packed Festival Hall gave Boulez a rock-star reception after the music's coda."

Of the two works, Allan Kozinn preferred Incises, writing: "that work's Romanticism becomes portentousness in the update, and its sheer virtuosity have given way to abstraction and clockwork precision."
