= Juliane Banse =

German soprano

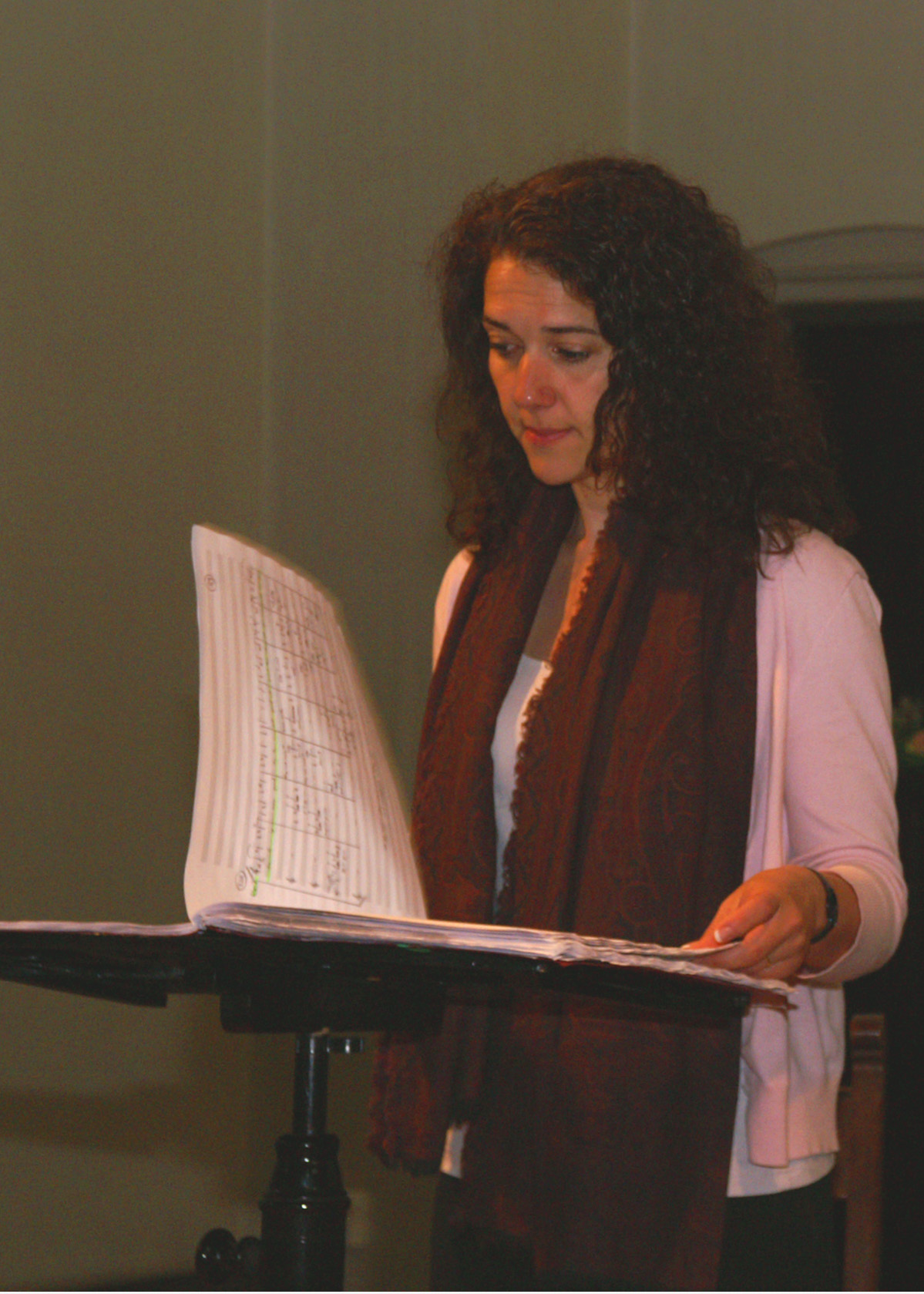
Juliane Banse

Juliane Banse (born 10 July 1969 in Tettnang, West Germany) is a German opera soprano and noted Lieder singer.

Banse received her vocal training at the Zürich Opera, and with Brigitte Fassbaender in Munich. She won first prize in the singing competition of the Kulturforum in Munich in 1989. She made her operatic debut that year as Pamina in Mozart's The Magic Flute at the Komische Oper Berlin. In 1993, the International Franz Schubert Institute, whose jury that year included Elisabeth Schwarzkopf and Dietrich Fischer-Dieskau, awarded her first prize in the International Franz Schubert Competition.

Banse created the role of Schneewittchen in Heinz Holliger's 1998 opera Schneewittchen at the Zürich Opera House. In 2005, she gave the world premiere of J.S. Bach's recently discovered aria, "Alles mit Gott und nichts ohn' ihn, BWV 1127", with András Schiff and Quatuor Mosaïques. She made her debut at the Metropolitan Opera in New York in 2014 as Zdenka in Richard Strauss' Arabella when she was called to replace the indisposed Genia Kühmeier. In the 2014–2015 season, she sang the role of Fiordiligi in Mozart's Così fan tutte in Barcelona's Gran Teatre del Liceu.

She has been a professor of singing at the Robert Schumann Hochschule since the 2016/17 winter semester.

== Awards ==
- 2003 Robert Schumann Prize of the City of Zwickau
- 2025 Hindemith Prize of the City of Hanau

== Discography ==
- Brahms, Johannes; Banse, Juliane; Genz, Stephan; Beringer, Karl-Friedrich; Windsbacher Knabenchor; Deutsches Symphonie-Orchester Berlin (2002). Ein deutsches Requiem nach Worten der Heiligen Schrift für Soli, Chor und Orchester opus 45 (in undetermined language). Windsbach: Rondeau Musikproduktion und -vertrieb. OCLC 1433122189.
- Berg, Alban; Altenberg, Peter; Wedekind, Frank; Banse, Juliane; Abbado, Claudio; Wiener Philharmoniker (1996), Altenberg-Lieder op. 4 Drei Stücke aus der "Lyrischen Suite" : Fassung für Streichorchester; "Lulu"-Suite (in German), Hamburg: Deutsche Grammophon, OCLC 856962885
- Beethoven, Ludwig van; Rattle, Simon; Bonney, Barbara; Remmert, Birgit; Streit, Kurt; Hampson, Thomas; Vogt, Lars; Denoke, Angela; Villars, Jon; Held, Alan; Polgár, László; Banse, Juliane; Trost, Rainer; Quasthoff, Thomas; Ebenstein, Thomas; Tibrea, Ion; Wiener Philharmoniker; City of Birmingham Symphony Orchestra Chorus; City of Birmingham Symphony Orchestra; Arnold-Schönberg-Chor; Berliner Philharmoniker (2010), Complete symphonies; Piano concertos 1 & 2; Fidelio (in German), [England?]: EMI Classics, OCLC 891324762
- Bach, Johann Sebastian; Banse, Juliane; Danz, Ingeborg; Schade, Michael; Taylor, James; Goerne, Matthias; Schmidt, Andreas; Rilling, Helmuth; Gächinger Kantorei Stuttgart; Bach-Collegium Stuttgart (1997), Johannes-Passion BWV 245 (in German), Neuhausen (Filder): Hänssler, OCLC 1183633930
- Brahms, Johannes; Banse, Juliane; Vermillion, Iris; Schmidt, Andreas; Deutsch, Helmut (2012), Lieder 10 (in German), Georgsmarienhütte: Cpo-Musikproduktion, OCLC 1184485050
- Reimann, Aribert; Brahms, Johannes; Schumann, Robert; Schubert, Franz; Mendelssohn Bartholdy, Felix; Banse, Juliane; Cherubini-Quartett (1998), Song cycles after Schubert, Schumann, Brahms & Mendelssohn (in undetermined language), Zürich: Tudor Recording, OCLC 163137013
- Boulez, Pierre; Banse, Juliane; Otter, Anne Sofie von; Wellbaum, Lisa; Hagley, Alison; Aimard, Pierre-Laurent; Debussy, Claude; Mahler, Gustav; Messiaen, Olivier; Ravel, Maurice; Stravinsky, Igor; Cleveland Orchestra (2017), Boulez : the Cleveland Orchestra, Berlin: Deutsche Grammophon, OCLC 1192473472
