= Sacher hexachord =

Musical motif forming Paul Sacher's name

Component intervals from root
- perfect fifth
- perfect fourth
- major third
- major second
- minor second
- root

Forte no. / Complement
- 6-Z11 / 6-Z40

Interval vector
- <3,3,3,2,3,1>

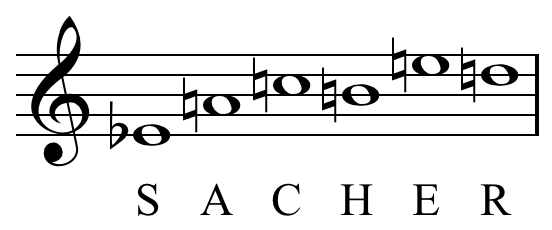
Sacher hexachord: E♭ (Es) A C B (H) E D (Re)

The Sacher hexachord (6-Z11, a musical cryptogram on the name of Swiss conductor Paul Sacher) is a hexachord notable for its use in a set of twelve compositions (12 Hommages à Paul Sacher) created at the invitation of Mstislav Rostropovich for Sacher's seventieth birthday in 1976.

The twelve compositions include Pierre Boulez's Messagesquisse, Benjamin Britten's Tema "Sacher", Hans Werner Henze's Capriccio, Witold Lutosławski's Sacher Variation, and Henri Dutilleux's Trois strophes sur le nom de Sacher. Further, Boulez's Répons, Dérive 1, Incises and Sur Incises all use tone rows with the same pitches.

The hexachord's complement is its Z-relation, 6-Z40.

== See also ==
- Schoenberg hexachord
