= Messagesquisse =

1976 composition by Pierre Boulez

- by Pierre Boulez
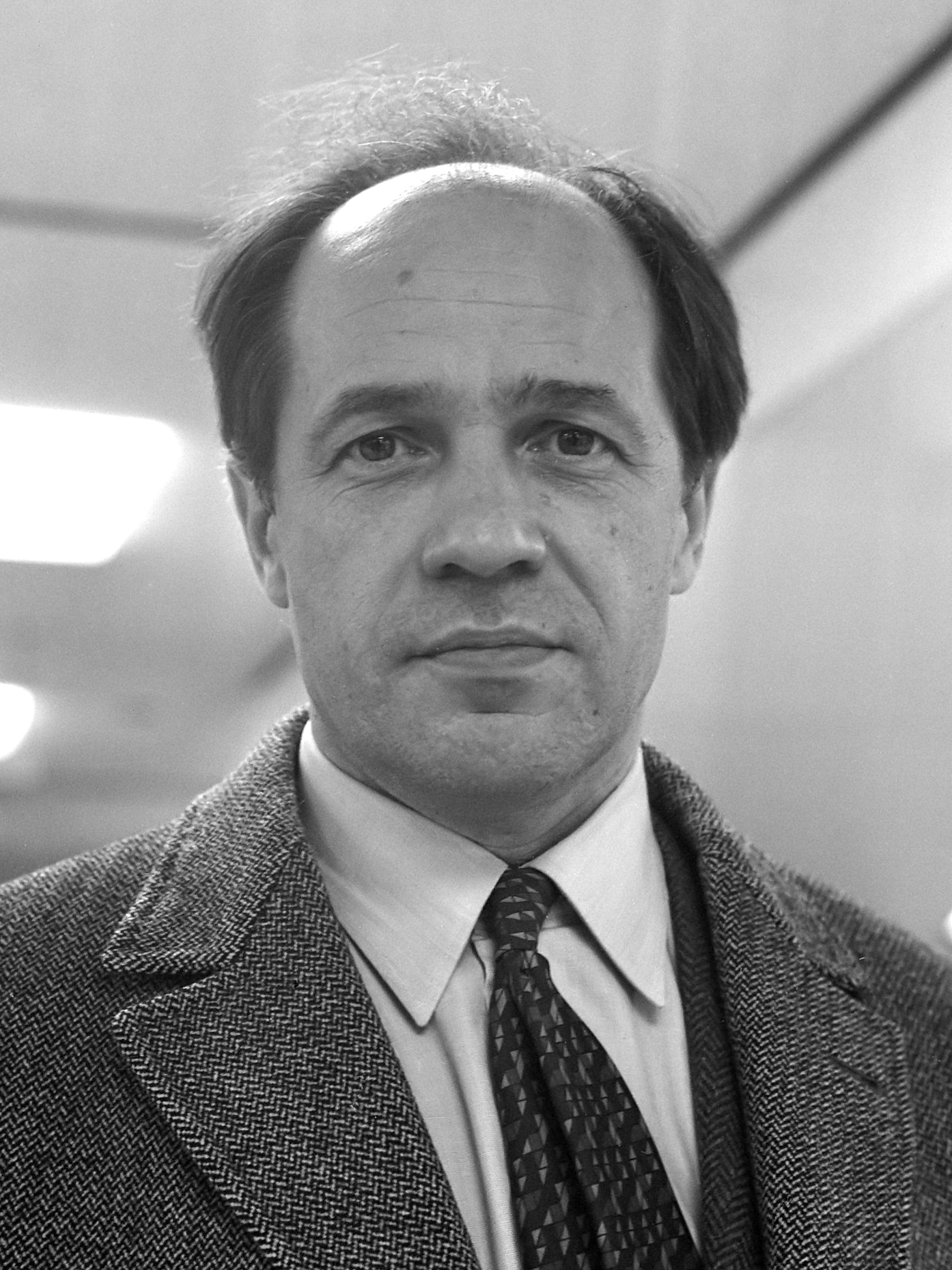
- Boulez in 1968
- Composed: 1976
- Performed: 3 July 1977
- Published: 1976
- Movements: 1
- Scoring: solo cello and six cellos

Messagesquisse (Message-Sketch) is a 1976 composition for solo cello and six cellos by Pierre Boulez.

== Background ==
In 1976, cellist Mstislav Rostropovich commissioned twelve composers (Conrad Beck, Luciano Berio, Boulez, Benjamin Britten, Henri Dutilleux, Wolfgang Fortner, Alberto Ginastera, Cristóbal Halffter, Hans Werner Henze, Heinz Holliger, Klaus Huber and Witold Lutosławski) to write pieces celebrating the 70th birthday of conductor and patron Paul Sacher. The composers were asked to base their works on the Sacher hexachord, in which Sacher's last name is spelled out as musical notes: eS-A-C-H-E-Re is translated into E♭-A-C-B-E-D (Es is E♭ in German; H is B♮ in German; Re is D♮ in French). These compositions were collected under the title 12 Hommages à Paul Sacher, and published together in the book Dank an Paul Sacher (Thanks to Paul Sacher). The complete cycle was not performed in its entirety until 9 May 2011, at a concert by cellist František Brikcius at the Convent of Saint Agnes, part of the National Gallery Prague, Czech Republic.

Boulez's contribution to the tribute, Messagesquisse, is dedicated to Sacher "with deep and faithful affection," and is a single-movement work scored for solo cello accompanied by an ensemble of six cellos, with a duration of roughly seven minutes. Its title is a portmanteau word that combines "messages" and "esquisse" ("sketch" in English). The work's pitch material is based on rotations of the Sacher hexachord, while its rhythms are derived from the letters of Sacher's last name represented in Morse code. Boulez biographer Dominique Jameux noted the work's "clearly perceptible design," while musicologist Susan Bradshaw described it as "a birthday telegram written in an easily decipherable musical code that relates everything to the single cell of an initiating series drawn from the letters of its dedicatee's name."

Boulez would go on to base a series of compositions on the Sacher hexachord: Répons (1980, revised and expanded 1982 and 1984); Dérive 1 (1984); Incises (1994, revised and expanded 2001); and Sur Incises (1996–98).

== Premiere and publication ==
Messagesquisse was premiered on 3 July 1977 in La Rochelle, France, with soloist Pierre Penassou and conductor Michel Tabachnik. It was published by Universal Edition.

== Alternate versions ==
In 2000, Boulez prepared a version of Messagesquisse for solo viola and six violas; it was premiered on 25 June 2000 in Aix-en-Provence, France, with soloist Christophe Desjardins accompanied by conservatory students, and is published by Universal Edition. An additional version for solo viola and tape was prepared in 2016; it was premiered on 23 January 2021 at a concert in Paris, France, with soloist Adrien La Marca.

The 2006 album Deutsche Grammophon ReComposed by Jimi Tenor, produced by Finnish musician Jimi Tenor, features "a truly genre-bending version" of Messagesquisse that "finds an improbable common ground between such remote points as the hyperactive runs of Boulez's cello part, the burbling electronics of acid house, and bluegrass fiddle music."

== Reception ==
Reviewing a 1999 performance at Carnegie Hall, Bernard Holland called Messagesquisse "a charmer, exploiting the sound of a single instrument multiplied seven times and doing it with great delicacy." He also acknowledged the fact that the audience "loved this piece." Regarding a 2016 performance at New York's 92nd Street Y, Anthony Tommasini described the work as "music of wondrous precision and vibrant color."

Musicologist Arnold Whittall suggested that Messagesquisse can be heard as "a textbook demonstration to silence all those would-be analysts who plague him for information about 'how it is done'," and wrote: "Anyone who cannot bear the thought that Boulez not only has a sense of humour but is capable of such a lightweight birthday card as Messagesquisse had better avert his eyes."

== See also ==
- Tema "Sacher"
