= Divertimento for String Orchestra (Bartók) =

Composition by Béla Bartók

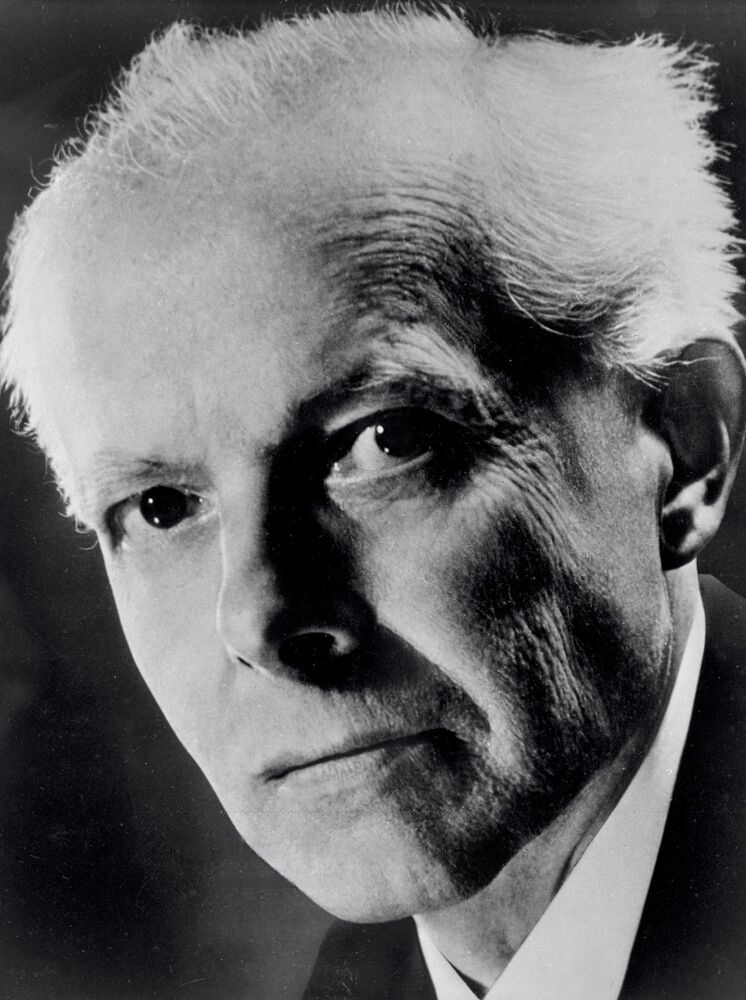
Béla Bartók in 1943

Divertimento for String Orchestra, Sz.113 BB.118 is a three-movement work composed by Béla Bartók in 1939, scored for full orchestral strings. Paul Sacher, a Swiss conductor, patron, impresario, and the founder of the chamber orchestra Basler Kammerorchester, commissioned Bartók to compose the Divertimento, which is now known to be the pair's last collaborative work.

== Divertimento ==
The term "Divertimento" (Italian for "diversion") denotes a work primarily designed for the entertainment of both the listeners and the performers. The divertimento was popularized in the Classical period by Haydn, Boccherini, and Mozart. This is a neo-classical work constructed around modal tonalities, but it cannot simply be defined as a modernist work or a strictly neoclassical work.

One of the most evident neoclassical characteristics is the treatment of texture. Frequently, a small group of soloists contrasts the whole orchestra, greatly varying the work's texture. This is reminiscent of the Baroque genre of the Concerto Grosso, where a small group of soloists, the concertino, was contrasted and accompanied by the tutti orchestra, or the ripieno. While baroque tonality comes within reach, the work is for the most part tonally modernistic. Dynamically, the work features sharp contrasts. The work also utilizes the fugal elements of imitation, fugato, and contains a three voice fugue.

== Music ==
Bartók's Divertimento is scored for string orchestra: violins I and II, viola, cello, and double bass, all of which contain divisi sections. Unlike the majority of orchestral scores, the minimum number of players in each string section is specified: six violins I, six violins II, four violas, four cellos, and two double basses.

The work has three movements:

1. Allegro non troppo
2. Molto adagio
3. Allegro assai

=== I. Allegro non troppo ===
Typically 8 minutes long, the opening movement is presented as a waltz with specific 'gypsy' influences evident melodically, through the use of various modes and non-traditional scales, and rhythmically, through the use of irregularly placed accents and extended syncopated rhythms. Metrically, the movement is set in shifting, regular compound meters that at times evoke both a clear or equally murky beat placement. The movement is presented in standard Sonata form in conjunction with Bartók's attempt at a neoclassical work. Bartók's homage to the Baroque period is clear in his treatment of orchestration in this movement. There is a clear contrast of textures between a small group of soloists and the tutti orchestra, reminiscent of the Baroque concerto grosso. The melodic material presented by the group of soloists is commonly imitative fugato. Bartók's harmonic language throughout the movement is typically very chromatic and contains modal inflections. There are several spots within the movement where harmony seems to imitate common Baroque harmony, explicit evidence supporting the work's neoclassicism.

=== II. Molto adagio ===
The 8-minute-long second movement is very slow and dark music. The movement is presented in ternary form, another neoclassical influence. Harmonically and melodically, it is less traditional and less oriented to the neoclassical style than the previous movement, at times, stretching tonality to the brink of atonality. The movement's three themes are imitated, frequently while another voice has yet to complete its melodic phrase. This technique creates a dissonant, foreboding sound that is furthered by sharp dynamic contrasts. Bartók requests some extended techniques in this movement, writing many double stops and several instances of harmonics. The texture is once again varied by contrasts of soloists with the full orchestra, although to a lesser extent than in the previous movement.

=== III. Allegro assai ===
The 6-minute finale is quick, dance-like and in rondo form. Harmonically, this movement is more clearly modal and less dissonant than the previous movement. This movement is full of imitation both as single solo voices and as a full ensemble. Variation of texture is again achieved by the contrast of solo voices and full orchestra. Within the movement is a full three-voice fugue that culminates in a recitative-like solo cadenza for violin. This solo evokes a gypsy quality through its rhythmic, harmonic and stylistic inflections. The piece closes with a fast section reminiscent of Bartók's later string quartets.

== Background and World War II ==
The Divertimento for String Orchestra is Bartók's last work composed just before he fled Hungary and emigrated to the United States during the outbreak of World War II. Due to Bartók's disdain for the Nazi regime and Hungary's unpopular political stance, Bartók discontinued his concert performing and terminated his publishing contract in Germany. In 1938, Bartók began slowly sending away his most treasured manuscripts and in 1940, Bartók and his wife, Ditta Pásztory, relocated to New York City. That same year, Hungary joined the Axis alliance and on July 1, 1941 entered the war alongside Germany.

== Bartók’s patron ==
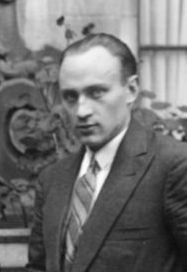
Bartók’s patron, Paul Sacher, in 1930

Paul Sacher is often noted as being somewhat of a pioneer, having conducted and commissioned approximately one hundred works by prominent twentieth-century composers. In 1936, Sacher commissioned Bartók's celebrated work, Music for Strings, Percussion, and Celesta, for the tenth anniversary of the Basel Chamber Orchestra. Just three years later, Sacher commissioned a new work, one less demanding and for an ensemble of 22 players. Bartók's previous commissioned work was found to be extremely challenging and Sacher was now looking for something in the spirit of the eighteenth century, something simpler. The result of Sacher's request was the Divertimento for String Orchestra.

Bartók composed the piece within an astonishing 15 days, from August 2–17. Sacher provided Bartók with living arrangements at his family's Swiss chalet, Chalet Aellen, in Saanen (Berne), Switzerland during his time composing. To help aid Bartók in his writing of the work, Sacher provided Bartók with a piano and an on-hand chef. Just a day after he finished the composition, August 18, 1939, Bartók wrote his eldest son, Béla with excitement and news of his composition.

Somehow I feel like a musician of the olden time; the invited guest of a patron of the arts. For here I am, as you know, entirely the guest of the Sachers; they see to everything – from a distance. In a word, I am living alone – in a ethnographic object: a genuine peasant cottage. The furnishings are not in character, but so much better, because they are the last word in comfort. They even had a piano brought from Berne for me... Luckily the work went well, and I finished it in just 15 days (a piece of about 25 minutes), I just finished it yesterday... The newspapers are full of military articles, they have taken defense measures on the more important passes etc. – military preparedness. I am also worried about whether I shall be able to get home from here if this or that happens. Fortunately I can put this worry out of my mind if I have to... –Béla Bartók

== Interpretation ==
The conductor and ensemble who perform this work should understand the work within Bartók's oeuvre. Bartók's music has attained the “serious” stature and consideration with which comes a focus of the music's structure, rhetorical strengths, and tonal and rhythmic elements.

A quick look at the score demonstrates that even though Bartók wrote the Divertimento very quickly, he still provided his customary highly detailed instructions for performance. The first 24 measures contain two highly coordinated allargando, which serve to exaggerate the slightly off-kilter rhythm and sense of melodic propulsion. Bartók shifts timbres continually in this movement by alternating between tutti strings and soloists. The first mistake that a conductor may make is to allow his soloists to play with the typical orchestral solo attitude of “now it is my chance to be heard”. Nearly all the solo portions of the first movement are marked piano or mezzo-piano, and are often inserted between forte statements by the tutti strings. Clearly, by drastically reducing both the musical forces and the written dynamic Bartók was striving for some rather extreme shifts of aural mass. These shifts serve to heighten the lively, spontaneous character of the movement.

Bartók is also well known for his tempo markings, “…meticulous in the precise timings of his works, down to seconds, often showing the duration of each section of a movement.” The exact timings are given in the Divertimento score, and tempo markings are precisely given. The second movement includes 14 different metronome markings in only 74 bars of music, with measures 50–54 each having their own metronome marking. Recordings which adhere to the given timings tend to exhibit the typical Bartókian brightness in the outer movements, and the appropriately languorous “night music” atmosphere in the middle movement.
