= Répons =

Composition by Pierre Boulez

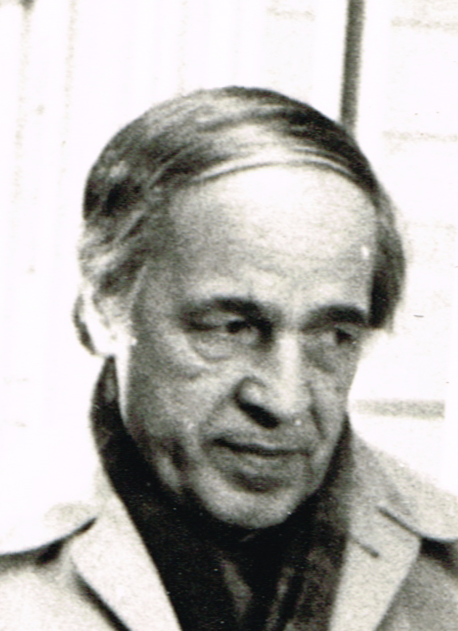
Pierre Boulez in 1985

Répons is a composition by French composer Pierre Boulez for a large chamber orchestra with six percussion soloists and live electronics. The six soloists play harp, cimbalom, vibraphone, glockenspiel/xylophone, and two pianos. It was premiered on 18 October 1981 at the Donaueschingen Festival. The composer expanded it until its completion in 1985. The work is dedicated to Alfred Schlee "on his 80th birthday".

Répons was the first significant work to come out of Boulez's endeavors at IRCAM, an institute in Paris devoted to making technological advances in electronic music. It has been celebrated for its integration of the electronic and the acoustic. Its title, Répons, reflects the fact that the composition is constructed on various types of responses: the acoustic sounds and electronic responses to them as well as the medieval idea of responsorial mirroring between players and speakers in different parts of the concert hall. Tom Service of The Guardian has called it "Boulez’s most ambitious masterpiece of electronic and acoustic fusion".

== The music ==
Répons is subdivided into an Introduction, Sections 1–8 and a Coda. Of the use of metre and harmony in Répons Boulez said:

Oh yes, there is a metre, slightly irregular on one level but very regular on another. There are so many irregular things in this piece that at one point you need to have a regular metre as you say – a bass and a regular pulse anyway – but also a series of harmonies which are all symmetrical. The harmony always gives this impression of something followed by its inverse; there is always a centre – an axis of symmetry. This symmetry of harmony corresponds in harmonic terms to a regular metre. This is very important. There are three types of time. That which is chaotic and irregular such as you have in the beginning (in the speed I mean). Then you have, in the speed, the very regular rapid repeated notes – always in semiquavers. Finally at the end there is a regularity, a kind of metre – but with much ornamentation. The ornamentation is in fact very irregular, but the metre itself is very regular.

The pitches of the row used in Répons are those based on the Sacher hexachord and used in the rows for several other Boulez compositions: Messagesquisse, Dérive 1, Incises, and Sur Incises.

Boulez selected the solo instruments, all pitched percussion, based on the ability of the computer equipment to "exploit their resonating characteristics to the limits of the technology available at the time".

=== Instrumentation ===
The piece is scored for the following ensemble, along with live electronics:

Soloists

vibraphone
glockenspiel
harp
cimbalom
2 pianos

Woodwinds

2 flutes
2 oboes
2 clarinets
bass clarinet
2 bassoons

Brass

2 horns
2 trumpets
2 trombones
tuba

Strings

3 violins
2 violas
3 violoncellos
contrabass

== Performance history and reception ==
Acknowledging the difficulty the work presents for the soloists, Boulez said: "I like virtuosity, although not for the sake of virtuosity but because it’s dangerous". As of 2010, Répons had been performed "just a few dozen times". The work's performance requirements, its "extraordinary demands on the acoustic space as well as the players", have required untraditional venues or adaptations of concert spaces. For a performance at New York's Carnegie Hall, "[t]he stage will be extended to cover the entire parquet level, with musicians both within and surrounding the audience, and speakers issuing the electronics from the perimeter and above." A 2015 performance in Amsterdam used as its venue an exhibition space created in the base of a gas tank built in 1902, and presented the work twice so that audience members could change their seats and hear the work a second time from a different location.

The work was commissioned by Southwest German Radio. The Ensemble InterContemporain conducted by Boulez presented the 1981 premiere in Donaueschingen of the original version's five sections lasting about twenty minutes. A 33-minute version was performed in London at the BBC Proms on 6 September 1982, and a forty-minute version containing seven sections in Turin in 1984.

Boulez conducted Ensemble InterContemporain in the New York premiere in the Columbia University Gymnasium on 5 March 1986, using his 1985 revision of the piece for 24 live musicians, six live soloists, and a digital processor 4X. In the New York Times Donal Henahan provided a negative assessment:

[T]he New York premiere of his Répons ... did not live up to the Concorde-like screams of hyperbole that have preceded the arrival of this 45-minute breeding of live music with computer-generated sounds. It was hard to imagine how Répons, as performed here in a particularly cold and inhospitable space ... could be thought of as anything more than a highly elaborated version of spatial ideas that Boulez, Stockhausen, Berio and others have given us many times. It represents, at best, a triumph of logistics and sound effects, though presented too pretentiously to be enjoyed even at that modest level.... The processor took in the sounds, changed them in timbre, volume and other ways and regurgitated the results, sending altered sounds whirling about the hall by means of what seemed to be dozens of strategically placed loudspeakers. No sound was left unamplified or untransformed, and yet the results soon became completely predictable and monotonous. Répons began in semidarkness, but about seven minutes into the performance the house lights came up suddenly, along with the loudness level. This offered some theatrical promise, but nothing else so dramatic happened all evening. The familiar Boulez style of composing, with its spasmodic gasps and lurches, did not permit much variety, even though the amplified sounds that issued from various corners of the hall could sometimes be savored as purely acoustical events. The work, however, simply went on and on to no purpose that I could discern. At odd moments it was superficially stimulating in the way a cold shower can be, but as music it added up to little more than a series of unconnected tone clusters, arpeggios and pedal notes.... However, rigorous its plan and structure may be–and no one doubts Mr. Boulez's ability to construct a score of great logical beauty–its effect was oddly random. Répons was a bath of sound, too long drawn out to be really invigorating. Perhaps at 10 or 15 minutes it might have kept one's attention better, but that is conjecture.

A 2003 performance in Carnegie Hall met with an enthusiastic reception, including "notable numbers of young people in bright T-shirts and scruffy jeans, who whooped and whistled after each work". In Anthony Tommasini's view, "audiences are ready for some challenges. The idea of Mr. Boulez's music may still seem intimidating, but the music itself is scintillating and restless. Yes, it's gritty and rigorous, but also sumptuous and fanciful". He described the work as a "breathless drama" and noted that "When the full ensemble played, the music moved in thickly layered, heaving gestures. Yet, remarkably, almost every tone and nuance was audible. And when the soloists entered, trading dizzying outbursts and ruminations–jazzy riffs from the xylophone, scurrying piano figurations–the sheer visceral excitement of being caught in the middle was like nothing else in music." Alex Ross noted the performative aspect of the conductor's role at the center of the action: "Boulez managed to give precise cues back over his shoulder, his force field radiating three hundred and sixty degrees."

French-Canadian musicologist Jean-Jacques Nattiez believes that Répons may become viewed as "one of the most significant works of the 20th century." Consistent with Boulez's compositions in general, one of the common praises of Répons is its internally consistent style. The piece is also praised for its use of a wide variety of modern compositional resources, "including electronic processing, the manipulation of spatial acoustics, and even a quasi-Minimalist use of repetitive cells."

Paul Griffiths compared Répons unfavorably to Boulez's Dialogue de l'ombre double. He found Répons "much more flamboyant" and wrote: "The opening is marvelous: the orchestra rushes about, looking for a way to start, or a way out, and then prepares for the grand entrance of the soloists. Some of the sounds are also fabulous: violins putting a whisker on rich, deep chimes, or electric zigzags of tone. But Dialogue, on the surface so severe, says more."

== Recordings ==
In 1996 Boulez conducted the Ensemble InterContemporain in a Deutsche Grammophon recording of this piece. Released in 1998, it won a Grammy in 2000 for best classical contemporary composition. Tommasini called it "an exhilarating performance".
