= Symphony No. 10 (Henze) =

Musical work by Hans Werner Henze

Symphony No. 10 (Sinfonia Nr. 10) by Hans Werner Henze was written between 1997 and 2000.

Unlike his Ninth Symphony, the Tenth has a more traditional four-movement symphonic structure. The first movement, entitled Ein Sturm (A Storm) is suitably tempestuous; the second, Ein Hymnus (A hymn) is for strings alone. The third movement scherzo, Ein Tanz (A dance), is dominated by percussion. The finale, Ein Traum, (A dream) dispenses with form, and builds to a climax involving the whole orchestra. The titles themselves are generic, that is they evoke motifs associated with them rather than any specific references.

The work was jointly commissioned by Paul Sacher and Simon Rattle. Rattle premiered the first movement only with the City of Birmingham Symphony Orchestra in March 2000 in Birmingham. The premiere of the full work was given at Lucerne on 17 August 2002 with the same forces. Henze dedicated the work to Sacher, who died before the premiere.
