= Walter Schulthess =

Swiss conductor and composer (1894–1971)

Walter Schulthess (24 July 1894 – 23 June 1971) was a Swiss conductor and composer.

== Biography ==
Schulthess was born in Zürich 24 July 1894" into the Schulthess family, a wealthy and renowned merchant family which ran a bakery and Konditorei at the Rüdenplatz in Zürich. (Note: The 18th-century educator and philanthropist Anna Pestalozzi-Schulthess also belonged to this family.) He studied in Munich and Berlin, then returned to Zürich.

Schulthess wrote instrumental and vocal music, and according to Nicolas Slonimsky "excelled in lyric songs, in a style resembling Othmar Schoeck's." He was married to the violinist Stefi Geyer from 1920 until her death in 1956, and with her and Paul Sacher founded the Collegium Musicum Zürich chamber orchestra in 1941. In later life he became more involved in musical organisation, serving as president of the jury for the Clara Haskil International Piano Competition, from its inception in 1963 until 1969.

Schulthess died in Zürich on 23 June 1971, at the age of 76.
