= Wilhelm Schulthess =

Swiss internist and paediatrician (1855-1917)

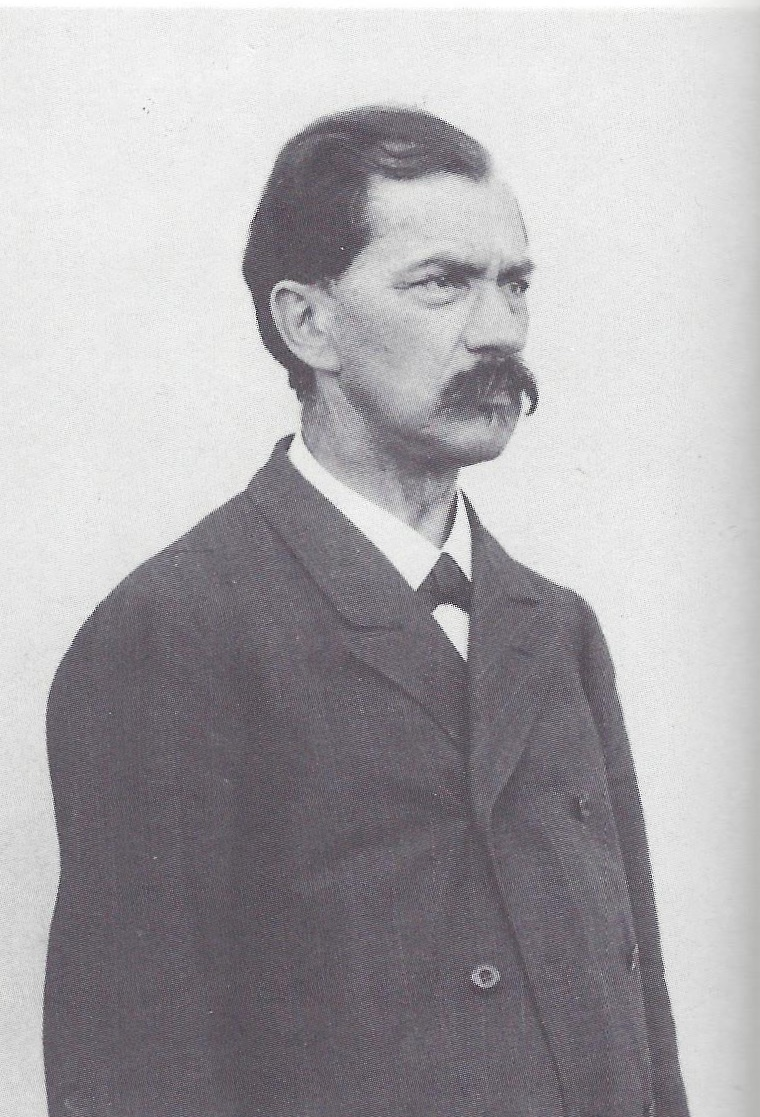
Wilhelm Schulthess

Wilhelm Schulthess (18 May 1855 in Villnachern – 6 March 1917 in Zürich) was a Swiss internist and paediatrician who worked in orthopaedics. In 1883 he co-founded the Orthopaedic Institute in Zürich, later known as the Schulthess Klinik. His research focused on scoliosis, where he developed methods for diagnosis and measurement. He also served as president of the German Society of Orthopaedic Surgery in 1908 and helped establish the Swiss Association for Crippled Children in 1909.

== Biography ==
He was born on 18 May 1855 in Villnachern to Edmund Schulthess (farmer, 4 January 1826 - 10 April 1906) and wife (m. 15 May 1851) Cornelia Brigitta Marth (22 June 1828 - 22 February 1896). He was the brother of politician Edmund Schulthess (1868–1944) and belonged to the Schulthess family of Zürich, which also included educator and philanthropist Anna Pestalozzi-Schulthess. The family were merchants who ran a bakery and Konditorei (confectionery) at the Rüdenplatz in Zürich.

In 1883 he co-founded a private clinic in Zürich, later known as the Orthopaedic Institute and eventually the Schulthess Klinik. In 1889 he obtained his habilitation, and in 1912 became an associate professor at the University of Zürich.

In 1908 he was appointed president of the Deutschen Gesellschaft für Orthopädische Chirurgie (German Society of Orthopaedic Surgery). He contributed to the founding of the Schweizerischen Vereins für krüppelhafte Kinder (Swiss Association for Crippled Children; 1909). The wording of the name reflects the terminology of the time.

He specialised in scoliosis research and developed methods for measuring and recording the degree and different types of the disorder.

In 1917, Schulthess died of a sudden heart attack during a consultation at the Orthopaedic Institute in Zürich. After his death, his colleague and co-founder August Lüning continued to run the institute, supported by Schulthess’s son-in-law Eugen Hallauer. Hallauer later assumed leadership during the war and postwar years, while maintaining many of Schulthess’s therapeutic approaches.

== Orthopaedic Institute ==
The Orthopaedic Institute was founded in 1883 by Wilhelm Schulthess and August Lüning at Löwenstrasse 16 in Zürich. At the time, orthopaedics was a relatively new and little-known field, and theirs was the only such institution in the city. There were no university-level programs in orthopaedics at the time. Schulthess and Lüning therefore learned through their own research and records. They treated several skeletal deformities, but scoliosis soon became their main focus. Before X-ray imaging in 1895, diagnoses were made through external observation, supported by measuring and drawing instruments used to record spinal curvatures.

In 1896, the institute moved to Neumünsterallee 3 to make room for its expanding work. By the early 20th century, it was known outside Zurich and was visited by physicians from abroad.

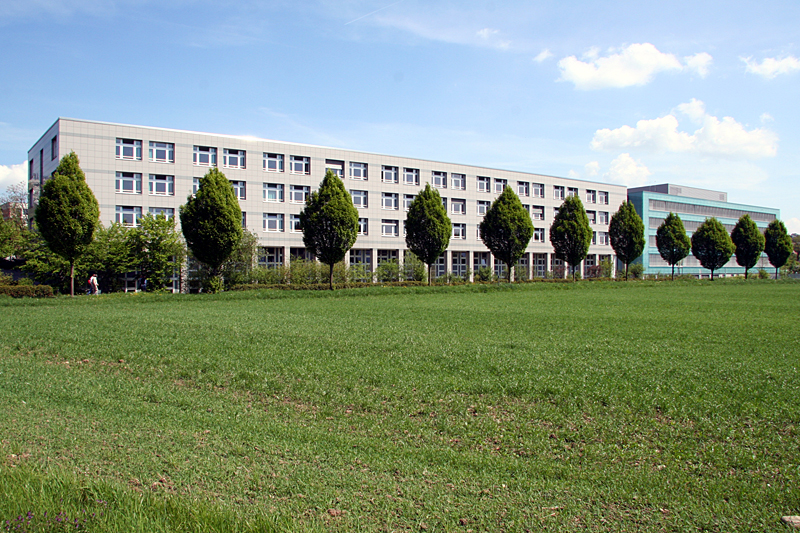
The Schulthess-Klinik in Zürich-Weinegg.

== Selected works ==
- Ein neuer Mess- und Zeichnungsapparat für Rückgratsverkrümmungen, 1887 – A new measurement and marking apparatus for spinal deformities.
- Klinische Studien über das Verhalten der physiologischen Krümmungen der Wirbelsäule bei Skoliose, 1889 – Clinical studies on the behavior of physiological curves of the spine in scoliosis.
- Messung und Röntgen'sche Photographie in der Diagnostik der Skoliose (with August Lüning, 1897/98) – Measurement and x-ray photography in the diagnostics of scoliosis.
- Die Krüppelfürsorge, 1912 – On the welfare of cripples.
- Die Pathologie und Therapie der Rückgratsverkrümmungen – Pathology and therapy for curvature of the spine.
- Die Anstalt Balgrist, Schweizerische Heil- und Erziehungsanstalt für krüppelhafte Kinder und orthopädische Poliklinik, 1914.

== See also ==
- Orthopedic surgery
