= Tema "Sacher" =

1976 work by Benjamin Britten

- by Benjamin Britten
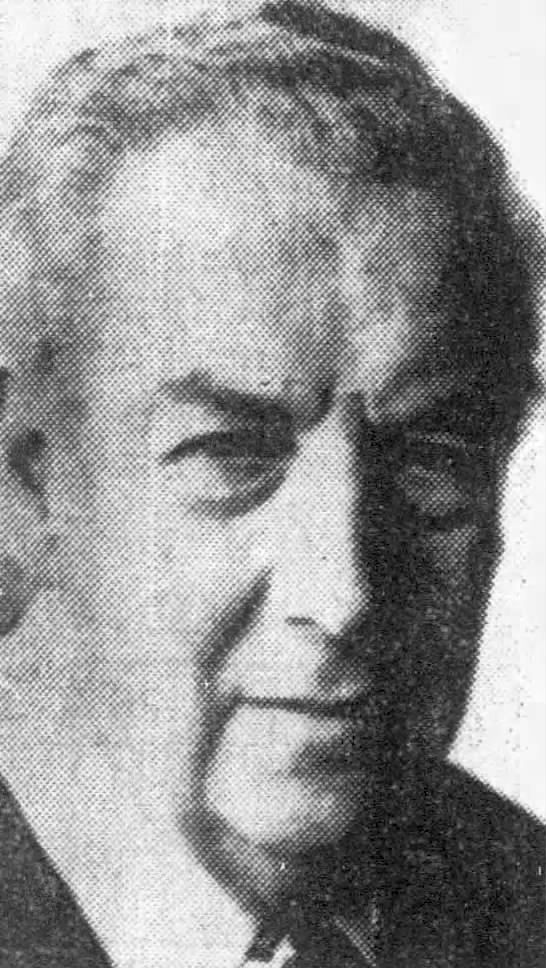
- Britten c. mid-1970s
- Key: C minor
- Composed: December 13, 1975 – January 5, 1976: Aldeburgh, England
- Dedication: Paul Sacher
- Published: 1990
- Publisher: Faber Music
- Duration: c. 1 minute

Premiere
- Date: May 2, 1976
- Location: Tonhalle, Zurich, Switzerland
- Performers: Mstislav Rostropovich

The Tema "Sacher" is a composition for solo cello by Benjamin Britten. He composed it between December 1975 and January 1976. It resulted from a request by the cellist Mstislav Rostropovich, who sought to assemble a collaborative musical work from various composers to commemorate the seventieth birthday of the music patron Paul Sacher. Rostropovich premiered the work at the Tonhalle in Zurich, Switzerland, on May 2, 1976. It was the last of Britten's works to be premiered in his lifetime.

== Background ==
Benjamin Britten's health declined rapidly in his final years, the result of a stroke he experienced during an unsuccessful surgical operation on his heart in 1973 and progressive heart failure. The latter left him exhausted and severely restricted his ability to compose. Britten reported to fellow composer Oliver Knussen on January 21, 1976, that his physical condition only permitted "an occasional tiny bit of writing". Britten's remaining compositions after he completed the opera Death in Venice in 1973, according to Ian Tait, the composer's general practitioner, were "more in response to the expectations of others—more not to let them down, than because of any overwhelming passion in himself".

On December 13, 1975, the cellist Mstislav Rostropovich asked Britten to participate in a collaborative musical project that would commemorate the seventieth birthday of the Swiss conductor and music patron Paul Sacher. The cellist wanted a theme and variations for solo cello, to which various other composers would also contribute. He proposed that Britten compose the work's theme based on the Sacher hexachord, the dedicatee's musical monogram. The composer immediately accepted and began work on the Tema "Sacher". He completed it on January 5, 1976.

In spite of Rostropovich's original idea, the other participating composers chose to compose works according to their personal preferences. The Tema "Sacher" was the last of Britten's cello works composed for Rostropovich.

== Music ==
The Tema "Sacher" is a fourteen-measure work for solo cello in the key of C minor. It consists of two blocks of material. The first is a melodic motif based on the Sacher hexachord, which is stated twice. This is followed by a perpetuum mobile based on the notes E and D. The musicologist Arnold Whittall said that the work is "more concerned with the manipulation or developing variation of foregrounded materials than with the composing out of deeper, foundational background forces".

Its duration is approximately one minute.

== Premiere and publication ==
The Tema "Sacher" was premiered by Rostropovich at the Tonhalle in Zurich, Switzerland, on May 2, 1976. It was the last of Britten's compositions to be premiered during his lifetime.

Universal Edition first published it together with its companion works in the collection 12 Hommages à Paul Sacher pour violoncelle. It was subsequently published individually by Faber Music in 1990.

== Reception ==
The musicologist Byron Adams appraised the Tema "Sacher" as a "truncated and barely coherent page [of music]" in his review of Faber Music's 1990 edition of the score. "[It] is a pathetic fragment which can only be explained by the desperate state of the composer's health at the time", he added.

Whittall, in his survey of Britten's music for cello, expressed a contrasting opinion:

[The] expansive and resolute rhetoric of this brief tribute seems to unite respect for Sacher to a still-vivid delight in Rostropovich's forceful personality and supremely refined instrumental technique.

He also called it an "appropriately arresting coda" to the musical partnership between Britten and Rostropovich.

== See also ==
- Messagesquisse
