= Concerto in D (Stravinsky) =

1946 composition by Igor Stravinsky

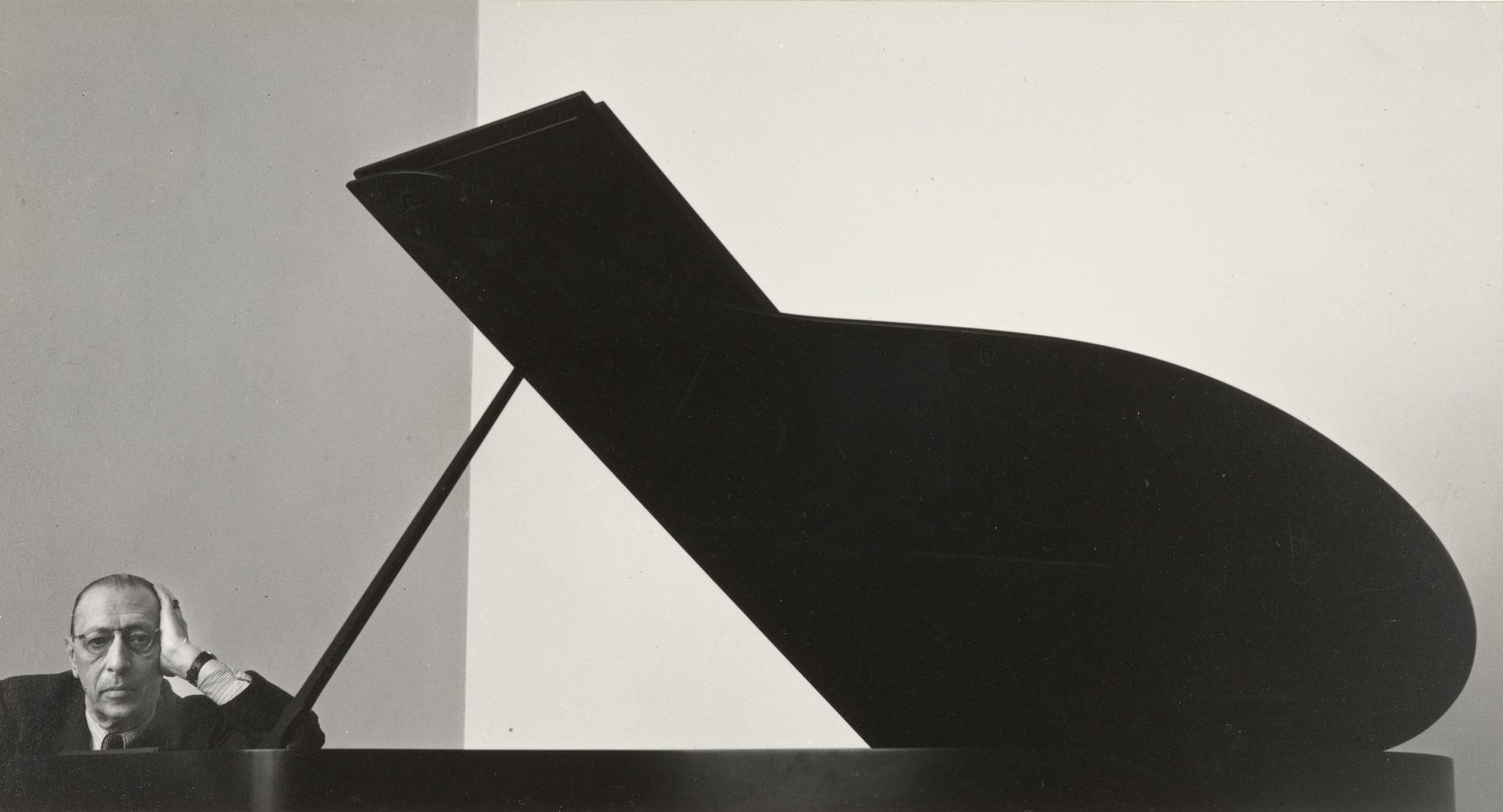
Photograph of Stravinsky by Arnold Newman

Igor Stravinsky's Concerto in D ("Basle") for string orchestra was composed in Hollywood between the beginning of 1946 and 8 August of the same year in response to a 1946 commission from Paul Sacher to celebrate the 20th anniversary of the Basler Kammerorchester (BKO—in English, Basel Chamber Orchestra), and for this reason is sometimes referred to as the "Basle" Concerto.

It was premiered on 27 January 1947 in Basel by the BKO, conducted by Paul Sacher. Other sources say it was six days earlier, on the day of the orchestra's 20th anniversary, 21 January, when two other works commissioned by Sacher were also premiered: Arthur Honegger's Symphony No. 4 Deliciae Basiliensis and Bohuslav Martinů's Toccata e due Canzoni.

The Concerto in D was the first composition Stravinsky created after becoming a naturalised American citizen on 28 December 1945 and the first of his works to be published under the contract with his new publisher, Boosey & Hawkes.

The concerto has been choreographed several times as a ballet, first by Dore Hoyer at the Hamburg State Opera in 1950. Later ballet versions were made by Jerome Robbins, under the title of The Cage in 1951, by Werner Ulbrich, as Attis und die Nymphe at the Württembergisches Staatstheater, Stuttgart, in 1959 and by Aimé De Lignière at the Royal Ballet of Flanders, as Acht in 1973.

== Movements ==
The concerto has three movements:

1. Vivace
2. Arioso: Andantino
3. Rondo: Allegro
