= Barbara Schulthess =

Swiss literary salon host (1745-1818)

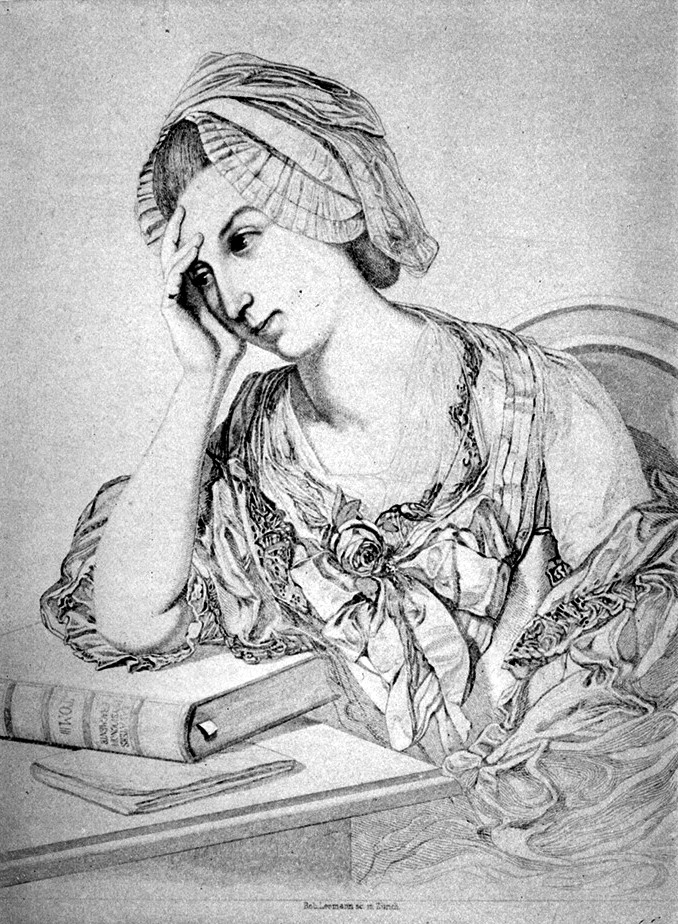
Barbara Schulthess

Barbara Schulthess (1745–1818), was a Swiss Salonnière. From 1772 onward, she hosted a literary salon in Zürich, which came to be regarded as the intellectual center of contemporary Zürich. She is known as the friend and correspondent of Johann Wolfgang von Goethe.

She was the daughter of a silk trader and married in 1763 the silk trader Hauptmann David Schulthess (d. 1778), born into the Schulthess family, a wealthy and renowned merchant family which ran a bakery and Konditorei (confectionery) at the Rüdenplatz in Zürich, to which belonged educator and philanthropist Anna Pestalozzi-Schulthess.
