= Stefi Geyer =

Hungarian violinist (1888–1956)

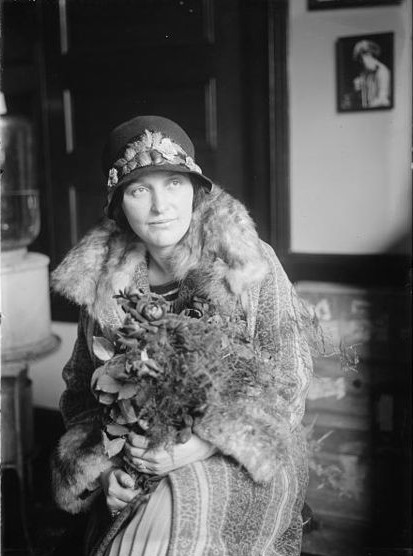
Stefi Geyer

Stefi Geyer (June 28, 1888 in Budapest – December 11, 1956 in Zürich) was a Hungarian violinist who was considered one of the leading violinists of her generation.

== Biography ==
Born in 1888 in Budapest, she was the daughter of Josef Geyer, a police doctor who played the violin himself. When she was 5 years old she started playing the violin, with remarkable results for someone who had not practiced at all. She subsequently studied under Jenő Hubay.

Béla Bartók and Othmar Schoeck, who were both in love with her, wrote violin concertos for her. Bartók's first violin concerto was published only after both he and Geyer had died. Willy Burkhard dedicated his 1943 violin concerto jointly to Geyer and Paul Sacher.

Her first marriage was to Vienna lawyer Edwin Jung. He died during the flu epidemic of the First World War. In 1920 she married Swiss composer Walter Schulthess. She moved to Zürich, where she gave concerts, founded the Collegium Musicum Zürich in 1941 with Schulthess and Sacher, and taught at the Zürich Conservatory from 1934 to 1953. (The Zürich Conservatory merged in 1999 into the School of Music, Drama, and Dance (HMT), itself merged in 2007 into the Zurich University of the Arts (ZHdK). She taught numerous musicians, among them composer Klaus Huber.
