= Schneewittchen (opera) =

1998 opera by Heinz Holliger

- Opera by Heinz Holliger
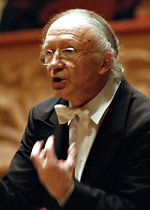
- The composer in 2008
- Librettist: Holliger
- Based on: Poetry by Robert Walser
- Premiere: 17 October 1998; Zurich Opera House

Schneewittchen (Snow White) is an opera by Heinz Holliger. He wrote the libretto based on a poetic text by Robert Walser in iambic trimeter. The opera received its première on 17 October 1998 at the Zurich Opera House which had commissioned the work. The work is a psychoanalytical reworking of the fairy tale of "Snow White", analysing the complex relationships between the roles. It is not a children's opera.

== History ==
Heinz Holliger adapted Schneewittchen from a Robert Walser play written in free verse. The full-length opera opened in 1998 with four performances at the Zürich Opera and two performances in Frankfurt, Germany. The opera begins with a prologue, continues with three middle scenes, and finishes with an epilogue.

== Synopsis ==
=== Prologue ===
The five characters introduce themselves to the audience.

=== Scene 1 ===
When the queen asks, apparently worried, about Snow White's health, she responds with serious accusations and recalls the multiple murder attempts of her mother-in-law: the huntsman tried to stab her after being made submissive by the queen's kisses, and the poisoned apple really did cause her pain. The queen denies everything. She advises Snow White to go out into the fresh air to relax and forget any previous misbehavior. Snow White now asks the huntsman to confirm her memories. The huntsman replies that he did not carry out the murder out of compassion and instead killed a deer. Snow White recalls the intimate relationship between the huntsman and the queen, which the prince also confirms. The queen continues to deny everything. She claims that she has always loved Snow White like her own child. She should not believe the slander from the fairy tale. Snow White still does not trust her. The prince agrees and suggests that they think about the past in peace. He leads Snow White into the castle. The queen and the huntsman remain behind.

=== Scene 2 ===
The prince describes his love to Snow White in exuberant words. However, the torrent of words is rather overwhelming for her. She would rather joke and dance carefree. Looking out of the window, the prince is fascinated by the queen and the huntsman making love in the garden and describes all the details to Snow White. She feels repelled by this, compares herself to the snow that sinks into the ground in the warmth of spring, and longs to be "smiling dead". The prince apologizes for having snatched her from the coffin in which she had already found the peace she longed for. He thinks that her anger will strengthen his love. But now he wants to go into the garden to separate the huntsman and the queen. Snow White asks him to send his loving regards to her mother-in-law. She forgives her and the prince should also ask her for forgiveness on her behalf. He promises to send the queen to her reconciled and leaves. While Snow White waits, she ponders the prince's infidelity.

=== Scene 3 ===
When the mother comes into the room, Snow White throws herself at her feet and asks for forgiveness. She no longer believes that her stepmother really wanted to kill her. Her feelings absolve her of all sin. Suspiciously, the queen reminds Snow White that she actually committed all these terrible deeds. Snow White is now deceiving herself. After all, the fairy tale also reports on her crimes and calls her an evil queen. Snow White is probably just trying to deceive her. The queen now describes her crimes in ruthless detail, to which she was driven by her hatred and jealousy of Snow White's beauty. But this is over. Now she wants to love. She asks Snow White to accept the prince as her lover. Despite his bitter words, she is "very good" to him.

=== Scene 4 ===
The prince explains to the queen that Snow White resents him for saving her from the coffin. He is no longer interested in the girl, but confesses his love to the queen. The queen is confused by his sudden change of heart, asks him to be patient and calls the huntsman in. He and Snow White are to re-enact the scene of his attempted murder. When Snow White begs for mercy and the huntsman wants to lower his weapon in pity, the queen demands a change: the huntsman should really kill her now. Frightened, the prince intervenes. The queen laughs and exclaims that it is all just a game. She invites everyone to take a walk in the garden, where she wants to prove that she is not evil.

=== Scene 5 ===
Like in the beginning, Snow White believes that her mother-in-law hates her to death. She longs for her quiet life with the dwarves, where she never felt any resentment. She regrets having returned home of her own free will. Even in a coffin, she would have had more fun than here. The stepmother initially tries to calm her down, but then loses patience and calls the huntsman to help her. He is to comfort Snow White in her place and carefully explain her feelings to her. Snow White hesitantly admits that she wants to believe him, even if he is lying. The huntsman then declares the queen to be "free of guilt and shame". Her instigation of murder, as described in the fairy tale, is untrue. She has no reason to be jealous of Snow White's beauty, since she is beautiful herself. He also never wanted to kill her, and the story of the poisonous apple is itself a poisonous lie. He asks Snow White to kiss the stepmother as a sign of her love. Snow White does so.

=== Epilogue ===
When the king arrives with the prince and his entourage of noblemen and ladies-in-waiting, Snow White asks him to settle the dispute once and for all. The queen explains to him, however, that love has already triumphed. Their former hatred was merely a fleeting whim. The king points out that the prince has made serious accusations against the huntsman. Snow White replies that this is not true. The huntsman is honorable and has no love affair with the queen. The queen and Snow White ask the prince to drop his accusations. The prince, however, cannot let the past rest. He withdraws uncertainly. Snow White asks the huntsman to bring him back. The queen is confident that the prince will relent and resume his relationship with Snow White. When she remembers her misdeeds once again, Snow White interrupts her: only fairy tales say such things, never she herself. Her doubts are over, and everyone returns to the castle.

== Roles ==
Roles, voice types, premiere cast
Role	Voice type	Premiere cast: 17 October 1998 Conductor: Heinz Holliger
Schneewittchen (Snow White)	soprano	Juliane Banse
Königin (Queen)	mezzo-soprano	Cornelia Kallisch
Prinz (Prince)	tenor	Steve Davislim
Jäger (Huntsman)	baritone	Oliver Widmer
König (King)	bass	Werner Gröschel
There are no dwarfs.

== Orchestration ==
Holliger scored Schneewittchen for a medium-sized orchestra, with even a small string section with just 7 soloists, but with a large percussion section.

- Woodwinds: 2 flutes (both doubling piccolo and alto flute), 2 oboes (2nd doubling english horn), 3 clarinets in B♭ (2nd doubling clarinet in A, 2nd and 3rd doubling bass clarinet), 2 bassoons (2nd doubling contrabassoon)
- Brass: 2 horns, 2 trumpets, 2 trombones, tuba
- Percussion: timpani, percussion, 4 players (glockenspiel, vibraphone, marimba, triangle, tubular bells, crotales, four gongs, three suspended cymbals, pair of cymbals, three tamtams, four tomtoms, four bongos, two wooden drums, stirrer drum, snare drum, bass drum, two woodblocks, four marimbaphones, güiro, geophone, two sand blocks, two pan lids, two metal blocks, washboard with thimbles, shell chimes, metal chimes, glass chimes, bamboo chimes, whip, broken glass and stones in clay pot, paper, sandpaper on tam-tam, water gong, wind machine, hyoshigi, rods, ratchets, flexatone, singing saw, lotus flute, rain tree, anvil, claves, hum pot, impact stick, super ball)
- harp, accordion, glass harmonica, celesta
- Strings: 2 violins, 2 violas, 2 cellos, double bass (5-stringed)

== Recordings ==
ECM Records released a recording as a two-compact disc set in 2001, recorded by the same performers as in its 1998 premiere in Zürich. Juliane Barse starred as Schneewittchen, while Cornelia Kallisch performed as the Queen. In addition to the leads, tenor Steve Davislim, baritone Oliver Widmer, and bass Werner Gröschel were backed by the same orchestra as in the premiere.
