= Dérive 1 =

- by Pierre Boulez
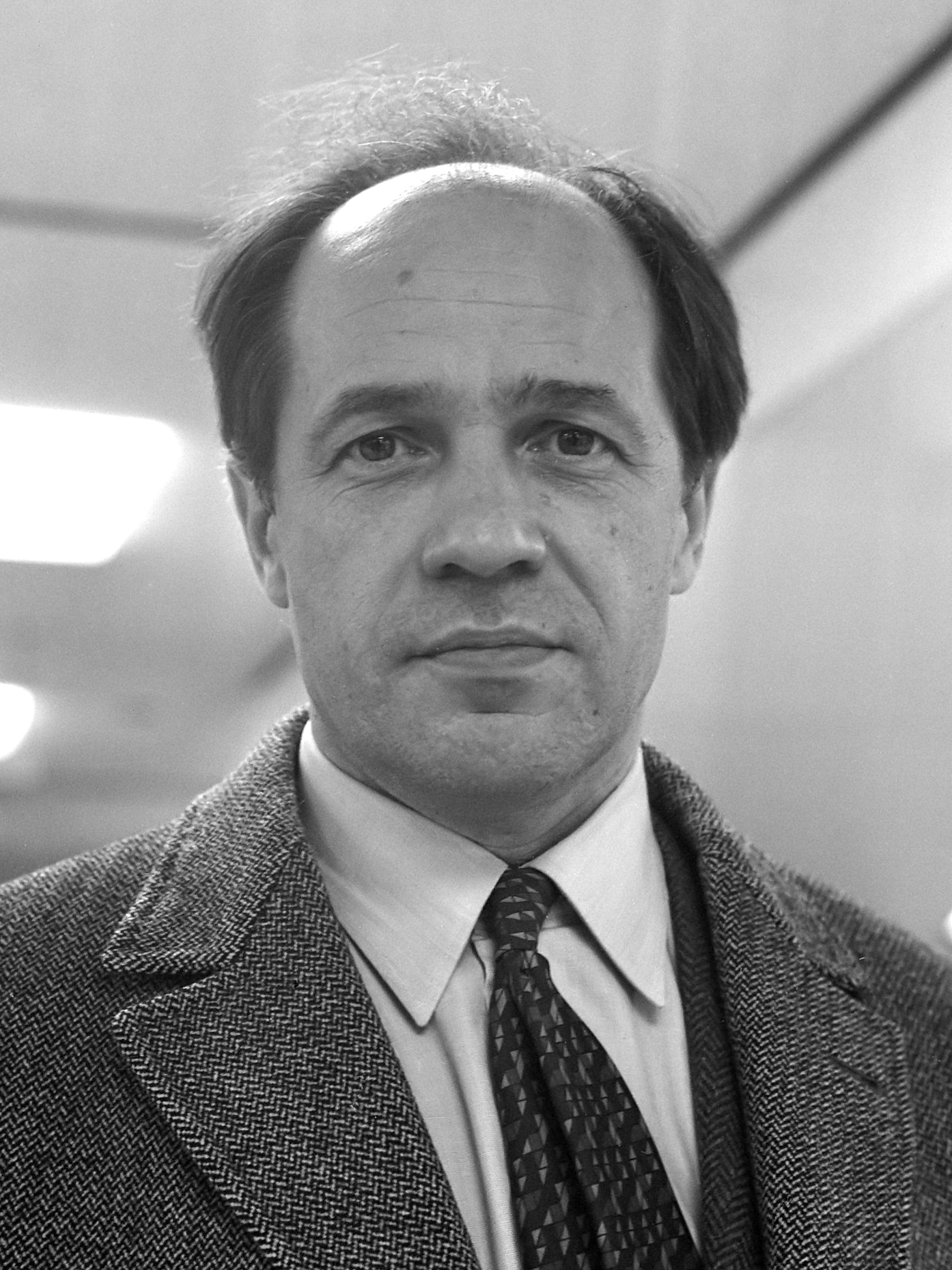
- Pierre Boulez in 1968
- Composed: 1984
- Performed: January 30, 1985, London
- Published: Universal Edition
- Movements: 1
- Scoring: Flute, clarinet, violin, cello, vibraphone and piano

Dérive 1 (originally entitled Dérive, from the French word meaning derivative or drift) is a composition for six-part instrumental ensemble by French composer Pierre Boulez. It was composed in 1984.

== Composition ==
This short composition derives from two other compositions by Boulez, namely, Répons (1981) and Messagesquisse (1976–1977). It is similar to Répons in the sense that it is also a short piece for ensemble, as many others came about in the eighties, as pieces exploiting ideas that are presented in larger works by Boulez. Répons was created also as a re-elaboration of musical ideas from Éclat/Multiples (1970). This working method is typical of Boulez and is also displayed in the second part of the series of Dérives, Dérive 2, which was considered to be a work in progress for years and had several revisions, expansions and reworkings.

This piece was finished in 1984, and premiered in Bath, Great-Britain, on June 8 of the same year, with Oliver Knussen conducting the London Sinfonietta. It was dedicated to William Glock and was later published by Universal Edition.

== Structure ==
This composition is in one movement and has a total duration of 7–8 minutes. It is scored for a Pierrot ensemble (flute, clarinet in A, violin, cello, and piano) with the addition of a vibraphone. The score also calls for a conductor, even though the piece should probably be included in the chamber music category. Given the difficulty of the piece, most ensembles follow Boulez's instructions and use a conductor. Its structure is extracted from an idea based on the Sacher hexachord.

Dérive 1 is divided into two sections. The first section, bars 1–27, is characterized by a slow pulse ornamented by percussive and rapid arpeggios made by different instruments. The second section, bars 27–46, consists of a long crescendo which leads to a climax at bar 41. On the third beat of bar 46 a short coda ensues, repeating the same chord while using the ornaments from section one.

The tempo is "Très lent, immuable" (French: Very slow, unchanging) at a maximum of = 40. This tempo is maintained throughout the first section of the piece, spanning the first 27 bars. Then, during section two, the tempo slowly and gradually drops to = 60 on the climax at bar 41. After that, the piece slowly goes back to the tempo primo for the coda.

Boulez frequently uses a technique that he had been developing for a long time since his Piano Sonata No. 2 which was coined by Moguillansky as "fixed-register pitches", that is, fixing some or all notes of the chromatic scale so that each note will only appear in a specific octave. This chord construction method is similar to the process of chord multiplication devised by Boulez for organizing pitch register in Le Marteau sans maître.
