= Paul Sacher =

Swiss conductor, patron and billionaire businessman (1906–1999)

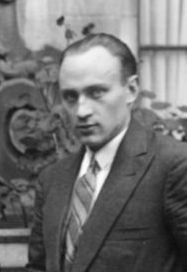
Sacher in 1930

Paul Sacher (28 April 1906 – 26 May 1999) was a Swiss conductor, patron and billionaire businessman. At the time of his death, Sacher was the majority shareholder of the Hoffmann-La Roche pharmaceutical company and was considered the third richest person in the world, with an estimated net worth of US$13 billion.

He founded and conducted the Basler Kammerorchester (1926–1987). He commissioned notable works by composers of the 20th century and premiered them with the chamber orchestra. While better known for his interest in new music, he was also devoted to music of the baroque and classical eras. He founded the Schola Cantorum Basiliensis, an institute for early music, in 1933.

== Biography ==
Sacher studied under Felix Weingartner, among others. In 1926 he founded the chamber orchestra Basler Kammerorchester, which specialized in both modern (twentieth-century) and pre-classical (mid-eighteenth-century) repertory. In 1928 he founded the Basel Chamber Choir. Both the orchestra and choir gave their last performance in 1987. In 1984, the Serenata Basel was formed, with no direct connection to Sacher. They later adopted the name Kammerorchester Basel. He also founded the Collegium Musicum Zürich in 1941 with Walter Schulthess and Stefi Geyer which he conducted until its disbandment in 1992.

== Personal life ==
Sacher was considered the world's third-richest man of the 1990s after inheriting a fortune from his late wife, Maja Hoffmann (1896–1989), who was the widow of Emanuel Hoffmann (1896–1932) and heiress of the pharmaceutical company Hoffmann-La Roche. At the time of his death, Sacher was reputed in various publications to be the richest man in Europe. He died in 1999 at the age of 93.

Sacher had 3 children outside marriage; two daughters, Katharina and Cornelia von Faber-Castell, with the Countess of Faber-Castell, and a son, Georg Schmid.

=== Commissions ===
Immensely wealthy, Sacher commissioned works from many well-known composers, including:

- Igor Stravinsky (who provided him with the Concerto in D)
- Béla Bartók (Divertimento for Strings, the Sonata for Two Pianos and Percussion, the String Quartet No. 6 and the Music for Strings, Percussion and Celesta)
- Bohuslav Martinů (many works including the Double Concerto for Two String Orchestras, Piano, and Timpani, Concerto da camera, etc.)
- Arthur Honegger (many works, including his Second and Fourth Symphony Deliciae Basilienses)
- Frank Martin (six works, including the Petite symphonie concertante)
- Paul Hindemith
- Hans Werner Henze
- Richard Strauss
- Elliott Carter
- Witold Lutosławski (Sacher-Variationen, Double Concerto, Chain II)
- Henri Dutilleux (Trois strophes sur le nom de Sacher and Mystère de l'instant)
- Harrison Birtwistle

Pierre Boulez wrote his Grawemeyer Award-winning work Sur Incises for Sacher's 90th birthday. Boulez bequeathed his entire catalogue (including drafts) to the Paul Sacher Foundation. Henze dedicated his Tenth Symphony to the memory of Sacher, who had commissioned it but died before its completion.

In 1983, Sacher acquired the Stravinsky estate. The Paul Sacher Stiftung (Foundation) is located in the centre of Basel (in Münsterplatz) and houses one of the world's most important musical-manuscript collections. Sacher bought most of these manuscripts himself, and they include complete collections by several important twentieth-century composers (including Lutosławski, Ligeti, Boulez and Reich). In 1997, he received an honorary doctorate from the Academy of Music in Kraków.

== "eSACHERe" ==
On the occasion of Sacher's 70th birthday, twelve composer friends of his (Conrad Beck, Luciano Berio, Pierre Boulez, Benjamin Britten, Henri Dutilleux, Wolfgang Fortner, Alberto Ginastera, Cristóbal Halffter, Hans Werner Henze, Heinz Holliger, Klaus Huber and Witold Lutosławski) were asked by Russian cellist Mstislav Rostropovich to write compositions for cello solo using his name spelled out in musical notes (musical cryptogram) as the theme (eS, A, C, H, E, Re). Many of them were performed in a Zurich concert on 2 May 1976. The whole "eSACHERe" project was performed in its entirety for the first time by Czech cellist František Brikcius on 9 May 2011 in Prague.

Composer	Composition
Conrad Beck	Für Paul Sacher : Drei Epigramme für Violoncello solo
Luciano Berio	Les Mots sont allés
Pierre Boulez	Messagesquisse, for 7 cellos
Benjamin Britten	Tema "Sacher"
Henri Dutilleux	Trois Strophes sur le nom de Sacher
Wolfgang Fortner	Zum Spielen für den 70. Geburtstag : Thema und Variationen für Violoncello Solo
Alberto Ginastera	Puneña No. 2, Op. 45
Cristóbal Halffter	Variationen über das Thema eSACHERe
Hans Werner Henze	Capriccio per Paul Sacher
Heinz Holliger	Chaconne, für Violoncello Solo
Klaus Huber	Transpositio ad infinitum
Witold Lutosławski	Sacher-Variationen
