= Conrad Beck =

Swiss composer (1901–1989)

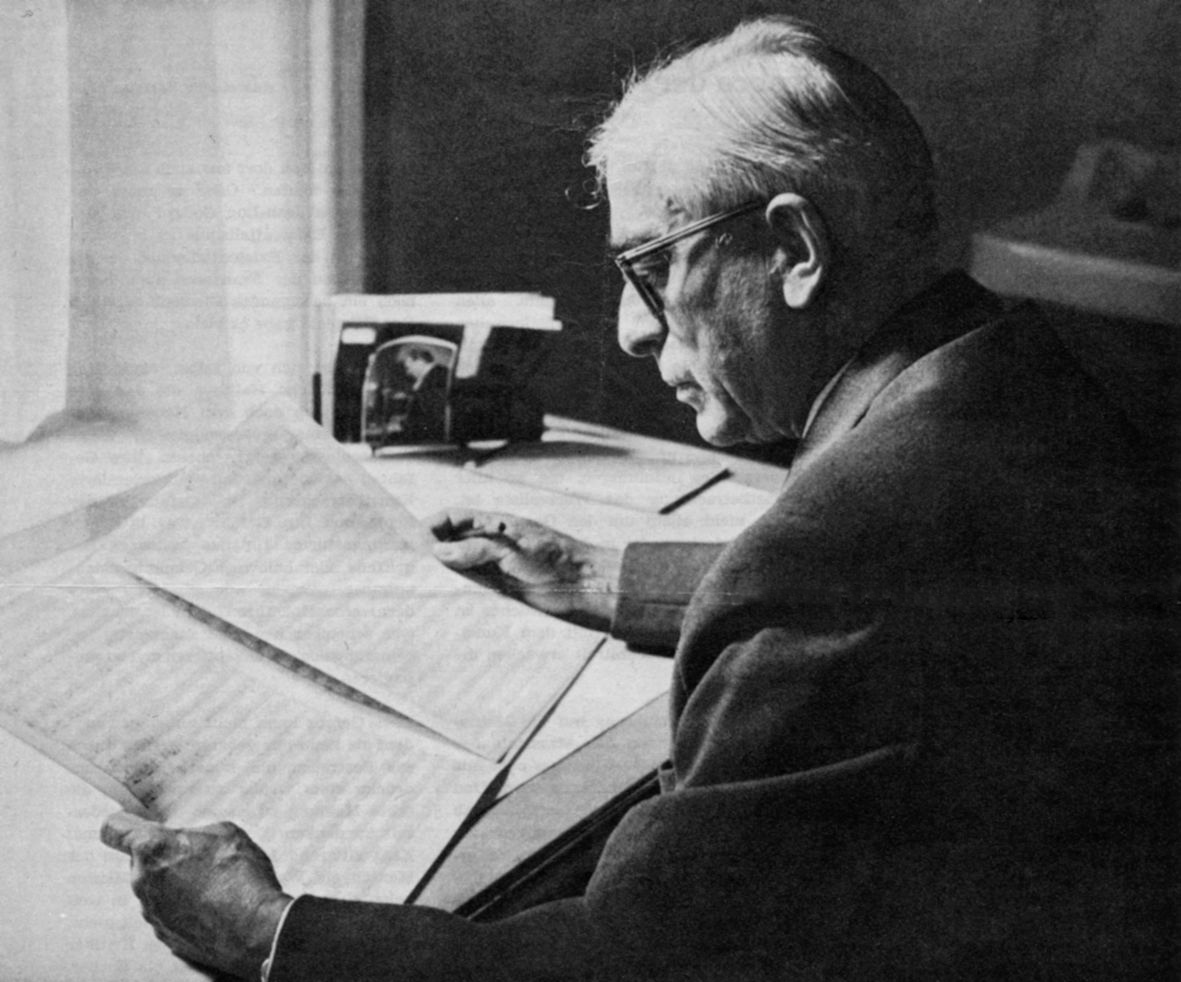
Conrad Beck in 1961

Conrad Arthur Beck (16 June 1901 – 31 October 1989) was a Swiss composer.

== Life and works ==
Beck's stay in Paris between 1924 and 1933 proved crucial to his artistic development, where he studied with Jacques Ibert and also made contact with Arthur Honegger, Nadia Boulanger, and Albert Roussel. Returning to Basel in 1933, he headed the music department of Radio Basel for the next thirty years. He helped mediate cultural exchange through his many contacts with Swiss and international musicians.

At the suggestion of Swiss conductor Paul Sacher (1906–1999), who promoted his career more than any other composer, Beck settled in Basel in 1934. During a period of over 50 years, Sacher commissioned his works and conducted their premieres with the chamber orchestra Basler Kammerorchester and the Collegium Musicum Zürich. From 1939 to 1966 Beck worked as music director of Swiss Radio in Basel, a position that enabled him to do a great deal to promote contemporary music.

On the occasion of Paul Sacher's 70th birthday, Beck was asked, together with 11 composer friends (Luciano Berio, Pierre Boulez, Benjamin Britten, Henri Dutilleux, Wolfgang Fortner, Alberto Ginastera, Cristóbal Halffter, Hans Werner Henze, Heinz Holliger, Klaus Huber and Witold Lutosławski), by Russian cellist Mstislav Rostropovich to write a composition for cello which used the notes creating Sacher's name: eS, A, C, H, E, Re (E♭, A, C, B, E, D). Beck created a three-movement work entitled Für Paul Sacher, drei Epigramme for cello solo. The compositions were partially presented in Zürich on 2 May 1976.

His honours include the composition prize of the Schweizerischer Tonkünstlerverein (1954), the Ludwig Spohr Prize of the city of Brunswick (1956) and the Basle Arts Prize (1964).

Beck's music is characterized by a large measure of seriousness, tenacity, and depth of expression, but also by transparency and a sense of harmonic proportion. He composed a number of orchestral and choral works in the style of Arthur Honegger, the best known of which was Der Tod zu Basel, a piece for choir, soloists, speaker, and orchestra. Besides opera, his work extended to all kinds of instrumental and vocal music, including seven symphonies, seven concertos, chamber music, one oratorio, one lyric cantata, one elegy, and one ballet, Der große Bär.

== Biography ==
=== Early years ===
The son of pastor Bernhard Beck and British architect's daughter Lydia Barker, Conrad Beck was born in Lohn, Schaffhausen. and raised in Zürich. After his Matura, he first studied at Zürich's Eidgenössische Technische Hochschule. Following private piano lessons from Carl Baldegger and harmony lessons from Paul Müller-Zürich, he decided on a musical career. He studied at the Zürich Conservatory with Volkmar Andreae (composition), Reinhold Laquai (counterpoint) and Carl Baldegger (piano).

=== Stay in Paris ===
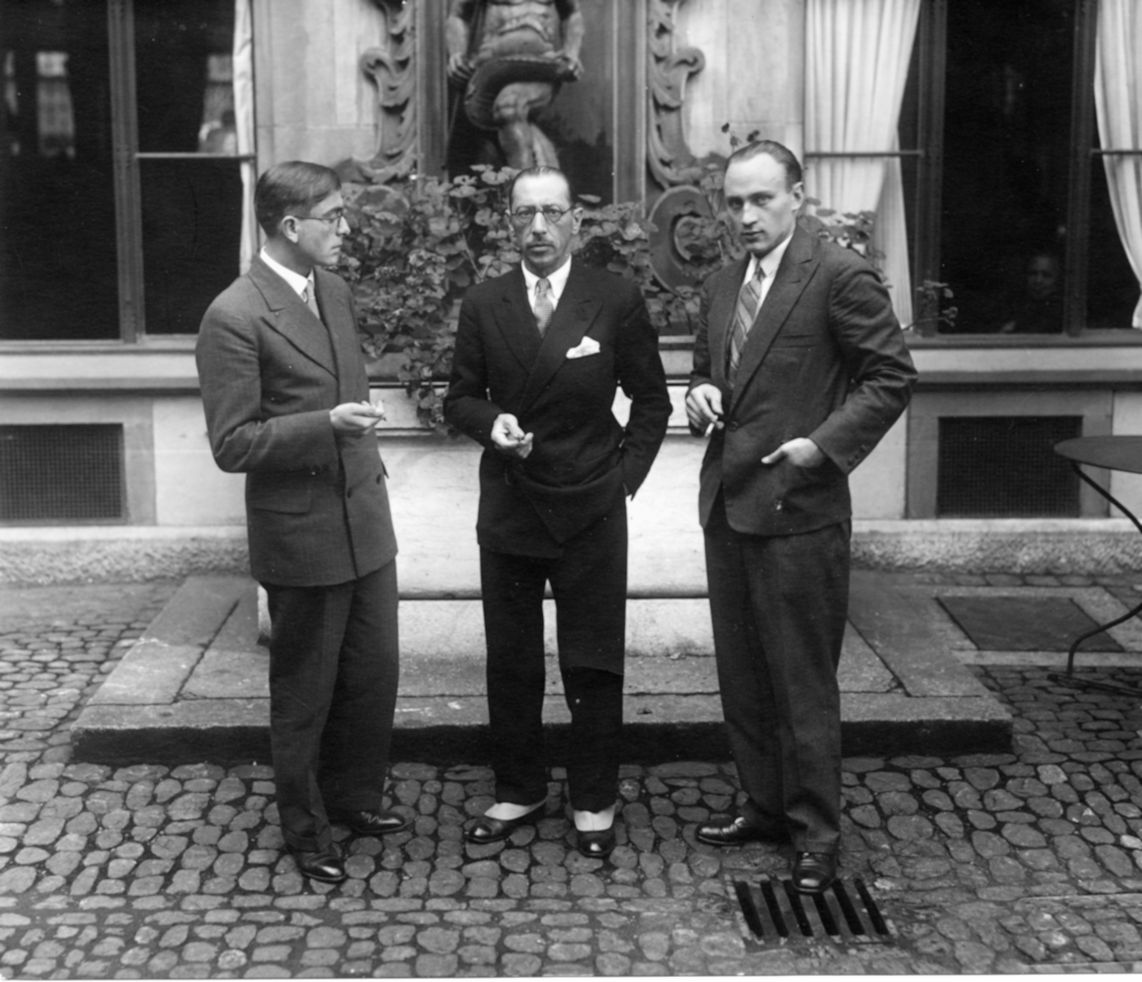
Beck, Stravinsky, Sacher (October 1930)

In 1924 he moved to Paris, where he studied instrumentation privately with Jacques Ibert, along with further instruction from Basel composer Ernst Levy. He also sought advice from Nadia Boulanger, Arthur Honegger and Albert Roussel. Soon he could be counted among Boulangers inner circle of friends. The early encouragement he received and the lifelong friendships dating back to his time in Paris would play an important role in his life. The Winterthur patron Werner Reinhart provided additional impetus. From 1927 on, his works were published by Schott in Mainz. When in 1933 the national socialists took power and "aryanized" the cultural scene, this contract was terminated after Beck refused to sign a statement supporting an "Aryan" view of art. It was only after 1945 that Schott once again became Beck's publisher.

=== Move to Basel ===
Beck relocated to Basel in 1933 at the suggestion of the conductor and music patron Paul Sacher, to whom he had introduced his friend Bohuslav Martinů. For five decades, Paul Sacher championed Beck, commissioning and conducting premieres of his works with the Basler Kammerorchester and the Collegium Musicum Zürich. From 1936 to 1966 he was music director of Radio Basel. Both here and on the board of the local branch of the IGNM (International Society for Contemporary Music) he was committed to promoting contemporary music. He saw it as an opportunity to encourage young composers even as their music and aesthetics were very different of that of his generation.

Since 1963 Beck lived alternately in Rosey (Franche-Comté) and Basel where he died in 1989, aged 88.

=== Activities as juror and expert ===
Upon retirement, Beck was frequently called upon as juror and expert. From 1960 to 1980, as counselor to the Fondation Prince Pierre, he sat on the jury of the Monaco composition competition. He also appeared in this function at the Concours Niccolò Paganini in Genua (1973) and at musical competitions in Oslo, Stockholm and Zürich.

=== Honours ===
In 1954 Beck was awarded the composition prize of the Schweizerischer Tonkünstlerverein, and in 1956 the Ludwig Spohr Prize of the city of Braunschweig. He received the Basle Arts Prize in 1964. In 1973, Beck was appointed Commandeur de l'ordre du Mérite Culturel by Prince Rainier III of Monaco.

=== Special services to contemporary music ===
Beck proposed and arranged numerous original and first performances in the Basel local branch of the IGNM, including among others the première of the last work by Albert Roussel, the string trio Op. 58 (1937) composed especially for a Basel Jubilee concert the year he died. Shortly before this, Beck had organized the Swiss première of Roussel's "Psalm 80" in Zürich, and introduced the French composer to Werner Reinhart, Othmar Schoeck and other Swiss musicians.

Beck's musical estate is held in the Paul Sacher Stiftung in Basel.

== Beck's music ==
From early on, one notes an anti-romantic position in his extensive and varied output, which includes all important genres except opera. This is reflected to the very end in a clear and linear style. Polyphonic structures are central to Beck's music. Voices that strive towards or away from each other are particularly typical of his subtle counterpoint. His dissonance-rich harmonies result predominantly from the respective part-writing.

A harsh sonority dominates many works which venture into atonal regions, their themes often derived from complex chords. Owing to his close links to the French music of the Paris group Les Six and the work of his friends in L'École de Paris, Beck's music is often vividly rhythmical. This is instrumental in lightening his inborn Alemannic gravity and an introspection which often comes to the fore in slow movements.

== Position in musical history ==
Although neo-baroque and neo-classical elements alternate in his output, Beck does not fit into either of these movements. Based on music created during the 1920s in Paris by Stravinsky, Honegger, Roussel, Milhaud and other French composers, Beck developed an independent, predominantly lyrical and deeply expressive style.

During the 1930s Beck, with his composer friends Tibor Harsányi (Hungary), Bohuslav Martinů (Czechoslovakia), Marcel Mihalovici (Rumania), Alexandre Tansman (Poland) and Alexander Tcherepnin (Russia), formed L'École de Paris, whose concerts occasionally also featured Alexander Spitzmüller-Harmersbach (Austria).

The 1928 première in Boston of the Third Symphony, conducted by Serge Koussevitsky, was followed by further important performances of Beck's works under Ernest Ansermet, Ernest Bour, Hans Münch, Hans Rosbaud, Hermann Scherchen and Walter Straram, among others.

== Selected works ==
Stage

- Der große Bär (The Big Bear), Ballet (1935–1936)

Orchestra

- Aeneas Silvius, Symphony (1957)
- Concertato (1964)
- Fantasie (1969)
- Hommages 1. "Dans le lointain...", 2. "...et dans le présent" (1965)
- Hymne (1952)
- Innominata (1931)
- Kammerkonzert (1971)
- Kleine Suite for string Orchestra (1930)
- Nachklänge, Tripartita for orchestra (1983)
- Ostinato (1936)
- Sonatina (1958)
- Suite Concertante for winds, percussion and double bass (1961)
- Symphony No. 3 for string orchestra (1927)
- Symphony No. 4 "Konzert für Orchester" (1928)
- Symphony No. 5 (1930)
- Symphony No. 6 (1950)

Concertante

- Concertino for clarinet, bassoon and orchestra (1954)
- Concertino for oboe and orchestra (1962)
- Concertino for Piano and orchestra (1927–1928)
- Concerto for clarinet and orchestra (1967–1968)
- Concerto for piano and orchestra (1930)
- Concerto for string quartet and orchestra (1929)
- Concerto for viola and orchestra (1949)
- Concerto for wind quintet and orchestra (1976)
- Kammerkonzert for violin and orchestra (1949)
- Konzertmusik for oboe and string orchestra (1932)
- Lichter und Schatten (Lights and Shadows), 3 movements for 2 horns, percussion and string orchestra (1982)
- Serenade for flute, clarinet and string orchestra (1935)

Chamber music

- Alternances for clarinet, cello and piano (1980)
- Duo for 2 violins (1960)
- Duo for violin and viola (1934–1935)
- Facetten, three impromptus for trumpet and piano (1975)
- Intermezzo for horn and piano (1948)
- Légende for clarinet and piano (1963)
- Nocturne for alto saxophone and piano (1969)
- Sonata No. 2 for cello and piano (1954)
- Sonata No. 2 for violin and piano (1948)
- Sonatina for cello and piano (1928)
- Sonatina for 2 flutes (1971)
- Sonatina for flute and 1 or 2 violins
- Sonatina for flute and piano (1960)
- Sonatina for oboe and piano (1957)
- Sonatina for viola and piano (1976–1977)
- Sonatina for violin and piano (1928)
- String Quartet No. 3 (1927)
- String Quartet No. 4 (1935)
- String Quartet No. 5 (1967)
- String Trio No. 1 (1928)
- String Trio No. 2 (1947)
- Three Epigrammes for cello solo (1976)
- Trio for flute, oboe and piano (1983)

Piano

- Sonatina (1928)
- Sonatina No. 2 (1951)
- Sonatina for piano 4-hands (1955)

Organ

- Choral Sonata (1950)
- Sonatina (1958)
- Zwei Präludien (2 Preludes) (1932)

Vocal

- Die Sonnenfinsternis, Cantata (1967)
- Der Tod des Oedipus, Cantata for soprano, tenor, baritone, mixed chorus, organ, 2 trumpets, 2 trombones and timpani (1928)
- Der Tod zu Basel, Großes Miserere for soprano, bass, 3 speakers, mixed chorus and orchestra (1952)
- Elegie, solo cantata after Friedrich Hölderlin (1972)
- Herbstfeuer, 6 songs for alto and chamber orchestra (1956)
- 3 Herbstgesänge for voice and piano or organ
- Kammerkantate after Sonnets of Louise Labé for soprano, flute, piano and string orchestra (1937)
- Lyrische Kantate for soprano, alto, female chorus and small orchestra (1931)
- Suite nach Volksliedern im Jahresablauf (1947)
