= Heinz Holliger =

Swiss composer, oboist, and conductor (born 1939)

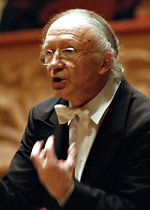
- Born: 21 May 1939 (age 87); Langenthal, Switzerland
- Education: Conservatory of Bern
- Occupations: Composer, oboist, conductor

Heinz Robert Holliger (born 21 May 1939) is a Swiss composer, oboist, conductor and pianist. Known for his versatility and virtuosic technique, Grove Music Online credits him with raising the prominence of the oboe and enlarging its repertoire. A prominent figure in contemporary classical music, many leading composers have written for him, including Messiaen, Berio, Carter, Henze, Krenek, Lutosławski, Martin, Penderecki, Stockhausen and Yun.

A composer himself, Holliger has contributed his own oboe compositions, alongside works such as the opera Schneewittchen (1998).

== Biography ==
Holliger was born in Langenthal, Switzerland. An oboist since age eleven, he studied at the conservatory of Bern before taking first prize in oboe at the Geneva International Music Competition in 1959. In 1966, he began teaching at the Hochschule für Musik Freiburg.

Many composers have written works for him, including Luciano Berio, Elliott Carter, Hans Werner Henze, Ernst Krenek, Witold Lutosławski, Frank Martin, Krzysztof Penderecki, Henri Pousseur, Karlheinz Stockhausen, Sándor Veress and Isang Yun.

In 1972, Maurice Bourgue (oboe), Klaus Thunemann (bassoon), Christiane Jaccottet (continuo), Holliger, and others recorded Jan Dismas Zelenka's Six Trio Sonatas for oboe and bassoon. This recording is credited with the "Zelenka Renaissance".

He was married to the harpist Ursula Holliger, née Hänggi (1937–2014).

== Music ==
Holliger studied composition with Sándor Veress and Pierre Boulez, and has composed many works in a variety of genres. Many of his works have been recorded for the ECM label. Walter Fink invited him to be the 17th composer featured in the 2007 Komponistenporträt of the Rheingau Musik Festival. There, Holliger conducted music by Claude Debussy and Robert Schumann, alongside performances of his own vocal works, setting Georg Trakl poems, and Gesänge der Frühe, combining Hölderlin texts with quotations from Schumann’s music.

For New Music patron Paul Sacher's 70th birthday, Russian cellist Mstislav Rostropovich asked twelve composers, Sacher's friends, to write music for solo cello using the Sacher hexachord. (This musical cryptogram is eS, A, C, H, E, and Re, or "Sacher" spelled with German words for the pitch classes.) Holliger contributed a chaconne. (Note: The other contributions were Conrad Beck's Drei Epigramme, Luciano Berio's Les mots sont allés ..., Pierre Boulez's Messagesquisse, Benjamin Britten's Tema 'Sacher', Henri Dutilleux's 3 Strophes sur le nom de Sacher, Wolfgang Fortner's Thema und Variationen, Alberto Ginastera's Puneña No. 2, Cristobal Halffter's Variation über das Thema eSACHERe, Hans Werner Henze's Cappriccio, Klaus Huber's Transpositio ad infinitum, and Witold Lutosławski's Sacher-Variation.) Several of the compositions were premiered in Zurich on 2 May 1976. Czech cellist František Brikcius gave the first complete performance of the entire ‘eSACHERe’ project in Prague in May 2011.

== Awards ==
- 1987: Léonie Sonning Music Prize
- 1991: Ernst von Siemens Music Prize
- 1994: The Prince Pierre of Monaco Music Composition Prize for (S)irató
- 2007: Zürich Festival Prize
- 2008: Rheingau Musik Preis
- 2016: Honorary member of the American Academy of Arts and Sciences
- 2017: Robert Schumann Prize of the City of Zwickau
- 2018: Pour le Mérite for Sciences and Arts
- 2022: Robert Schumann Prize for Poetry and Music

== Selected works ==
- Sequenzen über Johannes I,32 (1962) for harp
- Siebengesang (1966–1967) for solo oboe, orchestra, voices and loudspeaker*
- Studie über Mehrklänge (1971) for oboe solo
- String Quartet (1973)
- Scardanelli-Zyklus (1975–1991) for solo flute, small orchestra, tape and mixed choir
- Come and Go / Va et vient / Kommen und Gehen (1976/1977), opera to a text by Samuel Beckett
- Not I (1978–1980) monodrama for soprano and tape
- Lieder ohne Worte (1982–1994), two sets of works for violin and piano
- Präludium, Arioso and Passacaglia, for two guitars (1985)
- Gesänge der Frühe for choir, orchestra and tape, after Schumann and Hölderlin (1987)
- What Where (1988), chamber opera
- Alb-Chehr (1991) for speaker, singers and chamber ensemble
- (S)irató for orchestra (1992–03)
- Fünf Lieder für Altstimme und großes Orchester nach Gedichten von Georg Trakl (1992–2006)
- Violin Concerto "Hommage à Louis Soutter" (1993–1995)
- Schneewittchen (1998), opera based on a text by Robert Walser
- Partita (1999), piano cycle
- Puneigä, ten songs with twelve players after Anna Maria Bacher's poems (2000/02)
- Ma'mounia for percussion solo and instrumental quintet (2002)
- Romancendres for cello and piano (2003)
- Induuchlen, four songs for counter-tenor and horn, for Klaus Huber (2004)
- Toronto-Exercises for flute (also alto flute), clarinet, violin, harp and marimbaphone (2005)
- Lunea (2018), opera based on texts by Nikolaus Lenau

== Discography ==
- Jan Dismas Zelenka: Trio Sonatas (ECM, 1997)
- Sándor Veress: Passacaglia / Songs / Musica Concertante (ECM, 2000)
- Beiseit / Alb-Chehr (ECM, 2000)
- Lauds and Lamentations (ECM, 2003)
