= Anna Pestalozzi-Schulthess =

Swiss educator and philanthropist (1738–1815)

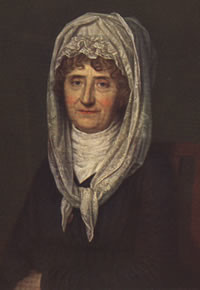
- Born: Anna Schulthess; 9 August 1738; Zürich, Zürich, Switzerland
- Died: 11 December 1815 (aged 77); Yverdon-les-Bains, Vaud, Switzerland
- Occupation: Philanthropist
- Spouse: Johann Heinrich Pestalozzi (m. 1769; died 1815)
- Children: 1

Anna Pestalozzi-Schulthess (9 August 1738 – 11 December 1815) was a Swiss educator and philanthropist, wife of Johann Heinrich Pestalozzi, and financial administrator of the Pestalozzi-Institute. She funded the orphanages and schools of her husband, often being the only financial supporter of his projects.

== Family ==
Anna Pestalozzi-Schulthess was born into the Schulthess family, a wealthy and renowned merchant family which ran a bakery and Konditorei at the Rüdenplatz in Zürich.

Pestalozzi-Schulthess' father, Hans Jakob Schulthess, held an important position the Zunft zur Saffran, Zürich's guild of merchants. As a young man he traveled across Germany, the Netherlands, and France to gain trading skills. Upon inheriting the family business, he expanded it into the spice and drug trades. He was known for his piety, and he attended the religious services of many different Christian sects and organizations to increase his religious knowledge.

Pestalozzi-Schulthess' mother, Anna Holzhalb, was almost completely responsible for the running of the family business in addition to the household. Her responsibility for shopkeeping stemmed from her husband's guild responsibilities, which occupied him from 16:00 into the evening. In addition, she attended fairs and trade shows, a responsibility which usually fell on men. She was a shrewd businesswoman, which put her in conflict with her husband, and caused them to live separately for two years. Most importantly for Pestalozzi-Schulthess, Holzhalb was extremely strict with her children, refusing to acknowledge their independence as they matured. Holzhalb has been described as cold and emotionless, and still beat her daughter at 30 years of age.

== Life ==
=== Early life and courtship ===
Anna Schulthess was born on 9 August 1738, to Hans Jakob Schulthess and Anna Holzhalb. She had five siblings, all younger brothers, with four siblings dying in childhood. She met Johann Heinrich Pestalozzi in 1767 after the sudden death of Johann Kaspar Bluntschli (nicknamed "Menalk"), a mutual friend, of a lung ailment. Menalk had a great impact on Pestalozzi, inspiring him to work hard for social and political progress, but was also a friend of Schulthess. The mutual sorrow after the death of Menalk started secret correspondence between Schulthess and Pestalozzi, which Schulthess maintained despite strong opposition from her parents by having her brother Kaspar transport the letters. Schulthess married Pestalozzi on 30 September 1769 in Gebenstorf. Between 1767 and 1769, the two exchanged 468 letters, equivalent to over 650 pages.

=== Neuhof period ===
In 1770, Pestalozzi borrowed money to purchase 36 hectares of land near Birr to build Neuhof, an agricultural establishment designed as a model of the economic philosophy he had learned from Johann Rudolf Tschiffeli. The site was purposely chosen to be near the meeting place of the Helvetic Society, but the land was unproductive and the farm failed financially in its second year.

In 1774 Neuhof was converted to an industrial school for about 37 impoverished children and 13 impoverished adults. Pestalozzi-Schulthess was responsible for managing the housekeeping and the finances of the facility, the latter of which she greatly supported with her own family wealth. Her experience as a merchant in the family baking and confectionary business aided the financial work. In addition, she taught the girls at Neuhof household skills and spinning. Although it was clear to her that the institution would never see financial success (through the farm or the work of the children), Pestalozzi-Schulthess continued to use her own wealth to support Neuhof until its eventual bankruptcy.

=== Later life ===
Pestalozzi-Schulthess participated in her husband's later educational endeavours, including the orphanage in Stans and the school at Burgdorf. In 1807, she joined Pestalozzi's longest-lasting project, the institute at Yverdon, where she died in 1815. In 1813, two years before her death, she used her inheritance to rescue the institute financially, allowing it to continue teaching for another twelve years until its 1825 closure.

== Descendants ==
Anna Schulthess-Pestalozzi and Johann Heinrich Pestalozzi had one child, Hans Jakob Pestalozzi, nicknamed "Jean Jacques" or "Jacqui" after Jean-Jacques Rousseau. They had at least one grandchild, Gottlieb Pestalozzi, who was able to complete the construction of the manor house at Neuhof after the deaths of his grandparents.
