= List of compositions by Luciano Berio =

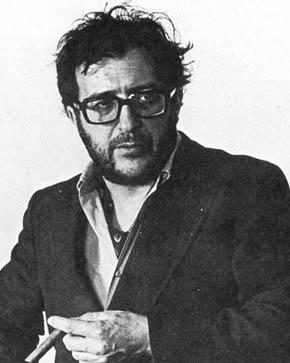
Luciano Berio

List of works by the Italian composer Luciano Berio.

== 1930s ==
- Pastorale for piano (1937)
- Toccata for piano (1939)

== 1940s ==
- Preludio a una festa marina for string orchestra (1944)
- L'annunciazione for soprano and chamber orchestra (1946)
- Due cori popolari for chorus (1946)
- Tre liriche greche for voice and piano (1946)
- O bone Jesu for chorus (1946)
- Due liriche for voice and orchestra (1947)
- Tre canzoni popolari for voice and piano (1947); in 1952 a fourth song is added, changing the title to Quattro canzoni popolari; arrangements of two songs, "Ballo" and "La donna ideale", are incorporated into Folk Songs (1964)
- Tre pezzi for three clarinets (1947)
- Petite suite for piano (1947); published with compositions by Adolfo Berio and Ernesto Berio as Family Album (1947)
- Quintetto for wind quintet (1948)
- Trio for string trio (1948)
- Ad Hermes for voice and piano (1948)
- Suite for piano (1948)
- Due pezzi sacri for two sopranos, piano, two harps, timpani and twelve bells (1949)
- Magnificat for two sopranos, chorus and orchestra (1949)
- Concertino for solo clarinet, solo violin, harp, celesta and strings (1949; revised 1970)

== 1950s ==
- Quartetto for wind quartet (1950)
- Tre vocalizzi for voice and piano (1950)
- El mar la mar for two sopranos and five instruments (1950); reduction for two sopranos and piano (1953); arrangement for soprano, mezzo-soprano and seven instruments (1969).
- Opus no. Zoo for reciter and wind quintet (1951; revised 1971)
- Due liriche di Garcia Lorca for bass and orchestra (1951)
- Deus meus for voice and three instruments (1951)
- Sonatina for wind quartet (1951); withdrawn
- Due pezzi for violin and piano (1951)
- Study for string quartet (1952)
- Quattro canzoni popolari for voice and piano (1952); the Tre canzoni popolari from 1947, with a fourth song added; arrangements of two songs, Ballo and La donna ideale, are incorporated into Folk Songs (1964)
- Cinque variazioni for piano (1953; revised 1966)
- Mimusique No. 1 for tape (1953)
- Chamber Music for female voice accompanied by clarinet, cello, and harp (1953)
- Ritratto di città for tape (1954); in collaboration with Bruno Maderna
- Nones for orchestra (1954)
- Variazione for chamber orchestra (1955)
- Mutazioni for tape (1955)
- Mimusique No.2 for orchestra (1955)
- Quartetto for string quartet (1955)
- Allelujah I for five instrumental groups (1956); reworked as Allelujah II (1958)
- Variazione sull'aria di Papageno for two basset horns and strings (1956)
- Perspectives for tape (1957)
- Divertimento for orchestra (1957)
- Serenata for flute and fourteen instruments (1957)
- Allelujah II for five instrumental groups (1958); reworking of Allelujah I (1956)
- Thema (Omaggio a Joyce) for tape (1958)
- Sequenza I for flute (1958)
- Tempi concertanti for flute, violin, two pianos and ensemble (1959)
- Différences for flute, clarinet, harp, viola, cello and magnetic tape (1959)
- Allez Hop – "racconto mimico" for orchestra (1959; revised 1968); incorporates material from Mimusique No.2 (1955)
- Quaderni I for orchestra (1959)

== 1960s ==
- Momenti for tape (1960)
- Circles for female voice, harp and two percussionists (1960)
- Visage for tape (1961)
- Quaderni II for orchestra (1961)
- Quaderni III for orchestra (1961)
- Epifanie for female voice and orchestra (1961; revised 1965); incorporates Quaderni I–III
- Passaggio – "messa in scena" for soprano, chorus and orchestra (1963)
- Esposizione for voices and instruments (1963); withdrawn; reworked and incorporated in Laborintus II (1965)
- Sequenza II for harp (1963); reused as a solo part in Chemins I (1964)
- Traces for soprano, mezzo-soprano, two actors, chorus and orchestra (1963); withdrawn; parts were reworked and incorporated in Opera (1970)
- Sincronie for string quartet (1964)
- Folk Songs for mezzosoprano and seven instruments (1964); arrangement for mezzosoprano and orchestra (1973)
- Chemins I for harp and orchestra (1964); the harp part is Sequenza II (1963)
- Wasserklavier for 2 pianos (1965); solo version published as the third movement of Six encores (1990)
- Laborintus II for three female voices, eight actors, one speaker and instruments (1965); incorporates a reworked version of Esposizione (1963)
- Rounds for harpsichord (1965); version for piano (1965)
- Sequenza III for solo voice (1966)
- Sequenza IV for piano (1966)
- Gesti for alto recorder (1966)
- Sequenza V for trombone (1966)
- Il combattimento di Tancredi e Clorinda for soprano, tenor, baritone, three violas, cello, double bass, harpsichord (1966); arrangement of the scena by Monteverdi
- Beatles Songs (1965-67): A collection of four arrangements of songs by the popular group in Baroque and neoclassical styles, for voice and small ensemble.
- Sequenza VI for viola (1967); reused as a solo part in Chemins II (1967) and Chemins III (1968)
- Chemins II for viola and nine instruments (1967); the viola part is Sequenza VI (1967); reused in Chemins III (1968)
- O King for mezzosoprano and five instruments (1968); later incorporated into Sinfonia (1968)
- Chemins III for viola, nine instruments and orchestra (1968); the viola part is Sequenza VI (1967), the nine instruments play the same parts as in Chemins II (1967)
- Sinfonia for eight solo voices and orchestra (1968); incorporates O King (1968); the version that premiered in 1968 was in four movements, a fifth was added in 1969
- Questo vuol dire che for three female voices, small chorus, tape and other available resources (1968)
- Sequenza VIIa for oboe (1969); arranged as Sequenza VIIb; reused in Chemins IV (1975)
- Sequenza VIIb for soprano saxophone (1969); arrangement of Sequenza VIIa (1969)
- The Modification and Instrumentation of a Famous Hornpipe as a Merry and Altogether Sincere Homage to Uncle Alfred for flute or oboe, clarinet, percussion, harpsichord, viola, cello (1969); arrangement of music by Henry Purcell
- Air for soprano and orchestra (1969); version for soprano, piano, violin, viola and cello (1970); movement from Opera (1970)
- Chemins IIb for orchestra (1969); reworking of Chemins II (1967); reused in Chemins IIc (1972)

== 1970s ==
- Melodrama for tenor and eight instruments (1970); movement from Opera (1970)
- Opera for ten actors, soprano, tenor, baritone, vocal ensemble, orchestra (1970); includes reworked materials from Traces (1963); two movements, Air (1970) and Melodrama (1970) may be performed separately; revised in 1977 to include Agnus (1971) and E vó (1972)
- Erdenklavier for piano (1970); published as the fourth movement of Six encores (1990)
- Memory for electric piano and harpsichord (1970; revised 1973)
- Autre fois: berceuse canonique pour Igor Stravinsky for flute, clarinet and harp (1971)
- Ora for soprano, mezzosoprano, flute, cor anglais, chorus and orchestra (1971); withdrawn
- Bewegung for orchestra (1971; revised 1984)
- Bewegung II for baritone and orchestra (1971); withdrawn
- Agnus for two sopranos, three clarinets and electric organ (1971); incorporated into the revised version of Opera (1977)
- E vó for soprano and ensemble (1972); incorporated into the revised version of Opera (1977)
- Chemins IIc for bass clarinet and orchestra (1972); Chemins IIb (1969) with an added solo part
- Après Visage for tape and orchestra (1972); withdrawn
- Recital I (for Cathy) for mezzosoprano and eighteen instruments (1972)
- Orchestral arrangement of three songs by Kurt Weill: 1) from the 1934 play Marie Galante, "Le Grand Lustucru" (1967, revised 1972); 2) "Surabaya Johnny" (1972); 3) "Ballad of Sexual Slavery" (1967, revised 1972)
- Concerto for Two Pianos and Orchestra (1973)
- Linea for two pianos, vibraphone and marimba (1973)
- Still for orchestra (1973); withdrawn
- Cries of London for six voices (1974, rev. for eight voices in 1976)
- Eindrücke for orchestra (1974)
- Per la dolce memoria di quel giorno for orchestra and voice (on tape ?) for a ballet by Maurice Béjart (1974)
- Calmo – in memoriam Bruno Maderna for mezzo-soprano and twenty-two instruments (1974)
- "points on the curve to find..." for piano and twenty-two instruments (1974); reworked as Echoing Curves (1988)
- Per la dolce memoria de quel giorno for tape (1974)
- Musica leggera, canone per moto contrario e al rovescio, con un breve intermezzo for flute, viola and cello (1974)
- a-ronne radio documentary for five actors (1974); concert version for eight voices (1975)
- Chemins IV for oboe and eleven string instruments (1975); the oboe part is Sequenza VII (1969); reworked for soprano saxophone and orchestra (2000)
- Chants parallèles for tape (1975)
- Diario immaginario radio piece (1975)
- Sequenza VIII for violin (1976); reused in Corale (1981)
- Fa-Si for organ (1975)
- Quattro versioni originali della Ritirata notturna di Madrid, for orchestra (1975) superimposed and transcribed from the Ritirata by Boccherini
- Coro for forty voices and instruments (1976); extended 1977
- Ritorno degli snovidenia for cello and thirty instruments (1977)
- Les mots sont allés... – "recitativo" for cello (1978)
- Encore for orchestra (1978; revised 1981)
- Scena (1979); incorporated into La vera storia (1981)

== 1980s ==
- Entrata (1980); incorporated into La vera storia (1981)
- Chemins V for clarinet and the 4C digital system, developed by Peppino di Giugno (1980) (Although this was informally performed at IRCAM the piece remained unfinished and was withdrawn. The solo clarinet part was slightly edited and became Sequenza IX.)
- Sequenza IXa for clarinet (1980); drawn from Chemins V (1980); arranged as Sequenza IXb (1980) and Sequenza IXc (1980)
- Sequenza IXb for alto saxophone (1980); arrangement of Sequenza IXa (1980)
- Sequenza IXc for bass clarinet (1980); arrangement Sequenza IXa (1980)
- Accordo for four groups of twenty-seven instruments (1980); the number of players may be multiplied, Berio preferred a total of at least 400 instruments
- La vera storia for soprano, mezzosoprano, tenor, baritone, bass, vocal ensemble and orchestra (1981); incorporates Scena (1979) and Entrata (1980)
- Corale for violin, two horns and strings (1981); the violin part is Sequenza VIII (1975)
- Fanfara for orchestra (1982)
- Duo – "teatro immaginario" for baritone, two violins, chorus and orchestra (1982); study for Un re in ascolto (1984)
- Lied for clarinet (1983)
- Duetti for two violins (1983)
- Un re in ascolto – "azione musicale" with libretto by Italo Calvino (1984)
- Requies for chamber orchestra (1984)
- Voci for viola and orchestra (1984)
- Sequenza X for trumpet and piano resonance (1984)
- Call for two trumpets, French horn, trombone and tuba (1985)
- Terre chaleureuse for wind quintet (1985)
- Luftklavier for piano (1985); published as the fifth movement of Six encores (1990)
- Naturale for viola, percussion and recordings of sicilian folk music (1985)
- Gute Nacht for trumpet (1986)
- Op. 120, No. 1, transcription for orchestra of Johannes Brahms's Clarinet Sonata No. 1, Op. 120 (1986)
- Ricorrenze for wind quintet (1987)
- Formazioni for orchestra (1987)
- Echoing Curves for piano and orchestra (1988); reworking of Points on the curve to find... (1974)
- Sequenza XI for guitar (1988)
- LB.AM.LB.M.W.D.IS.LB for orchestra (1988)
- Ofanìm for two instrumental groups, children's choir, female voice and live electronics (1988; revised 1997)
- Canticum novissimi testamenti for eight voices, four clarinets and saxophone quartet (1989–91)
- Festum for orchestra (1989)
- Psy for solo double bass (1989)
- Feuerklavier for piano (1989); published as the sixth movement of Six encores (1990)
- Continuo for orchestra (1989; revised 1991)

== 1990s ==
- Brin for piano (1990); the first movement of Six encores (1990)
- Leaf for piano (1990); the second movement of Six encores (1990)
- Six Encores for piano (1990); includes Brin (1990), Leaf (1990), Wasserklavier (1965), Erdenklavier (1969), Luftklavier (1985) and Feuerklavier (1989)
- Rendering for orchestra (1990); orchestration of the sketches for Schubert's tenth symphony
- Epiphanies for female voice and orchestra (1991)
- Touch for piano four-hands (1991)
- Canzonetta for piano four-hands (1991)
- Chemins V for guitar and chamber orchestra; the guitar part is Sequenza XI (1992)
- Notturno for string quartet (1993); reworked for string orchestra (1995)
- Rage and Outrage for voices and orchestra (1993); arrangement of songs about the Dreyfus affair
- Compass for piano and orchestra (1994)
- Re-Call for twenty-three instruments (1995)
- Hör for Chorus and Orchestra (1995); prologue of Requiem der Versöhnung, a collaborative work by fourteen composers
- Sequenza XII for bassoon (1995)
- Sequenza XIII – chanson for accordion (1995)
- Outis azione musicale (1995–1996)
- Ekphrasis – continuo II for orchestra (1996)
- Récit – chemins VII for alto saxophone and orchestra (1996)
- Kol Od – chemins VI for trumpet and ensemble (1996); the trumpet part is sequenza X (1984)
- Glosse for string quartet (1997)
- Glossafor clarinet and viola (1997)
- Alternatim for clarinet, viola and orchestra (1997)
- Korót for eight cellos (1998)
- Berceuse per Gyorgy Kurtag, for 4 optional instruments (1998)
- Altra voce for alto flute, mezzo-soprano and live electronics (1999)
- SOLO for trombone and orchestra (1999), dedicated to trombonist Christian Lindberg
- Cronaca del luogo azione musicale (1999)

== 2000s ==
- Interlinea for piano (2000); withdrawn and incorporated in Sonata for piano (2001)
- Sonata for piano (2001)
- Contrapunctus XIX, transcription for orchestra of the final part of J.S. Bachs Die Kunst der Fuge (2001)
- E si fussi pisci for chorus (2002)
- Sequenza XIV for cello (2002) (adaptation for double bass by Stefano Scodanibbio in 2004)
- Stanze for baritone, chorus and orchestra (2003)
