= David Ezra Okonşar =

Turkish–Belgian pianist, composer, conductor, writer and educator

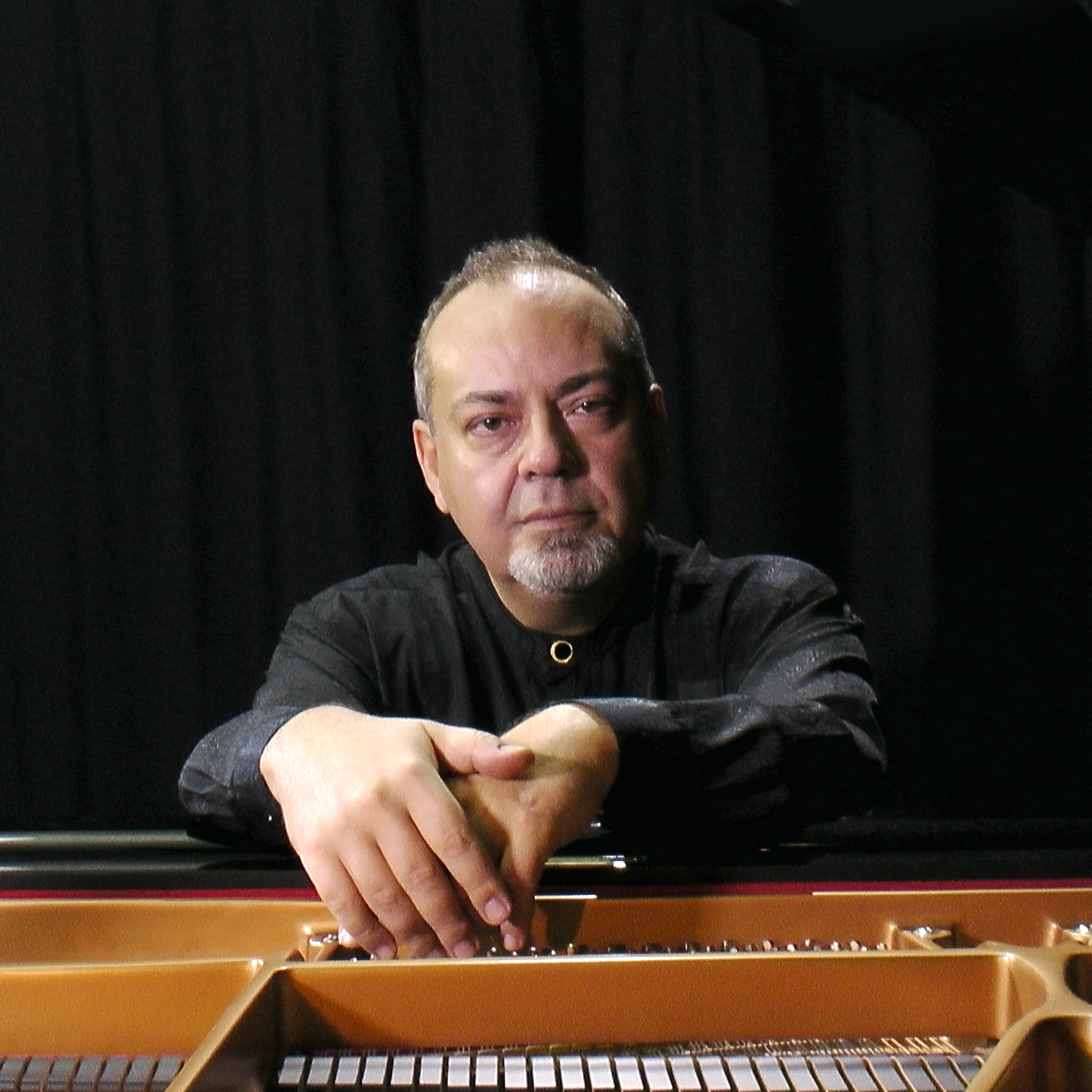
David Ezra Okonşar

David Ezra Okonşar (Turkish pronunciation: [oˈkonʃaɾ]; born 20 October 1961) is a Turkish–Belgian pianist, composer, conductor, writer, and educator. He was previously known as "Mehmet Okonşar".

== Biography ==
David Ezra Okonşar was born in Istanbul (Turkey) with the first name Mehmet, and lived in Paris during his early schooling. He began to study piano at the Hacettepe University Ankara State Conservatory with Nimet Karatekin and Necil Kazım Akses. Thanks to the rich resources the Ankara Conservatory then possessed and the Médiatheque of the Centre Culturel Français d'Ankara, Okonşar grew up studying the music of Pierre Boulez, Edgard Varèse, Olivier Messiaen, and Pierre Schaeffer, composers who would have a strong influence over him.

After about a year-and-a-half studying at the Ankara Conservatory, the family moved to Belgium, where Okonşar entered the class of Jean-Claude Vanden Eynden at the Brussels Royal Conservatory of Music. Vanden Eynden, who was to entirely re-shape the keyboard technique of Okonşar, is a dedicated follower of the style of Eduardo del Pueyo.

The keyboard technique of del Pueyo and Vanden Eynden is based on the work of Marie Jaëll, a pupil of Franz Liszt.

A change of government in Turkey and the political turbulence of 1977 forced the Okonşar family to return to Ankara. Back at the Ankara Conservatory, Okonşar was enrolled in the class of Gülay Uğurata for piano and of Nevit Kodallı for musical composition. Okonşar did not attend either class with much consistency.

During this period, Okonşar was connected on both a friendly and a professional basis with the pianist and conductor Selman Ada. From this friendship, he learned the basics of the keyboard principles of Pierre Sancan, of whom Selman Ada has been a student.

Okonşar's first important recital took place in 1979: the program included Préludes by Messiaen and the Pictures of an Exhibition by Mussorgsky.

Just before the military coup of 1980, the Okonşar family returned to Belgium, where Okonşar resumed studying with Jean-Claude Vanden Eynden. In 1980, Okonşar was awarded the Premier Prix avec Distinction. His program included the Dante Sonata by Liszt. His studies continued after the sudden death of his father with a special scholarship and he was awarded the Diplôme Supérieur de Piano Avec la plus Grande Distinction, Premier Nommé in 1986 by performing the Piano Concerto Op. 42 by Arnold Schoenberg.

At the end of his piano studies, Okonşar had the privilege of working with one of the greatest composers of Belgium: Madame Jacqueline Fontyn. He also studied with a pupil of Messiaen, Claude Ballif. In 1989, he obtained his degrees in Composition-Orchestration from the Royal Conservatory of Music of Brussels.

Alexis Weissenberg, after listening to a recording by Okonşar, invited him to study in Switzerland on a scholarship.

Okonşar accepted Belgian citizenship in 1992, yet at the same time, the president of Turkey, Süleyman Demirel, awarded him the title "State Artist of the Turkish Republic," Okonşar settled in Turkey with his wife, the painter Lale Okonşar.

Okonşar now resides in Turkey, working a busy schedule concertizing, composing, writing, and teaching. He owns and manages a CD label exclusive to his own recordings, LMO-Records, and a publishing company, Inventor-musicæ".

In August 2014, Okonşar took the first names: David Ezra.

== Career ==
Jewish Music – A Concise Study by Mehmet Okonşar

Okonşar's international career began with the first prize at the International Young Virtuoses Competition of Antwerp in 1982. His orchestral début was the Third Concerto by Rachmaninoff performed at the deSingel (Internationale kunstencentrum deSingel) in Antwerp. His other prizes are:

- 1989, Paris, "J. S. Bach" at the Salle Gaveau: second prize
- 1990, Rome, Association Chopin "Premio Etruria": first prize
- 1991, United States, Utah: sixth prize at the "Gina Bachauer International Piano Competition"

The "Académie des Arts Contemporains" of Enghien, Belgium honored Okonşar in 1991 for his acoustic and electronic compositions the Gold and Bronze medals respectively.

Okonşar has performed with the following orchestras: Utah Symphony, deFilharmonie (Royal Flemish Philharmonic), Poznan Philharmonic and Lublin Philharmonic. Some of the conductors he played with include Joseph Silverstein, Charles Dutoit, Sylvain Cambreling, Ingo Metzmacher, and Christof Escher.

In recital, Okonşar has appeared at London's Royal Opera House, the Salle Gaveau in Paris, in New York, San Francisco, Tokyo, Kyoto, Bruxelles, Anvers, Amsterdam (Concertgebouw), Rotterdam, Rome, Athens, Calgary, Salt Lake City, and Ljubljana.

Okonşar's noted concerts included the premiere in Turkey of the Concerto for Piano by Schoenberg and his performances of the Concerto for Piano by Lutoslawski in Poland.

Okonşar has served as a guest judge at the National Piano Competition of Japan under the auspices of the P.T.N.A. (“Piano Teachers National Association”). His research on music and technology was presented in a lecture at the Yamaha headquarters in Hamamatsu, Japan. Okonşar wrote and presented a documentary series on the National Television Broadcast of Turkey, the T.R.T.

Okonşar is a published writer in several music related periodicals in Turkey. His articles in Andante, the most important Turkish periodical on classical music, feature imaginary interviews with "Mephisto" on the subject of the global decadence of the quality of classical music, a subject often worked on by Okonşar. His other published subjects are mainly about musical composition, analysis, and music history. Okonşar also publishes in English and French.

== Repertoire ==
The Art of Fugue by J. S. Bach
Part I (39:52)

Part II (31:01)
Performed by Okonşar on organ and harpsichord

Goldberg Variations by J. S. Bach
Part I – "Aria" to "Variation 9" (11:48)

Part II – Variations 10 to 22 (20:09)

Part III – Variations 23 to 32 (16:04)
Performed by Okonşar on piano.

Okonşar's repertoire encompasses a range from the early 17th century (Fitzwilliam Virginal Book), including among others, Orlando Gibbons and Giles Farnaby, and extends to late 20th century works by Karlheinz Stockhausen and Witold Lutosławski. Notable works in his repertoire include J.S. Bach's The Art of Fugue performed on organ (or piano) and harpsichord, the Goldberg Variations, and The Well-Tempered Clavier.

Okonşar has performed recitals featuring the complete piano works of Arnold Schoenberg, Alban Berg, and Anton Webern. Despite rejecting "musical specialization", his repertoire is heavily modern, including Igor Stravinsky's Three Movements from Petrouchka, the Sequenza IV for piano by Luciano Berio, and the Klavierstücke by Karlheinz Stockhausen.

== Discography ==
Solo piano published by the artist's own, independent label "LMO-Records":

- L. van Beethoven, complete piano sonatas Vol.6. Sonatas op.31 N.3; op.49 N.1 and N.2; op.53 "Waldstein" Audio CD and DVD
- L. van Beethoven, complete piano sonatas Vol.5. Sonatas op.28, op.31 N.1 and N.2 Audio CD and DVD
- L. van Beethoven, complete piano sonatas Vol.4. Sonatas op.22, op.26, op.27 N.1 and N.2 "Moonlight" Audio CD and DVD
- L. van Beethoven, complete piano sonatas Vol.3. Sonatas op.10 N.3, op.13 "Pathétique" and op.14 N.1 and N.2 Audio CD and DVD
- L. van Beethoven, complete piano sonatas Vol.2. Sonatas op.7 and op.10 N.1 and 2. Audio CD and DVD
- L. van Beethoven, complete piano sonatas Vol.1. Sonatas op.2 N.1, 2 and 3. Audio CD and DVD
- D. E. Okonşar, The Royal Crown (Keter Malkhut) Concerto for Theremin and Orchestra
- D. E. Okonşar, Sixteen Short Sonatas for the Solo Piano
- J. S. Bach, The English Suites BWV 806–811 in two volumes
- Jean Philippe Rameau, Complete Keyboard Pieces performed on the piano
- F. Chopin: The Four Scherzos, Four Ballades and Berceuse op.57
- Selections from the Fitzwilliam Virginal Book performed on the piano
- J. S. Bach, The French Suites BWV 812–817 in two volumes
- D. E. Okonşar, Malakhim (Messengers, Angels) Ten Pieces for the Solo Piano
- Clara Wieck/Schumann selected piano works
- J. Brahms Sonata N. 3 in F minor, Op. 5, and Four Ballades, Op. 10
- Sergei Prokofiev, War Sonatas (Piano Sonatas Nos. 6–8) and No. 9 in two volumes
- P. Boulez / I. Xenakis, Selected Pieces for the solo Piano
- D. E. Okonşar: Lamentations, "Eikhah", Symphonic Poem in Five Movements for Grand Orchestra. Audio CD
- D. E. Okonşar: Haazinu, the Song of Moses, seven pieces for the solo piano performed by the composer. Audio CD
- J. S. Bach: Italian Concerto, The Chromatic Fantasie and Fugue and more, performed on the piano. Audio CD
- Rhapsodies Hébraïques, performed by the composer, released on CD & DVD
- Wolfgang Amadeus Mozart: Complete (18) Sonatas for the piano (K. 279–576) in five CD set
- J. S. Bach, The Complete Partitas BWV 825–830 in two-CD set
- Piano Works (1986–2010), performed by the composer
- Last name: BACH: Selected piano works by Carl Philipp Emanuel Bach, Johann Christian Bach and Wilhelm Friedemann Bach (piano)
- Frédéric Chopin: Etudes, complete Op. 10, Op. 25 and "Trois nouvelles études" (piano)
- Joseph Haydn: Last four piano sonatas (piano)
- J. S. Bach: Toccatas (BWV 910–916) (piano)
- Robert Schumann, Fantasie in C major, Op. 17, and the "Études Symphoniques", Op. 13, including the "Five additional etudes", Op. post. published by Johannes Brahms after Schumann's death.
- Liszt – Modern: "Modern" pieces by Franz Liszt, including Fantasy and Fugue on the Theme B-A-C-H, the Bagatelle sans tonalité, etc.
- J. S. Bach: Goldberg Variations (piano)
- J. S. Bach: The Well-Tempered Clavier (piano) (complete, 48 preludes and fugues in 3 CD)
- J. S. Bach: The Art of Fugue (on organ and harpsichord)
- J. S. Bach: The Musical Offering (on electronic instruments)
- "Shadowy Arcade" free improvisations on solo piano

On other labels:

- Live at Salt Lake City: Recital, recorded live (1991). Tempo Müzik, record label discontinued
- Tango, Best Tangos by Piazzolla: personal arrangements for piano solo. Record label: rec-by-saatchi
- Mehmet Okonşar Plays Gershwin, complete works for the solo piano by George Gershwin and a personal transcription of Rhapsody in Blue. Record label: rec-by-saatchi

With other artists:

- T.R.T. Youth Choirs 20th Anniversary, commissioned work by the T.R.T. (Turkish National Radio and Television) for a cappella choir;
- T.R.T. Chamber Orchestra: J.S. Bach, concertos for keyboard in F minor and G minor

Adept of Free Music philosophy Okonşar publishes all his recordings and writings as well as his compositions on the Internet under the GNU GPL or Creative Commons licenses.

== Composer ==
Okonşar started composing at the age of 11. His role-models were Arnold Schoenberg and Pierre Boulez.

His early compositions explore unusual ensembles in an avant-garde mode. During the eighties, atonal (free) Jazz, specially by Cecil Taylor and the intricate voicings of Bill Evans had strong impact on his total serialism. Other extra-serialist influences are Krzysztof Penderecki, Iannis Xenakis, and György Ligeti.

The electronic works created in the fifties and early sixties by Ligeti, Karlheinz Stockhausen, Xenakis, Henri Pousseur and others created a new and previously unheard approach to orchestration. The sound possibilities of the classical orchestra started to be conceptualized by the composers in terms of sound envelopes, sound filters, and formants. Okonşar followed a similar path in his orchestrations in the nineties.

Okonşar's music is structuralist, and calls for an analytical approach. This structuralism is presented in the finished score in a very detailed, complex, and refined musical écriture.

== Compositions ==
- The Royal Crown (Keter Malkhut) Concerto for Theremin and Orchestra
- Sixteen Short Sonatas for the Solo Piano
- Malakhim (Messengers, Angels) Ten Pieces for the Solo Piano
- Lamentations, "Eikhah", Symphonic Poem in Five Movements for Grand Orchestra
- "Haiku's" for cello solo and percussion instruments. Premiered by Nickolai Kolarov and Fernando Meza at the Balkanicus Festival, Minnesota April 2016
- Haazinu (Listen!), the Song of Moses, seven pieces for the solo piano.
- "Rhapsodies Hébraïques" (2014) Free form compositions based on popular Jewish melodies for the piano solo. Dedicated to Robert and Meri Schild.
- "Tehillim – Psalms" (2014) Six pieces for vocal solo and chamber orchestra. Dedicated to Ms. Frances Fenton.
- "Concertango" (2012) Concerto for piano and small orchestra, based on themes by Astor Piazzolla. Dedicated to Mr. Burak Tüzün. Première in Adana (Turkey) by the composer and the Cukurova State Symphony Orchestra, conducted by Mr. Burak Tüzün.
- "Hatikvah" a piano solo arrangement of the theme, released into the Public Domain by the composer
- "Tehillim" for solo vocal (male or female) and small orchestra (2010).
- "Kaleidoscopes" (2006–2009)

N1. for Piano Première by the composer in Ankara
N2. for Strings Chamber Orchestra, Marimba and Piano. Première conducted by Hakan Sensoy in Istanbul
N3. for Viola and Piano. Première by Çetin Aydar (viola) and the composer in Ankara

- "Percussion X" (2005) For three percussionists. Première in Ankara by the Trio SaNeNa.
- "Temples of Kyoto" (2004–2010) Three pieces for the piano,

N1. "Kinkaku-ji" 金閣寺, The Temple of the Golden Pavilion, Première by the composer in Tokyo (dedicated to the memory of Mrs. Yasuko Fukuda)
N2. "Tetsugaku no Michi", Philosopher's Walk 哲学の道
N3. "Ginkaku-ji" 銀閣寺, The Temple of the Silver Pavilion

- Ahmet Taner Kışlalı Anısına (Ahmet Taner Kışlalı In Memoriam) for viola solo (2004)
- "Two Seascapes" (2000) for mixte choir a cappella. Première conducted by Prof. Mustafa Apaydın, Ankara.
- "Rhythm Studies pour Piano Solo" series 2 (2000)
- "Rhythm Studies pour Piano Solo" series 1 (1999), inspired by the "Schillinger System of Musical Composition"
- "Oannés" & "Mr. Dunne" (1990) Two sketches for improvisation for one or several piano(s). Première by the composer in Brussels.
- "Unknown" (1989) for Bass Clarinet and Percussion. Première in Brussels.
- "Mandel Fractal Studies" (1997) Five pieces for the Piano based on fractals.
- "Emulation" (1989) Five Pieces for the Piano. Première by the composer in Istanbul.
- "Chameleon" (1987) Three Pieces for the Piano. Première by the composer in Brussels.
