= Sequenza XIV =

2002 composition by Luciano Berio

- by Luciano Berio
- Composed: 2002
- Dedication: Rohan de Saram
- Published: 2002
- Scoring: cello

Sequenza XIV is a 2002 composition for solo cello by Luciano Berio. It is the last of the Sequenzas, a series of works for solo instruments that he began in 1958 with Sequenza I. Sequenza XIV was inspired by the playing of the cellist Rohan de Saram and the geta bera, a traditional drum he learned to play during his childhood in Ceylon.

== History ==
Luciano Berio began his Sequenza, a series of compositions for solo instruments, in 1958. Each one incorporated extended techniques and transformed traditional elements. According to Tom Service, each piece in the Sequenza series "expanded ... the identity of every instrument from the trombone to the accordion".

From 1979 to 2005, Rohan de Saram was the cellist of the Arditti Quartet, whose repertoire focuses on contemporary music. He played the solo in Berio's Il ritorno degli snovidenia for cello and orchestra in its UK premiere. Berio received a tape of the performance and wrote a letter of appreciation to the cellist. De Saram made an arrangement for cello of Sequenza VI for viola for his own studies. The cellist and the composer then met in 1990, and Berio was so impressed that he requested de Saram to send this arrangement to his publisher, Universal Edition. De Saram played the arrangement in concerts of Sequenza, and also played repeated performances of Il ritorno degli snovidenia, sometimes with Berio conducting.

Sequenza XIV for cello solo was inspired by de Saram's cello playing, as well as his skill with the geta bera, a traditional drum he learned during his childhood. Berio who was interested in the folk instruments and music of other cultures asked de Saram about music from his homeland, requested recordings and help with notations. Sequenza XIV took years to be completed.

De Saram played the premiere in a first version at the Wittener Tage für neue Kammermusik in April 2002. He played a second version in Milan in November that year, and the third and final version in Los Angeles in February 2003. It was published by Universal Edition (UE) in 2002, dedicated to de Saram. He recorded it in 2006.

Double bassist Stefano Scodanibbio reworked the piece for his instrument as Sequenza XIVb, in 2004, which was also published by UE. He recorded it in 2006.

== Music ==
Sequenza XIV takes about 13 minutes to perform. The composition contrasts rhythmic sections inspired by Kandyan drumming and melodic sections. Kandy was the ancient capital of Ceylon, and the Kandyan drum is one of the main instruments of Sri Lanka, played in ceremonies that date back to pre-Buddhist times. In Sequenza XIV, the player drums on the instrument's body with the right hand while the left hand plays on the strings percussively. These sections feature tritones prominently. The work, in its second and third version) begins with a thythmic section, and it returns like a refrain throughout the piece, in all versions appearing towards the end. The sounds were described by Tom Service, reviewer from The Guardian of a concert of the Arditti Quartet playing works by Berio at London's Queen Elizabeth Hall, as delicate, otherworldly and mesmerising.

The melodic sections of the piece use the cello as "a lyrical singing instrument, with almost vocal flexibility and range of expression". Long melodies in a wide range of dynamics and timbres are interspersed with ornamented passages and Bartók pizzicato. In the end, a two-note motif played glissando, marked "ffff, violente & aggressive", alternates with distant extremely soft notes. Service described them as "phrases of achingly lyrical music, dreams of romantic warmth and intimacy", complementing the "energy of the percussive sections".

Sequenza XIV is different from the openly virtuoso pieces in the series for other string instruments, Sequenza VIII for violin and the Sequenza for viola, but it features extended techniques and demands a player of "imaginative perception".

== Recordings ==
When Deutsche Grammophon undertook a project labeled the first complete recording of the Sequenze in 1995, with members of the Ensemble intercontemporain, Sequenza XIV was not yet written. Two recordings of the series including it appeared in 2006, one by Mode Records, with de Saram as the soloist and including the double bass version, and another by Naxos, with mostly Canadian musicians, Darrett Adkins as the cellist.
