= Parrenin Quartet =

The Parrenin Quartet is a French chamber music ensemble for two violons, viola and cello.

== History ==
Created in 1944, it was the resident quartet of radio Luxembourg until 1949. Its extensive repertoire extends from quartets by Haydn to quartets by Schönberg and Bartók. It has been a member of the Domaine musical and the International Music Ensemble of Darmstadt. It has premiered more than 150 works by contemporary authors (Ligeti, Maderna, Boulez, Berio, Britten, Hans Werner Henze, Ohana, Xenakis).

== Members ==
- Jacques Parrenin, first violin
- Marcel Charpentier (1944-1970), Jacques Ghestem (1970-1980), John Cohen (1980-) second violin
- Serge Collot (1944-1957), Michel Walès (1957-1964), Denes Marton (1964-1970), Jean-Claude Dewaele (1970-1980), Gérard Caussé (1980-) viola
- Pierre Penassou (1944-1980), René Benedetti (1980-) cello

== Selected discography ==
- Ravel's String Quartet in F major EMI 1969
- Debussy's String Quartet in G minor op.10 EMI 1976

== Source ==
- Alain Pâris Dictionnaire des interprètes, series Bouquins, Éditions Robert Laffont 1989, p. 1067
