= Rohan de Saram =

British and Sri Lankan cellist (1939–2024)

- De Saram, c. 1990
- Born: 9 March 1939; Sheffield, Yorkshire, England
- Died: 29 September 2024 (aged 85); London, England
- Occupations: Cellist; Academic teacher
- Organization: Arditti Quartet
- Awards: Deshamanya

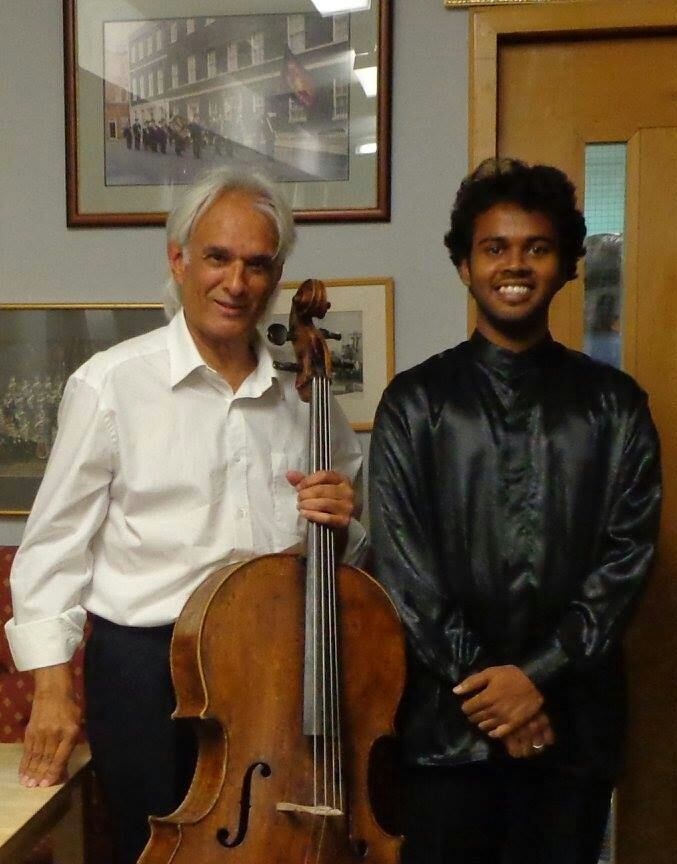
Rohan de Saram (left) with Sulara Nanayakkara

Deshamanya Frank Rohan de Saram (9 March 1939 – 29 September 2024) was a British and Sri Lankan cellist who focused on contemporary music both as a soloist and as the cellist of the Arditti Quartet from 1979 to 2005.

He learned both Western music and Kandyan traditional drumming in Sri Lanka early in life, and studied cello in Italy from age 11, and further in England and with Pablo Casals in Puerto Rico. He began an international career playing in London's Royal Festival Hall (1956) and Wigmore Hall (1959), and Carnegie Hall in New York City in 1960.

De Saram became fascinated with contemporary music in 1972, when he performed Nomos Alpha for solo cello by Iannis Xenakis. He joined the Arditti Quartet in 1977. Both as a soloist and with the quartet he performed world premieres and recorded new music; he collaborated with influential composers, beginning with Kodály, Poulenc and Shostakovich. Several of them composed music for him, such as Luciano Berio's Sequenza XIV.

== Life and career ==
Frank Rohan de Saram was born to Ceylonese parents in Sheffield, Yorkshire, England, on 9 March 1939. His father, Robert de Saram, who trained as a lawyer, and his mother, Miriam Pieris Deraniyagala, a dancer, had met and married in England. His mother had studied voice and violin in London where her father, Sir Paul Pieris-Daraniyagala, was working. Because of World War II, the family moved by ship to their homeland.

=== Childhood in Ceylon ===
The family lived in Colombo, where the father worked as a lawyer. The boy attended the kindergarten of Bishop's College and S. Thomas' College, Mount Lavinia. He grew up with three siblings, Skanda, Druvanand "Druvi" and Niloo. The father was passionate about music, a skilled pianist and interested in composition. His mother, Myra Loos-de Saram had studied piano in Europe. All children received piano lessons from Irene Vanderwall who had qualified at the Royal School of Music in London. Miriam Pieris, whose mother, Lady Hilda Obeyesekere, was also a trained pianist, was interested in Kandyan dance; Rohan also learnt Kandyan traditional drumming.

At the college, Rohan received music instructions from Chaplain Roy Henry Bowyer-Yin who had studied in Cambridge. Yin organised lessons after school, to which Rohan and his brother drove with their father Robert for hours of listening to recordings and discussing with Yin. Martin Hohermann, a Polish refugee who played cello in a jazz band, heard the boy play at a school concert, and gave him cello lessons. Within a year, Rohan played his first public concert, at the Grand Oriental Hotel in 1950 to an audience including Viscount Soulbury and the first prime minister, D. S. Senanayake. Impressed with his progress, his teacher made his mother take him to auditions in Europe.

With letters of recommendation from prominent cellists, Sir George Dyson offered him a scholarship at the Royal College of Music after an audition, and an audition with Pablo Casals in southern France. A former pupil of Casals, the Catalan cellist Gaspar Cassadó heard the boy play when he toured in South Asia, and agreed to teach him free of charge at his residence in Italy, while Casals accepted him for master classes later.

=== Studies abroad ===
From age 11 de Saram studied with Cassadó in Siena and Florence. He met there the violinist Jelly d'Arányi to whom Bartók and Ravel had dedicated compositions, including Tzigane. He worked with composers such as Zoltán Kodály, Francis Poulenc and Dmitri Shostakovich. In 1955 at the age of 16, he was the first winner of the Guilhermina Suggia Award, enabling him to study in the UK with Sir John Barbirolli and in Puerto Rico with Casals. Casals said of him, "There are few of his generation that have such gifts". The following year he won a Harriet Cohen International Music Award.

=== Career as soloist ===
In 1956 De Saram was the soloist at the Royal Festival Hall in Haydn's First Cello Concerto with the National Youth Orchestra. He made his Wigmore Hall debut in 1959, and a reviewer from the Daily Telegraph noted that he was "not only a distinguished artist but a mature one".

At the invitation of Dimitri Mitropoulos, de Saram performed at Carnegie Hall in 1960 with the New York Philharmonic, playing Khachaturian's Cello Concerto conducted by Stanisław Skrowaczewski. The cellist Gregor Piatigorsky presented him with a special bow. He performed with major orchestras in Europe, the US, Canada, Australia and the former Soviet Union with conductors such as Barbirolli, Boult, Colin Davis, Zubin Mehta, Seiji Ozawa, Malcolm Sargent and William Steinberg. From 1972 he lived in London, foremost as a performer, but he also taught at Trinity College of Music. He ventured into contemporary music first when he was requested to play Nomos Alpha for solo cello by Iannis Xenakis for a Dutch broadcaster. He said then in an interview: "It involved learning different techniques and opened up a new world to me."

=== Arditti Quartet ===
From 1979 to 2005, de Saram was a member of the Arditti Quartet, but kept working with other artists to pursue his own artistic vision. He also toured and recorded with Markus Stockhausen's "Possible Worlds" group. He played the standard classical cello works, including the great concertos, sonata cycles and Bach's six Cello Suites. He worked with composers Luciano Berio, John Cage, Elliott Carter, Philip Glass, Sofia Gubaidulina György Ligeti, Wolfgang Rihm, Sir William Walton and Xenakis. During his time with the Arditti Quartet, they received both the Ernst von Siemens Music Prize for their services to music and a Grammy Award for works by Elliott Carter.

=== Contemporary music ===
In ensemble or as a soloist, he premiered works by Berio, Bose, Benjamin Britten, Sylvano Bussotti, Sir Peter Maxwell Davies, Paul Hindemith, Mauricio Kagel, Ligeti's Racine 19, Conlon Nancarrow, Henri Pousseur, Jeremy Dale Roberts (Deathwatch Cello Concerto, written for de Saram), Alfred Schnittke, Xenakis's Kottos and Toshio Hosokawa (the concerto Chant for cello and orchestra). De Saram was the cellist in the world premiere of Karlheinz Stockhausen's Helikopter-Streichquartett in 1995.

Berio was so impressed by de Saram's performance of his Il ritorno degli snovidenia that he wrote Sequenza XIV specially for the cellist, published in 2002, incorporating drumming on the body of the cello drawn from de Saram's skills with the Kandyan drum. The work was given its world and numerous national premieres by de Saram who then also made the premiere recording.

De Saram often played in duo with his brother, pianist Druvi de Saram. They played on stage and in recordings, notably Prabandha which John Mayer composed for them. De Saram founded the De Saram Clarinet Trio. He was one of relatively few new music interpreters who also improvised. From roughly 1986 to 1994, he occasionally worked with the UK improvising ensemble AMM, appearing on their recording "The Inexhaustible Document", recorded in 1987. He took part in the 2008 Heidelberg Biennale focused on Neue Musik und Improvisation (New music and improvisation). He also formed a duo with the Indonesian pianist and composer Ananda Sukarlan that lasted a few years starting in 2004, premiering works by Naresh Sohal and some Spanish composers such as Jesus Rueda and Santiago Lanchares.

=== Recordings ===
De Saram made numerous recordings, both with the Arditti Quartet and as a soloist. He recorded Antonio Vivaldi's cello sonatas and Bach's Cello Suites. A reviewer of a 2016 set of all suites described his playing as "mature, considered, confident, compelling and revealing", with "a delightful freshness and spontaneity throughout".

De Saram recorded Edmund Rubbra's Soliloquy for cello and orchestra, John Mayer's Ragamalas and Prabhanda, Xenakis' Kottos, Elliott Carter's Figment I and II, and works by Bernd Alois Zimmermann, Peter Ruzicka, Gelhaar, Pröve and Steinke. His 2011 releases include Harmonic Labyrinth with Preethi de Silva, and the first of two volumes of de Saram in Concert featuring Wigmore Hall performances of Kodaly's Sonata for Solo Cello (his score carries Kodaly's hand-written praise for his performance before the composer in May 1960), together with Rachmaninoff's Cello Sonata, in which he is accompanied by his brother Druvi. He recorded Britten's Cello Suites, and a reviewer from Gramophone noted his "scrupulous attention to matters of dynamic gradation and tone colour" and described his interpretation as of "a distinctive character and a powerful dramatic impact" delivering "musical insights". Reviewer Andrew Clements from The Guardian wrote that he offered a brisk approach but never neglected details or subtleties.

=== Personal life ===
After de Saram's first marriage was dissolved, he married Rosemary de Saram in 1972. They lived in London from that year. Their daughter Sophia became a doctor; she is also an amateur cellist. Their son Suren is a percussionist, drummer of the Bombay Bicycle Club.

De Saram died after a short illness on 29 September 2024, at the age of 85.

== Honours ==
In December 2004, de Saram was awarded an honorary doctorate of letters from the University of Peradeniya, Sri Lanka. In December 2005 he received the Deshamanya, a Sri Lankan national honour, given by the President of Sri Lanka.
