= Pablo Gómez =

Pablo Gómez or Pablo Gomez may refer to:

- Pablo S. Gomez (1931–2010), Filipino fantasy writer
- Pablo Gómez Álvarez (born 1946), Mexican politician
- Pablo Gómez (footballer) (born 1970), Spanish football manager and former midfielder
- Pablo Hernán Gómez (1977–2001), Argentine football striker
- Pablo Leandro Gómez (born 1997), Argentine football winger
- Pablo Gómez (guitarist), Mexican guitarist
- Pablo Gómez Niada, Chilean lawyer
- Pablo Gómez Cora (born 1976), Argentine rugby union player
