= Serge Collot =

French violist and music educator (1923–2015)

Serge Collot (French: [sɛʁʒ kɔlo]; 27 December 1923 – 11 August 2015) was a French violist and music educator.

== Biography ==
Born in Paris, Collot studied viola at the Conservatoire de Paris with Maurice Vieux, chamber music with Joseph Calvet, and composition with Maurice Hewitt and Arthur Honegger. He won first prizes in viola (1944) and chamber music (1949).

Collot was a member of the Parrenin Quartet, Radiodiffusion Française String Quartet, and Bernède Quartet. In 1960 he founded Le Trio à Cordes Français with violinist Gérard Jarry and cellist Michel Tournus. The ensemble performed together for 32 years. From 1957 to 1986 he was Principal Violist with the Orchestra of the Paris Opera.

Collot served as Professor of Viola for twenty years (1969–1989) at the Conservatoire de Paris. Many contemporary violists have been his students: Pierre-Henri Xuereb, Jean Sulem (who succeeded him at the Conservatoire in 1989), Émile Cantor, Jacques Borsarello, Laurent Verney, Jean-Paul Minali Bella.

An exponent of contemporary music, Collot performed in Pierre Boulez's Domaine Musical concerts until 1970 and has inspired many compositions for viola including Quatre Duos for viola and piano (1979) by Betsy Jolas and, in particular, the Sequenza VI for viola solo (1967) by Luciano Berio. He has performed and lectured internationally and has served on juries of music competitions including those in Geneva and Munich.

Collot was made a Chevalier of the Légion d'honneur in 1989. His life was the subject of a 2002 documentary film entitled L'ouvrage de Serge Collot and directed by Dominique Pernoo.

Collet played a 1741 viola by David Tecchler once owned and played by Théophile Laforge. He died at the age of 91 in Gerzat on 11 August 2015.

== Discography ==
Viola

- Art of the Viola – Serge Collot (viola); Keiko Toyama (piano); Aurèle Nicolet (flute); Ayako Shinozaki (harp); Camerata 462 (1997), Camerata 462 (2002)

Robert Schumann: Märchenbilder for viola and piano, Op. 113 (1851)
Mikhail Glinka: Sonata in D minor for viola and piano
Claude Debussy: Sonata for flute, viola and harp (1915)
Darius Milhaud: Sonata No. 2 for viola and piano, Op. 244 (1944)

- Contemporary Viola – Serge Collot (viola); Adés 16.002 (1970s)

Luciano Berio: Sequenza VI for viola solo
André Jolivet: 5 Églogues for viola solo
Paul Hindemith: Sonata for viola solo, Op. 25 No. 1

- Betsy Jolas: Points d'aube for viola and 13 wind instruments; Serge Collot (viola); Marius Constant (conductor); Ensemble Ars Nova; Adés 205 762 (1978, 1996)
- André Jolivet: Concertos and Chamber Works – 5 églogues for viola solo; Serge Collot (viola); Accord 476 7783 (2005)
- Robert Schumann: Contes de Fées (Fairy Tales) – Serge Collot (viola); Béatrice Berne (clarinet); Julie Guigue (piano); Polymnie POL 390 231

Märchenbilder for viola and piano, Op. 113 (1851)
Märchenerzählungen for clarinet, viola and piano, Op. 132 (1853)

Chamber music

- Jacques Ibert (1890–1962) – String Quartet (1937–1942); Parrenin Quartet; Ades 20346 (1990)
- Shin'ichirō Ikebe: Lion – Camerata 270 (1999)

Quinquevalence for violin, viola, cello, double bass and piano (1991); Takumi Kubota (violin); Serge Collot (viola); Masaharu Kanda (cello); Yoshio Nagashima (double bass); Tomoko Mukaiyama (piano)
Strata I for string quartet (1988); Mitsuko Ishii, Hiroaki Ozeki (violins); Serge Collot (viola); Masaharu Kanda (cello)

- Teizo Matsumura: Courtyard of Apsaras – String Quartet (1996) – Sonoko Numata, Saschko Gawriloff (violins); Serge Collot (viola); Christoph Henkel (cello); Camerata 617 (2001)
- Georges Onslow: String Quartet, Op. 8 No. 1; String Quintet, Op. 78 No. 1 – Gérard Jarry; Yvon Caracilly; Serge Collot; Bruno Pasquier; Michel Tournus

== Sources ==
- Riley, Maurice W. (1991), "Brief Biographies of Violists", The History of the Viola, Volume II, Ann Arbor, Michigan: Braun-Brumfield, p. 371.
