= Coro (Berio) =

Composition by Luciano Berio

- by Luciano Berio
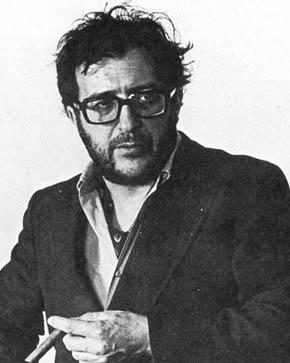
- Luciano Berio, at the time of the composition.
- Composed: 1974–1976
- Published: Ricordi
- Duration: Approximately one hour
- Movements: 31
- Scoring: 40 voices and 40 instruments

Premiere
- Date: 24 October 1976
- Location: Donaueschingen Festival
- Conductor: Luciano Berio
- Performers: WDR Rundfunkorchester Köln; WDR Rundfunkchor Köln

Coro (Italian: Chorus) is a large scale composition for forty voices and forty instruments by Italian composer Luciano Berio.

== Composition ==
Coro was written at a time when, according to Berio, "the blood in the streets of Italy came out", partly due to the Years of Lead. Berio, a composer committed to social issues, often expressed his views and described the composition's central theme to be "the acute awareness of things at a tragic moment. On this line, he referred to Coro as being a tribute to Chilean poet Pablo Neruda. In his opinion, Neruda was "practically murdered (not physically, but spiritually); they broke his heart. [...] It is an invitation to be aware of the violence of the times, Fascist violence".

Berio composed Coro between 1974 and 1976 under a commission by the Westdeutscher Rundfunk Köln. It was dedicated to his wife, Talia Berio. Its premiere took place at the Donaueschingen Festival on 24 October 1976 by the WDR Rundfunkchor Köln and the WDR Rundfunkorchester Köln. However, Berio only premiered an initial version of Coro, which contained 29 movements. The final 31-movement piece was later premiered in Graz, on 16 November 1977, by the Vienna Radio Symphony Orchestra and Chorus, conducted by Leif Segerstam.

As is customary in Berio's musical output, Coro has its place in a sequence of works whose titles refer to archetypal modes of musical expression. He started this sequence with his Sinfonia (1968–1969), followed by his outlook on the whole genre of music theatre in Opera (1960–1970), on the life and work of a solo singer in Recital I (for Cathy) (1972) and on the relationship between soloists and ensembles in his Concerto for Two Pianos and Orchestra (1972–1973). With Coro, Berio also further explored the kind of folk music he had already used in his Folk Songs (1964) and Questo vuol dire che (1969).

== Structure ==
Coro is divided into 31 untitled movements of varying duration and takes around an hour to perform. Following is a full breakdown of the movements, with their duration as specified by Berio in the original score.

Structure of Coro by Luciano Berio
Movement	Incipit	Duration	Tempo
1	"Today is mine. I claimed to a man"	—	♩ = 60 (ma sempre molto flessible)
2	"Venid a ver"	1:25	♩ = 64
3	"Your eyes are red"	0:30	♩ = 114
4	"Venid a ver"	0:06	♩ = 104
5	"Your eyes are red"	1:30	♩ = 84
6	"Venid a ver la sangre por las calles"	0:20	♩ = 104
7	"Wake up, woman, rise up, woman"	1:40	♩ = 104
8	"Venid a ver la sangre por las calles"	—	♩ = 72
9	"I have made a song"	—	♩ = 72
10	"Venid a ver la sangre por las calles"	—	♩ = 68
11	"I have made a song"	2:05	♩ = 84
12	"Venid a ver la sangre"	0:30	♩ = 84
13	"Wake up, woman, rise up, woman"	—	♩ = 96
14	"Venid a ver la sangre"	0:35 ca.	♩ = 60
15	"Komm in meine Nähe"	0:30	♩ = 60
16	"Today is mine. I claimed to a man"	2:10	♩ = 84
17	"Pousse l'herbe et fleurit la fleur"	1:15	♩. = 84
18	"Go, my strong charm"	—	♩ = 116
19	"It is so nice, a nice one gave a sound"	1:35	♪ = 160
20	"Your eyes are red"	—	♩ = 94
21	"Mirad mi casa muerta"	—	♩ = 74
22	"Je m'en vais où ma pensée s'en va"	—	♩ = 72
23	"Pousse l'herbe et fleurit la fleur"	1:20	𝅗𝅥 = 68
24	"Oh, issa, oh, issalo in alto"	1:35	♩ = 84
25	"Oh, isselo in alto"	—	♩ = 94
26	"Come ascend the ladder"	—	♩ = 72
27	"When we came to this world"	—	♩ = 60
28	"El día oscila rodeado"	—	♩ = 72–60
29	"Hinach yafà raayatí"	—	♩ = 84
30	"El día pálido se asoma"	—	♩ = 74
31	"Spin, colours, spin"	—	♩ = 60

=== Text ===
The distinction between individual and mass music is also made clear in the use of two different kinds of text. On the one hand, Berio turned to folk poetry in various languages for the solo episodes. These folk utterances are often translated from a wide range of languages and dealt with very different topics, from love and death to the oneness between man and nature. All of these songs are authorless. For example, the initial episode in which a soprano is gradually joined by four other sopranos and five contraltos is based on an American Indian text, "Today is mine".

On the other hand, Berio used a different textual source for mass episodes, which is taken from a work by Chilean author Pablo Neruda. Here, the process is reversed: whereas in the previous episodes the poetry from different peoples are assigned to individual singers, in the case of Neruda, his poetry is here sung by all forty singers in the massive tuttis which are the pillars of this piece. Only a few fragments are taken from the poet's three-volume Residencia en la tierra (1933–1947). The most recurring cry in the piece, "Venid a ver la sangre por las calles" ("Come and see the blood in the streets"), is taken from the final verses of one of the poems included in this collection, entitled Explico algunas cosas ("A few things explained"). This cry appears many times throughout the piece as a refrain without any context whatsoever.

Since Coro tends to be something different especially for singers because they are soloists most of the time (given the fact that the large number of voices often calls for a choir and not solo performers), it is generally psychologically new and often challenging. Probably to make things simpler, Berio decided to use a wide range of texts in very different —and, often, little-known— languages; however, most of the texts in African, Iranian, and American languages are generally translated into German. Berio only used five different languages: French, Spanish, Italian, English, and German.

=== Scoring and on-stage distribution ===
Coro is scored for forty voices and forty instruments, namely, a chorus of 10 sopranos, 10 altos, 10 tenors and 10 basses, four flutes (flutes three and four doubling piccolos), an oboe, an English horn, a piccolo clarinet in E♭, two clarinets in B♭, a bass clarinet in B♭, an alto saxophone, a tenor saxophone, two bassoons, a contrabassoon, three trumpets in F, four French horns in C, three trombones, a bass tuba, a tenor tuba, an electric organ, a piano, a large percussion section played by two percussionists consisting in five cowbells, six tom-toms, ten tam-tams, a snare drum, a set of chimes, a pair of castanets, two guiro, two set of sleigh bells, maracas, two pairs of zills, a ratchet, three woodblocks, two bongos, a bass drum, a tambourine and a glockenspiel and, finally, three violins, four violas, four violoncelli, and three double basses.

Although the work is largely based on folk material, Berio used no direct quotations or transformations of actual folk songs, aside from movement 6, where he used a Croatian melody, and movement 16, where he quoted a melody from his own Cries of London. Berio used, in addition to this folk element, a wide range of musical avant-garde techniques. He divided the piece into 31 "self-contained and often contrasting episodes" and made clear that the same piece of text is used in several different parts of the piece with different music, whereas the same musical model can also occur several times with different texts. To the end of enhancing acoustical and visual interactions among voices and instruments, he envisaged a very specific placing of the singers and instruments on the stage, with a singer each sitting next to an instrumentalist of roughly comparable timbre and range, forming a semicircle. According to Berio, the harmonic level is perhaps the most important one, since it is the work's base but is at the same time its environment and its slowly changing landscape.

This was not the first time Berio decided to place instrumentalists together with singers: he also did this in his Sinfonia and Labyrinth, to name a few works, as one of his major preoccupations in musical composition was creating an acoustic unity among all instruments and voices. Berio himself cited "different levels of understanding" as one of the most important traits of his work, as he stated that the range of complexity varied widely along the whole composition, going from African musical techniques to complex, avant-garde techniques. On the way listeners should understand this piece, he commented:

There is every way of listening: you may listen to a Mozart symphony only in terms of melody. That's poor, but it's there, you can do it. Of course the deeper you go, the more you are rewarded. So here there is a simpler level of perception, then it is more complex. It's one of the great privileges of music that there is a certain complexity of perception: the Grosse Fuge is complex. But then you can generate simpler levels.

— Luciano Berio

== Reception ==
Both Berio and renowned conductor Lorin Maazel have stated that one of the main challenges in Coro is the balance in sounds and, more specifically, in voices, arguing that "it sounds better in a hall". Because of this, both conductors were very critical of recordings, claiming that the rewarding experience of listening to the freshness of sounds is often destroyed, and no sense of distribution can be made when listening to a recorded version of the piece.
