= Sequenza VII =

Composition for oboe by Luciano Berio

- by Luciano Berio
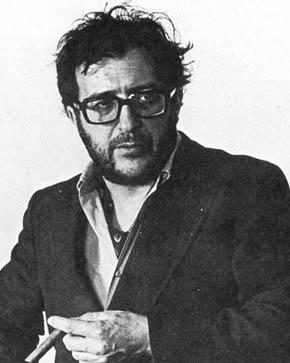
- Luciano Berio, around the time of the composition
- Genre: Serialism
- Related: Chemin IV
- Composed: 1969
- Scoring: oboe

Sequenza VII (composed 1969) is a composition for solo oboe by Luciano Berio, the seventh of his fourteen Sequenze. The sequenza calls for extended technique. In 1975, Berio used Sequenza VII as part of Chemins IV, which included an orchestra of eleven string instruments. In 1993, Claude Delangle adapted the work for soprano saxophone, naming the revised work Sequenza VIIb.

Sequenza VII was written for Heinz Holliger.

== Background ==
Sequenza VII was written in 1969, just after Berio composed his Sinfonia. At that time, Berio tended to reject traditional musical notation in a manner similar to Earle Brown or Christian Wolff. Like his other sequenzas, Berio meant for Sequenza VII to be played by a virtuoso who was not only proficient technically but who had a "virtuosity of the intellect" as well.

== Structure and analysis ==
The piece is built around a drone played on a B natural, which typically comes from an offstage source. In his instructions on the score, Berio writes,

a B natural must sound throughout the piece. The sound-source should preferably not be visible. This can be an oscillator, a clarinet, a pre-taped oboe, or something else. The intensity should be kept to a minimum with quite small variations. The B natural should give the impression of lending a slight resonance to the oboe.

For much of the piece, Berio notates measures in seconds instead of bars, although there are some sections of the work that use traditional rhythmic notation. The piece calls for various forms of advanced and extended technique, including using five alternate fingerings for one note in a single measure, multiphonics, double tonguing, trills on multiple notes at a time, overblowing, flutter-tonguing, traditional harmonics, and microtonal trills.

Jacqueline Leclair breaks down the piece into three sections. The first section goes from measure 1 to measure 92, and is primarily written in temporal notation, leading it to have a "free or improvisatory" quality. The second section goes from measure 92 to measure 121, and it alternates between temporal and rhythmic notation. Leclair argues that the beginning and end of the section are "very similar to the beginning and end of the piece" and that the middle part of it is "the most sustained and calmest section of Sequenza VII. The third and final section lasts from measures 121 to 169. According to Leclair, it contains the climax of the work, and the part after the climax "can be thought of as a large-scale ritardando or calming front he first 2 sections' much more frenetic character."

A strict interpretation of Berio's markings would make the piece be just under seven minutes, but performance times can vary, with the dedicatee, Heinz Holliger, performing it in between eight and eight and a half minutes.

== Adaptations ==
In 1975, Berio himself adapted Sequenza VII into a short oboe concerto for oboe and eleven string instruments, titled Chemins IV. Berio's Chemins series took several sequenzas and placed them in orchestral settings in order to give "a commentary organically tied to it and generated by it." Berio himself described Chemins IV as a commentary on and development of the original sequenza:

Chemins IV, for oboe and eleven strings, can be listened to as a commentary to my Sequenza VII for oboe (1969), a commentary that amplifies and develops certain harmonic aspects of the original Sequenza. The Sequenza becomes in fact the generator of new instrumental lines, which in turn make explicit its latent polyphony around a pivot – an ever-present B – that puts into perspective all the subsequent harmonic transformations. Like a reverberating chamber, the development of Chemins IV mirrors and shatters the elements of Sequenza VII, sometimes receiving their anticipated echo in such a way that for the listener the oboe part seems generated by the eleven strings.

In 1993, saxophonist Claude Delangle adapted Sequenza VII for soprano saxophone, naming the revised work Sequenza VIIb. The piece was premiered on May 20, 1993, at the Conservatoire de Strasbourg. The adaptation was included on Naxos Records's complete recording of the sequenzas, and Delangle also adapted Chemins IV for solo soprano saxophone, titling it Chemins IVb. Berio enjoyed the soprano saxophone adaptation more than the original oboe version and planned to revise the original version, but he was unable to do so before his death in 2003. In 2000, oboist Jacqueline Leclair published a new "supplementary" edition of the sequenza, retitled Sequenza VIIa in light of the soprano saxophone adaptation. The edition includes the original and an edited version by Leclair.
