= Sequenza II =

Composition for harp by Luciano Berio

- by Luciano Berio
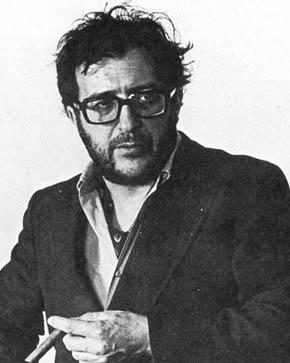
- Related: Chemin I
- Composed: 1963
- Dedication: Francis Pierre
- Scoring: harp

Sequenza II is a composition for unaccompanied harp by Luciano Berio. Written for and premiered by the French harpist Francis Pierre in 1963 (who also recorded it twice), it has since been performed and recorded by Emily Laurance, Frédérique Cambreling, Susan Jolles, and Claudia Antonelli, among others. The piece is about seven to eight minutes.

As with most of the Sequenze, Berio sought to explore the timbral and expressive capabilities of the harp in the hands of a virtuoso musician. Because of this, Sequenza II defies many of the stereotypes associated with the harp. In the liner notes of the 1999 Ensemble InterContemporain recording, Berio wrote of Sequenza II, "French impressionism has left us with a rather limited version of the harp, as if its most obvious characteristic were that of lending itself to the attention of loosely robed girls with long blond tresses, capable of drawing from it nothing more than seductive glissandi." Sequenza II has its share of glissandi, but also calls for harmonic tones and extended techniques such as percussive effects (on the wooden body of the harp), as well as a virtuoso amount of pedal-shifting and an extreme sensitivity to rapid dynamic changes.

== Analysis ==
Sequenza II is built from the decorative figurations, glissandi, octave effects, and other characteristic devices of the harp, working with rather than against the instrument's inherent limitations. Its structure involves the interaction of two musical characters, the linear (i.e. melody, counterpoint) and the vertical (i.e. chords, percussion), with the second gradually superseding the first. It begins with a single, repeated note. This expands into a single melodic line, then turns to two-part counterpoint and accelerates into a series of rapid melodic ostinati contrasted with glissandi and seven-note tone clusters. The chords gradually become more differentiated and the last remnants of the original melodic style disappear (Hopkins 1966).

In 1964, Berio composed Chemins I by adding an orchestra to Sequenza II.

== Discography ==
- Berio, Luciano. 1965. Circles, Sequenze I, II, III. (including Francis Pierre, harp). LP recording, 1 disc: 33⅓ rpm, stereo 30 cm. Studio-Reihe Neuer Musik. Wergo WER 60021. Mainz: Wergo.
- Berio, Luciano. 1970. Sequenza II, with works by Ives, Bolcom, Pousseur, and Bussotti. (Performers include Francis Pierre, harp). Modern Music Series. LP recording, 1 disc: 33⅓ rpm. stereo, 30 cm. Philips 839.322 DSY. [Netherlands]: Philips, 1970.
- La Nouvelle Harpe. 1981 Berio: Sequenza II, and works by Tôn Thât Tiêt, Betsy Jolas, Yoshihisa Taira, Alain Bancquart and Patrick Marcland. Marie-Claire Jamet, harp. Musique Française d'Aujourd'hui Series. LP recording, 1 disc: 33⅓ rpm, stereo, 30 cm. Erato STU 71 160 [France]: Erato, 1981.
- New Music Series Volume 2. 1989. Berio: Sequenza II, and works by Roger Reynolds, Gordon Stout, Giacinto Scelsi, Brian Ferneyhough, and Robert Cogan. (Performers include Emily Laurance, harp). CD recording, 1 disc: digital, stereo, 12 cm.. Neuma 450–72. Acton, MA: Neuma Records.
- Berio, Luciano. 1999. Sequenzas. Ensemble InterContemporain (including Frederique Cambreling, harp). Deutsche Grammophon. 3 CDs.
- Harp XX. 1999. Claudia Antonelli, harp. Berio: Sequenza II, with works by Hindemith, Krenek, Tailleferre, Britten, Petrassi, and Bussotti. CD recording, 1 disc: stereo, 12 cm. Arts 47532–2. [Reisen], Germany: Arts Music.
- Berio, Luciano. 2006. The Complete Sequenzas, Alternate Sequenzas and Works for Solo Instruments. various performers (including Susan Jolles, harp). New York: Mode Records. 4 CDs, Mode 161/3.
