= Sequenza III =

1965 composition by Luciano Berio

- by Luciano Berio
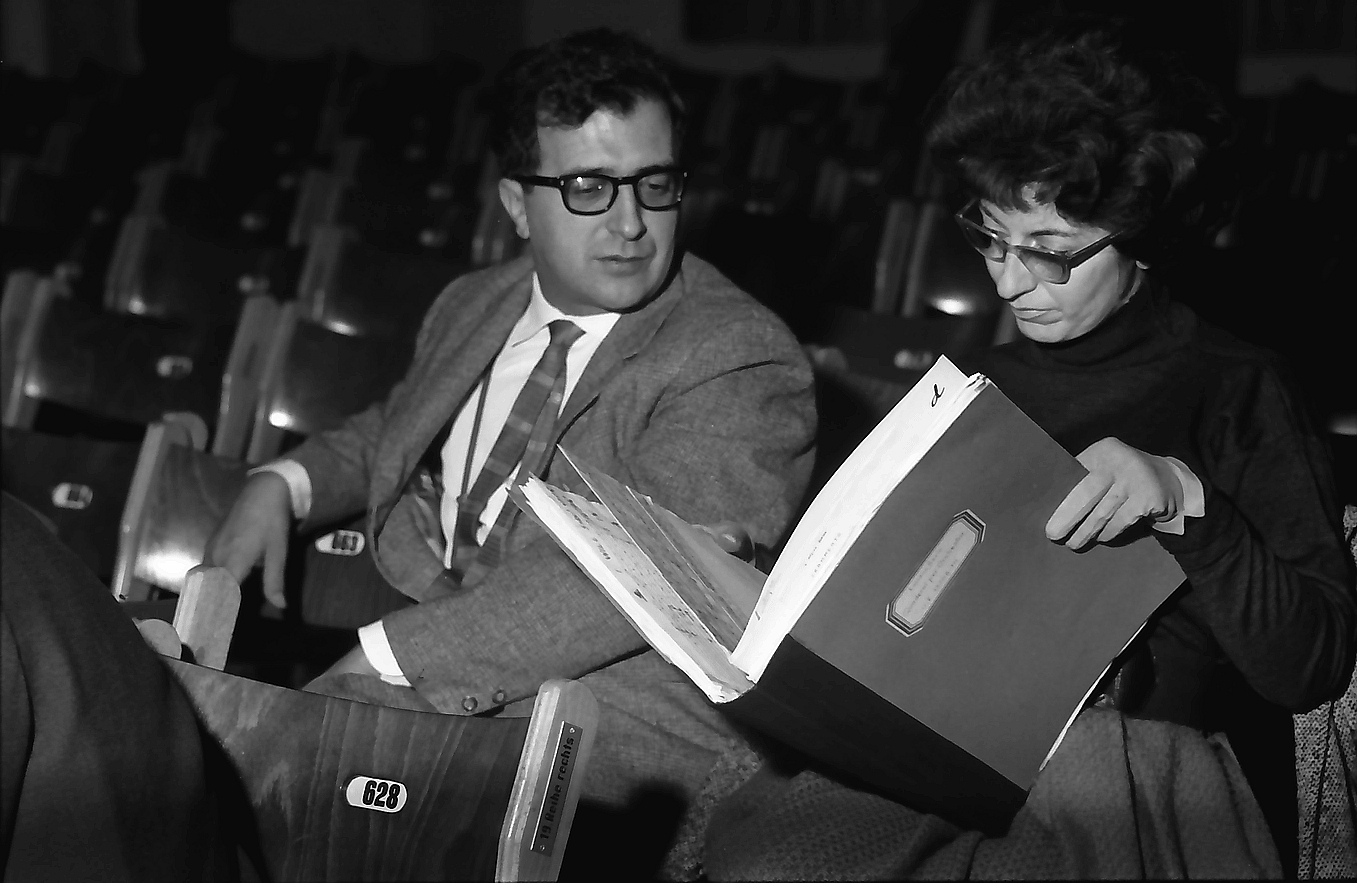
- Berio and Berberian at the Donaueschingen Festival, 1962
- Text: by Markus Kutter
- Language: English
- Composed: 1965
- Dedication: Cathy Berberian
- Published: 1966
- Scoring: solo female voice

Sequenza III is a 1965 composition for a solo female voice by Luciano Berio, part of Sequenza, a series of works for solo instruments begun in 1958. Sequenza III was inspired by the virtuoso voice of Berio's former wife, Cathy Berberian. Berio set a short text in English by Markus Kutter, partly fragmented into words, syllables and sounds of vowels and consonants. He used the voice not only for singing but many other vocal sounds, creating a form of musical theatre. The work was first performed by Berberian in 1966 and published by Universal Edition the same year.

== History ==
Luciano Berio began his Sequenza series of compositions for solo instruments in 1958, with Sequenza I. Each piece in the series incorporated extended techniques and transformed traditional elements.

Sequenza III for female voice was inspired by the voice of Cathy Berberian who was his wife from 1950 to 1964; they retained a professional relationship. Berio set a short English text by Markus Kutter. He completed the composition in 1965.

She performed the premiere in Bremen in 1966. The work was published by Universal Edition (UE) in 1966, dedicated to Berberian as "to Cathy".

== Music ==
Sequenza III takes about 8 minutes to perform. The text is fragmented into words and further into syllables and sounds of vowels and consonants. The composer used the voice not only for singing, making the piece a form of musical theatre. He marked 15 vocal techniques such as "salvoes of laughter" and "tongue-trill against the upper lip" and 44 agogic expressions such as "dreamy", "ecstatic" and "fading away". A reviewer described it as a "solo roller coaster" in which "scraps of words and breathing exercises are contrasted like in a vocal comic; in this music-theatrical show-piece, raging coloraturas, laughter and coughing attacks swirl together". Humming, speaking, whispering, breathing and mouth sounds are combined with "singing that is driven to exaltation". Performance instructions lead to a scenic quality including mimic, hand and body movements, "perceived as imaginary theatre".

== Recordings ==
Berberian performed Sequenza III in the US in 1969 for a collection of Berio's works that also contained Sequenza VII for oboe, played by dedicatee Heinz Holliger, and pieces played by members of the Juilliard Ensemble when Berio was teaching at members of the Juilliard School. It was recorded as part of Deutsche Grammophon's first complete recording of the Sequenze in 1995, with members of the Ensemble intercontemporain. It was recorded in two 2006 complete recordings of the series, one by Naxos with mostly Canadian musicians, performed by Tony Arnold, and by Mode Records, performed by Isabelle Ganz. Lucile Richardot recorded it in 2021 a collection of vocal works by Berio, Berio to Sing.
