= Cries of London =

Vocal composition by Luciano Berio

- by Luciano Berio
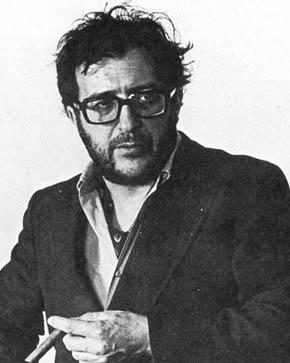
- Luciano Berio, at the time of the composition.
- Composed: 1973–4 (rev. 1976)
- Published: Universal Edition
- Duration: 15 minutes
- Movements: 7
- Scoring: Eight voices

Premiere
- Date: 1976
- Location: La Rochelle

Cries of London is a composition for eight voices by Italian composer Luciano Berio. Originally composed for six voices in 1974, it was expanded in 1976.

== Background ==
=== 1974 version ===
The preliminary version of Cries of London was composed between 1973 and 1974. It was composed for The King's Singers, an all-male British vocal ensemble whose programmes offered some elements from cabaret in them. The whole piece consisted of four movements scored for six voices (two countertenors, one tenor, two baritones, and one bass) and was premiered in Edinburgh in 1975.

=== 1976 version ===
One year later, Berio reworked and expanded the cycle to a total of seven movements and eight voices. Each of the movements in the final version of the piece were dedicated to different people. A preliminary version was premiered in La Rochelle in 1976; however, Swingle II officially premiered and recorded the piece in 1977. Both the early version and the revision were published by Universal Edition, in 1973 and 1976 respectively. The main melody used in the first and fifth movements of the cycle were also used with a different text in Coro, which was also written and premiered around 1974–76.

== Structure ==
This song cycle consists of seven movements of unequal length and is scored for eight voices: two sopranos, two altos, two tenors and two basses. Except for the last movement, none of the sections are entitled.

Structure of Cries of London
Song No.	Title	Incipit	Dedicatee	Tempo marking	Bars
I	—	"These are the cries of London town"	Gisela and Frans von Rossum	. = 64, simply, like a folk tune, with a touch of ecstasy	29
II	—	"Where are ye fair maids that have need of our trades"	Annie Neuburger	= 144	41
III	—	"Garlic, good garlic, the best of all the cries"	Andrew Rosner	= 84	44
IV	—	"These are the cries of London town"	Christine Beroff	= 100	33
V	—	"These are the cries of London town"	Carol Hall	. = 64	29
VI	—	"Money, money" / "Penny, penny"	Hélène Pousseur	= 66, deciso e vivace	47
VII	Cry of Cries	"Come money to me"	James Mallinson	= 72	57

The text used in the pieces was taken by Berio as he walked around different markets in London. While some songs from the cycle are expected to resemble folk tunes, they are entirely Berio's creation, and are not necessarily meant to imitate folk music, but they are rather echoes of vendors' voices as they rebounded from the walls of the houses from old London. Movements I and V are an exact repetition, while movement IV also uses exactly the same words.

Berio used some extended vocal techniques in this cycle, which include heavy breathing, humming and singing with the front teeth closed. According to Berio, Cries of London "can [...] be listened to as an exercise in musical characterization and dramatization". The singers are also expected to sing "instrumentally", without vibrato, although it calls for highly virtuosic abilities from the performers.

== Recordings ==
- The original vocal ensemble Swingle II, which included sopranos Catherine Bott and Olive Simpson, mezzo-sopranos Carol Hall and Linda Hirst, tenors John Potter and Ward Swingle, and basses David Beavan and John Lubbock, performed the world premiere recording of the piece in July 1976, at Decca Studio 3, in West Hampstead. The recording was released on vinyl in 1976 and CD in 1990.
- Sopranos Magnhild Korsvik and Ingeborg Dalheim, altos Mari Askvik and Astrid Sandvand Dahlen, tenors Øystein Stensheim and Håvard Gravdal, and basses Peder Arnt Kløvrud and Halvor Festervoll Melien, all of them members of the Norwegian Soloists' Choir, also recorded the piece at the Oslo Concert Hall in Oslo in September 2018. The recording was released by BIS Records in 2020.
