= Sequenza XI =

Composition for guitar by Luciano Berio

- by Luciano Berio
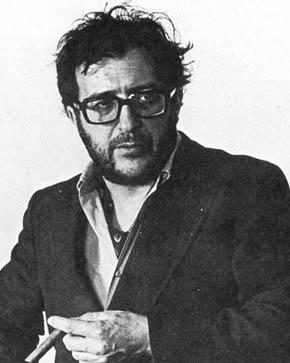
- Composed: 1987/1988
- Dedication: Eliot Fisk
- Scoring: guitar

Sequenza XI for solo guitar (1987–1988) is one of a series of Sequenzas by Luciano Berio. Written for the American guitarist Eliot Fisk.

== Form ==
The composition is in four large sections, and sets out from the six pitches of the open strings of the guitar. The composer asserted that two intervals are important elements in the work: the perfect fourth (which is the interval found between most neighbouring pairs of the guitar's strings) and the tritone, which leads to a different harmony of Berio's devising.

== Usage ==
Sequenza XI is a standard work for guitarists who have chosen avant-garde modern classical music as a part of their repertoire, e.g., Denis Sung-Hô (performed Sequenzas with members of the ensemble intercontemporain), Stefan Östersjö, Todd Seelye, Mats Scheidegger, Geoffrey Morris, Pablo Gómez, Pablo Márquez, Alan Thomas, Jürgen Ruck, Nico Couck, etc.: it has been recorded numerous times (see below).

Berio's Chemins V (1992) is a work for guitar and ensemble based on Sequenza XI.
