= Sequenza =

Set of musical compositions by Luciano Berio

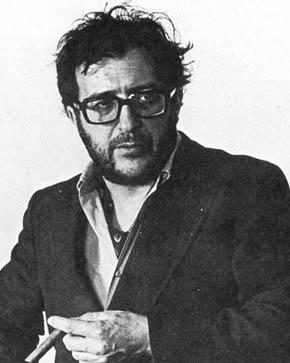
Luciano Berio in the 1970s

Sequenza (Italian for "sequence") is the name borne by fourteen compositions for solo instruments or voice by Luciano Berio. The pieces, some of which call for extended techniques, are:

- Sequenza I (1958; rev. 1992) for flute
- Sequenza II (1963) for harp
- Sequenza III (1965) for female voice
- Sequenza IV (1965) for piano
- Sequenza V (1966) for trombone
- Sequenza VI (1967) for viola
- Sequenza VII (1969/2000) for oboe (reworked as Sequenza VIIb for soprano saxophone in 2000)
- Sequenza VIII (1976) for violin
- Sequenza IX (1980) for clarinet (reworked 1981 as Sequenza IXb for alto saxophone, and 1980 as Sequenza IXc for bass clarinet)
- Sequenza X (1984) for trumpet and piano resonance
- Sequenza XI (1987) for guitar
- Sequenza XII (1995) for bassoon
- Sequenza XIII (1995) for accordion
- Sequenza XIV (2002) for cello (reworked in 2004 by Stefano Scodanibbio as Sequenza XIVb for double bass)

Several of these pieces became the basis of larger works:

- Sequenza II, with the addition of extra instrumental parts around the original solo, became Chemins I.
- Sequenza VI developed into Chemins II, Chemins IIb, Chemins IIc and Chemins III.
- Sequenza VII became Chemins IV.
- Sequenza XI became Chemins V.
- Sequenza X became Kol-Od, also known as Chemins VI.
- Sequenza IXb became Récit, also known as Chemins VII.
- Sequenza VIII became Corale.

Conversely, Sequenza IX grew out of a piece for clarinet and electronics (later withdrawn), originally known as Chemins V; NB it is not the same as the work with the same title which originates from Sequenza XI.
