= Circles (Berio) =

Composition by Luciano Berio

- by Luciano Berio
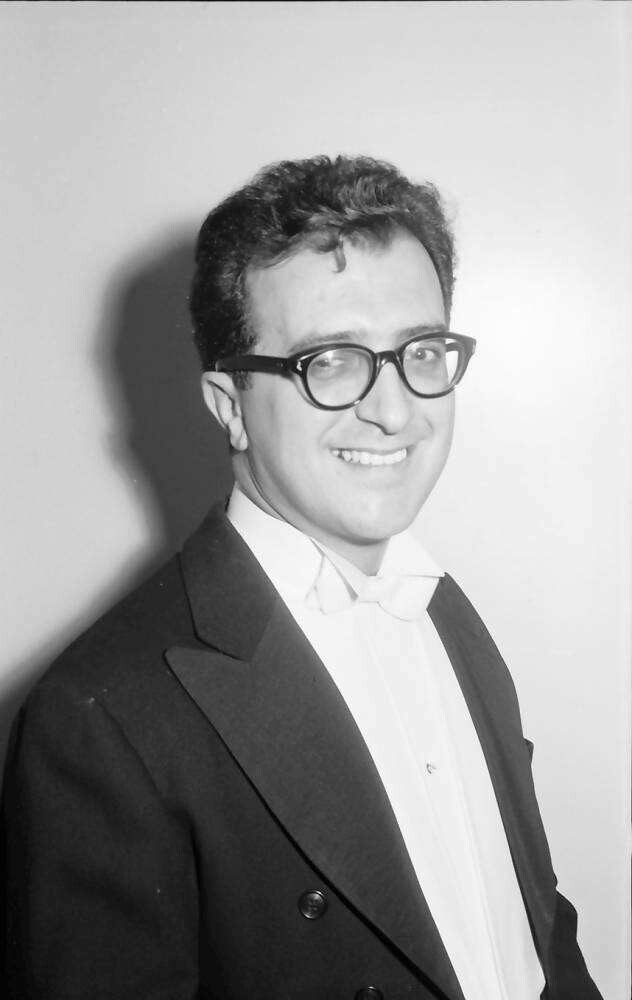
- Berio in Darmstadt, in 1959
- Text: poems by E. E. Cummings
- Composed: 1960
- Scoring: female voice; harp; percussion

Circles is a composition for female voice, harp and two percussionists by Luciano Berio. Written in 1960 Circles is a setting of three poems by E. E. Cummings, including the poems "Stinging", "Riverly Is a Flower", and "N(o)w".

== Context of the composition ==
Circles was written for Berio's wife, the American mezzo-soprano Cathy Berberian. The work followed by two years the landmark composition Thema (Omaggio a Joyce) in which Berio deconstructed Berberian's voice through the use of innovative electronic manipulation. Throughout Circles Berio explores similar sound textures while limiting himself exclusively to acoustic means. The work was commissioned by the Fromm Foundation, with a dedication in the score to Mrs Olga Koussevitsky.

== Musical style and form ==
Berio follows an ABCBA arch form in Circles (the text from the first two poems being repeated with a different setting). In this way to form of the composition itself expresses a circle. Berio gives precise instructions in the score for the location of the performers and percussion instruments on stage. Throughout the course of the work the singer moves backwards as if receding into the ensemble. She is also required to perform on specific percussion instruments such as finger cymbals, claves, and various kinds of chimes.
