= Sequenza V =

- by Luciano Berio
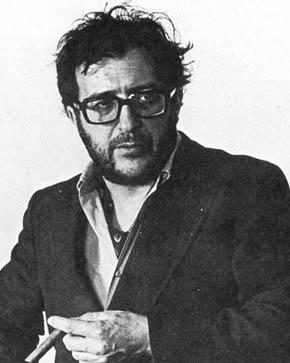
- Composed: 1966
- Dedication: Stuart Dempster
- Scoring: trombone

Sequenza V is a composition for solo trombone by Luciano Berio, part of his series of pieces with this title. Written in 1966 for Stuart Dempster, it has since been performed and recorded by Vinko Globokar, Benny Sluchin, Christian Lindberg, and others. The piece calls for many extended techniques including multiphonics (singing and playing at the same time), rattling a plunger mute against the bell of the instrument, glissandi, and producing sounds while inhaling. In addition, the trombonist mimes and must at one point turn to the audience and ask, "Why?"

Sequenza V was composed as a tribute to Grock, called "the last of the great clowns" by Berio (1998, 14). As a child of 11, the composer saw the clown perform and in the middle of his routine, Grock stopped, turned to the audience, and asked "warum?" ("why?"). This powerful performance had a lasting impact on Berio and he later said of it, "I didn't know whether to laugh or cry and I wanted to do both" (Berio 1998, 15).

In 1994, BIS Records released a laserdisc of Christian Lindberg performing Sequenza V in clown attire.
