= Thema (Omaggio a Joyce) =

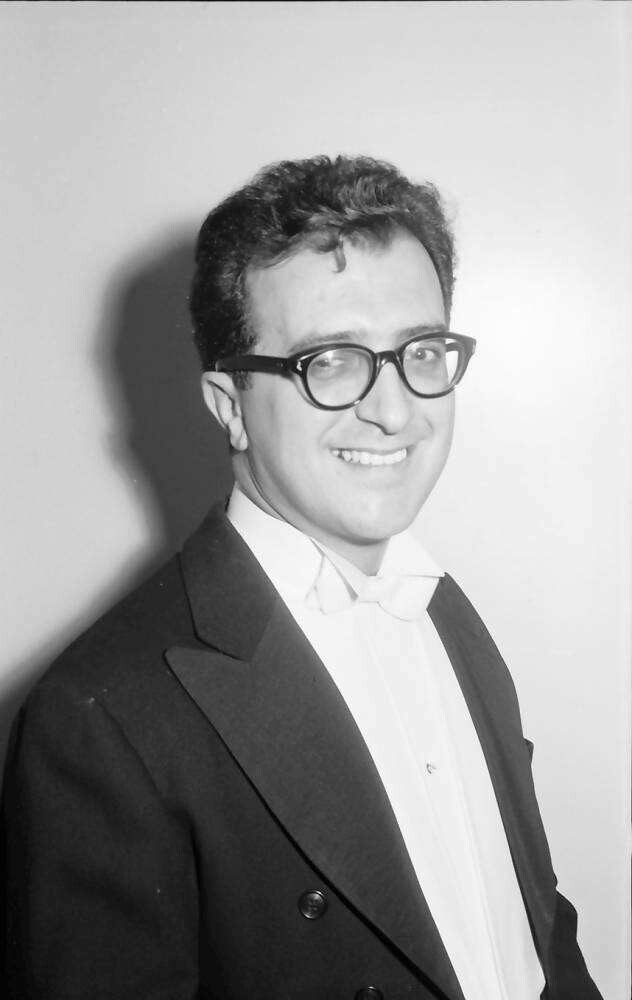
Luciano Berio in Darmstadt, in 1959

Thema (Omaggio a Joyce) is an electroacoustic composition by Luciano Berio, for voice and tape. Composed in 1958 and 1959, it is based on the interpretative reading of the poem "Sirens" from chapter 11 of the novel Ulysses by James Joyce by Cathy Berberian and on the elaboration of her recorded voice by technological means.

== History and context of the composition ==
According to the definitive piece published in 1995 (CD BMG 09026-68302-2), the text and the interpretation of it by Berberian can be heard in the first part (1 minute and 56 seconds), while the electroacoustic elaboration of it can be heard in the second part (6 minutes and 13 seconds); the complete length of the definitive composition is 8 minutes and 9 seconds.

The piece was originally composed to be part of a never broadcast radio program by Luciano Berio and Umberto Eco titled Omaggio a Joyce. Documenti sulla qualità onomatopeica del linguaggio poetico. Subsequently, the piece, conceived for four channels, was recorded in stereo in two versions, the first titled Thema (Omaggio a Joyce) (LP Turnabout TV 34177), 1958; the second titled Omaggio a Joyce (LP Limelight LS 86047), 1959. In 1995 it was digitally restored in stereo (CD BMG 09026-68302-2) and this is the version Berio declared as definitive (8 minutes and 9 seconds).

== Musical form ==
The work resumes the linguistic studies the composer had been carrying on for some years in collaboration with Eco during the first stages of the Studio di fonologia in Milan; these studies were focused, on the one hand, on the sonorous relationships between many different European languages; on the other hand, on pure vocalism from several points of view: linguistic, phonetic, anthropological, and musical. In particular, the construction of a new musical form based on the oscillation between music, literature and multimedia languages can be seen as the result of the interdisciplinary studies carried on at the Studio di Fonologia.

Luciano Berio aimed to the synthesis of different fields to break down the borders of the artistic and scientific specializations between music, poetry and technology. So first of all, the main feature of the composition is the oscillation between oblivion and construction which reminds directly to the poetic writing form. The work is based on the idea of the electroacoustic montage of sounds as well.

This is the first time in history of music a recorded intelligible text was literally "broke[n] into pieces". In particular, the composer had classified the recorded words included in "Sirens" according to their resonance colors, in relation to the resonance point of the vocal apparatus. The tonal colours were chosen in consideration of the phonetic sounds and their sonorous nature was then elaborated upon and mixed using the analogue technology of the Studio di Fonologia. This facility housed a number of oscillators. The long editing process was performed manually.

According to Daniele (2010), the compositional category of the contemporary musical art, using words and vocals as a primary source, playing with the tension between semantic and musical characteristics, through the technology, has been constituted from this moment on.

The intrinsic musicality of the language and the research of infinite possibilities of combining phonemes are very important in this work as well. The tension/relationship between construction of the words and a new elaboration of them and meaning of sounds, which is a peculiar element of the Joyce's writings, is transposed from the silent written form to a new musical, electroacoustic form. In this way, Berio fragments the Joyce's text read by Berberian to recompose it in a new technologically elaborated form. The electroacoustic elaborations and the montage are realized in the words and texts as on the sounds and noises produced by the voice. In particular, as Berio said, the sound object transformation must take into account the near-musical attributes that are contained in the sound object itself. To the degrees of the sound object transformation then corresponds a different degree of significance in relation to the original rough state of the object itself.

The composition features a very peculiar structure away from every known musical theory, to create a poetical-musical opera done not through themes but with the forms of language itself. In this oscillation and in the deconstruction of the meaning of the words, in the research of pure timbre and resonances, "the sound becomes meaning" and the voice becomes the symbol of the human body itself and its expressive sign, as the "symbol of language" or the principle of the "languages of things", according to the well-known theory of Walter Benjamin.

== See also ==
- List of compositions by Luciano Berio
