= Geta bera =

Sri Lankan traditional drum

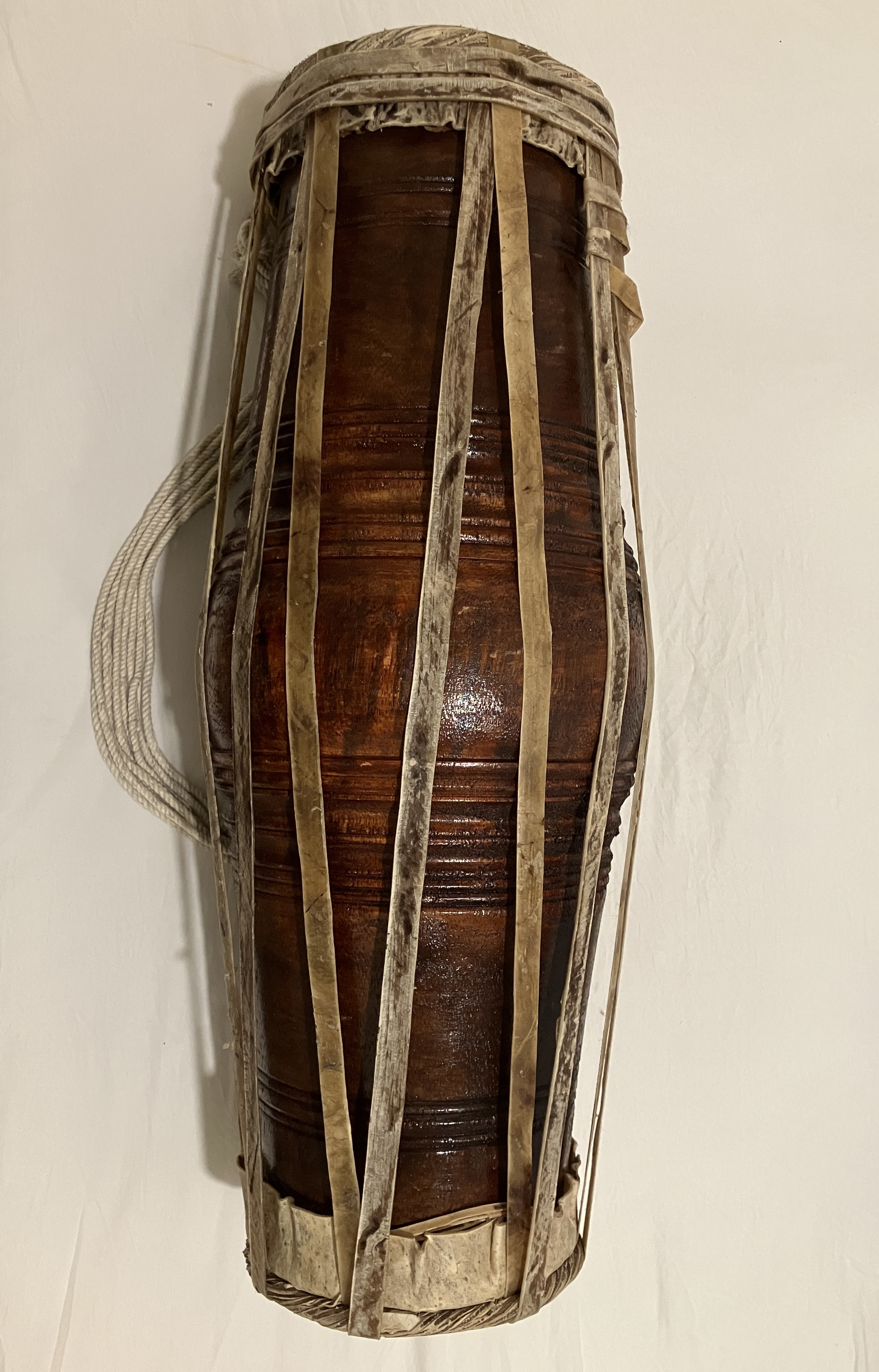
A wooden Geta Bera drum.

The geta bera, also known as the geta beraya, is a barrel drum from Sri Lanka. It is related to the mridangam, the pakhavaj, and the kendang. The geta bera is used primarily to accompany the traditional Kandyan dance, wedding processions and special events or occasions. The drum comes from upcountry, is double-headed and covered in skin. Both ends of the drum are played using the hands. It can also be called the Magul Beraya or the Udarata beraya.

== Appearance and Details ==
The drum is a double-headed membranophone with the two ends being narrower than the centre itself. The drum is made of wood. Usually from the Margosa tree, Ehela tree or the Jackfruit tree. The two ends are made from two different skins, one from a monkey and the other from an ox. It closely resembles an Indian mridangam drum. The skins are slightly larger than the circumference on the wooden end. The skins are held together by about 9 straps on seasoned cattle skin, in a zig-zag pattern. The drum is hollow, which makes it a resonance chamber. If the sound is too low, a wooden beater is used to hit the head of the drum repeatedly on the deer skin, to tune it. Ropes or a strap are tied onto the drummer's waist before playing.

== Sound and Playing style ==
The cattle end produces a low pitched sound, while the monkey skinned end produces a high-pitched sound. According to how the player hits the high-pitched end, the sound can vary a little.

The cattle end is often played with a flat hand, while the monkey end can be played differently, according to the Bera pada ( Sinhala for drum beat).

== Sources ==
- Jähnichen, G. (2023). Refining versus Simplification in Transmission and Performance / Humans and their Musical Instruments as Part of Nature. STUDIA INSTRUMENTORUM MUSICAE POPULARIS. Logos Berlin. ISBN 978-3-8325-5685-3.
- Bulathsinghala, L.D. (2024). The Legacy of Stylistic Theatre in the Creation of a Modern Sinhala Drama in Sri Lanka. ISSN. Taylor & Francis. ISBN 978-1-04-002172-9.
