= Différences (Berio) =

Musical work by Luciano Berio (1958)

- by Luciano Berio
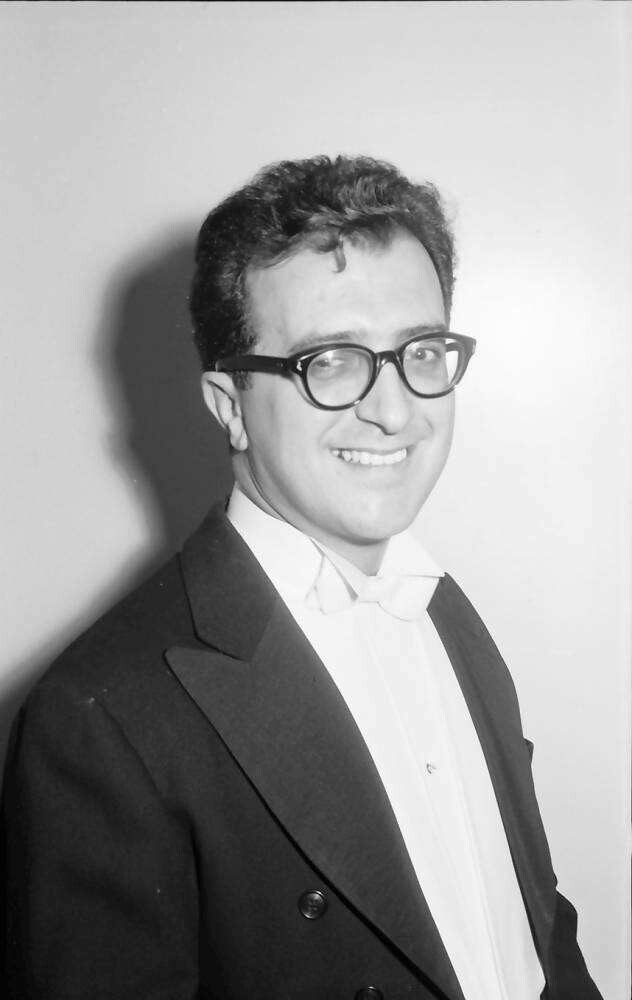
- Berio in Darmstadt, in 1959
- Composed: 1958/59
- Performed: March 1959
- Scoring: flute; clarinet; viola; cello; harp; tape

Différences is a composition by Luciano Berio for flute, clarinet, viola, cello, harp and magnetic tape, dating 1958–59. It was written for the Domaine musical concerts in Paris and first performed in March 1959, conducted by Pierre Boulez.

Différences is one of the first attempts to combine live instruments with electronic music. At the centre of the work, the tape sound takes the place of the performers. They return with various pizzicato entries, creating a homogeneous texture which seeks only an alteration in the expression rather than a disruption in the character of the music.

Berio began the composition for Différences a year before the premiere by recording in Paris the same musicians who were to give the first performance. In the Studio di fonologia musicale in Milan he then transformed these recordings to produce the tape with which the musicians interact during the performance. Berio remarked that "[i]n Différences the original model of the five instruments coexists alongside an image of itself that is continually modified, until the different phases of transformation deliver up a completely altered image that no longer has anything to do with the original" (Berio, Dalmonte & Varga 1985, p. 126).
