= Sequenza XII =

- by Luciano Berio
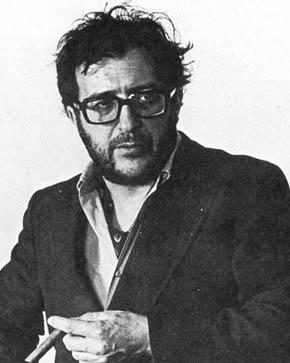
- Composed: 1995
- Dedication: Pascal Gallois
- Performed: 15 June 1995
- Scoring: bassoon

Sequenza XII is a composition for solo bassoon, written by Luciano Berio in 1995 (Osmond-Smith 2001), and part of a series of fourteen Sequenze composed between 1958 and 2002. The work was written for, and dedicated to, the French bassoonist Pascal Gallois, who gave the world première on 15 June 1995.

Sequenza XII is the longest of all the Sequenze, at 19 minutes. As with the other works in the series, it reflects Berio's fascination with virtuosity, "understood not merely as technical dexterity, but as a manifestation of an agile musical intelligence that relishes the challenge of complexity" (Osmond-Smith 2001). In Sequenza XII, Berio makes deliberate use of the different registers and explores the physical limits of performance through extended techniques, for example, through different uses of the tongue to modify airflow, by writing notes and phrases that are so long they require the performer to use circular breathing, the use of glissando, and multiple sounds producing by singing through the instrument while playing (Osmond-Smith 2001; Pedone 1997).

== Discography ==
- Luciano Berio. Sequenzas [I–XIII]. Ensemble InterContemporain members (Pascal Gallois, bassoon). Deutsche Grammophon 457 038 (3CDs), 1998.
- Luciano Berio. Sequenzas I–XIV. Various performers (Kenneth Munday, bassoon). Naxos 8557661 (3CDs), 2006.
- Luciano Berio. The Complete Sequenzas. Various performers (Noriko Shimada, bassoon). Mode 161/3 (4CDs), 2006.
- Pascal Gallois (bassoon). Voyages: music by Berio, Hosokawa, Schoeller. Stradivarius 33736 (1CD), 2006.
- Duo Palmós. (Stefanie Liedtke, bassoon and Lorenda Ramou, piano) "Breathless": music by Skalkottas, Berio, Yun and Kyriakides. Spektral SRL4-08035 (1CD), 2008.
