= A-Ronne (Berio) =

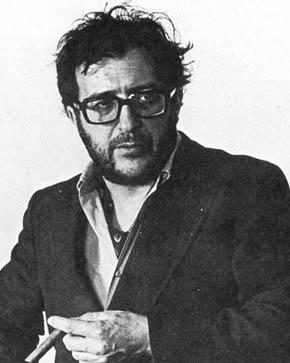
Luciano Berio in the 1970s

A–Ronne is a composition by the Italian composer Luciano Berio, composed in June 1974 as a tape composition for 5 actors and arranged in 1975 for unaccompanied vocal ensemble (8 singers).

A-Ronne is a setting of a poem by the Italian avant-garde poet Edoardo Sanguineti. Sanguineti's poem is almost entirely built from extracts from and allusions to a wide range of texts, including various translations of The Bible (St. John's Gospel), works by Dante (The Divine Comedy), Goethe (Faust), Karl Marx and Friedrich Engels (The Communist Manifesto), T.S. Eliot ("East Coker" from Four Quartets), James Joyce (Finnegans Wake), Samuel Beckett (Endgame), Roland Barthes (an essay on Georges Bataille) and also correspondence between Sanguineti and the composer. The title of the piece is an extension of the term "from A to Z": in the old Italian alphabet the three signs ette, conne, ronne came after z.

Berio employs a wide range of vocalisations, from sung phrases borrowed from Dutch folksongs to direct speech at various pitches and wordless intonations and inflexions. Although Sanguineti's poem is repeated several times throughout, it is usually indiscernible amongst the variety of textures. As such, Berio described the work as a "documentary on a poem by Edoardo Sanguineti, as one would say a documentary on a painting or an exotic country". He also described it as a "theatre of the ear" in the style of late sixteenth-century Italian madrigal singing (madrigale rappresentativo). Also available on BMG (RCA Victrola CD 09026-68302-2).

The work is divided into six untitled sections. It was commissioned by Dutch Radio KRO as a tape composition for five voice actors, three male and two female. It lasts 31:20. The 1975 arrangement was premiered by Swingle II who recorded it for Decca Records in London in 1975.
