= Francis Pierre =

French harpist

Francis Pierre (1931-2013) was a French harpist. He played for the Orchestre de Paris and taught at the Conservatoire de Paris.
