= Sequenza IV =

Composition for piano by Luciano Berio

- by Luciano Berio
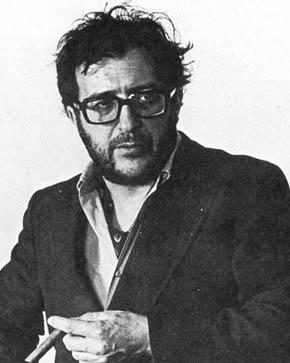
- Composed: 1965/66, rev. 1993
- Dedication: Jocy de Oliveira
- Scoring: piano

Sequenza IV for solo piano (composed in 1965–66, revised in 1993 – written for Jocy de Oliveira, then de Carvalho) is the fourth in a series of solo Sequenze by Luciano Berio that started with the publication of Sequenza I for solo flute (1958; rev. 1992).

== Analysis ==
The opening chords present all the pitch materials of the piece. They are of two kinds: (1) "resonant" chords made by superposing two major, minor, augmented, diminished triads (sometimes with an added seventh or ninth), to form basically "harmonic" structures, and (2) "anti-resonant" or "noisy" chords based on chromatic relationships and containing a large number of seconds and fourths, giving them a more "inharmonic" character. These chords are progressively horizontalised, creating "a syntactic flux between structurally opposite and intermediate constituents". The resulting opposition between chords and fast, single-voice chromatic figures resembles the compositional alternation of clusters and melodic gestures in Karlheinz Stockhausen's Klavierstück X.

The treatment of tempos also serves to govern the overall form. There are three types of tempo usage:

1. a single tempo is used for a long span of music, providing a sense of stability, stasis, or even tension
2. different independent tempos governing short gestures are juxtaposed within a single section
3. the tempo is made to accelerate or decelerate to underline the particular gestures

The chordal opening soon dissolves into the turbulent "centre" of the piece, featuring tremolos and bursts of notes within a narrow registral span. There are also single notes and small clusters covering the piano's entire range. Concealed beneath this active surface of this section are repetitions and extensions of the chords from the beginning of the piece constituting a long repeated pitch sequence (containing internal recurring sequences). These relationships become more evident as the turbulence subsides toward the end of the section, finally coalescing into a conclusion of staccato chords similar to those at the outset of the Sequenza.
