= Pablo Gómez (guitarist) =

Mexican guitarist

Pablo Gómez is a classical guitarist from Mexico, specializing in contemporary music. He studied with Magnus Andersson in Stockholm, Sweden. He teaches at the Instituto Nacional de Bellas Artes y Literatura. He has given the premieres of various contemporary works.

Gómez currently is the coordinator of chamber music at the Festival Internacional Cervantino.

== Recordings ==
Tañendo Recio (Quindecim recordings, listed under catálogo: "De Vanguardia")
