= Sequenza VI =

Composition for viola by Luciano Berio

- by Luciano Berio
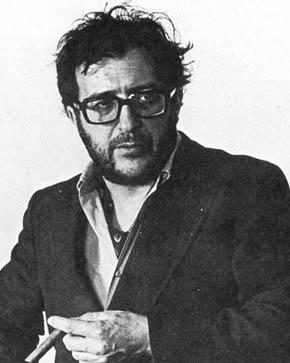
- Related: Chemins II, Chemin III
- Composed: 1967
- Dedication: Serge Collot
- Scoring: viola

Sequenza VI is a composition for solo viola by Luciano Berio, part of his series of fourteen Sequenze.

== History ==
Sequenza VI was written in 1967 for Serge Collot, to whom the score is dedicated. It also forms the core of two other Berio compositions, Chemins II for viola and nine instruments (1968), and Chemins III (1969), which adds an orchestra to the forces of Chemins II. Walter Trampler, for whom Chemins III was written, believed it had in fact been composed first and the Sequenza then extracted from it. The relationship of the three works is described by Berio as being "something like the layers of an onion: distinct, separate, yet intimately contoured on each other; each new layer creates a new, though related surface, and each older layer assumes a new function as soon as it is covered". Two further works were evolved from Chemins II: Chemins IIb for orchestra (1969) and Chemins IIc for bass clarinet and orchestra (1972).

== Analysis ==
Sequenza VI exploits the harmonic possibilities of a fundamentally melodic instrument. It does this in two ways: first, by implying harmonies with melodic lines circling continuously through a small number of fixed pitches and, second, by presenting long series of three- and four-part chords in which the pitches are kept sounding by means of across-the-strings tremolo.

The work alternates these two gestural ideas (melodic and chordal), producing a sectional form based on changes in texture, gestural predominance, and shaping processes. The sections may be summarized as a pattern of AA'BA''B', with the A' and A'' sections each divided into two subsections. The opening A section is an exposition dominated at first by the tremolando chords, but also using short melodic segments to articulate phrases and create internal fluctuations. These melodic figures gradually increase in prominence over the course of this section. The A' section develops the chordal gestures, while the B section focuses instead on the melodic ideas, using the tremolando gesture as an articulative device at first. In a reversal of the process found in the exposition, the tremolando chords gradually increase in frequency over the B section. A'' restates the chordal material and, in its second subsection, introduces a heightened level of activity. The concluding B' section then serves as a coda.
