= Sinfonia (Berio) =

Musical work; symphony in five movements composed by Luciano Berio

- by Luciano Berio
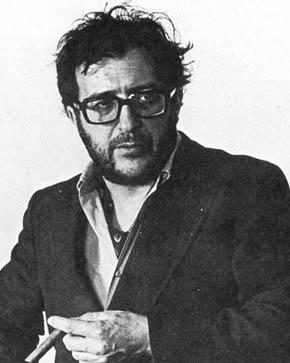
- Composed: 1968–69
- Dedication: Leonard Bernstein
- Movements: Five
- Scoring: Orchestra and eight amplified voices

Premiere
- Date: October 10, 1968
- Location: New York City
- Conductor: Luciano Berio
- Performers: New York Philharmonic with The Swingle Singers

Sinfonia (for 8 voices and orchestra) is a 1968 work by the Italian composer Luciano Berio commissioned by the New York Philharmonic (for its 125th anniversary) and dedicated to Leonard Bernstein. The "singing voices" are not incorporated classically but rather speak, whisper and shout excerpts from texts in order to paint in sound an abstract and distorted history of culture. They are usually amplified. The source texts include Claude Lévi-Strauss's The Raw and the Cooked, Samuel Beckett's novel The Unnamable and instructions from musical scores by Gustav Mahler. The dedicatee writes in the text version of his Charles Eliot Norton Lectures from 1973 that Sinfonia was representative of the new direction classical music was taking after the pessimistic decade of the sixties.

== Premieres ==
Originally commissioned by the New York Philharmonic for its 125th anniversary, Sinfonia was premiered on October 10, 1968, by the orchestra and The Swingle Singers, with Berio conducting. At the time, the work was still in four movements. In the months after the premiere Berio added a fifth movement, which was first played when Sinfonia was performed during the 1969 Donaueschingen Festival by the Southwest German Radio Symphony Orchestra conducted by Ernest Bour, and subsequently in London at the July 22 Promenade concert, with the BBC Symphony Orchestra and The Swingle Singers conducted by the composer. The New York Philharmonic first played the five movement version of Sinfonia on October 8, 1970, conducted by Leonard Bernstein, to whom the work is dedicated.

== Instrumentation ==
The Sinfonia is scored for a large orchestra:

Soloists
8 voices

Woodwinds
1 piccolo
3 flutes
2 oboes
1 cor anglais
1 clarinet in E♭
3 soprano clarinets in B♭
1 alto saxophone
1 tenor saxophone
2 bassoons
1 contrabassoon

Brass
4 horns
4 trumpets in C
3 trombones
1 bass tuba

Percussion
3 players:

1. timpani, glockenspiel, tam-tam (large), snare drum, bongos
2. marimba, tam-tam (medium), sizzle cymbal, bass drum, snare drum, tambourine, 3 wood blocks, whip, güiro, sleigh bell, triangle
3. vibraphone, tam-tam (small), cymbal, bass drum, snare drum, bongos, tambourine, castanets, güiro, sleigh bells, 2 triangles

Keyboard
1 electric harpsichord
1 piano
1 electric organ

Strings
1 harp

24 violins in three groups
8 violas
8 cellos
8 double basses

== Movements ==
The work is in five movements:

1. [untitled]
2. O King
3. In ruhig fliessender Bewegung
4. [untitled]
5. [untitled]

The first movement primarily uses a French text source and the third movement primarily uses English text sources. The text for the second movement is limited to the phonemes of the title, "O Martin Luther King". The remaining movements are primarily instrumental with occasional vocal elements. The overall form of the piece is an arch form with elements of the first movement reflected in the fifth and connections between the second and fourth. The third movement, a study of inter-relations, stands on its own.

=== First movement ===
In the first movement of Sinfonia, Berio uses texts from Le cru et le cuit (The Raw and the Cooked) by the French anthropologist Claude Lévi-Strauss. The form of the piece is also inspired by Lévi-Strauss, who in his work on mythology had found that many myths were structured like musical compositions, with some myths having a "fugal" form and others resembling a sonata. One mythical transformation however, had a structure for which he was not able to find a musical equivalent, and Berio himself said that he used this form in his Sinfonia—though Lévi-Strauss did not initially notice this. Interviewed by Didier Eribon, Lévi-Strauss said:

[Y]ou know that Berio used The Raw and the Cooked in his Sinfonia. A part of the text is recited, accompanied by the music. I admit that I did not grasp the reason for this choice. During an interview a musicologist asked me about it, and I answered that the book had just come out and the composer had probably used it because it was at hand. Now, a few months ago Berio, whom I don't know, sent me a very disgruntled letter. He had read the interview, several years after the fact, and assured me that the movement of this symphony offered the musical counterpart of the mythical transformation I was revealing. He included a book by a musicologist [Osmond-Smith 1985] who had demonstrated the fact. I apologized for the misunderstanding, which was, I said, the result of my lack of musical training, but I'm still baffled.

=== Second movement: O King ===
In 1968, Berio completed O King, a work dedicated to the memory of Martin Luther King Jr. This movement exists in two versions: one for voice, flute, clarinet, violin, cello and piano, the other for eight voices and orchestra. The orchestral version of O King was shortly after its completion integrated into Sinfonia. It uses a fair amount of whole-tone scale motives (which also appears in the quote from The Rite of Spring in the third movement).

=== Third movement ===
In the third movement of Sinfonia, Berio lays the groundwork by quoting multiple excerpts from the third-movement scherzo from Mahler's Symphony No. 2 and has the orchestra play a slightly cut-up, re-shuffled and occasionally re-orchestrated version of it. Berio himself stated, "If I were asked to explain the presence of Mahler's Scherzo in Sinfonia, the image that would naturally spring to mind would be that of a river running through a constantly-changing landscape, disappearing from time to time underground, only to emerge later totally transformed." Many have described Berio's third movement as a "musical collage", in essence using an "Ivesian" approach to the entire movement (American composer Charles Ives in his Symphony No. 2 first used musical quotation techniques on a grand scale at the turn of the 20th century about 65 years earlier).

The orchestra plays snatches of Claude Debussy's La mer, Maurice Ravel's La valse, Igor Stravinsky's The Rite of Spring, as well as quotations from Arnold Schoenberg, Anton Webern, Johannes Brahms, Henri Pousseur, Paul Hindemith, and many others (including Berio himself) creating a dense collage, occasionally to humorous effect. When one of the reciters says "I have a present for you", the orchestra follows immediately with the introductory chord from Don, the first movement from Pli selon pli by Pierre Boulez.

The quoted fragments are often chosen because they bear a rhythmic or melodic likeness to Mahler's scherzo. For example, Berio uses a violin line from the second movement of Alban Berg's violin concerto with chromatically descending sixteenth notes two measures before a similarly descending line appears in Mahler's scherzo. This is then accompanied by another violin descent, taken from Johannes Brahms' violin concerto. The text from Beckett at this point begins, "So after a period of immaculate silence there seemed", but, instead of continuing the quotation ("a feeble cry was heard by me"), Berio substitutes the words "to be a violin concerto being played in the other room in three quarters" and then, after the Berg quotation, alto 2 insists on "two violin concertos", at the point where Berg is interrupted by Brahms.

The eight individual voices simultaneously recite texts from various sources, most notably the first page of Samuel Beckett's The Unnamable. Other text fragments include allusions to James Joyce, graffiti Berio noticed during the May 1968 protests in Paris, and notes from Berio's diary.

Berio himself describes the movement as a "Voyage to Cythera" in which a ship filled with gifts is headed towards the island dedicated to the goddess of love.

==== Musical quotations ====
A partial list of musical quotations used in the third movement of Sinfonia in order of their appearance:

- Schoenberg's Five Pieces for Orchestra, fourth movement, "Peripetie" (violent scale from bars 2–3 played by the brass), in bars 1–6
- A brief quotation from the beginning of Mahler's Symphony No. 4 in bars 2–10
- Claude Debussy's La mer, second movement, "Jeux de vagues" (opening measures), in bars 4–5
- Mahler's Symphony No. 2 (Resurrection), third movement (the only quotation that is ongoing) entering in bar 7, from where it continues to the end of the movement, though not always audibly. Also it is worth noting that in the original movement from the 2nd symphony, it already includes quotes from Bruckner's Symphony No. 4, Beethoven's Op. 96 Violin Sonata and a song from Schumann's Dichterliebe.
- Paul Hindemith's Kammermusik No. 4
- Ravel's Daphnis et Chloé, flute solo from the Pantomime
- Arnold Schoenberg's "Farben" from Five Pieces for Orchestra
- Debussy's "Dialogue du vent et de la mer" from La mer
- Debussy's "Jeux de vagues" returns
- Berlioz's idée fixe from the Symphonie fantastique (played by the flutes and oboes), in bar 106
- Ravel's La valse (orchestra plays octave motif with piccolo playing a chromatic scale)
- the Scherzo from Beethoven's 9th Symphony
- Stravinsky's The Rite of Spring (the "Dance of the Earth" sequence at the end of the first tableau), bars 170–85
- Stravinsky's Agon (upper oboe part from the "Double pas de quatre" as well the castanet part from the "Bransle Gai")
- the solo violin part from measures 170-176 from the 1st movement of Berg's Violin Concerto in measures 61-66
- another solo violin excerpt from bars 48 and 49 from the 2nd movement of Brahms' Violin Concerto in measures 68 and 69
- Richard Strauss's Der Rosenkavalier (one of the waltzes composed for the opera)
- another extract from Ravel's La valse
- a chorale by Johann Sebastian Bach
- a self-quotation from Berio's very own Epifanie after bars 200
- the 4th movement from Brahms' 4th symphony
- Couleurs Croisees by Henri Pousseur
- the end of the second movement of Bach's Brandenburg Concerto No. 1
- Alban Berg's Wozzeck (the drowning scene late in the third act)
- Beethoven's Pastoral Symphony, second movement (melody stated with the clarinets)
- Resumption of Hindemith's Kammermusik No. 4 in the solo violin, starting in bar 429
- Another quotation from Beethoven's Pastoral Symphony, ending in bar 448
- Brief recapitulation of the opening of the movement: Schoenberg's "Peripetie", Debussy's La Mer (this time from the third movement "Dialogue du vent et de la mer"), starting at bar 488
- Boulez's Pli selon pli, very first chord of the entire piece from the first movement ("Don")
- Anton Webern's Cantata No. 2, Op. 31, fifth movement (opening), in bars 547–54
- Karlheinz Stockhausen's Gruppen for three orchestras (during the introductions of the vocalists near the end, bars 555–560)

=== Fourth movement ===
The brief fourth movement is a return to the tonality of the second, relatively serene after the frenetic third movement. It begins again with a Mahler quotation—the chorus taken from the end of the "Resurrection" symphony. The voices make use of various vocal effects, including whispers, syllabic fragments, and distortions of previous textual material.

=== Fifth movement ===
This movement was added by Berio a year later, intended to balance the first four. The movement revisits the text from the previous sections, organizing the material in a more orderly fashion to create what Berio calls "narrative substance".

It opens with a quotation from Lévi-Strauss that is at the same time a veiled reference to Mahler's second symphony: the fifth movement of Sinfonia opens with the words "rose de sang" (French for "rose of blood"), and the fourth movement of Mahler's symphony begins with the words "O Röschen rot!" (German for "O rosebud red!").

== Discography ==
=== Four-movement version ===
- Sinfonia (1968): New York Philharmonic and The Swingle Singers, conducted by Berio, Columbia Masterworks, 1969.

=== Five-movement version ===
- Orchestre Philharmonique, Sinfonia Singers, dir. Ward Swingle, cond. Berio, Adès, Semaines musicales internationales de Paris, 1973 (live)
- Southwest German Radio Symphony Orchestra and The Swingle Singers, conducted by Ernest Bour. LP recording, two 12-inch discs. SWF 21/22. [Baden-Baden]: Südwestfunk, 1975.
- Orchestre National de France and The [New] Swingle Singers, conducted by Pierre Boulez, Erato, recorded 1984.
- Royal Concertgebouw Orchestra and Electric Phoenix, conducted by Riccardo Chailly. Decca, 1990.
- Orchestre de Paris and Electric Phoenix, conducted by Semyon Bychkov. Philips Classics Records, 1996.
- Gothenburg Symphony Orchestra and London Voices, conducted by Péter Eötvös. Deutsche Grammophon, 2012.
- Finnish Radio Symphony Orchestra conducted by Hannu Lintu. Ondine, 2014.
- BBC Symphony Orchestra and Synergy Vocals, conducted by Josep Pons. Harmonia Mundi, 2016.
- Seattle Symphony and Roomful of Teeth, conducted by Ludovic Morlot. CD recording, Seattle Symphony Media SSM1018, 2018.
