= Sequenza I =

Composition for flute by Luciano Berio

- by Luciano Berio
- Composed: 1958
- Dedication: Severino Gazzelloni
- Performed: 1958
- Published: 1992
- Scoring: flute

Sequenza I is a composition written in 1958 by Luciano Berio for the flutist Severino Gazzelloni. It was first published by Suvini-Zerboni, but the notation was revised much later and this version published by Universal Edition in 1992. It is the first in a series of fourteen Sequenze, each for a different solo instrument (or voice), the last composed in 2002.
