= Luciano Berio =

Italian composer (1925–2003)

Luciano Berio OMRI
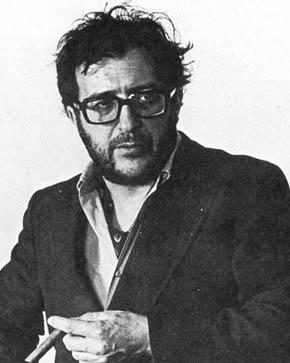
- Berio in the 1970s
- Born: 24 October 1925; Oneglia, Italy
- Died: 27 May 2003 (aged 77); Rome, Italy
- Works: List of compositions

Luciano Berio (24 October 1925 – 27 May 2003) was an Italian composer noted for his experimental work (in particular Sequenza, his series of solo pieces using extended techniques, and his 1968 orchestral composition Sinfonia) and for his pioneering work in electronic music. His early work was influenced by Igor Stravinsky and experiments with serial and electronic techniques, while his later works explore indeterminacy and the use of spoken texts as the basic material for composition.

== Life and career ==
Berio was born in Oneglia (now part of Imperia), on the Ligurian coast of Italy on 24 October 1925. He was taught piano by his father and grandfather, who were both organists. During World War II he was conscripted into the army, but on his first day, he injured his hand while learning how a gun worked and spent three months in a military hospital.

After the war, unable to continue studying the piano because of his injured hand, he instead focused on composition. He studied at the Milan Conservatory, counterpoint with Giulio Cesare Paribeni and from 1948 composition with Giorgio Federico Ghedini. He was exposed to the music of Bartók, Hindemith, Stravinsky and the Second Viennese School. In 1947, he had the first public performance of one of his works, a suite for piano. Berio made a living at this time by conducting at small opera houses and accompanying singing classes, and it was in doing this that he met the American mezzo-soprano Cathy Berberian who studied for a scholarship; they married in 1950, shortly after graduating; they divorced in 1964. Berio wrote a number of pieces that exploited her distinctive voice.

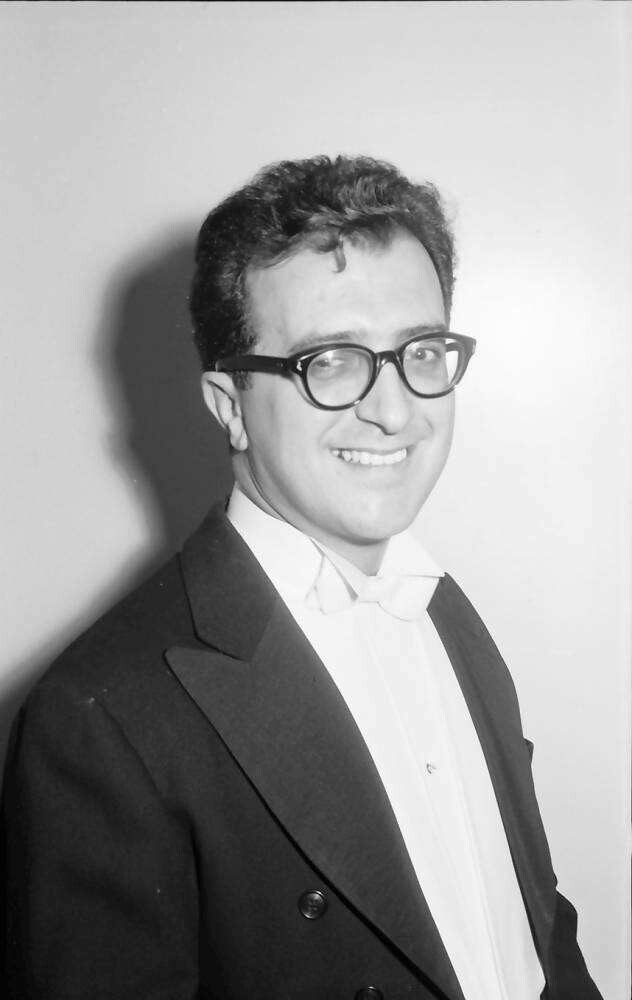
Berio in Darmstadt, in 1959

In 1952, Berio went to the United States to study with Luigi Dallapiccola at Tanglewood, from whom he gained an interest in serialism. From 1954 he attended the Internationale Ferienkurse für Neue Musik at Darmstadt, where he met Pierre Boulez, Karlheinz Stockhausen, György Ligeti and Mauricio Kagel. He became interested in electronic music. He worked for the broadcaster RAI in Milan from 1953 to 1960, where he co-founded, with Bruno Maderna, the Studio di fonologia musicale in 1955, which became one of the most important studios for electronic music in Europe. He invited a number of significant composers to work there, among them Henri Pousseur and John Cage. He produced an electronic music periodical, Incontri Musicali, from 1956 to 1960 which was connected to a concert series of the same name.

In 1960 Berio returned to Tanglewood, this time as Composer in Residence, and in 1962, on an invitation from Darius Milhaud, took a teaching post at Mills College in Oakland, California. From 1960 to 1962, Berio also taught at the Dartington International Summer School. He became a resident of the United States in 1963. In 1965, he began to teach at the Juilliard School, and there he founded the Juilliard Ensemble, a group dedicated to performances of contemporary music. In 1966, he married the noted philosopher of science Susan Oyama. They divorced in 1972. His students included Louis Andriessen, Noah Creshevsky, Steven Gellman, Dina Koston, Steve Reich, Luca Francesconi, Giulio Castagnoli, Flavio Emilio Scogna, William Schimmel and Phil Lesh of the Grateful Dead.

All this time, Berio had been steadily composing and building a reputation, winning the Prix Italia in 1966 for Laborintus II, a work for voices, instruments and tape with text by Edoardo Sanguineti that was commissioned by the French Television to celebrate the 700th anniversary of Dante Alighieri's birth. His reputation was strengthened when his Sinfonia was premiered in 1968. In 1972, Berio returned to Italy. From 1974 to 1980, he was the director of the electro-acoustic division of IRCAM in Paris. He married the musicologist Talia Pecker in 1977.

In 1987, he opened Tempo Reale, a centre for musical research and production based in Florence. In 1988, he was made an Honorary Member of the Royal Academy of Music, London. The following year, he received the Ernst von Siemens Music Prize. He was elected a Foreign Honorary Member of the American Academy of Arts and Sciences in 1994. The same year, he became Distinguished Composer in Residence at Harvard University, remaining there until 2000. In 1993–94, he gave the Charles Eliot Norton lectures at Harvard, later published as Remembering the Future. In 2000, he became Presidente and Sovrintendente at the Accademia Nazionale di Santa Cecilia in Rome. Berio was active as a conductor and continued to compose to the end of his life.

=== Personal life ===
Berio and Cathy Berberian had a daughter, he and Susan Oyama had a son and a daughter, and he and Talia Pecker had two sons.

Berio was an atheist. He was noted for his sense of humour. He gave a two-hour seminar at a summer school in the United States analyzing Beethoven's 7th Symphony, demonstrating that it was a work of radical genius. The next day he gave another two-hour seminar, with a completely straight face, showing why it was hopelessly flawed and a creative dead-end.

Berio died in a hospital in Rome on 27 May 2003, at the age of 77.

=== Influences ===
Ian Leslie writes in his biography of John Lennon and Paul McCartney that McCartney attended a 1966 concert of Berio's Laborintus 2 in Belgravia and spoke to Berio after the concert. The tape collage used by Berio in Laborintus 2 became an inspiration for the subsequent use of sound collage by The Beatles in their LP Sgt. Pepper's Lonely Hearts Club Band and after.

== Work ==
Berio's electronic work dates for the most part from his time at Milan's Studio di Fonologia. One of the most influential works he produced there was Thema (Omaggio a Joyce) (1958), based on Cathy Berberian reading from James Joyce's Ulysses, which can be considered as the first electroacoustic composition in the history of western music made with voice and elaboration of it by technological means. A later work, Visage (1961) sees Berio creating a wordless emotional language by cutting up and rearranging a recording of Cathy Berberian's voice; therefore the composition is based on the symbolic and representative charge of gestures and voice inflections, "from inarticulate sounds to syllables, from laughter to tears and singing, from aphasia to inflection patterns from specific languages: English and Italian, Hebrew and the Neapolitan dialect".

In 1968, Berio completed O King a work which exists in two versions: one for voice, flute, clarinet, violin, cello and piano, the other for eight voices and orchestra. The piece is in memory of Martin Luther King Jr., who had been assassinated shortly before its composition. In it, the voice(s) intones first the vowels, and then the consonants which make up his name, only stringing them together to give his name in full in the final bars.

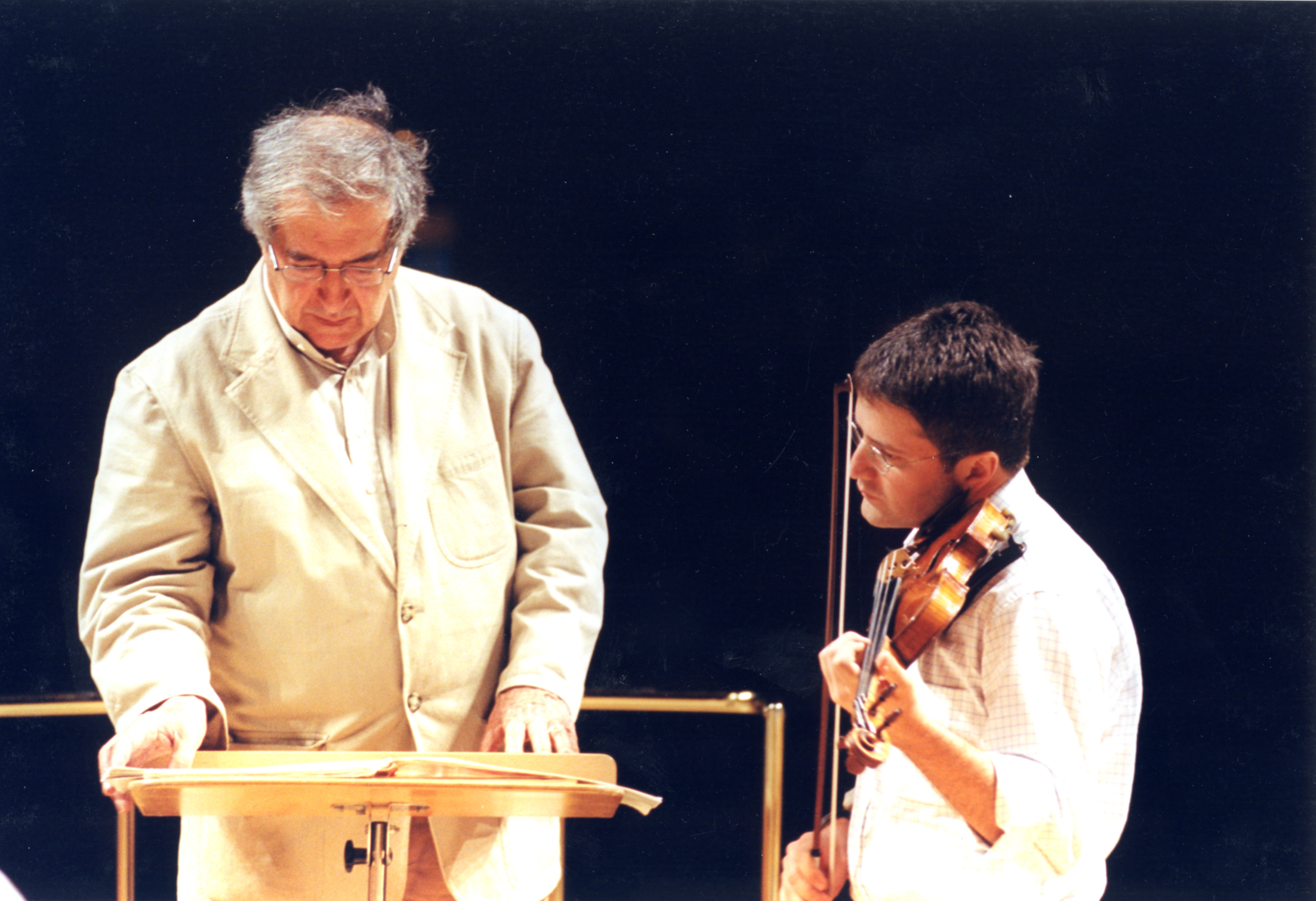
Berio with violinist Francesco D'Orazio

The orchestral version of O King was, shortly after its completion, integrated into what is perhaps Berio's most famous work, Sinfonia (1967–69), for orchestra and eight amplified voices. The voices are not used in a traditional classical way; they frequently do not sing at all, but speak, whisper and shout. The third movement is a collage of literary and musical quotations. A-Ronne (1974) is similarly collaged, but with the focus more squarely on the voice. It was originally written as a radio program for five actors, and reworked in 1975 for eight vocalists and an optional keyboard part. The work is one of a number of collaborations with the poet Edoardo Sanguineti, who for this piece provided a text full of quotations from sources including the Bible, T. S. Eliot and Karl Marx.

Another example of the influence of Sanguineti is the large work Coro (premiered 1977), scored for orchestra, solo voices, and a large choir, whose members are paired with instruments of the orchestra. The work extends over roughly an hour, and explores a number of themes within a framework of folk music from a variety of regions: Chile, North America, Africa. Recurrent themes are the expression of love and passion; the pain of being parted from loved ones; the death of a wife or husband. A line repeated often is "come and see the blood on the streets", a reference to a poem by Pablo Neruda, written in the context of the outbreak of the civil war in Spain.

In the last period of his production Berio was also interested in the use of live electronics, applied in some compositions as Ofanìm (1988–1997) and Altra voce (1999): the electronic music and technical part of such pieces was always performed by the musicians of Tempo Reale.

=== Sacher ===
Along with eleven other composers, (Conrad Beck, Pierre Boulez, Benjamin Britten, Henri Dutilleux, Wolfgang Fortner, Alberto Ginastera, Cristóbal Halffter, Hans Werner Henze, Heinz Holliger, Klaus Huber and Witold Lutosławski), Berio was asked by the cellist Mstislav Rostropovich to celebrate the Swiss conductor Paul Sacher's 70th birthday by composing a solo cello piece using the letters of Sacher's name (eS, A, C, H, E, Re). This was published under the name 12 Hommages à Paul Sacher. Berio's piece is called Les mots sont allés (The Words Are Gone). Some of the resulting compositions were performed in Zurich on 2 May 1976 and the whole "Sacher" project was first performed completely by Czech cellist František Brikcius in Prague in 2011.

=== Sequenza ===
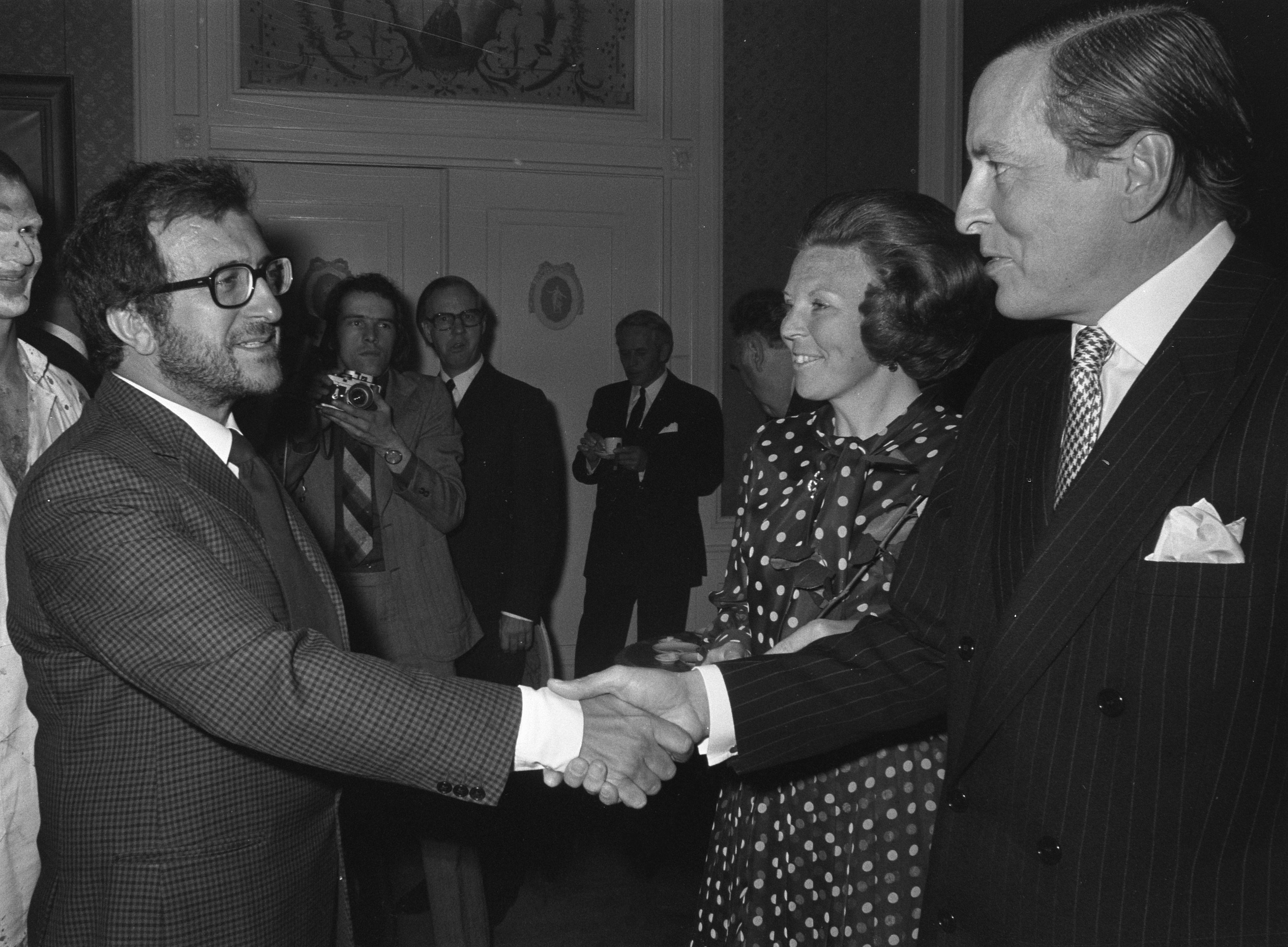
Berio meets Princess Beatrix and Prince Claus of the Netherlands in the Hague in 1972.

Berio composed a series of virtuoso works for solo instruments under the name Sequenza. The first, Sequenza I came in 1958 and is for flute; the last, Sequenza XIV (2002) is for cello. These works explore the full possibilities of each instrument, often calling for extended techniques.

The various Sequenze are as follows:

- Sequenza I for flute (1958);
- Sequenza II for harp (1963);
- Sequenza III for woman's voice (1966);
- Sequenza IV for piano (1966);
- Sequenza V for trombone (1966);
- Sequenza VI for viola (1967);
- Sequenza VII for oboe (1969) (rev. by Jacqueline Leclair and renamed Sequenza VIIa in 2000);
- Sequenza VIIb for soprano saxophone (adaptation by Claude Delangle in 1993);
- Sequenza VIII for violin (1976);
- Sequenza IXa for clarinet (1980);
- Sequenza IXb for alto saxophone (adaptation by the composer in 1981);
- Sequenza IXc for bass clarinet (adaptation by Rocco Parisi in 1998);
- Sequenza X for trumpet in C and piano resonance (1984);
- Sequenza XI for guitar (1987–88);
- Sequenza XII for bassoon (1995);
- Sequenza XIII for accordion "Chanson" (1995);
- Sequenza XIV for cello (2002);
- Sequenza XIVb for double bass (adaptation by Stefano Scodanibbio in 2004).

=== Stage works ===
- Opera (1970, revised 1977)
- La vera storia (1982)
- Un re in ascolto (1984)
- Vor, während, nach Zaide (1995; prelude, interlude and ending for an opera fragment by Mozart)
- Outis (1996)
- Cronaca del luogo (1999)
- Turandot (2001; ending for the Puccini opera)

=== Transcriptions and arrangements ===
Berio is known for adapting and transforming the music of others, but he also adapted his own compositions: the series of Sequenze gave rise to a series of works called Chemins each based on one of the Sequenze. Chemins II (1967), for instance, takes the original Sequenza VI (1967) for viola and adapts it for solo viola and nine other instruments. Chemins II was itself transformed into Chemins III (1968) by the addition of an orchestra, and there also exists Chemins IIb, a version of Chemins II without the solo viola but with a larger ensemble, and Chemins IIc, which is Chemins IIb with an added solo bass clarinet. The Sequenze were also shaped into new works under titles other than Chemins; Corale (1981), for example, is based on Sequenza VIII.

As well as original works, Berio made a number of arrangements of works by other composers, among them Claudio Monteverdi, Henry Purcell, Johannes Brahms, Gustav Mahler and Kurt Weill. For Berberian he wrote Folk Songs (1964; a set of arrangements of folk songs). He also wrote an ending for Puccini's Turandot (premiered in Las Palmas on 24 January 2002 and in the same year in Los Angeles, Amsterdam and Salzburg) and in Rendering (1989) took the few sketches Franz Schubert made for his Symphony No. 10 and completed them by adding music derived from other Schubert works.

Transcription is a vital part of even Berio's original works. In "Two Interviews", Berio mused about what a college course in transcription would look like, looking not only at Franz Liszt, Ferruccio Busoni, Stravinsky, Johann Sebastian Bach, himself, and others, but to what extent composition is always self-transcription. In this respect, Berio rejected and distanced himself from notions of collage, preferring instead the position of "transcriber", arguing that "collage" implies a certain arbitrary abandon that runs counter to the careful control of his highly intellectual play, especially within Sinfonia but throughout his "deconstructive" works. Rather, each quotation carefully evokes the context of its original work, creating an open web, but an open web with highly specific referents and a vigorously defined, if self-proliferating, signifier-signified relationship. "I'm not interested in collages, and they amuse me only when I'm doing them with my children: then they become an exercise in relativizing and 'decontextualizing' images, an elementary exercise whose healthy cynicism won't do anyone any harm", Berio told interviewer Rossana Dalmonte.

Perhaps Berio's most notable contribution to the world of post-WWII non-serial experimental music, running throughout most of his works, is his engagement with the broader world of critical theory (epitomized by his lifelong friendship with linguist and critical theorist Umberto Eco) through his compositions. Berio's works are often analytic acts: deliberately analysing myths, stories, the components of words themselves, his own compositions, or preexisting musical works. In other words, it is not only the composition of the collage that conveys meaning; it is the particular composition of the component "sound-image" that conveys meaning, even extra-musical meaning. The technique of the collage, that he is associated with, is, then, less a neutral process than a conscious, Joycean process of analysis-by-composition, a form of analytic transcription of which Sinfonia and the Chemins are the most prominent examples. Berio often offers his compositions as forms of academic or cultural discourse themselves rather than as "mere" fodder for them.

Among Berio's other compositions are Circles (1960), Sequenza III (1966), and Recital I (for Cathy) (1972), all written for Berberian, and a number of stage works, with Un re in ascolto, a collaboration with Italo Calvino, the best known.

Berio's "central instrumental focus" is probably with the voice, the piano, the flute, and the strings. He wrote many remarkable pieces for piano which vary from solo pieces to essentially concerto pieces (Points on the curve to find; Concerto for two pianos; and Coro, which has a strong backbone of harmonic and melodic material entirely based on the piano part).

Lesser known works make use of a very distinguishable polyphony unique to Berio that develops in a variety of ways. This occurs in several works, but most recognisably in compositions for small instrumental combinations. Examples are Différences, for flute, harp, clarinet, cello, violin and electronic sounds, Agnus, for three clarinets and voices, Tempi concertanti for flute and four instrumental groups, Linea, for marimba, vibraphone, and two pianos, and Chemins IV, for eleven strings and oboe, as well as Canticum novissimi testamenti for 8 voices, 4 clarinets and saxophone quartet.

== Honours ==
- 1989: Ernst von Siemens Music Prize
- 1991: Wolf Prize in Arts
- 1994: Knight Grand Cross of the Order of Merit of the Italian Republic
- 1996: Praemium Imperiale
