= Chants d'Auvergne, Vol. 1 =

- CBS Masterworks CD: MK 37299

Studio album by Frederica von Stade
- Released: 1982
- Studio: Abbey Road Studios, London
- Genre: Classical vocal
- Length: 51:22
- Language: Occitan
- Label: CBS Masterworks
- Producer: David Mottley

Frederica von Stade: Chants d'Auvergne, Vol. 1 is a 51-minute studio album presenting seventeen of the thirty traditional Auvergnat songs collected and arranged by Joseph Canteloube, performed by von Stade and the Royal Philharmonic Orchestra under the direction of Antonio de Almeida. It was released in 1982. The same artists recorded the rest of Canteloube's Auvergne songs and three mélodies of his own composition for a sequel album, Frederica von Stade: Chants d'Auvergne, Vol. 2, released in 1986.

== Recording ==
The album was recorded digitally using a JVC system on 14–18 June 1982 in EMI's Abbey Road Studios, London. It was mastered at the CBS Recording Studios in New York City with CBS's DisComputer system.

== Packaging ==
The cover of the album features a photograph of von Stade taken by Valérie Clément on the front of the sleeve, and a black and white photograph of Antonio de Almeida with Canteloube's son Guy on the back.

== Critical reception ==
=== Reviews ===
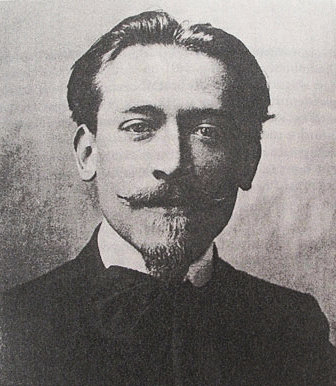
Joseph Canteloube

J. B. Steane reviewed the album on LP in Gramophone in February 1983, comparing it with earlier recordings of Canteloube's songs performed by Netania Davrath and Victoria de los Angeles. Each of the three singers had points of advantage, he thought. Davrath's "girl-like, virginal voice" brought "a breath of fresh air and a ... pastoral feeling". De los Angeles sang with plenty of body in her tone and was enjoyably animated in the sprightlier songs. Her "L'aïo dè rotso", for example, had "a sense of fun and engaging cheekiness". What distinguished von Stade's way with Canteloube was "the special character of [her] tone and artistry in the quieter songs. She is utterly personal and lovely in the lullabies, especially "Brezairola", in the sad plaining of "Oï, ayaï" and in the delicate lilt of "Lo fïolaré"." Von Stade's album had further plus points in the excellent playing of the Royal Philharmonic Orchestra, and in engineering which provided a "greater clarity of detail" than could be heard on the older discs (albeit at the expense of allowing the orchestra undue prominence in those songs in which Canteloube's arranging was at its lushest). Where von Stade's LP disappointed was in Antonio de Almeida's conducting. His conspicuously slow tempos had created an "excessively laid-back atmosphere" in which the songs did not so much luxuriate as wallow. His "La delaïssádo", for instance, took 5'18" as opposed to de los Angeles's 4'24", his "Passo del prat" 3'36" rather than her 2'59" and his "Brezairola" 3'24" rather than her 2'54". De Almeida's pacing had made it unnecessarily difficult for von Stade to sculpt the phrasing of "La delaïssádo" as well as de los Angeles had done, and had sapped "Passo del prat" of the energy with which the Spanish soprano had invested it. In sum, the album had "much to enjoy" and was "lovely in parts", but was still "rather a disappointment in toto". It was the kind of disc that one might be reluctant to buy for oneself, but which would be a very welcome gift beneath the Christmas tree.

Steane revisited the album in Gramophone in March 1983, comparing it with a new recording of the Chants d'Auvergne performed by Kiri Te Kanawa. Returning to von Stade's disc, he wrote, he was "more moved than before by the quiet but often intense personal quality in her singing. That particularly touching song, "La delaïssádo", has its tenderness and sadness caught with a delicate poignancy by von Stade, in a manner quite personal to that singer." Te Kanawa's disc was glorious, but "for those who like their vacances vertes cool and shady, the von Stade record may still be the one."

David Hall reviewed the album on LP in Stereo Review in June 1983, comparing it with Natalia Davrath's and Victoria de los Angeles's versions and also with an LP of eight of the Auvergnat songs recorded by Madeleine Grey in the 1930s. Frederica von Stade was successful, he thought, in the cradle songs "Brezairola" and "Per l'efan". In her bourrées, she conveyed the vivacity of "Tè, l'co, tè" and "Obal, din lou Limouzi", but her versions of "L'aïo dè rotso" and "Lo calhé" did not have the "snap and rhythmic vigour" that Grey had found in them. In "Passo del prat" and in some of the other slower songs, "her readings [bordered] on the lethargic". Antonio de Almeida's conducting had both virtues and vices. With the help of the Royal Philharmonic and CBS's engineers, he had elicited "the greatest possible range and richness of colour" from Canteloube's lavish orchestrations. But in doing so, he had to some extent "[vitiated] the essential rhythmic vitality and linear clarity" of his material. All in all, von Stade's disc had too many faults amidst its beauties to be judged unequivocally better than its predecessors.

In the October 1997 issue of Gramophone, Richard T. Fairman used a compilation CD of most of Frederica von Stade's Auvergnat songs as a reference disc when reviewing a new CD of the Chants d'Auvergne performed by Dawn Upshaw, the Orchestre de l'Opéra de Lyon and Kent Nagano. The von Stade anthology was one that he had long been fond of. It presented her performances of the most familiar of Canteloube's songs in renditions that were free of eccentricity. "Von Stade varies her tone according to the sense of each song," he wrote, "but the overall mood is less sharp, more comfortable if you like, than with Upshaw." Moreover, von Stade's Royal Philharmonic provided a more sumptuous backdrop than Upshaw's Lyon orchestra. Collectors tempted by Upshaw's album would "probably find that the consoling romanticism of [von Stade's] tried-and-trusted disc [was] more what they had in mind."

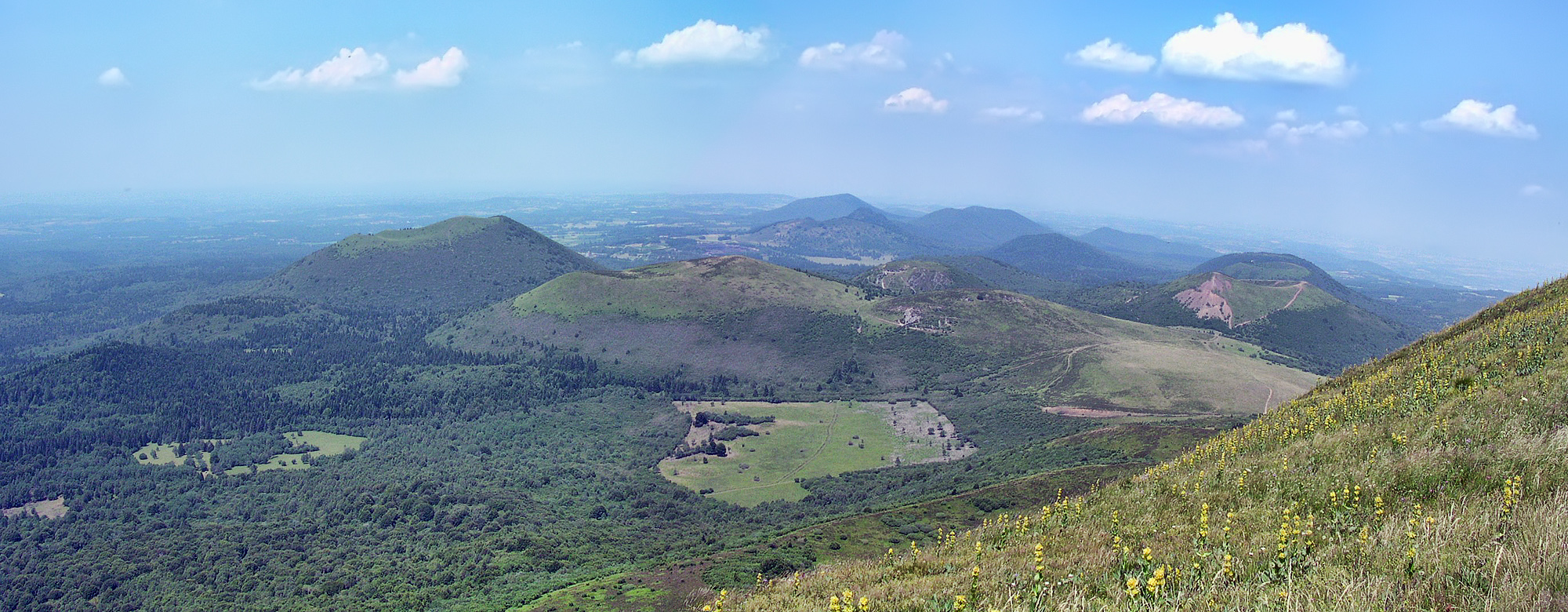
The Chaîne des Puys in Puy-de-Dôme, part of the countryside where the Chants d'Auvergne originated

Writing in Opera News in December 2016, David Shengold mentioned the album in the course of reviewing a box set of Frederica von Stade's recordings in which it was included: "[Von Stade's] two luminous discs of orchestrated Canteloube songs ... would be on anyone's list of essential traversals."

Frederica von Stade's approach to the Chants d'Auvergne was also critiqued in the 1988 edition of The new Penguin guide to compact discs and cassettes, which judged that "Fine as Frederica von Stade's singing is, she is stylistically and temperamentally far less at home in Canteloube's lovely folksong settings than Victoria de los Angeles, Kiri Te Kanawa or Jill Gomez".

=== Accolade ===
The album won a Grand Prix du Disque in 1982.

== CD track listing ==
Joseph Canteloube (1879–1957), collector and arranger

Chants d'Auvergne (1923–1930)

- 1 (6:27) Baïlèro (Vol. 1, No. 2)
- 2 (3:09) Oï, ayaï (Vol. 4, No. 2)
- 3 (5:20) La delaïssádo (Vol. 2, No. 4)
- 4 (3:41) Passo del prat (Vol. 3, No. 2)
- 5 (0:45) Tè, l'co, tè! (Vol. 5, No. 6)
- 6 (2:59) Per l'efan (Vol. 4, No. 3)
- 7 (5:27) Deux bourrées: (a) N'aï pas ïèu dè mio; (b) Lo calhé (Vol. 2, No. 5)
- 8 (1:36) Lou coucut (Vol. 4, No. 6)
- 9 (4:06) L'Antouèno (Vol. 2, No. 2)
- 10 (1:56) Chut, chut (Vol. 4, No. 4)
- 11 (3:29) Brezairola (Vol. 3, No. 4)
- 12 (3:13) Uno jionto pastouro (Vol. 5, No. 7)
- 13 (1:52) Lo fiolairé (Vol. 3, No. 1)
- 14 (6:44) Trois bourrées: (a) L'aïo dè rotso; (b) Oun'onorèn gorda; (c) Obal, din lou Limouzi (Vol. 1, No. 3)

== Personnel ==
=== Musical ===
- Frederica von Stade, mezzo-soprano
- Royal Philharmonic Orchestra
- Antonio de Almeida (1928–1997), conductor

=== Other ===
- David Mottley, producer
- Peter Brown, engineer

== Release history ==
On 1 November 1982, CBS Masterworks issued the album on LP (catalogue number IM 37299), with anonymous notes (possibly written by Barry Laurence Scherer, who supplied those for von Stade's second Auvergnat album) and with an insert with texts and translations. The album was also issued on cassette (catalogue number 40-37299).

Shortly afterwards, CBS Masterworks issued the album on CD (catalogue number MK 37299), with a 28-page booklet of notes, texts and translations. In 1997, Sony issued a compilation CD (catalogue number SBK 63063) that included a selection of songs from the album and its sequel. In 2014, Newton Classics issued the album coupled with its sequel in their 2-CD set Chants d'Auvergne. In 2016, Sony issued the album on CD (in a miniature replica of the sleeve of the original LP) with a 52-page booklet in their 18-CD collection Frederica von Stade: The Complete Columbia Recital Albums (catalogue number 88875183412).
