= Black Is the Color of My True Love's Hair =

American traditional song

"Black Is the Color (of My True Love's Hair)" (Roud 3103) is a traditional ballad folk song known in the US as associated with colonial and later music in the Appalachian Mountains. It is believed to have originated in Scotland, as it refers to the River Clyde in the lyrics. American musicologist Alan Lomax supported the thesis of Scottish origin, saying that the song was an American "re-make of British materials."

== Different versions ==
Many different versions of this song exist, some addressed to men and others addressed to women. There are other differences:

- ...like some rosy fair... or ...like a rose so fair... or ... something wondrous fair
- ...the prettiest face and the neatest hands... or ...the sweetest face and the gentlest hands... or ...the clearest eyes and the strongest hands
- ...still I hope the time will come... or ...some times I wish the day will come... or ... I shall count my life as well begun, when he and I shall be as one.
- ...you and I shall be as one... or ...s/he and I can be as one...

These words are set to two distinct melodies, one of which is traditional and the other was written by the Kentucky folk singer and composer John Jacob Niles by 1941. Niles recalled that his father thought the traditional melody was "downright terrible", so he wrote "a new tune, ending it in a nice modal manner." This melody was used in the Folk Songs song cycle by Luciano Berio.

The song has become a part of the traditional repertory of Celtic music artists. The song was collected as "Black is the color" by Cecil Sharp and Maud Karpeles in 1916 from Mrs Lizzie Roberts, it is listed in English folk songs from the southern Appalachians (1917). It also appeared in Sharps English Folksongs From The Southern Appalachians (1932). In the 1960s, Patty Waters sang an extended version for an ESP record that leaned toward the avant garde and extremes of vocal improvisation.

== Recorded versions ==
Versions of the song have been recorded by many artists, including:

Name	Album	Genre	Year	Comments
John Jacob Niles	American Folk Lore Vol. 3		1941	Also appears on American Folk Love Songs to Dulcimer Accompaniment, Six Favorite Folk Songs and other Niles compilations.
Burl Ives	Wayfaring Stranger	Traditional folk	1944	
Jo Stafford	American Folk Songs	Traditional folk	1950	
Jean Ritchie	Singing the Traditional Songs of Her Kentucky Mountain Family	Traditional folk	1952	
Gordon Heath & Lee Payant	Chants traditionnels des États-Unis / The Ballad of the Boll Weevil and Other Traditional Songs of the United States	Traditional folk	1955	
Robert Shaw Chorale	My True Love Sings	Traditional folk	1956	
Phineas Newborn, Jr.	While My Lady Sleeps	Jazz	1957	
Pete Seeger	American Favorite Ballads, Vol. 2	Folk music	1958	
Alfred Deller	Western Wind	English folk songs	1959	"Reviews and Ratings of Popular Albums", Billboard, 2/2/1959, p. 39
Nina Simone	Nina Simone at Town Hall	Jazz	1959	Nina Simone made it part of her standard repertoire, revitalizing the song's popularity.
Joan Baez	Joan Baez in Concert	Folk music	1962	
Smothers Brothers	Think Ethnic	Folk	1963	Title line turned into "Black Is the Colour of My Love's True Hair" [But only her Hairdresser knows--/("Does she or Doesn't she?")--/Only her Hairdresser knows!] (a play on the advertising 'tag line' at that time for Clairol hair-coloring products).
Davy Graham	Folk, Blues and Beyond	Folk	1964	
Smothers Brothers	It Must Have Been Something I Said!	Folk	1964	(They also did a parody version, cf. 1963)
Nina Simone	Wild Is the Wind	Jazz	1965	
Patty Waters	Patty Waters Sings	Jazz	1965	Described as "the performance that established her as a vocal innovator"
Hamish Imlach	Hamish Imlach	Folk	1966	
Carola	Carola & Heikki Sarmanto Trio	Jazz	1966	Recorded in the spirit of the modal jazz scene in Europe in the 1960s, Carola's accosting tone and the groovy approach of the Heikki Sarmanto Trio remained undiscovered until issued by the Jazzpuu label in 2004.
The Throb	non-album single	Garage rock	1966	Reached No. 42 on Australian singles chart
The Human Beinz	Nobody But Me		1968	A version by US act
Cathy Berberian	Folk Songs	Classical	1968	Recorded with the Berio setting, followed by two more recordings next decade, all conducted by the composer to whom she was married for a time
Mike Seeger	Music from True Vine	Folk	1971	This a capella recording was done on his solo album of Appalachian and America folk music on the Mercury label
Tia Blake	Folk Songs & Ballads: Tia Blake and Her Folk-Group	Folk	1971	Released on SFPP (Société Française De Productions Phonographiques)
Alfred Deller, Desmond Dupré, Mark Deller	Folksongs	Classical	1972	
Christy Moore	Live in Dublin	Folk	1978	
Masayuki Takayanagi	Lonely Woman	Jazz	1982	Electric guitar cover with improvisation solos.
Marc Johnson's Bass Desires	Bass Desires	Jazz rock	1985	Instrumental version featuring guitarists Bill Frisell and John Scofield
Sinéad O'Connor			1990	
Joe Sample	Invitation	Jazz	1993	Instrumental version recorded as "Black Is the Color". This version has been featured on The Weather Channel's Local on the 8s segments.
Luka Bloom	Turf	Folk/Singer-songwriter	1994	
Christy Moore	Live at the Point	Folk	1994	
The Irish Descendants	Livin' on the Edge	Folk, World, & Country	1996	
The Eccentric Opera	HIMNE		1997	
Kendra Shank	Wish	Vocal jazz	1998	
Susan McKeown	Mighty Rain	Traditional folk	1998	
Judy Collins	Both Sides Now		1998	
Seanchai and the Unity Squad	Rebel Hip Hop		1998	Female-addressed version with a different lyrics titled "Ballad of Mairead Farrell"
Fred Hersch	Let Yourself Go (Live at Jordan Hall)	Jazz	1999	
Niamh Parsons	In My Prime	Traditional folk	2000	Also performed on Live at Fylde (2005)
Stringmansassy	Persuasion		2000	
Gaelic Storm	Tree	Folk rock	2001	Sixth track of the album Tree. Female-addressed version
The Liberty Voices	A Cappella Americana		2001	As seen at Epcot's American Adventure
Cara Dillon	Cara Dillon	Folk	2001	Irish folk singer Cara Dillon chose to perform a female-addressed version opening her eponymous album which won her many awards including "Best Traditional Song" at the 2002 BBC Folk Awards. It has become a favourite in her live repertoire and has undergone huge success as a Trance remix by 2Devine (see below)
Andreas Scholl	Wayfaring Stranger	Classical	2001	
Blue Mountain	Roots	Alternative country/roots rock	2002	
Grace Griffith	Sands of Time		2003	
Larry Mathews	Easy and Slow	Folk	2003	Third track on the Album Easy and Slow
Nurse with Wound	She and Me Fall Together in Free Death	Experimental	2003	
Ensemble Planeta	Aria	A capella	2003	Tenth track of the Aria Album
Paul Weller	Studio 150	Rock	2004	
2Devine featuring Cara Dillon		House	2005	DJ Pete Devine (also known as 2Devine and Coco & Green) produced a trance remix to Cara Dillon's version.
The Corrs	Home	Pop folk	2005	
Espers	The Weed Tree	Psychedelic folk	2005	
The Czars	Sorry I Made You Cry	Rock	2006	Male-addressed version by American rock band
The Twilight Singers	She Loves You	Rock	2007	Female-addressed version
Karan Casey	Ships in the Forest	Folk	2008	Acoustic piano version by Karan Casey, an Irish folk singer
The King's Singers	Simple Gifts	Classical/Folk	2008	A capella
Kokia	Fairy Dance: Kokia Meets Ireland	Celtic folk	2008	Female-addressed version by Japanese songstress.
Natacha Atlas	Ana Hina	Arabesque/World	2008	Male-addressed version with the Mazeeka Ensemble
Angelo Kelly	Lost Sons Up Close	Pop rock	2008	Appears as the last track in Lost Sons and was also recorded live for Up Close
Julie Murphy	Black Mountains Revisited	Folk/Singer-songwriter	2009	
Nyle Wolfe	Home Ground	Folk/Classical	2009	
Wye Oak	Splice Today Presents: The Old Lonesome Sound	Folk	2009	An original compilation album
Phil Coulter	Timeless Tranquility: 20 Year Celebration	Folk Celtic Classical	2008	
Marc Gunn	Irish Drinking Songs: A Cat Lover's Companion	Folk	2007	Album was a followup of Irish Drinking Songs for Cat Lovers which included the track "Black Is the Color (of My Cat's Fur)" based on this song.
Angel Olsen	Lady of the Waterpark	Indie Folk	2010	Limited cassette-only release
Lisa Lambe	Celtic Woman: Believe	Celtic folk	2011	Female-addressed version
Katherine Jenkins	Daydream	Classical-popular crossover	2011	Male-addressed version
Celtic Thunder	Heritage	Celtic folk	2011	
Mark Stewart & Richard H. Kirk	The Politics of Envy	Rock, dub	2012	Bonus track on the iTunes version of the album
Siobhan Owen	Storybook Journey	Folk Celtic Classical-popular crossover	2012	Male-addressed version, vocal and harp
Blair Dunlop	Blight and Blossom	Folk	2012	
Arborea	Red Planet	Psych-Folk	2011	
Anne Janelle	So Long at The Fair		2013	
Brian McFadden	The Irish Connection	Soft rock	2013	featuring Sinéad O'Connor
Méav Ní Mhaolchatha	The Calling	Folk	2013	Male-addressed version
Shearwater	N/A	Indie rock	2014	Male-addressed version, later verses are rewritten.
Body/Head	Coming Apart	Noise Rock	2013	Re-titled Black
Gregory Porter	Autour de Nina	Jazz	2014	Female-addressed version
Peter Hollens & Avi Kaplan	Peter Hollens	Folk	2014	Female-addressed version
The Bombadils	Grassy Roads, Wandering Feet	Folk	2015	
Coppelius	Hertzmaschine	Metal	2015	
Rhiannon Giddens	Tomorrow Is My Turn	Americana	2015	
Damien Leith	Songs from Ireland		2015	
Lauryn Hill	Nina Revisited... - A Tribute to Nina Simone		2015	
Youn Sun Nah	She Moves On		2017	
Bill Frisell and Mary Halvorson	The Maid with the Flaxen Hair	Avant-garde / Classical guitar	2018	Arranged for two guitars and performed by Frisell and Halvorson.
Nicole Cabell and Alyson Cambridge	Sisters in Song	Classical	2018	Arranged for two voices and orchestra by Joe Clark
Luka Bloom	Luka Bloom Live at De Roma	Folk	2020	Recorded live at De Roma, Antwerp, 16 November 2019 and included on "Luka Bloom - Live at De Roma" (2020)
The Body and Big Brave	Leaving None But Small Birds	Experimental / Folk	2021	Collaboration album featuring reinterpretations of traditional folk songs.
Susu Laroche	Venus Rising From The Sea	Sufi gospel	2024	Compilation track
Stephen Molyneux	The Wind Is the Asking	Folk	2024	

== Settings ==
- 1964 – Luciano Berio – Folk Songs

== Pop culture references ==
"Black Is The Color" is featured, sung to calm down the horses in Tombstone Territory season 3 episode 28 entitled "The Governor" aka on imda "The Reception", which aired on April 16, 1960.

"Black Is the Color" is featured in The Twilight Zone season 3 episode entitled "The Passersby", which aired on October 6, 1961.

"Black Is The Color" is featured in the 1962 pilot for the western TV series Gallaway House, starring Johnny Cash, Merle Travis, Karen Downs and Eddie Dean.

"Black is the Color" is featured in The Flame and the Flower by Kathleen E. Woodiwiss. A sailor sings it to Heather as she and her new husband, Brandon Birmingham, pass by on the way to an inn before leaving London.

The "Lover's Lament" / "Love's Jewels" lyrics sung in Anne Bishop's Tir Alainn book series are loosely based on this song.

A cover of the song by Jim Moray featured on the Class season 1 finale "The Lost", appearing in both the post credit opening and closing fight sequence.

A cover of the song by Cara Dillon featured on Derry Girls (2018 TV series) season 3, episode 4 'The Haunting' ending sequence.
