= Lo Fiolairé =

Traditional Occitan song

Lo fiolairé
- Genre: folk
- Text: anonymous
- Language: Auvergnat
- Performed: Madeleine Grey; Victoria de los Ángeles; Cathy Berberian; Kiri Te Kanawa; Luisa Castellani; Frederica von Stade

"Lo Fiolairé" (occitan la fialaire, the spinner) is a traditional Occitan song, from the region of Aurillac and Haute-Auvergne, composed by an anonymous author in the Occitan language.

== History and content ==
The piece was recovered by the composer Joseph Canteloube between 1923 and 1930 and inserted in the collection Chants d'Auvergne (Songs from Auvergne), where he transcribed it with arrangement for soprano and orchestra. In 1964 Luciano Berio transcribed the piece in turn, with an arrangement for voice (mezzo-soprano), flute, clarinet, harp, percussion, viola and cello. The musical piece was included in the song cycle Folk Songs collection and was recorded by his Armenian wife, Cathy Berberian.

It is a canso, a poetic composition, composed of twelve lines (four triplets, the rhymes are identical in all the stanzas; there is also the rima estamp, which is found in the same place from verse to verse (coblas unisonans).

The song tells the story of a shepherdess who remembers that when she was very young, while she was looking after the flock, she also had a stick to spin and had called a shepherd to help her, but he in return asked him for a kiss and she, who was not an ungrateful one, he gave her two.

== Other versions ==
- Arleen Auger
- Sara Macliver
- Netania Davrath
- Sarah Davis
- Albena Kechlibareva
- Orna Arania
- Dawn Upshaw
- Véronique Gens

== Discography ==
- 1964, Luciano Berio, Folk Songs
- 2005, Osvaldo Golijov in the CD Ayre, with Dawn Upshaw & The Andalucian Dogs, Deutsche Grammophon GmbH, Hamburg
