= Ayre (Golijov) =

Composition by Argentinian composer Osvaldo Golijov

- studio album by Osvaldo Golijov
- Period: Contemporary classical music
- Genre: folk
- Performed: studio
- Published: sept. 27, 2005
- Publisher: Deutsche Grammophon CD 00289 477 5414
- Duration: 61:57 minutes
- Movements: 11
- Scoring: Orchestra, chorus and soloists

«Ayre is a collection of 11 pieces of music with roots in Spanish Andalusia – Byzantine chant, Sephardic lullabies, Arab, Hebrew and Christian texts – an ecstatic demonstration of the power of music to express the human condition. It may be one of the defining works of the new century» ( Robert Harris)

Ayre is the twelfth album by composer Osvaldo Golijov, it is a cycle of songs commissioned by Carnegie Hall for soprano Dawn Upshaw, which offers a tour of the Mediterranean, particularly in that mixture of Spanish, Jewish and Arabic influences that once coexisted (relatively ) quietly in Spain before the Reconquista.

Golijov's Ayre – meaning "air" or "melody" in medieval Spanish – largely centers on southern Spain with its intermingling of three cultures (Christian, Arab, and Jewish) in an era before the expulsion of the Jews in the late 15th century.

The band on the CD box is a bit imprecise, in fact it defines the work as a journey around the Jewish Mediterranean; but in reality there are Arabic, Christian, Muslim, etc. songs and poems. It would seem that Golijov wants to show that all these faiths and ethnicities make up a larger family.

== Structure ==
The CD is composed of two parts, the first Ayre by Osvaldo Golijov and the second Folk Songs for mezzo-soprano, flute, clarinet, viola, cello, harp and percussion by Luciano Berio.

The first part Ayre (for voice and orchestra) the pieces are all performed by the soprano Dawn Upshaw accompanied by the orchestra The Andalucian Dogs.

In the second part Folk Songs (for voice and seven instruments) the soprano Dawn Upshaw is accompanied by Helen Tara O'Connor, Todd Palmer, Ljova, Erik Friedlander, Bridget Kibbey, Eric Poland and Gordon Gottlieb.

In addition to the instruments mentioned in the pieces Tancas serradas a muru (Sardinian) and "Wa Habibi" (Arabic) a laptop programmed with electronica "beat" was used to provide a rhythmic driving background.

- Part I
1. Ayre by Osvaldo Golijov
  1. Mananita de San Juan (Morning of St. John's Day) - 3:54
  2. Una Madre Comió Asado (A Mother Roasted her Child) - 3:01
  3. Tancas serradas a muru (Walls are Encircling the Land) - (trad. Sardinia, lyrics by Melchiorre Murenu)- 2:57
  4. Luna - 2:04
  5. Nanni - 3:15
  6. Wa Habibi (My Love) - 6:15
  7. Aiini Taqttiru (My Eyes Weep) - 2:47
  8. Kun Li-Guitari Wataran Ayyuha Al-Maa' (Be a String, Water, to my Guitar) - 1:14
  9. Kun Li-Guitari Wataran Ayyuha Al-Maa' (Be a String, Water, to my Guitar) - 1:40
  10. Yah, Anna Emtzacha (Oh, Where Shall I find You?) - 3:44
  11. Ariadna en su Laberinto (Ariadne in Her Labyrinth) - 9:15
- Part II
12. from Folk Songs by Luciano Berio
  1. Black is the colour (United States) - 2:42
  2. I Wonder As I Wander (United States) - 2:06
  3. Loosin yelav (Armenia) -2:35
  4. Rossignolet du bois - (France) - 1:28
  5. A la femminisca - (Sicily) - 1:32
  6. La donna ideale - (Liguria, Italy) - 1:17
  7. Ballo - (Italia)- 1:34
  8. Motettu de tristura - (Sardinia)- 1:53
  9. Malurous qu'o un fenno - (Auvergne)- 1:00
  10. Lo fiolairé - (Auvergne)- 2:56
  11. Azerbaijan Love Song (Qalalıyam) - (Azerbaijan)- 2:48

== Critical reception ==
Ayre was met with positive reviews across the board upon its first release, both as an album and as an original composition. Freddy Domingez praised Miriam Khalil's performance on a recent recording in an article for Opera Wire, stating:

«Miriam Khalil is clearly at home in European and a range of other musical traditions. Her performance on this album shows her to be more than a singer: she is an elemental force. There are no missteps here as each song is performed with dramatic depth, a nuanced understanding of the range of emotions and tones required by poetry and music.»

British novelist Robert Harris wrote highly about the composition in an article for Globe and Mail, where he described the work as

«...a collection of 11 pieces of music with roots in Spanish Andalusia – Byzantine chant, Sephardic lullabies, Arab, Hebrew and Christian texts – an ecstatic demonstration of the power of music to express the human condition. It may be one of the defining works of the new century»

Renowned music critic Alex Ross dedicated a section of his best seller The Rest is Noise to Ayre, writing:

«a multicultural tour-de-force that weaves together the sounds of Moorish Spain»
