= Folk Songs (Berio) =

Song cycle by Luciano Berio

- Song cycle by Luciano Berio
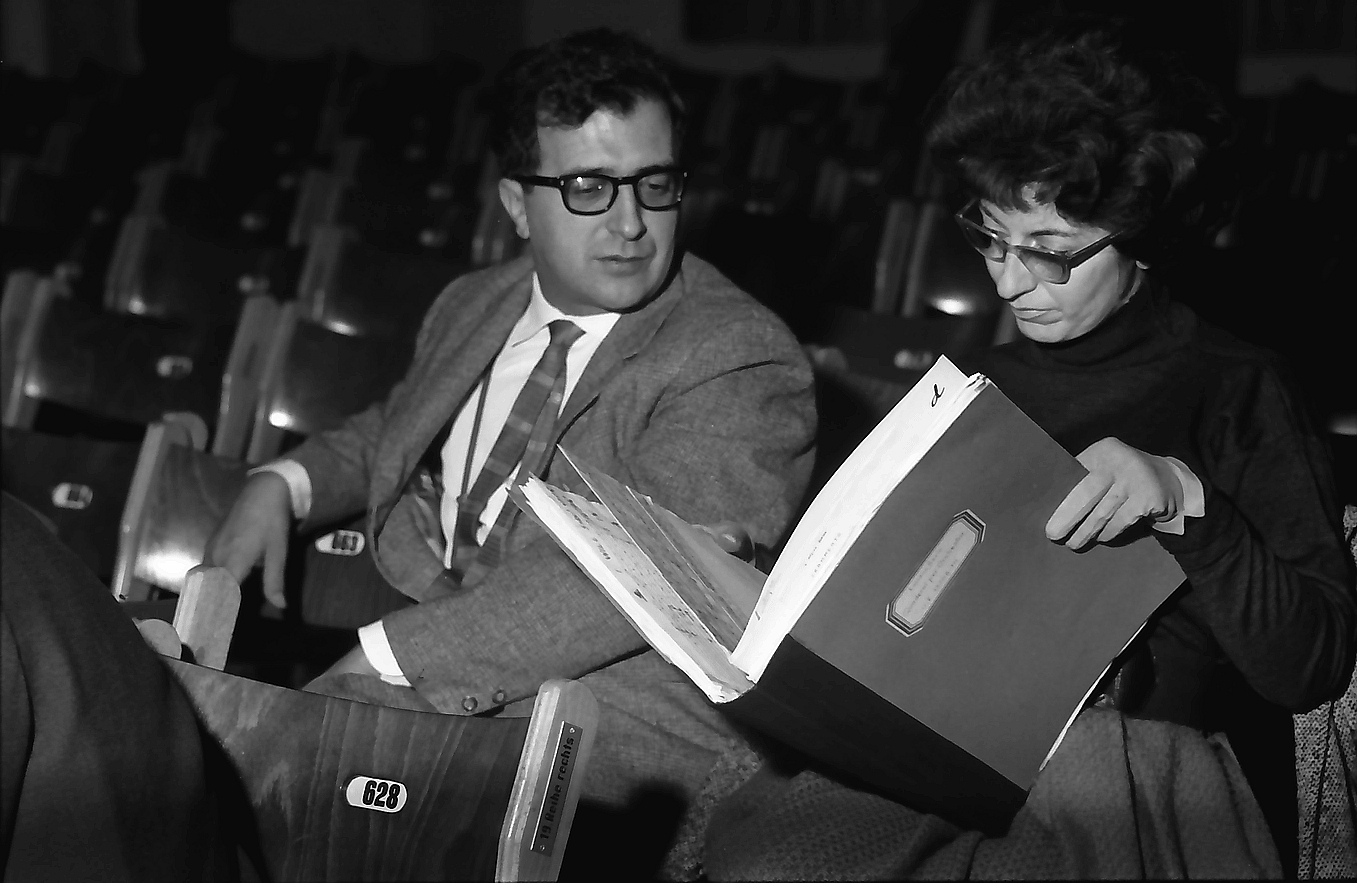
- Berio and Berberian at the Donaueschingen Festival, 1962
- Text: folk songs
- Composed: 1964
- Performed: 1964
- Movements: 11
- Scoring: voice; flute (doubling on piccolo); clarinet; harp; viola; cello; percussion

Folk Songs is a song cycle by Luciano Berio composed in 1964. It consists of arrangements of folk music from various countries and other songs, forming "a tribute to the extraordinary artistry" of the American singer Cathy Berberian, a specialist in Berio's music. It is scored for voice, flute (doubling on piccolo), clarinet, harp, viola, cello, and percussion (two players). The composer arranged it for a large orchestra in 1973.

== Background ==
Two of the songs in the cycle, "La donna ideale" and "Ballo", were composed in 1947 by Berio during his second year at the Milan Conservatory for voice and piano as part of his Tre canzoni popolari (Three folk songs). It is often claimed that these three songs were written for Cathy Berberian while she was studying in Italy, but this cannot be the case because she did not arrive there until 1949.

The Folk Songs cycle was commissioned by Mills College in California and first performed there by a chamber orchestra directed by Berio in 1964 with Berberian as the soprano soloist. By the time of its first performance, the Berberian–Berio marriage was nearing its end, but their artistic partnership continued; they subsequently collaborated on works such as Sequenza III, Visage, and Recital I (for Cathy). Berio had an emotional attachment to folk song: he once declared that "When I work with that music I am always caught by the thrill of discovery." Other later compositions by Berio that incorporated folk songs were Cries of London, Coro and Voci: Folk Songs II.

== Songs ==
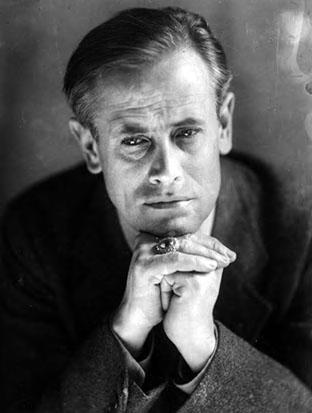
John Jacob Niles, who wrote two of the folk songs

The full list of songs in the cycle is as follows:

1. "Black Is the Colour" (John Jacob Niles, USA)
2. "I Wonder as I Wander" (John Jacob Niles, USA)
3. "Loosin yelav" (Armenia)
4. "Rossignolet du bois" (France)
5. "A la femminisca" (Sicily, Italy)
6. "La donna ideale" (Luciano Berio, Italy)
7. "Ballo" (Luciano Berio, Italy)
8. "Motettu de tristura" (Sardinia)
9. "Malurous qu'o uno fenno" (Auvergne, France)
10. "Lo fiolairé" (Auvergne, France)
11. "Azerbaijan Love Song" (Azerbaijan)

The first two of the Folk Songs are not actual folk songs. "Black Is the Colour (Of My True Love's Hair)" and "I Wonder as I Wander" were both written by the Kentucky folk singer and composer John Jacob Niles. There is a traditional tune for "Black is the Color ..." but, because his father thought it was "downright terrible", Niles recalled, "I wrote myself a new tune, ending it in a nice modal manner." Berio's suite opens with the viola instructed to play "like a wistful country dance fiddler", free of bar lines and rhythmically independent of the voice. "I Wonder as I Wander" was developed by Niles out of the mere three lines he was able to extract from a revivalist preacher's daughter, "a tousled, unwashed blond, and very lovely". Harmonics from the viola, cello and harp contribute toward the "hurdy-gurdy sound" Berio wanted to accompany this second song. The extended bird-song postlude for flute and clarinet in Berio's version seems to have been suggested by the passing reference to the "bird on the wing".

Armenia, the country of Berberian's ancestors, provided the third song, "Loosin yelav", which describes the rising of the moon. In the French song "Rossignolet du bois", accompanied only by the clarinet at first but later by the harp and crotales, a nightingale advises an inquiring lover to sing his serenades two hours after midnight, and identifies the "apples" in his garden as the moon and the sun. A sustained chord colored by the striking of automobile spring coils bridges this song to the next one, the old Sicilian song "A la femminisca", sung by fishermen's wives as they wait at the docks.

Like the first two songs, the sixth, "La Donna Ideale", and the seventh, "Ballo", come not from anonymous folk bards but from Berio himself (see background section above). The old Genoese dialect folk poem "The Ideal Woman" says that if you find a woman at once well-born, well-mannered, well-formed and with a good dowry, for God's sake don't let her get away. "The Ball", another old Italian poem, says that the wisest of men lose their heads over love, but love resists the sun and ice and all else.

"Motettu de tristura" comes from Sardinia and apostrophizes the nightingale: "How you resemble me as I weep for my lover... When they bury me, sing me this song."

The next two songs are also found in Joseph Canteloube's Chants d'Auvergne and are in the Occitan language. "Malurous qu'o uno fenno" poses the eternal marital paradox: he with no spouse seeks one, and he with one wishes he had none. A cello echoing the improvisation at the opening of the suite introduces "Lo Fïolairé", in which a girl at her spinning wheel sings of exchanging kisses with a shepherd.

Berberian discovered the last song, known in the suite as "Azerbaijan Love Song", on a 78 RPM record from the Azerbaijan Soviet Socialist Republic, sung in the Azerbaijani language except for one verse in Russian, which a Russian-speaking friend told her compared love to a stove. Berberian sang, purely by rote, the sounds she transcribed as best she could from that scratchy old record. She knew not one word of Azerbaijani. The music was transcribed for her by Louis Andriessen.

== Recordings ==
- 1971: Luciano Berio, Luciano Berio Conducts His "Epifanie" And "Folk Songs", BBC Symphony Orchestra, Juilliard Ensemble, Cathy Berberian, soprano (RCA Red Seal LSC 3189)
- 1990: Luciano Berio, Formazioni, Folk Songs & Sinfonia, Royal Concertgebouw Orchestra, Ricardo Chailly, mezzo-soprano: Jard van Nes, (Decca 4258322)
- 1996: Luciano Berio, Folk Songs per voce e orchestra, Luisa Castellani, voice, Orchestra da Camera Italiana, Alberto Veronesi, conductor (CD OCG 004)
- 1997: Luciano Berio, Folk Songs per voce, flauto, clarinetto, 2 percussioni, arpa, viola, violoncello, Luisa Castellani, voice, Mauro Ceccanti, conductor (CD Arts Music GMBH 47376-2)
- 2023: Luciano Berio, Folk Songs, Magdalena Kožená, mezzo-soprano, Simon Rattle, conductor Czech Philharmonic (Pentatone)

== See also ==
- Ayre (Golijov), 2005
