= Chants d'Auvergne, Vol. 2 =

- CBS Masterworks CD: MK 37837

Studio album by Frederica von Stade
- Released: 1986
- Studio: Abbey Road Studios, London
- Genre: Classical vocal
- Length: 60:34
- Language: French and Occitan
- Label: CBS Masterworks
- Producer: David Mottley

Frederica von Stade: Chants d'Auvergne, Vol. 2 & Triptyque is a 60-minute studio album containing thirteen of the thirty traditional Auvergnat songs collected and arranged by Joseph Canteloube, together with a song cycle of his own composition, performed by von Stade and the Royal Philharmonic Orchestra under the direction of Antonio de Almeida. It was released in 1986. The same artists recorded Canteloube's seventeen other Auvergnat songs for the album's predecessor, Frederica von Stade: Chants d'Auvergne, Vol. 1, released in 1982.

== Recording ==
The album was recorded digitally on 21–24 July 1985 in Studio No. 1 at EMI's Abbey Road Studios, London. The engineers used Neumann microphones and a Sony PCM 1610 system. The album was mastered at the CBS Recording Studios in New York City with CBS's DisComputer system.

== Packaging ==
The cover of the album was designed by Alan Davis, and features a photograph of von Stade taken by John Gotman.

== Critical reception ==
=== Reviews ===
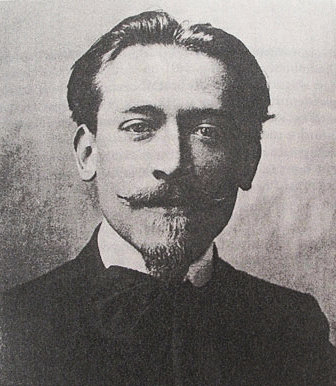
Joseph Canteloube

Robert Ackart reviewed the album on LP in Stereo Review in June 1986. Canteloube's orchestrations of his Chants d'Auvergne were, he thought, open to criticism. The composer's arrangements hinted at the sound-world of ancient instruments, but some of them were so elaborate that they seemed alien to the folk-tunes that they enveloped. There was no denying, though, that they were gorgeous, and there was much to enjoy in their rhythmic complexity. The way in which Frederica von Stade performed them on her new disc could be praised without reservation. She was especially good at expressing the sadness of the less sunny songs. "Her limpid, golden voice, admirably handled, draws from each selection its full share of musical beauty and poetic meaning." And she sang the Canteloube cycle at the beginning of her album - a setting of verses celebrating summer, moonlight and dawn - with "an utterly seductive tonal and stylistic voluptuousness". Conducting, Antonio de Almeida was sensitive, and seemed more deeply engaged with his music than he did on some of his other LPs. In sum, the album was an "excellent" recording of a "glorious" performance that was "a joy to listen to".

Hilary Finch reviewed the album on LP in Gramophone in July 1986. Frederica von Stade, she thought, was one of the few singers who sounded at home in Canteloube's arrangements of the folk-songs of the part of France from which he came. Her first selection of the Chants d'Auvergne had demonstrated "the singer, like the song, to be a perfect fusion of childlike storyteller and sophisticated vocal orchestrator", and her new album did likewise. One song was very reminiscent of the earlier album's "Baïlèro". "Pastourelle" was another example of "hilltop to hilltop vocalise". "Lou boussu" painted a picture of a hunchback with a "nice balance of melancholy and wry humour" that was reminiscent of Erik Satie. "Obal, din lo coumbèlo" was a wistful miniature fable about a hare, a shepherd and the three daughters of a Prince. "Jou l'pount d'o Mirabel" - "At the Mirabel bridge" - exemplified the subtlety both of Canteloube's craftsmanship and of von Stade's response to it: she used her voice like an artist touching in "fleeting brushstrokes of suggestion as [a] washer-girl and [a] horseman are brought into view ... behind a heat haze of rising and falling piano chromatics". What most made the album worthy of a place on collectors' shelves was not, however, its Auvergnat songs at all but rather a work of Canteloube's own invention. Von Stade was the first singer to have recorded Triptyque for more than twenty years. The 1914 song cycle put one in mind of both Jean-Jacques Rousseau and Ernest Chausson. "The pantheistic ecstasy of Roger Frêne's poetry is realized in steamy, late-romantic settings, with the voice joining in the nocturnal orchestration of the central moonlit panel, and ending in long, clear arcs of hymning melody to Pan". The album left one feeling regretful that much of Canteloube's music still lay unheard in libraries' dustiest recesses.

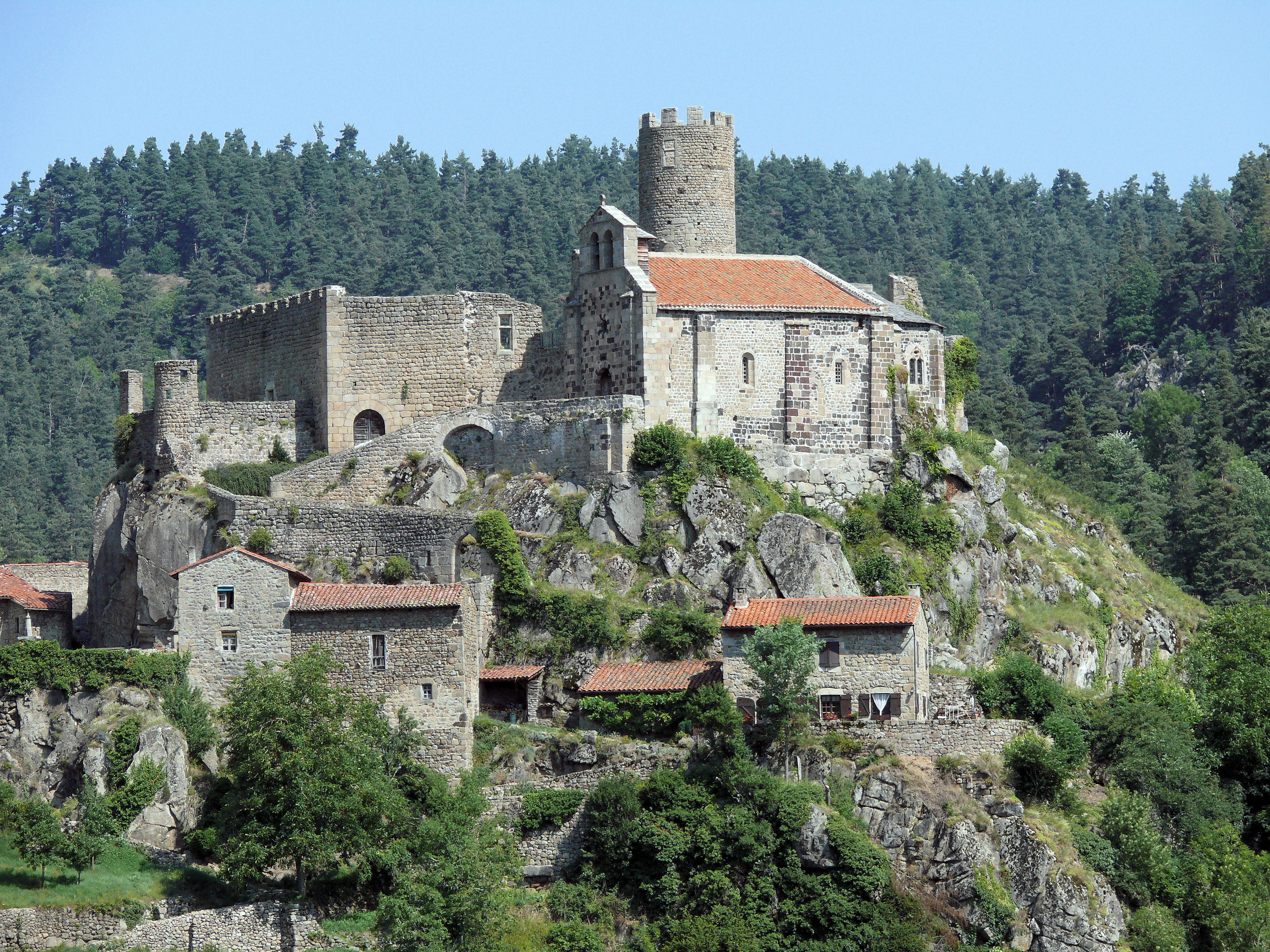
The Château de Chalencon in the Auvergne's St André de Chalencon

In the October 1997 issue of Gramophone, Richard T. Fairman used a compilation CD of most of Frederica von Stade's Auvergnat songs as a reference disc when reviewing a new CD of the Chants d'Auvergne performed by Dawn Upshaw, the Orchestre de l'Opéra de Lyon and Kent Nagano. The von Stade anthology was one that he had long been fond of. It presented her performances of the most familiar of Canteloube's songs in renditions that were free of eccentricity. "Von Stade varies her tone according to the sense of each song," he wrote, "but the overall mood is less sharp, more comfortable if you like, than with Upshaw." Moreover, von Stade's Royal Philharmonic provided a more sumptuous backdrop than Upshaw's Lyon orchestra. Collectors tempted by Upshaw's album would "probably find that the consoling romanticism of [von Stade's] tried-and-trusted disc [was] more what they had in mind."

Writing in Opera News in December 2016, David Shengold mentioned the album in the course of reviewing a box set of Frederica von Stade's recordings in which it was included: "[Von Stade's] two luminous discs of orchestrated Canteloube songs ... would be on anyone's list of essential traversals."

Frederica von Stade's approach to the Chants d'Auvergne was also critiqued in the 1988 edition of The new Penguin guide to compact discs and cassettes, which judged that "Fine as Frederica von Stade's singing is, she is stylistically and temperamentally far less at home in Canteloube's lovely folksong settings than Victoria de los Angeles, Kiri Te Kanawa or Jill Gomez".

=== Accolade ===
The album was nominated for a Grammy award for the best classical vocal solo performance of 1986.

== CD track listing ==
Joseph Canteloube (1879-1957), composer

Triptyque (1914, texts by Roger Frêne)

- 1 (6:00) "Offrande à l'été"
- 2 (4:53) "Lunaire"
- 3 (8:21) "Hymne dans l'aurore"

Joseph Canteloube, collector and arranger

Chants d'Auvergne (1923-1930)

- 4 (4:36) "Là-haut, sur le rocher" (Vol. 5, No. 3)
- 5 (4:29) "Jou l'pount d'o Mirabel" (Vol. 4, No. 1)
- 6 (1:50) "Hé! beyla-z-y dau fé!" (Vol. 5, No. 4)
- 7 (2:55) "Lou boussu" (Vol. 3, No. 3)
- 8 (3:40) "Pastourelle" (Vol. 2, No. 1)
- 9 (1:36) "Malurous qu'o uno fenno" (Vol. 3, No. 5)
- 10 (7:02) "Obal, din lo coumbèlo" (Vol. 5, No. 1)
- 11 (2:12) "La pastrouletta è lou chibalie" (Vol. 2, No. 3)
- 12 (3:03) "Quand z'eyro petitoune" (Vol. 5, No. 2)
- 13 (1:37) "Postouro, sé tu m'aymo" (Vol. 5, No. 5)
- 14 (3:50) "Pastorale" (Vol. 4, No. 5)
- 15 (2:48) "La pastoura als camps" (Vol. l, No. 1)
- 16 (1:19) "Lou diziou bé" (Vol. 5, No. 8)

== Personnel ==
=== Musical ===
- Frederica von Stade, mezzo-soprano
- Royal Philharmonic Orchestra
- Antonio de Almeida (1928-1997), conductor

=== Other ===
- David Mottley, producer
- Peter Brown, engineer

== Release history ==
On 3 February 1986, the album was released on LP (catalogue number IM 37837), with notes by Barrymore Laurence Scherer and an insert with texts and translations. The album was also released on cassette (catalogue number IMT 37837).

Also in 1986, the album was issued on CD (catalogue number MK 37837), with a 32-page booklet including Scherer's notes and texts and translations. In 1997, Sony issued a compilation CD (catalogue number SBK 63063) that included a selection of songs from the album and its prequel. In 2014, Newton Classics issued the album coupled with its prequel in their 2-CD collection Chants d'Auvergne. In 2016, Sony reissued the album on CD (in a miniature replica of the sleeve of the original LP) with a 52-page booklet in their 18-CD collection Frederica von Stade: The Complete Columbia Recital Albums (catalogue number 88875183412).
