= Soundcheck =

Preparation that takes place before a performance

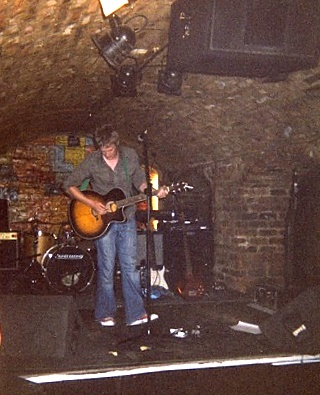
Dublin musician Rob Smith doing a soundcheck in the Cavern Club, Liverpool in 2006

A soundcheck is the preparation that takes place before a concert, speech, or similar performance to adjust the sound on the venue's sound reinforcement or public address system. The performer and the audio engineers run through a small portion of the upcoming show to ensure the venue's front of house and stage monitor systems are producing clear sound, are set at the proper volume, and have the correct mix and equalization (the latter step using the mixing console). When applied to microphones exclusively, it is more commonly (and appropriately) called a mic check.

Sound checks are especially important for rock music shows and other performances that rely heavily on sound reinforcement systems.

== Processes ==
Soundcheck, Kolosseum Lübeck, 9 March 2018

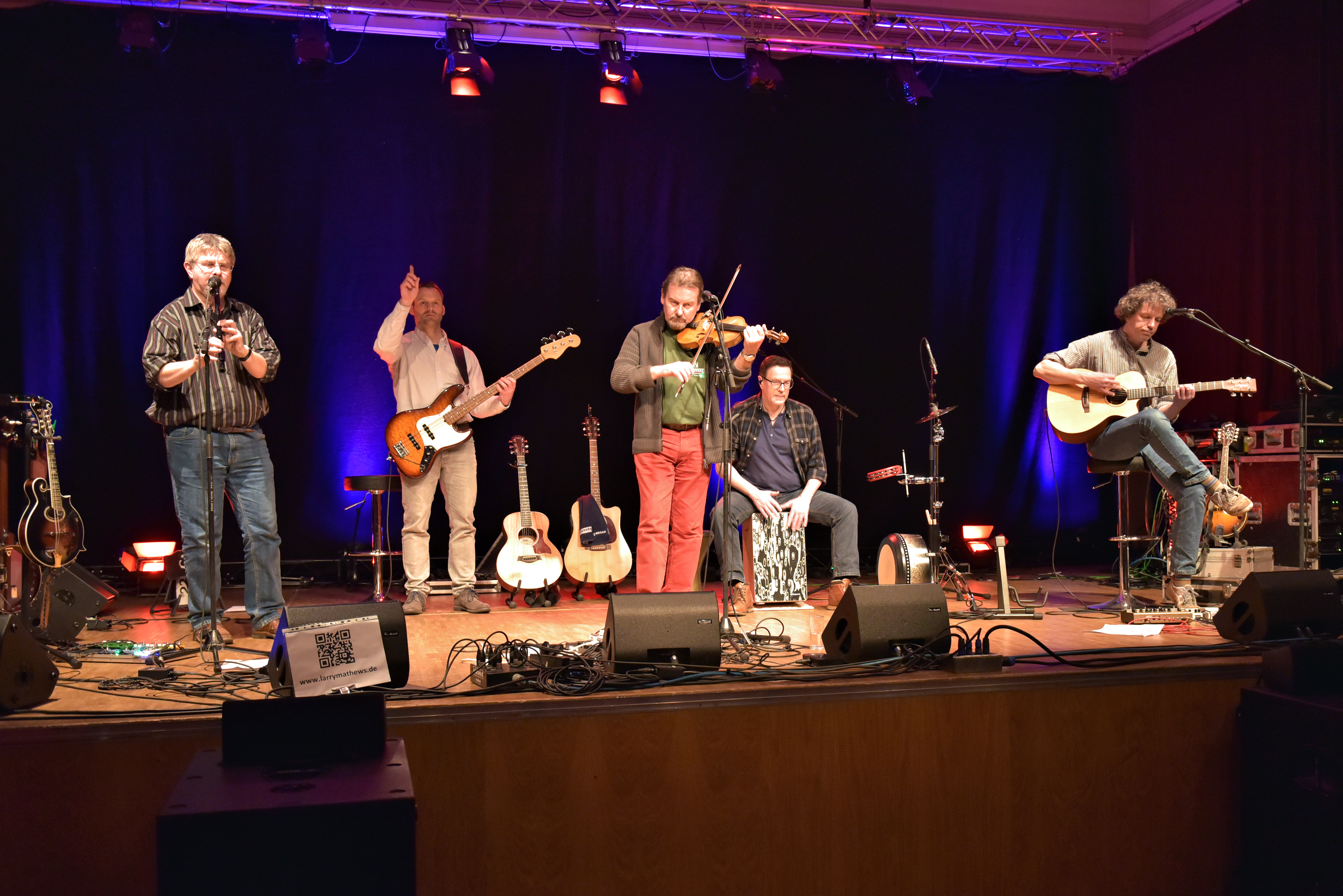
Larry Mathews Blackstone Band on stage. Hand sign: monitor volume up

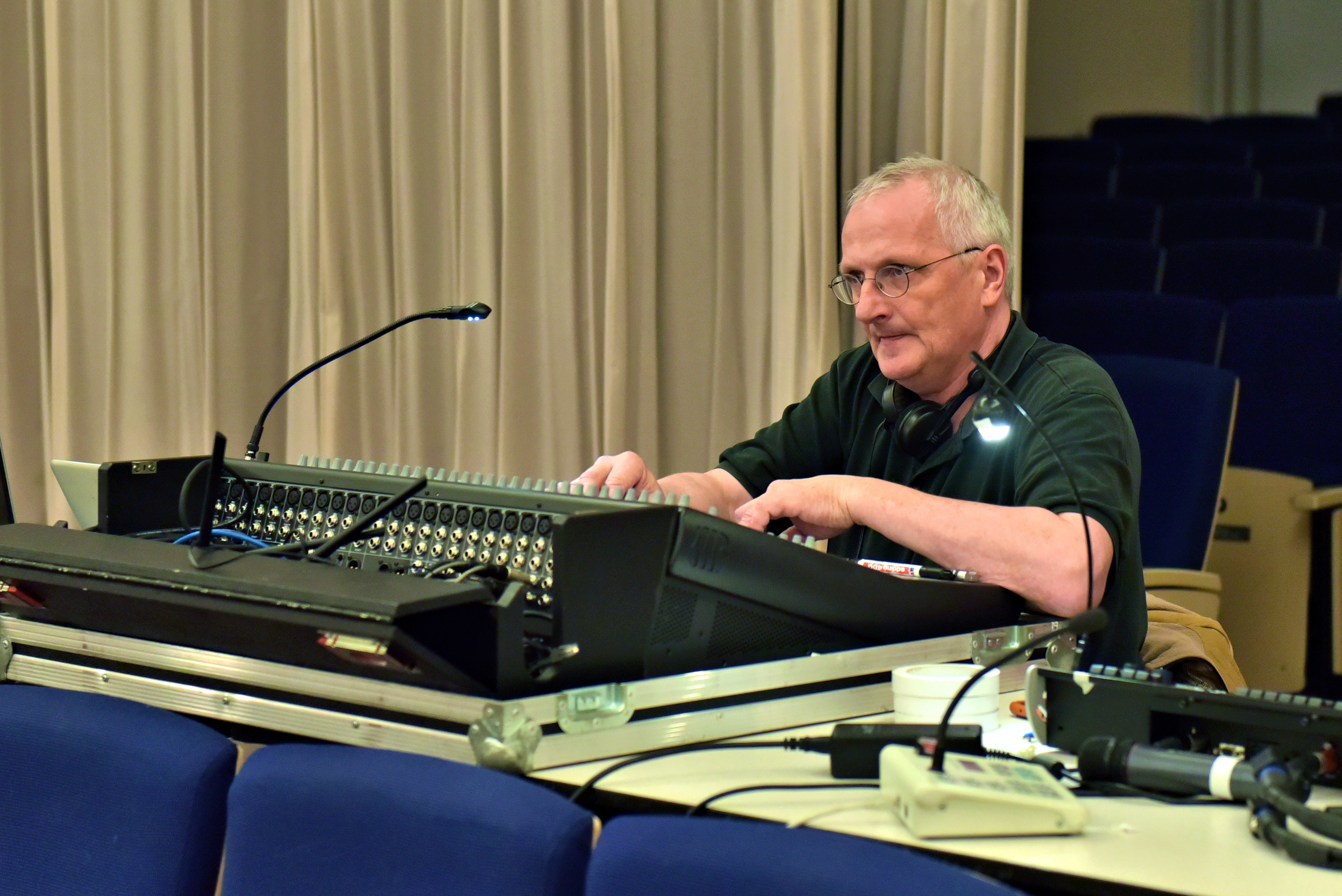
Audio engineer at front of house position

A line check is normally carried out before the soundcheck itself. Once the sound system is set up, the front of house engineer works through the input channels in order, tapping each microphone in turn to confirm that it reaches the console on the expected channel and that direct boxes and any inserted processing such as gates and compressors are working. A line check is not a soundcheck; its purpose is to find inputs that are faulty or mis-patched before the performers begin theirs.

Soundchecks are usually conducted prior to audience entry to the venue. The soundcheck may start with the rhythm section, and then go on to the melody section and vocalists. After technical adjustments have been completed by the sound crew, the performers leave the stage and the audience is admitted. Since the acoustics of a venue often change somewhat once it is filled with audience members, the sound engineer often has to make minor modifications to the sound system settings and levels once the audience is there.

If there is more than one artist performing, soundchecks can be more complicated.
