= Élie Cohen (conductor) =

Élie Cohen, born in Marseille in 1886, was a conductor, principally active in the field of opera in France during the inter-war years, and made many recordings.

== Career ==
Cohen made his debut at the Opéra-Comique on 7 August 1922 with Lakmé and continued to conduct there up to 1940. He also conducted premieres and new productions of A Quoi Rêvent les Jeunes Filles (Fraggi), Swan Lake, Printemps Fleuri (ballet, music Tchaikovsky), Reflets (ballet, music Schmitt), Le Chemineau, Gianni Schicchi, Masques et Bergamasques (Leroux), and La Peau de chagrin (Levadé).

Cohen conducted the Opéra de Nice from at least the 1936/1937 season, an example of which was an all-Ravel opera and ballet evening in 1937. His appointment there was warmly welcomed by both public and critics. Outside France, he conducted Lakmé in Geneva in 1934, with Vina Bovy in the title role. He was listed as an assistant conductor of the Orchestre Radio-symphonique-lyrique which, along with many other musicians, was evacuated to Rennes in September 1939, just after the opening of hostilities in World War II.

Cohen was a regular conductor of French opera for Columbia in the 1920s and 30s. Notable among Cohen's recordings are complete versions of Carmen (1928, missing the dialogue and act 1 finale; the Flower Song is conducted by Gaubert), Manon (1932), and Werther (1931), where his achievement of "unforced, eloquently expressive, forwardly-placed French word-singing" has been much praised. He also directed the accompaniment to recorded operatic excerpts sung by French singers of the period, as well as some Songs of the Auvergne, with Madeleine Grey.
