= Chants d'Auvergne =

French folksong collection

Chants d'Auvergne (French pronunciation: [ʃɑ̃ dovɛːʁɲ]; English: Songs from the Auvergne), by Joseph Canteloube, is a collection of folk songs from the Auvergne region of France, arranged for soprano voice and orchestra or piano between 1923 and 1930. The 27 songs, collected in five series, are in the local language, Auvergnat, a dialect of Occitan. The best-known of the songs is the "Baïlèro", which has been frequently recorded and performed, sometimes with slight variations of Canteloube's arrangement, such as for choir or instrumental performance, rather than the original soprano solo.

The first recording, of eleven of the songs, was by Madeleine Grey in 1930, with an ensemble conducted by Élie Cohen. The songs are part of the standard repertoire and have been recorded by many singers.

The melodic elements of two of these songs, "Baïlèro" and "Obal, din lou limouzi (La-bas dans le limousin)", were incorporated into William Walton's soundtrack for Laurence Olivier's 1944 film of Shakespeare's Henry V. "Baïlèro" (sometimes known as "Le Baylere" or "The Shepherd's Song") has also been re-arranged for full chorus by Goff Richards for the National Youth Choir of Great Britain. It was recorded by Tony Osborne Sound for use in a Dubonnet advertisement in 1972.

== The five series ==
=== 1st Series ===
- "La pastoura als camps (La bergère aux champs)"
- "Baïlèro (Chant de bergers de Haute-Auvergne)"
- "Trois bourrées"
  - "L'aïo dé rotso (L'eau de source)"
  - "Ound'onoren gorda ? (Où irons-nous garder?)"
  - "Obal, din lou limouzi (La-bas dans le limousin)"

=== 2nd Series ===
- "Pastourelle"
- "L'Antouèno (L'Antoine)"
- "La pastrouletta e lou chibalié (La bergère et le cavalier)"
- "La delaïssádo (La delaissée)"
- "Deux bourrées"
  - "N'ai pas ieu de mio (Je n'ai pas d'amie)"
  - "Lo calhe (La caille)"

=== 3rd Series ===
- "Lo fiolairé (La fileuse)"
- "Passo pel prat (Viens par le pré)"
- "Lou boussu (Le bossu)"
- "Brezairola (Berceuse)"
- "Malurous qu'o uno fenno (Malheureux qui a une femme)"

=== 4th Series ===
- "Jou l'pount d'o Mirabel (Au pont de Mirabel)"
- "Oï ayaï"
- "Per l'Efan (Pour l'enfant)"
- "Chut, chut"
- "Pastorale"
- "Lou coucut (Le coucou)"

=== 5th Series ===
- "Obal, din lo coumbèlo (Au loin, la-bas dans la vallée)"
- "Quan z'eyro petitoune (Lorsque j'étais petite)"
- "Là-haut, sur le rocher"
- "Hé! beyla-z-y dau fé! (Hé! donne-lui du foin!)"
- "Postouro, sé tu m'aymo (Bergère si tu m'aimes)"
- "Tè, l'co tè (Va, l'chien, va!)"
- "Uno jionto postouro (Une jolie bergère)"
- "Lou diziou bé (On dirait bien)"

== Discography ==
Complete recordings

- Netania Davrath, with an anonymous orchestra conducted by Pierre de la Roche
- Véronique Gens, with the Orchestre National de Lille conducted by Jean-Claude Casadesus and Serge Baudo (including Triptyque and Chants de France)
- Carolyn Sampson, with the Tapiola Sinfonietta conducted by Pascal Rophé
- Frederica von Stade, with the Royal Philharmonic Orchestra conducted by Antonio de Almeida (including Triptyque)
- Kiri Te Kanawa, with the English Chamber Orchestra conducted by Jeffrey Tate
- Dawn Upshaw, with the Orchestre National de Lyon conducted by Kent Nagano

Substantial excerpts

- Victoria de los Angeles, with the Orchestre des Concerts Lamoureux conducted by Jean-Pierre Jacquillat
- Arleen Auger, with the English Chamber Orchestra conducted by Yan Pascal Tortelier
- María Bayo, with the Orquesta Sinfónica de Tenerife conducted by Victor Pablo Perez
- Karina Gauvin, with the Canadian Chamber Ensemble conducted by Raffi Armenian
- Jill Gomez, with the Royal Liverpool Philharmonic Orchestra conducted by Vernon Handley
- Madeleine Grey, 1930
- Sara Macliver, with the Queensland Symphony Orchestra conducted by Brett Kelly
- Marvis Martin, with the Orchestre d'Auvergne conducted by Jean-Jacques Kantorow (chamber version)
- Anna Moffo, with the American Symphony Orchestra conducted by Leopold Stokowski
- Patricia Rozario, with the Philharmonia Orchestra conducted by John Pritchard
- Nicole Theven, with the Orchestre National de la RTF conducted by Désiré-Émile Inghelbrecht
- Lucie de Vienne Blanc, with a cor anglais and oboe accompaniment

Brief excerpts

- Renée Fleming: Renée Fleming: The Beautiful Voice, with the English Chamber Orchestra conducted by Jeffrey Tate ("Baïlèro")
- Renée Fleming: Guilty Pleasures, with the Philharmonia Orchestra conducted by Sebastian Lang-Lessing ("La delaïssàdo" and "Malurous qu'o uno fenno")
- Yvonne Kenny: Simple Gifts, with the Melbourne Symphony Orchestra conducted by Vladimir Kaminski ("Baïlèro")
- Magdalena Kožená: Waldbühne: Goodbye Sir Simon!, with the Berliner Philharmoniker conducted by Simon Rattle (DVD)
- Ana Maria Martinez: Soprano songs and arias, with the Prague Philharmonia conducted by Steven Mercurio ("Baïlèro")
- Karita Mattila: Villa Lobos: Bachianas Brasilieras and other works, with the Academy of St Martin in the Fields conducted by Sir Neville Marriner ("Baïlèro")
- Kate Royal: Recital, with the Academy of St Martin in the Fields conducted by Edward Gardner ("Baïlèro", "La delaïssàdo" and "Malurous qu'o uno fenno")
- Frederica von Stade: A Song of Thanksgiving, with the Utah Symphony Orchestra conducted by Joseph Silverstein ("Baïlèro")
- Frederica von Stade: Frederica von Stade Live!, with Martin Katz (piano) ("Brezairola" and "L'aïo dè rotso")

Recordings by crossover artists

- Sarah Brightman: Classics ("Baïlèro")
- Barbara Courtney-King: Pastourelle ("Pastourelle" with a different text)
- Elysium (soprano quartet): Auvergne Chants, with the Vienna Radio Symphony Orchestra
- Lesley Garrett: Diva! A Soprano at the Movies, with the Philharmonia Orchestra conducted by Andrew Greenwood ("Baïlèro")
- Lesley Garrett: Prima Donna, with the Philharmonia Orchestra conducted by Ivor Bolton ("La delaïssàdo" and "Malurous qu'o uno fenno")
- Lesley Garrett: Simple Gifts, with the Royal Philharmonic Orchestra conducted by Peter Robinson ("Pastourelle" and "L'aïo dè rotso")
- Katherine Jenkins: Premiere, with the Arcadian Ensemble conducted by James Morgan ("Baïlèro")
- Eddi Reader: Peacetime ("Baïlèro" with a different text)
- Susan Reed: Songs of the Auvergne ("Passo del prat", "La fïolairé", "Pastourelle", "Malurous qu'o uno fenno", "Brezairola", "Baïlèro" and "Trois Bourrées" in a chamber version)
- Barbra Streisand: Classical Barbra ("Brezairola")

== See also ==
- Chants d'Auvergne, Vol. 1, with Frederica von Stade (Antonio de Almeida recording)
- Chants d'Auvergne, Vol. 2 & Triptyque, with Frederica von Stade (Antonio de Almeida recording)
