= Cara Dillon (album) =

Studio album by Cara Dillon
- Released: 16 July 2001 (UK); 5 February 2002 (worldwide)
- Recorded: 2000–2001
- Genre: Folk, rock, pop, Celtic
- Length: 45:38
- Label: Rough Trade
- Producer: Sam Lakeman

Cara Dillon chronology
Cara Dillon (2001)	Sweet Liberty (2003)

Professional ratings
Review scores
Source	Rating
AllMusic	4/5 stars
Q	9/10
Hot Press	9/12 stars

Cara Dillon is the debut solo album from the Irish folk artist Cara Dillon. It was recorded at The Firs, producer/partner Sam Lakeman's parents' house. There were also recordings made in County Donegal, Ireland. The album was mixed by John Reynolds (Sinéad O'Connor, Damien Dempsey). It contained nine traditional songs Dillon had known since her schooldays and also had two original songs, "Blue Mountain River" (which was released to radio in Ireland) and "I Wish I Was".

The album was released to critical acclaim, earning Dillon four BBC Radio 2 Folk Awards nominations, two of which she won, a Hot Press Irish Music Award and charting in the top 10 of several music critics polls, including HMV Choice Reader's Poll. The opening track of the album, "Black Is the Colour", won Best Traditional Track at the BBC Folk Awards in 2002, and resurfaced in 2006 in the form of a trance remix single by Derry-based DJs 2Devine. Throughout 2001 and 2002, Dillon toured the album in the UK, Ireland and Europe, and several dates with WOMAD took her to New Zealand and Australia.

== Track listing ==
All songs traditional/arranged by Dillon/Lakeman, except: 7 & 8 (written by Dillon/Lakeman)

1. "Black Is the Colour" – 4:04
2. "Donald of Glencoe" – 5:32
3. "Craigie Hill" – 4:45
4. "Green Grows the Laurel" – 4:30
5. "The Lark in the Clear Air" – 2:24
6. "The Lonesome Scenes of Winter" – 4:48
7. "Blue Mountain River" – 3:46
8. "I Wish I Was" – 3:14
9. "The Maid of Culmore" – 3:09
10. "She's Like the Swallow" – 3:20
11. "I Am a Youth That's Inclined to Ramble" – 6:07
