= Offenbach Arias and Overtures =

- RCA Victor Red Seal CD, 09026681162

Studio album by Frederica von Stade
- Released: 1995
- Studio: City Halls, Glasgow
- Genre: Operetta
- Length: 65:04
- Language: French
- Label: RCA Victor Red Seal
- Producer: James Mallinson

Offenbach Arias and Overtures is a 65-minute studio album of excerpts from operettas by Jacques Offenbach performed by the American mezzo-soprano Frederica von Stade and the Scottish Chamber Orchestra under the direction of Antonio de Almeida. It was released in 1995.

== Recording ==
The album was digitally recorded on 16–18 December 1994 in the City Halls, Glasgow.

== Critical reception ==
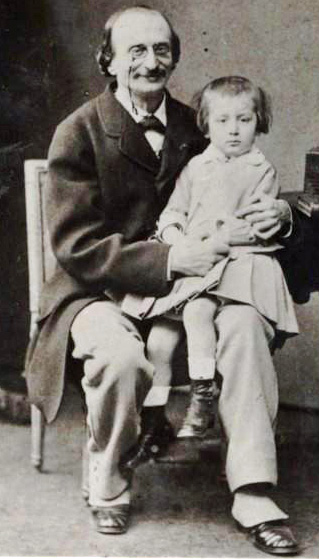
Jacques Offenbach and his only son, Auguste, in 1865

The operetta critic Andrew Lamb reviewed the album in Gramophone in February 1996. Antonio de Almeida's anthology, he wrote, covered "a good cross-section of familiar and unfamiliar Offenbach". As well as music from the often staged La belle Hélène, La grande duchesse de Gérolstein and La Périchole, the album included excerpts from scores on the dustier shelves of opera houses' libraries. From La fille du tambour-major, for example, there was a martial number for the eponymous Drum-Major's daughter. From Pomme d'api, there were two mischievous songs for the maid-cum-mistress. And from Madame l'archiduc, there was the very obscure tour de force in which "the mystified heroine attempts to disentangle the letters 'S. A. D. E.' whispered to her by conspirators, and ends up reciting the entire alphabet". The album's soloist, Frederica von Stade, "[moved] with grace and majesty through these numbers written for a range of Offenbach's leading ladies", but she was more successful in some items than in others. She was outstandingly good in the "succulent" waltz-rondeau from La vie parisienne, and in the very well known "Amours divins!" from La belle Hélène. In "Ah! Que les hommes sont bêtes!" from La Périchole, however, she "[failed] to capture all the bite of the Meilhac and Halévy text ... in the way of predecessors such as Suzanne Lafaye". The album's purely instrumental items were also performed well without quite attaining to perfection. It was good to have an opportunity to hear the overture to "La romance de la rose", which "begins with 'The last rose of summer' and develops into a lively allegretto". And the overtures to Barbe-bleue and La grande duchesse de Gérolstein "[bubbled] along engagingly in their authentic original Parisian form". But de Almeida had shown that he could elicit even more "sparkle and excitement" from Offenbach's jeux d'esprit in an earlier anthology that he had recorded with Philips in 1988. All in all, though, his new collection was a disc of "considerable charm".

BBC Music Magazine reviewed the album in 1998. "Von Stade has a special feeling for French music," their critic wrote, "especially operetta, to which her light and graceful mezzo brings just the right touch of chic."

David Shengold reviewed the album in Opera News in 2016. "The all-Offenbach collection", he wrote, "...featuring de Almeida in strong, stylish support, shows anew von Stade's mastery of Gallic texts, here in an ever-shifting emotional range. All-Offenbach programmes can trap lesser artists: this collection is recommendable as an introduction to the composer."

== CD track listing ==
Jacques Offenbach (1819-1880)

Arias and Overtures

La Périchole (Paris, 1868; libretto by Henri Meilhac and Ludovic Halévy)

- 1 (2:39) Ouverture
- 2 (3:18) La lettre de la Périchole: "Oh! mon cher aimant, je te jure"
- 3 (2:55) "Que veulent dires ces colères...Ah! que les hommes sont bêtes!"
- 4 (2:06) Griserie-ariette: "Ah! quel dîner je viens de faire"
- 5 (3:07) Entracte

La fille du tambour-major (Paris, 1879; libretto by Alfred Duru and Henri Chivot)

- 6 (2:41) Chanson de la fille du tambour-major: "Que m'importe un titre éclatant"

La belle Hélène (Paris, 1864; libretto by Henri Meilhac and Ludovic Halévy)

- 7 (4:13) "Amours divins! Ardentes flammes!"

Pomme d'api (Paris, 1873; libretto by Ludovic Halévy and William Busnach)

- 8 (5:31) Ouverture
- 9 (2:57) "Bonjour, monsieur, je suis la bonne"
- 10 (2:25) "J'en prendrai un, deux, trois"

Madame l'archiduc (Paris, 1874; libretto by Albert Millaud)

- 11 (3:57) Couplets de l'alphabet: "S. A. D. E."

La romance de la rose (Paris, 1869; libretto by Étienne Tréfeu, Jules Prével and Charles-Louis-Étienne Nuitter)

- 12 (2:09) Ouverture

La vie parisienne (Paris, 1866; libretto by Henri Meilhac and Ludovic Halévy)

- 13 (3:57) Rondeau et valse: "C'est ici l'endroit redouté"

Orphée aux enfers (Paris, 1858; libretto by Hector Crémieux)

- 14 (2:38) Couplets du berger joli: "La femme dont le cœur rêve"

Barbe-bleu (Paris, 1866; libretto by Henri Meilhac and Ludovic Halévy)

- 15 (3:24) Ouverture
- 16 (2:49) Couplets de Boulette: "Y'a des bergers dans le village"
- 17 (2:39) Couplets de la rosière: "Y penses-tu?...V'la z'encor de drôl's"

La grande-duchesse de Gérolstein (Paris, 1867; libretto by Henri Meilhac and Ludovic Halévy)

- 18 (4:05) Ouverture
- 19 (2:50) "Dites-lui qu'on l'a remarqué"
- 20 (3:57) "Vous aimez le danger...Ah! que j'aime les militaires"

== Personnel ==
=== Musical ===
- Frederica von Stade, mezzo-soprano
- Scottish Chamber Orchestra
- Antonio de Almeida, conductor

=== Other ===
- James Mallinson, producer
- Mike Hatch, engineer

== Release history ==
On 10 October 1995, RCA Victor Red Seal released the album on CD (catalogue number 09026681162) with a 32-page booklet that had no texts or translations but instead provided detailed notes by Richard Traubner. In 2016, the album was reissued on CD with a 52-page booklet in an 18-CD collection Frederica von Stade: The Complete Columbia Recital Albums (catalogue number 88875183412).
