= Antonio de Almeida (conductor) =

French conductor (1928–1997)

Antonio de Almeida (20 January 1928 – 18 February 1997) was a French conductor and musicologist.

Born Antonio Jacques de Almeida Santos in Neuilly-sur-Seine near Paris, his father was the financier Baron de Almeida Santos of Lisbon, his mother was the former Barbara Tapper of Highland Park near Chicago. His godfather was pianist Arthur Rubinstein.

== Early years ==
De Almeida was born in Neuilly-sur-Seine. As a child he studied piano, showing great musical talent (although he admitted he was not an exceptional pianist). In the early 1940s, he taught himself to play the clarinet by listening to recordings of Benny Goodman and Artie Shaw. When his family moved to Buenos Aires he studied with Alberto Ginastera, and he had the opportunity to hear performances conducted by notable European refugees at the Teatro Colón. He studied nuclear chemistry at the Massachusetts Institute of Technology. Leading a student orchestra there, he realized he was more interested in music than in science. His godfather, pianist Artur Rubinstein, convinced him to give up his full scholarship at M.I.T. He attended Yale University, where he studied musical theory with Paul Hindemith. He received his Bachelor of Music degree at Yale in 1949. He took conducting courses with Sergei Koussevitzky and Leonard Bernstein at the Tanglewood Music Center, and also studied conducting with George Szell. During his student days, he played first horn at Tufts College, first bassoon at Harvard, oboe with the Wellesley Orchestra, clarinet at MIT and the cello at Yale.

== Conducting ==
De Almeida began conducting for Portuguese Radio in Lisbon in 1949, and soon after was appointed to his first conducting post at the Oporto Symphony Orchestra. While there, he invited Sir Thomas Beecham to guest conduct the orchestra. He was the conductor of the Portuguese Radio in Lisbon (1957–1960) and Stuttgart Philharmonic (1962–1964). He gave the Paris premiere of Il Trittico at the Opéra-Comique in 1964, and worked at the Opéra National de Paris from 1965 to 1967. He was principal guest conductor of the Houston Symphony (1969–1971) and then music director of the Orchestre philharmonique de Nice (1976–1978). He gave the Argentinian premiere of Mahler's 7th Symphony in Buenos Aires. He became the music director of the Moscow Symphony Orchestra in 1993, a position he held at his death.

In 1960, De Almeida made his American debut with the opening of the eighth subscription season of New York's American Opera Society at The Town Hall. He led the Symphony of the Air in a concert version of Christoph Willibald Gluck's Orfeo ed Euridice. New York Times reviewer Harold C. Schonberg wrote of the conductor "He knows his business. Cool, not flamboyant of gesture, capable, he held the performance together as nicely as one would desire". He also wrote that "Mr. de Almeida is a conductor to watch". In the UK he conducted Idomeneo with the English Bach Festival in 1990.

== Recording ==
He made numerous recordings, specializing in French operas such as Ambroise Thomas' Mignon and Hamlet, and Fromental Halévy's La Juive. His recordings were instrumental in restoring compositions of Ernest Chausson, Henri Duparc, Florent Schmitt and Jules Massenet to the active repertory. He recorded ballet music from the operas of Gaetano Donizetti, Gioachino Rossini, and Giuseppe Verdi. With the Moscow Symphony he recorded orchestral works of, among others, Charles Tournemire, Henri Sauguet, and Gian Francesco Malipiero. He recorded for many labels, including Philips, RCA, Columbia, EMI, Erato, Naxos, and Supraphon.

== Musicology ==
An interest in the works of Jacques Offenbach began in the 1950s, and by the 1970s Almeida was known as an authority. He made numerous discoveries including previously unknown arias and a second-act finale for La Grande-Duchesse de Gérolstein. He prepared editions of Offenbach's operas, and compiled a Thematic Catalogue of the Works of Jacques Offenbach and was general editor of an Offenbach publication project for Belwin Mills. He also edited works by Monsigny, Grétry and Delibes.

He became co-artistic director (with H.C. Robbins Landon) of the Haydn Foundation in 1968. Under the Foundation's auspices, he recorded a set of Joseph Haydn's symphonies. He also edited a complete set of Luigi Boccherini's symphonies for Doblinger in Vienna.

== Personal life ==
He was married to Lynn Erdman in 1953, their marriage ending in divorce in 1988. The couple had two sons (Antonio de Almeida Santos and Lawrence d'Almeida) and a daughter (Cecilia de Almeida Frachesen). His son Antonio, a Juilliard and Academy of Vocal Arts trained opera singer, worked as classical record producer and served as a producer and engineer for some of the conductor's Moscow Symphony recordings.

Despite his Portuguese/American parentage, he declared his nationality to be French, and he remained a citizen of France throughout his life. He spoke six languages fluently, and was well versed in Greek and Latin.

He died of liver and lung cancer on 18 February 1997, age 69, at the University of Pittsburgh Medical Center.

== Selected discography ==
- Bizet : Le docteur Miracle, with Liliane Berton, Lina Dachary, Jean-Christophe Benoît, Rémy Corazza, Orchestre Lyrique de l'O.R.T.F, Barclay Inédits 1973
- Sauguet : Symphonies 1-4, Moscow Symphony Orchestra, Marco Polo
- Canteloube's Songs of the Auvergne, with Frederica von Stade and the Royal Philharmonic Orchestra, one volume in 1982 and a second in 1986, CBS Masterworks
- Haydn - Symphonies 93 - 98, Orchestra of the Haydn Foundation, Rome; Symphonies 62 - 80, The Paris Haydn Foundation Orchestra, Philips 1975
- Dukas - L'apprenti Sorcier, La Péri, Polyeucte, Czech Philharmonic Orchestra, Supraphon, 1975
- Overtures and arias from stage works by Offenbach with the Scottish Chamber Orchestra and Frederica von Stade, RCA Victor Red Seal, 1995
- Orchestral music from operas by Offenbach (Le voyage dans la lune, Die Rheinnixen, Mr. et Mme. Denis, Orphée aux Enfers, Le roi Carotte and Maître Péronilla), Philharmonia Orchestra, Philips 1987
- Halévy - La Juive, with Richard Tucker, Martina Arroyo, Anna Moffo, Juan Sabate and Bonaldo Giaiotti, Ambrosian Opera Chorus & New Philharmonia Orchestra, RCA Red Seal, 1974
- Massenet - La Navarraise, with Lucia Popp, Alain Vanzo, Gérard Souzay, Michel Sénéchal, Ambrosian Opera Chorus, London Symphony Orchestra, CBS 1975
- Thomas - Mignon, with Marilyn Horne, Alain Vanzo, Ruth Welting, Nicola Zaccaria, Frederica von Stade, the Ambrosian Opera Chorus and the Philharmonia Orchestra, CBS Masterworks, 1978
- Tournemire - Symphony No. 7 'Les Danses de la Vie', Moscow Symphony Orchestra

== Awards ==
- Légion d'honneur, Chevalier (1976) and later Commandeur (1996)
- Ordre des Arts et des Lettres, Commandeur (1990)
