= Melchiorre Murenu =

- Born: 1803
- Died: 1854 (aged 50–51)
- Occupation: Poet

Melchiorre Murenu (Macomer 1803 – 1854) was a blind Sardinian poet. He is known as the "Homer of Sardinia" because (like Homer) he was blind.

At the age of three he became blind from smallpox.
