= Stringmansassy =

- Origin: Brisbane, Queensland, Australia
- Genres: Jazz; folk
- Years active: 1996-2008
- Label: MRA
- Past members: Kacey Patrick; Aaron Hopper

Stringmansassy were an Australian jazz folk duo formed in Brisbane, Queensland in 1996 by guitarist Aaron Hopper and vocalist Kacey Patrick. They performed a combination of jazz and folk, the group released three studio albums, Persuasion (2000), Beautiful Day (2003) and Dragonfly (2004). They disbanded in 2008.

Originally called Sassy and the Stringman they toured nationally and in Germany. Their music was played on radio networks including "Beautiful Day" which on high rotation by Australian Broadcasting Corporation radio.

== Discography ==
=== Albums ===
- Persuasion (2000)
- Beautiful Day (2003) - MRA Entertainment Group
- Dragonfly (2004) - MRA Entertainment Group
- The Live Experience: 2000/2008 (Double CD, 2008)
