= John Jacob Niles =

American musician (1892–1980)

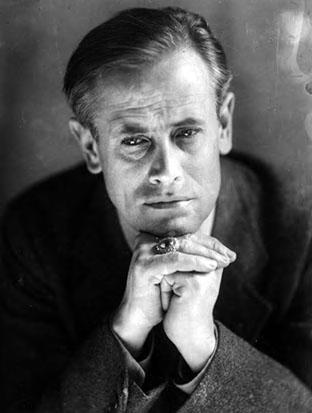
- John Jacob Niles
- Born: April 28, 1892; Louisville, Kentucky
- Died: March 1, 1980 (aged 87); Lexington, Kentucky
- Occupation: American musician
- Spouse: Rena Lipetz
- Children: Thomas Michael Tolliver and John Edward

John Jacob Niles (April 28, 1892 – March 1, 1980) was an American composer, singer and collector of traditional ballads. Called the "Dean of American Balladeers," Niles was an important influence on the American folk music revival of the 1950s and 1960s, with Odetta, Joan Baez, Burl Ives, Peter, Paul and Mary and Bob Dylan, among others, recording his songs.

== Biography ==
Born in Louisville, Kentucky, Niles learned music theory from his mother, and began writing down folk music as a teenager. He became a serious student of Appalachian folk music by transcribing traditional songs from oral sources while an itinerant employee of the Burroughs Corporation in eastern Kentucky, from 1910 to 1917. After serving in the U.S. Army Air Service during World War I, in which he was injured, he studied music in France, first in Lyon, then in Paris at the Schola Cantorum, also meeting Gertrude Stein. Returning to the United States in 1920, he continued his studies at the Cincinnati Conservatory of Music working there with Ralph Lyford. He sang opera in Chicago and folk songs on early radio. In 1925, he moved to New York City and held various jobs in the entertainment industry. In the 1930s, he toured Europe and the United States with contralto Marion Kerby. He performed at the White House in 1938, and on occasion at the Newport Folk Festival during the 1950s.

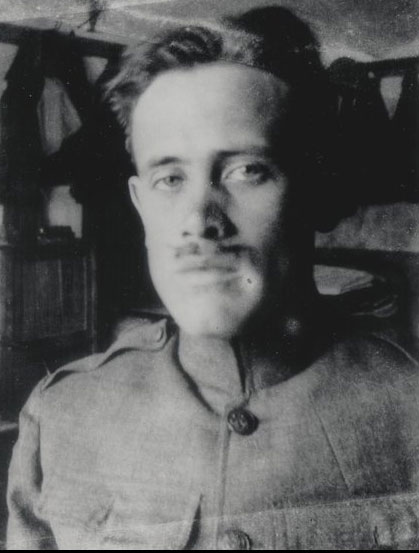
Lt. John Jacob Niles

In the 1920s, Niles began publishing music. He made four extended trips into the southern Appalachians as an assistant to photographer Doris Ulmann, again transcribing traditional songs from oral sources, including the ballads "Pretty Polly", "Barbara Allen", and "He's Goin' Away". On other occasions, he transcribed songs he heard sung by African Americans and by fellow soldiers in World War I.

Niles was also a noted songwriter. His songs, many based on traditional sources, include "Venezuela," and the haunting Christmas song "I Wonder As I Wander." Henry Miller's Plexus includes a powerful tribute to Niles's recording of this song. Niles composed "Go 'Way from My Window" when he was just 16 years old, but did not perform it until 1930. Marlene Dietrich recorded it and sang it on stage. Bob Dylan quoted its first line in his song "It Ain't Me Babe." His original new melody to the traditional folk song "Black Is the Color (Of My True Love's Hair)" was similarly influential in the folk revival of the 1950s and 1960s. Later in life, Niles published compositions in a more classical style, including works for choir and art songs for voice and piano. The latter include the Niles-Merton Songs, a collection of 22 art songs setting the poetry of Thomas Merton.

From 1938 he recorded a number of his compositions and transcribed songs, performing the material in an intense, dramatic manner. He employed a trademark very high falsetto vocal range that he described as the "electrifying effect of the male C# alto," and accompanied himself on his own self-constructed Appalachian dulcimers, which are instruments traditional to the Appalachian Mountains.

In 1936, he married Rena Lipetz. They settled on the Boot Hill farm in Clark County, Kentucky, with two sons, Thomas Michael Tolliver and John Edward, where they spent the rest of their lives.

Niles died in Lexington, Kentucky on March 1, 1980, at age 87. He is buried at the nearby St. Hubert's Episcopal Church in Clark County, KY. The John Jacob Niles Center for American Music at the University of Kentucky displays a number of traditional instruments he handcrafted.

== Discography ==
- Early American Ballads (1938, RCA Victor 78 rpm record album)
- Early American Carols & Folk Songs (1940, RCA Victor 78 rpm record album)
- American Folk Lore (Volume 3) (1941, RCA Victor 78 rpm record album)
- The Seven Joys Of Mary (1946, Disc Records 3×Shellac, 10" 78 record album)
- American Ballads And Folk Songs Vol. 2 (1946, Disc Records 3×Shellac, 10" 78 record album)
- American Folk Ballads, Vol. 1 (1952, Boone–Tolliver Records, 10" album)
- American Folk Love Songs To Dulcimer Accompaniment (1953, Boone–Tolliver Records, 10" album) rre-released as The Boone–Tolliver Recordings (2012, Living Music Dupli-cation)
- American Folk & Gambling Songs (1954, Camden Record LP)
- Sings American Folk Songs (1956, RCA Camden LP)
- 50th Anniversary Album (1956, RCA Camden LP)
- The Tradition Years: I Wonder as I Wander (1958, Tradition Records; 2006, Empire Musicwerks)
- An Evening With John Jacob Niles (1959, Tradition Records LP; 2002, Empire Musicwerks)
- The Ballads of John Jacob Niles (1960, Tradition Records LP; 2007, Empire Musicwerks)
- John Jacob Niles Sings Folk Songs (1964, Folkways Records LP)

Appearances on compilations etc.

- The Asch Recordings, 1939 to 1945 – Vol. 2 (1967, Folkways Records) contains "Little Mattie Groves".
- No Direction Home (2005, Bob Dylan documentary DVD) – contains a video clip of "Go 'Way From My Window".
- Mister Lonely (2007, directed by Harmony Korine) – contains "The Maid Freed from the Gallows".

== Books by Niles ==
- 1927 Singing Soldiers
- 1929 One man's war; the story of the Lafayette Escadrille (with Bert Hall)
- 1929 The Songs My Mother Never Taught Me (with Douglas Moore)
- 1934 Songs of the Hill Folk
- 1950 The Shape Note Study Book
- 1961 The Ballad Book of John Jacob Niles
- 1968 Singing Soldiers
- 1969 The Black Dress
- 1977 Brick Dust and Buttermilk

== Scores ==
- 1929 Seven Negro exaltations
- 1935 Ten Christmas carols from the Southern Appalachian Mountains
- 1945 The Anglo-American ballad study book: containing eight ballads in current tradition in the United States of America

== Films ==
- 1978. John Jacob Niles. Whitesburg, Kentucky: Appalshop.

== See also ==
- American folk music revival
