= Tia Blake =

American singer-songwriter and writer (1952–2015)

- Blake on the cover of her 1971 debut album

Background information
- Also known as: Tia Wallman
- Born: Christiana Elizabeth Wallman; April 13, 1952; Columbus, Georgia, U.S.
- Origin: Paris, France
- Died: June 17, 2015 (aged 63) Pinehurst, North Carolina, U.S.
- Genres: Folk
- Occupations: Singer-songwriter, writer, editor
- Instruments: Vocals, acoustic guitar
- Years active: 1971–1979
- Label: Société française de production

Christiana Elizabeth "Tia" Wallman (April 13, 1952 – June 17, 2015), known professionally as Tia Blake, was an American singer-songwriter and writer. She recorded the 1971 album Folk Songs & Ballads: Tia Blake and Her Folk-Group, which was released in France in a small pressing and reissued in 2011. Later accounts have described it as a lost or rediscovered folk album, and commentators have compared Blake with singers including Nick Drake and Nico.

Wallman was born in Columbus, Georgia, and grew up in North Carolina. In 1960, during a custody dispute, she and her siblings were kidnapped by her father, who worked for the Central Intelligence Agency (CIA). He was arrested after they were found and later fled the country. Wallman moved to Paris in 1970, formed Her Folk Group, recorded her only studio album, and performed once at the Théâtre du Vieux-Colombier in support of it. She later recorded demos and rehearsal tapes in Paris, moved to Montreal, recorded songs for CBC Radio, and sang backing vocals on a song by Daniel Lavoie.

After graduating from Smith College in 1989, Wallman worked as a freelance writer and editor. Under the name Tia Wallman, she published work in Granta, including a memoir about travelling to Saigon during the Vietnam War to search for her father. She also co-wrote a comedy piece with her mother that was performed at the 2007 New York Fringe Festival. Wallman died of breast cancer in 2015, aged 63.

== Biography ==
Christiana Elizabeth Wallman was born in Columbus, Georgia, on April 13, 1952, and grew up in North Carolina. She had six siblings. Her father, Jack, worked for the Central Intelligence Agency (CIA). In 1960, after her parents separated, he kidnapped Wallman and her siblings during a custody dispute and kept them for seven months. After the children were found, he was arrested and later fled the country.

In 1970, Wallman graduated from high school and worked for Farrar, Straus and Giroux in New York City for six months before moving to Paris. There she met Benito Merlino, a Sicilian folksinger, record-store owner and record producer. She learned to play guitar and spent time at Disco'Thé, a record shop in the Latin Quarter, where she sometimes sang. At the shop she met two young guitarists who played with her, forming Her Folk Group.

Merlino introduced Wallman to his contacts in the record industry. She met Michel Bachelet and Jean-Paul Smets, respectively the owner and artists and repertoire manager of Société française de production (SFP), a small French record label. They invited her to record her debut album at Pierre Barouh's Studios Saravah. She recorded an album of public-domain folk songs and ballads under the name Tia Blake, with the group accompanying her. It was released in France in 1971 as Folk Songs & Ballads: Tia Blake and Her Folk-Group, with few copies produced. A month after the album's release, Wallman and her group performed at the Théâtre du Vieux-Colombier to promote it. In 1973, she recorded demos and rehearsal tapes with a guitarist named Jack.

In September 1976, while living in Montreal, Wallman responded to a call from CBC Radio for songs by local artists. She recorded a demo tape of three originals at a CBC studio, including one song for her father and another for an old boyfriend. The producer found nothing usable and returned the tape to her. She later sang backing vocals on "Boule Qui Roule", a song from Daniel Lavoie's 1979 album Nirvana Bleu.

Wallman graduated from Smith College in 1989 and won the Elizabeth Drew Writing Prize. Living in North Carolina, she worked as a freelance writer and editor. She published two pieces in Granta under the name Tia Wallman. The first was a memoir about travelling to Saigon with her sister during the Vietnam War to find her father, who worked for the CIA; the second was published after her death. In 2006, she co-wrote a 10-minute comedy piece with her mother, Joan Blake, which was staged at the 2007 New York Fringe Festival.

In 2011, Wallman's debut album was reissued on CD by Water Music, together with her Paris demos and CBC Montreal recordings. The album has been described as a lost or rediscovered album, and it circulated among collectors during the 1990s and 2000s. Commentators have compared Blake with Nick Drake, Nico, Sibylle Baier, Bridget St. John, and Vashti Bunyan.

Wallman died of breast cancer in Pinehurst, North Carolina, on June 17, 2015, aged 63. She was buried next to her brothers Chris and Peter in North Hatley, Quebec, Canada. The Tia Blake Collection is held at Wilson Library in North Carolina and includes audio recordings, images, documents, and written works by Wallman.

== Works ==
=== Discography ===
- Folk Songs and Ballads: Tia Blake and Her Folk-group (LP), SFP, Paris, 1971.
  - Reissued by Water Music, California, in 2011, together with Paris demos (1973) and CBC Montreal recordings (1976)
  - Reissued and remastered by Ici Bientôt, Paris, in 2022
- Tia Blake, Paris and Montreal Demos 1973–1976 (EP), Yep Roc Records, 2018.

=== Publications ===
- "We Went to Saigon", Granta, July 14, 2006
- "Forbidden Games", Granta, March 9, 2017
