= Netania Davrath =

Israeli soprano opera and concert singer

- נתניה דברת
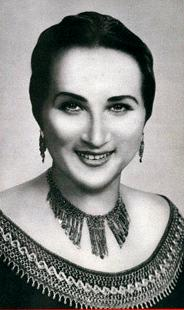
- Born: 12 August 1931; Ukraine
- Died: 11 April 1987 (aged 55)
- Education: Juilliard School; Jerusalem Academy of Music
- Occupation: Opera singer (soprano)
- Musical career
- Genres: Opera; Concert
- Instrument: Vocals
- Label: Vanguard Classics

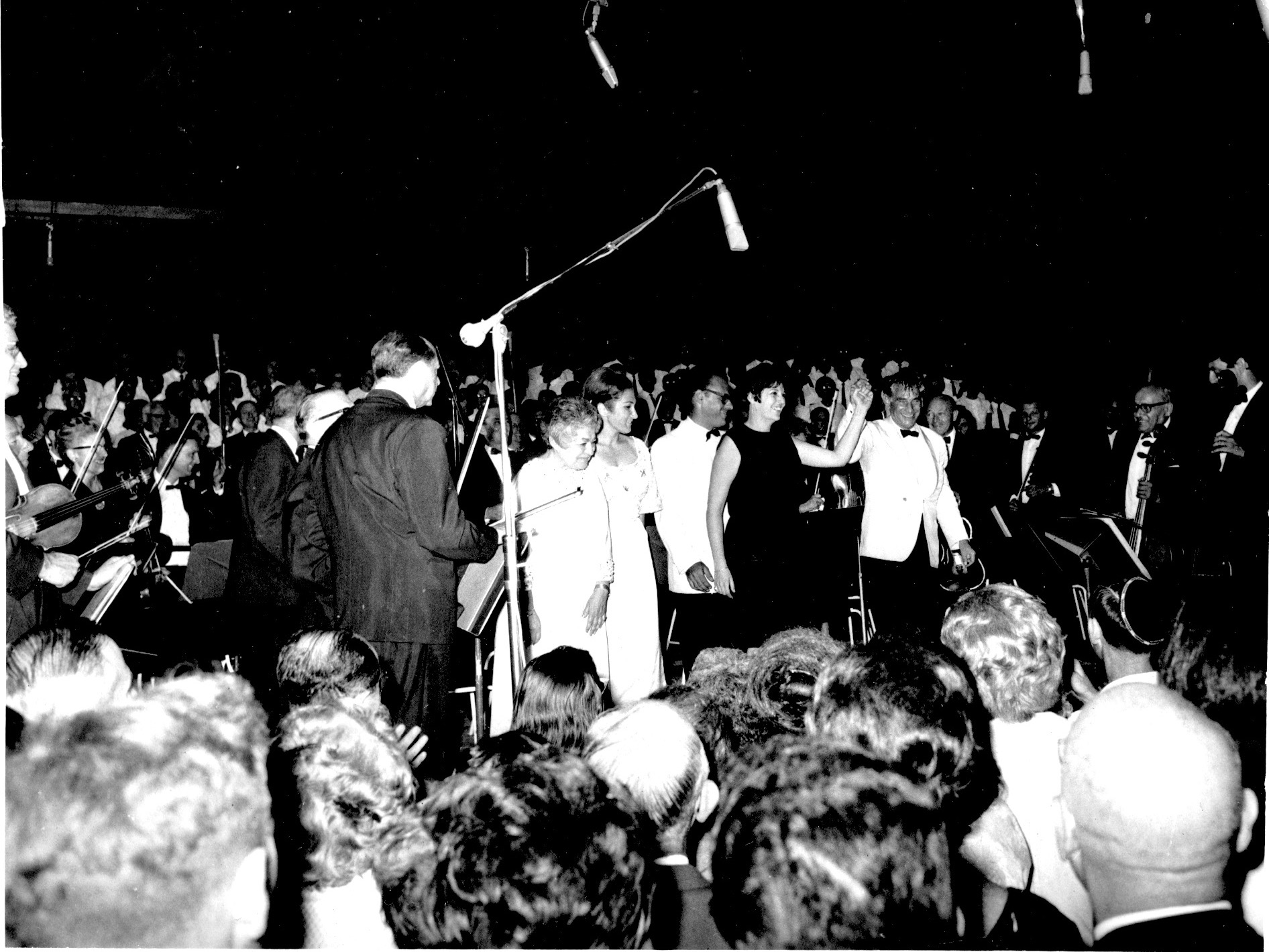
Jennie Tourel, Netania Davrath, Ruth Mense and Leonard Bernstein, 1967

Netania Davrath (Hebrew: נתניה דברת, Russian: Нетания Доврат; 12 August 1931 – 11 April 1987) was a Ukrainian-born Israeli soprano opera and concert singer.

== Early life and study ==
In 1948, Davrath moved to Israel with her family. There, she studied in Jerusalem with Edith Boroschek. She subsequently studied in Düsseldorf and later at the Juilliard School in New York with Jennie Tourel, as well as in Italy.

== Career ==
Davrath's repertoire included both opera and concert pieces. She collaborated with conductors Leonard Bernstein, John Barbirolli, Leopold Stokowski, Maurice Abravanel and Zubin Mehta and several orchestras: the New York Philharmonic, Chicago Symphony Orchestra, Utah Symphony, London Philharmonic, Israel Philharmonic, Lyric Opera of Chicago, and Opera Boston among others. She recorded ten discs under the Vanguard Classics label. Davrath was fluent in eight languages.

Her childhood years may have influenced her attraction to folk music, first in her native country Ukraine (then part of the Soviet Union), then later in Israel. These influences are reflected in her performance style; a delicate tone, clarity of enunciation, and agility. Her early recording of Joseph Canteloube's Chants d'Auvergne is considered by many to be unsurpassed.

Her voice is tender, strong, nasal, arch, shy, abandoned, free from vibrato, pure and clean and distinctly un-operatic. She has that platinum quality of voice that is unsophisticated and girlishly innocent. Going by track record this is not something that can be taught. You either have it or you don't. Davrath's facility in eight languages undoubtedly aids her interpretations which are always intelligent and which do not give the impression of being phonetically acquired.

— Rob Barnett, music critic
