= I Wonder as I Wander =

Christian folk song

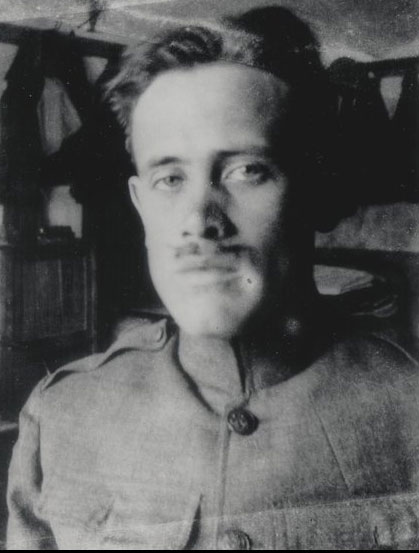
- John Jacob Niles
- Genre: Christmas
- Language: English

"I Wonder as I Wander" is a Christian folk hymn, typically performed as a Christmas carol, written by American folklorist and singer John Jacob Niles. The hymn has its origins in a song fragment collected by Niles on July 16, 1933.

While in the town of Murphy in Appalachian North Carolina, Niles attended a fundraising meeting held by evangelicals who had been ordered out of town by the police. In his unpublished autobiography, he wrote of hearing the song:

A girl had stepped out to the edge of the little platform attached to the automobile. She began to sing. Her clothes were unbelievable dirty and ragged, and she, too, was unwashed. Her ash-blond hair hung down in long skeins. ... But, best of all, she was beautiful, and in her untutored way, she could sing. She smiled as she sang, smiled rather sadly, and sang only a single line of a song.

The girl, named Annie Morgan, repeated the fragment seven times in exchange for a quarter per performance, and Niles left with "three lines of verse, a garbled fragment of melodic material—and a magnificent idea". (In various accounts of this story, Niles hears between one and three lines of the song.) Based on this fragment, Niles composed the version of "I Wonder as I Wander" that is known today, extending the melody to four lines and the lyrics to three stanzas. His composition was completed on October 4, 1933. Niles first performed the song on December 19, 1933, at the John C. Campbell Folk School in Brasstown, North Carolina. It was originally published in Songs of the Hill Folk in 1934.

Niles's "folk composition" process caused confusion among singers and listeners, many of whom believed this song to be anonymous in origin. Niles undertook lawsuits to establish its authorship and demanded royalties of other performers of the song.

The biography of Niles by Ronald Pen uses the song title: I Wonder as I Wander: The Life of John Jacob Niles (Lexington: University Press of Kentucky, 2010. ISBN 978-0-8131-2597-8).

== Setting and arrangements ==
"I Wonder as I Wander", since its collection, has always been sung to the melody published by Niles. According to academic and theologian Ian Bradley, the "clean, haunting melody ... maintains the open-air atmosphere and sense of wistful wandering conjured up in the first line."

A setting of the tune is part of Benjamin Britten's folk song arrangements for both high/medium and medium/low voice. The arrangement was originally published by G. Schirmer in 1934.

Barbra Streisand recorded the song in 1967 for A Christmas Album.

Luciano Berio set it for soprano and ensemble as part of his Folk Songs in 1964: the song cycle was composed for, and recorded by, Cathy Berberian.

Mary Travers of Peter, Paul, and Mary also covered this song in their PBS Special The Holiday Concert in 1988.

A notable recent choral setting by Swiss composer Carl Rütti, with the original words and an entirely new melody, has been performed at the Festival of Nine Lessons and Carols at King's College Chapel, University of Cambridge.

Westminster Choir College performs an arrangement by Steve Pilkington annually at its Readings and Carols concert.

Singer Vanessa Williams recorded a version in her Christmas album Star Bright.

Multi-instrumentalist Joe Weed arranged the song for his 1994 album Prairie Christmas.

Wovenhand provides an experimental/ambient folk rendition of the song on the Christian indie folk label Sounds Familyre's first Christmas compilation.

Hammered dulcimer artist Joshua Messick provides a version on his 2018 album Hammered Dulcimer Christmas Vol. II.

Violinist Lindsey Stirling recorded it for the 2018 deluxe edition of her 2017 Christmas album, Warmer in the Winter.

The John Rutter arrangement is performed by iamthemorning on their 2020 EP, Counting The Ghosts.

American DJ and electro musician Kaskade released a downtempo, lo-fi cover version of the hymn for his Christmas album Kaskade Christmas Volume 2, featuring vocals by Canadian singer-songwriter Jamie Fine.

== See also ==
- List of Christmas carols
