= Ensemble Planeta =

Japanese a cappella group

- Origin: Japan
- Genres: Classical Crossover
- Years active: 2001–present
- Label: Pony Canyon
- Members: Hanae Tomaru; Kazuyo Kitazume; Misako Ito; Akiko Tano

Ensemble Planeta (アンサンブル・プラネタ, Ansanburu Puraneta) is a Japanese all female a cappella group. Known for their performance of the works of Bach, Chopin, Schubert and other classical composers and traditional European folk music. The group was formed by Nahoko Kakiage, the recognized creator of classical crossover style of music in Japan.

== Membership ==
=== Current members ===
- Hanae Tomaru – Soprano
- Kazuyo Kitazume – Mezzo Soprano
- Misako Ito – Soprano
- Kai Torii – Mezzo Soprano, since 2018

=== Previous Members ===
- Tateishi Rei (立石玲) - Soprano, left in 2002
- Michiko Takahashi (高橋美千子) - Soprano, left in 2006
- Etsuko Murata (村田悦子) - Alto, left in 2007
- Yoshiko Ikeshiro (池城淑子) – Soprano, left in 2009
- Akiko Tano – Mezzo Soprano

== Discography ==
- Ensemble Planeta アンサンブル・プラネタ（2001）
- Maiden's Lament 乙女の嘆き（2002）
- ARIA 麗しのアリア（2003）
- étoile エトワール（2003）
- romance 愛のロマンス（2004）
- Choral コラール（2005）
- Largo ラルゴ（2006）
- A Capella - The Japanese Lyrical Songs ア・カペラ-日本の叙情歌（2009）
- Eternal Harmony (Compilation) プラチナムベスト アンサンブル・プラネタ -永遠のハーモニー（2015）
- This Flower この花（2018）
- Planeta (compositions by Kakiage Nahoko) (2019)

== Performances ==
They have also made TV/CM appearances over the years such as the TV commercial for pharmaceutical company ARAX’s Norshin. They also sang the theme song for the Spanish movie El Viaje De Carol and performed the soundtrack for the Studio Ghibli animation movie Taneyamagahara No Yoru. They are also constantly touring, playing concert halls all across Japan as well as performances in Korea and Hong Kong.
