= Nyle Wolfe =

Irish operatic baritone (born 1971)

- Birth name: Nyle Patrick Wolfe
- Born: October 1971 (age 53)
- Genres: Operatic
- Occupation(s): Opera and concert singer (baritone)
- Instrument: Vocals
- Years active: 1989–present
- Website: nylewolfe.com

Nyle Wolfe (born October 1971) is an Irish operatic baritone, who has sung with the Musiktheater im Revier in Germany and Opera Ireland. His first solo album Moodswings was released in Ireland in 2007.

Wolfe trained as a singer at the Cork School of Music, Leinster School of Music & Drama, Dublin, and the Royal Academy of Music, London, followed by further studies at the Opera Studio at Zurich Opera House. He sang Don Pedro in Béatrice et Bénédict in Baden-Baden and Paris with European Opera. In Dublin he sang in Salome and Lady Macbeth of the Mtsensk District with Opera Ireland. At the Zurich Opera House he sang Baculus in Der Wildschütz.

In 2000, Wolfe was engaged as principal lyric baritone at the Musiktheater im Revier where he sang in many performances, including Dandini in La Cenerentola, Belcore in L'elisir d'amore, Guglielmo in Così fan tutte, Figaro in The Barber of Seville and in the German premiere of Roland Moser's Avatar. At the Ruhrtriennale Festival he sang the world premiere of Alexander Mullenbach's Die Todesbrücke which was revived at the Théâtre National de Luxemburg. Wolfe was also guest with other opera companies, including Opera Ireland for the Irish premiere of Mark-Anthony Turnage's The Silver Tassie and in Cologne in La finta giardiniera.

In November 2006, Nyle returned to Cork Opera House as Figaro in Rossini's Barber of Seville with Opera 2005. The production was nominated for a theatre award by The Irish Times.

He released his album Moodwings in 2007 and went on a national concert tour of Ireland. In 2010 gave a recital at the National Concert Hall Dublin, appeared in a puppet driven production of The Magic Flute in Cork, Romeo and Juliet in Dublin, and sang the role of Sciarrone in Tosca—Opera Ireland's last production before its closure.
