= Madeleine Grey =

French singer (1896–1979)

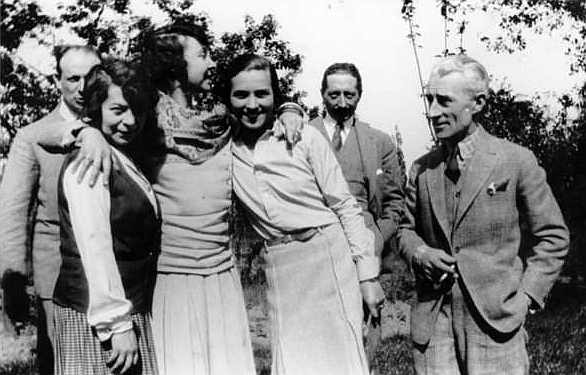
- From left to right: Hélène Jourdan-Morhange, Madeleine Grey, Germaine Malançon and Maurice Ravel in 1925
- Born: Madeleine Nathalie Grumberg; 11 June 1896; Villaines-la-Juhel
- Died: 13 March 1979 (aged 82); 18th arrondissement of Paris
- Education: Paris Conservatoire
- Occupation: classical singer

Madeleine Grey (11 June 1896 – 13 March 1979) was a French classical singer whose voice is usually described as soprano but which also encompassed a mezzo-soprano repertoire.

== Early life ==
Madeleine Grey (née Madeleine Nathalie Grumberg) was born in Villaines-la-Juhel, Mayenne, in France in 1896 into a Jewish background. Her musical studies took her to the Paris Conservatoire to study both the piano, with Alfred Cortot, and singing, with Amédée-Louis Hettich. Her exceptional promise as a singer was soon recognised, and she gave her début concert with the Pasdeloup Orchestra in Paris in 1919.

== Career ==
This first concert was attended by Gabriel Fauré and Maurice Ravel, both of whom went on to work closely with her in performances of their works. Fauré accompanied her in the first performance of his song cycle Mirages in December 1919. For Ravel she gave the first performances of the orchestral version of his Deux mélodies hébraïques in 1920, and the Chansons madécasses in 1926. Her other associations with Ravel included a concert tour with him in Spain in 1928, participation in the Ciboure festival for the composer in 1930, and singing at a memorial concert after his death. Joseph Canteloube dedicated to her a set of his Chants d'Auvergne, and she gave the first performance of them in 1926, achieving considerable popular success. Her repertoire also included works by Ottorino Respighi, Heitor Villa-Lobos, Darius Milhaud and Arthur Honegger.

Grey travelled widely, especially in Italy and the United States, appearing at many festivals. She sometimes experienced the rising influence of antisemitism, such as in 1933 when her engagement at a concert in Florence was abruptly cancelled and she was replaced by another singer. When war with Germany broke out in 1939 she was abroad, and did not return to France until 1947. She lived in Paris again from 1952, and died there in 1979.

== Reputation ==
Ravel provided an early account of Grey's voice in a letter recommending her to the conductor Ernest Ansermet: "She is one of the most remarkable interpreters: an attractive voice, fairly powerful, and very clear. And, very notably, perfect diction. Thanks to her, people have heard Shéhérazade as something other than a symphonic poem." This view has been endorsed by a modern critic on the basis of her recordings: "Her voice is strong and clear, her diction excellent, her interpretations were individual and intelligent."

== Recordings ==
In 1930, Grey made the first recording of a selection of the Chants d'Auvergne by Canteloube (chosen from series I-III and filling 7 sides of 78 rpm records, 1 one of which was not issued). In 1932, she also made recordings of Ravel's Chansons madécasses, the Deux mélodies hébraïques and the Chanson hébraïque (6 sides of 78 rpm) which were supervised by the composer and which therefore demonstrate his expectations of performance. All of these recordings have been re-issued on CD (Pearl GEMM 0013).

== Publications ==
Grey, Madeleine. "Souvenirs d'une interprète", in Revue musicale, n.185–187 (1938), (p. 367).
