= Larry Mathews (musician) =

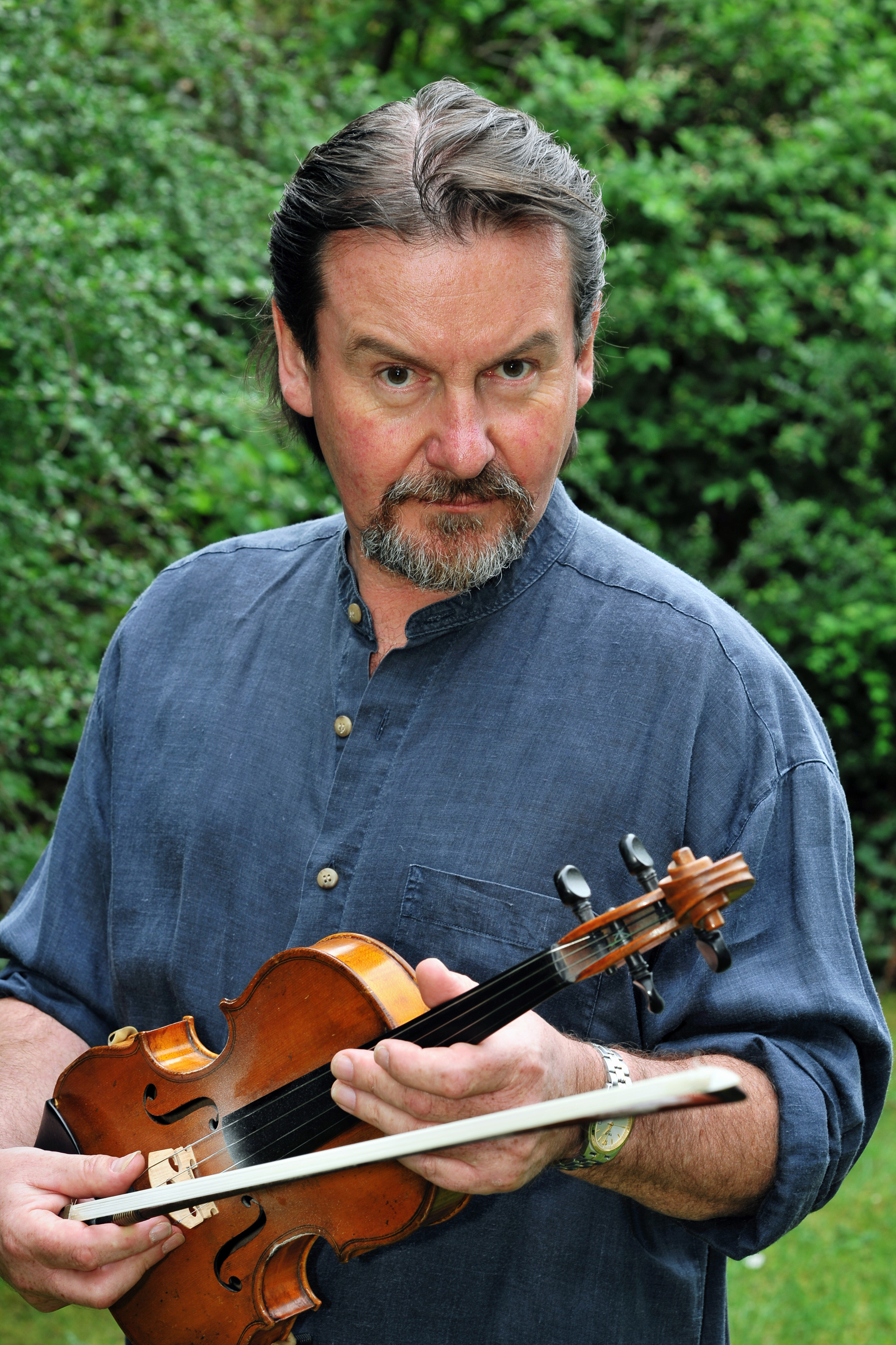
Larry Mathews, April 2009

Larry Mathews is a musician from Glenbeigh in the Irish County Kerry. He sings and plays Irish Folk, his own compositions as well as Rock and Pop. He plays Irish Fiddle, Guitar and Bodhrán (the Irish frame drum). On stage he has played with Christy Moore, the Furey Brothers, The Dubliners, Achim Reichel and many others. He has recorded with Martin Röttger, as guest musician for Chris Evans & David Hanselmann, Hannes Wader and with many others.

== Early career ==
At the age of eight years Larry Mathews started playing the violin. Five years later the guitar became his second instrument. Together with his brother Terry, who plays banjo, mandolin and guitar, he toured Ireland and Great Britain as one of the folk duo Mathews Brothers, and they also had some appearances on radio and television. In the following years they played at festivals in Scandinavia, Germany, Belgium the Netherlands, Switzerland and the USA.

== Recordings ==
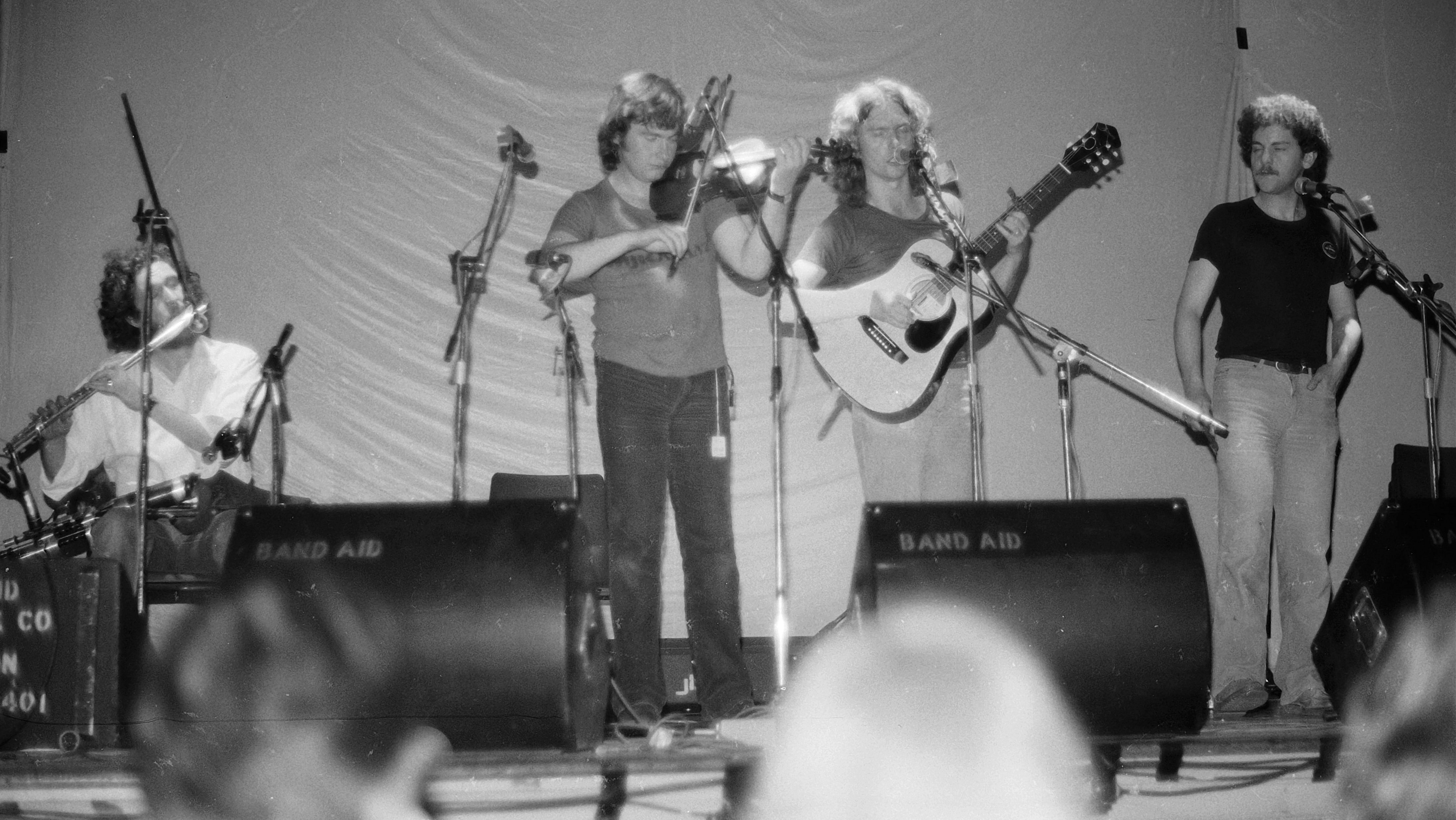
Larry Mathews (second from left) with the Mathews-Wilson-Doonan Band in 1981

In 1977 he recorded the album A Kiss in the Morning Early together with his brother Terry. With Tony Wilson and Mick Doonan as additional musicians they recorded the album Mathews' Wilson And Doonan.

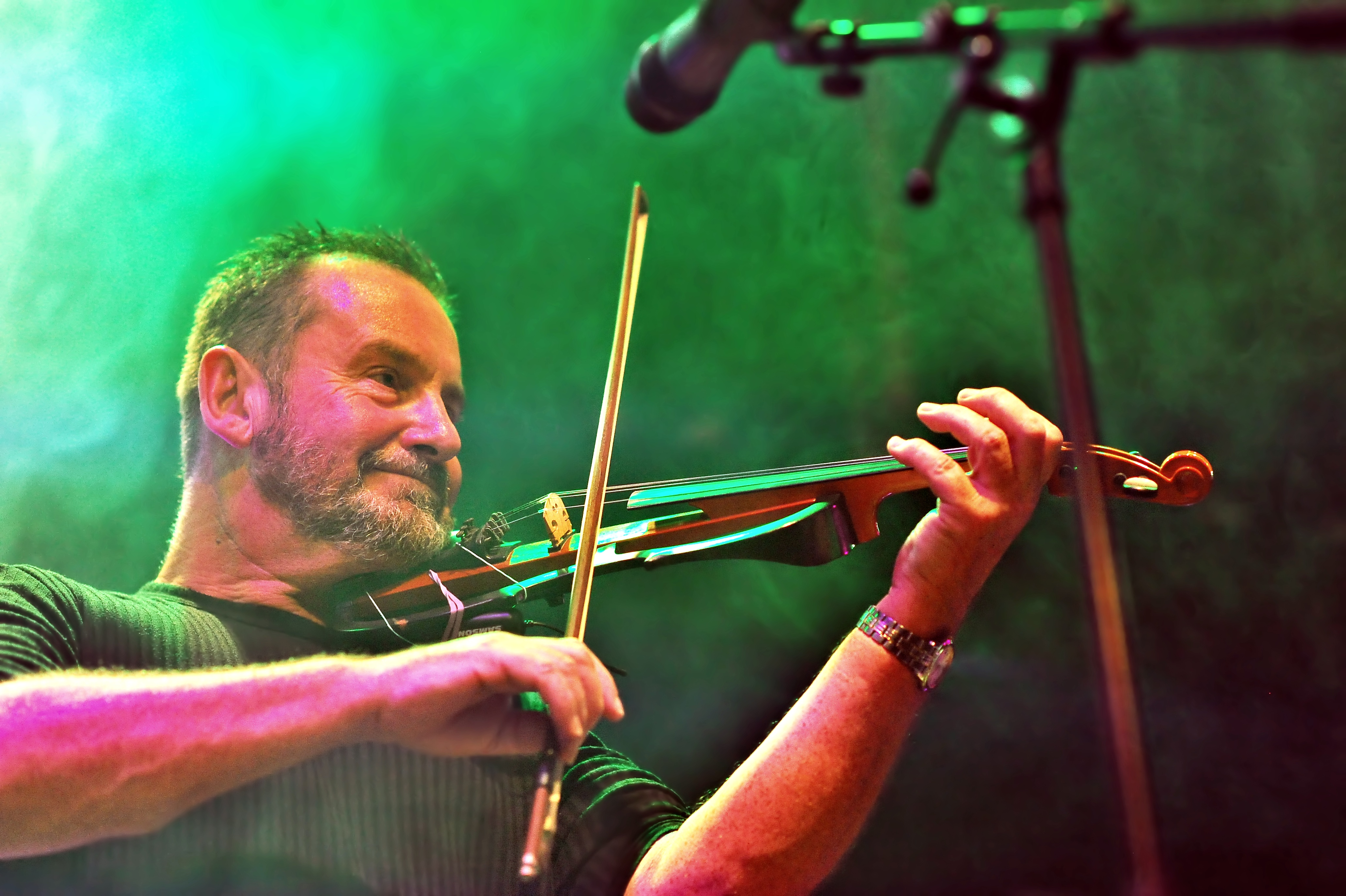
Larry Mathews, November 2014

With the Irish folk band Spáilpín, he reached high positions in the Irish charts, including with The Maggie Thatcher Song, which was banned by the public broadcaster of Ireland RTÉ.

== Music tours ==
Since November 2000, Mathews, now living in Hamburg, Germany, has been accompanied by Ralph Bühr from Seevetal on Mandolin and Guitar. In 2003 they were joined by bass player Björn Beutler from Hamburg. They founded the band Larry Mathews Blackstone, named after a bridge over the river Caragh in the Irish County Kerry. In 2010 Björn Beutler left the Band and Andy Schmidt took over the bass. The same year Bernd Haseneder joined the trio to play Bodhrán and Cajón. Since the beginning of 2014, Henning Wulf is a member of the "Larry Mathews Blackstone Band". He plays whistles, banjo, mandolin, harmonica and the Irish bagpipe, the "Uilleann Pipes".

As a solo musician Larry Mathews is touring Europe, Canada and the US with fiddle, guitar and Bodhrán. In 2012 and 2013 Mathews was one of two musicians accompanying Achim Reichel on his Solo mit Euch (Solo with You) Tour of Germany.

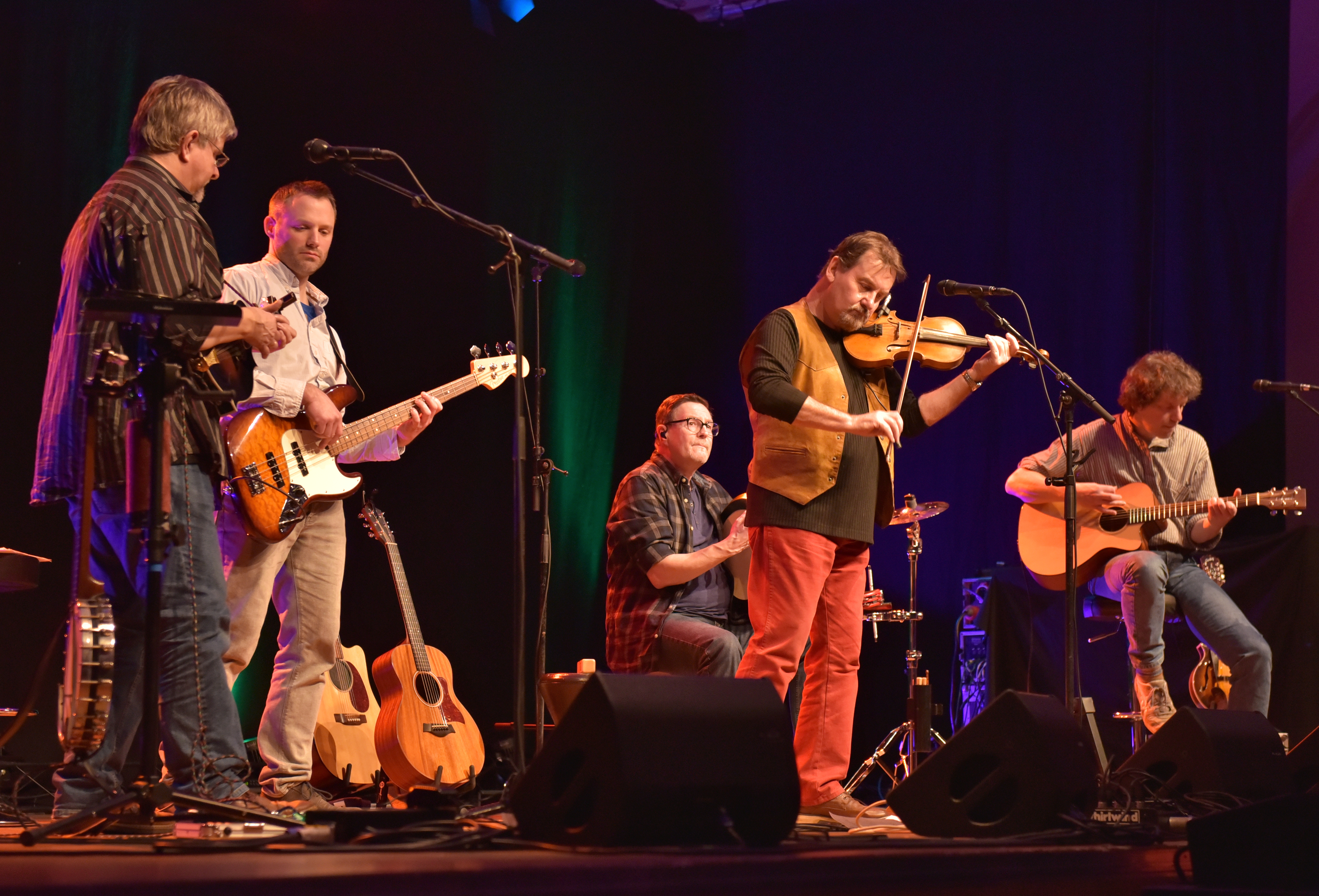
Larry Mathews' Blackstone Band, Kolosseum Lübeck, March 2018

== Discography ==
- 2016: Larry Mathews: "Falls On You", CD
- 2014: Larry Mathews: "Stuck here inside", EP, with Stefan Wehrmann (electric guitars, bass guitar, backing vocals), Moncef Dellandrea (drums, keyboards)
- 2006: Larry Mathews Blackstone: "Solid Ground", CD, with de:Martin Röttger (Cajón)
- 2003: Larry Mathews: "Easy and Slow", CD, with Ralf Bühr (mandolin, guitar), Tony O'Flaherty (bass, keyboard), Uiairi O'Flaherty (guitar), Patrick O'Connor (drums)
- 2000: Larry Mathews: "To Ferry Me Over" (re-issue 2011)
- 1981: "Mathews' Wilson And Doonan", LP with Tony Wilson (guitar, mandolin, bass, banjo, vocals), Mick Doonan (Uilleann Pipes, Piccolo and Irish flute ("Whistle"), vocals), Rola Records R009
- 1977/78: The Mathews Brothers: "A kiss in the Morning Early", LP, Canon Records Ltd CNN 5959 (1977), Avada Records AVA 101 (1978)
