= Dawn Upshaw =

American soprano (born 1960)

- Born: July 17, 1960 (age 66); Nashville, Tennessee, U.S.
- Education: Illinois Wesleyan University; Manhattan School of Music
- Occupation: Soprano
- Years active: 1984–present
- Employer(s): Bard College Conservatory of Music; Tanglewood Music Center
- Children: 2

Dawn Upshaw (born July 17, 1960) is an American soprano. She is the recipient of several Grammy Awards and has released a number of Edison Award-winning discs. She performs both opera and art song, and her repertoire spans Baroque to contemporary. Many composers, including Henri Dutilleux, Osvaldo Golijov, John Harbison, Esa-Pekka Salonen, David Bruce, John Adams, and Kaija Saariaho, have written for her. In 2007, she was awarded a MacArthur Fellowship. In 2006, she founded the Graduate Vocal Arts Program at Bard College Conservatory of Music in Annandale-on-Hudson, New York, serving as artistic director until 2019. She serves as head of the Vocal Arts Program at the Tanglewood Music Center in Lenox, Massachusetts.

== Career ==
In 2006, Upshaw founded the Graduate Vocal Arts Program at Bard College Conservatory in Annandale-on-Hudson, New York, serving as artistic director until 2019, when she was succeeded by Stephanie Blythe. She serves as head of the Vocal Arts Program at Tanglewood Music Center in Lenox, Massachusetts.

Upshaw appears on an album of Christmas music together with the male vocal ensemble Chanticleer, titled Christmas with Chanticleer featuring special guest Dawn Upshaw for Teldec Classics.

She is an Andrew Dickson White Professor-at-Large at Cornell University from 2020 to 2026.

== Personal life ==
Upshaw was born on July 17, 1960, in Nashville, Tennessee. She is a mother of two. In 2006, she was diagnosed with and treated for early-stage breast cancer.

== Awards and recognition ==
1989 Grammy Award for Best Classical Vocal Soloist

- Knoxville: Summer of 1915 (Music of Barber, Menotti, Harbison, Stravinsky)

1991 Grammy Award for Best Classical Vocal Soloist

- The Girl with Orange Lips (Falla, Ravel, etc.)

2003 Grammy Award for Best Chamber Music Performance

- The Kronos Quartet & Dawn Upshaw for Berg: Lyric Suite

2006 Grammy Award for Best Opera Recording

- The Atlanta Symphony and chorus with Dawn Upshaw for Golijov: Ainadamar (Fountain of Tears)

2007 MacArthur Fellowship

2014 Grammy Award for Best Classical Vocal Soloist

- Winter Morning Walks (Maria Schneider)

== Selected discography ==
- 1990: Marc-Antoine Charpentier: Te deum H.146, Magnificat H.74, Kurt Moll, bass, John Aler, tenor, Dawn Upshaw, soprano, Ethna Robinson, contralto, Ann Muray, soprano and contralto, Academy of St Martin in the Fields, conducted by Neville Marriner. CD EMI classics, 1991
- 1991: Wolfgang Amadeus Mozart: Le Nozze di Figaro, conducted by James Levine, Deutsche Grammophon, 435 488-2
- 1992: Jules Massenet: Chérubin, conducted by Pinchas Steinberg, RCA Victor Red Seal CD, 09026-60593-2
- 1992: Henryk Górecki: Symphony No. 3, Nonesuch/Elektra Records CD, 79282
- 2005: James Levine's 25th Anniversary Metropolitan Opera Gala (1996), Deutsche Grammophon DVD, B0004602-09
- 2005: Ayre (Golijov), Deutsche Grammophon CD, 00289 477 5414
