= Dr K–Sextett =

The Dr K–Sextett is a short, occasional composition for six instrumentalists, written in 1969 by Karlheinz Stockhausen and given the number 28 in his catalogue of works.

== History ==
The Sextet was composed as the result of a request made to eleven composers in January 1969 by the London office of Universal Edition for short pieces of music to celebrate the 80th birthday of Dr. Alfred Kalmus, who had been Universal's London director since 1936. All of the pieces were scored for performance by members of the Pierrot Players. Collectively titled A Garland for Dr. K., the eleven works were premiered by the Pierrot Players on 22 April 1969 at the Queen Elizabeth Hall in the Southbank Centre, London, on a programme that also included the world premieres of Eight Songs for a Mad King by Peter Maxwell Davies, and Linoi II by Harrison Birtwistle. Seven years later (by which time Boulez's contribution had been expanded to a quintet), a recording of the entire Garland was made by a Spanish ensemble directed by Cristóbal Halffter for an LP produced by Universal Edition.

== Analysis ==
The Sextet is scored for flute, bass clarinet, percussion (tubular bells and vibraphone), viola, violoncello, and piano, and may be described as a synthesis of closed and open formal development. The work consists of 26 periodic phases, each lasting eight seconds, for a total duration of 3 minutes and 36 seconds. Its formal process sets out from an eight-note cluster chord in the middle register, from A3 up to E4, first struck very loudly, then repeated eight seconds later at a very soft dynamic. At subsequent eight-second intervals, the instruments gradually gain independence of attack points while at the same time add more notes, both higher and lower, until a maximum dispersal of attack points is reached in the middle of the piece. From there to the end, the attack points reverse the process until chordal unity is reached again at the end, but the pitches continue to expand until reaching their widest at six octaves in the last three phases, then suddenly collapsing to a seven-note chord at the very end.

== Discography ==
- A Garland for Dr. K.: Kompositionen zum 80. Geburtstag von Dr. Alfred A. Kalmus. David Bedford: Garland for Dr. K; Hugh Wood: Garland for Dr. K.; Pierre Boulez: Pour le Dr. Kalmus, for flute, clarinet, viola, violoncello, and piano; Richard Rodney Bennett: Impromptus, for flute; Luciano Berio: The Modification and Instrumentation of a Famous Hornpipe as a Merry and Altogether Sincere Homage to Uncle Alfred, for flute, clarinet, percussion, harpsichord, viola, and cello; Cristóbal Halffter: Oda para felicitar a un amigo; Roman Haubenstock-Ramati: Rounds; Harrison Birtwistle: Some Petals from My Twickenham Herbarium [aka Some Petals from the Garland], for piccolo, piano, glockenspiel, clarinet, violin, and violoncello; Karlheinz Stockhausen: Für Dr K; Bernard Rands: Monotone; Henri Pousseur: Echos II de Votre Faust, for mezzo-soprano, flute, violoncello, and piano. (Recorded in the Studio Audiofilm, Madrid, 1976) Vicente Sempere Gomis (flute); José Vadillo Vadillo, Vicente Lafuente Maurín (clarinets); Juán Luis Jordá Ayats (violin); Pablo Ceballos Gomez (viola); Angel Gonzalez Quiñones (cello); Felix Puertas Villahoz (percussion); Maria Manuela Care de Halffter, Maria Elena Barrientos (piano); Cristóbal Halffter (cond.). LP recording. Universal Edition UE 15043; Interdisc ID 104. London: Universal Edition, 1976.
- The California EAR Unit. Arthur Jarvinen: Egyptian Two Step; Rand Steiger: Quintessence; Michael Torke: The Yellow Pages; Karlheinz Stockhausen: Dr K Sextet; Elliott Carter: Enchanted Preludes; Elliott Carter: Esprit Rude/Esprit Doux; Elliott Carter: Canon for 4—Homage to William; Louis Andriessen: Hoketus. Dorothy Stone (piccolo, flute, bass flute, panpipes); James Rohrig (clarinet, bass clarinet, alto saxophone, baritone saxophone); Theresa Tunnicliff (clarinet); Amy Knoles (percussion); Arthur Jarvinen (percussion, chromatic harmonica, compressed-air spray cans, electric bass); Lorna Eder and Gaylord Mowrey (piano, electric piano); Robin Lorenz (violin); Erika Duke (cello, panpipes); Toby Holmes (electric bass); Rand Steiger (cond.) CD recording. New Albion NA 019 CD. San Francisco: New Albion Records, 1989.
