= A Garland for Dr. K. =

A Garland for Dr. K. is a set of eleven short compositions created in 1969 for the celebration of the eightieth birthday of Dr Alfred Kalmus, the director of the London branch of Universal Edition. It is also the title of an album containing these eleven pieces of music, recorded in 1976.

== History ==
The Garland was initiated in January 1969 by the London office of Universal Edition, who invited eleven composers with close ties to their director, Dr. Alfred Kalmus, to write short pieces of music to celebrate his 80th birthday. All of the pieces were to be scored for performance by members of the Pierrot Players. The works were premiered as a group by the Pierrot Players on 22 April 1969, at the Queen Elizabeth Hall in the Southbank Centre, London, in a programme that also included the world premieres of Eight Songs for a Mad King by Peter Maxwell Davies, and Linoi II by Harrison Birtwistle. Seven years later, a recording of the entire Garland was made by a Spanish ensemble directed by Cristóbal Halffter for an LP produced by Universal Edition.

== Constituent parts ==
The eleven composers and their contributions are:

- David Bedford: Garland for Dr. K, for flute (+ piccolo, alto flute), clarinet (+ bass clarinet), violin (+ viola), cello, and piano (+ harpsichord)
- Hugh Wood: Garland for Dr. K, for flute, clarinet, violin, cello and piano
- Pierre Boulez: Improvisé—pour le Dr. Kalmus, a quintet for flute, clarinet, viola, violoncello, and piano (only an extract for unaccompanied clarinet was performed at the premiere)
- Richard Rodney Bennett: Impromptus, for solo flute
- Luciano Berio: The Modification and Instrumentation of a Famous Hornpipe as a Merry and Altogether Sincere Homage to Uncle Alfred, for flute, clarinet, percussion, harpsichord, viola, and cello
- Cristóbal Halffter: Oda para felicitar a un amigo, for flute, bass clarinet, percussion, piano (+ celesta), viola, and cello
- Roman Haubenstock-Ramati: Rounds (Mobile), for flute, clarinet, vibraphone, piano, viola, and cello
- Harrison Birtwistle: Some Petals from My Twickenham Herbarium, for piccolo, piano, glockenspiel, clarinet, violin, and violoncello
- Karlheinz Stockhausen: Für Dr K, for flute, bass clarinet, percussion (tubular bells and vibraphone), viola, violoncello, and piano
- Bernard Rands: Monotone, for flute, clarinet, percussion, piano (+ harpsichord), viola, and cello
- Henri Pousseur: Echos II de Votre Faust, originally a duet for flute and cello, with a brief piano accompaniment at the end; later expanded for mezzo-soprano, flute, violoncello, and piano

The pieces by Wood and Birtwistle both quoted the well-known American "Happy Birthday to You" tune (the former was "fast, spirited, interestingly mysterious" and the latter a "soft antiphonal piece involving nice high trills"), while Berio's contribution was a scoring of Henry Purcell's "There's Not a Swain" with added hesitations and paraphrases. Boulez offered a clarinet solo reminiscent of the same composer's Domaines, a piece "full of lively squeals", which was apparently part of the quintet for flute, clarinet, viola, cello, and piano, played a few weeks later at a private function on Alfred Kalmus' actual birthday. This was later revised and retitled Improvisé—pour le Dr. K, and published in a final revision for the composer's own 80th birthday in 2005.

Bennett's Impromptu was a slow, quietly undulating solo flute piece, while David Bedford delighted the audience with quick-change instrumentation which, amongst other things, required Alan Hacker to play two clarinets simultaneously, and Duncan Druce two violins. Bedford later (1999) rescored this work for saxophone quartet. Stockhausen offered a sextet that slowly unfolded from its opening chord, with rhythms expanding from initial unison to increasing independence and back again, while the pitches continually expand to the end. Pousseur's Echos II de votre Faust was mainly a whimsical duet for violin and cello in parallel fourths, with some added material in the piano toward the end. This proved to be part of the larger work Echos de Votre Faust, for mezzo-soprano, flute, piano, and cello, begun two years earlier. Halffter's post-Webern Oda was judged as only partially successful, Haubenstock-Ramati's contribution as "pleasantly nondescript", and Rands's piece was described merely as "very terse".

== Discography ==
Complete

- A Garland for Dr. K.: Kompositionen zum 80. Geburtstag von Dr. Alfred A. Kalmus. Recorded in the Studio Audiofilm, Madrid, 1976. Vicente Sempere Gomis (flute); José Vadillo Vadillo, Vicente Lafuente Maurín (clarinets); Juán Luis Jordá Ayats (violin); Pablo Ceballos Gomez (viola); Angel Gonzalez Quiñones (cello); Felix Puertas Villahoz (percussion); Maria Manuela Care de Halffter, Maria Elena Barrientos (piano); Cristóbal Halffter (cond.). LP recording. Universal Edition UE 15043; Interdisc ID 104. London: Universal Edition, 1976.

Individual pieces

- Bennett: Richard Rodney Bennett, Alexa Still, flute: Summer Music, Sonatina, Winter Music, Impromptu for Flute, Memento. Alexa Still (flute), Susan DeWitt Smith (piano), New Zealand Chamber Orchestra, James Sedares (cond.). CD recording. Koch International Classics 7505. [New York]: Koch International Classics, 2000.
- Berio: Orchestral Transcriptions. Quattro versioni originali della "Ritirata notturna di Madrid"; Rendering; Sonata for Clarinet and Piano No. 1 in F minor, Op. 120, by Johannes Brahms; Variations for 2 Basset Horns and Strings on "Ein Mädchen oder Weibchen"; The Modification and Instrumentation of a Famous Hornpipe; Contrapunctus XIX from J. S. Bach's Die Kunst der Fuge. Fausto Ghiazza (clarinet), Orchestra Sinfonica di Milano Giuseppe Verdi, Riccardo Chailly (cond.). CD recording. Decca 4762830. London: Decca, 2005.
- Boulez: Pierre Boulez Complete Works. CD recording, 13 audio discs: digital; 12 cm; stereo. Deutsche Grammophon 4806828. CD6, Improvisé—pour Dr. Kalmus, Ensemble intercontemporain: Emmanuelle Ophèle (flute); Alain Billard (clarinet), Sébastien Vichard (piano); Odile Auboin (viola); Eric-Maria Couturier (cello). [Hamburg]: Deutsche Grammophon, 2013. Universal Music.
- Stockhausen: The California EAR Unit. Arthur Jarvinen: Egyptian Two Step; Rand Steiger: Quintessence; Michael Torke: The Yellow Pages; Karlheinz Stockhausen: Dr K Sextet; Elliott Carter: Enchanted Preludes; Elliott Carter: Esprit Rude/Esprit Doux; Elliott Carter: Canon for 4—Homage to William; Louis Andriessen: Hoketus. Dorothy Stone (piccolo, flute, bass flute, panpipes); James Rohrig (clarinet, bass clarinet, alto saxophone, baritone saxophone); Theresa Tunnicliff (clarinet); Amy Knoles (percussion); Arthur Jarvinen (percussion, chromatic harmonica, compressed-air spray cans, electric bass); Lorna Eder and Gaylord Mowrey (piano, electric piano); Robin Lorenz (violin); Erika Duke (cello, panpipes); Toby Holmes (electric bass); Rand Steiger (cond.) CD recording. New Albion NA 019 CD. San Francisco: New Albion Records, 1989.
