= Votre Faust =

Votre Faust : Fantaisie variable genre Opéra (Your Faust) is an opera (or, more precisely, a "variable fantasy in the style of an opera") in two acts by the Belgian composer Henri Pousseur, for five actors, four singers, twelve instrumentalists, and tape. The text is by the French author Michel Butor. Originally written between 1960 and 1968, it was premiered on 15 January 1969 at the Piccola Scala in Milan, and revised in 1981. Although about seven hours of performable material exists, the variable structure does not permit use of it all in a single version, and performances to date have been between three and three-and-a-half hours.

== History ==
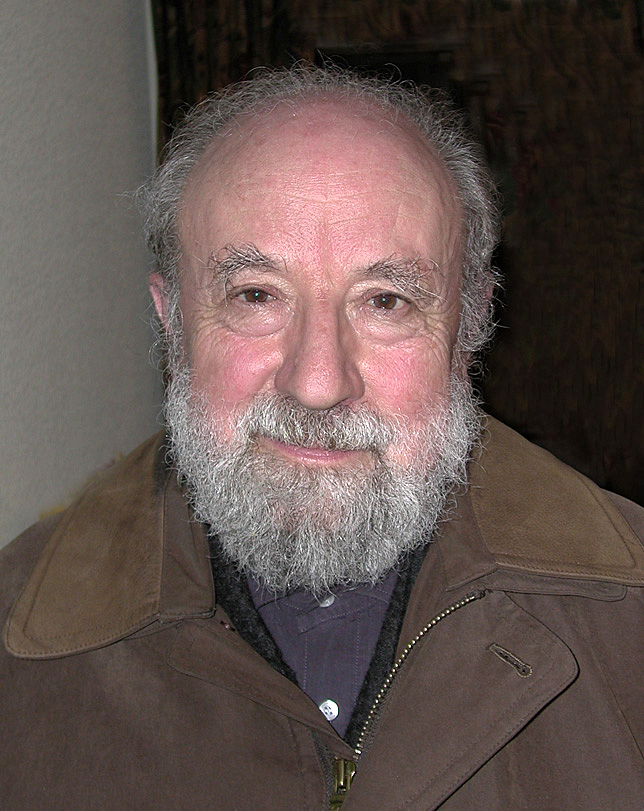
Michel Butor, librettist of Votre Faust

In 1960, the French author Michel Butor published an article with a title that may be translated as "Music, a Realist Art: Words and Music". When Pousseur read Butor's exhortation to composers to rediscover music's representational power, he felt a resonance with his own growing doubts about the Darmstadt aesthetic with which he had been associated for nearly a decade. On 29 September 1960 Pousseur wrote to Butor, asking to collaborate on a project and proposing the theme of Faust. Their first contact was some months later, when Pousseur was preparing the premiere of Répons at the Domaine musical in Paris, and in June 1961 Butor came to Belgium to plan the details of the project with Pousseur. In 1962 they published a preliminary version of the libretto. Work on the music proceeded slowly, over a period of time that included Pousseur's three-year residency at the University of Buffalo. The opera was first performed in a concert version on 17 March 1968 in Buffalo, New York, and finally staged for the first time on 15 January 1969 at the Piccola Scala in Milan, in a production that lasted nearly three and a half hours.

Shortly after the Milan performance, an hour-long documentary film was made for Belgian television, without the participation of either the stage directors or set designer of the La Scala production. This film, titled Les voyages de Votre Faust and directed by Jean Antoine, includes the closing section of the opera, with all of the possible endings shown in succession, each with a number of the preceding scenes assembled in different sequences, to illustrate the changing contexts.

Up to the end of the twentieth century, Votre Faust had been staged only twice since the Milan premiere in 1969: a production of the revised version in a German translation (billed as a "world premiere") at the Musiktheater im Revier in Gelsenkirchen on 13 March 1982, and another in Bonn in 1999. None of these stagings were completely successful. Pousseur himself described the first production as the opera's "création-naufrage" (premiere-shipwreck) and "an artistic disaster", and the second as "only an approximation". It was staged again at Radialsystem V in Berlin in March 2013, in a co-production by Work in Progress and Theater Basel, also taken to Basel in November of the same year.

== Cast ==
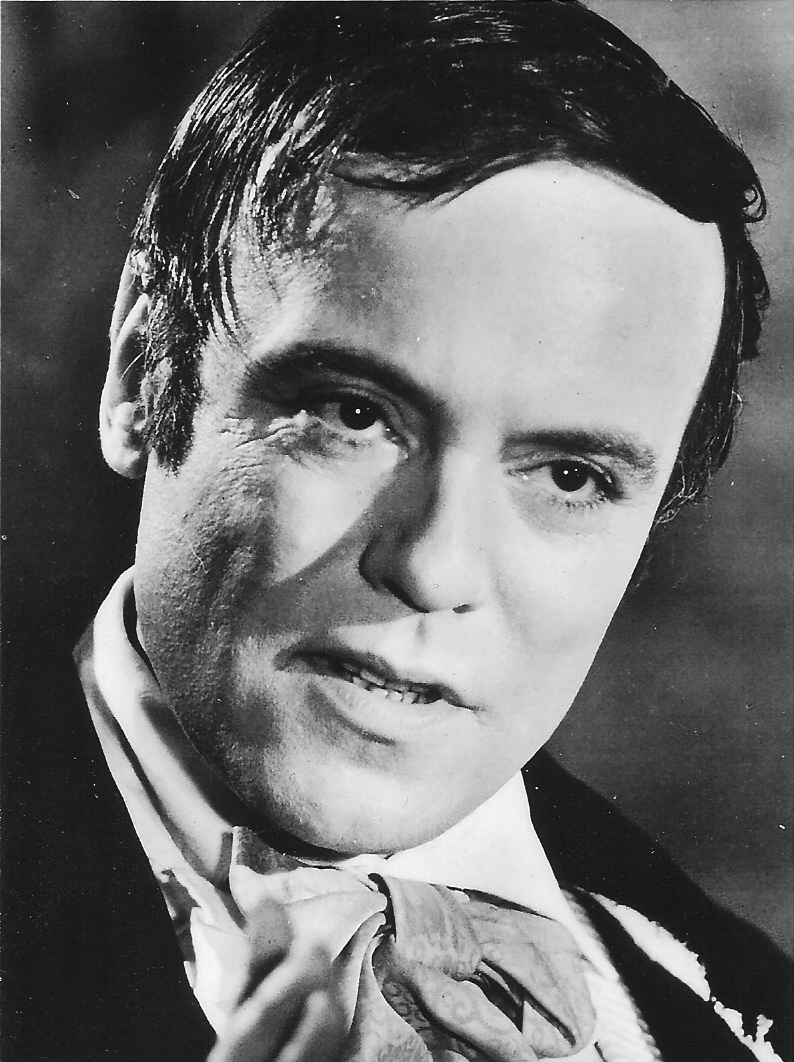
Jean Topart, who created the role of Mondor

Role(s)	Performer	Premiere cast, 15 January 1969 Conductor: Henri Pousseur
Henri [Faust]	actor	Roger Mollien
Henri [Faust]	pianist	
Henri [Faust]	soprano	Basia Retchitza
Mondor, the theatre director	actor	Jean Topart
Maggy (Henri's girlfriend)	actor	Francine Bergé
Greta (Maggy's sister)	actor	Francine Bergé
Richard (act 1, scene 1)	actor	Maurice Sarfati
The Doctor (act 2, scene D)	actor	Maurice Sarfati
Doctor Faust (act 2, scene E)	actor	[?Maurice Sarfati]
Guignol (Punch) (act 2, scene E)	actor	[?Maurice Sarfati]
Guignol's wife (Judy) (act 2, scene E)	actor	[?Françoise Brion]
[various roles]	soprano	Basia Retchitza
Pamonella (a cabaret singer)	actor	Françoise Brion
Pamonella (a cabaret singer)	alto	Merete Bækkelund
[various roles]	tenor	Louis Devos
Homeless Man (act 1, scene 3)	bass	Jules Bastin
[other roles]	bass	Jules Bastin
[various roles]	orchestra (12 instruments)	Ensemble Musiques Nouvelles (Brussels), cond. Henri Pousseur

The premiere was produced by Georgia Benamo and Roger Mollien, with sets by Martial Raysse.

Although actors perform all of the central characters, the roles may be "polyvalent": sometimes also represented by singers or instrumentalists. For example, in the opening scene of act 1, while the actor playing Henri mimes the action of "analysing" Webern's Second Cantata at the piano, an actual pianist, costumed identically, appears onstage to perform the music in parallel. In the same scene, the actor-Henri rehearses a religious work, sung onstage at the same time by the soprano singer. On the other hand, the actors may perform various different roles in the same scene, and in different capacities, while also exchanging roles with the musicians. In one of the puppet-show scenes, for example, the same part may be performed in mime, dance, and song.

== Orchestra ==
The orchestra consists of just twelve instrumentalists, who often appear onstage and interact with the actors and singers:

- Flute (doubles piccolo)
- Clarinet in B♭ (doubles clarinet in E♭)
- Alto saxophone in E♭
- Bassoon
- Horn in F
- Trumpet in C
- Percussion
- Harp
- Piano
- Violin
- Violoncello
- Contrabass

In addition to the live players, electronic music on tape is played back over loudspeakers in the hall.

== Synopsis ==
=== Prologue sur le théâtre ===
The Theatre Director, a figure from Goethe's Faust I, introduces Henri as a writer of brilliant and provocative articles, who will explain some of the perplexities of modern music to the audience. This pre-concert talk is lip-synched and mimed to a recording of excerpts from Pousseur's article "Pour une périodicité généralisée", gradually dissolving into a complaint to the audience about the unsatisfactory current state of Henri's career, in which he spends all his time talking about music instead of composing it. His complaint is accompanied by recorded fragments from Berio's Thema (Omaggio a Joyce) and Stockhausen's Gesang der Jünglinge, both electronic music compositions.

=== Prologue dans le ciel ===
An instrumental "re-overture" made from a set of "one hundred celestial notes", derived in turn from nine twelve-tone rows quoted from works by Boulez, Schoenberg, Stockhausen, Stravinsky, Webern, and Pousseur himself. The orchestra performs this music onstage, beginning in the dark but with variously coloured spotlights gradually picking out the course of the canonic musical process.

=== Act 1 ===
- Scene 1. Alone in his apartment, Henri is seated at the piano, analysing Webern's Second Cantata. He is interrupted by the Theatre Director, who has come to offer Henri a commission for a Faust opera.
- Scene 2. Having accepted the commission, Henri goes to a café by the church, where he meets Greta and Maggy. A cabaret entertainer sings the French translation of Mephistopheles's serenade, with music of the lullaby from Alban Berg's Wozzeck, distorted with jazz rhythms. In the background, the sounds of water fountains, chirping birds, and clinking glasses can be heard, together with musical quotations from Debussy.
- Scene 3. On the street outside Maggy's residence, music in the style of Varèse collides with bits from Mussorgsky's Boris Godunov, sung by a homeless man, and music by Bartók.
- Scene 4. At the urging of the Theatre Director, Henri visits the fairground at the port, where he is confronted by a cacophony of musical quotations, fragments of conversations in different languages (English, Italian, German, and French), and noises of all kinds. A series of fairground booths present different shows mixing up quotations and different historical musical styles, which are made to interact with early twentieth-century modernist idioms. The French booth, for example, mixes quotations from Gounod, Berlioz, Bizet, and Massenet into an amalgam suggesting the style of Darius Milhaud; the German booth transforms quotations from Weber, Lortzing, and Wagner into the style of Schoenberg; the Italian booth merges fragments ranging from Rossini to Puccini into a style suggesting Stravinsky; while the "English" booth actually quotes from a variety of mostly non-English church music (Handel, Gounod, Mendelssohn, Chopin, and Franck), distorting them into a neoclassical style meant to suggest Hindemith.

=== Act 2 ===
The course of act 2 is determined in part by the audience, who vote to decide things such as whether Henri should take Greta or Maggy to the fair, and whether Henri should escape the Theatre Director by taking a cruise or else stay to work on his opera. In the central fairground scene (more extended than the one in the first act), there is a puppet show with four different versions of the Faust story, each with its own particular musical colouration. Throughout this scene, the audience is repeatedly called upon to decide whether to continue with the current version, or change to one of the other. In three of the four possible endings, Henri never even begins to compose his own Faust opera. The work closes with a general finale which presents a critical interpretation of the events that took place during whichever version the audience has witnessed, and in which it has participated.

== Style and structure ==
The title Votre Faust is meant on the one hand to recall Paul Valéry's unfinished play Mon Faust, and on the other to refer to the mobile form of the work. The second-person possessive pronoun also suggests a connection to Butor's best-known novel, La modification. Butor and Pousseur call Votre Faust a "fantaisie variable genre opéra" (variable fantasy in the style of an opera), in order to emphasize its distance from operatic conventions. Although live singers are called for, the principal roles are taken by actors, instrumentalists share the stage and interact with the singers and actors, and much of the vocal material is actually prerecorded on tape. The second act has an aleatory structure, in which the audience determines the course of the action by formal ballots at some points, and by vocal interjections at others. There are about seven hours of material in the thousand pages of the score, but only a selection can occur in any one version. Because of this intentionally variable structure, duration may vary considerably from one version to another, but stagings to date have been between three and three-and-a-half hours.

The fabric of the work, both textually and musically, is made from a vast network of musical and literary quotations, alluding to many earlier Faust-themed musical and literary works, and to past musical styles extending from Monteverdi to Boulez. Together with some other composers who have sought to integrate heterogeneous material and musical languages into their work, Pousseur's methods continue to qualify as being serial. The number five governs many elements of the opera: it is the number of actors, of locations, of languages, colours of scenic lighting, and of versions to be determined by ballot of the audience. However, although there are five different epilogues, because there are actually six different possible routes to each of them there are in effect thirty different resolutions of the story. The five locations are tied to the five lighting colours, and in the first act present the five languages progressively:

1. Henri's room ("le cabinet du Docteur Faust"): lit in blue, using only French
2. The cabaret near the church: lit in green; languages: French and German
3. The street where Maggy lives, lit in yellow; languages: French, German, and English
4. The fair near the port, lit in red; languages: French, German, English, and Italian
5. The port itself, lit in violet; languages: French, German, English, Italian, and Spanish

Each of the first four locations occurs at least once in each of the possible versions of the opera. The port has the wildest atmosphere, but only appears in one possible version, as the closing scene of the most unfortunate course of action. It is for this reason that many echoes of the port (mostly boat horns) are inserted into the fair and street scenes.

In addition to the five main locations there are: the interior of a church (an infernal church whose tower is seen via projections in Henri's room and from the street, and into which one "enters" for the end of the first part), as well as various means of transport—trains, planes, boats—for the last fragment of the second part (after the fair). Here, the colour of the light announces the countries in which we are supposed to be (and therefore also determines the language of some sung parts, which are especially variable in this last fragment).

== Reception ==
Votre Faust is regarded as the summation of Pousseur's work from the 1960s.

The audiences at the premiere production in 1969 were at best bored and unengaged, and at worst exhibited sleazy and vulgar ("squallido e volgare)" behaviour, rudely expressing their displeasure by shouting "basta!" ("enough!") and throwing small change and other objects onto the stage. At one point, when the score presents a quotation from Don Giovanni, there were loud cries of "Bravo Mozart!". The fiasco was provoked in part by the "complex clauses of the electoral law devised by the authors", involving amongst other things planting actors in the stalls, who would stand up and "vote" at the appointed times (presumably to obtain the results preferred by the producers), instead of letting the genuine audience members participate. This "fraud" was particularly conspicuous because the cronies planted in the Milanese audience "interrupted in the only language they could speak—French".

Critics were more temperate, but generally agreed the production was a failure. They were most divided over Pousseur's musical collage technique. Claudio Sartori found the quotations "pointless", while the critic for La Stampa was noncommital, saying only that "Pousseur is a musician of proven dexterity, aligned with the most up-to-date ranks of the avant-garde". Peter Heyworth, on the other hand, found the "elaborate collage of citation, parody, pastiche and genuine composition" to have been "carried off with considerable panache", and admitted that Votre Faust is "utterly unlike any opera I have ever heard, and I would like to believe that it represents a major attempt to bring music and drama into a new sort of relationship" but, on the whole, found it "nothing more than a box of tricks; full of sound and signifying precious little. In the worst sense of the word, an experiment". Luciano Berio, a colleague and friend of Pousseur, was wholly enthusiastic about "a score that I love deeply for innumerable reasons", but nevertheless admitted the production was a failure—a failure which he blamed partly on Butor's text, but more emphatically on the stage design and "what is normally defined as directing but in our case is revealed as a gratuitous succession of inconsistent poses perpetrated by a pair of naïve amateurs inexplicably dragged to Milan by M. Butor". Sartori concurred, describing the production as "heavy" and the sets "ugly". In an interview conducted shortly after the Milan performances, one of the singers confirmed that stage direction was practically nonexistent, so that the performers were forced largely to improvise their movements. After protracted wrangling that began with the first rehearsals in the theatre and continued through most of the run, it was finally agreed to do the fourth and last performance in concert form. The instrumentalists were described as "bravissimi" (talented) and the singers as "strenui" (stalwart), and although Jean Topart in the role of Mondor was generally admired, the other actors' performances were scarcely mentioned. One exception was made by Berio, who paid Roger Mollien a backhanded compliment: "The 'protagonist' Henri, ... is, in the words of Butor, a perfect cretin, equaled in this respect only by 'actor-director' Mollien trying to portray the part", who in the end, according to Berio, uttered only two coherent sentences: "C'est que nous n'avons pas encore abordé la question du livret" (We have not yet addressed the issue of the libretto), and "s'il y a eu un coupable dans l'affaire, c'est moi, tu le sais bien, Maggy" (If there has been a guilty man in this case it's me, you know that, Maggy).

Pousseur published a response to Berio in which he rejected the validity of separately criticising the music and text, in part because Butor's ideas strongly influenced his musical decisions and in part because some of the musical ideas actually emanated from Butor himself. On the other hand, he admitted there had been "lack of a spirit of collaboration" with the directors of the production, generated by what he felt was "a total lack of respect" for his and Butor's work, and a "total misunderstanding" of it. Pousseur also felt they were unable to deal with the auditory aspect of the opera, due to "a total lack of effort through the entire year prior to the beginning of rehearsals", and indicted the directors' neglect of the visual aspects of the opera, manifested by choosing a production designer only at the last moment, so that he did not have the time even to read the libretto. "Michel Butor gave him a list of slides to prepare" and, though the score and libretto prescribe exactly where and how they are to be used, "this was not taken into account, the projections were used in the greatest disorder and, once more, with the greatest liberty, which took away every significant function of the temporal architecture envisaged by the authors".

Another composer-colleague, Pierre Boulez, while recognizing the validity of some of its properties, was less enthusiastic than Berio about Pousseur's score:

I am not convinced at all that these motifs, themes, or the intervallic symbology are necessarily so old-fashioned. I would rather say that we have been reducing ourselves to a far too primitive use of these conceptions. Of course the contrast between chromaticism and diatonicism does not exist any more; ... I am convinced that musical symbolism does exist, even if only, unfortunately, in a very primitive form. In my opinion most of today's theatrical solutions are just naive attempts to simplify an extremely complex problem—a problem which should not be dealt with as a game—at least not with those means—but rather as a formal problem. Take Pousseur's Votre Faust. Pousseur wanted to create a symbolic synthesis, but unfortunately he achieved it only by means of quotations: and a theatre of mere quotations reminds one of a school, where at the end of the lessons the schoolboys mimic their teachers: of course the whole class bursts into laughter, yet the connotative possibilities are obviously limited. Works based on quotations also make one think of advertisements: they may be amusing the first time one sees them, but by the second time they have lost their interest, because they are not stylistically structural, but rather without structure and all alike. I think we ought to try to find a structural correspondence between theatrical and musical semantics, so that symbology is not limited to the motifs and themes of a work, but is included in the theatrical structure itself.

From the perspective of the early twenty-first century, the collage techniques of Votre Faust—especially in conjunction with contemporaneous statements by Pousseur about the "information age" in which we live, and the general acceptance of a collective network of creation—are seen as a "prescient commentary on what we have come to call 'postmodern pastiche,' in which different historical registers and styles are mingled in a single work".

The profound ambivalence of the opera's central character, Henri (clearly representing Pousseur himself), faced with the extreme plurality of possibilities that he encounters, as well as the open-ended nature of the opera as a whole, may be a sign of Pousseur's "desire not to impose any particular solution in the search for musical alternatives to high modernism. Through Henri's uncertainty and resistance to embark on any particular aesthetic path, Pousseur suggests that his own aesthetic questioning and soul-searching remained unresolved at the time he composed Votre Faust".

== Satellite works ==
Pousseur composed a number of related works, which he referred to as "satellites", some concurrently with work on the opera and others over more than thirty years following its completion. These are:

- Miroir de Votre Faust (Caractères II) for solo piano and (optional) soprano (1964–65)
- Jeux de Miroirs de Votre Faust for piano, soprano and tape (1964–65)
- Echos de Votre Faust for mezzo-soprano, flute, cello, and piano (1961–69) [no. 7 is Echo II de Votre Faust, a contribution to A Garland for Dr. K., on the occasion of Alfred Kalmus's 80th birthday]
- Les Ruines de Jéruzona for mixed choir and "rhythm section" (1978)
- La Passion selon Guignol for amplified vocal quartet and orchestra (1981)
- Parade de Votre Faust for orchestra (1974)
- Aiguillages au carrefour des immortels for 16 or 17 instruments (2002)
- Il sogno di Leporello: Parade 2 (de Votre Faust) for orchestra (2005)

== Discography ==
- Jeux de miroirs de Votre Faust. Marcelle Mercenier, piano; Basia Retchitzka, soprano; Cathy Berberian, alto; Louis Devos, tenor; Jules Bastin, bass; Michel Butor, Francine Liebens, and Henri Pousseur, speaking voices; electronic music produced by the composers at the electronic music studios of Ghent and Brussels. Coupled with Pierre Bartholomée: Le Tombeau de Marin Marais. LP recording, 1 audio disc: analogue, stereo, 33⅓ rpm, 12 in. Wergo 60.039. Studio Reihe neuer Musik. Mainz: Wergo Schallplatten GmbH, 1969. Jeux de miroirs reissued as part of Henri Pousseur: Musique mixte 1966–1970. With Crosses of Crossed Colors. CD recording, 1 audio disc: stereo. Sub Rosa SR231. [Brussels]: Sub Rosa, 2006.
- Butor/Pousseur: Votre Faust . Jean-Yves Bosseur (Henri); Michel Butor (Mondor); Colette Bergé (Maggy); Emmanuelle Riva (Pamonella); Merete Bækkelund (alto); Jules Bastin (bass); Ensemble Musiques Nouvelles, Henri Pousseur, cond. LP recording, 3 audio discs: analogue, stereo, 33⅓ rpm, 12 in., two editions: BASF/Harmonia Mundi 01 21580-6 1–3 (with dialogue in French); 01 20358-1 1–3 (with dialogue in German). Freiburg: BASF, 1973.
- Echo II de votre Faust, for flute, cello, and piano [seventh movement of Echos de Votre Faust]. In A Garland for Dr. K.: Kompositionen zum 80. Geburtstag von Dr. Alfred A. Kalmus, with works by David Bedford, Hugh Wood, Pierre Boulez, Richard Rodney Bennett, Luciano Berio, Cristóbal Halffter, Roman Haubenstock-Ramati, Harrison Birtwistle, Karlheinz Stockhausen, and Bernard Rands. Vicente Sempere Gomis (flute); José Vadillo Vadillo, Vicente Lafuente Maurín (clarinets); Juán Luis Jordá Ayats (violin); Pablo Ceballos Gomez (viola); Angel Gonzalez Quiñones (cello); Felix Puertas Villahoz (percussion); Maria Manuela Care de Halffter, Maria Elena Barrientos (piano); Cristóbal Halffter (cond.). Recorded in the Studio Audiofilm, Madrid, 1976. LP recording, 1 audio disc: analogue, stereo, 33⅓ rpm, 12 in. Universal Edition UE 15043; Interdisc ID 104. London: Universal Edition, 1976.

== Filmography ==
- Les voyages de Votre Faust. Television documentary film (black & white, 60 minutes), directed by Jean Antoine. Brussels: RTB, 1970.
