= The Modification and Instrumentation of a Famous Hornpipe as a Merry and Altogether Sincere Homage to Uncle Alfred =

- by Luciano Berio
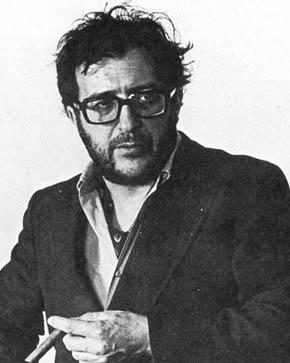
- Luciano Berio, around the time of the composition.
- Composed: 1969
- Performed: 22 April 1969: London
- Scoring: flute, clarinet in B-flat, drum, viola, violoncello, and harpsichord

The Modification and Instrumentation of a Famous Hornpipe as a Merry and Altogether Sincere Homage to Uncle Alfred, sometimes shortened to Hornpipe, is an arrangement for six players of Henry Purcell's Hornpipe, from The Fairy-Queen, by Italian composer Luciano Berio. This arrangement was composed in 1969.

== Composition ==
Luciano Berio was already known not only as an avant-garde composer, but also as an arranger, of his own music as well as of others. This composition was specifically composed for the celebration of the eightieth birthday of Alfred Kalmus, the then-director of the London branch of Universal Edition, Berio's main publishing house. This composition ended up being the fifth in a series of compositions by eleven different composers, including Pierre Boulez, Karlheinz Stockhausen and Harrison Birtwhistle. The whole series of compositions was entitled A Garland for Dr. K. The whole set of works were premiered as a group by the Pierrot Players on 22 April 1969, at the Queen Elizabeth Hall in the Southbank Centre, London. The Hornpipe was later published by Universal Edition.

== Structure ==
The composition takes only one minute to perform and is in one movement. It is scored for a small ensemble consisting of flute or oboe, clarinet in B-flat, drum, viola, violoncello, and harpsichord. The composition is an arrangement of a popular piece by Purcell, which was used by Purcell in at least two occasions: it was used as a hornpipe in the first music of The Fairy-Queen, Z 629, prior to the first act, in 1692, and in the incidental music for Rule a Wife and Have a Wife, Z 587, in a song entitled "There is not a swain", in 1693. Even though the melody is closer to the former, this piece is generally attributed to be an arrangement of the latter.

== Recordings ==
- In 1976, Cristóbal Halffter, a composer who wrote one of the pieces in the series, released a complete recording of the set to which this composition belongs. The whole set was released on vinyl by Universal Edition under the title A Garland For Dr. K.: Compositions for the 80th Birthday of Dr. Alfred A. Kalmus. The set was recorded in April 1976 in Madrid.
- Members of the Orchestra Sinfonica di Milano Giuseppe Verdi recorded the piece under the baton of Riccardo Chailly for Decca Records. It was recorded in August 2004 in the Auditorium di Milano.

== See also ==
- A Garland for Dr. K.
