= Open form (disambiguation) =

Open form is a concept in art in which the work is not self-contained, but points beyond itself.

Open form may also refer to:

- Open form music, a type of aleatoric music
- Lloyd's Open Form, a standard legal document for a proposed marine salvage operation
