= Closed form =

Closed form may refer to:

== Mathematics ==
- Closed-form expression, a finitary expression
- Closed differential form, a differential form $\alpha$ whose exterior derivative $d\alpha$ is the zero form $0$, meaning $d\alpha = 0$.

== Poetry ==
- In poetry analysis, a type of poetry that exhibits regular structure, such as meter or a rhyming pattern
- Trobar clus, an allusive and obscure style adopted by some 12th-century troubadours
