= Duncan Druce =

English composer, string player and musicologist (1939–2015)

Robert Duncan Druce (23 May 1939 – 13 October 2015) was an English composer, string player and musicologist, noted for his interest in early to contemporary music, as well as the music of India.

== Education and academic life ==
Druce was born in Cheshire in 1939, the son of Robert Druce, a bacteriologist, and Katy Chesters. In 1957, he entered King's College, Cambridge, which later awarded him a double first in music. Subsequently, he completed a Masters at the University of Leeds and, in 1984 embarked upon a second master's degree, at the University of York, choosing the music of southern India as the topic of his thesis. In 1991, Druce stood down from his long-standing post as senior lecturer at Leeds University's Bretton Hall Campus, to continue to work as a performer and composer. Druce lectured in composition part-time at the University of Huddersfield until his death.

Druce married Clare Spalding in 1964. The couple had two daughters, Alison and Emily. His wife, daughters, four grandchildren, a great-grandson, and his sister Cathy survived him at the time of his death.

== Performing career ==
When working as a music producer for the BBC in the late 1960s, Duncan Druce became a notable, in-demand violin and viola player of contemporary music. He was an original member of Harrison Birtwistle's Pierrot Players, noted for his rendition of the violin/viola part in Schoenberg's Pierrot Lunaire. Druce also performed with the ensembles Music Theatre Ensemble and the Fires of London during this period.

Contrastingly, Druce was also one of the most respected figures in the performance of early music. One of the few living British champions of the viola d'amore, he was a member of Christopher Hogwood's Academy of Ancient Music, was an original member of the Yorkshire Baroque Soloists and continued to play with groups such as the Pennine Chamber Ensemble. Druce continued to perform regularly, either on one of his baroque violins, violas or his viola d'amore in recitals across the country until his death.

== Compositions ==
- Sonata for violin and piano (1965)
- Piano Trio (16’) (1967)
- Jugalbundi, for clarinet and viola (1968)
- Hora Rumana, for violin and piano (5’) (1969)
- String Quartet No 1 (22’) (1969)
- The Tower of Needles, for soprano, violin/viola, cello, clarinet, flute/picc., piano, perc. (28’) (1970–1971)
- Whose doing is it? (Tolstoy), for narrator, string orchestra, percussion (14’) (1971)
- A Red King's Crown, for piano (16’) (1971)
- Chiasmata, for two violas (12’) (1972)
- Images from Nature, for voice, flute, cello, piano (11’) (1973)
- Fantasy and Divisions, for orchestra (2121 1110 perc. strings), on a theme of J. H. Schmelzer (25’) (1974)
- Märchenzeit, for flute, clarinet, violin, cello, glockenspiel, piano (1’30") (1974)
- Solo for Emily, for viola d’amore (7’) (1975)
- The Creator's Shadow, for flute, basset-clarinet, viola, cello, guitar, perc., piano (22’) (1975)
- Udana, for recorder and harpsichord (1976)
- Concert piece, for bass clarinet and piano (1977)
- The Floor of Heaven, for basset-clarinet and fortepiano, or clarinet and piano (20’) (1978–1979)
- Campanella Madrigals, for soprano, mixed chorus, wind ensemble (1222 2230) and double bass (33’) (1979)
- Hoxton Variations, for violin and guitar (1980)
- Lacerta Agilis, for flute and piano (5’) (1981, published by Forsyth)
- Prelude, for piano, clarinet, violin, cello (7’) (1981–1982)
- Two Night-pieces, for bassoon solo, and for three bassoons (1982, published by Forsyth)
- String Quartet No 2 (24’) (1982)
- Before Dawn on Thursday, for solo recorder (6’) (1984, published by Forsyth)
- The Last Post, for viola d’amore and live electronics (1984)
- Concerto Popolare, for violin and string orchestra (finale arranged from Hora Rumana) (22’) (1986)
- Venkatamakhi's Dream, for clarinet and string quartet (26’) (1988)
- "We were like them that dream", for mixed chorus (18’) (1990–1991)
- String Quintet (2 vln., 2 vla., cello) (28’) (1991)
- Fives, Sixes and Sevens: Rhapsody for violin and piano (7’)
- Snowstorms on a Postcard, for (youth) orchestra (3242 4331 3 perc. timp. strings) (12’) (1993)
- Earth, Sun, Moon, for mixed chorus and renaissance wind instruments (shawms, cornetti, recorders, trombones – *or modern equivalents) (10’) (1995)
- String Quartet No 3 – Homage to Smetana (22’) (1996–1997)
- The Garden of Cyrus, fantasia for five viols (12’) (2000)
- Scanned across the dark space, for orchestra (3232 4331 perc., timp., harp, strings) (9’) (2000)
- The Selfish Giant – musical show for children. Text, after Oscar Wilde, Clare Druce (2001)
- Three Settings of Ave Maria, for two violins and cello (6’) (2001)
- Rainbow Stories – musical show for children. Text, Clare Druce (2002)
- String Quartet No 4 (12’) 2004–2005

== Musical reconstruction ==
Apart from his work as a performer, composer, and academic, Druce reconstructed many incomplete and lost pieces of music. In 1984, Druce finished a new completion of Mozart's Requiem, which was performed at The Proms in 1991. This completion (which is published by Novello and includes a new edition of the original and most famous Süssmayr completion) is still widely performed today. In his preface to the score, Druce explains:

'Whilst the work as a whole has proved to be one of Mozart's best loved and most admired, it has been clear ever since [Süssmayr's completion] was first published that it sometimes lacks the perfection of detail, smooth craftmanship, the imaginative relationship of subsidiary material to the whole that is so characteristic of Mozart's other mature masterpieces. Süssmayr's orchestration [...] may not often get in the way of Mozart's vision, but rarely enhances it.'

Other Mozart works which Druce completed include Quintet Movement for clarinet and strings K.516c (commissioned by Alan Hacker), a quintet in F for clarinet, basset horn, violin, viola and violoncello K. Anh. 90 (580b), and Concerto movement for horn and orchestra in E, K.494a. Druce also provided a 66-bars ending to a Symphony movement in A by Franz Berwald and a completion to Artaxerxes by Arne.
