= Scambi =

1957 composition by Henri Pousseur

- by Henri Pousseur
- English: Exchanges
- Genre: Electronic music
- Composed: 1957
- Performed: Incontri Musicali, Milan. May, 1957.
- Published: Suvini Zerboni (ESZ)
- Scoring: open

Scambi (Exchanges) is an aleatoric electronic composition by the Belgian composer Henri Pousseur, realized in 1957 at the Studio di fonologia musicale di Radio Milano.

== History ==
Pousseur's first electronic work was Seismogramme I–II. It was performed in October 1954 on the first concert of full-scale compositions produced at the Westdeutscher Rundfunk's Studio for Electronic Music in Cologne. Pousseur had obligations as a schoolteacher in his hometown of Malmedy, Belgium, and could only work intermittently in the Cologne studio. His friend Karlheinz Stockhausen helped carry out the technical realization. On his second electronic composition (Scambi), Pousseur was able to work directly on realizing the music.

At the 1956 Darmstädter Ferienkurse, Pousseur met Luciano Berio, who invited him to work at the Studio di fonologia musicale di Radio Milano. On the train to Milan in the spring of 1957, Pousseur formulated two goals for his new work. First, he wanted to design the work in a way that permitted the listener to participate in its temporal formation, which meant it would be composed of a number of small elements which could be arranged in different ways. Second, it seemed necessary at that time to use material that avoided the periodic character of traditional music, including the internal structure of the sounds themselves. For Pousseur, this meant filtering noise to produce a range of sounds with different degrees of relative pitch.

Well after Pousseur finished the piece, he published the essay "Scambi - description of a work in progress" (1959). He explained his process in depth as well as the concepts behind them. Specifically, he points to an essay by Wladimir Weidlé which states, "La régularité irrégulière...doit être considérée comme une loi universelle des Formes vivantes" (Irregular regularity...must be considered as a universal law of Living Forms). Pousseur's ideas built on the post-Webernian goal of exploring nontraditional structures; in place of the concepts of polarity and causality in traditional musical thinking, Anton Webern felt that "Es soll alles schweben" (everything should remain in suspension).

== Composition ==
Pousseur only had six weeks to work in Milan; consequently, it was necessary to find relatively quick methods for the generation and formation of the material. This was an important factor in deciding on techniques that deviated from the microstructural devices accepted almost exclusively in electronic composition until the present time.

At the Studio di fonologia, Pousseur discovered a special filter designed by Alfredo Lietti, the technical director of the studio. By changing the threshold voltage, Pousseur could focus white noise into more musical sounds with narrower bandwidths. Studio technician Marino Zuccheri assisted Pousseur in compiling a supply of suitable sounds for his composition.

Pousseur and Zuccheri created thirty-two loops of filtered white noise, each lasting either thirty or forty-two seconds. To perform Scambi, a performer simply had to construct a version of the piece using the thirty-two loops according to rules devised by the composer. He titled the work after the Italian word "scambio" for "connection"; "scambi" is the plural form, and Pousseur's overarching concern in the piece was that the sequences be connected organically.

== Analysis ==
The starting-point for Scambi is a collection of sound material that is globally statistical. By means of devices that enable transformation techniques, elements are selected from electronically generated white noise. Various frequency bands were isolated, each with a bandwidth of half an octave, and from each of these a sequence is filtered using an amplitude selector. The output is randomly determined by whichever sounds happen to emerge above the filter's threshold. These sequences, which already fluctuate in frequency around average values, are then made to centre on nine different pitch levels. On each one, a directed motion of change in density is imposed in which the direction is not linear, but rather travels in a spiral fashion. An acceleration machine is then used to give each sequence a rising or falling pitch tendency, within which the motion is not even, but is disturbed by small internal deviations in contrary directions. This material is then reduced to four basic structural types, each characterised by movement from either high to low or low to high, and from either fast to slow or slow to fast.

Rhythms are intentionally irregular and unpredictable. Details of the music are therefore "imprecise". On the whole, only general motions are heard—general speeds or changes of speeds—with abrupt breaks occurring even within these tendencies.

A second structural level opposes this essentially discontinuous material with contrasting, long-sustained, continuous sounds, again in four types of shape. These two four-fold classes of structures are blended in various degrees to produce sixteen intermodulated structural types. Together with their retrogrades, a total of thirty-two sequences are generated: high-fast-discontinuous changing to high-slow-continuous, low-slow-discontinuous changing to low-fast-continuous, high -fast discontinuous changing to high-slow-discontinuous, and so on.

Once having produced these thirty-two sequences, Pousseur regarded the work as complete, though with an enormous number of possible realisations—an aleatory principle which had been intended from the outset. Scambi is unusual for an electronic work in having a mobile structure. It consists of sixteen pairs of segments (called "layers" by Pousseur) that may be assembled in many different ways. Pousseur's original idea was to supply these layers on separate reels of tape, so that the listener could assemble his own version. When first created, several different versions were realized: two by Berio, one by Marc Wilkinson, and two by Pousseur himself—a longer one of about six-and-a-half minutes and a shorter one lasting just over four minutes. One of Berio's versions is shorter still at 3:25.

Pousseur established two principles for linking the segments together. The first is that there should be as complete a conformity in character as possible between the end of one segment and the beginning of the next, with the objective of accomplishing transitions as imperceptibly as possible. The second is that the formal course should be marked by the successive dominance of the different characters. The process of assembly was complicated by the fact that the sequences were not all the same length, but it was not required that all thirty-two segments necessarily appear in all versions. Though Pousseur followed these rules himself, he regarded them only as suggestions, and Berio and Wilkinson did not conform to them when making their versions. Berio's structures, for example, are marked by an even distribution of the various characters, while Wilkinson's connections emphasize effects of contrast.

== Reception ==
Initially, Scambi was not met with universal acclaim, even within Pousseur's immediate Darmstadt School circle. Pierre Boulez attended a concert of electronic music from the Milan studio given at Darmstadt on 26 July 1957, in which two versions of Scambi were presented, along with Berio's Mutazione and Perspectives and Bruno Maderna's Notturno. In a letter to Stockhausen, Boulez reported:

I also heard the electronic pieces from Milan. What a catastrophe. The one by Pousseur is absolutely zero, both in the choice of material and in its compositional structure. And then, the white noise at a high level and with glissandos, which might be used for sound effects of storms... and these sorts of vaguely aquatic gurglings, and worse (just like a toilet), I find it abominable!

Writer Umberto Eco, on the other hand, cited Scambi, together with Stockhausen's Klavierstück XI, Berio's Sequenza I, and Boulez's Third Piano Sonata, as musical exemplars of the "open work", alongside the literary models of Paul Verlaine's Art Poétique, Franz Kafka's The Trial and The Castle, and James Joyce's Ulysses and Finnegans Wake. For Eco, Scambi represents a "fresh advance" by pointing within the category of "open" works to a narrower category of "works in movement" consisting of "unplanned or physically incomplete structural units", related to Alexander Calder's mobiles or Stéphane Mallarmé's Livre. It is evident from the vocabulary used by Eco that it is Pousseur's work that had the greatest impact on his thinking. Scambi was the first open-form work of electronic music—a mobile of electronic sounds.

== Legacy ==
Beginning in 2004, the Scambi Project, directed by John Dack at the Lansdown Centre for Electronic Arts at Middlesex University in London, has focused on this work and its multiple possibilities for realization.

== Discography ==
- Panorama des musiques expérimentales. Works by Luciano Berio, Bruno Maderna, Iannis Xenakis, Jean Baronnet, François Dufrêne, Herbert Eimert, Pierre Henry, György Ligeti, Luc Ferrari, Mauricio Kagel, André Boucourechliev, and Henri Pousseur. LP recording, 2 discs: 33⅓ rpm, stereo, 12 in. Philips A 00565 L and A 00566 L. Amsterdam, Philips, 1966. Reissued as Panorama of Experimental Music. Mercury SR-2-9123 (set); SR 90478—SR 90479; [United States]: Mercury, 1968. [Pousseur's long version (6:22) of Scambi]. Second disc (including Scambi) reissued separately as Panorama electronique / Electronic Experimental Music. LP recording 1 sound disc: analog, 33⅓ rpm, stereo, 12 in. Limelight LS-86048. [S.l.]: Limelight, n.d.
- Acousmatrix—History of Electronic Music 4: Henri Pousseur: Scambi [Pousseur's long version (6:27)]; Trois visages de Liège; Paraboles-mix. CD recording, 1 sound disc: digital, 4¾ in. BV Haast Records CD 9010. Also issued as part of the 9-CD boxed set, Acousmatrix: The History of Electronic Music. BV Haast 0206. Amsterdam: BV Haast Records, 1996. Reissued 2006. Same version of Scambi reissued with other material on An Anthology of Noise and Electronic Music. Volume #1. With music by Luigi Russolo; Tony Conrad; John Cale; Otomo Yoshihide; Martin Tétreault; Antonio Russolo; Walter Ruttmann; Pierre Schaeffer; Gordon Mumma; Angus MacLise; Philip Jeck; Konrad Boehmer; Nam June Paik; John Cage; Edgard Varèse; Iannis Xenakis; Paul D. Miller; Pauline Oliveros; Ryoji Ikeda. CD recording, 2 sound discs: digital; 4 3/4 in. Sub Rosa SR190; Sub Rosa EFA 27682-2. Brussels: Sub Rosa, 2002.
- Forbidden Planets: Music from the Pioneers of Electronic Sound. [Unknown version of Scambi, probably the same as on Acousmatrix 4]. With music by Robert Beyer, Bebe and Louis Barron, Miklós Rózsa, Pierre Schaeffer, Bernard Herrmann, Herbert Eimert, John Cage, Karlheinz Stockhausen, Paul Gredinger, Hermann Heiss, Iannis Xenakis, Dick Raaijmakers, Tom Dissevelt, Edgard Varèse, György Ligeti, and Henk Badings. CD recording, 2 sound discs: digital, 4¾ in. Chrome Dreams CDCD5033. New Malden, Surrey, UK, 2009.
