= Stephen Pruslin =

American pianist and librettist (1940–2022)

Stephen Lawrence Pruslin (16 April 1940 – 25 September 2022) was an American pianist and librettist who relocated to London in the 1970s to work with Peter Maxwell Davies and Harrison Birtwistle.

== Early life and career ==
Born in New York, Pruslin was already playing the piano when 3 or 4 years old. Pruslin studied at Brandeis University in Waltham, Massachusetts and (from 1961) at Princeton University, graduating in 1963. He studied composition with Roger Sessions and his piano teachers were Luise Vosgerchian and Eduard Steuermann (the Schoenberg pupil who played in the first performance of Pierrot Lunaire). A scholarship from the University of California two years later enabled him to relocate to London, where in 1965 he became a founding member of the contemporary music ensemble the Pierrot Players (later renamed the Fires of London) along with Maxwell Davies, Birtwistle and Alan Hacker. He also sometimes played with the Melos Ensemble.

His debut solo recital took place in 1970 and he toured widely as a soloist. Whilst still a Graduate student, Pruslin had performed live recitals in New York City, and elsewhere in the USA, with the American soprano Bethany Beardslee. In the UK he had performed with violinist Emanuel Hurwitz.

== Collaboration and composition ==
Pruslin wrote the libretto for Harrison Birtwistle's chamber opera Punch and Judy (1968), and for Martin Butler's "operatic adventure story" Craig's Progress, premiered by Mecklenburgh Opera in June 1994 and adapted for radio broadcast by BBC Radio 3 the following year. He was the author of a short study of Maxwell Davies.

Other composers championed by Pruslin included Elliott Carter (especially Night Fantasies, 1980), and Henze. Maxwell Davies wrote his Piano Sonata for Pruslin in 1981, and he subsequently recorded it, alongside piano works by Alexander Goehr. He gave the first performance of Piano Polyptich by Philip Grange on 26 June 1993 at the Aldeburgh Festival.

His other recordings include performances of contemporary British clarinet music with Roger Heaton, and chamber music by Birtwistle, Davies and Goehr with Heaton and the Kreutzer String Quartet.

As a composer Pruslin wrote scores for theatre, film and television, including some arrangements for Derek Jarman's The Tempest (1979) and the musical sequences for Peter Ustinov's play Beethoven's Tenth (1983), which was produced on Broadway and in London.

Milein Cosman drew portraits of him in 1981. In 1989 Pruslin appeared in an episode of the ITV television drama series Agatha Christie's Poirot as a pianist.

== Death ==
He died on 25 September 2022, at the age of 82, survived by his partner of 37 years, the violinist Charles Renwick.
