= Poetry analysis =

Process of investigating the form of a poem in an informed way

Poetry analysis is the process of investigating the form of a poem, content, structural semiotics, and history in an informed way, with the aim of heightening one's own and others' understanding and appreciation of the work.

The words poem and poetry derive from the Greek poiēma (to make) and poieo (to create). One might think of a poem as, in the words of William Carlos Williams, a "machine made of words." A reader analyzing a poem is akin to a mechanic taking apart a machine in order to figure out how it works.

There are many different reasons to analyze poetry. A teacher might analyze a poem in order to gain a more conscious understanding of how the poem achieves its effects, in order to communicate this to their students. A writer learning the craft of poetry might use the tools of poetry analysis to expand and strengthen their own mastery. A reader might use the tools and techniques of poetry analysis in order to discern all that the work has to offer, and thereby gain a fuller, more rewarding appreciation of the poem. Finally, the full context of the poem might be analyzed in order to shed further light on the text, looking at such aspects as the author's biography and declared intentions, as well as the historical and geographical contexts of the text (though Formalism would deny any significant analytical value for context).

== Overview ==
=== Meter and Rhyme ===
One can derive pleasure from two of the most fundamental tools in the poet's toolbox—meter and rhyme—without necessarily knowing a lot of terminology. Consider, for example, the first stanza of Byron's "The Destruction of Sennacherib":

The Assyrian came down like the wolf on the fold,
And his cohorts were gleaming in purple and gold;
And the sheen of their spears was like stars on the sea,
When the blue wave rolls nightly on deep Galilee.

Byron's use of meter and rhyme is especially evident and rewarding when one reads the lines out loud. The lines have a powerful, rolling, and very evident rhythm, and they rhyme in a way that is impossible to ignore. In other words, the physicality of the language—how it sounds and feels—accounts for a large measure of the poem's effect. The poem does not have a deep, hidden, symbolic meaning. Rather, it is simply pleasurable to read, say, and hear.

Critical terminology becomes useful when one attempts to account for why the language is pleasurable, and how Byron achieved this effect. The lines are not simply rhythmic: the rhythm is regular within a line, and is the same for each line. A poem having a regular rhythm (not all poems do) is said to follow a certain meter. In "The Destruction of Sennacherib," each line has the basic pattern of two unstressed syllables followed by a third stressed syllable, with this basic pattern being repeated four times in a line. Those basic patterns are called feet, and this particular pattern (weak weak STRONG) is called an anapest. A line with four feet is said to be in tetrameter (tetra-, from the Greek for four). Therefore, this poem is written in anapestic tetrameter. (This process of analyzing a poem's rhythms is called scansion.) The poem also rhymes (not all poems do), and the rhymes follow a pattern (they do not have to). In this case, the rhymes come right next to each other, which emphasizes them, and therefore emphasizes the sound, the physical nature, of the language. The effect of the poem's language derives in part from Byron's choice of an appropriate pattern of rhyme (or rhyme scheme): these adjacent, rhyming lines are called couplets. The sound, the physical nature, of the language is also emphasized by alliteration, as in the repetition of s sounds in the third line: "And the sheen of their spears was like stars on the sea".

== Tools ==
=== Poetic forms ===
Poems can have many forms. Some forms are strictly defined, with required line counts and rhyming patterns, such as the sonnet (mostly made of a 14-line poem with a defined rhyme scheme) or limerick (usually a 5-line free rhyme poem with an AABBA rhyme scheme). Such poems exhibit closed form, meaning they have strict rules regarding their structure and length. Others (which exhibit open form) have less structure or, indeed, almost no apparent structure at all. This appearance, though, is deceptive: successful open form poems are informed throughout by organic structure which may resist formal description but is nonetheless a crucial element of the poem's effect on the reading mind.

==== Closed forms ====
A poet writing in closed form follows a specific pattern, a specific design. Some designs have proven so durable and so suited to the English language that they survive for centuries and are renewed with each generation of poets (sonnets, sestinas, limericks, and so forth), while others come into being for the expression of one poem and are then set aside (Frost's "Stopping by Woods on a Snowy Evening" is a good example).

Of all closed forms in English prosody, none has demonstrated greater durability and range of expression than blank verse, which is verse that follows a regular meter but does not rhyme. In English, iambic pentameter is by far the most frequently employed meter. Among the many exemplary works of blank verse in English are Milton's Paradise Lost and most of the verse passages from Shakespeare's plays, such as this portion of a famous soliloquy from Hamlet:

To be, or not to be—that is the question.
Whether 'tis nobler in the mind to suffer
The slings and arrows of outrageous fortune,
Or to take arms against a sea of troubles
And by opposing end them. To die, to sleep —
No more, and by a sleep to say we end
The heartache and the thousand natural shocks
That flesh is heir to. 'Tis a consummation
Devoutly to be wished. To die, to sleep,
To sleep—perchance to dream. Aye, there's the rub.

Note that Shakespeare does not rigidly follow a pattern of five iambs per line. Rather, most lines have five strong syllables, and most are preceded by a weak syllable. The meter provides a rhythm that informs the line: it is not an invariable formula.

Rhymed pairs of iambic pentameter lines form the heroic couplet. Two masters of the form are Alexander Pope and John Dryden. The form has proven especially suited to conveying wit and sardonic humor, as in the opening of Pope's An Essay on Criticism.

’Tis hard to say, if greater want of skill
Appear in writing or in judging ill;
But, of the two, less dang’rous is th’ offence,
To tire our patience, than mislead our sense.
Some few in that, but numbers err in this,
Ten censure wrong for one who writes amiss;
A fool might once himself alone expose,
Now one in verse makes many more in prose.

Fourteen lines of iambic pentameter arranged in a more elaborate rhyme scheme form a sonnet. There are two major variants. The form originated in Italy, and the word derives from "sonetto", which is Italian for "little song". The Italian sonnet or Petrarchan sonnet follows a rhyme scheme of ABBA ABBA CDE CDE, ABBA ABBA CD CD CD, ABBA ABBA CCE DDE, or ABBA ABBA CDD CEE. In each of these, a group of eight lines (the octave) is followed by a group of six (the sextet). Typically, the octave introduces a situation, idea, or problem to which the sestet provides a response or resolution. For example, consider Henry Wadsworth Longfellow's "The Sound of the Sea":

The sea awoke at midnight from its sleep,
And round the pebbly beaches far and wide
I heard the first wave of the rising tide
Rush onward with uninterrupted sweep;
A voice out of the silence of the deep,
A sound mysteriously multiplied
As of a cataract from the mountain's side,
Or roar of winds upon a wooded steep.
So comes to us at times, from the unknown
And inaccessible solitudes of being,
The rushing of the sea-tides of the soul;
And inspirations, that we deem our own,
Are some divine foreshadowing and foreseeing
Of things beyond our reason or control.

The octave presents the speaker's experience of the sound of the sea, coming to him from some distance. In the sestet, this experience mutates into a meditation on the nature of inspiration and man's connection to creation and his experience of the numinous.

English has (proportionally) far fewer rhyming words than Italian. Recognizing this, Shakespeare adapted the sonnet form to English by creating an alternate rhyme scheme: ABAB CDCD EFEF GG. The poet using this, the English sonnet or Shakespearean sonnet form, may use the fourteen lines as single unit of thought (as in "The Silken Tent" above), or treat the groups of four rhyming lines (the quatrains) as organizational units, as in Shakespeare's Sonnet 73:

That time of year thou mayst in me behold
When yellow leaves, or none, or few do hang
Upon those boughs which shake against the cold
Bare ruined choirs where late the sweet birds sang.
In me thou seest the twilight of such day
As after sunset fadeth in the west,
Which by and by black night doth steal away,
Death's second self, which seals up all in rest.
In me thou seest the glowing of such fire
That on the ashes of his youth doth lie,
As the deathbed whereon it must expire,
Consumed with that which it was nourished by.
This thou perceiv'st, which makes thy love more strong,
To love that well which thou must leave ere long.

In lines 1–4, the speaker compares his time of life to autumn. In lines 5–8, the comparison is to twilight; in lines 9–12, the comparison is to the last moments of a dying fire. Each quatrain presents a shorter unit of time, creating a sense of time accelerating toward an inevitable end, the death implied in the final couplet.

At the "high end" of closed forms are the sestina and villanelle. At the "low end" are forms such as the limerick, which follows a metrical pattern of two lines of anapestic trimeter (three anapests per line), followed by two lines of anapestic dimeter (two anapests per line), followed by one line of anapestic trimeter. (The beginning of the metrical foot does not have to coincide with the beginning of the line.) Any poem following this metrical pattern would generally be considered a limerick, however most also follow an AABBA rhyme scheme. Most limericks are humorous, and many are ribald, or outright obscene (possible rhymes that could follow an opening like "There once was a man from Nantucket" are left as an exercise for the reader). Nonetheless, the form is capable of sophisticated and playful expression:

Titian was mixing rose madder.
His model posed nude on a ladder.

Her position to Titian
Suggested coition

So he nipped up the ladder and had her.

==== Open forms ====
In contrast, a poet using free verse (sometimes called "open form") seeks to find fresh and uniquely appropriate forms for each poem, letting the structure grow out of the poem's subject matter or inspiration. A common perception is that open form is easier and less rigorous than closed form (Frost likened it to "playing tennis with the net down", but such is not necessarily the case (skeptics should try playing tennis without a net): success with the open form requires great sensitivity to language and a particular type of adaptable understanding. In the best open form poems, the poet achieves something that is inaccessible through closed form. As X. J. Kennedy has said, "Should the poet succeed, then the discovered arrangement will seem exactly right for what the poem is saying" (582). The metre of ‘classical’ poetry is replaced in open verse by cadence in rhythm, line indentation, with pauses implied by the syntax, thus the limiting factor of one human breath was naturally incorporated in the poetry, essential to an oral art form, composed to be read aloud.

Walt Whitman was an important innovator of open form, and he demonstrates its merits in "A Noiseless Patient Spider."

A noiseless patient spider,
I marked where on a little promontory it stood isolated,
Marked how to explore the vacant vast surrounding,
It launched forth filament, filament, filament, out of itself,
Ever unreeling them, ever tirelessly speeding them.

And you O my soul where you stand,
Surrounded, detached, in measureless oceans of space,
Ceaselessly musing, venturing, throwing, seeking the spheres to connect them,
Till the bridge you will need to be formed, till the ductile anchor hold,
Till the gossamer thread you fling catch somewhere, O my soul.

The long, rolling lines—unified, held together like strong cords, by alliteration and assonance—partake of the same nature as the spider's filaments and the soul's threads. Two balanced stanzas, one describing a spider, the other the speaker's soul, perfectly frame the implicit comparison, with neither being privileged over the other. Just as the spider and the soul quest outward for significance, the two stanzas throw links to each other with subtly paired words: isolated/detached, launched/fling, tirelessly/ceaselessly, surrounding/surrounded.

In this poem, Whitman uses synonyms and antonyms to give structural integrity to a poem comprising two yoked stanzas, much like (but not exactly like) the way poets working within closed forms use meter and rhyme to give structural integrity to their poems. The poem has form, but the form was not imposed by previous conventions. It has open form.

=== Imagery and symbolism ===
Most poetry can be read on several levels. The surface is not necessarily the essence of the poem although in some cases (notably, the works of William McGonagall) there is little beyond the immediate. Allegory, connotation and metaphor are some of the subtler ways in which a poet communicates with the reader.

Before getting seduced into explorations of subtle nuance, however, the reader should establish the theme of the poem. What is the 'story' that is being told? Not the literal story but the heart of the poem. For example: "Another" tells of a buried child; "The Destruction of Sennacherib" tells of the annihilation of an Assyrian army by divine intervention; "The Silken Tent" compares a woman to a tent. Part of this involves recognising the voice of the poem (who is speaking), and the rest of Kipling's "six honest serving men": the events in the poem; when these occur; where is the 'speaker' and where do the events occur; why does the speaker speak? William Harmon has suggested that starting an analysis with: "This poem dramatizes the conflict between ..." is a key technique.

George Herbert in his poem Jordan (I) asks if poetry must be about the imaginary. The poem opens:

Who sayes that fictions onely and false hair
Become a verse? Is there in truth no beautie?
Is all good structure in a winding stair?
May no lines passe, except they do their dutie
Not to a true, but painted chair?

He was railing against the prevalent enthusiasm for pastoral poetry above all other forms (as becomes apparent in subsequent verses). Curiously, this verse uses metaphors to challenge the use of indirect approaches to their subject. False hair and a painted chair are decorations of the mundane. The winding stair is obstructive concealment of meaning. Herbert is criticising the overuse of allegory, symbolism or elaborate language.

For most poets—even the plain-speaking Herbert—metaphor is the fundamental means of communicating complexity succinctly. Some metaphors become so widely used that they are widely recognised symbols and these can be identified by using a specialist dictionary.

Allegorical verse uses an extended metaphor to provide the framework for the whole work. It was particularly prevalent in seventeenth century English but a more recent example is Charles Williams' The Masque of the Manuscript, in which the process of publishing is a metaphor for the search for truth. Allegories are usually readily apparent because of the heavy use of metaphor within them.

The symbolism used in a poem may not always be as overt as metaphor. Often the poet communicates emotionally by selecting words with particular connotations. For example, the word "sheen" in The Destruction of Sennacherib has stronger connotations of polishing, of human industry, than does the similar "shine". The Assyrians did not simply choose shiny metal; they worked to make it so. The word hints at a military machine.

Other tropes that may be used to increase the level of allusion include irony, litotes, simile, and metonymy (particularly synecdoche).

=== Meter and rhythm ===
English language poetic meter depends on stress, rather than the number of syllables. It thus stands in contrast to poetry in other languages, such as French, where syllabic stress is not present or recognized and syllable count is paramount. This often makes scansion (the analysis of metrical patterns) seem unduly arcane and arbitrary to English students of the craft.

In the final analysis, the terms of scansion are blunt instruments, clumsy ways of describing the infinitely nuanced rhythms of language. Nonetheless, they provide a tool for discerning and describing the underlying structure of poems (especially those employing closed form).

The terms fall into two groups: the names of the different feet, and the names of the varying line lengths.

The most common feet in poetry written in English are the iamb (weak STRONG), the anapest (weak weak STRONG), the trochee (STRONG weak), and the dactyl (STRONG weak weak). The iamb and anapest are known as rising meters (they move "up" from weak to strong syllables); the trochee and dactyl are falling meters (they move "down" from strong to weak). Less common, but frequently important for the variety and energy they bring to a line, are the monosyllabic foot (weak) and the spondee (STRONG STRONG).

The terms for line length follow a regular pattern: a Greek prefix denoting the number of feet and the root "meter" (for "measure"): monometer, dimeter, trimeter, tetrameter, pentameter, hexameter, heptameter, and octameter (lines having more than eight feet are possible but quite rare).

Another useful term is caesura, for a natural pause within a line.

Meter and line length are not formulas for successful lines of poetry. They are rough forms of notation for the many satisfying and variable rhythms of language. Slavish adherence to meter produces doggerel. Skillful poets structure their poems around a meter and line length, and then depart from it and play against it as needed in order to create effect, as Robert Browning does in the first line of "My Last Duchess":

That's my last Duchess painted on the wall.

The opening spondees, which throw the iambic line out of pattern, gives the Duke's words a certain virulent energy: he's spitting the words out.

Gerard Manley Hopkins took this idea of poetric energy through departure from meter to its extreme, with his theory and practice of sprung rhythm, an approach to poetry in which the language constantly frustrates the reading mind's expectation of a regular meter.

=== Sound, tone, diction, and connotation ===
Analyzing diction and connotation—the meanings of words as well as the feelings and associations they carry—is a good place to start for any poem. The use of specific words in the poem serve to create a tone—an attitude taken towards the subject. For example, consider the words "slither" and "sneak." When used in a poem, the words conjure up images of a snake. The sibilant s sound reinforces the image. The connotations of the words suggest something surreptitious and undercover. From the tone, one can infer that the author is suspicious or fearful of the subject.

A detached tone, or an opposite tone than the reader would expect, are sometimes purposely employed to elicit more of a response. In the opening lines of "The Love Song of J. Alfred Prufrock", T. S. Eliot quickly sets a certain tone, and then creates effect by juxtaposing it with a very different tone:

Let us go then, you and I,
When the evening is spread out against the sky
Like a patient etherized upon a table

=== Visual and concrete poetry ===
Poets such as E. E. Cummings experiment with punctuation and the words' layout on a page. In doing so, they venture into a realm of poetry that really cannot be read aloud: it can only be experienced through the eye.

l(a

le
af
fa

ll

s)
one
l

iness

Cummings has fractured language into its most atomic elements. To analyze the poem, the reader must first reassemble these into meaningful units: a brief, evocative image—"a leaf falls"—appearing, like an unbidden thought, in the middle of a word, "loneliness". A single falling leaf is by itself a fine image for the feeling of loneliness, but in order to fully experience the poem, the reader must then put the elements of language back into the visual form in which Cummings arranged them: a vertical line (like a leaf falling to the ground), followed by a horizontal series of letters (like a leaf laying flat on the ground). The vertical line is dominated by the word "one" (an absolutely appropriate expression of loneliness) and by the letter "l" (which, on the page, looks like the numeral 1... it looks like "one").

Numerous other poets, including George Herbert, Lewis Carroll, William Blake, Wyndham Lewis, and John Hollander have used the layout of words, letters, and images on the page to create effect in their poems. An analytic reader of poetry must attend to the eye as well as the ear and the mind.

== Approaches ==
=== Schools of poetry ===
There are many different 'schools' of poetry: oral, classical, romantic, modernist, etc. and they each vary in their use of the elements described above.

Schools of poetry may be self-identified by the poets that form them (such as Imagism) or defined by critics who see unifying characteristics of a body of work by more than one poet (for example The Movement). To be a 'school' a group of poets must share a common style or a common ethos. A commonality of form is not in itself sufficient to define a school; for example, Edward Lear, George du Maurier and Ogden Nash do not form a school simply because they all wrote limericks.

=== Schools of criticism ===
Poetry analysis is almost as old as poetry itself, with distinguished practitioners going back to figures such as Plato. At various times and places, groups of like-minded readers and scholars have developed, shared, and promoted specific approaches to poetry analysis.

The New Criticism dominated English and American literary criticism from the 1920s to the early 1960s. The New Critical approach insists on the value of close reading and rejects extra-textual sources. The New Critics also rejected the idea that the work of a critic or analyst is to determine an author's intended meaning (a view formalized by W.K. Wimsatt and Monroe Beardsley as the intentional fallacy). The New Critics prized ambiguity, and tended to favor works that lend themselves to multiple interpretations.

Reader-response criticism developed in Germany and the United States as a reaction to New Criticism. It emphasises the reader's role in the development of meaning.

Reception theory is a development of reader-response criticism that considers the public response to a literary work and suggests that this can inform analysis of cultural ideology at the time of the response.

=== Reading poetry aloud ===
All poetry was originally oral, it was sung or chanted; poetic form as we know it is an abstraction therefrom when writing replaced memory as a way of preserving poetic utterances, but the ghost of oral poetry never vanishes. Poems may be read silently to oneself, or may be read aloud solo or to other people. Although reading aloud to oneself raises eyebrows in many circles, few people find it surprising in the case of poetry.

In fact, many poems reveal themselves fully only when they are read aloud. The characteristics of such poems include (but are not limited to) a strong narrative, regular poetic meter, simple content and simple form. At the same time, many poems that read well aloud have none of the characteristics exhibited by T. S. Eliot's "Journey of the Magi", for example. Poems that read aloud well include:

- "The Frog", by Jean Dao
- "One Art", by Elizabeth Bishop
- "The Tyger", by William Blake
- "Meeting at Night", by Robert Browning
- "She Walks in Beauty", by Byron
- "The Song of the Western Men", by Robert Stephen Hawker
- "November in England", by Thomas Hood
- "Dream Variations", by Langston Hughes
- "The Jackdaw of Rheims", by Thomas Ingoldsby
- "To put one brick upon another", by Philip Larkin
- "Paul Revere's Ride", by Henry Wadsworth Longfellow
- "Adventures of Isabel", by Ogden Nash
- "Nothing but Death", by Pablo Neruda translated by Robert Bly
- "A Small Elegy", by Jirí Orten translated by Lynn Coffin
- "Ozymandias", by Percy Bysshe Shelley
- "The Cat in the Hat", by Dr. Seuss
- "Sea Surface Full of Clouds", by Wallace Stevens
- "Silver", by Walter de la Mare
- "How to Tell a Story", by Robert Penn Warren
- "On Westminster Bridge", by William Wordsworth

== Poetry in different cultures ==
This article is focused on poetry written in English and reflects anglophone culture. Other cultures have other poetic forms and differ in their attitudes towards poetry.

== Bibliography ==
- Auden, W.H. and Norman Holmes (Eds.) Restoration and Augustan Poets: Milton to Goldsmith. (New York: Viking Press, 1950) ISBN 0-14-015039-0
- Cummings, E. E. Complete Poems: 1913–1962. (New York: Harcouth Brace Jovanovich, 1968). ISBN 0-15-121060-8
- Greene, Roland; et al., eds. (2012). The Princeton Encyclopedia of Poetry and Poetics (4th rev. ed.). Princeton, NJ: Princeton University Press. ISBN 978-0-691-15491-6.
- Harrison, G. B. (Ed.). Shakespeare: The Complete Works. (New York: Harcourt Brace Jovanovich, 1968) ISBN 0-15-580530-4
- Hirsch, Edward. How to Read a Poem and Fall in Love with Poetry. (New York: Harcourt Brace, 1999) ISBN 0-15-100419-6
- Kennedy, X. J. Literature: An Introduction to Fiction, Drama, and Poetry. (4th ed.) (Boston: Little, Brown, & Co. 1987) ISBN 0-673-39225-2
- Roberts, Edgar V. & Henry Jacobs (Eds.). Literature: An Introduction to Reading and Writing 6th edition. (Upper Saddle Creek, NJ: Prentice Hall, 2000) ISBN 0-13-018401-2
- Wallace, Robert. Writing Poems. (Boston: Little, Brown, & Co., 1982) ISBN 0-316-91996-9
