= Alfred Kalmus =

Austrian-born music publisher (1889–1972)

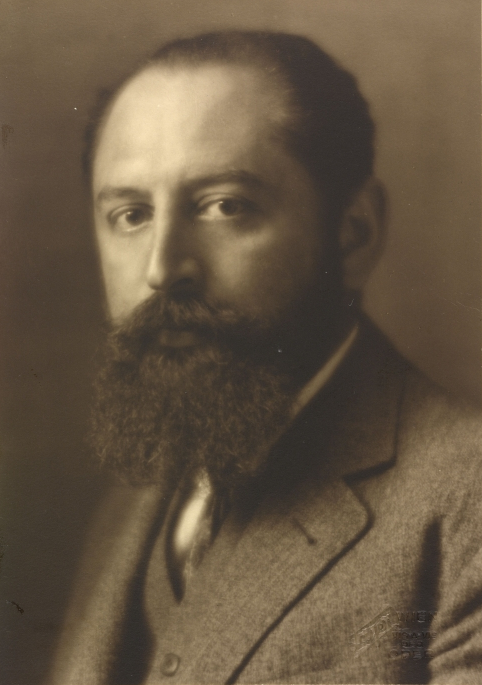
- Kalmus (March 1927)
- Born: 16 May 1889; Vienna, Austria
- Died: 24 September 1972 (aged 83); London, England
- Education: Vienna University
- Occupation: Music publisher

Alfred August Ulrich Kalmus (16 May 1889 – 24 September 1972) was an influential Austrian-born British music publisher.

== Life and work ==
Kalmus was born in Vienna, Austria, and studied law there, obtaining his Doctor of Letters from Vienna University in 1913. At the same time, he had been studying music with Guido Adler and in 1909 had joined the relatively new firm of Universal Edition. His work there brought him into contact with some of the leading figures in new music of that era, including Béla Bartók, Leoš Janáček, and the Second Viennese School: Arnold Schoenberg, Alban Berg, and Anton Webern. In 1923, he left Universal Edition to found the Wiener Philharmonischer Verlag (publisher of the Philharmonia Pocket Scores), but two years later he returned to his old firm when Universal Edition acquired Philharmonia.

When Emil Hertzka, director since 1907 of Universal Edition, died in 1932, Kalmus and Hugo Winter were appointed his joint successors, but political events in Austria drove Kalmus to emigrate to England, where he established Universal Edition London on 1 July 1936. After the Nazi Anschluss of Austria in March 1938, Winter was dismissed and relations between the two branches of Universal Edition were severed (Simeone 2001). Since the sequestration of UE by the Nazi regime was valid only within Germany, Universal Edition London was taken over by Boosey & Hawkes. Ralph Hawkes who, in contrast to most British music publishers of the time, had an outward-looking, European view of the business, had been the UK representative for UE since 1923. During the war years, Kalmus founded the Anglo-Soviet Music Press with the aim of introducing to the UK the latest works of composers such as Sergei Prokofiev, Dmitri Shostakovich, and Dmitry Kabalevsky. He was also involved with promoting neglected contemporary music through the Boosey & Hawkes concerts.

Universal Edition London regained its independence in 1949, and on 5 June 1951 rejoined the newly reconstituted UE Vienna, with Kalmus becoming a director together with Alfred Schlee and Ernst Hartmann. The rapid restoration of the firm to its position as the pre-eminent publisher of modern music in Europe was largely due to the efforts of Schlee in Vienna and Kalmus in London. In the postwar period, Kalmus paid particular attention to such younger and more radical composers as Luciano Berio from Italy, Pierre Boulez from France, and Karlheinz Stockhausen from Germany, as well as English composers such as Richard Rodney Bennett, Harrison Birtwistle, David Bedford, and Hugh Wood.

For his eightieth birthday in 1969, eleven of the composers with whom he was most closely associated were asked to contribute to a collective celebratory programme, called A Garland for Dr. K. It was performed on 22 April 1969 at the Queen Elizabeth Hall in the Southbank Centre, London, a few weeks ahead of the actual birthday by the Pierrot Players. Kalmus continued to be active in running the London branch of UE until his death in London on 24 September 1972.

== See also ==
- List of émigré composers in Britain
