= Henri Pousseur =

Belgian composer (1929–2009)

- Born: 23 June 1929; Malmedy, Belgium
- Died: 6 March 2009 (aged 79); Brussels, Belgium
- Occupations: Composer; academic teacher; music theorist
- Organizations: Centre de recherches et de formation musicales de Wallonie
- Website: henripousseur.net

Henri Léon Marie-Thérèse Pousseur (French: [ɑ̃ʁi leɔ̃ maʁi teʁɛz pusœʁ]; 23 June 1929 – 6 March 2009) was a Belgian composer, teacher, and music theorist.

== Biography ==
Pousseur was born on 23 June 1929 in Malmedy, Liège Province, Belgium, and studied at the Academies of Music in Liège and Brussels from 1947 to 1952, where he joined the group called Variations, associated with Pierre Froidebise. It was in this group that he first became familiar with the music of Anton Webern and other 20th-century composers. During his period of military service in 1952–53 at Mechelen, he maintained close contact with André Souris. He encountered Pierre Boulez in 1951 at Royaumont, and this contact inspired his Trois chants sacrés, composed that same year. In 1953, he met Karlheinz Stockhausen, and in 1956 Luciano Berio. A less-well-known influence from his early years was the music of Anton Bruckner, and he maintained a lifelong interest in medieval and Renaissance music, as well as in non-European music.

In 1954, Pousseur married Théa Schoonbrood, with whom he had four children: Isabelle (1957), Denis (1958), Marianne (1961), and Hélène (1965).

Pousseur taught in Cologne, Basel, and at the University at Buffalo in the United States, as well as in his native Belgium. From 1970 until his retirement in 1988, he taught at the University and Conservatory of Liège, where he also founded the Centre de recherches et de formation musicales de Wallonie, in 2010 renamed in his honour as Centre Henri Pousseur. He died of bronchial pneumonia in Brussels on the morning of 6 March 2009, aged 79.

== Music ==
Generally regarded as a member of the Darmstadt School in the 1950s, Pousseur's music employs serialism, as well as mobile and aleatory forms, often mediating between or among seemingly irreconcilable styles. Herman Sabbe wrote that Pousseur "serialized composite, even multicultural, music-stylistic identities as elements of composition".

=== Scambi ===
Scambi (1957), an electronic composition realized at the Studio di Fonologia in Milan, is unusual in the tape-music medium, because it is explicitly meant to be assembled in different ways before listening. When first created, several different versions were realized: two by Berio, one by Marc Wilkinson, and two by Pousseur himself. Since 2004, the Scambi Project, directed by John Dack of the Lansdown Centre for Electronic Arts at Middlesex University in London, has focused on this work and its multiple possibilities for realization.

=== Butor collaborations, Votre Faust, and Colors ===
Starting in 1960, Pousseur collaborated with Michel Butor on a number of projects, most notably the opera Votre Faust (1960–68).

Croisées des couleurs croisées (1970), a composition in three parts, sets a text on or by African Americans and Native Americans that excerpts Chief Seattle's speech and William Lloyd Garrison's open letter "To the Public". Scored for an amplified female voice (preferably Black), 2–5 pianos, and 6 sound sources (2 radios, 2 tape recorders, and 2 turntables), it runs about 25 minutes. It was dedicated in memoriam to Martin Luther King Jr. and commissioned by the Juilliard Ensemble. Pousseur led the premiere in New York City that year, with the mezzo-soprano Joy Blackett. Alain Féron called it an indictment of racism in which the emotional force of the message is matched by its sound organization.

The composition grew out of Couleurs croisées (1966) for large orchestra, commissioned by the Koussevitzky Foundation at the Library of Congress, In the 1960s, Pousseur aimed to develop his own, freer style, and both compositions rework the civil rights movement anthem "We Shall Overcome". He explained that when writing Couleurs croisées, he wanted to add a voice modeled on the manner of a Black church minister and powerful enough to hold its own against the orchestra. In Croisées des couleurs croisées, the pianos inherit much of this earlier piece's harmonic and rhythmic material.

== Scholarship ==
In addition to his compositional and teaching activities, Pousseur published many articles and ten books on music, amongst which are Fragments Théorique I: sur la musique expérimentale (Brussels: Université libre de Bruxelles, 1970), Schumann le Poète: 25 moments d'une lecture de Dichterliebe (Paris: Klincksieck, 1993), and Musiques croisées (Paris: L'Harmattan, 1997). In 2004, two volumes of his collected writings, selected and edited by Pascal Decroupet, were issued by the Belgian publisher Pierre Mardaga Pousseau. He also published the first French translation of the writings of Alban Berg.

== Selected compositions ==
- Sept Versets des Psaumes de la Pénitence for four vocal soloists or mixed choir (1950)
- Trois Chants sacrés for soprano and string trio (1951)
- Prospection for three pianos tuned in sixths of a tone (1952–53)
- Séismogrammes electronic music (1954)
- Symphonies à 15 Solistes (1954–55)
- Quintette à la memoire d'Anton Webern for clarinet, bass clarinet, violin, cello, and piano (1955)
- Scambi, electronic music (1957)
- Mobile for two pianos (1957–58)
- Rimes pour différentes sources sonores for orchestra and tape (1958)
- Madrigal I for clarinet (1958)
- Ode for string quartet (1960–61)
- Madrigal II for four early instruments (flute, violin, viola da gamba, harpsichord) (1961)
- Trois Visages de Liège electronic music (1961)
- Caractères for piano (1961)
- Madrigal III for clarinet, violin, cello, 2 percussionists, and piano (1962)
- Votre Faust (1960–68), opera for five actors, four singers, thirteen instruments, and electronic music, libretto by Michel Butor. Several "satellite" works are related to this opera:
  - Miroir de Votre Faust (Caractères II) for solo piano and (optional) soprano (1964–65)
  - Jeu de Miroirs de Votre Faust for piano, soprano and tape (1964–65)
  - Echos de Votre Faust for mezzo-soprano, flute, cello, and piano (1961–69)
  - Les Ruines de Jéruzona for mixed choir and "rhythm section" (1978)
  - La Passion selon Guignol for amplified vocal quartet and orchestra (1981)
  - Parade de Votre Faust for orchestra (1974)
  - Aiguillages au carrefour des immortels for 16 or 17 instruments (2002)
  - Il sogno di Leporello: Parade 2 (de Votre Faust) for orchestra (2005)
- Apostrophe et six Réflexions for piano (1964–66)
- Phonèmes pour Cathy for mezzo-soprano solo (1966)
- Couleurs croisées for large orchestra (1967)
- Mnémosyne monody solo voice or instrument, or unison choir (1968)
- Mnémosyne II for variable media (1969)
- Les Éphémérides d'Icare 2 for a soloist, three-part concertino, and four instrumental quartets (1970)
- Crosses of Crossed Colors for vocal soloist, two to five pianos, six tape-recorder operators, two turntablists, and two radio operators (1970)
- Paraboles-Mix electronic music (1972)
- Vue sur les Jardins interdits for saxophone quartet (1973)
- Die Erprobung des Petrus Hebraïcus chamber opera in three acts, libretto by Léo Wintgens after Michel Butor (1974). Several "satellite" works are related to this opera:
  - Chroniques berlinoises for piano and string quartet with baritone ad lib. (1975)
  - Chroniques illustrées for large orchestra with baritone ad lib. (1976)
  - Ballade berlinoise for piano solo (1977)
  - Humeurs du Futur quotidien for two reciters and chamber orchestra (1978)
  - Pédigrée for female voice and seven instruments (1980)
  - Chroniques canines, for two pianos with soprano voice ad lib. (1984)
- Canines for voice and piano (1980)
- Flexions IV for viola solo (1980)
- La Seconde Apothéose de Rameau for 21 instruments (1981)
- Chroniques canines for two pianos with soprano ad lib (1984)
- Tales and Songs from the Bible of Hell four singers with real-time electronic transformation and pre-recorded 4 track tape (1979)
- La Passion selon Guignol for amplified vocal quartet and orchestra (1981)
- La Paganania for solo violin (1982)
- La Paganania seconda for solo cello (1982)
- Traverser la Forêt (1987)
- Déclarations d'Orage for reciter, soprano, baritone, three improvising instruments (alto saxophone, tuba, synthesizer), large orchestra and tape (1988–89)
- At Moonlight, Dowland's Shadow passes along Ginkaku-Ji for shakuhachi, shamisen, and koto (1989)
- Leçons d'Enfer music theatre for 2 actors, 3 singers, 7 instruments, tape, and live electronics; texts by Arthur Rimbaud and Michel Butor (1990–91)
- Dichterliebesreigentraum for soprano, baritone, two solo pianos, choir and orchestra (1992–93)
- Aquarius-Mémorial (in memoriam Karel Goeyvaerts)
  1. Les Litanies d'Icare for piano (1994)
  2. Danseurs Gnidiens cherchant la Perle clémentine for chamber orchestra (1998)
  3. Les Fouilles de Jéruzona for orchestra (1995)
  4. Icare au Jardin du Verseau for piano and chamber orchestra (1999)
- La Guirlande de Pierre for soprano, baritone and piano (1997)
- Navigations for harp (2000)
- Seize Paysages planétaires ethno-electroacoustical music (2000)
- Les Icare africains for solo voices, ad lib. choir, and orchestra (2002)
- Stèle à la mémoire de Pierre Froidebise for solo clarinet (2009), unfinished at the composer's death, completed and premiered by Jean-Pierre Peuvion
