= Alan Hacker =

- Born: Alan Ray Hacker; 30 September 1938; Dorking, Surrey, England
- Died: 16 April 2012 (aged 73) Malton, North Yorkshire
- Genres: Classical
- Occupations: Musician; Conductor; Music Professor
- Instrument: Clarinet
- Years active: 1958–2012

Alan Ray Hacker OBE FRAM (30 September 1938 – 16 April 2012) was an English clarinettist, conductor, and music professor.

== Biography ==
He was born in Dorking, Surrey in 1938, the son of Kenneth and Sybil Hacker. After attending Dulwich College (from 1950 to 1955, under Stanley Wilson until the end of 1953), studied at the Royal Academy of Music where he won the Dove Prize and the Boise Travelling Scholarship, which he used to study in Paris, Bayreuth and Vienna.

In 1958 he joined the London Philharmonic Orchestra. He became a professor in the Royal Academy of Music in 1960 and founded the Pierrot Players in 1965 with American pianist Stephen Pruslin and Harrison Birtwistle. In 1966, a thrombosis on his spinal column caused permanent paraplegia. For the rest of his life he used a wheelchair and drove adapted cars. In 1972, the Pierrot Players renamed themselves the Fires of London and Hacker continued to perform with them until 1976. In 1971, he founded his own group, Matrix. He was also appointed chairman of the Institute of Contemporary Arts Music section and of the British section of the International Society for Contemporary Music. He was one of those credited with reviving the basset clarinet, and in 1967, he restored the original text of Mozart's Concerto and Quintet. He played them on an instrument modelled on that for which Mozart originally wrote them, the Stadler's extended basset clarinet.

Hacker founded the Music Party in 1972, a group dedicated to the authentic performance of classical music. The subsequent establishment of the Classical Orchestra in York was also a vehicle which promoted the performances on original instruments. Hacker also branched out into conducting opera, where he led performances of works from Monteverdi's Ulisse to Birtwistle's The Io Passion.

In the 1972–1973 academic year he was the Sir Robert Mayer lecturer in Leeds University. From 1976 to 1984 he was lecturer and from 1984 to 1987 senior lecturer in music in the University of York.

Hacker was awarded the OBE for services to music in 1988. In 1994, he was a guest on Desert Island Discs.

== Personal life ==
Hacker was married three times. In 1959, he married Anna Maria Sroka, with whom he had two daughters, Katy and Sophie. His second marriage, to Karen Wynne Evans in 1976, produced a son, Alcuin. His third wife, Margaret Lee, survived him, as did his children and first two wives.

== Publications ==
- Scores of Mozart Concerto and Quintet – 1972
- 1st ed. of reconstructed Mozart Concerto – 1973
