= Roman Haubenstock-Ramati =

Polish composer and music editor

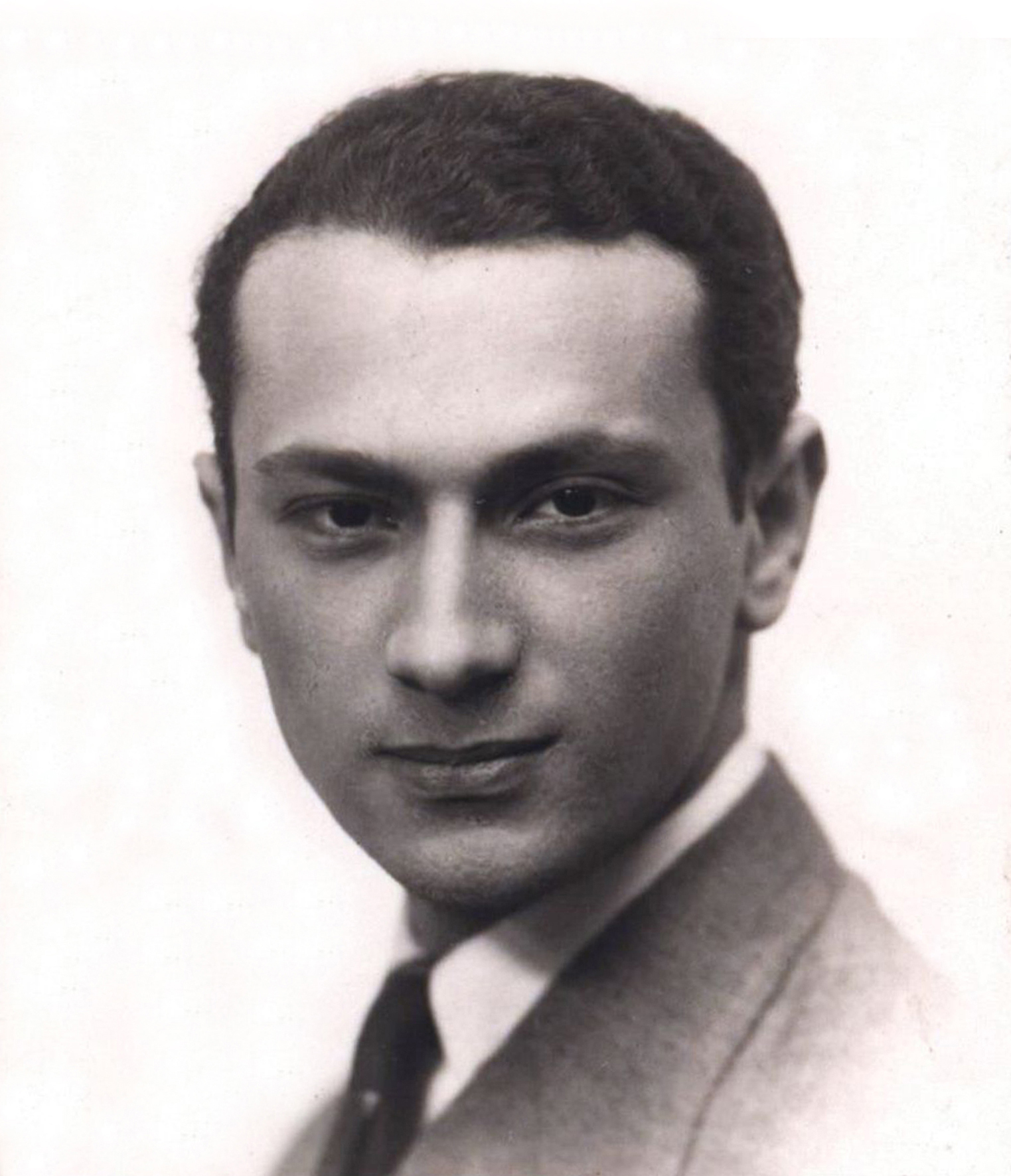
Roman Haubenstock-Ramati

Roman Haubenstock-Ramati, born Roman Haubenstock (Hebrew: רוֹמן האובּנשׁטוֹק-רָמָתִי; 27 February 1919 – 3 March 1994) was a composer and music editor who worked in Kraków, Tel Aviv and Vienna.

== Life ==
Haubenstock-Ramati was born in Tonie (a village near Krakow, to which it was incorporated only in 1941) as a son of Samuel (a farmer) and Regina née Gronner. He obtained his secondary school-leaving certificate at the Cracow 2nd State St. Jack Gymnasium in 1937. After that he studied composition, music theory, violin and philosophy there from 1934 to 1938, and in Lemberg from 1939 to 1941. Among his teachers were Artur Malawski and Józef Koffler.

In 1939, his family fled from the Germans to Lviv, which was incorporated into the Soviet Union as a result of the Hitler-Stalin Pact. Due to his multilingualism, he was arrested shortly before the German invasion of the Soviet Union in 1941 on charges of espionage and deported to Tomsk via Odessa. There he was amnestied to join General Władysław Anders' Polish Army and arrived in Palestine with the 2nd Polish Corps.

He stayed there for several years and in 1943 he took the second part of his surname "Ramati" - from then on he appeared as Roman Haubenstock-Ramati.

After his coming back to Poland - from 1947 to 1950 he was head of the music department of Kraków Radio, and from 1950 to 1956 he was director of the State Music Library in Tel Aviv. In 1957 he was awarded a six-month stipend for the Academy for musique concrète. From 1957 to 1968 he was an editor of new music for Universal Edition in Vienna. In addition he gave guest lectures and composition seminars in Tel Aviv, Stockholm, Darmstadt, Bilthoven (the Netherlands) and Buenos Aires, and from 1973 held a professorship at the Musikhochschule in Vienna. He died in Vienna in 1994.

Haubenstock-Ramati was also a designer and painter.

== Works ==
- String Trio No. 1 Ricercari (1948)
- Bénédictions (Blessings) for soprano (vocals) and nine instruments (1951)
- Recitativo ed aria (Konzert für Cembalo und Orchester) (1954)
- Studie in Form, graphic score (1954)
- Papageno's Pocket-Size, concerto for glockenspiel and orchestra (1956)
- Les Symphonies de timbres for orchestra (1957)
- Chants et prismes for orchestra (1957)
- Exerque pour une symphonie for tape (1957)
- Passacaille for tape (1957)
- Chanson populaire for tape (1957)
- L'amen de verre for tape (1957)
- Ständchen sur le nom de Heinrich Strobel for orchestra (1958)
- Petite musique de nuit, mobile for orchestra (1958)
- Séquences [version 1] for violin and orchestra (1958)
- Interpolation, mobile for flute (one, two or three flutes or tape recordings) (1958)
- Liaisons, mobile for vibraphone and marimbaphone with one performer and tape or for two performers (1958)
- Séquences [version 2] for violin and chamber orchestra (1958–88)
- Décisions, ten graphic scores for undefined sound sources (1959–71)
- Jeux 6, mobile for six percussionists (1960)
- Credentials or "Think, Think Lucky" for voice (speaker) and eight players (1960)
- Mobile for Shakespeare for voice and six players (1960)
- Twice for Cathy for voice and tape (1960)
- Prosa-Texte [version 1] for four reciting choirs (1962)
- Prosa-Texte [version 2] for two reciting choirs and tape (1962)
- Prosa-Texte [version 3] for reciting choir and tape (1962)
- Vermutungen über ein dunkles Haus for three orchestras, two of which are pre-recorded (1962–63)
- Amerika, opera in two parts after Franz Kafka's novel (1962–64)
- Jeux 2, mobile for two percussionists (1965)
- Rounds, for six performers (1965)
- Multiple 1 for two string instruments ad libitum (1965)
- Multiple 2 for three string instruments, two woodwind instruments and two brass instruments ad libitum (1965)
- Multiple 3 for two string instruments, two woodwind instruments and two brass instruments ad libitum (1965)
- Multiple 4 for one woodwind instrument and one brass instrument ad libitum (1965)
- Multiple 5 for one string instrument and one woodwind instrument ad libitum (1965)
- Multiple 6 for one string instrument and one brass instrument ad libitum (1965)
- Klavierstücke I for piano (1965)
- Alone 1, graphic score for undefined low-pitched instrument and percussion ad libitum (1965)
- Jeux 4, mobile for four percussionists (1966)
- Tableau I for orchestra (1967)
- Psalm for orchestra (1967)
- Symphonie 'K' for orchestra (1967)
- Comédie, anti-opera in one act after Samuel Beckett (1967)
- Catch 1 for one or two harpsichords (1968)
- Catch 2 for one or two pianos (1968)
- Divertimento, composer's text collage after Plato and others, for actors, dancers, and (or) mimes, two percussionists, tape or live *electronics ad libitum (1968)
- Alone 2, graphic score for ensemble (1969)
- Batterie, graphic score for percussion (1969)
- Describe for voice and piano (1969)
- Tableau II for orchestra (1970)
- Ludus musicalis, twelve models for group of young musicians and for school orchestras (1970)
- Madrigal for a four-part mixed choir a cappella (1970)
- Tableau III for orchestra (1971)
- Multiple 7 for trumpet and cello (1971)
- Konstellationen – mixed media, 25 sheets of graphic score (1971)
- In memoriam Igor Stravinsky, graphic score for undefined instrument (1971)
- Chorographie I for three a cappella choirs (1971)
- Act-if, graphic score for ensemble (1971)
- Discours, graphic score for guitar and voice (speaker) (1972)
- Duo, graphic score for guitar and percussion (1972)
- Kreise, graphic score for voice (speaker) and percussion (1972)
- La sonnambula, graphic score for vocals (speaker) and guitar ad libitum (1972)
- Frame, graphic score for guitar solo (1972)
- Kammermusik for orchestra (1972)
- Poetics I für James Joyce. The Moon Is Still Blue, graphic score for ensemble (1972)
- Poetics II für James Joyce. Speload Mc, graphic score for ensemble (1972)
- Solo, graphic score for any string instrument (1972)
- Concerto a tre for piano, trombone, and percussion (1973)
- String Quartet No. 1 (1973)
- Hexachord 1 and 2 for one or two guitars (1973)
- Shapes 1 for pipe organ (1973)
- Shapes 2 for pipe organ, piano, harpsichord, and celesta for one, two, or four performers (1973)
- Pour piano, graphic score (1973)
- Sonans, graphic score for vocal ensemble and tape or live electronics ad libitum (1973)
- Musik für 12 Instrumente (1974)
- Concerto for Strings (1975)
- Cello Sonata (1975)
- Endless for seven performers (1975)
- Chordophonie 1, mobile for harpsichord (1976)
- Chordophonie 2, mobile for clavichord (1976)
- Symphonien for orchestra (1977)
- String Quartet No. 2 (1977)
- Song for percussion (1978)
- Self I for bass clarinet (or clarinet) and live electronics (1978)
- Self II for alto saxophone and live electronics (1978)
- Polyphonien for one-two orchestras or orchestra with tape accompaniment (1978)
- Ulysses. Scenen einer Wanderung, ballet – twelve tableaus for tape (1979)
- Nocturnes I for orchestra (1981)
- Nocturnes II for orchestra (1982)
- Ohne Titel, graphic score for pipe organ (1983)
- Piano Sonata (1983)
- Musik für zwei Klaviere (1983–84)
- Cantando for six performers (1984)
- Mirrors/Miroirs I, mobile for sixteen pianos (1984)
- Mirrors/Miroirs II, mobile for eight pianos (1984)
- Mirrors/Miroirs III, mobile for six pianos (1984)
- Schlossbergmusik, sound installation (1984)
- Nocturnes III for orchestra (1985)
- String Trio No. 2 (1985)
- Enchaîné for saxophone quartet (1985)
- Für Kandinsky, trio for flute, oboe, and clarinet (1985)
- Sottovoce for chamber orchestra (1986)
- Trio (Enchaîné II) for flute, oboe, and piano (1986)
- Imaginaire for orchestra (1986–87)
- Zeichen für S.B., graphic score for soloists and plucked string instruments' orchestra (1987)
- Beaubourg musique for chamber orchestra (1988)
- Cathédrale I for harp solo (1988)
- Cathédrale II, mobile for two to sixteen harps (1988)
- Extensions for one or two marimbas (1988)
- For Boguslaw Schaeffer for flutes, percussion, keyboard instrument, and computer (1989)
- Deux préludes for guitar (1989)
- Invocations for chamber orchestra (1990)
- Pluriel [version 1], mobile for two violins, viola, and cello (1991)
- Pluriel [version 2], mobile for violin, viola, and cello (1991)
- Pluriel [version 3], mobile for violin and viola (1991)
- Pluriel [version 4], mobile for violin and cello (1991)
- Pluriel [version 5], mobile for viola and cello (1991)
- Tenebrae for tape (1991)
- Tenebrae II for tape and piano (1991)
- Adagio I for tape (1991)
- Adagio II for saxophone and tape (1991)
- Morendo for tape (1991)
- Morendo II for flute and tape (1991)
- Unruhiges Wohnen, ballet (1991–92)
- Nouvoletta I, mobile for flute, piano, percussion, and cello (1992)
- Nouvoletta II, mobile for flute, piano, percussion, and cello (1992)
- Nouvoletta III, mobile for flute, harp, percussion, and celesta (or harpsichord) (1992)
- Nouvoletta IV, mobile na for flute, percussion, cello, and celesta (or harpsichord) (1992)
- Nouvoletta V, mobile for flute, cello, and percussion (1992)
- Nouvoletta VI, mobile for flute, percussion, and celesta (or harpsichord) (1992)
- Nouvoletta VII, mobile for cello, percussion, and celesta (or harpsichord) (1992)
- Équilibre for chamber ensemble (1993)
