= Open form =

Characteristic of visual art

Contrasting examples

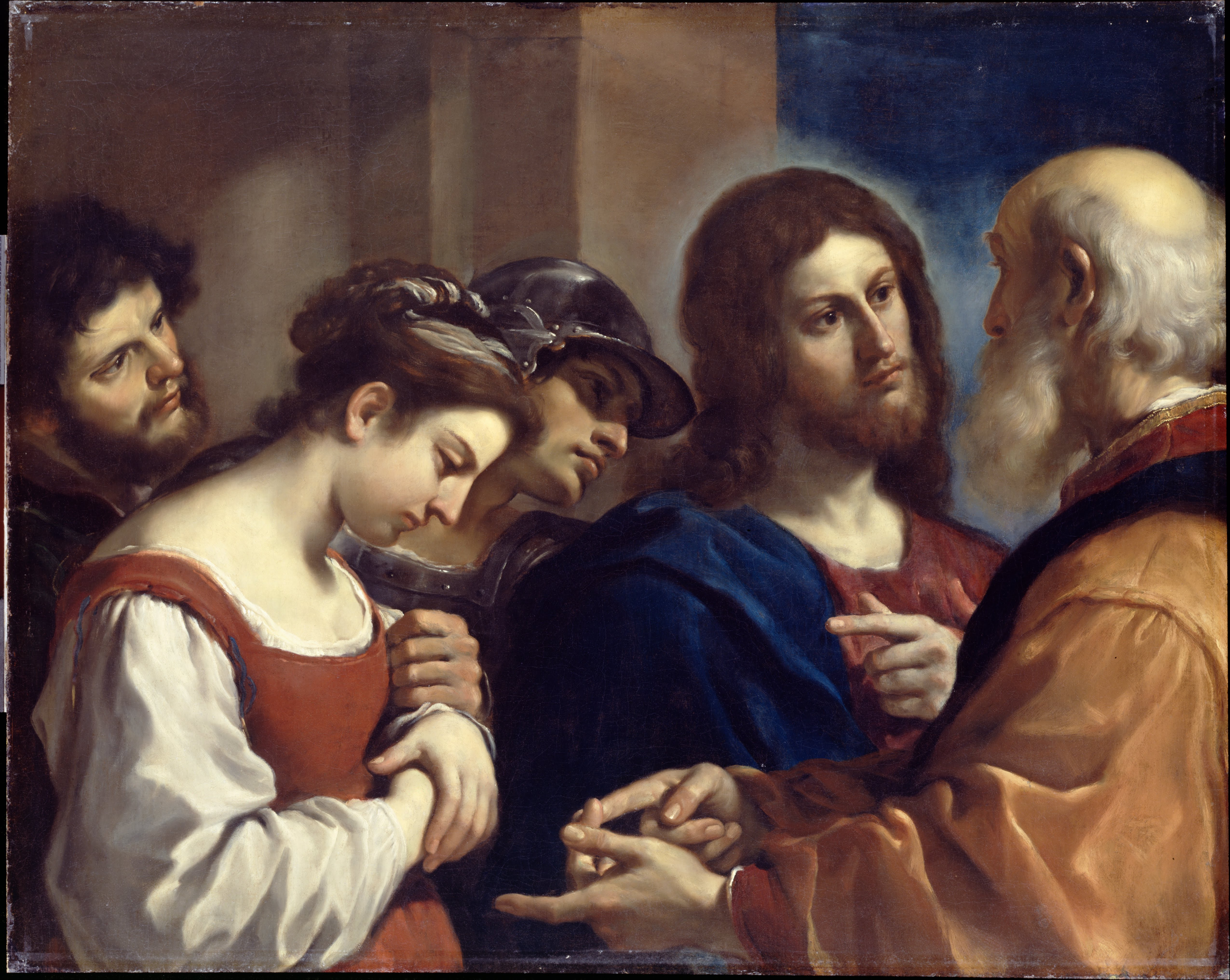
Example of Baroque "Open Form": Guercino's The Woman taken in Adultery

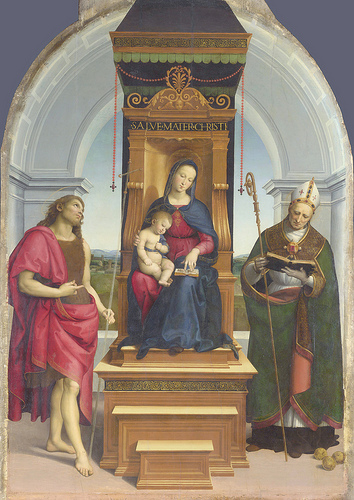
Example of Renaissance "Closed Form": Raphael's Ansidei Madonna

Open form is a term coined by Heinrich Wölfflin in 1915 to describe a characteristic of Baroque art opposed to the "closed form" of the Renaissance. Wölfflin tentatively offered several alternative pairs of terms, in particular "a-tectonic" and "tectonic" (also free/strict and irregular/regular), but settled on open/closed because, despite their undesirable ambiguity, they make a better distinction between the two styles precisely because of their generality. In an open form, which is characteristic of 17th-century painting, the style "everywhere points out beyond itself and purposely looks limitless", in contrast to the self-contained entity of a closed form, in which everything is "pointing everywhere back to itself". In general, the closed compositions of the 16th century are dominated by the vertical and horizontal, and by the opposition of these two dimensions. Seventeenth-century painters, by contrast, de-emphasize these oppositions so that, even when they are present, they lose their tectonic force. The diagonal, on the other hand, becomes the main device used to negate or obscure the rectangularity of the picture space.

Although the term first occurred only in this book, the foundations for this concept had already been articulated by Wölfflin in 1888, in his earlier book Renaissance und Barock. The closed/open pairing was one of five pairs of opposed categories to contrast the differences between the two periods. The others were the linear and the painterly, plane and depth, multiplicity and unity, and clearness and unclearness.

The concept was soon adopted in other fields. Although in Wölfflin's opinion architecture could only be tectonic and therefore "closed", the notion of openness found its way into the theory of architecture by 1932, when Helmuth Plessner gave a lecture on modernist architecture in Germany to mark the twenty-fifth anniversary of the Deutscher Werkbund.

The essentially dynamic character of the film medium was seen as an essentially open form, in contrast to the closed form of selected "stills" from the same film, which could be appreciated for their pictorial composition.
