= Hugh Wood =

British composer (1932–2021)

Hugh Wood (27 June 1932 – 14 August 2021) was a British composer.

== Biography ==
Wood was born in Parbold, Lancashire and grew up in a musical family; while still a teenager, he was encouraged by the composer Alan Bush. He was educated at Oundle School. He says that his "earliest enthusiasm was Bach... and that's been at the center of everything ever since." After military service in Egypt, he studied history at New College, Oxford, where he dedicated much of his time to music and writing compositions for the theatre. In 1954, he moved to London to study composition privately with William Lloyd Webber, Anthony Milner, Iain Hamilton, and Mátyás Seiber. He also started a parallel career as a music teacher by finding work in schools, including Morley College, and as a lecturer at the Royal Academy of Music.

In 1958, Wood composed his first published work: a set of variations for viola and piano showing the influence of Schoenberg and thematic references to Beethoven, which was premiered by Cecil Aronowitz. His first orchestral work, Scenes from Comus (with soloists and chorus), was commissioned by the BBC and composed between 1962 and 1965. Its premiere at the 1965 BBC Proms provided Wood a public success.

Wood's works are always cogently constructed, knitting together densely wrought counterpoint with rigorous motivic working, sometimes using a personalized serialist language. His music commands a broad communicative range: it can be violently expressionistic, poignantly lyrical, or even, as in the jazz inflected Piano Concerto, exuberantly rhythmic. Wood liked to compose slowly and he typically preferred chamber music genres, though several of his large-scale works, such as his Symphony and Violin Concerto, are amongst his best known.

In his later years, Wood contributed several articles on music to The Times Literary Supplement. In 2007, his collected writings on music, Staking Out the Territory was published by Plumbago Books and the following year Ashgate Books published The Music of Hugh Wood by Edward Venn. Wood died on 14 August 2021 at age 89. His former wife Susan and two of their children, Rebecca and Christopher, survive him. His third child, Jenny, died in 1988.

=== Career highlights ===
- 1965 – highly acclaimed Proms premiere of BBC commission Scenes from Comus.
- 1969 – Proms premiere of Cello Concerto, commissioned by the BBC.
- 1978 – Premiere of String Quartet No 3 at the Bath Festival.
- 1982 – Proms premiere of Symphony by the BBC Symphony Orchestra.
- 1998 – UK premiere of Variations for Orchestra at Last Night of the Proms.
- 1999 – Serenade and Elegy premiered at Cheltenham Festival.
- 2001 – The Lindsay Quartet premiere String Quartet No 5 in Sheffield.
- 2015 – Proms premiere of BBC commission Epithalamion with BBC Symphony Chorus and orchestra conducted by Sir Andrew Davis

== Key works ==
- Variations for viola and piano, Op 1 (1958)
- Trio for flute, viola and piano, Op 3 (1961)
- Scenes from Comus, Op 6 (1965)
- Cello Concerto, Op 12 (1965–1969)
- Chamber Concerto for large ensemble, Op 15 (1971)
- Violin Concerto No.1, Op 17 (1970–1972)
- Song Cycle to Poems of Pablo Neruda for high voice and chamber orchestra, Op 19 (1973–1974)
- String Quartet No 3, Op 20 (1978)
- Symphony, Op 21 (1982)
- Piano Trio, Op 24 (1982–1984)
- Horn Trio, Op 29 (1989)
- Cantata for chorus and orchestra, Op 30 (1989)
- Piano Concerto, Op 32 (1991)
- Variations for Orchestra, Op 39 (1994–1997)
- Wild Cyclamen, Op 49 (2005–2006)
- Violin Concerto No.2, Op 50 (2003–2004)
- Michael Berkeley Tribute for viola solo (2004)
- Divertimento for Strings, Op 51 (2007)
- Clarinet Quintet, Op 53 (2007)
- Beginnings: Three Early Songs for soprano and strings, Op 54 (2010)
- Ithaka, for violin, viola and cello, Op 61 (2016)

== Recordings ==
- Clarinet Trio – Divine Art 25009
- Divertimento - Resonus RES10279
- Ithaka - Willowhayne WHR067
- The Kingdom of God – Hyperion CDA66758
- Overture; Variations Op.1; Paraphrase on 'Bird of Paradise'; Poem; Clarinet Trio; Piano Trio – Toccata Classics TOCC0075
- Scenes from Comus; Symphony – NMC D070
- String Quartet Nos 1–4 – Conifer 75605 51239-2
- String Quartet Nos 2 & 3; The Horses; The Rider Victory – Lyrita SRCD.304
- Violin Concerto; Cello Concerto – NMC D082
