= Fires of London =

British chamber music ensemble (1965-1987)

The Fires of London, founded as the Pierrot Players, was a British chamber music ensemble which was active from 1965 to 1987.

The Pierrot Players was founded by Harrison Birtwistle, Alan Hacker, and Stephen Pruslin. From 1967 it was under the joint direction of Birtwistle and Peter Maxwell Davies. The ensemble was formed to play Schoenberg's Pierrot Lunaire and new works, often with a theatrical element, for a similar scoring (usually with the addition of percussion). The instrumentation proved to be too limited for Birtwistle and he left in 1970. Maxwell Davies took over as sole director, renaming the group the Fires of London. It was disbanded after its 20th anniversary concert in 1987. Maxwell Davies subsequently endorsed a new group Psappha, based in Manchester, and remained their patron until his death in 2016.

During its existence, the Fires of London was particularly associated with Maxwell Davies' music, and gave first performances of many of his works, including Eight Songs for a Mad King, Vesalii Icones, The Martyrdom of St Magnus, Ave Maris Stella and Revelation and Fall. However it also premiered works by other composers, including Elliott Carter's Triple Duo, Birtwistle's Cantata, I Met Heine on the Rue Fürstenberg and The Viola in My Life 1 by Morton Feldman, Ocean de Terre by Oliver Knussen, and Der langwierige Weg in die Wohnung der Natascha Ungeheuer by Hans Werner Henze.

The group collaborated with the Early Music Consort of London on the soundtrack for the film The Devils.

== Instrumentation and players ==
Maxwell Davies described the basic instrumentation as flute, clarinet, violin, viola, cello, keyboards, percussion. Principal players in the formative years included Judith Pearce (flute), Alan Hacker (clarinet), Duncan Druce (violin), Jennifer Ward Clarke (cello) and Stephen Pruslin (piano).

The Fires of London was one of many ensembles created to play Pierrot Lunaire, and the presence of these ensembles led to many new works being written for the same instrumentation. This in turn led to the formation of yet more groups, leading to the establishment of the Pierrot ensemble (flute, clarinet, violin, cello, and piano) as a standard instrumentation in contemporary music.
