= List of compositions by Luigi Boccherini =

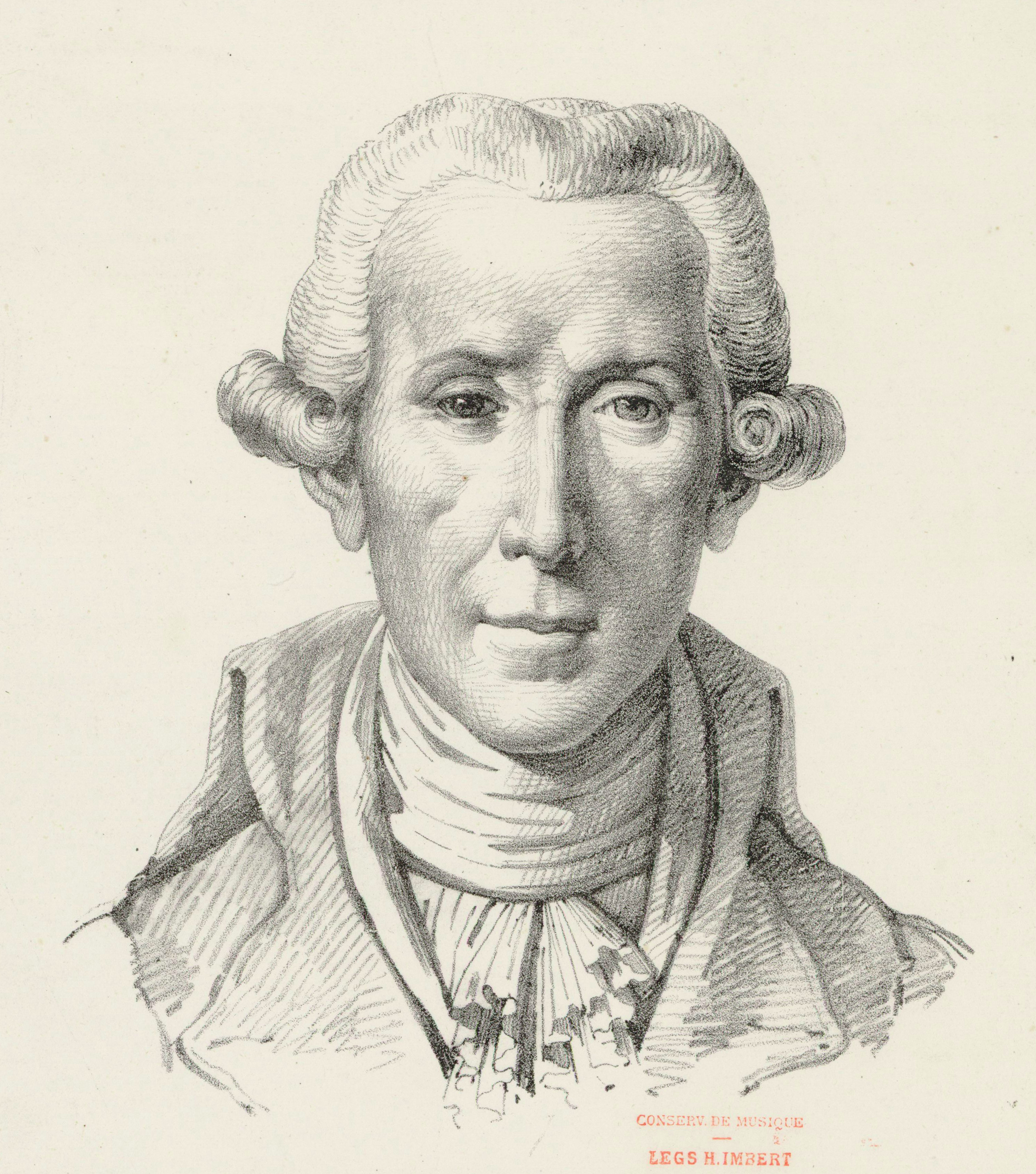
Pencil drawing of Luigi Boccherini by Etienne Mazas after a portrait bust

The following is a list of compositions by Luigi Boccherini. Boccherini's works were catalogued by the French musicologist Yves Gérard in his Thematic, Bibliographical and Critical Catalogue of the Works of Luigi Boccherini, published in 1969 by the Oxford University Press: hence the 'G' numbers for his output, similar to the 'K' (Köchel) numbers assigned to Mozart's works.

== Cello sonatas ==
- G. 1: Cello Sonata in F major
- G. 2a: Cello Sonata in C minor
- G. 2b: Cello Sonata in C minor
- G. 3: Cello Sonata in C major
- G. 4a: Cello Sonata in A major
- G. 4b: Cello Sonata in A major
- G. 5: Cello Sonata in G major
- G. 6: Cello Sonata in C major
- G. 7: Cello Sonata in C major
- G. 8: Cello Sonata in B♭ major
- G. 10: Cello Sonata in E♭ major
- G. 11: Cello Sonata in E♭ major
- G. 12: Cello Sonata in B♭ major
- G. 13: Cello Sonata in A major
- G. 14: Cello Sonata in E♭ major
- G. 15: Cello Sonata in G major
- G. 16: Cello Sonata in E♭ major
- G. 17: Cello Sonata in C major
- G. 18: Cello Sonata in C minor (may also be for viola)
- G. 19: Cello Sonata in F major
- G. 562: Cello Sonata in G minor
- G. 563: Cello Sonata in G major
- G. 564: Cello Sonata in D major
- G. 565a: Cello Sonata in B♭ major
- G. 565b: Cello Sonata in B♭ major
- G. 566: Cello Sonata in E♭ major
- G. 567: Cello Sonata in E♭ major
- G. 568: Cello Sonata in E♭ major
- G. 569: Cello Sonata in C major
- G. 579: Cello Sonata in F major
- G. 580: Cello Sonata in D major
- G deest: Cello Sonata in A major
- G deest: Cello Sonata in A minor
- G deest: Cello Sonata in C minor
- G deest: Cello Sonata in C minor
- G deest: Cello Sonata in D major
- G deest: Cello Sonata in E♭ major
- G deest: Cello Sonata in F minor

== Works for keyboard ==
- G. 22: Keyboard Sonata in E♭ major (from G30)
- G. 23: 6 Keyboard Sonatas from Trios G. 143–148
- G. 24: 6 Keyboard Sonatas from Trios G. 95–100

== Violin sonatas ==
- G. 20: 6 Violin Sonatas from cello sonatas
- G. 25: Violin Sonata Op. 5 No. 1 in B♭ major
- G. 26: Violin Sonata Op. 5 No. 2 in C major
- G. 27: Violin Sonata Op. 5 No. 3 in B♭ major
- G. 28: Violin Sonata Op. 5 No. 4 in D major
- G. 29: Violin Sonata Op. 5 No. 5 in G minor
- G. 30: Violin Sonata Op. 5 No. 6 in E♭ major
- G. 31: 6 Violin Sonatas (lost)
- G. 32: 3 Violin Sonatas, Book 3 (lost)
- G. 33: 3 Violin Sonatas, Book 4 (lost)
- G. 34: Violin Sonata Op. 13 No. 1 in C major
- G. 35: Violin Sonata Op. 13 No. 2 in E major
- G. 36: Violin Sonata Op. 13 No. 3 in B♭ major
- G. 37: Violin Sonata Op. 13 No. 4 in E♭ major
- G. 38: Violin Sonata Op. 13 No. 5 in A major
- G. 39: Violin Sonata Op. 13 No. 6 in D major
- G. 40: Violin Sonata "Naderman" No. 1 in C major
- G. 41: Violin Sonata "Naderman" No. 2 in B♭ major
- G. 42: Violin Sonata "Naderman" No. 3 in D minor
- G. 43: Violin Sonata "Naderman" No. 4 in C minor
- G. 44: Violin Sonata "Naderman" No. 5 in B♭ major
- G. 45: Violin Sonata "Naderman" No. 6 in C minor
- G. 46: Violin Sonata Op. 33 No. 1 in C minor
- G. 47: Violin Sonata Op. 33 No. 2 in D major
- G. 48: Violin Sonata Op. 33 No. 3 in B♭ major
- G. 49: Violin Sonata Op. 33 No. 4 in A major
- G. 50: Violin Sonata Op. 33 No. 5 in E♭ major
- G. 51: Violin Sonata Op. 33 No. 6 in E major
- G. 52: Violin Sonata "Robinson" No. 1 in B♭ major
- G. 53: Violin Sonata "Robinson" No. 2 in E♭ major
- G. 54: Violin Sonata "Robinson" No. 3 in E major
- G. 55: Rondo for violin & harpsichord in G major
- G. 570: Violin Sonata in E♭ major

== Duets for violins ==
- G. 56: Violin Duet Op. 3 No. 1 in G major (1761)
- G. 57: Violin Duet Op. 3 No. 2 in F major
- G. 58: Violin Duet Op. 3 No. 3 in A major
- G. 59: Violin Duet Op. 3 No. 4 in B♭ major
- G. 60: Violin Duet Op. 3 No. 5 in E♭ major
- G. 61: Violin Duet Op. 3 No. 6 in D major
- G. 62: Violin Duet in E♭ major (c. 1766)
- G. 63: Violin Duet Op. 46 No. 1 in G major (1797)
- G. 64: Violin Duet Op. 46 No. 2 in E major
- G. 65: Violin Duet Op. 46 No. 3 in F minor
- G. 66: Violin Duet Op. 46 No. 4 in C major
- G. 67: Violin Duet Op. 46 No. 5 in E♭ major
- G. 68: Violin Duet Op. 46 No. 6 in D minor
- G. 69: Violin Duet in C major
- G. 70: Violin Duet in C major
- G. 71: Violin Duet in D major
- G. 72: 6 Violin Duets

== Duets for cellos ==
- G. 9: Sonata for 2 cellos in F major
- G. 73: 6 Fugues for 2 cellos
- G. 74: Sonata for 2 cellos in C major
- G. 75: Sonata for 2 cellos in E♭ major
- G. 76: 6 Duets from Quartets Op. 26, G. 195–200
- G. 571: Sonata for 2 cellos in D major
- G. 572: Sonata for 2 cellos in D major

== String trios ==
- G. 77: String Trio Op. 1 No. 1 in F major (1760)
- G. 78: String Trio Op. 1 No. 2 in B♭ major
- G. 79: String Trio Op. 1 No. 3 in A major
- G. 80: String Trio Op. 1 No. 4 in D major
- G. 81: String Trio Op. 1 No. 5 in G major
- G. 82: String Trio Op. 1 No. 6 in C major
- G. 83: String Trio Op. 4 No. 1 in E♭ major (1766)
- G. 84: String Trio Op. 4 No. 2 in B♭ major
- G. 85: String Trio Op. 4 No. 3 in E major
- G. 86: String Trio Op. 4 No. 4 in F minor
- G. 87: String Trio Op. 4 No. 5 in D major
- G. 88: String Trio Op. 4 No. 6 in F major
- G. 89: String Trio Op. 6 No. 1 in B♭ major (1769)
- G. 90: String Trio Op. 6 No. 2 in E♭ major
- G. 91: String Trio Op. 6 No. 3 in A major
- G. 92: String Trio Op. 6 No. 4 in F major
- G. 93: String Trio Op. 6 No. 5 in G minor
- G. 94: String Trio Op. 6 No. 6 in C major
- G. 95: String Trio Op. 14 No. 1 in F major (1772)
- G. 96: String Trio Op. 14 No. 2 in C minor
- G. 97: String Trio Op. 14 No. 3 in A major
- G. 98: String Trio Op. 14 No. 4 in D major
- G. 99: String Trio Op. 14 No. 5 in E♭ major
- G. 100: String Trio Op. 14 No. 6 in F major
- G. 101: String Trio Op. 34 No. 1 in F minor (1781)
- G. 102: String Trio Op. 34 No. 2 in G major
- G. 103: String Trio Op. 34 No. 3 in E♭ major
- G. 104: String Trio Op. 34 No. 4 in D major
- G. 105: String Trio Op. 34 No. 5 in C major
- G. 106: String Trio Op. 34 No. 6 in E major
- G. 107: String Trio Op. 47 No. 1 in A♭ major (1793) [Op.47 in Boccherini's autograph catalogue, published as Op.38]
- G. 108: String Trio Op. 47 No. 2 in G major
- G. 109: String Trio Op. 47 No. 3 in B♭ major
- G. 110: String Trio Op. 47 No. 4 in E♭ major
- G. 111: String Trio Op. 47 No. 5 in D major
- G. 112: String Trio Op. 47 No. 6 in F major
- G. 113: String Trio Op. 54 No. 1 in D major (1796)
- G. 114: String Trio Op. 54 No. 2 in G major
- G. 115: String Trio Op. 54 No. 3 in E♭ major
- G. 116: String Trio Op. 54 No. 4 in C major
- G. 117: String Trio Op. 54 No. 5 in D minor
- G. 118: String Trio Op. 54 No. 6 in A major
- G. 119: String Trio Op. 3 No. 1 in C major (doubtful)
- G. 120: String Trio Op. 3 No. 2 in A major
- G. 121: String Trio Op. 3 No. 3 in A major
- G. 122: String Trio Op. 3 No. 4 in D major
- G. 123: String Trio Op. 3 No. 5 in D major
- G. 124: String Trio Op. 3 No. 6 in E♭ major
- G. 125: String Trio Op. 7 No. 1 in C minor (spurious, attributed to Luigi Marescalchi)
- G. 126: String Trio Op. 7 No. 2 in D major
- G. 127: String Trio Op. 7 No. 3 in E♭ major
- G. 128: String Trio Op. 7 No. 4 in A major
- G. 129: String Trio Op. 7 No. 5 in B♭ major
- G. 130: String Trio Op. 7 No. 6 in F major
- G. 131: String Trio Op. 28 No. 1 in D major (spurious, attributed to Giuseppe Cambini)
- G. 132: String Trio Op. 28 No. 2 in E♭ major
- G. 133: String Trio Op. 28 No. 3 in C minor
- G. 134: String Trio Op. 28 No. 4 in A major
- G. 135: String Trio Op. 28 No. 5 in B♭ major
- G. 136: String Trio Op. 28 No. 6 in G major
- G. 137: String Trio in B♭ major
- G. 138: String Trio in F major
- G. 139: String Trio in G major
- G. 140: String Trio in E♭ major
- G. 141: String Trio in A major
- G. 142: String Trio in C major
- G. 577: String Trio in G major
- G. 578: String Trio in G major

== Piano trios ==
- G. 143: Piano Trio Op. 12 No. 1 in C major (c. 1780, doubtful)
- G. 144: Piano Trio Op. 12 No. 2 in E minor
- G. 145: Piano Trio Op. 12 No. 3 in E♭ major
- G. 146: Piano Trio Op. 12 No. 4 in D major
- G. 147: Piano Trio Op. 12 No. 5 in B♭ major
- G. 148: Piano Trio Op. 12 No. 6 in G minor
- G. 149: 3 Piano Trios. Oeuvre I
- G. 150: Piano Trio in D minor
- G. 151: Piano Trio in B♭ major
- G. 152: Piano Trio in D minor
- G. 153: Piano Trio in G minor
- G. 154: 3 Piano Trios. Oeuvre II

== Trio sonatas with flute(s) ==
- G. 155: 3 Flute Trios, Book I (lost)
- G. 156: 3 Flute Trios, Book II (lost)
- G. 157: Trio for 2 flutes & continuo in C major
- G. 158: Trio for 2 flutes & continuo in D major

== String quartets ==
- G. 159: String Quartet Op. 2 No. 1 in C minor (1761)
- G. 160: String Quartet Op. 2 No. 2 in B♭ major
- G. 161: String Quartet Op. 2 No. 3 in D major
- G. 162: String Quartet Op. 2 No. 4 in E♭ major
- G. 163: String Quartet Op. 2 No. 5 in E major
- G. 164: String Quartet Op. 2 No. 6 in C major
- G. 165: String Quartet Op. 8 No. 1 in D major (c. 1768)
- G. 166: String Quartet Op. 8 No. 2 in C minor
- G. 167: String Quartet Op. 8 No. 3 in E♭ major
- G. 168: String Quartet Op. 8 No. 4 in G minor
- G. 169: String Quartet Op. 8 No. 5 in F major
- G. 170: String Quartet Op. 8 No. 6 in A major
- G. 171: String Quartet Op. 9 No. 1 in C minor (1770)
- G. 172: String Quartet Op. 9 No. 2 in D minor
- G. 173: String Quartet Op. 9 No. 3 in F major
- G. 174: String Quartet Op. 9 No. 4 in E♭ major
- G. 175: String Quartet Op. 9 No. 5 in D major
- G. 176: String Quartet Op. 9 No. 6 in E major
- G. 177: String Quartet Op. 15 No. 1 in D major (1772)
- G. 178: String Quartet Op. 15 No. 2 in F major
- G. 179: String Quartet Op. 15 No. 3 in E major
- G. 180: String Quartet Op. 15 No. 4 in F major
- G. 181: String Quartet Op. 15 No. 5 in E♭ major
- G. 182: String Quartet Op. 15 No. 6 in C minor
- G. 183: String Quartet Op. 22 No. 1 in C major (1775)
- G. 184: String Quartet Op. 22 No. 2 in D major
- G. 185: String Quartet Op. 22 No. 3 in E♭ major
- G. 186: String Quartet Op. 22 No. 4 in B♭ major
- G. 187: String Quartet Op. 22 No. 5 in A minor
- G. 188: String Quartet Op. 22 No. 6 in C major
- G. 189: String Quartet Op. 24 No. 1 in D major (1776-8)
- G. 190: String Quartet Op. 24 No. 2 in A major
- G. 191: String Quartet Op. 24 No. 3 in E♭ major
- G. 192: String Quartet Op. 24 No. 4 in C major
- G. 193: String Quartet Op. 24 No. 5 in C minor
- G. 194: String Quartet Op. 24 No. 6 in G minor
- G. 195: String Quartet Op. 26 No. 1 in B♭ major (1778)
- G. 196: String Quartet Op. 26 No. 2 in G minor
- G. 197: String Quartet Op. 26 No. 3 in E♭ major
- G. 198: String Quartet Op. 26 No. 4 in A major
- G. 199: String Quartet Op. 26 No. 5 in F major
- G. 200: String Quartet Op. 26 No. 6 in F minor
- G. 201: String Quartet Op. 32 No. 1 in E♭ major (1780)
- G. 202: String Quartet Op. 32 No. 2 in E minor
- G. 203: String Quartet Op. 32 No. 3 in D major
- G. 204: String Quartet Op. 32 No. 4 in C major
- G. 205: String Quartet Op. 32 No. 5 in G minor
- G. 206: String Quartet Op. 32 No. 6 in A major
- G. 207: String Quartet Op. 33 No. 1 in E major (1781)
- G. 208: String Quartet Op. 33 No. 2 in C major
- G. 209: String Quartet Op. 33 No. 3 in G major
- G. 210: String Quartet Op. 33 No. 4 in B♭ major
- G. 211: String Quartet Op. 33 No. 5 in E minor
- G. 212: String Quartet Op. 33 No. 6 in E♭ major
- G. 213: String Quartet Op. 39 in A major (1787)
- G. 214: String Quartet Op. 41 No. 1 in C minor (1788)
- G. 215: String Quartet Op. 41 No. 2 in C major
- G. 216: String Quartet Op. 42 No. 1 in A major (1789)
- G. 217: String Quartet Op. 42 No. 2 in C major
- G. 218: String Quartet Op. 43 No. 1 in A major (1790)
- G. 219: String Quartet Op. 43 No. 2 in A major
- G. 220: String Quartet Op. 44 No. 1 in B♭ major (1792)
- G. 221: String Quartet Op. 44 No. 2 in E minor
- G. 222: String Quartet Op. 44 No. 3 in F major
- G. 223: String Quartet Op. 44 No. 4 in G major ("La tiranna")
- G. 224: String Quartet Op. 44 No. 5 in D major
- G. 225: String Quartet Op. 44 No. 6 in E♭ major
- G. 226: String Quartet Op. 48 No. 1 in F major (1794)
- G. 227: String Quartet Op. 48 No. 2 in A major
- G. 228: String Quartet Op. 48 No. 3 in B minor
- G. 229: String Quartet Op. 48 No. 4 in E♭ major
- G. 230: String Quartet Op. 48 No. 5 in G major
- G. 231: String Quartet Op. 48 No. 6 in C major
- G. 232: String Quartet Op. 52 No. 1 in C major (1795)
- G. 233: String Quartet Op. 52 No. 2 in D major
- G. 234: String Quartet Op. 52 No. 3 in G major
- G. 235: String Quartet Op. 52 No. 4 in F minor
- G. 236: String Quartet Op. 53 No. 1 in E♭ major (1796)
- G. 237: String Quartet Op. 53 No. 2 in D major
- G. 238: String Quartet Op. 53 No. 3 in C major
- G. 239: String Quartet Op. 53 No. 4 in A major
- G. 240: String Quartet Op. 53 No. 5 in C major
- G. 241: String Quartet Op. 53 No. 6 in E♭ major
- G. 242: String Quartet Op. 58 No. 1 in C major (1799)
- G. 243: String Quartet Op. 58 No. 2 in E♭ major
- G. 244: String Quartet Op. 58 No. 3 in B♭ major
- G. 245: String Quartet Op. 58 No. 4 in B minor
- G. 246: String Quartet Op. 58 No. 5 in D major
- G. 247: String Quartet Op. 58 No. 6 in E♭ major
- G. 248: String Quartet Op. 64 No. 1 in F major (1804)
- G. 249: String Quartet Op. 64 No. 2 in D major
- G. 250: String Quartet Op. 54 No. 1 in D major (1796, doubtful)
- G. 251: String Quartet Op. 54 No. 2 in G major
- G. 252: String Quartet Op. 54 No. 3 in C major
- G. 253: String Quartet Op. 54 No. 4 in A major
- G. 254: String Quartet Op. 54 No. 5 in C major
- G. 255: String Quartet Op. 54 No. 6 in D major
- G. 256: 6 String Quartets from Op. 10, G. 265–270 (doubtful)
- G. 257: 2 String Quartets from G. 287 & 290
- G. 258: String Quartet in F minor (lost)

== Piano quartets ==
- G. 259: 6 Piano Quartets from Quartets Op. 26, G. 195–200

== Flute quartets ==
- G. 260: 3 Flute Quartets Op. 5 from G. 369, 363 & 368
- G. 261: 6 Flute Quartets (arrangements lost)

== Wind quartets ==
- G. 262: Wind Quartets No. 1–3
- G. 263: Wind Quartets No. 4–6
- G. 264: Wind Quartets No. 7–9

== String quintets ==
- G. 265: String Quintet Op. 10 No. 1 in A major (1771)
- G. 266: String Quintet Op. 10 No. 2 in E♭ major
- G. 267: String Quintet Op. 10 No. 3 in C minor
- G. 268: String Quintet Op. 10 No. 4 in C major

String Quintet Op10 No5, third movement (G269)
Performed by Jacques Lochet, violin and synthesizer (2001)

- G. 269: String Quintet Op. 10 No. 5 in E♭ major
- G. 270: String Quintet Op. 10 No. 6 in D major

String Quintet Op11 No1, first movement (G271)
Performed by Jacques Lochet, violin and synthesizer (2001)

String Quintet Op11 No1, second movement (G271)
Performed by Jacques Lochet, violin and synthesizer (2001)

String Quintet Op11 No1, third movement (G271)
Performed by Jacques Lochet, violin and synthesizer (2001)

- G. 271: String Quintet Op. 11 No. 1 in B♭ major (1771)

String Quintet op.11 No 2, first movement (G272)
Performed by Jacques Lochet, violin and synthesizer (2001)

String Quintet op.11 No 2, second movement (G272)
Performed by Jacques Lochet, violin and synthesizer (2001)

String Quintet op.11 No 2, third movement (G272)
Performed by Jacques Lochet, violin and synthesizer (2001)

String Quintet op.11 No 2, fourth movement (G272)
Performed by Jacques Lochet, violin and synthesizer (2001)

- G. 272: String Quintet Op. 11 No. 2 in A major

String Quintet Op11 No3, first movement (G273)
Performed by Jacques Lochet, violin and synthesizer (2002)

String Quintet Op11 No3, second movement (G273)
Performed by Jacques Lochet, violin and synthesizer (2002)

String Quintet Op11 No3, third movement (G273)
Performed by Jacques Lochet, violin and synthesizer (2002)

String Quintet Op11 No3, fourth movement (G273)
Performed by Jacques Lochet, violin and synthesizer (2002)

- G. 273: String Quintet Op. 11 No. 3 in C major
- G. 274: String Quintet Op. 11 No. 4 in F minor
- G. 275: String Quintet Op. 11 No. 5 in E major (featured in The Ladykillers)
- G. 276: String Quintet Op. 11 No. 6 in D major

String Quintet op.13 No 1, first movement (G277)
Performed by Jacques Lochet, violin and synthesizer (2002)

String Quintet op.13 No 1, second movement (G277)
Performed by Jacques Lochet, violin and synthesizer (2002)

String Quintet op.13 No 1, third movement (G277)
Performed by Jacques Lochet, violin and synthesizer (2002)

String Quintet op.13 No 1, fourth movement (G277)
Performed by Jacques Lochet, violin and synthesizer (2002)

- G. 277: String Quintet Op. 13 No. 1 in E♭ major (1772)
- G. 278: String Quintet Op. 13 No. 2 in C major
- G. 279: String Quintet Op. 13 No. 3 in F major
- G. 280: String Quintet Op. 13 No. 4 in D minor
- G. 281: String Quintet Op. 13 No. 5 in A major
- G. 282: String Quintet Op. 13 No. 6 in E major

String Quintet op.18 No 1, first movement (G283)
Performed by Jacques Lochet, violin and synthesizer (2002)

String Quintet op.18 No 1, second movement (G283)
Performed by Jacques Lochet, violin and synthesizer (2002)

String Quintet op.18 No 1, third movement (G283)
Performed by Jacques Lochet, violin and synthesizer (2002)

String Quintet op.18 No 1, fourth movement (G283)
Performed by Jacques Lochet, violin and synthesizer (2002)

- G. 283: String Quintet Op. 18 No. 1 in C minor (1774)
- G. 284: String Quintet Op. 18 No. 2 in D major
- G. 285: String Quintet Op. 18 No. 3 in E♭ major
- G. 286: String Quintet Op. 18 No. 4 in C major
- G. 287: String Quintet Op. 18 No. 5 in D minor
- G. 288: String Quintet Op. 18 No. 6 in E major
- G. 289: String Quintet Op. 20 No. 1 in E♭ major (1775)
- G. 290: String Quintet Op. 20 No. 2 in B♭ major
- G. 291: String Quintet Op. 20 No. 3 in F major
- G. 292: String Quintet Op. 20 No. 4 in G major
- G. 293: String Quintet Op. 20 No. 5 in D minor
- G. 294: String Quintet Op. 20 No. 6 in A minor
- G. 295: String Quintet Op. 25 No. 1 in D minor (1778)
- G. 296: String Quintet Op. 25 No. 2 in E♭ major
- G. 297: String Quintet Op. 25 No. 3 in A major
- G. 298: String Quintet Op. 25 No. 4 in C major
- G. 299: String Quintet Op. 25 No. 5 in D major
- G. 300: String Quintet Op. 25 No. 6 in A minor

String Quintet op.27 No 1, first movement (G301)
Performed by Jacques Lochet, violin and synthesizer (November 2001)

String Quintet op.27 No 1, second movement (G301)
Performed by Jacques Lochet, violin and synthesizer (November 2001)

- G. 301: String Quintet Op. 27 No. 1 in A major (1779)
- G. 302: String Quintet Op. 27 No. 2 in G major

String Quintet op.27 No 3, first movement (G303)
Performed by Jacques Lochet, violin and synthesizer (October 2001)

String Quintet op.27 No 3, second movement (G303)
Performed by Jacques Lochet, violin and synthesizer (October 2001)

- G. 303: String Quintet Op. 27 No. 3 in E minor
- G. 304: String Quintet Op. 27 No. 4 in E♭ major
- G. 305: String Quintet Op. 27 No. 5 in G minor
- G. 306: String Quintet Op. 27 No. 6 in B minor
- G. 307: String Quintet Op. 28 No. 1 in F major (1779)
- G. 308: String Quintet Op. 28 No. 2 in A major
- G. 309: String Quintet Op. 28 No. 3 in E♭ major
- G. 310: String Quintet Op. 28 No. 4 in C major
- G. 311: String Quintet Op. 28 No. 5 in D minor
- G. 312: String Quintet Op. 28 No. 6 in B♭ major
- G. 313: String Quintet Op. 29 No. 1 in D major (1779)
- G. 314: String Quintet Op. 29 No. 2 in C minor
- G. 315: String Quintet Op. 29 No. 3 in F major
- G. 316: String Quintet Op. 29 No. 4 in A major
- G. 317: String Quintet Op. 29 No. 5 in E♭ major
- G. 318: String Quintet Op. 29 No. 6 in G minor
- G. 319: String Quintet Op. 30 No. 1 in B♭ major (1780)
- G. 320: String Quintet Op. 30 No. 2 in A minor
- G. 321: String Quintet Op. 30 No. 3 in C major
- G. 322: String Quintet Op. 30 No. 4 in E♭ major
- G. 323: String Quintet Op. 30 No. 5 in E minor
- G. 324: String Quintet Op. 30 No. 6 in C major ("Musica notturna delle strade di Madrid", featured in Master and Commander: The Far Side of the World)
- G. 325: String Quintet Op. 31 No. 1 in E♭ major (1780)
- G. 326: String Quintet Op. 31 No. 2 in G major
- G. 327: String Quintet Op. 31 No. 3 in B♭ major
- G. 328: String Quintet Op. 31 No. 4 in C minor
- G. 329: String Quintet Op. 31 No. 5 in A major
- G. 330: String Quintet Op. 31 No. 6 in F major
- G. 331: String Quintet Op. 36 No. 1 in E♭ major (1786)
- G. 332: String Quintet Op. 36 No. 2 in D major
- G. 333: String Quintet Op. 36 No. 3 in G major
- G. 334: String Quintet Op. 36 No. 4 in A minor
- G. 335: String Quintet Op. 36 No. 5 in G minor
- G. 336: String Quintet Op. 36 No. 6 in F major
- G. 337: String Quintet Op. 39 No. 1 in B♭ major (1787)
- G. 338: String Quintet Op. 39 No. 2 in F major
- G. 339: String Quintet Op. 39 No. 3 in D major
- G. 340: String Quintet Op. 40 No. 1 in A major (1788)
- G. 341: String Quintet Op. 40 No. 2 in D major
- G. 342: String Quintet Op. 40 No. 3 in D major
- G. 343: String Quintet Op. 40 No. 4 in C major
- G. 344: String Quintet Op. 40 No. 5 in E minor
- G. 345: String Quintet Op. 40 No. 6 in B♭ major
- G. 346: String Quintet Op. 41 No. 1 in E♭ major (1788)
- G. 347: String Quintet Op. 41 No. 2 in F major
- G. 348: String Quintet Op. 42 No. 1 in F minor (1789)
- G. 349: String Quintet Op. 42 No. 2 in C major
- G. 350: String Quintet Op. 42 No. 3 in B minor
- G. 351: String Quintet Op. 42 No. 4 in G minor
- G. 352: String Quintet Op. 43 No. 1 in E♭ major (1790)
- G. 353: String Quintet Op. 43 No. 2 in D major
- G. 354: String Quintet Op. 43 No. 3 in F major
- G. 355: String Quintet Op. 45 No. 1 in C minor (1792)
- G. 356: String Quintet Op. 45 No. 2 in A major
- G. 357: String Quintet Op. 45 No. 3 in B♭ major
- G. 358: String Quintet Op. 45 No. 4 in C major
- G. 359: String Quintet Op. 46 No. 1 in B♭ major (1793)
- G. 360: String Quintet Op. 46 No. 2 in D minor
- G. 361: String Quintet Op. 46 No. 3 in C major
- G. 362: String Quintet Op. 46 No. 4 in G minor
- G. 363: String Quintet Op. 46 No. 5 in F major
- G. 364: String Quintet Op. 46 No. 6 in E♭ major
- G. 365: String Quintet Op. 49 No. 1 in D major (1794)
- G. 366: String Quintet Op. 49 No. 2 in B♭ major
- G. 367: String Quintet Op. 49 No. 3 in E♭ major
- G. 368: String Quintet Op. 49 No. 4 in D minor
- G. 369: String Quintet Op. 49 No. 5 in E♭ major
- G. 370: String Quintet Op. 50 No. 1 in A major (1795)
- G. 371: String Quintet Op. 50 No. 2 in E♭ major
- G. 372: String Quintet Op. 50 No. 3 in B♭ major
- G. 373: String Quintet Op. 50 No. 4 in E major
- G. 374: String Quintet Op. 50 No. 5 in C major
- G. 375: String Quintet Op. 50 No. 6 in B♭ major
- G. 376: String Quintet Op. 51 No. 1 in E♭ major (1795)
- G. 377: String Quintet Op. 51 No. 2 in C minor
- G. 378: String Quintet in C major
- G. 379: String Quintet in E minor (from G. 407)
- G. 380: String Quintet in F major (from G. 408)
- G. 381: String Quintet in E♭ major (from G. 410)
- G. 382: String Quintet in A minor (from G. 412)
- G. 383: String Quintet in D major (from G. 411)
- G. 384: String Quintet in C major (from G. 409)
- G. 385: String Quintet in D minor (from G. 416)
- G. 386: String Quintet in E minor (from G. 417)
- G. 387: String Quintet in B♭ major (from G. 414)
- G. 388: String Quintet in A major (from G. 413)
- G. 389: String Quintet in E minor (from G. 415)
- G. 390: String Quintet in C major (from G. 418)
- G. 391: String Quintet Op. 60 No. 1 in C major (1801)
- G. 392: String Quintet Op. 60 No. 2 in B♭ major
- G. 393: String Quintet Op. 60 No. 3 in A major
- G. 394: String Quintet Op. 60 No. 4 in E♭ major (lost)
- G. 395: String Quintet Op. 60 No. 5 in G major
- G. 396: String Quintet Op. 60 No. 6 in E major
- G. 397: String Quintet Op. 62 No. 1 in C major (1802)
- G. 398: String Quintet Op. 62 No. 2 in E♭ major
- G. 399: String Quintet Op. 62 No. 3 in F major

String Quintet Op62 No4, first movement (G400)
Performed by Jacques Lochet, violin and synthesizer (2001)

String Quintet Op62 No4, second movement (G400)
Performed by Jacques Lochet, violin and synthesizer (2001)

String Quintet Op62 No4, third movement (G400)
Performed by Jacques Lochet, violin and synthesizer (2001)

String Quintet Op62 No4, fourth movement (G400)
Performed by Jacques Lochet, violin and synthesizer (2001)

- G. 400: String Quintet Op. 62 No. 4 in B♭ major
- G. 401: String Quintet Op. 62 No. 5 in D major
- G. 402: String Quintet Op. 62 No. 6 in E major
- G. 403: 6 String Quintets from Op. 10, G. 265–270
- G. 404: 6 String Quintets from Op. 11, G. 271–276
- G. 405: 6 String Quintets from Op. 18, G. 283–288
- G. 406: String Quintet in E♭ major (lost)

== Piano quintets ==
- G. 407: Piano Quintet Op. 56 No. 1 in E minor (1797)
- G. 408: Piano Quintet Op. 56 No. 2 in F major
- G. 409: Piano Quintet Op. 56 No. 3 in C major
- G. 410: Piano Quintet Op. 56 No. 4 in E♭ major
- G. 411: Piano Quintet Op. 56 No. 5 in D major
- G. 412: Piano Quintet Op. 56 No. 6 in A minor
- G. 413: Piano Quintet Op. 57 No. 1 in A major (1799)
- G. 414: Piano Quintet Op. 57 No. 2 in B♭ major
- G. 415: Piano Quintet Op. 57 No. 3 in E minor
- G. 416: Piano Quintet Op. 57 No. 4 in D minor
- G. 417: Piano Quintet Op. 57 No. 5 in E major
- G. 418: Piano Quintet Op. 57 No. 6 in C major

== Flute quintets ==
- G. 419: Flute Quintet Op. 17 No. 1 in D major (1773)
- G. 420: Flute Quintet Op. 17 No. 2 in C major
- G. 421: Flute Quintet Op. 17 No. 3 in D minor
- G. 422: Flute Quintet Op. 17 No. 4 in B♭ major
- G. 423: Flute Quintet Op. 17 No. 5 in G major
- G. 424: Flute Quintet Op. 17 No. 6 in E♭ major
- G. 425: Flute Quintet Op. 19 No. 1 in E♭ major (1774)
- G. 426: Flute Quintet Op. 19 No. 2 in G minor
- G. 427: Flute Quintet Op. 19 No. 3 in C major
- G. 428: Flute Quintet Op. 19 No. 4 in D major
- G. 429: Flute Quintet Op. 19 No. 5 in B♭ major
- G. 430: Flute Quintet Op. 19 No. 6 in D major
- G. 431: Flute Quintet Op. 55 No. 1 in G major (1797)
- G. 432: Flute Quintet Op. 55 No. 2 in F major
- G. 433: Flute Quintet Op. 55 No. 3 in D major
- G. 434: Flute Quintet Op. 55 No. 4 in A major
- G. 435: Flute Quintet Op. 55 No. 5 in E♭ major
- G. 436: Flute Quintet Op. 55 No. 6 in D minor
- G. 437: Flute Quintet with cello concertante No. 1 in F major
- G. 438: Flute Quintet with cello concertante No. 2 in G major
- G. 439: Flute Quintet with cello concertante No. 3 in C major
- G. 440: Flute Quintet with cello concertante No. 4 in D major
- G. 441: Flute Quintet with cello concertante No. 5 in G major
- G. 442: Flute Quintet with cello concertante No. 6 in B♭ major
- G. 443: Quintet for flute, oboe & strings in C major
- G. 444: Quintet for flute, oboe & strings in B♭ major

== Guitar quintets ==
The movements of the guitar quintets are wholly transcribed by the composer from earlier quintets (usually string or piano quintets).

- G. 445: Guitar Quintet No. 1 in D minor
- G. 446: Guitar Quintet No. 2 in E major
- G. 447: Guitar Quintet No. 3 in B♭ major
- G. 448: Guitar Quintet No. 4 in D major ("Fandango")
- G. 449: Guitar Quintet No. 5 in D major
- G. 450: Guitar Quintet No. 6 in G major
- G. 451: Guitar Quintet No. 7 in E minor
- G. 452: Guitar Quintet No. 8 in F major (lost)
- G. 453: Guitar Quintet No. 9 in C major ("La Ritirata di Madrid")

== Sextets ==
- G. 454: String Sextet Op. 23 No. 1 in E♭ major (1776)
- G. 455: String Sextet Op. 23 No. 2 in B♭ major
- G. 456: String Sextet Op. 23 No. 3 in E major
- G. 457: String Sextet Op. 23 No. 4 in F minor
- G. 458: String Sextet Op. 23 No. 5 in D major
- G. 459: String Sextet Op. 23 No. 6 in F major
- G. 460: String Sextet in D major [Not Boccherini. It is a work of Gaetano Brunetti L 267]
- G. 461: Divertimento Op. 16 No. 1 in A major (1773)
- G. 462: Divertimento Op. 16 No. 2 in F major
- G. 463: Divertimento Op. 16 No. 3 in A major
- G. 464: Divertimento Op. 16 No. 4 in E♭ major
- G. 465: Divertimento Op. 16 No. 5 in A major
- G. 466: Divertimento Op. 16 No. 6 in C major

== Octets ==
- G. 467: Notturno Op. 38 No. 1 in E♭ major (1787)
- G. 468: Notturno Op. 38 No. 2 in E♭ major (lost)
- G. 469: Notturno Op. 38 No. 3 in E♭ major (lost)
- G. 470: Notturno Op. 38 No. 4 in G major
- G. 471: Notturno Op. 38 No. 5 in E♭ major
- G. 472: Notturno Op. 38 No. 6 in B♭ major
- G. 473: Notturno Op. 42 in E♭ major (1789, lost)

== Cello concertos ==
- G. 474: Cello Concerto No. 1 in E♭ major
- G. 475: Cello Concerto No. 2 in A major
- G. 476: Cello Concerto No. 3 in G major
- G. 477: Cello Concerto No. 4 in C major
- G. 478: Cello Concerto No. 5 in D major
- G. 479: Cello Concerto No. 6 in D major
- G. 480: Cello Concerto No. 7 in G major
- G. 481: Cello Concerto No. 8 in C major
- G. 482: Cello Concerto No. 9 in B♭ major
- G. 483: Cello Concerto No. 10 in D major
- G. 484: Cello Concertino in D major
- G. 573: Cello Concerto No. 11 in C major
- G deest: Cello Concerto No. 12 in E♭ major

== Other concertos ==
- G. 485: Violin Concerto in G major
- G. 486: Violin Concerto in D major
- G. 487: Piano Concerto in E♭ major
- G. 488: Piano Concerto in C major (sketch)
- G. 489: Flute Concerto in D major (spurious), it is a work of František Xaver Pokorný
- G. 574: Violin Concerto in F major
- G. 575: Flute Concerto in D major

== Symphonies ==
- G. 490: Overture in D major (c. 1765, second movement related to G478)
- G. 491: Sinfonia concertante Op. 7 in C major (1769)
- G. 492: 6 Divertimenti (6 Sextets) Op. 16, G. 461–466 (1773)
- G. 493: Symphony Op. 21 No. 1 in B♭ major (1775)
- G. 494: Symphony Op. 21 No. 2 in E♭ major
- G. 495: Symphony Op. 21 No. 3 in C major
- G. 496: Symphony Op. 21 No. 4 in D major
- G. 497: Symphony Op. 21 No. 5 in B♭ major
- G. 498: Symphony Op. 21 No. 6 in A major
- G. 499: Sinfonia concertante in G major (= G470)
- G. 500: Symphony in D major (1767)
- G. 501: Serenade in D major
- G. 502: 2 Minuets
- G. 503: Symphony Op. 12 No. 1 in D major (1771)
- G. 504: Symphony Op. 12 No. 2 in E♭ major
- G. 505: Symphony Op. 12 No. 3 in C major
- G. 506: Symphony Op. 12 No. 4 in D minor ("La Casa del Diavolo")
- G. 507: Symphony Op. 12 No. 5 in B♭ major
- G. 508: Symphony Op. 12 No. 6 in A major
- G. 509: Symphony Op. 35 No. 1 in D major (1782)
- G. 510: Symphony Op. 35 No. 2 in E♭ major
- G. 511: Symphony Op. 35 No. 3 in A major
- G. 512: Symphony Op. 35 No. 4 in F major
- G. 513: Symphony Op. 35 No. 5 in E♭ major
- G. 514: Symphony Op. 35 No. 6 in B♭ major
- G. 515: Symphony Op. 37 No. 1 in C major (1786)
- G. 516: Symphony Op. 37 No. 2 in D major (1786, lost)
- G. 517: Symphony Op. 37 No. 3 in D minor (1787)
- G. 518: Symphony Op. 37 No. 4 in A major (1787)
- G. 519: Symphony Op. 41 in C minor (1788)
- G. 520: Symphony Op. 42 in D major (1789)
- G. 521: Symphony Op. 43 in D major (1790)
- G. 522: Symphony Op. 45 in D major (1792)
- G. 523: Symphony in C major
- G. 576: Symphony in G major

== Theatrical works ==
- G. 524: Cefalo e Procri (lost)
- G. 525: Un gioco di minuetto ballabili Op. 41
- G. 526: Ballet espagnol
- G. 527: Interlude to Picini's opera: La buona figliola
- G. 540: Clementina, zarzuela
- G. 541: Scene from 'Ines de Castro'
- G. 542: Aria for the opera "L'Almeria" (lost)

== Liturgical works ==
- G. 528: Missa solemnis Op. 59 (lost)
- G. 529: Kyrie in B♭ major
- G. 530: Gloria in F major
- G. 531: Credo in C major
- G. 532a: Stabat Mater for one voice in F minor (1781)
- G. 532b: Stabat Mater for three voices (Op. 61) in F major (1800)
- G. 533: Dixit Dominus in G major
- G. 534: Domine ad adjuvandum in G major
- G. 535: Christmas Cantata Op. 63 (lost)
- G. 536: Cantata for the feast of Saint Louis (fragment)
- G. 539: Villancicos al Nacimiento de Nuestro Señor Jesucristo (1783)
- G deest: Laudate pueri

== Oratorios ==
- G. 537: Gioas, re di Giuda (1767)
- G. 538: Giuseppe riconosciuto (1767)

== Cantata ==
- G. 543: La Confederazione dei Sabini con Roma

== Concert arias ==
- G. 544: Aria accademica No. 1 in E♭ major
- G. 545: Aria accademica No. 2 in B♭ major
- G. 546: Aria accademica No. 3 in G major
- G. 547: Aria accademica No. 4 in A major
- G. 548: Aria accademica No. 5 in D minor
- G. 549: Aria accademica No. 6 in D major
- G. 550: Aria accademica No. 7 in E♭ major
- G. 551: Aria accademica No. 8 in G major
- G. 552: Aria accademica No. 9 in C major
- G. 553: Aria accademica No. 10 in F major
- G. 554: Aria accademica No. 11 in A major
- G. 555: Aria accademica No. 12 in B♭ major
- G. 556: Aria accademica No. 13 in E major
- G. 557: Aria accademica No. 14 in B♭ major
- G. 558: Aria accademica No. 15 in E♭ major
- G. 559: Duetto accademico No. 1 in E♭ major
- G. 560: Duetto accademico No. 2 in F major
- G. 561: Duetto accademico No. 3 in E♭ major

== Sources ==
- Grove Music Online (subscription required)
- On-line catalog of works by Boccherini (in French)
- Gérard, Yves: Thematic, Bibliographical and Critical Catalogue of the Works of Luigi Boccherini (London, Oxford University Press, 1969, 716p.) ISBN 0-19-711616-7
- Boccherini's autograph catalogue, from Piquot (1851) and Boccherini y Calonje (1879)
