= François de Fossa =

French musician

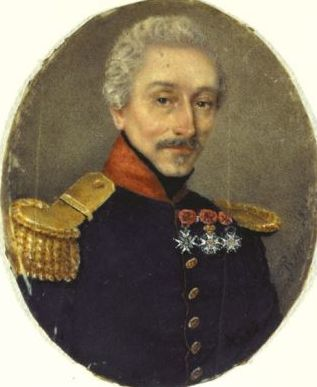
François de Fossa c. 1840

François de Fossa (full name: François de Paule Jacques Raymond de Fossa) (31 August 1775 – 3 June 1849) was a French classical guitarist and composer.

== Biography ==
His father, also named François de Fossa, was one of the most important historians of the province of Roussillon.

De Fossa was born in Perpignan, then in the Province of Roussillon. At age 17, he joined an army regiment, the Légion de Pyrénées, which fought the revolutionary government in France. for most of his life, he remained an army officer, also travelling to Mexico in the 1790s in this function.

A friend of Dionisio Aguado, he cooperated in his guitar method, also arranging its publication in Paris. He was also the copyist of Luigi Boccherini's well-known guitar quintets. In 1826, the Paris firm of Richault published de Fossa's three guitar quartets, opus 19. He died in Paris, aged 73.

== Works ==
- Recuerdo (c.1840)
- Three Grand Duos Based on the Works of Haydn
- Overture of the opera Didon of Piccinni, arranged for 2 guitars
- La Tyrolienne op. 1
- First Fantasie op. 5
- 12 Divertissements op. 6
- Third Fantasie on a theme of Beethoven op. 10
- Forth Fantasie Les Adieux a l'Espagne op. 11
- Fifth Fantasie on the air Les Follies d'Espagne op. 12
- 4 Divertissements op. 13
- Overture of the opera Elisabetta of Rossini, arranged for piano and guitar op. 14
- 12 Divertissements op. 15
- Trio Op. 18 No. 1 in A Major, for violin, guitar and cello. Movements: 1. Allegro non tanto; 2. Largo cantabile; 3. Minuetto: Poco presto; 4. Rondo: Allegretto.
- Trio Op. 18 No. 2 in G major, for violin, guitar and cello. Movements: 1. Allegro; 2. Adagio; 3. Minuetto: Allegretto; 4. Finale: Allegro.
- Trio Op. 18 No. 3 in F major, for violin, guitar and cello. Movements: 1. Allegro; 2. Romance: Andante sostenuto; 3. Minuetto: Allegro; 4. Finale: Allegro.
- Three Guitar Quartets op. 19
- 6 Divertissements for harpolyre op. 21

== Modern edition ==
- François de Fossa: Méthode complète pour la guitare by Dionisio Aguado y García (Geneva: Minkoff, 1980); ISBN 2-8266-0691-3, OCLC 7960184.

== Bibliography ==
- Matanya Ophee: Luigi Boccherini's Guitar Quintets, New Evidence; To which is added, for the first time, a reliable biography of François de Fossa, his portrait and a check list of his known compositions. Includes correspondence between Fossa and Louis Picquot in French with English translations (Boston: Éditions Orphée, 1981); ISBN 0-936186-06-2 (pbk.), ISBN 0-936186-06-2 (hbk.), OCLC 8954207.
- Jan de Kloe: François de Fossa's edition for guitar of Haydn works. Soundboard, vol 22 No 4, spring 1996.

== Sheet music ==
- Rischel & Birket-Smith's Collection of guitar music 1 Det Kongelige Bibliotek, Denmark
- Boije Collection The Music Library of Sweden
- Free scores by François de Fossa at the International Music Score Library Project (IMSLP)
