= Georges de Saint-Foix =

French musicologist and Mozart specialist

- Born: 2 March 1874; Paris
- Died: 26 May 1954 (aged 80); Aix-en-Provence
- Occupation: Musicologist

Georges de Saint-Foix (2 March 1874 – 26 May 1954) was a French musicologist, connoisseur of Mozart and specialist of the 19th century and the beginning of the 20th century.

He is the son of the Count of Saint-Foix of the same name, the very same one who in 1858 served as a guide to Gustave Flaubert in Carthage while he was preparing his novel Salammbô. A student at the Schola Cantorum of Paris, he studied the violin and music theory with Vincent D'Indy. A jurist by training, he became one of the most brilliant French musicologists of the first half of the twentieth by making himself known by his studies on Mozart, Cherubini, Bach, Clementi, Gluck and Boccherini.

Georges de Saint-Foix has been president of the French association of musicologists Société française de musicologie (1923-1925) and again (1929-1931).

== Main works ==
- W. A. Mozart : sa vie musicale et son œuvre de l'enfance à la pleine maturité, 1756-1777, essay of critical biography, with Théodore de Wyzewa.
- Georges de Saint-Foix; Picquot, Louis (1930). Boccherini : notes et documents nouveaux et Notice sur la vie et les ouvrages de Luigi Boccherini (in French). Paris: Librairie musicale R. Legouix. p. 203. OCLC 2901630. Saint-Foix1930.. Reissue of Louis Picquot's book, with a 45 pages introduction and updated annotations.
