= Symphony Op. 12 No. 4 (Boccherini) =

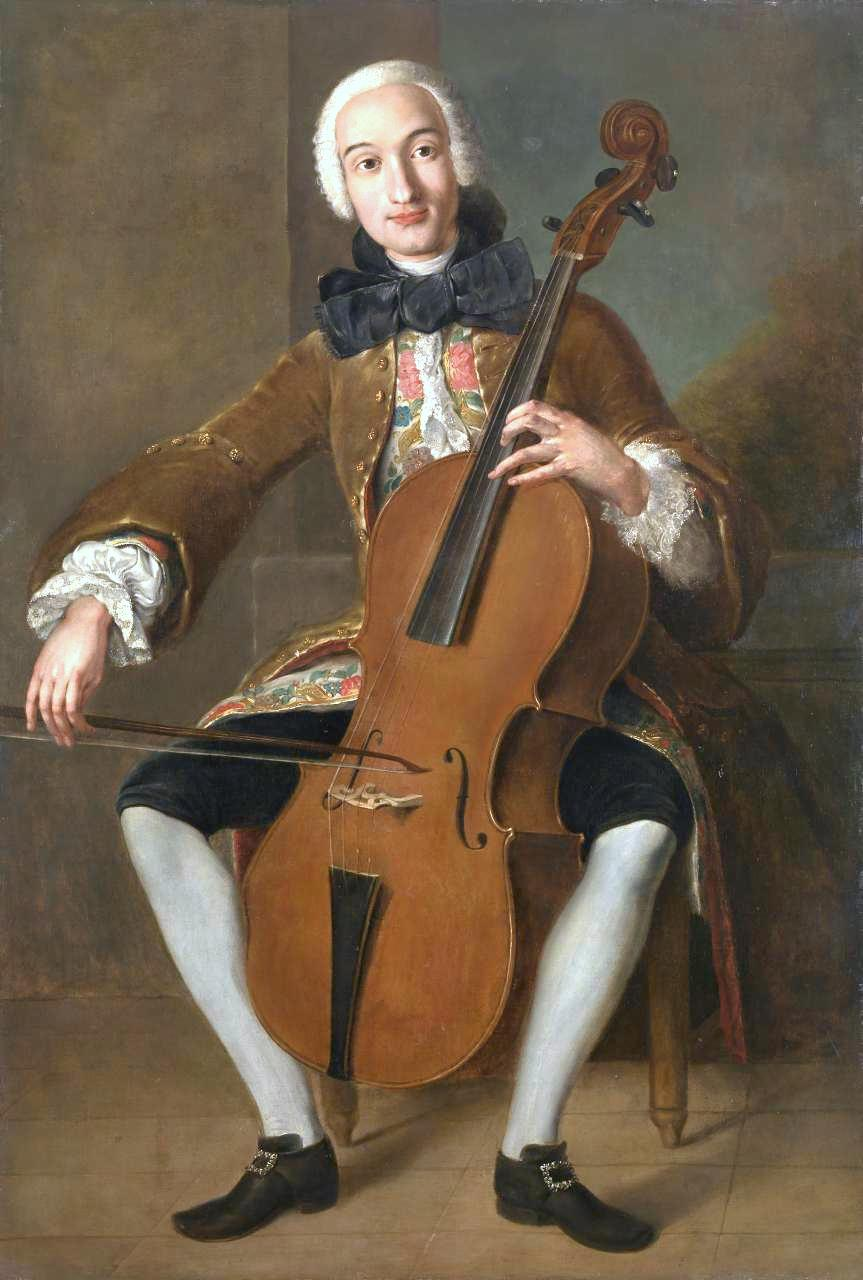
Luigi Boccherini

Luigi Boccherini's Symphony Op. 12 No. 4 in D minor is a symphony in three movements. Also known as La casa del Diavolo (lit. 'The Devil's House'). It was composed in 1771.

== Movements ==
The symphony has three movements:

1. Andante sostenuto - Allegro assai
2. Andantino con moto
3. Andante sostenuto (repetition of the 1st movement) – Allegro con molto

== Orchestration ==
flute - 2 oboes 2 bassoons

2 horns

strings

== See also ==
List of compositions by Luigi Boccherini
