= Louis Picquot =

Louis Picquot (1804 – 1870) was a 19th-century French musicographer, author of the first biography of Luigi Boccherini and a catalogue of Boccherini's works.

== Notice ==
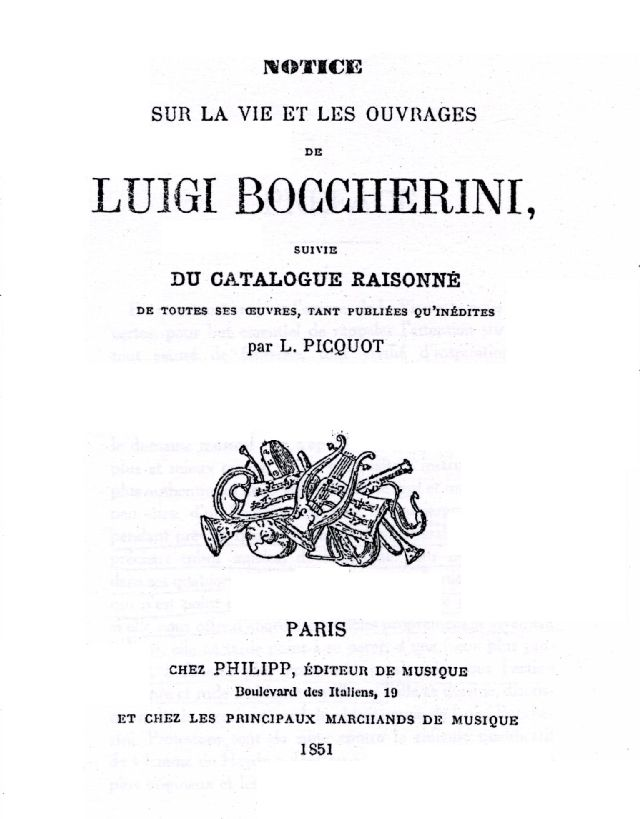
Title page of the Notice sur la vie et les ouvrages de Luigi Boccherini, suivie du catalogue raisonné de toutes ses œuvres, tant publiées qu'inédites, Paris, 1851.

Although Picquot had a job far from music - he was a tax collector in Bar-le-Duc - his work reached a general recognition among musicologists, musicians, music historians, publishers etc. In his patient compilation effort, Picquot contacted all those who may have information and documents about the composer, particularly François de Fossa (who played the Quintets with guitar), or the son, Josef Mariano and grandson Fernando, as well as his widow.

The 135-page book, published in 1851, was printed "at Philips, a publisher of music," with a long title, as was customary at the time, but at the same time modest, for he opted for the word "Notice" to describe it. For decades, Picquot's work was the core of Boccherinian studies, since it was far superior to the content of the Biographie universelle by Fétis. The book was reprinted only in 1930, by Georges de Saint-Foix (and a translation, in Spanish, with three context studies, in 2005). Georges de Saint-Foix, a musicologist, added a 45-page introduction, where he corrected many errors and added new data collected by other researchers or by himself.

Today, Picquot is still an important Boccherinian source, on condition of being aware of the inevitable gaps and errors and also of some blurred opinions. While studies of the musician have increased considerably, Picquot has "always a symbolic meaning". Yves Gérard thus comments on the book of Picquot in his catalog of works of Boccherini in 1969:

All subsequent works dealing with Boccherini have merely reproduced, borrowed or translated this fundamental work, which, despite certain shortcomings, must remain the starting point of any study by the Italian composer.

== Works ==
- 1851: Louis Picquot (1851). Notice sur la vie et les ouvrages de Luigi Boccherini, suivie du catalogue raisonné de toutes ses œuvres, tant publiées qu'inédites (in French). Paris: chez Philipp (=Camille Prilipp). pp. 135. OCLC 6996585.

== Bibliography ==
- Yves Gérard (1969). Thematic, Bibliographical and Critical Catalogue of the Works of Luigi Boccherini. London: Oxford University Press. p. 716.
- Matanya Ophee (1981). Luigi Boccherini's Guitar Quintets; New evidence, to which is added, for the first time, a reliable biography of François de Fossa, his portrait, and a checklist of his known compositions. Boston: Editions Orphée. p. 87. ISBN 0936186062. OCLC 8954207.
- (in English) Tortella, Jaime (2008). "Piquot, Louis". Luigi Boccherini : Diccionario de Términos, Lugares y Personas (pdf). Tempo di Minuetto (in Spanish). Madrid: Asociación Luigi Boccherini. pp. 323–325. ISBN 978-84-612-6846-7. OCLC 731149670. Tortella2008.
- (in English) Rudolf Rasch, A Note on Louis Picquot (1804-1870), Boccherini's First Biographer, in Christian, Speck, ed. (2014). Boccherini Studies (collective). Boccherini Studies (in German, Italian, English, and French). Bologne: Ut Orpheus Edizioni. pp. 331–348. ISBN 978-88-8109-486-8. OCLC 884275496. Speck2014.
