= Stabat Mater (Boccherini) =

The Stabat Mater is a musical setting of the Stabat Mater sequence, composed by Luigi Boccherini in 1781 (G. 532a) and revised in 1800 (G. 532b, Op. 61).

Boccherini (1743–1805) was a musician best known for chamber music (string quintets). His vocal work is played less often. He was married to a singer and wrote numerous religious works (including one mass, two motets and two oratorios).

== Structure ==
His Stabat Mater was commissioned in 1781 by the King of Spain's younger brother Luis of Spain, Count of Chinchón. It was conceived for a liturgical service at Palacio de la Mosquera, Arenas de San Pedro, where they were living. The text dates from the 13th century and is attributed to Jacopone da Todi which meditates on the suffering of Mary during the crucifixion of Jesus. The first version consisted of one soprano voice accompanied by a string quintet (two violins, one viola, two cellos). It consists of 11 parts and lasts around three-quarters of an hour. Boccherini revised it around twenty years later for three voices, adding another soprano and a tenor, and using the Allegro of his second symphony as an added overture. The definitive work is known as his Opus 61.

- Overture
1. "Stabat mater dolorosa", Grave assai
2. "Cujus animam gementem", Allegro
3. "Quae moerebat et dolebat", Allegretto con moto
4. "Quis est homo", Adagio assai – Recitativo
5. "Pro peccatis suae gentis", Allegretto
6. "Eja mater, fons amoris", Larghetto non tanto
7. "Tui nati vulnerati", Allegro vivo
8. "Virgo virginum praeclara", Andantino
9. "Fac ut portem Christi mortem", Larghetto
10. "Fac me plagis vulnerari", Allegro comodo
11. "Quando corpus morietur", Andante lento

== Bibliography ==
- Luca Lévi Sala, Édition critique du "Stabat Mater" de Luigi Boccherini, PhD dissertation, 2 vols., UFR Sciences Humaines et Arts, Université de Poitiers (France), 2012, pp. xxii-188+404.
- Luca Lévi Sala, Luigi Boccherini, Stabat Mater (2 versions) G 532, Bologna, Ut Orpheus Edizioni (Opera Omnia, Italian National Edition under the Direction of Christian Speck, pp. cxxxviii+190, ISMN 979-0-2153-2378-0, ISBN 978-88-8109-498-1.
- Luca Lévi Sala, Luigi Boccherini, Stabat Mater in F minor G 532 for Soprano, 2 Violins, Viola, Violoncello and Basso, Practical Edition, Bologna, Ut Orpheus Edizioni (PEB 37A), 2015, pp. x-91, ISMN 979-0-2153-2311-7.
- Luca Lévi Sala, "Le Stabat Mater (1781) de Luigi Boccherini : nouveaux témoignages sur le manuscrit M. 2103.3 B 65 de la Bibliothèque du Congrès de Washington", in Boccherini Studies: New Evidence, Christian Speck (ed.), Bologna, Ut Orpheus Edizioni, 2014 (BS, 4), pp. 95–117, ISBN 978-88-8109-486-8.
- Luca Lévi Sala, "Le manuscrit espagnol I-Li PI 233 du Stabat Mater Op. 61 de Luigi Boccherini : ce que les sources nous dissent", in Boccherini Studies: New Evidence, Christian Speck (ed.), Bologna, Ut Orpheus Edizioni, 2014 (BS, 4), pp. 119–139, ISBN 978-88-8109-486-8.
- Luca Lévi Sala, "Le Stabat Mater Op. 61 (1801) de Luigi Boccherini : genèse et état des sources", in Revue de musicologie, vol. 100 (2014/2), Paris, Société française de musicologie, pp. 323–356, ISSN 0035-1601.
- Luca Lévi Sala, "Deux manuscrits inconnus du Stabat Mater Op. 61 de Luigi Boccherini", in Quatre siècles d’édition musicale. Mélanges offerts à Jean Gribenski (Études de Musicologie/Musicological Studies 5), Joann Élart, Etienne Jardin and Patrick Taïeb (eds.), Basel, Peter Lang, 2014, pp. 147–155, ISBN 978-2-87574-212-4.
- Luca Lévi Sala, "Le fonti secondarie francesi dello Stabat Mater Op. 61 di Luigi Boccherini: due manoscritti inediti", in Die Wiener Klassiker und das Italien ihrer Zeit, Petra Weber (ed.), Munich, Fink, 2015, pp. 217–226, ISBN 978-3-7705-5875-9.

== Discography ==
- Stabat Mater, (1781 G. 532 version), Barbara Vignudelli (soprano), Flavio Emilio Scogna (conductor), Benedetto Marcello Chamber Orchestra, Tactus TC 740208, 2006.
- Stabat Mater – Ensemble symposium, Francesca Boncompagni (2016, Brilliant Classics, 95356). Performance based on the Critical Edition prepared by Luca Lévi Sala (Bologna: Ut Orpheus, 2015).
- Stabat Mater – Roberta Invernizzi, L'Archibudelli (2003, Sony SK 89 926)
- Stabat Mater (1781 version) – Agnès Melon (soprano), Ensemble 415, Dir. Chiara Banchini (1992, Harmonia Mundi HM 901378)
- Stabat Mater – Isabel Rey (soprano), JONDE, dir. Riccardo Frizza, DECCA
- "Stabat Mater" Adelina Scarabelli (soprano) Solisti dell'Opera da Camera di Roma Federico Amendola ( 1990 NUOVA ERA)
