= Quattro versioni originali della "Ritirata notturna di Madrid" =

1975 composition by Luciano Berio

- by Luciano Berio
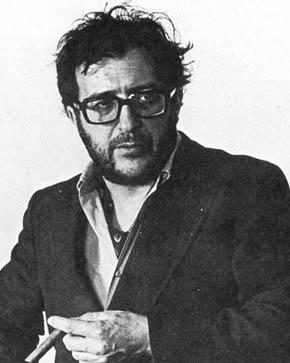
- Luciano Berio, at the time of the composition.
- Composed: 1975: Rome
- Published: 1977: Milan
- Scoring: Orchestra

Quattro versioni originali della "Ritirata notturna di Madrid" is an arrangement by Luciano Berio of a movement from Luigi Boccherini's Musica notturna delle strade di Madrid. The full title of the composition is Quattro versioni originali della "Ritirata notturna di Madrid" di Luigi Boccherini, sovrapposte e transcritte per orchestra (Four Original Versions from Luigi Boccherini's "Withdrawal by Night in Madrid", superimposed and transcribed for orchestra). This arrangement was composed in 1975.

== Composition ==
Luciano Berio received a commission by La Scala Theatre Orchestra in 1975, in which Berio was asked to write a short piece that would serve as an opening composition. Berio decided that he could arrange a movement from Boccherini's Musica notturna delle strade di Madrid, which is also called the Ritirata notturna di Madrid. At the time, up to four different versions of the same movement were known, as Boccherini originally arranged them for various musical forces. Berio decided to superimpose them with minor alterations to create a stratified sound structure.

This was not the first time that Berio came to the spotlight for arranging or transcribing pieces of other composers, given that a fair part of Berio's success as a composer came because he usually worked on adaptations and arrangements not only of compositions by other classical composers, but also of his own compositions, as he did with Rendering, the finale of Puccini's Turandot, and some of Berio's Sequenzas, which were later reworked into Chemins.

The piece was finished in 1975 in Rome and was dedicated to Davide Bellugi. It was later published by Universal Edition in 1977.

== Structure ==
The composition is in only one movement and takes 6 to 7 minutes to perform. However, it is in a theme and variations form. The whole piece can be structured into one initial introductory section, in which a solo second violin and the drums indicate the ostinato rhythm, the theme, and eleven variations in which the melodies are further developed, which are followed by a final coda. These sections are not separated, but the variations are marked in the original score as such.

The composition is scored for a large orchestra, consisting of three flutes, two oboes, one English horn, two clarinets in B-flat, one bass clarinet in B-flat, two bassoons, one contrabassoon, four French horns in F, four trumpets in C, three trombones, one bass tuba, timpani, a percussion section consisting of three percussionists playing two snare drums, one bass drum and one triangle, harp and a full string section. The composition is at a steady tempo of ♩ = 72, marked in the initial bar of the score, and totals 216 bars.

== Recordings ==
- The Joven Orquesta Nacional de España recorded the piece under the baton of José Luis Temes under Verso. It was recorded between June and September 2004 in the Teatro Circo de Albacete.
- The Orchestra Sinfonica di Milano Giuseppe Verdi also recorded this arrangement with Riccardo Chailly under Universal Classics, which was released by Decca. The recording took place in August 2004 in the Auditorium di Milano Fondazione Cariplo.
- The Finnish Radio Symphony Orchestra with Hannu Lintu also performed the piece under Ondine, which was recorded in January 2014. The piece was performed in the Helsinki Music Centre.
