= Musica notturna delle strade di Madrid =

String quintet by Luigi Boccherini

- String quintet by Luigi Boccherini
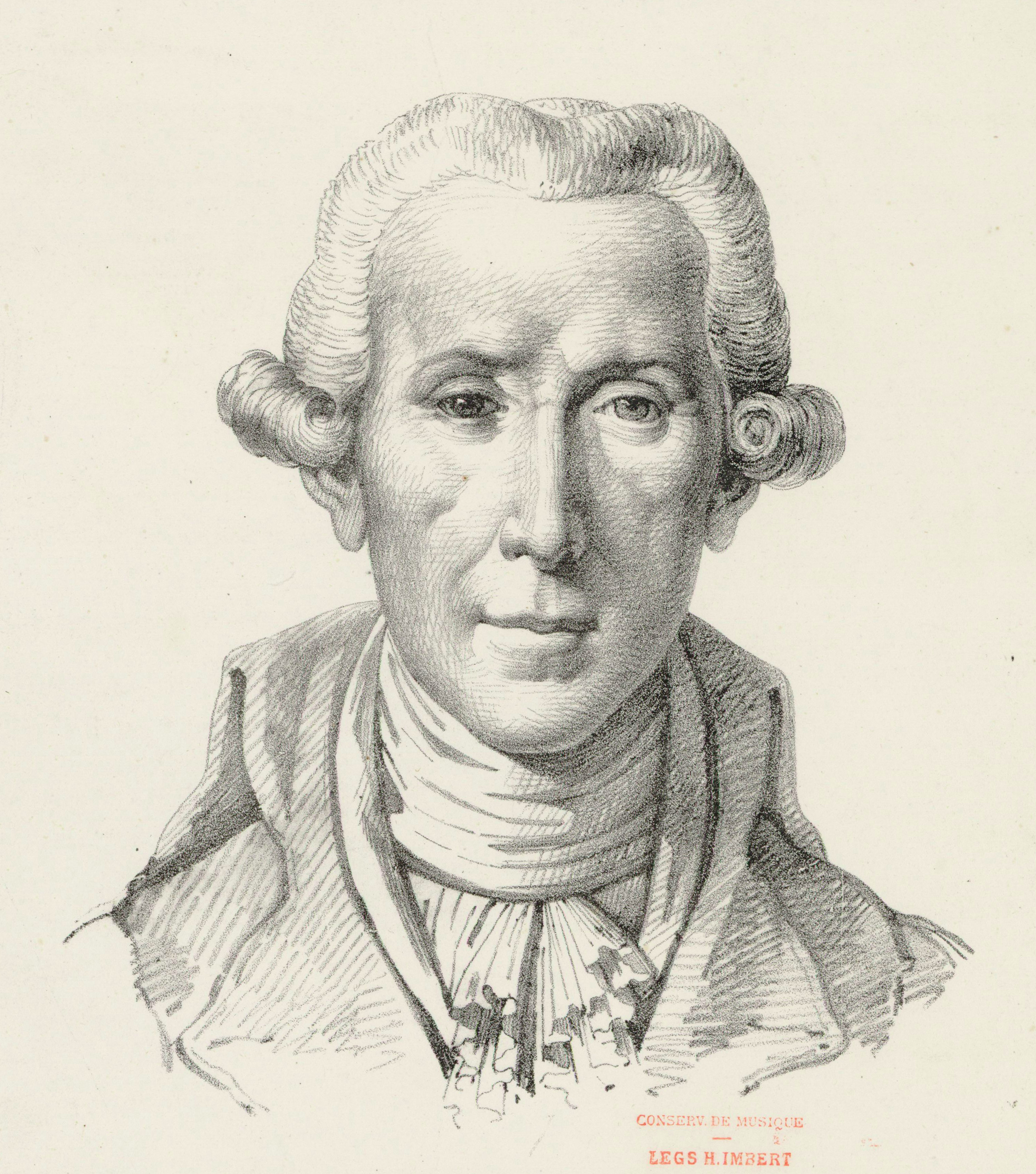
- Luigi Boccherini
- Key: C major
- Catalogue: G. 324
- Opus: 30/6
- Genre: Classical music
- Composed: 1780
- Movements: 7
- Scoring: Five stringed instruments

Musica notturna delle strade di Madrid (Night Music of the Streets of Madrid), Opus 30 No. 6 (G. 324), is a quintettino (quintet) for stringed instruments (ca. 1780), by Luigi Boccherini, the Italian composer in service to the Spanish Court from 1768 to 1785.

== Background ==
The Italian composer Luigi Boccherini was attached to the Court of the Spanish Infante, Luis Antonio (1727–85), brother of King Charles III of Spain (1759–88). For having married a common citizen, King Charles exiled the Infante from the Madrid Court to the Arenas de San Pedro palace in Ávila province. As a courtier of Luis Antonio, Boccherini joined the exile, and found himself with much time for composition, and there completed more than one hundred pieces.

Musica notturna delle strade di Madrid describes the bustling streets of night-time Madrid; about the composition, critic Jaume Tortella writes:

"Taking its inspiration from nocturnal street scenes of Madrid, it seems to look back nostalgically to the gaiety and bustle of Spain's capital, recalling the sound of the city's church bells ringing for evening prayer, the popular dances that were the delight of its young people, and the blind beggars singing their typical viellas de rueda until the soldiers from the local garrison sound the midnight curfew with their Retreat."

While Tortella interprets Boccherini's work as a programmatic representation of Madrid's nightlife, Dutch conductor Dick van Gasteren believes that the work should above all be interpreted symbolically. Van Gasteren analyzed the work by analogy with iconography and came across countless references to politics, religion, visual arts, theater and love. He showed that the work with the technique of soggetto cavato and other symbolism contains references to, or is a serenade to, a secret love, the actress Maria del Rosario nicknamed La Tirana.

The composition was famous in Spain during Boccherini's life; the best-known versions are arrangements of the Ritirata (Retreat) movement incorporated to the (G418) piano quintet, and the (G453) guitar quintet. The Night Music of the Streets of Madrid was published years after Boccherini's death, because, he told his publisher: "The piece is absolutely useless, even ridiculous, outside Spain, because the audience cannot hope to understand its significance, nor the performers to play it as it should be played."

Since the mid-twentieth-century revival of interest in the music of Luigi Boccherini, the Ritirata became well-known; Luciano Berio used it as the basis for a composition superimposing the four known settings of the Ritirata, all playing concurrently, ebbing and flowing synchronously and asynchronously. Despite its slightly jokey nature, like Berio's folk-song settings, his Ritirata interpretation is attractive and approachable, acknowledging and expanding upon Boccherini's composition.

In 1975, the Boccherini Quintet, on the Ensayo record label, recorded an exceptional interpretation of Musica notturna delle strade di Madrid, that in 1976 won the Grand Prix du Disque, by the Académie Charles Cros.

== Instrumentation ==
Composed for two violins, a viola, and two cellos, the Night Music of the Streets of Madrid quintet is in the C major key, and is approximately 13 minutes in duration.

== Movements ==
Musica notturna delle strade di Madrid comprises these movements:

1. Le campane de l'Ave Maria – The Ave Maria Bell; the main church calls the faithful for the Ave Maria prayers.
2. Il tamburo dei Soldati – The Soldiers' drum.
3. Minuetto dei Ciechi – The Minuet of the Blind Beggars; Boccherini directed the cellists to place their instruments upon their knees, and strum them, like guitars.
4. Il Rosario (Largo assai, allegro, largo come prima) – The Rosary, a slow section not played in strict time.
5. Passa Calle (Allegro vivo) – The Passacaglia of the Street Singers, known as Los Manolos, lower-class loudmouths; not a true passacaglia, yet imitates their singing. In Spanish, pasacalle denotes "pass along the street", singing as one seeks amusement.
6. Il tamburo – The drum.
7. Ritirata (Maestoso) – The retreat of the Madrid military night watch; the Watch's patrol, announcing the curfew, and closing the streets for the night.

== Arrangements ==
- In 1975, Luciano Berio composed Quattro versioni originali della "Ritirata notturna di Madrid", an arrangement of the last movement of this composition.

== Popular culture ==
- The girlfriend of an undercover policeman plays a recording of Musica notturna delle strade di Madrid in the film Cruising (1980).
- The "Passa calle" was played in the opening of Barcelona 1992 Summer Olympic Games.
- The 2003 film Master and Commander: The Far Side of the World uses the main violin theme from Musica notturna delle strade di Madrid extensively. Russell Crowe as captain of the Surprise, and Paul Bettany as his ship's surgeon, play violin and cello in the captain's quarters for their own entertainment.
- The "Passa calle" is featured in the ending scene of the British 2004 television film Sherlock Holmes and the Case of the Silk Stocking.
- The "Passa calle" is featured in the opening scene and continued as a theme throughout season 3 episode of The Good Wife "Alienation of Affection".
- Passa Calle is featured during a ballroom dance in a season 2 episode of the Masterpiece series Sanditon on PBS. (2022)
