= Yves Gérard =

French musicologist (1932–2020)

- Born: Yves-René-Jean Gérard; 6 January 1932; Châlons-sur-Marne, France
- Died: 6 October 2020 (aged 88); Paris, France
- Occupations: Professor, musicologist
- Notable work: Luigi Boccherini; Saint-Saëns et l'Opéra de Monte-Carlo

Yves-René-Jean Gérard (6 January 1932 – 6 October 2020) was a French musicologist.

== Life and career ==
Born on 6 January 1932 in Châlons-sur-Marne, Yves Gérard studied philosophy at the Nancy-Université from 1949 to 1955. Following his graduation, he studied the piano for three years at the Nancy Conservatory. From 1955 to 1956 he studied at the Sorbonne under composer, musicologist and theoretician Jacques Chailley. At the Conservatoire de Paris he studied music history, musicology and aesthetics. In 1956, he won first prize for music history, and in 1958 for aesthetics. He succeeded his teacher, Norbert Dufourcq, as professor of music history and musicology at the Conservatoire in 1975, and retained this post until he retired in 1997. From 1979 to 1982, Gérard served as president of the French Association of Musicologists (fr:Société française de musicologie), and he was the French representative to the International Musicological Society from 1982 until 1992. Gérard taught at Laval University as visiting professor from 1984 to 1986, and the University of Maryland in 1987.

Gérard is known especially for his scholarly works on the composers Luigi Boccherini and Camille Saint-Saëns. He also made significant contributions to the study of the chamber music of late-18th century Italy, Spain, and Austria, and to French music of the 18th, 19th and 20th centuries. The Grove Dictionary of Music and Musicians writes that his major work was on the writings of Hector Berlioz. In 1983 he co-edited volume 4 of Berlioz's Correspondance générale, and in 1996 he co-edited Volume 1 of the composer's Critique musicale.

Gérard died of cancer on 6 October 2020, aged 88.

== Selected writings ==
=== Writings ===
- "L'Art pour la beauté: Samson et Dalila de Saint-Saëns", La Musique française, de Berlioz à Debussy (Paris, 1991), 25–32
- "La Bibliothèque musicale d'un amateur éclairé de Madrid: la duchesse-comtesse de Benavente, duchesse d'Osuna (1752–1834)", RMFC, iii (1963), 179–8.
- "Luigi Boccherini", Einzeldrucke vor 1800, RISM, A/I/i (1971), pp. 322–349.
- "Luigi Boccherini and Madame Sophie Gail", The Consort, xxiv (1967), 294–309
- "Notes sur la fabrication de la viole de gambe et la manière d'en jouer d'après une correspondance inédite de Jean-Baptiste Forqueray au Prince Frédéric-Guillaume de Prusse", RMFC, ii (1961–2), pp. 165–172.
- "L'œuvre de Saint-Saëns: éclats et ombres de la célébrité", 150 ans de musique française: Lyons 1991, 97–103
- "Le Rossignol: le paradoxe des codes détournés", Stravinsky-Schoenberg (Paris, 1997), pp. 52–58.
- "Saint-Saëns et l'Opéra de Monte-Carlo", L'Opéra de Monte-Carlo au temps du prince Albert Ier de Monaco, ed. J.M. Nectoux (Paris, 1990), pp. 29–36.
- Thematic, Bibliographical and Critical Catalogue of the Works of Luigi Boccherini (London, 1969).

=== As editor ===
- C. Saint-Saëns: regards sur mes contemporains (Arles, 1990)
- Le Conservatoire de Paris, 1795–1995: des Menus-Plaisirs à la Cité de la Musique (Paris, 1996), (with A. Bongrain and M.-H. Coudroy-Saghai)
- Hector Berlioz: correspondance générale, iv (Paris, 1983), (with P. Citron and H. Macdonald)
- Hector Berlioz: la critique musicale, 1823–1863 (Paris, 1996–), (with H.R. Cohen)
- Lettres de Henri Duparc à Ernest Chausson, RdM, xxxviii (1956), pp. 125–146.
- Lettres de compositeurs à Camille Saint-Saëns (Lyon, 2009), (with Eurydice Jousse)

=== Musical editions ===
- Luigi Boccherini: Sei Quintetti con Chitarra (Paris, 1974)

== Bibliography ==
- Blay, P. and R. Legrand (editors). Sillages musicologiques: hommages à Yves Gérard (Paris, 1997)
- Mussat, M.-C., J. Mongrédien and J.-M. Nectoux (editors). Echos de France et d’Italie: liber amicorum Yves Gérard (Paris, 1997)
- Spieth-Weissenbacher, Christiane; Jean Gribenski. ""Gérard, Yves(-René-Jean)"". Grove Music Online. (subscription access)
