= Luigi Boccherini =

Italian composer and cellist (1743–1805)

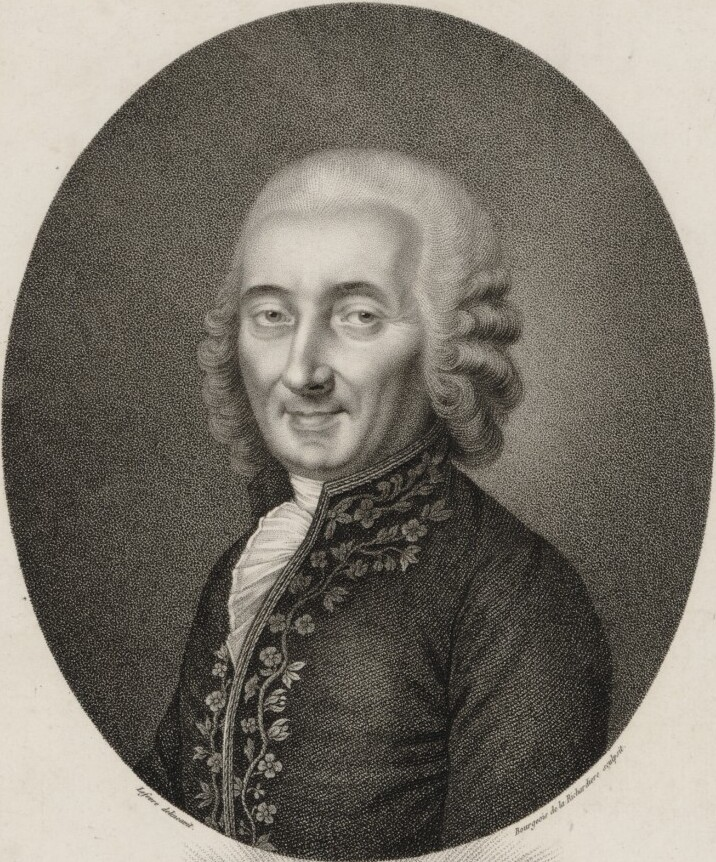
- Born: Ridolfo Luigi Boccherini; 19 February 1743; Lucca, Republic of Lucca
- Died: 28 May 1805 (aged 62); Madrid, Kingdom of Spain
- Occupations: Composer; Cellist
- Works: List of compositions

Signature
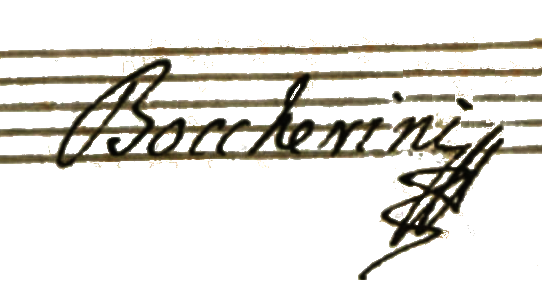

Ridolfo Luigi Boccherini (/ˌbɒkəˈriːni/, also US: /ˌboʊk-/; Italian: [riˈdɔlfo luˈiːdʒi bokkeˈriːni]; 19 February 1743 – 28 May 1805) was an Italian composer and cellist of the Classical era whose music retained a courtly and galante style even while he matured somewhat apart from the major classical musical centers. He is best known for the minuet from his String Quintet in E, Op. 11, No. 5 (G 275), and the Cello Concerto in B♭ major (G 482). The latter work was long known in the heavily altered version by German cellist and prolific arranger Friedrich Grützmacher, but has recently been restored to its original version. He is also particularly well known for his Musica notturna delle strade di Madrid (Night Music of the Streets of Madrid).

Boccherini's output also includes several guitar quintets. The final movement of the Guitar Quintet No. 4 in D (G 448) is a fandango, a lively Spanish dance.

== Biography ==
Boccherini was born into a musical family in Lucca, Italy in 1743. He was the third child of Leopoldo Boccherini, a cellist and double-bass player, and the brother of Giovanni Gastone Boccherini, a poet and dancer who wrote libretti for Antonio Salieri and Joseph Haydn. Luigi received his first music lessons at age five from his father, who taught him cello, and then continued his studies at age nine with Abbé Vanucci, music director of a local cathedral, at San Martino. When his son reached thirteen, Leopoldo Boccherini sent him to study in Rome with Giovanni Battista Costanzi. In 1757 Luigi Boccherini and his father both went to Vienna, where the court employed them as musicians in the Burgtheater.

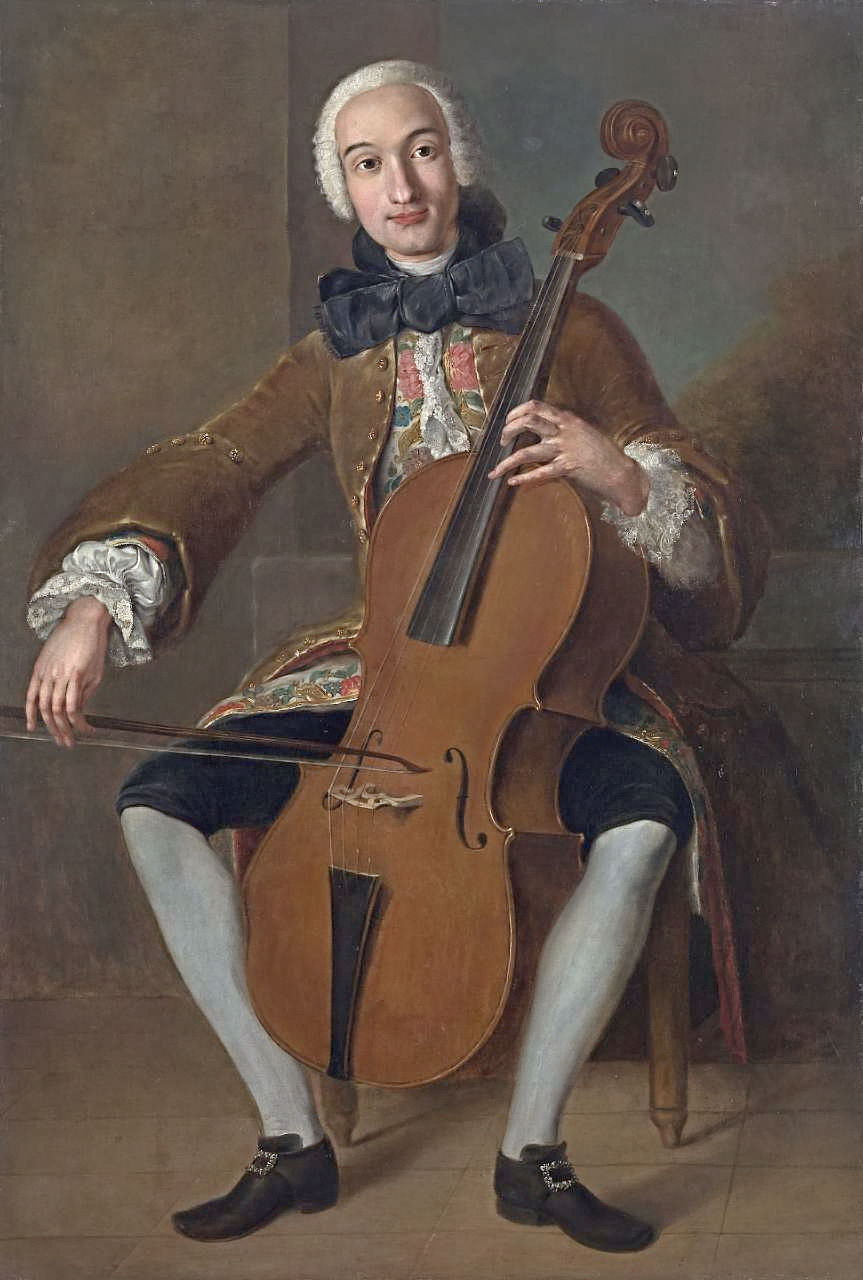
Boccherini playing the cello, by Pompeo Batoni

In 1768 Boccherini went to Madrid, entering in 1770 the employ of Infante Luis Antonio of Spain (1727–1785), younger brother of King Charles III of Spain. There, Boccherini flourished under royal patronage, until one day when the King expressed his disapproval at a passage in a new trio, and ordered Boccherini to change it. The composer, no doubt irritated with this intrusion into his art, doubled the passage instead, which led to his immediate dismissal. Then he accompanied Don Luis (the Infante) to Arenas de San Pedro, a little town in the Gredos Mountains in Ávila; there and in the nearest town of Candeleda Boccherini wrote many of his most famous works.

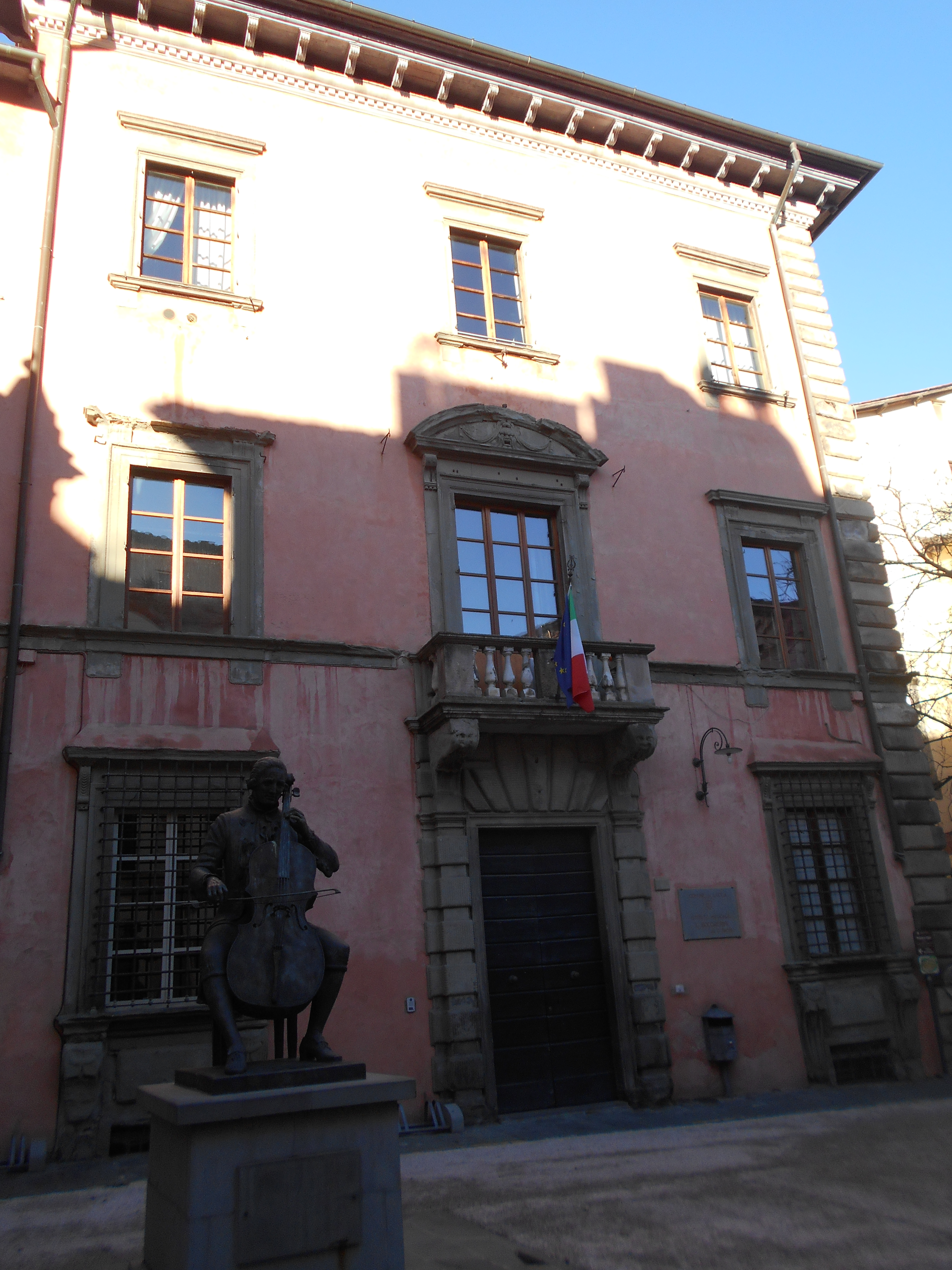
Monument to Boccherini, Lucca

Later patrons included the French ambassador to Spain, Lucien Bonaparte (1775–1840), as well as King Friedrich Wilhelm II of Prussia (1744–1797), himself an amateur cellist, flutist, and avid supporter of the arts. Boccherini fell on hard times following the deaths of his Spanish patron (1785), his two wives (1785 and 1805), and his four daughters (1796, 1802 and 1804). He died in Madrid in 1805, survived by two sons. His body lay buried in the Pontifical Basilica of St. Michael in Madrid until 1927, when his remains were repatriated and buried in the church of San Francesco in his native Lucca.

== Works ==
Much of Boccherini's chamber music follows models established by Joseph Haydn; however, Boccherini is often credited with improving Haydn's model of the string quartet by bringing the cello to prominence, whereas Haydn had frequently relegated it to an accompaniment role. Some sources for Boccherini's style are in the works of a famous Italian cellist, Giovanni Battista Cirri, who was born before Boccherini and before Haydn.

A virtuoso cellist, Boccherini often played violin repertoire on the cello, at pitch, a skill he developed by substituting for ailing violinists while touring. This supreme command of the instrument brought him much praise from his contemporaries (notably Pierre Baillot, Pierre Rode, and Bernhard Romberg), and is evident in the cello parts of his compositions (particularly in the quintets for two cellos, treated often as cello concertos with string quartet accompaniment).

He wrote a large amount of chamber music, including over one hundred string quintets for two violins, viola and two cellos (a type which he pioneered, in contrast with the then common scoring for two violins, two violas and one cello), a dozen guitar quintets, not all of which have survived, nearly a hundred string quartets, and a number of string trios and sonatas (including at least 19 for the cello). His orchestral music includes around 30 symphonies and 12 virtuoso cello concertos.

Boccherini's works have been catalogued by the French musicologist Yves Gérard (1932–2020) in the Gérard catalog, published in London (1969), hence the "G" numbers applied to his output.

Boccherini's style is characterized by Rococo charm, lightness, and optimism, and exhibits much melodic and rhythmic invention, coupled with frequent influences from the guitar tradition of his adopted country, Spain.

== Recordings ==
- Complete Symphonies, Vol. I–VII, Deutsche Kammerakademie Neuss, Johannes Goritzki, CPO 999401-2
- Cello Concertos, Enrico Bronzi, Accademia I Filarmonici di Verona, Brilliant Classics 92618 (2005)
- Complete Flute Quintets, Vol. I–III, Rafael Ruibérriz de Torres, Francisco de Goya String Quartet, Brilliant Classics 96074 (2021)
- Early Italian String Quartets, String Quartet in C minor, op. 1 No. 2, Butter Quartet
- Guitar Quintets, Vol. I–III, Zoltán Tokos, Danubius String Quartet, Naxos 8.503255
- String Quintets, Vol. I–X, La Magnifica Comunita, Enrico Casazza, violin, Brilliant Classics 92503, 92889, 93076, 93346, 93566, 93820, 93744, 94002, 93977, 94961 (2005–2011)

Boccherini's music is heard in the 2003 feature film Master and Commander: The Far Side of the World, including the little known Passa Calle, from La Musica Notturna di Madrid.

== Media ==
String Trio Op. 6 No. 4
First movement

Second movement

Third movement

String Quintet Op. 18 No. 4, first movement

String Quintet Op. 30 No. 1
First movement

Second and last movement

String Quintet Op. 30 No. 2
First movement

Second and last movement

String Quintet Op. 30 No. 3
First movement

Second and last movement

String Quintet Op. 30 No. 4
First movement

Second and last movement

String Quintet Op. 30 No. 5
First movement

Second and last movement

String Quintet Op. 31 No. 3
First movement

Second movement

Third movement

Fourth movement

(All performed by Jacques Lochet, violin and synthesiser.)

== See also ==
- Category:Compositions by Luigi Boccherini
- Romantic guitar
- Louis Picquot
